= 1972 New Zealand Grand Prix =

- Race 1 of 7 in 1972 Tasman Series
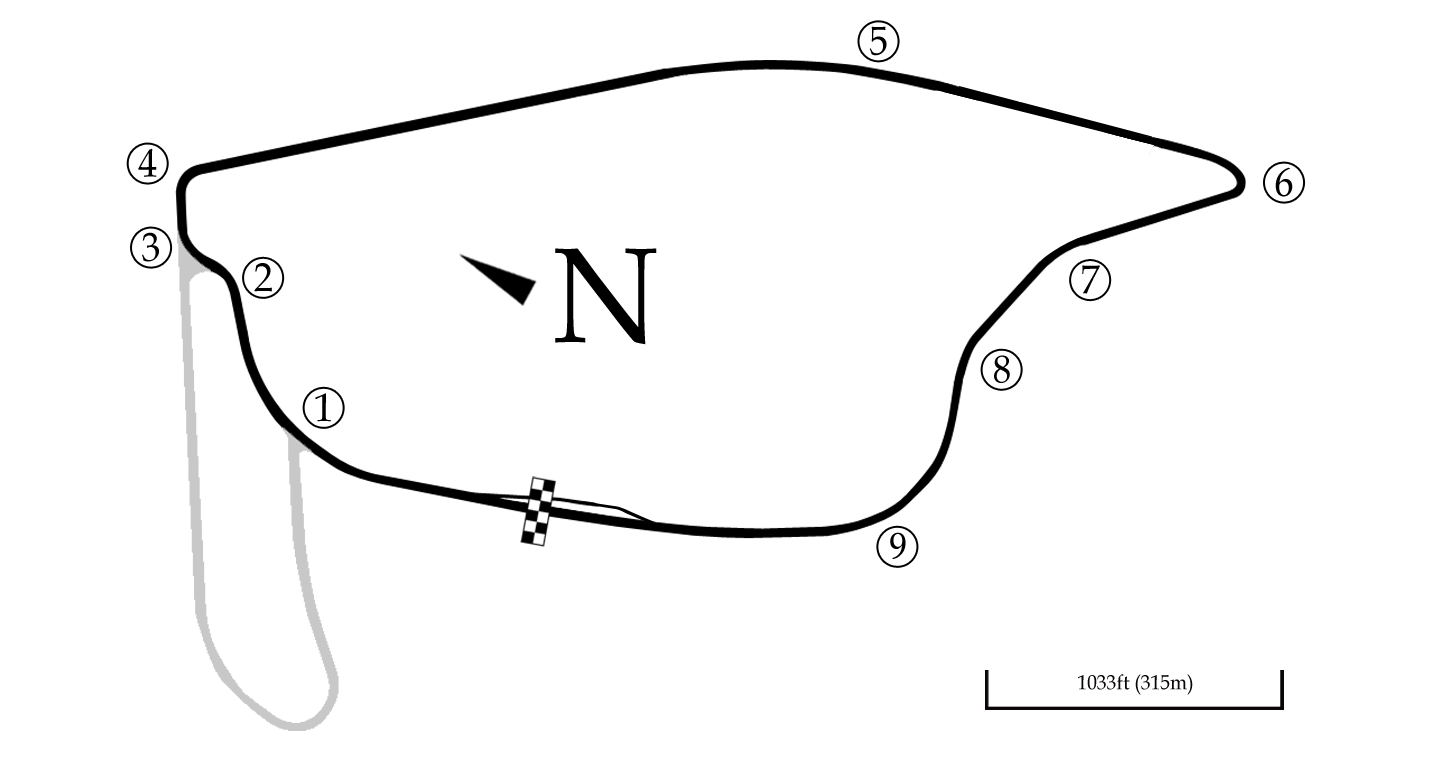

Race details
- Date: 8 January 1972
- Location: Pukekohe Park Raceway, Pukekohe, New Zealand
- Course: Permanent racing facility
- Course length: 2.82 km (1.76 miles)
- Distance: 58 laps, 164 km (102 miles)
- Weather: Light Cloud

Pole position
Driver	(New Zealand) Graham McRae	Leda-Chevrolet
- Time: 55.2

Fastest lap
Driver	(Australia) Frank Gardner	Lola-Chevrolet
- Time: 56.9

Podium
First	(Australia) Frank Gardner	Lola-Chevrolet
Second	(United Kingdom) Mike Hailwood	Surtees-Chevrolet
Third	(United Kingdom) David Hobbs	McLaren-Chevrolet

The 1972 New Zealand Grand Prix was a race held at the Pukekohe Park Raceway on 8 January 1972. The race had 20 starters.

It was the 18th New Zealand Grand Prix, and doubled as the first round of the 1972 Tasman Series. Australian Frank Gardner won his first NZGP in his McLaren Formula 5000 ahead of British Grand Prix motorcycle racing champion Mike Hailwood. The first New Zealand driver to finish was Robbie Francevic in the McLaren Formula 5000 who came in 9th place.

The race saw the death of Bryan Faloon who died after an accident on the back straight with Graeme Lawrence in the closing laps of the race.

== Classification ==
Pos	No.	Driver	Team	Car	Laps	Time
1	1	(Australia) Frank Gardner	Lola Cars Ltd.	Lola T300 / Chevrolet 4995cc V8	58	57min 16.5sec
2	2	(United Kingdom) Mike Hailwood	Team Surtees	Surtees TS8A / Chevrolet 4995cc V8	58	+ 27.0 s
3	10	(United Kingdom) David Hobbs	Hobbs Racing London	McLaren M18/M22 / Chevrolet 4995cc V8	58	+ 31.1 s
4	5	(Australia) Kevin Bartlett	Kevin Bartlett Shell Racing	McLaren M10B / Chevrolet 4995cc V8	58	+ 31.5 s
5	6	(Australia) Max Stewart	Max Stewart Motors	Elfin MR5 / Repco-Holden 4994cc V8	58	+ 37.6 s
6	34	(Belgium) Teddy Pilette	Racing Team V.D.S.	McLaren M10B / Chevrolet 4995cc V8	58	+ 1:04.3 s
7	29	(Australia) John McCormack	Elfin Sports Cars	Elfin MR5 / Repco-Holden 4994cc V8	57	+ 1 Lap
8	7	(United States) Evan Noyes	Gemco Racing	McLaren M18 / Chevrolet 4995cc V8	56	+ 2 Laps
9	60	(New Zealand) Robbie Francevic	Wright Machinery	McLaren M10A / Chevrolet 4995cc V8	55	+ 3 Laps
10	10	(New Zealand) Graham McRae	Crown Lynn	Leda GM1 / Chevrolet 4995cc V8	49	+ 9 Laps
11	11	(New Zealand) Ken Smith	Air New Zealand Motor Racing	Lotus 69B / Hart 1860cc 4cyl	49	+ 9 Laps
12	16	(New Zealand) Peter Hughes	Town & Country Cars Ltd.	Begg FM2 / Chevrolet 4945cc V8	48	+ 10 Laps
13	10	(Australia) Garrie Cooper	Crown Lynn	Elfin MR5 / Repco-Holden 4994cc V8	48	+ 10 Laps
Ret	18	(New Zealand) David Oxton	G.N. Begg Engineering Co. Ltd.	Begg FM4 / Chevrolet 4945cc V8	53	Hit Debris
Ret	14	(New Zealand) Graeme Lawrence	Lawrence Racing	Lola T300 / Chevrolet 4995cc V8	52	Accident
Ret	57	(New Zealand) Bryan Faloon	Stanton Motors Ltd.	Stanton 1 / Porsche 1981cc 8cyl	51	Fatal Accident
Ret	30	(Canada) David McConnell	D.W.M. Racing Ltd.	Begg FM4 / Chevrolet 4945cc V8	48	Retired
Ret	88	(New Zealand) Frank Radisich	Henderson Central Motors Ltd.	Begg FM4 / Chevrolet 4945cc V8	40	Engine
Ret	3	(Australia) Frank Matich	Frank Matich Racing Pty. Ltd.	McLaren M10B / Repco-Holden 4994cc V8	19	Engine
Ret	12	(New Zealand) Baron Robertson	Robertson Racing	Matich A50 / Repco-Holden 4994cc V8	2	Engine
DNA	32	(Canada) Allan Moffat	Allan Moffat Motor Racing Co.	unknown		Did Not Arrive

Preceded by none	Tasman Series; 1972	Succeeded by 1972 Levin International
Preceded by 1971 New Zealand Grand Prix	New Zealand Grand Prix; 1972	Succeeded by 1973 New Zealand Grand Prix
