= 1971 New Zealand Grand Prix =

- Race 2 of 7 in 1971 Tasman Series
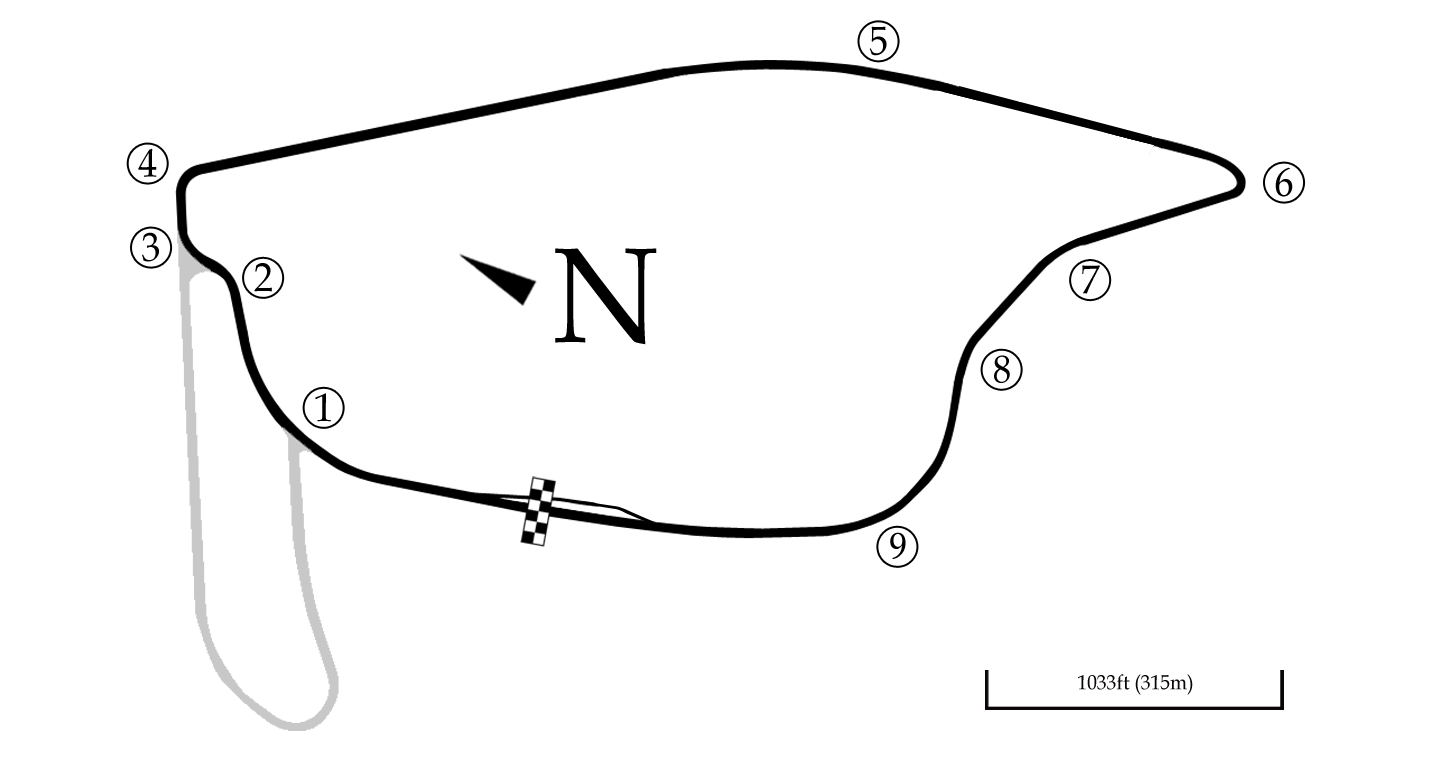

Race details
- Date: 10 January 1971
- Location: Pukekohe Park Raceway, Pukekohe, New Zealand
- Course: Permanent racing facility
- Course length: 2.82 km (1.76 miles)
- Distance: 58 laps, 164 km (102 miles)
- Weather: Sunny

Pole position
Driver	(Australia) Neil Allen	McLaren-Chevrolet
- Time: 56.9

Fastest lap
Driver	(Australia) Frank Matich	McLaren-Chevrolet
- Time: 56.7

Podium
First	(Australia) Neil Allen	McLaren-Chevrolet
Second	(Australia) Frank Matich	McLaren-Chevrolet
Third	(New Zealand) Graham McRae	McLaren-Chevrolet

The 1971 New Zealand Grand Prix was a race held at the Pukekohe Park Raceway on 9 January 1971. The race had 20 starters.

It was the 17th New Zealand Grand Prix, and doubled as the second round of the 1971 Tasman Series. Australian Neil Allen won his first NZGP in his McLaren Formula 5000 ahead of fellow Australian and previous years winner, Frank Matich. The first New Zealand driver to finish was Graham McRae in the McLaren Formula 5000.

== Classification ==
Pos	No.	Driver	Team	Car	Laps	Time
1	26	(Australia) Neil Allen	N.E. Allen Auto Indust. (Pty) Ltd	McLaren M10B / Chevrolet 4988cc V8	58	56m 27.0s
2	10	(Australia) Frank Matich	Rothmans Team Matich	McLaren M10B / Chevrolet 4940cc V8	58	+ 0.4 s
3	22	(New Zealand) Graham McRae	Crown Lynn	McLaren M10B / Chevrolet 4988cc V8	58	+ 7.7 s
4	3	(United States) Mike Eyerly	Bonphil Racing	Surtees TS8 / Chevrolet 4988cc V8	58	+ 32.7 s
5	1	(Canada) John Cannon	Hogan Racing Ltd	McLaren M10B / Chevrolet 4988cc V8	58	+ 32.7 s
6	14	(New Zealand) Graeme Lawrence	Air New Zealand	Dino 246 Tasmania / Ferrari 2417cc V6	57	+ 1 Lap
7	32	(United Kingdom) Malcolm Guthrie	Guthrie Racing	Lola T192 / Chevrolet 4988cc V8	56	+ 2 Laps
8	9	(New Zealand) Frank Radisich		McLaren M10A / Chevrolet 4988cc V8	56	+ 2 Laps
9	25	(New Zealand) Chris Amon	STP Corporation	Lotus 70 / Ford 4988cc V8	55	+ 3 Laps
10	11	(New Zealand) Ken Smith	Team Cambridge	Lotus Cars 69 / Cosworth 1850cc 4cyl	53	+ 5 Laps
11	12	(New Zealand) Baron Robertson	Robertson Racing	Brabham BT23C / Cosworth 1598cc 4cyl		
12	80	(Canada) Dave McConnell	D.McConnell	Lotus 69 / Ford 1598cc V8		
Ret	2	(New Zealand) David Oxton	STP Corporation	March 701 / Cosworth 2491cc V8	51	Half-Shaft
Ret	72	(United States) Evan Noyes	Fred Opert Racing	Brabham BT29 / Chevrolet 1850cc 4cyl	47	Puncture
Ret	28	(United States) Bob Brown	Colorado Ski Country	Lola T190 / Chevrolet 4988cc V8	44	Oil Pump
Ret	31	(Australia) Frank Gardner	Guthrie Racing	Lola T192 / Chevrolet 4988cc V8	12	Accident
Ret	5	(Australia) Kevin Bartlett	Alec Mildren Racing Pty. Ltd	Mildren / Chevrolet 4988cc V8	11	Retired
Ret	8	(Australia) Don O'Sullivan	Rothmans Team Matich	McLaren M10A / Repco 4988cc V8	8	Half-Shaft
Ret	34	(Belgium) Teddy Pilette	Racing Team V.D.S.	McLaren M10B / Chevrolet 4988cc V8	3	Oil Pressure
DNS	52	(New Zealand) Bryan Faloon	Wills Export Racing Team	Rorstan Mk1a / Porsche 1990 8cyl		
DNS	57	(New Zealand) Dexter Dunlop	Team Cambridge	McRae S2 / Cosworth 1598cc 4cyl		

Preceded by 1971 Levin International	Tasman Series; 1971	Succeeded by 1971 Lady Wigram Trophy
Preceded by 1970 New Zealand Grand Prix	New Zealand Grand Prix; 1971	Succeeded by 1972 New Zealand Grand Prix
