= 1974 New Zealand Grand Prix =

- Race 3 of 8 in 1974 Tasman Series
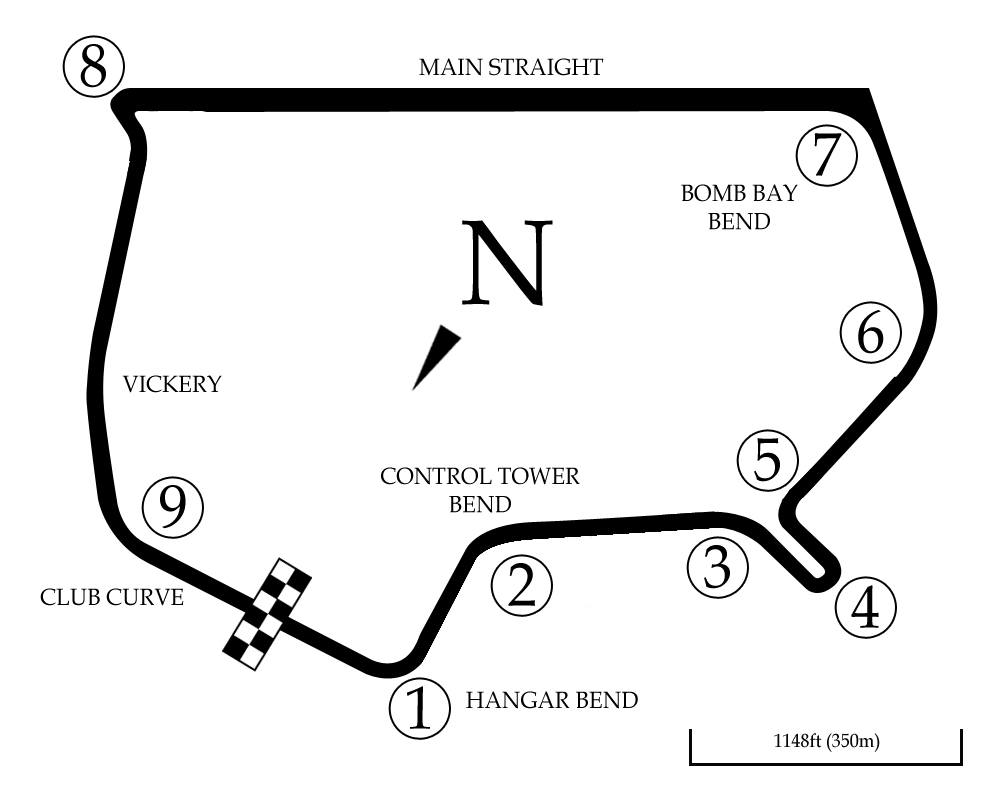

Race details
- Date: 19 January 1974
- Location: Wigram Airfield Circuit, Christchurch, New Zealand
- Course: Temporary racing facility
- Course length: 3.54 km (2.20 miles)
- Distance: 47 laps, 166 km (103 miles)
- Weather: Light Cloud

Fastest lap
Driver	(United Kingdom) Peter Gethin	Chevron-Chevrolet
- Time: 1:03.6

Podium
First	(Australia) John McCormack	Elfin-Repco
Second	(Belgium) Teddy Pilette	Chevron-Chevrolet
Third	(United Kingdom) Peter Gethin	Chevron-Chevrolet

The 1974 New Zealand Grand Prix was a race held at the Wigram Airfield Circuit on 19 January 1974. The race had 20 starters. This was the first and only New Zealand Grand Prix to be held at the Wigram Airfield Circuit, and the race was also the 1974 Lady Wigram Trophy. The race was moved to Wigram from the usual Pukekohe to be part of the Commonwealth Games being held in Christchurch.

It was the 20th New Zealand Grand Prix, 23rd Lady Wigram Trophy and doubled as the third round of the 1974 Tasman Series, Australian John McCormack won his second NZGP in succession in his Elfin MR5 who finished ahead of Belgian Teddy Pilette and Briton Peter Gethin. The first New Zealand driver to finish was David Oxton in the Begg FM5 who came in 4th place.

== Classification ==
Pos	No.	Driver	Car	Laps	Time
1	4	(Australia) John McCormack	Elfin MR5 / Repco 4994cc V8	47	52min 29.8sec
2	3	(Belgium) Teddy Pilette	Chevron B24 / Chevrolet 4995cc V8	47	+ 41.4 s
3	2	(United Kingdom) Peter Gethin	Chevron B24 / Chevrolet 4995cc V8	47	+ 56.9 s
4	18	(New Zealand) David Oxton	Begg FM5 / Chevrolet 4995cc V8	47	+ 1:04.2 s
5	22	(New Zealand) Garry Pedersen	McLaren M18 / Chevrolet 4995cc V8	46	+ 1 Lap
6	14	(New Zealand) Graeme Lawrence	Lola T332 / Chevrolet 4995cc V8	45	+ 2 Laps
7	21	(New Zealand) Allan McCully	Begg FM5 / Chevrolet 4995cc V8	45	+ 2 Laps
8	15	(New Zealand) Reg Cook	Lola T300 / Chevrolet 4995cc V8	42	+ 5 Laps
9	12	(New Zealand) Baron Robertson	Elfin MR5 / Repco 4994cc V8	40	+ 7 Laps
10	11	(New Zealand) Ken Smith	March 732 / Cosworth 1930cc 4cyl	34	+ 13 Laps
Ret	16	(New Zealand) Dexter Dunlop	McRae GM1 / Chevrolet 4995cc V8	38	Fuel Injection
Ret	1	(New Zealand) Graham McRae	McRae GM2 / Chevrolet 4995cc V8	30	Valve Spring
Ret	10	(Australia) Warwick Brown	Lola T332 / Chevrolet 4995cc V8	27	Gearbox
Ret	19	(New Zealand) Robbie Booth	Begg FM4 / Chevrolet 4995cc V8	24	Differential
Ret	7	(Australia) Johnnie Walker	Lola T330 / Repco 4994cc V8	20	Gearbox
Ret	6	(Australia) Max Stewart	Lola T330 / Chevrolet 4995cc V8	12	Oil Line
Ret	20	(New Zealand) Neil Doyle	Surtees TS9B / Chevrolet 4995cc V8	7	Suspension
Ret	24	(New Zealand) John Laney	McLaren M10B / Chevrolet 4995cc V8	7	Engine

Preceded by 1974 Pukekohe Grand Prix	Tasman Series; 1974	Succeeded by 1974 Teretonga International
Preceded by 1973 New Zealand Grand Prix	New Zealand Grand Prix; 1974	Succeeded by 1975 New Zealand Grand Prix
