= 1973 New Zealand Grand Prix =

- Race 1 of 7 in 1973 Tasman Series
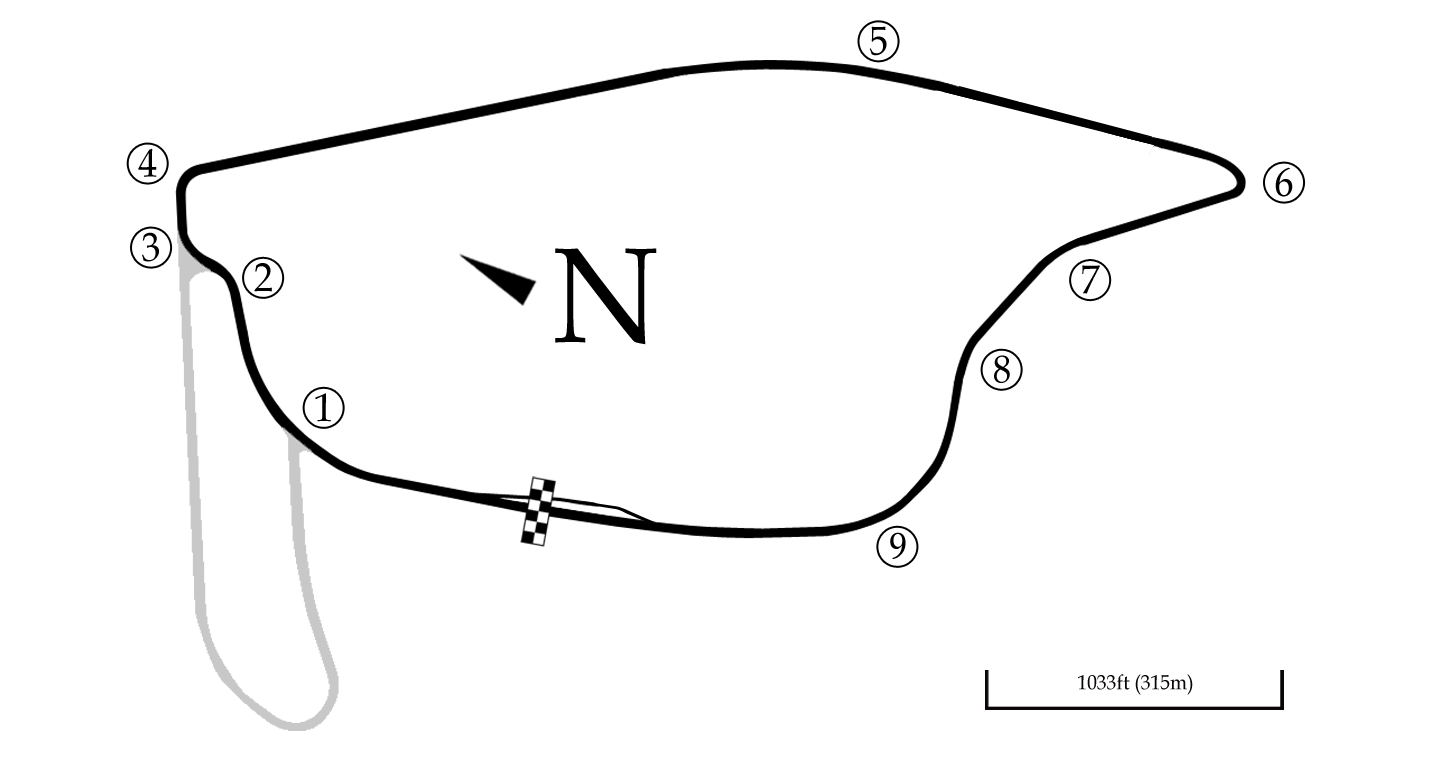

Race details
- Date: 6 January 1973
- Location: Pukekohe Park Raceway, Pukekohe, New Zealand
- Course: Permanent racing facility
- Course length: 2.82 km (1.76 miles)
- Distance: 58 laps, 164 km (102 miles)
- Weather: Light Cloud

Pole position
Driver	(Australia) Frank Matich	Matich-Repco

Fastest lap
Driver	(New Zealand) Graham McRae	McRae-Chevrolet
- Time: 1:07.7

Podium
First	(Australia) John McCormack	Elfin-Repco
Second	(United Kingdom) Alan Rollinson	McRae-Chevrolet
Third	(United Kingdom) Steve Thompson	Chevron-Chevrolet

The 1973 New Zealand Grand Prix was a race held at the Pukekohe Park Raceway on 6 January 1973. The race had 20 starters.

It was the 19th New Zealand Grand Prix, and doubled as the first round of the 1973 Tasman Series. Australian John McCormack won his first NZGP in his Elfin MR5 who finished ahead of Britons Allan Rollinson and Steve Thompson. The first New Zealand driver to finish was Graham McRae in the McRae GM1 who came in 4th place.

After the fatal accident of Bryan Faloon the previous year, two chicanes were added to circuit in a bid to slow the cars down. One was placed down the back straight and the other was just before the main straight. These chicanes were very artificial, with them being made up of concrete kerbing, railway sleepers and tractor tyres.

== Classification ==
Pos	No.	Driver	Team	Car	Laps	Time
1	29	(Australia) John McCormack	Ansett Team Elfin	Elfin MR5 / Repco 4994cc V8	58	57min 16.5sec
2	21	(United Kingdom) Alan Rollinson	McKechnie Racing Organisation	McRae GM1 / Chevrolet 4995cc V8	58	+ 0.6 s
3	3	(United Kingdom) Steve Thompson	Servis / Alan Brodie	Chevron B24 / Chevrolet 4995cc V8	57	+ 1 Lap
4	22	(New Zealand) Graham McRae	Crown Lynn	McRae GM1 / Chevrolet 4995cc V8	56	+ 2 Laps
5	89	(New Zealand) Garry Pedersen	Wright Machinery	Begg FM4 / Chevrolet 4995cc V8	56	+ 2 Laps
6	11	(New Zealand) Ken Smith	Air New Zealand Motor Racing	March 722 / Cosworth 1930cc V8	52	+ 6 Laps
7	15	(Japan) Noritake Takahara	Takahara Racing Inc.	Brabham BT36 / Cosworth 1790cc V8	52	+ 6 Laps
8	30	(Canada) Dave McConnell	D.W.M. Racing Ltd.	Surtees TS15 / Hart 1975cc 4cyl	52	+ 6 Laps
NC	1	(Australia) Frank Matich	Frank Matich Racing Pty Ltd.	Matich A50 / Repco 4994cc V8	43	Not Classified
Ret	10	(Australia) Warwick Brown	Team Target	Lola T300 / Chevrolet 4995cc V8	54	Out of Fuel
Ret	34	(United States) Sam Posey	Champ Carr Inc.	Surtees TS11 / Chevrolet 4995cc V8	44	Throttle
Ret	12	(New Zealand) Baron Robertson	Robertson Racing	March 722 / Cosworth 1790cc V8	40	Engine
Ret	52	(New Zealand) Dexter Dunlop	Cameron Racing	McRae GM1 / Chevrolet 4995cc V8	40	Flagged Off
Ret	5	(Australia) Kevin Bartlett	Chesterfield Filter Racing	Lola T300 / Chevrolet 4995cc V8	17	Overheating
Ret	7	(United States) Evan Noyes	Gemco Racing	McRae GM1 / Chevrolet 4995cc V8	15	Fuel Injection
Ret	36	(New Zealand) Kelvin Cameron	Cameron Motor Court	Brabham BT23C / Cosworth 1791cc 4cyl	11	Flywheel
Ret	19	(New Zealand) David Oxton	G.N. Begg Engineering Co. Ltd.	Begg FM5 / Chevrolet 4995cc V8	5	Accident
Ret	6	(Australia) Max Stewart	Max Stewart Motors	Lola T330 / Chevrolet 4995cc V8	3	Suspension
DNS		(New Zealand) Frank Radisich		McLaren M10B / Repco 4994cc V8		Did Not Start

Preceded by none	Tasman Series; 1973	Succeeded by 1973 Levin International
Preceded by 1972 New Zealand Grand Prix	New Zealand Grand Prix; 1973	Succeeded by 1974 New Zealand Grand Prix
