= 1970 New Zealand Grand Prix =

- Race 2 of 7 in 1970 Tasman Series
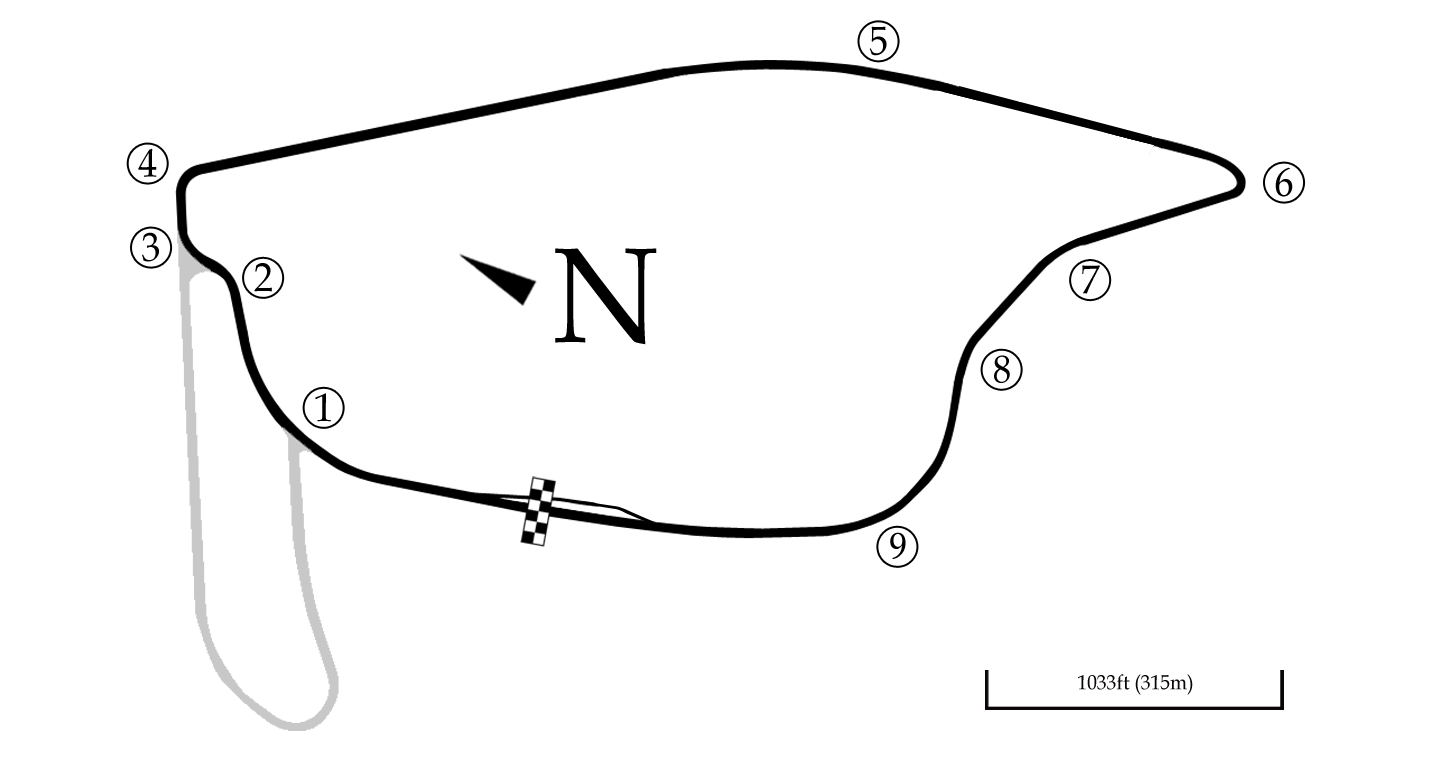

Race details
- Date: 10 January 1970
- Location: Pukekohe Park Raceway, Pukekohe, New Zealand
- Course: Permanent racing facility
- Course length: 2.82 km (1.76 miles)
- Distance: 58 laps, 164 km (102 miles)
- Weather: Sunny

Pole position
Driver	(Australia) Frank Matich	McLaren-Chevrolet
- Time: 59.25

Fastest lap
Driver	(Australia) Frank Matich	McLaren-Chevrolet
- Time: 59.2

Podium
First	(Australia) Frank Matich	McLaren-Chevrolet
Second	(United Kingdom) Derek Bell	Brabham-Cosworth
Third	(New Zealand) Graeme Lawrence	Ferrari

The 1970 New Zealand Grand Prix was a race held at the Pukekohe Park Raceway on 10 January 1970. The race had 20 starters.

It was the 16th New Zealand Grand Prix, and doubled as the second round of the 1970 Tasman Series. Frank Matich won his first NZGP in his McLaren Formula 5000 ahead of British racer Derek Bell driving a Tasman Formula specification Brabham-Cosworth. The first New Zealand driver to finish was Graeme Lawrence in Ferrari Dino 246T/69.

== Classification ==
Results as follows:

Pos	No.	Driver	Team	Car	Laps	Time
1	7	(Australia) Frank Matich	Rothmans Team Matich	McLaren M10A / Chevrolet 5.0L V8	58	58m 38.9s
2	77	(United Kingdom) Derek Bell	Wheatcroft Racing	Brabham BT26 / Cosworth DFW V8 2.5	58	59m 01.8s
3	14	(New Zealand) Graeme Lawrence	Lawrence Racing	Ferrari Dino 246T/69 / Ferrari V6 2.4	57	57m 55.4s
4	1	(United States) Ron Grable	I.M. Rorison Motor Racing Div	McLaren M10A / Chevrolet 5.0L V8	57	
5	6	(Australia) Kevin Bartlett	Alec Mildren Pty. Ltd.	Mildren Mono / Waggott TC4V 2.0 4cyl	57	
6	17	(Sweden) Ulf Norinder	Ulf Norinder Racing	Lola T190 / Chevrolet 5.0L V8	56	
7	96	(United States) Mike Goth	Mike Goth Racing	Surtees TS5 / Chevrolet 5.0L V8	56	
8	26	(Australia) Niel Allen	N.E. Allen (Auto Indust.)	McLaren M10B / Chevrolet 5.0L V8	56	
9	5	(Australia) Max Stewart	Alec Mildren Pty. Ltd.	Mildren Rennmax / Waggott TC4V 2.0 4cyl	55	
10	33	(United Kingdom) Derrick Williams	W.C. Wilkins	Lola T142 / Chevrolet 5.0L V8	54	
11	24	(United States) Pierre Phillips	G.N. Begg	Begg FM2 / Chevrolet 5.0L V8	54	
12	9	(New Zealand) Frank Radisich	Henderson Central Motors	McLaren M4A / Cosworth FVA 1.6L 4cyl	54	
13	11	(New Zealand) Ken Smith	K.J. Smith	Lotus 41 / Ford 1.6	53	
14	61	(New Zealand) Brian Pellow	Pellow Bros.	Brabham BT6 / Ford 1.6	52	
Ret	23	(United States) Bill Simpson	W. Simpson	Eagle Mk.5 / Chevrolet 5.0L V8	39	
Ret	2	(New Zealand) Graham McRae	Crown Lynn	McLaren M10A / Chevrolet 5.0L V8	20	
Ret	3	(United States) Mike Campbell	Forsgreen Engineering	Forsgrini Mk.14 / Chevrolet 5.0L V8	12	
Ret	20	(United Kingdom) Kaye Griffiths	Sir Charles Napier Racing	BRP 2 / Ford 4.7L V8	11	
Ret	10	(New Zealand) Dennis Marwood	Rorstan Motor Racing	Eisert JE67 / Chevrolet 5.0L V8	3	
Ret	57	(New Zealand) Bryan Faloon	Cambridge Racing Team	Rorstan Mk.1 / Climax FPF 2.5		
Ret	12	(New Zealand) Jim Boyd	Cambridge Racing Team	Brabham BT11a / Climax FPF 2.5		
Ret	15	(New Zealand) Wayne Murdoch	W. Murdoch	Brabham BT10 / Ford 1.6		

Preceded by 1970 Levin International	Tasman Series; 1970	Succeeded by 1970 Lady Wigram Trophy
Preceded by 1969 New Zealand Grand Prix	New Zealand Grand Prix; 1970	Succeeded by 1971 New Zealand Grand Prix
