= Formula 5000 =

Former Single-Seater Racing class

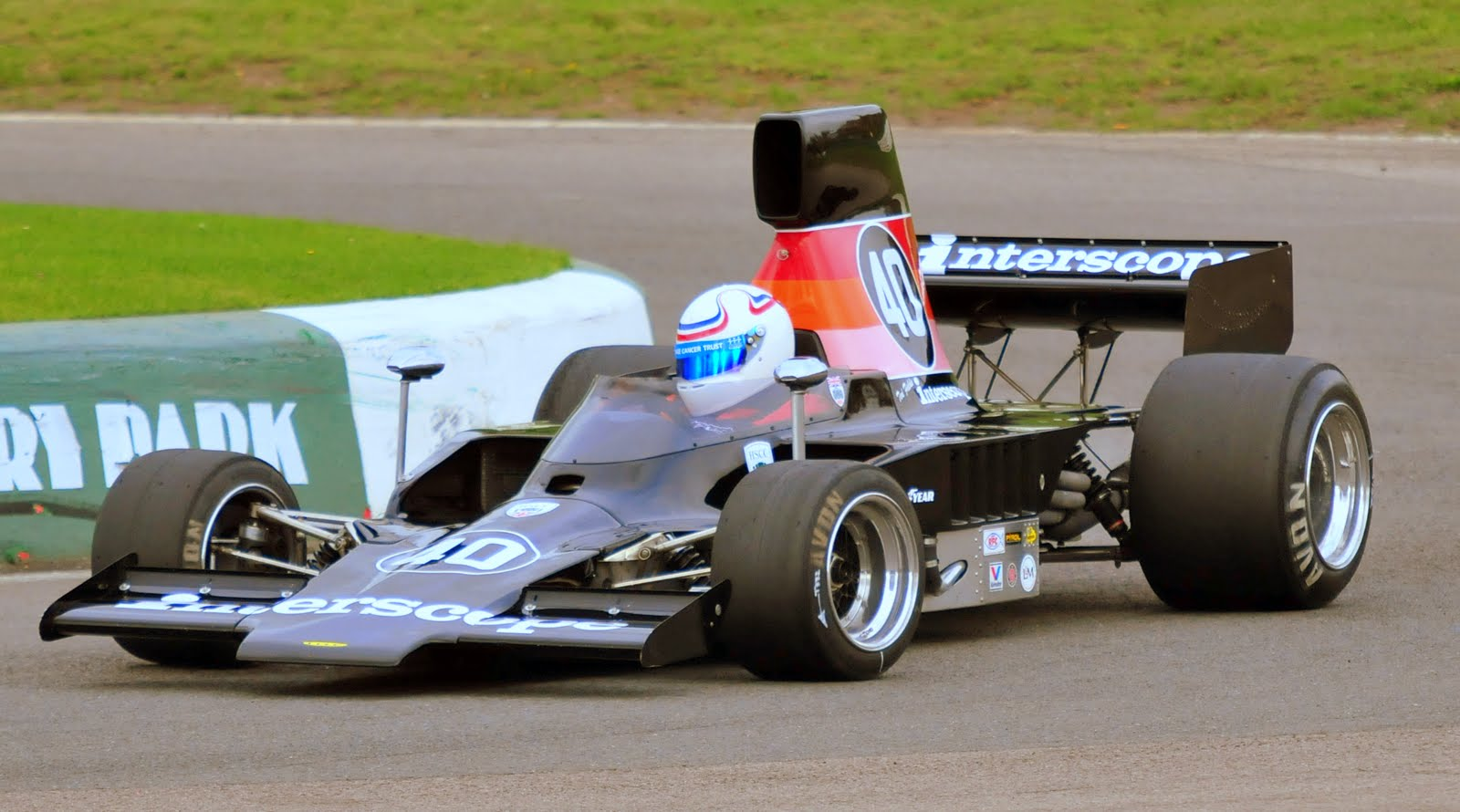
1974 Lola T332

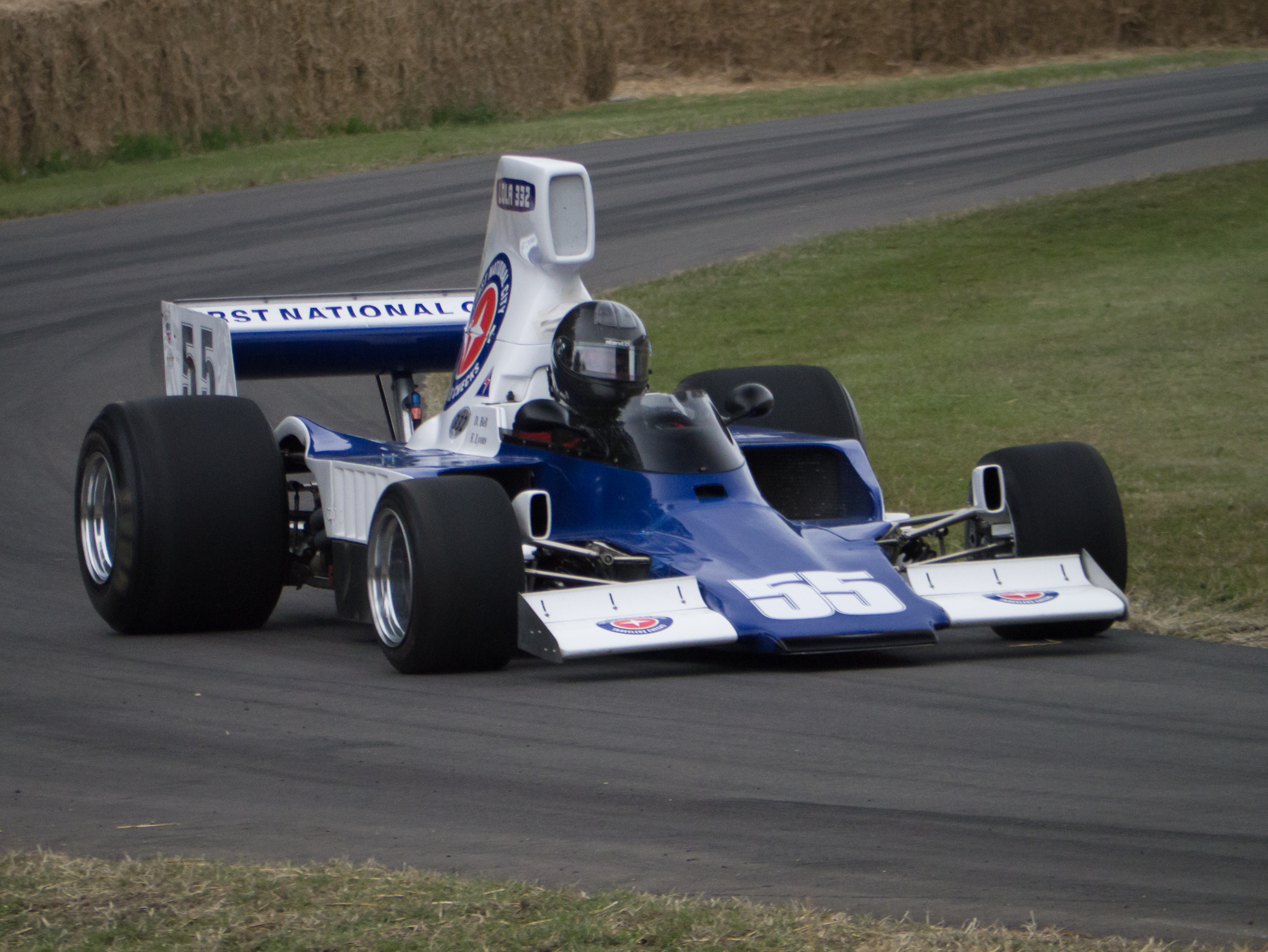
A 1974 Lola T330 Formula 5000 car

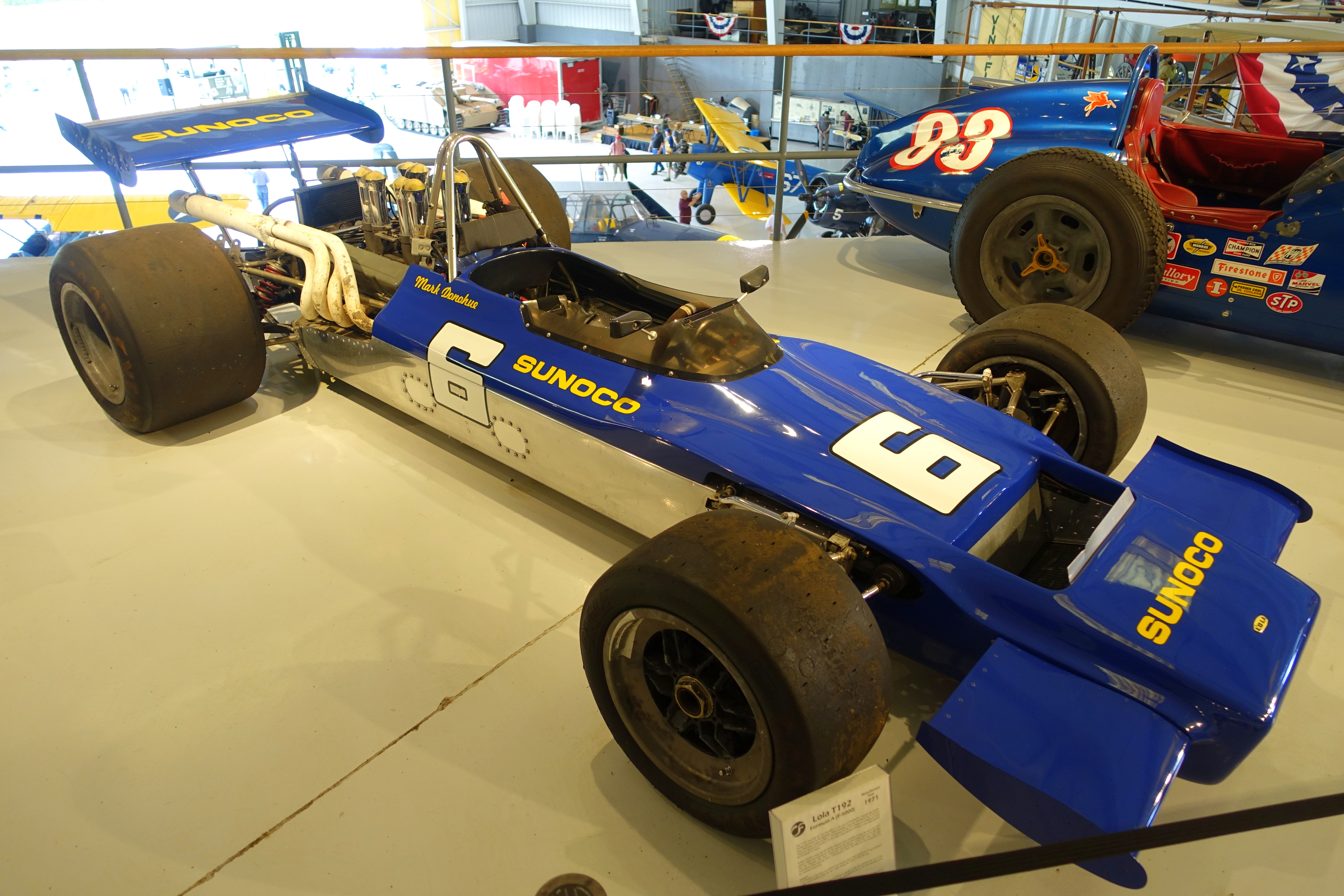
A 1971 Lola T192 Formula 5000 car

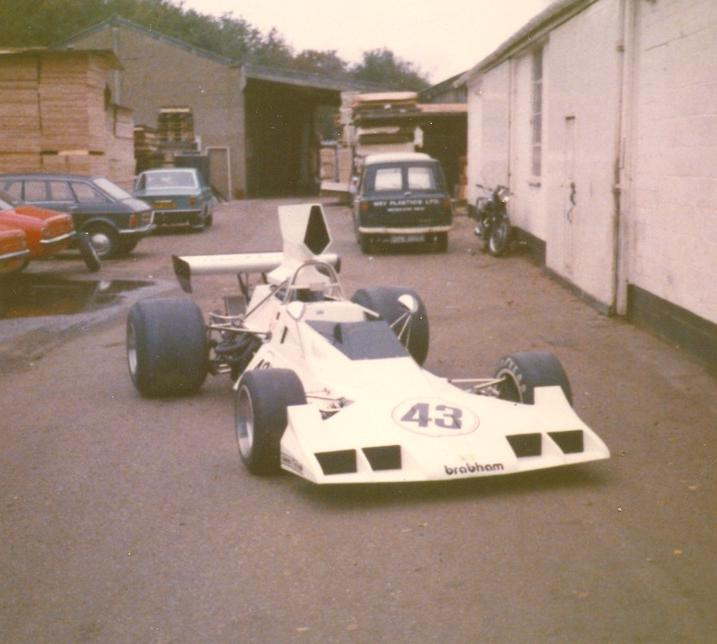
The 1973 Brabham BT43 F5000 car. This was the only Brabham designed for F5000 racing.

Formula 5000 (or F5000) was an open wheel, single seater auto-racing formula that ran in different series in various regions around the world from 1968 to 1982. It was originally intended as a low-cost series aimed at open-wheel racing cars that no longer fit into any particular formula. The '5000' denomination comes from the maximum 5.0 litre engine capacity allowed in the cars, although many cars ran with smaller engines. Manufacturers included McLaren, Eagle, March, Lola, Lotus, Elfin, Matich and Chevron.

In its declining years in North America Formula 5000 was re-booted as the Can-Am series with cars being modified into closed wheel, but still single-seat sports car category.

== F5000 around the world ==
=== North America ===
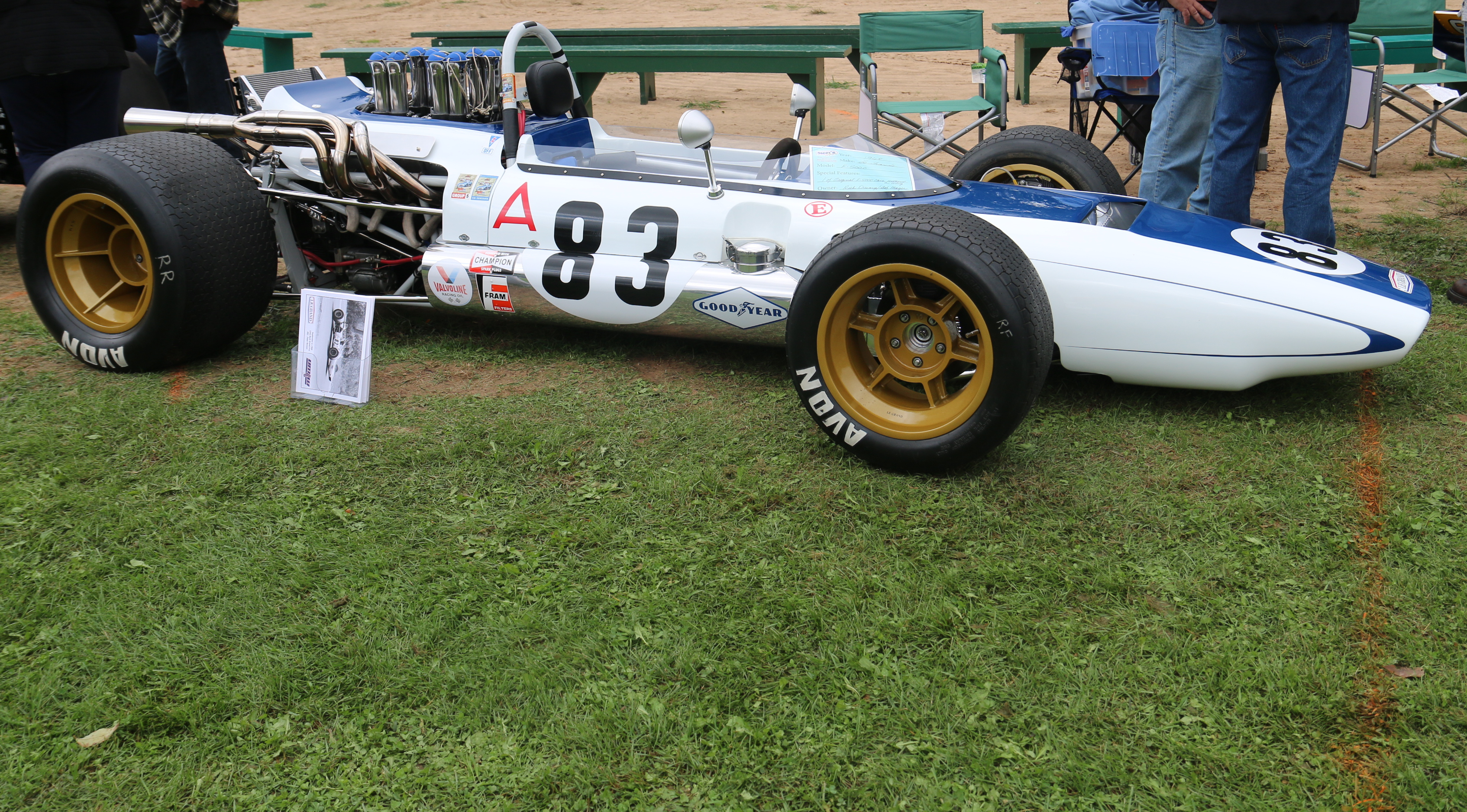
1968 LeGrand Formula 5000 race car

Formula 5000 was introduced in 1968 as a class within SCCA Formula A races, a series where single seaters from different origins were allowed to compete, but which rapidly came to be dominated by the cars equipped with production-based American V8s. The engines used were generally 5 litre, fuel injected Chevrolet engines with about 500 horsepower (370 kW) at 8000 rpm, although other makes were also used. The concept was inspired by the success of the Can-Am Series, which featured unlimited formula sports cars fitted with very powerful engines derived from American V8s; the idea was to replicate the concept using open wheel racing cars. F5000 enjoyed popularity in the early 1970s in the U.S. and featured drivers such as Mario Andretti, Al Unser, Bobby Unser, James Hunt, Jody Scheckter, Brian Redman, David Hobbs, Tony Adamowicz, Sam Posey, Ian Ashley, John Cannon and Eppie Wietzes.

Increasing costs and Lola domination meant the formula quickly lost its appeal after 1975. Older cars continued to be used in the SCCA national races, but the most competitive teams reconverted their cars with sports car bodyworks, in the resurrected Can-Am championship, starting in 1977. The formula worked initially, with a number of European drivers crossing the Atlantic to attend the SCCA-run championship, but when IMSA introduced the new GTP prototype regulations for the IMSA GT Championship in 1981, the old F5000 were now clumsy and slow compared to the new cars.

=== Europe ===
In the UK, the arrival of the Cosworth DFV engine meant that many teams could afford to build their own chassis around a good engine/transmission package, so Cooper, Lotus and Brabham stopped the production of customer Formula 1 cars. Unfortunately, smaller privateer teams and drivers that entered Britain's non-championship F1 events were left behind, and the RAC quickly adopted the American F5000 regulations.

A European championship was first run in 1969 as the Guards Formula 5000 Championship. This was renamed to Guards European Formula 5000 Championship in 1970, to Rothmans European Formula 5000 Championship in 1971 and then to ShellSport European Formula 5000 Championship in 1975.

Unlike the American series, the European championship didn't attract many star names from Formula 1 and sports cars, and was dominated by drivers that were usually seen in Formula 2 or at the back of F1's World Championship grids. Peter Gethin managed to launch his F1 career thanks to his F5000 championship titles. While it was based in the United Kingdom, the series managed to spread across Europe, with races held at many international circuits, including Monza (Italy), Hockenheim (Germany) and Zandvoort (Netherlands), and attracted a significant number of continental drivers.

The weak pound (a result of the energy crisis) and the increasing cost of importing Chevrolet V8 engines caused some concern and engine regulations for European F5000 were revised to permit engines other than the 5.0 litre pushrod V8s - the DOHC Cosworth GA V6 (based on a unit used in Group 2 Capris was permitted to race at a capacity of 3500cc. March 75A and Chevron B30 cars were successful with the V6, the March in particular being little more than a 751 Formula One car with minor modifications for the new engine.

However, the same problem that befell US F5000 happened in Europe, and in 1976 the European F5000 Championship evolved into the Shellsport Group 8 Championship. This was a British-based series for Formula 1, Formula 2, Formula 5000 and Formula Atlantic cars, forming the basis of what would become the Aurora F1 Championship in 1978. The F1 Championship was open to Formula 1 and Formula 2 cars only, with Formula 5000 cars no longer eligible.

Older F5000 cars continued to be used in the British Sprint Championship and were common in Formula Libre races well into the 1980s.

=== Australia and New Zealand ===
In Australia and New Zealand, the Tasman Formula, defining cars eligible for the annual Tasman Series, was extended in 1970 to include Formula 5000 cars as well as the existing 2.5 litre cars. The Tasman Series ran during the Formula One off season in the European winter, and in the 1960s it had attracted the attention of the greatest names in Grand Prix racing, from locals Jack Brabham, Denny Hulme, Bruce McLaren and Chris Amon, to foreigners like Graham Hill, Jim Clark, Jackie Stewart, Phil Hill, Piers Courage and Jochen Rindt.

However, by the 1970s Formula One had become more commercial and the Grand Prix stars no longer took part. The Tasman Series had become a competitive Australian/New Zealand local championship leaving the field to be dominated by the cream of "Down Under" drivers such as Frank Matich, Frank Gardner, Kevin Bartlett, Vern Schuppan, Graeme McRae, Graeme Lawrence, Warwick Brown, Johnnie Walker, John McCormack, Alan Jones, John Goss, Larry Perkins, John Bowe and Garrie Cooper racing against European and American drivers such as David Hobbs, Teddy Pilette, Mike Hailwood, Sam Posey, Richard Attwood and Peter Gethin. The four Australian Formula 5000 Tasman races continued (separate from the New Zealand races) as the Rothmans International Series from 1976 until 1979.

Formula 5000 was also the main component of Australian Formula 1 from 1971 to 1981 and this formula was the primary category contesting the Australian Drivers' Championship during those years and the Australian Grand Prix until 1980. Although still called Australian Formula 1 until 1983, F5000 was replaced by Formula Pacific and Formula Mondial after 1981.

While European cars such as the various Lolas, McLarens and Chevrons were popular, locally made cars from Matich (Matich A50, A51, A52 and A53), Elfin (Elfin MR5, MR6, MR8 and the MR9, the only F5000 ever designed and built from the ground up with ground effects) and McRae were also successful. The most popular engine used was the 5.0 L (4,958 cc) Chevrolet V8, with the Australian made Repco Holden (4.9 L (4,940 cc)), based on the 5.0 L (5,044 cc) Holden V8 engine also popular and successful. Repco also modified the 4.4 L (4,414 cc) Leyland P76 V8 engine into a 4.9 L (4,931 cc) V8 developing around 470 bhp (350 kW; 477 PS) at its peak in 1977.

Formula 5000 remains a popular historic category in Australia and New Zealand with the Tasman Revival Series running races in both countries.

The S5000 Australian Drivers' Championship is marketed as a modern interpretation of Formula 5000, featuring a modern European-built open wheeler chassis fitted with a large-capacity V8 engine.

=== South Africa ===
The South African Formula One Championship was opened to Formula 5000 cars in 1968, with these racing against Formula One and Formula Two cars until the series switched to Formula Atlantic from 1976 onwards.

== Revival as historic racing category ==
The category was revived in the late 2000s in New Zealand as an amateur historic racing category. In 2009/2010, a five round race series was held, the final round as a support race for the 2010 Australian Grand Prix in Melbourne, Australia.

The annual Wine Country Classic, a historic automobile racing event held at Infineon Raceway in Sonoma, California, had a tribute to Formula 5000 in 2008. At that time, the Wine Country Classic was a sister event to the popular Monterey Historic Automobile Races held at Mazda Raceway Laguna Seca in Monterey, California.

In 2014, the Rolex Monterey Reunion featured Formula 5000 cars as a featured race to conclude the weekend and the 2015 get together included Formula 5000 cars as well.

== List of F5000 Champions ==
US Formula A/F5000 (1967–1976) Single-seat Can-Am (1977–1986)			European F5000 Championship			Tasman Series (F5000 years) Rothmans International Series (1976-1979)			Australian Drivers' Championship: CAMS Gold Star (F5000 years)			New Zealand Gold Star (F5000 years)			South African Gold Star (F5000 years)			Canadian Formula A		
Year	Driver	Car	Year	Driver	Car	Year	Driver	Car	Year	Driver	Car	Year	Driver	Car	Year	Driver	Car	Year	Driver	Car
1967	(United States) Gus Hutchison	Lotus 41 (Note: Gus Hutchison's Lotus was a Formula B car powered by a 1.6 litre BRM-Ford engine.)																		
1968	(United States) Lou Sell	Eagle Mk4													1968	(South Africa) Jackie Pretorius	Lola T140			
1969	(United States) Tony Adamowicz	Eagle Mk5	1969 (Note: The inaugural "European F5000 Championship" was contested in 1969 as Guards Formula 5000 Championship.)	(United Kingdom) Peter Gethin	McLaren M10A										1969	(South Africa) John McNicol	Lola T142	1969	(Canada) Eppie Wietzes	Lola T142
1970	(Canada) John Cannon	McLaren M10B	1970	(United Kingdom) Peter Gethin	McLaren M10B	1970	(New Zealand) Graeme Lawrence	Ferrari 246T (Note: Lawrence's car was powered by a 2.4 litre Ferrari engine.)				1969/70	(New Zealand) Graham McRae	Begg FM2; McLaren M10A	1970	(South Africa) Bob Olthoff	McLaren M10A	1970	(Canada) Eppie Wietzes	McLaren M10B
1971	(United Kingdom) David Hobbs	McLaren M10B	1971	(Australia) Frank Gardner	Lola T192; Lola T300	1971	(New Zealand) Graham McRae	McLaren M10B	1971	(Australia) Max Stewart	Mildren (Note: Stewart's car was powered by a 2.0 litre Waggott engine.)	1970/71	(New Zealand) Graeme Lawrence	Ferrari 246T; Brabham BT29 (Note: Lawrence's Ferrari powered by a 2.4 litre engine, and Brabham powered by a 1.8 litre Cosworth engine.)	1971	(South Africa) Paddy Driver	McLaren M10B			
1972	(New Zealand) Graham McRae	McRae GM1	1972	(Netherlands) Gijs van Lennep	Surtees TS11; McLaren M18	1972	(New Zealand) Graham McRae	Leda LT27	1972	(Australia) Frank Matich	Matich A50	1971/72	(New Zealand) David Oxton	Begg FM4	1972	(South Africa) Eddie Keizan	Surtees TS5			
1973	(South Africa) Jody Scheckter	Trojan T101; Lola T330	1973	(Belgium) Teddy Pilette	Chevron B24	1973	(New Zealand) Graham McRae	McRae GM1	1973	(Australia) John McCormack	Elfin MR5	1972/73	(New Zealand) David Oxton	Begg FM5	1973	(South Africa) Paddy Driver	McLaren M10B			
1974	(United Kingdom) Brian Redman	Lola T332	1974	(United Kingdom) Bob Evans	Lola T332	1974	(United Kingdom) Peter Gethin	Chevron B24	1974	(Australia) Max Stewart	Lola T330	1973/74	(New Zealand) David Oxton	Begg FM5						
1975	(United Kingdom) Brian Redman	Lola T332; Lola T400	1975	(Belgium) Teddy Pilette	Lola T400	1975	(Australia) Warwick Brown	Lola T332	1975	(Australia) John McCormack	Elfin MR6	1974/75	(New Zealand) Graeme Lawrence	Lola T332						
1976	(United Kingdom) Brian Redman	Lola T332C				1976	(Australia) Vern Schuppan	Lola T332	1976	(Australia) John Leffler	Lola T400	1975/76	(New Zealand) Ken Smith	Lola T332						
1977	(France) Patrick Tambay	Lola T333CS				1977	(Australia) Warwick Brown	Lola T430	1977	(Australia) John McCormack	McLaren M23	1976/77	(New Zealand) Dave McMillan	Ralt RT1 (Note: Formula 5000 cars were still permitted in the 1976/77 New Zealand Gold Star championship, but the points system favoured Formula Pacific drivers. Dave McMillan's Ralt was a Formula Pacific car powered by a 1.6 litre Ford engine.)						
1978	(Australia) Alan Jones	Lola T333CS				1978	(Australia) Warwick Brown	Lola T333CS	1978	(New Zealand) Graham McRae	McRae GM3									
1979	(Belgium) Jacky Ickx	Lola T333CS				1979	(Australia) Larry Perkins	Elfin MR8	1979	(Australia) Johnnie Walker	Lola T332									
1980	(France) Patrick Tambay	Lola T530							1980	(Australia) Alfredo Costanzo	Lola T430									
1981	(Australia) Geoff Brabham	Lola T530; VDS 001							1981	(Australia) Alfredo Costanzo	McLaren M26									
1982	(United States) Al Unser Jr.	Frissbee GR2; Frissbee GR3																		
1983	(Canada) Jacques Villeneuve	Frissbee GR2; Frissbee GR3																		
1984	(Republic of Ireland) Michael Roe	VDS 002; VDS 004																		
1985	(United States) Rick Miaskiewicz	Frissbee GR3																		
1986	(Canada) Horst Kroll	Frissbee KR3																		

== Notes ==
1971 SCCA Formula A Champion was Dave Heinz of Tampa, Florida in a Lola 142/Traco Chevy. The SCCA Runoffs were run at Road Atlanta that year.
