= Frank Matich =

Australian racing driver (1935–2015)

- Nationality: (Australia) Australian
- Born: Francis Anthony Matich; 25 January 1935
- Died: 11 May 2015 (aged 80)
- Retired: 1974

Tasman Series
- Years active: 1964-74
- Teams: Total Team; Rothmans Team Matich
- Wins: 5
- Best finish: 2nd in 1970 & 1971 Tasman Series

Previous series
- 1959, 63-5, 71-72 1961 1962 1964-68 1969-70: Australian Drivers' Champ. Australian GT Champ. Australian Formula Junior; Australian Tourist Trophy; Australian Sports Car Chp.

Championship titles
- 1961 1962 1964 1966 1967 1968 1969 1970 1970 1971 1972: Australian GT Champ. Australian Formula Junior Chp. Australian Tourist Trophy; Australian Tourist Trophy; Australian Tourist Trophy; Australian Tourist Trophy; Australian Sports Car Chp. New Zealand Grand Prix; Australian Grand Prix; Australian Grand Prix; Australian Drivers' Champ.

Francis Anthony Matich (25 January 1935 – 11 May 2015) was an Australian racing car driver. A highly successful motor racing competitor in the 1960s and 1970s, Matich built his own range of Matich sports cars and open wheel cars, mainly to support his own career, but some cars found success with other drivers. In these and other makes he won five Tasman Series races, two Australian Grands Prix, the 1972 Australian Drivers' Championship and a number of other Australian motor racing titles.

In April 1970, Matich was appointed as a Director of Lambretta (Australasia) Pty Ltd, and was to assemble McLaren racing cars in the Lambretta site in Artarmon, Sydney.

Matich, who suffered major electrical burns in a boating accident in 1973, retired from racing in 1974 in order to spend more time with his family and his business. His son Kris Matich became a leading Formula Ford driver in Sydney during the late 1980s.

== Career results ==
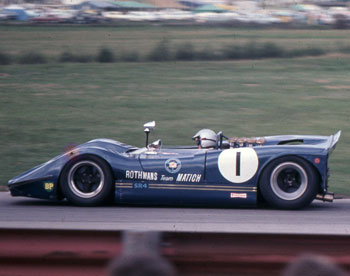
Matich won all three rounds of the 1969 Australian Sports Car Championship in the Matich SR4 Repco

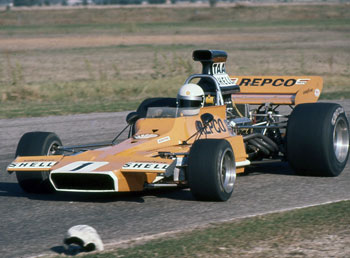
Matich in his A50 on the way to winning the Australian Drivers' Championship at Surfers Paradise in August 1972.

A summary of some of his motor racing achievements is given in the table below:

Season	Title / Series	Position	Car	Entrant
1958	Australian Tourist Trophy	4th	Jaguar C-Type	Leaton Motors Pty Ltd
1959	Australian Drivers' Championship	15th	Jaguar D-Type	Leaton Motors
1960	Australian Tourist Trophy	3rd	Jaguar D-Type	
1961	Australian Tourist Trophy	2nd	Jaguar D-Type	
1961	Australian GT Championship	1st	Jaguar D-Type	Team Leaton
1962	Australian Formula Junior Championship	1st	Elfin FJ-Ford Cosworth	F Matich
1963	Australian Drivers' Championship	7th	Elfin Catalina Ford	Team Total
1964	Tasman Series	10th	Brabham BT7A Climax FPF	Team Total
1964	Australian Drivers' Championship	4th	Brabham BT7A Climax FPF	Team Total
1964	Australian Tourist Trophy	1st	Lotus 19B Climax FPF	Total Team
1965	Tasman Series	10th	Brabham BT7A Climax FPF	Team Total
1965	Australian Drivers' Championship	6th	Brabham BT7A Climax FPF	Team Total
1966	Australian Tourist Trophy	1st	Elfin 400 Traco-Oldsmobile	Laurie O'Neil
1967	Australian Tourist Trophy	1st	Matich SR3 Traco-Oldsmobile	
1968	Australian Tourist Trophy	1st	Matich SR3 Repco RB620	Frank Matich Pty Ltd
1969	Australian Sports Car Championship	1st	Matich SR4 Repco RB760	Rothmans Team Matich
1970	Tasman Series	2nd	McLaren M10A Chevrolet	Rothmans Team Matich
1970	Australian Sports Car Championship	6th	Matich SR4 Repco RB760	Rothmans Team Matich
1971	Tasman Series	2nd	McLaren M10B Repco Holden	Rothmans Team Matich
1971	SCCA L&M 5000 Continental Championship	6th	McLaren M10B Repco Holden	Rothmans Team Matich
1971	Australian Drivers' Championship	8th	McLaren M10C Repco Holden	Rothmans Team Matich
1972	Tasman Series	4th	Matich A50 Repco Holden	Frank Matich Pty Ltd
1972	Australian Drivers' Championship	1st	Matich A50 Repco Holden	Frank Matich Racing
1973	Tasman Series	3rd	Matich A50 Repco Holden; Matich A51 Repco Holden	Frank Matich
1973	SCCA L&M Championship	16th	Matich A51 Repco Holden	Early Racing Ent. Inc.
1974	Tasman Series	11th	Matich A53 Repco Holden	Frank Matich Racing

=== Complete Tasman Series results ===
Year	Team	Car	1	2	3	4	5	6	7	8	Rank	Points
1964	Total Team	Repco Brabham BT7A Coventry Climax	LEV	PUK; Ret	WIG	TER	SAN; Ret	WAR; Ret	LAK; Ret	LON; 3	10th	4
1965	Total Team	Repco Brabham BT7A Coventry Climax	PUK	LEV	WIG	TER	WAR; 3	SAN; Ret	LON; Ret		10th	4
1970	Rothmans Team Matich	McLaren M10A Chevrolet	LEV; 3	PUK; 1	WIG; 1	TER	SUR; 4	WAR; Ret	SAN; Ret		2nd	25
1971	Rothmans Team Matich	McLaren M10B Repco Holden	LEV; Ret	PUK; 2	WIG; 2	TER; 2	WAR; Ret	SAN; 3	SUR; 1		2nd	31
1972	Frank Matich Pty Ltd	Matich A50 Repco Holden	PUK; Ret	LEV; 2	WIG; 12	TER; 4	SUR; 3	WAR; 1	SAN; Ret	AIR; Ret	4th	22
1973	Frank Matich Racing Pty Ltd Frank Matich	Matich A50 Repco Holden	PUK; Ret	LEV; 2	WIG; 4	TER; Ret	SUR; 1	WAR; 2	SAN; 4	AIR; Ret	3rd	27
1974	Frank Matich	Matich A53 Repco Holden	LEV	PUK	WIG	TER	ORA	SUR; 3	SAN; Ret	AIR; 4	11th	7

=== Australian Grand Prix ===
Title	Venue	Car
1970 Australian Grand Prix	Warwick Farm	McLaren M10B Repco Holden
1971 Australian Grand Prix	Warwick Farm	Matich A50 Repco Holden

Sporting positions
Preceded by Chris Amon	Winner of the Australian Grand Prix; 1970 and 1971	Succeeded by Graham McRae
Preceded by Chris Amon	Winner of the New Zealand Grand Prix; 1970	Succeeded by Niel Allen
Preceded by Max Stewart	Winner of the Australian Drivers' Championship; 1972	Succeeded by John McCormack
