= 1970 Tasman Series =

Motor racing event in New Zealand and Australia

Seasons
- ← 1969 1971 →

The 1970 Tasman Series (officially the Tasman Championship for Drivers) was a motor racing competition staged in New Zealand and Australia for cars complying with the Tasman Formula. It was jointly organised by the Motorsport Association New Zealand Inc. (MANZ) and the Confederation of Australian Motor Sport (CAMS). It was the seventh Tasman Series, beginning on 3 January and ending on 22 February after seven races. The series was won by Graeme Lawrence of New Zealand, driving the Ferrari Dino 246T/69 that fellow New Zealander Chris Amon raced to win the 1969 Tasman Series.

1970 was a transitional year for the series, being the first year not involving the European Formula One teams which had given the Tasman Series its distinctive style. It was also the first year in which stock production engines of up to five litres cubic capacity were allowed, in short, Formula 5000. Entries arrived from both Europe and the United States, although not of the same quality of the earlier Tasman Formula era. Traditional 2.5 litre Tasman cars, like Lawrence's Ferrari, continued to race along with the 1.6 litre cars that filled much of the lower end of the grids during the Tasman era.

== Schedule ==
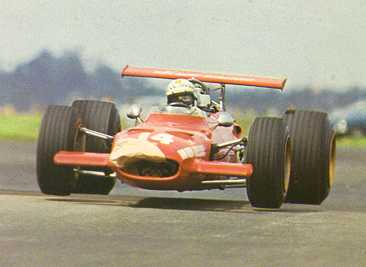
Graeme Lawrence won the series driving a Ferrari Dino 246T/69.

| Round | | Name | Circuit | Date | Winning driver | Winning car | Winning team | Report |
|---|---|---|---|---|---|---|---|---|
| New Zealand | | Bay Park International | Baypark | 28 December | (United States) Ron Grable | McLaren M10A Chevrolet | | Report |
| New Zealand | 1 | Levin International | Levin | 3 January | (New Zealand) Graeme Lawrence | Ferrari Dino 246T/69. | | Report |
| New Zealand | 2 | New Zealand Grand Prix | Pukekohe | 10 January | (Australia) Frank Matich | McLaren M10A Chevrolet | Rothmans Team Matich | Report |
| New Zealand | 3 | Lady Wigram Trophy | Wigram | 17 January | (Australia) Frank Matich | McLaren M10A Chevrolet | Rothmans Team Matich | Report |
| New Zealand | 4 | Teretonga International | Teretonga | 24 January | (New Zealand) Graham McRae | McLaren M10A Chevrolet | | Report |
| Australia | 5 | Rothmans 100 | Surfers Paradise | 8 February | (New Zealand) Graham McRae | McLaren M10A Chevrolet | | Report |
| Australia | 6 | International 100 | Warwick Farm | 15 February | (Australia) Kevin Bartlett | Mildren Mono Waggott | Alec Mildren Racing | Report |
| Australia | 7 | Golden 100 | Sandown | 22 February | (Australia) Neil Allen | McLaren M10B Chevrolet | | Report |

Note: The Bay Park International, held on 28 December 1969, one week before the first round, was a non-championship event.

== Points system ==
All scores from points-scoring races were counted

| Position | 1 | 2 | 3 | 4 | 5 | 6 |
|---|---|---|---|---|---|---|
| Points | 9 | 6 | 4 | 3 | 2 | 1 |

== Championship standings ==
| Pos | Driver | Car | Lev. | Puk. | Wig. | Ter. | Sur. | War. | San. | Pts |
|---|---|---|---|---|---|---|---|---|---|---|
| 1 | (New Zealand) Graeme Lawrence | Ferrari Dino 246T/69. | 1 | 3 | Ret | 4 | 3 | 3 | 2 | 30 |
| 2 | (Australia) Frank Matich | McLaren M10A Chevrolet | 3 | 1 | 1 | | 4 | Ret | Ret | 25 |
| 3 | (Australia) Kevin Bartlett | Mildren Waggott | Ret | 5 | Ret | 5 | 2 | 1 | Ret | 19 |
| = | (Australia) Max Stewart | Mildren Waggott | 2 | 9 | 3 | Ret | 9 | 2 | 4 | 19 |
| 5 | (New Zealand) Graham McRae | McLaren M10A Chevrolet | DNS | Ret | Ret | 1 | 1 | Ret | Ret | 18 |
| 6 | (United States) Ron Grable | McLaren M10A Chevrolet | DNS | 4 | 2 | 2 | 5 | Ret | Ret | 17 |
| 7 | (Australia) Neil Allen | McLaren M10B Chevrolet | ?? | 8 | Ret | | | 4 | 1 | 12 |
| 8 | (United States) Mike Goth | Surtees TS5 Chevrolet | 4 | 7 | 5 | 3 | 8 | 6 | Ret | 10 |
| 9 | (Sweden) Ulf Norinder | Lola T190 Chevrolet | 6 | 6 | Ret | Ret | 6 | 8 | 3 | 7 |
| 10 | (United Kingdom) Derek Bell | Brabham BT26 Ford | 9 | 2 | Ret | DNS | | | | 6 |
| 11 | (United States) Bill Simpson | Eagle Chevrolet | Ret | Ret | 4 | Ret | Ret | Ret | | 3 |
| 12 | (New Zealand) Dennis Marwood | Eisert Chevrolet | 5 | Ret | Ret | Ret | | | | 2 |
| = | (Australia) John Harvey | Repco Brabham BT23 | | | | | | 5 | Ret | 2 |
| = | (Australia) Alfredo Costanzo | McLaren M4A Cosworth | | | | | | Ret | 5 | 2 |
| 15 | (United Kingdom) Derrick Williams | Lola T142 Chevrolet | 10 | 10 | 9 | 6 | 10 | ?? | Ret | 1 |
| = | (United States) Mike Campbell | Forsgrini Mk 14 Ford | Ret | Ret | 6 | DNS | Ret | 10 | Ret | 1 |
| = | (Australia) Tony Stewart | Elfin 600B Ford | | | | | | | 6 | 1 |
| Pos | Driver | Car | Lev. | Puk. | Wig. | Ter. | Sur. | War. | San. | Pts |

=== Keys ===
| Abbreviation | Circuit |
|---|---|
| Lev. | Levin |
| Puk. | Pukekohe |
| San. | Sandown |
| Sur. | Surfers Paradise |
| Ter. | Teretonga |
| War. | Warwick Farm |
| Wig. | Wigram |

| Colour | Result |
|---|---|
| Gold | Winner |
| Silver | Second place |
| Bronze | Third place |
| Green | Points classification |
| Blue | Non-points classification |
| Blue | Non-classified finish (NC) |
| Purple | Retired, not classified (Ret) |
| Red | Did not qualify (DNQ) |
| Red | Did not pre-qualify (DNPQ) |
| Black | Disqualified (DSQ) |
| White | Did not start (DNS) |
| White | Withdrew (WD) |
| White | Race cancelled (C) |
| Blank | Did not practice (DNP) |
| Blank | Did not arrive (DNA) |
| Blank | Excluded (EX) |
