= 1972 Tasman Series =

Motorsport series in Australia and New Zealand

Seasons
- ← 1971 1973 →

The 1972 Tasman Series was a motor racing competition staged in New Zealand and Australia for racing cars complying with the Tasman Formula. The series, which began on 8 January and ended on 27 February after eight races, was the ninth annual Tasman Series. It was won by Graham McRae of New Zealand, driving a Leda GM1 Chevrolet.

== Races ==
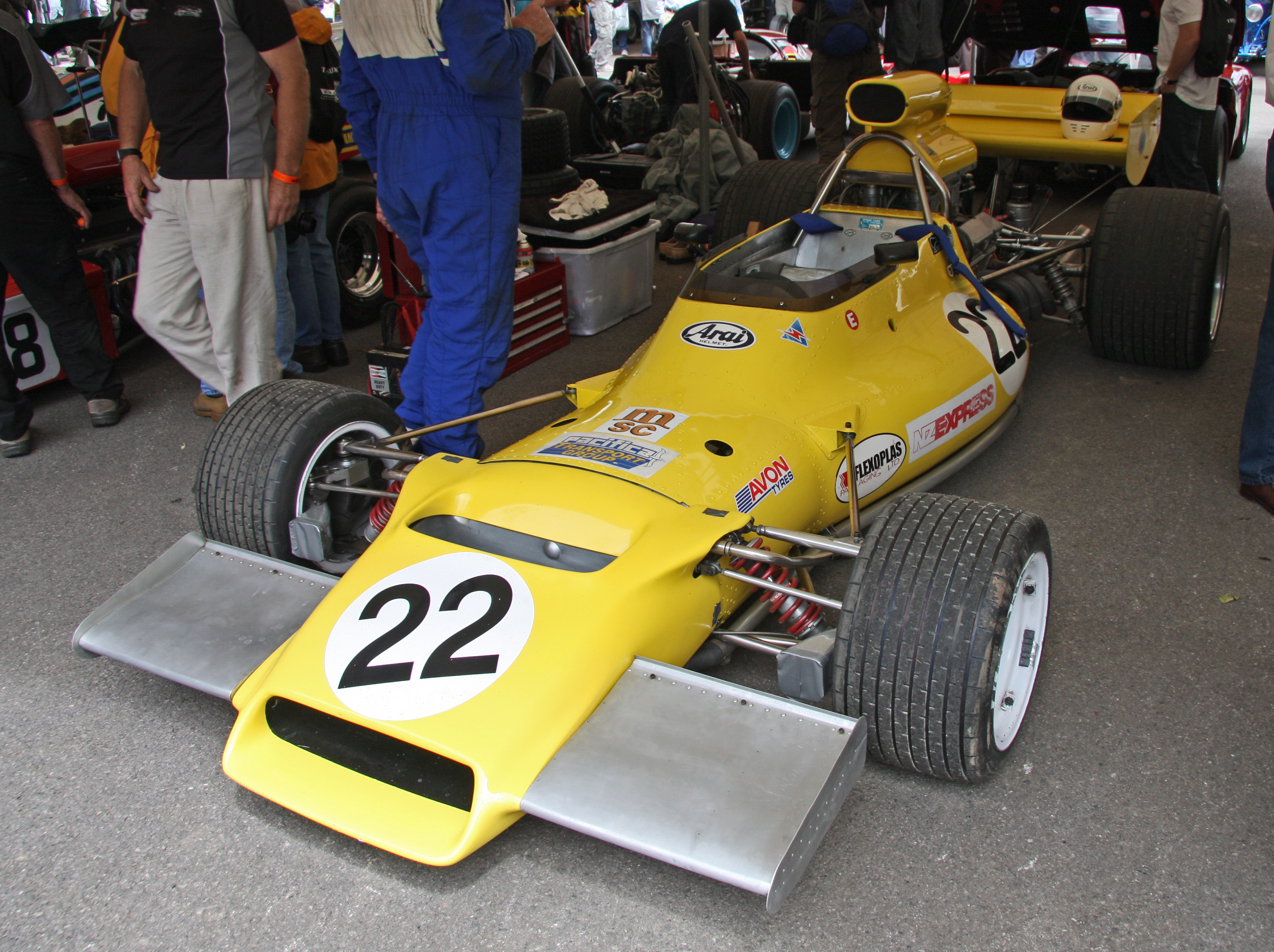
Graham McRae won the series driving a Leda GM1, similar to the McRae GM1 pictured

Additional information sourced from:

Round		Name	Circuit	Date	Winning driver	Winning car	Winning team	Report
New Zealand	1	New Zealand Grand Prix	Pukekohe	8 January	(Australia) Frank Gardner	Lola T300 Chevrolet	Lola Cars Limited	Report
New Zealand	2	Levin International	Levin	15 January	(New Zealand) Graham McRae	Leda GM1 Chevrolet	Crown Lynn	Report
New Zealand	3	Lady Wigram Trophy	Wigram	22 January	(New Zealand) Graham McRae	Leda GM1 Chevrolet	Grid International (NZ) Ltd	Report
New Zealand	4	Winfield Teretonga International	Teretonga	30 January	(Australia) Kevin Bartlett	McLaren M10B Chevrolet	Kevin Bartlett Shell Racing	Report
Australia	5	Rothmans 100	Surfers Paradise	6 February	(New Zealand) Graham McRae	Leda GM1 Chevrolet	Grid International (NZ) Ltd	Report
Australia	6	Rothmans 100	Warwick Farm	13 February	(Australia) Frank Matich	Matich A50 Repco Holden	Frank Matich Racing Pty Ltd	Report
Australia	7	Australian Grand Prix	Sandown	20 February	(New Zealand) Graham McRae	Leda GM1 Chevrolet	Grid International (NZ) Ltd	Report
Australia	8	Rothmans 100	Adelaide	27 February	(United Kingdom) David Hobbs	McLaren M22 Chevrolet	Hobbs Racing London	Report

== Points system ==
Series points were awarded at each round on the following basis.

Position	1	2	3	4	5	6
Points	9	6	4	3	2	1

All scores from all rounds were counted.

== Series standings ==
Pos	Driver	Car	Entrant	Puk	Lev	Wig	Ter	Sur	War	San	Ade	Pts
1	(New Zealand) Graham McRae	Leda GM1 Chevrolet	Grid International (NZ) Ltd; Crown Lynn	10	1	1	Ret	1	4	1	Ret	39
2	(United Kingdom) Mike Hailwood	Surtees TS8/11 Chevrolet	Team Surtees	2	3	2	Ret	6	5	4	2	28
3	(Australia) Frank Gardner	Lola T300 Chevrolet	Lola Cars Limited	1	Ret			2	2	2		27
4	(Australia) Frank Matich	Matich A50 Repco Holden	Frank Matich Pty Ltd	Ret	2	12	4	3	1	Ret	Ret	22
5	(Australia) Kevin Bartlett	McLaren M10B Chevrolet	Kevin Bartlett Shell Racing	4	Ret	3	1	Ret	3	Ret	Ret	20
=	(United Kingdom) David Hobbs	McLaren M22 Chevrolet	David Hobbs London	3	11	11	Ret	4	Ret	3	1	20
7	(Belgium) Teddy Pilette	McLaren M10B Chevrolet	Racing Team VDS	6	5	7	2	5	7	6	3	16
8	(New Zealand) David Oxton	Begg FM4 Chevrolet	Begg Engineering Ltd	Ret	6	5	3					7
9	(Australia) Max Stewart	Elfin MR5 Repco Holden	Max Stewart Motors - Seiko Service Centre	5	4	Ret	Ret	9	Ret	Ret	Ret	5
=	(United States) Evan Noyes	McLaren M18 Chevrolet	Gemco Racing	8	7	4	5					5
11	(Australia) John McCormack	Elfin MR5 Repco Holden	Elfin Sports Cars	7	8	Ret	6	Ret	6	Ret	5	4
12	(Australia) Johnnie Walker	Elfin MR5 Repco Holden	City-State Racing Team								4	3
13	(Australia) Warwick Brown	McLaren M10B Chevrolet	Pat Burke Racing					7	9	5	Ret	2
14	(New Zealand) Frank Radisich	McLaren M10B Repco Holden	Henderson Central Motors	Ret	9	6	Ret	10	14	13	7	1
=	(Australia) Gary Campbell	Lola T300 Chevrolet	Provincial Motors					11	11	11	6	1
Pos	Driver	Car	Entrant	Puk	Lev	Wig	Ter	Sur	War	San	Ade	Pts

Colour	Result
Gold	Winner
Silver	Second place
Bronze	Third place
Green	Points classification
Blue	Non-points classification
Blue	Non-classified finish (NC)
Purple	Retired, not classified (Ret)
Red	Did not qualify (DNQ)
Red	Did not pre-qualify (DNPQ)
Black	Disqualified (DSQ)
White	Did not start (DNS)
White	Withdrew (WD)
White	Race cancelled (C)
Blank	Did not practice (DNP)
Blank	Did not arrive (DNA)
Blank	Excluded (EX)
