= John McCormack (racing driver) =

Australian racing driver

John McCormack (born 9 July 1938) is a former Australian racing driver. Originally from Burnie, Tasmania, McCormack became one of the leading Formula 5000 racers in Australia during the 1970s.

McCormack won the Australian Drivers' Championship three times, driving an Elfin MR5 Repco Holden in 1973, an Elfin MR6 Repco Holden in 1975, and in an ex-British Grand Prix winning McLaren M23 powered by a Repco Leyland V8 engine in 1977. He also won consecutive New Zealand Grand Prix in 1973 and 1974. McCormack was competitive in the Tasman Series and Australian Grand Prix his best results being second in both events. Most of McCormack's major wins were under the banner of the Ansett Team Elfin.

As well as open-wheelers, McCormack drove sports sedans, winning the 1974 Toby Lee Sports Sedan Series driving his highly modified Chrysler Valiant Charger-Repco Holden V8 which underneath the Charger shell had specifications virtually identical to those of his Formula 5000 car.

In 1979, McCormack was one of the first drivers to race a Chevrolet Camaro (filling in for fellow F5000 racer Kevin Bartlett who was nursing a broken leg) at the Hardie-Ferodo 1000 at Bathurst. After numerous problems with the big Chev during practice, McCormack and co-driver Bob Forbes started 60th (out of 63), and were a DNF after just 62 laps when the 350ci V8 failed.

== Career results ==
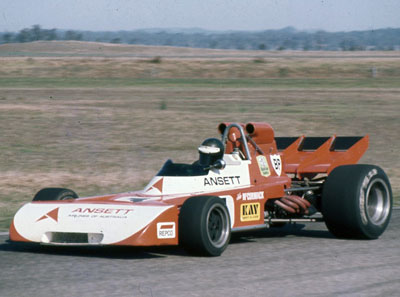
John McCormack in an Elfin MR5 at the Surfers Paradise round of the 1972 Australian Drivers' Championship

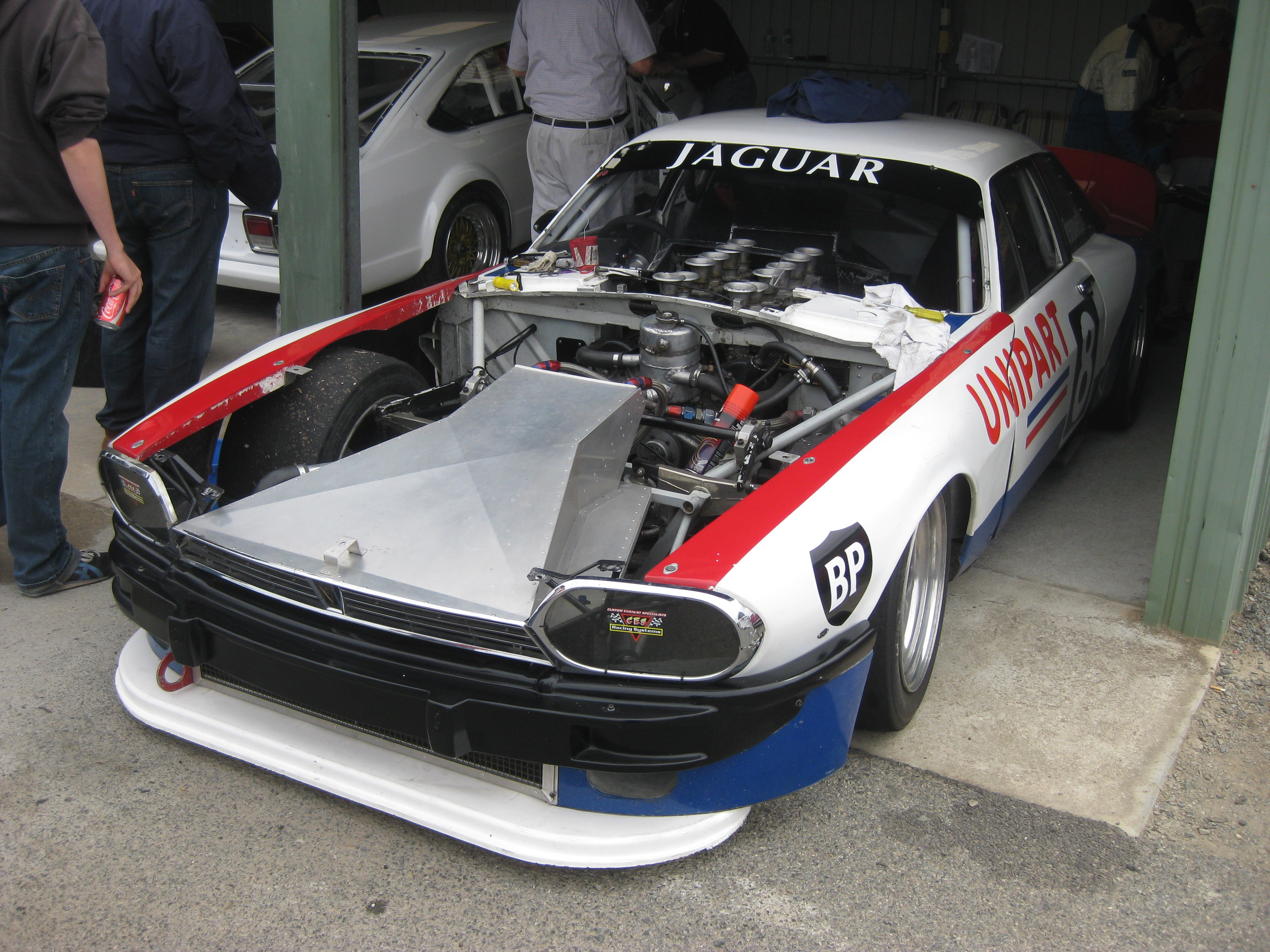
John McCormack placed 4th in the 1980 Australian Sports Sedan Championship driving this Jaguar XJ-S (pictured in 2013 in its 1980 livery)

| Season | Series | Position | Car | Entrant / team |
|---|---|---|---|---|
| 1966 | Australian Drivers' Championship | 10th | Repco Brabham BT4 Coventry Climax | J McCormack |
| 1967 | Australian Drivers' Championship | 9th | Repco Brabham BT4 Coventry Climax | John McCormack |
| 1970 | Australian Drivers' Championship | 7th | Elfin 600C Coventry Climax | John McCormack |
| 1971 | Australian Drivers' Championship | 4th | Elfin MR5 Repco-Holden | Ansett Team Elfin |
| 1972 | Tasman Series | 11th | Elfin MR5 Repco-Holden | Ansett Team Elfin |
| 1972 | Australian Drivers' Championship | 3rd | Elfin MR5 Repco-Holden | Ansett Team Elfin |
| 1973 | Tasman Series | 2nd | Elfin MR5 Repco-Holden | Ansett Team Elfin |
| 1973 | Australian Drivers' Championship | 1st | Elfin MR5 Repco-Holden | Ansett Team Elfin |
| 1974 | Tasman Series | 4th | Elfin MR5 Repco-Holden; Elfin ML6 Repco-Leyland | Ansett Team Elfin |
| 1974 | Australian Drivers' Championship | 5th | Elfin ML6 Repco-Leyland; Elfin MR5 Repco-Holden | Ansett Team Elfin |
| 1974 | Toby Lee Sports Sedan Series | 1st | Chrysler VJ Valiant Charger Repco-Holden | Ansett Team |
| 1975 | Tasman Series | 4th | Elfin MR6 Repco-Holden | Ansett Team Elfin |
| 1975 | Australian Drivers' Championship | 1st | Elfin MR6 Repco-Holden | Ansett Team Elfin |
| 1976 | Rothmans International Series | = 10th | Elfin MR6 Repco-Holden | Ansett Team Elfin |
| 1976 | Australian Drivers' Championship | 3rd | McLaren M23 Repco-Leyland | Budget |
| 1977 | Rothmans International Series | = 9th | McLaren M23 Repco-Leyland | Budget Rent-A-Car System |
| 1977 | Australian Drivers' Championship | 1st | McLaren M23 Repco-Leyland | Budget |
| 1978 | Australian Drivers' Championship | 2nd | McLaren M23 Repco-Leyland | McCormack Uniparts Team |
| 1979 | Rothmans International Series | 9th | McLaren M23 Repco-Leyland | McCormack Uniparts Team |
| 1980 | Australian Sports Sedan Championship | 4th | Jaguar XJ-S | McCormack – Unipart Racing |

== Literature ==
- Australian Motor Racing Annual, 1972, page 40
- Australian Competition Yearbook, 1974, pages 59–60
- Australian Competition Yearbook, 1975, pages 46, 146
- Australian Competition Yearbook, 1976, pages 117-119
- Australian Competition Yearbook, 1977, page 85
- Australian Competition Yearbook, 1978, pages 85, 110
- "New Zealand Titles". MotorSport New Zealand.

Sporting positions
| Preceded by Frank Matich | Winner of the Australian Drivers' Championship; 1973 | Succeeded by Max Stewart |
| Preceded by Frank Gardner | Winner of the New Zealand Grand Prix; 1973 and 1974 | Succeeded by Warwick Brown |
| Preceded by Max Stewart | Winner of the Australian Drivers' Championship; 1975 | Succeeded by John Leffler |
| Preceded by John Leffler | Winner of the Australian Drivers' Championship; 1977 | Succeeded by Graham McRae |
