= 1973 Australian Drivers' Championship =

Motor racing competition

Seasons
- ← 1972 1974 →

The 1973 Australian Drivers' Championship was a CAMS sanctioned national motor racing title open to drivers of Australian Formula 1 and Australian Formula 2 cars. It was the seventeenth Australian Drivers' Championship and the championship winner was awarded the 1973 CAMS "Gold Star".

The championship was won by John McCormack driving an Elfin MR5 Repco Holden.

== Schedule ==
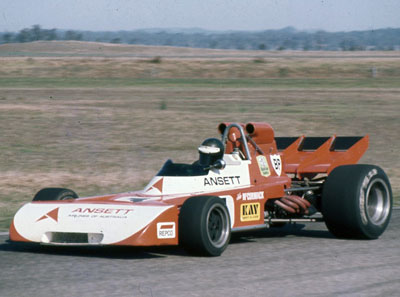
John McCormack won the championship driving an Elfin MR5 (pictured in 1972)

The championship was contested over a five-round series with one race per round. There was to be a round at Symmons Plains on 23 September in an event shared with the 1973 Australian Formula 2 Championship. However, as just four Formula 5000 cars were entered, organisers decided to run the event only for Formula Two cars. There was also originally to be an event at Warwick Farm before that facility closed suddenly earlier in 1973. As a result of these cancellations, a second event was added at Phillip Island in late November.

Round	Name	Circuit	Date	Winner	Car	Report
1	Glyn Scott Memorial Trophy	Surfers Paradise	2 September	John McCormack	Elfin MR5 Repco Holden	
2	Channel 7 Trophy	Adelaide International Raceway	7 October	John McCormack	Elfin MR5 Repco Holden	
3	Victorian Road Racing Championship	Phillip Island	14 October	Johnnie Walker	Lola T330 Repco Holden	
4	Australian Grand Prix	Sandown	4 November	Graham McRae	McRae GM2 Chevrolet	Report
5		Phillip Island	25 November	Johnnie Walker	Lola T330 Repco Holden	

== Points system ==
Championship points were awarded on a 9–6–4–3–2–1 basis for the top six places in each round with all rounds counting towards each driver's points total. Only drivers holding a CAMS General Competition License were eligible to score points.

== Results ==
Position	Driver	No.	Car	Entrant	Sur	Ade	Phi	San	Phi	Total
1	John McCormack	3	Elfin MR5 Repco-Holden	Ansett Team Elfin	9	9	–	9	6	33
2	Johnnie Walker	25	Lola T330 Repco-Holden	John Walker Motor Racing	–	6	9	6	9	30
3	Garrie Cooper	2	Elfin MR5 Repco-Holden	Ansett Team Elfin	6	1	6	3	4	20
4	Leo Geoghegan	9	Birrana 273 Ford	Grace Bros – 5AD City State Racing Team	4	2	–	–	–	6
4	Bruce Allison	62	Bowin P6 Ford	Hobby and Toyland Racing	3	–	3	–	–	6
4	Enno Busselmann	18	Birrana 273 Ford	Bob and Marj Brown	2	3	–	1	–	6
7	Max Stewart	6	Lola T330 Chevrolet	Seiko Service Centre	–	4	–	–	–	4
7	Kevin Bartlett	5	Lola T330 Chevrolet	Chesterfield Filter Racing	–	–	4	–	–	4
7	Howie Sangster	14	McLaren M18/M22 Chevrolet	Don O'Sullivan Racing Pty. Ltd.	–	–	–	4	–	4
7	Chas Talbot		Elfin 600E Ford	C. Talbot	–	–	2	–	2	4
11	Paul Feltham		Birrana 273 Ford	Feltham Team Racing	–	–	–	–	3	3
12	John Leffler	34	Elfin MR5 Repco-Holden	Seiko Service Centre	–	–	–	2	–	2
12	Chris Farrell	36	Dolphin 732 Ford	Chris Farrell	1	–	1	–	–	2
14	Bob Minogue		Elfin 600B Ford	R. A. Minogue	–	–	–	–	1	1

Note: The Australian Grand Prix was won by New Zealander Graham McRae. However, as the Australian Drivers' Championship was open only to holders of a CAMS General Competition License, 9 points were awarded to the highest placed eligible driver, John McCormack, 6 points to the second highest placed eligible driver etc.

== Championship name ==
Conditions for the championship were promulgated by CAMS under the name "Australian Formula 1 Championship – Gold Star Award", with mention of the requirement for the phrase "Australian Champion Driver" to be reserved exclusively for the winner of the CAMS Gold Star. Historic records published by CAMS use the term Australian Drivers' Championship and that title has been used here.
