= 1972 Australian Drivers' Championship =

Motor racing competition

Seasons
- ← 1971 1973 →

The 1972 Australian Drivers' Championship was a CAMS sanctioned Australian motor racing title open to Australian Formula 1 and Australian Formula 2 racing cars. It was the 16th Australian Drivers' Championship to be awarded by CAMS. The championship winner, Frank Matich, was awarded the 1972 CAMS Gold Star.

== Calendar ==
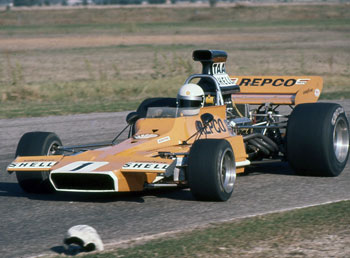
Frank Matich (Matich A50) won the 1972 Australian Drivers' Championship

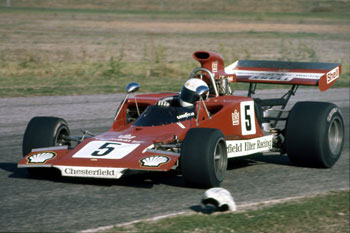
Kevin Bartlett (Lola T300) placed second

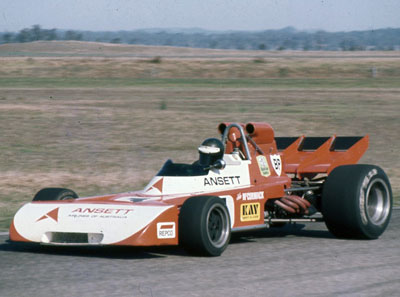
John McCormack (Elfin MR5) placed third

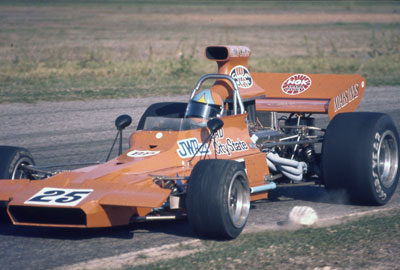
John Walker (Matich A50) placed fourth

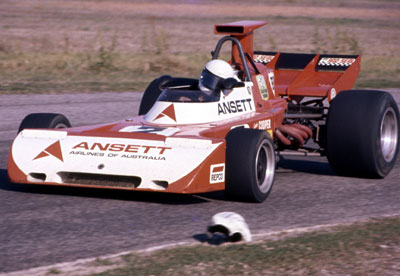
Garrie Cooper (Elfin MR5) placed ninth

The championship was contested over a six-round series with one race per round.

| Round | Race name | Circuit | State | Date | Winner | Car |
| 1 | Victoria Trophy | Sandown Park | Victoria | 16 April | Frank Matich | Matich A50 Repco Holden |
| 2 | Belle Magazine Trophy | Oran Park | New South Wales | 25 June | Frank Matich | Matich A50 Repco Holden |
| 3 | Glynn Scott Memorial Trophy | Surfers Paradise | Queensland | 27 August | Frank Matich | Matich A50 Repco Holden |
| 4 | | Symmons Plains | Tasmania | 24 September | John McCormack | Elfin MR5 Repco Holden |
| 5 | Channel 7 Trophy | Adelaide International Raceway | South Australia | 8 October | Kevin Bartlett | Lola T300 Chevrolet |
| 6 | Sam Hordern Trophy | Warwick Farm | New South Wales | 5 November | Frank Matich | Matich A50 Repco Holden |

An additional round, scheduled to be held at Lakeside in Queensland was cancelled.

== Points system ==
Championship points were awarded on a 9-6-4-3-2-1 basis for the first six places in each race. Points from the best five results could be retained by each driver.

== Championship results ==
| Position | Driver | Car | Entrant | San. | Ora. | Sur. | Sym. | Ade. | War. | Total |
| 1 | Frank Matich | Matich A50 Repco Holden | Frank Matich Racing | 9 | 9 | 9 | - | - | 9 | 36 |
| 2 | Kevin Bartlett | Lola T300 Chevrolet | Shell / Chesterfield Racing | - | 6 | 3 | - | 9 | 6 | 24 |
| 3 | John McCormack | Elfin MR5 Repco Holden | Ansett Team Elfin | 4 | - | - | 9 | 4 | 3 | 20 |
| 4 | John Walker | Elfin MR5 Repco Holden & Matich A50 Repco Holden | 5AD / City State Racing | 2 | 3 | 6 | - | 3 | - | 14 |
| = | Warwick Brown | McLaren M10B Chevrolet | Pat Burke Racing | 1 | 2 | 4 | - | 6 | 1 | 14 |
| 6 | Max Stewart | Elfin MR5 Repco Holden | Max Stewart Motors - Seiko | - | 4 | - | - | - | 4 | 8 |
| 7 | Stan Keen | Elfin MR5 Ford | Stan Keen Motors | - | - | - | 6 | 1 | - | 7 |
| 8 | Bob Muir | Lola T300 Chevrolet | Robert Muir Motors | 6 | - | - | - | - | - | 6 |
| 9 | Garrie Cooper | Elfin MR5 Repco Holden | Ansett Team Elfin | 3 | - | 2 | - | - | - | 5 |
| = | Gary Campbell | Lola T300 Chevrolet | Provincial Motors | - | - | 1 | - | 2 | 2 | 5 |
| 11 | Larry Perkins | Elfin 600B Ford | Provincial Motors | - | - | - | 4 | - | - | 4 |
| 12 | Tony Stewart | Dolphin England | AE Stewart | - | - | - | 3 | - | - | 3 |
| 13 | Ivan Tighe | Elfin 600B Ford | I Tighe | - | - | - | 2 | - | - | 2 |
| 14 | Ken Hastings | McLaren M4A Ford | K Hastings | - | - | - | 1 | - | - | 1 |
| = | Jack Bono | Elfin 600B Ford | Graham Collier | - | 1 | - | - | - | - | 1 |
