= 1971 Tasman Series =

Motor racing competition in Australia and New Zealand

The 1971 Tasman Series was a motor racing competition staged in New Zealand and Australia for cars complying with the Tasman Formula. The series, which began on 2 January and ended on 28 February after seven races, was the eighth annual Tasman Series. It was won by Graham McRae of New Zealand, driving a McLaren M10B Chevrolet.

== Races ==
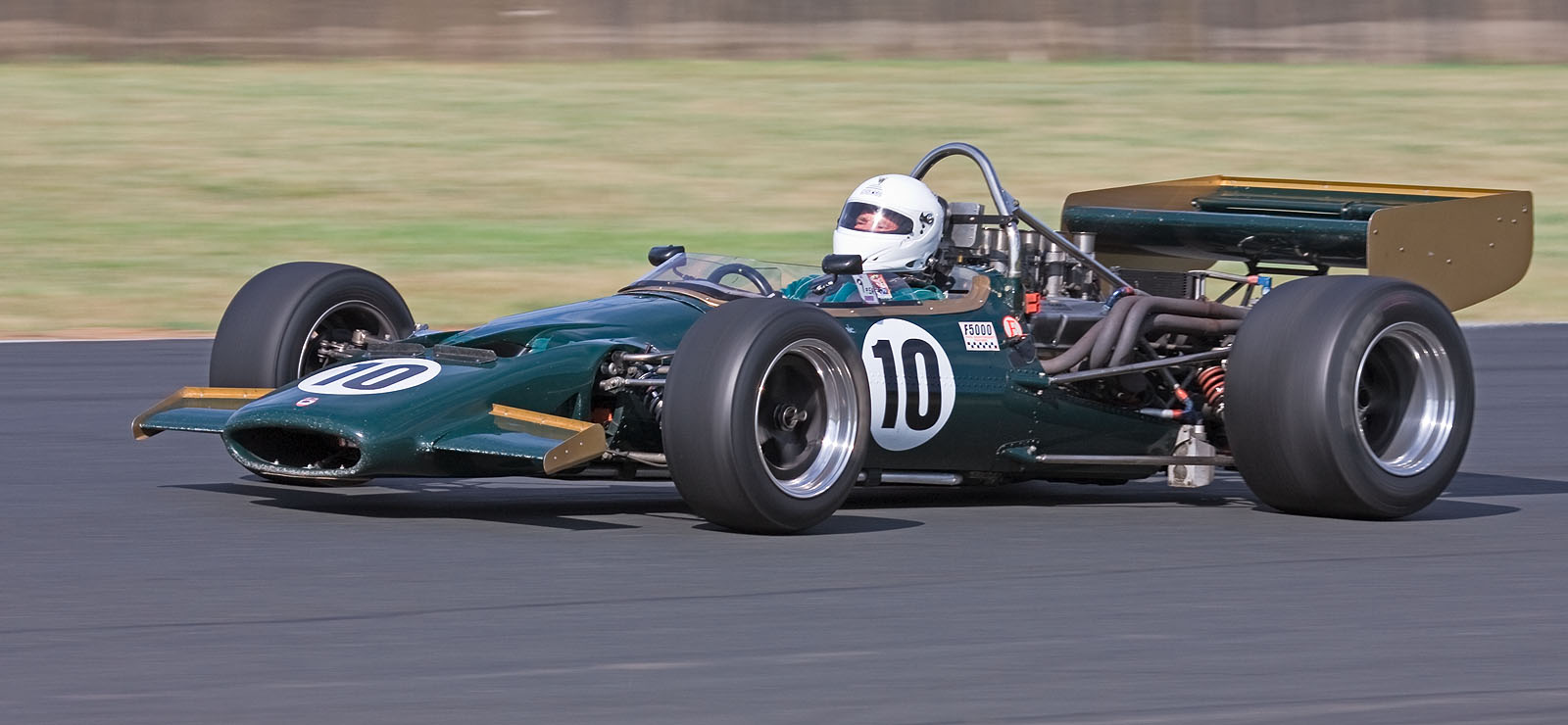
Graham McRae won the series driving a McLaren M10B, similar to that pictured above

The series was contested over seven races.

		Name	Circuit	Date	Winning driver	Winning car	Winning entrant	Report
New Zealand	1	Levin International	Levin	2 January	(New Zealand) Graham McRae	McLaren M10B Chevrolet	Crown Lynn	Report
New Zealand	2	New Zealand Grand Prix	Pukekohe	9 January	(Australia) Neil Allen	McLaren M10B Chevrolet	N.E. Allen Auto Indust. (Pty) Ltd	Report
New Zealand	3	Lady Wigram Trophy	Wigram	16 January	(New Zealand) Graham McRae	McLaren M10B Chevrolet	Crown Lynn	Report
New Zealand	4	Teretonga International	Teretonga	23 January	(Australia) Neil Allen	McLaren M10B Chevrolet	N.E. Allen Auto Indust. (Pty) Ltd	Report
Australia	5	Rothmans 100	Warwick Farm	14 February	(Australia) Frank Gardner	Lola T192 Chevrolet	Lola Cars Ltd	Report
Australia	6	Rothmans Golden 100	Sandown	21 February	(New Zealand) Graham McRae	McLaren M10B Chevrolet	Crown Lynn	Report
Australia	7	Rothmans 100	Surfers Paradise	28 February	(Australia) Frank Matich	McLaren M10B Repco Holden	Rothmans Team Matich	Report

== Points system ==
Series points were awarded at each race on the following basis:

Position	1	2	3	4	5	6
Points	9	6	4	3	2	1

All points scored by each driver were retained to determine final series placings.

== Series standings ==
Pos	Driver	Car	Entrant	Lev	Puk	Wig	Ter	War	San	Sur	Pts
1	(New Zealand) Graham McRae	McLaren M10B Chevrolet	Crown Lynn	1	3	1	Ret	8	1	3	35
2	(Australia) Frank Matich	McLaren M10B Repco Holden	Rothmans Team Matich	Ret	2	2	2	Ret	3	1	31
3	(Australia) Neil Allen	McLaren M10B Chevrolet	NE Allen Auto Indust. (Pty) Ltd	2	1	Ret	1	4	Ret	Ret	27
4	(Australia) Frank Gardner	Lola T192 Chevrolet	Lola Cars Ltd		Ret	4	Ret	1	Ret	2	18
5	(New Zealand) Chris Amon	March 701 Cosworth; Lotus 70 Ford	STP Corporation	3	9	5		2	4		15
6	(Belgium) Teddy Pilette	McLaren M10B Chevrolet	Racing Team VDS	6	Ret	Ret	3	5	2		13
7	(New Zealand) Graeme Lawrence	Ferrari Dino 246T/69	Air New Zealand	Ret	6	3	Ret	Ret	6	4	9
8	(Australia) Kevin Bartlett	Mildren Chevrolet	Alec Mildren Racing Pty Ltd	Ret	Ret	Ret	4	3	Ret	DNS	7
9	(Canada) John Cannon	McLaren M10B Chevrolet	Hogan Racing Ltd	5	5	Ret	Ret	7	DNS	7	4
=	(United Kingdom) Malcolm Guthrie	Lola T190 Chevrolet	Guthrie Racing		7	6	5	DNS	Ret	6	4
11	(New Zealand) David Oxton	Lotus 70 Ford		4	Ret	DNS	7				3
=	(United States) Mike Eyerly	Surtees TS8 Chevrolet	Bonphil Racing	Ret	4	DNS	9	DNS			3
=	(Australia) Bob Muir	Mildren Mono Waggott	Robert Muir Motors Pty Ltd					6	8	5	3
14	(United Kingdom) Keith Holland	McLaren M10B Chevrolet	Road & Track Auto Service					9	5	Ret	2
15	(Australia) Leo Geoghegan	Lotus 59B Waggott	Geoghegans Sporty Cars			8	6	Ret			1
Pos	Driver	Car	Entrant	Lev	Puk	Wig	Ter	War	San	Sur	Pts

Colour	Result
Gold	Winner
Silver	Second place
Bronze	Third place
Green	Points classification
Blue	Non-points classification
Blue	Non-classified finish (NC)
Purple	Retired, not classified (Ret)
Red	Did not qualify (DNQ)
Red	Did not pre-qualify (DNPQ)
Black	Disqualified (DSQ)
White	Did not start (DNS)
White	Withdrew (WD)
White	Race cancelled (C)
Blank	Did not practice (DNP)
Blank	Did not arrive (DNA)
Blank	Excluded (EX)
