= David Oxton =

New Zealand racing driver

- Nationality: New Zealander
- Born: 22 December 1945 (age 80)
- Retired: 1987

Australian Touring Car Championship
- Years active: 1986
- Teams: David Oxton
- Starts: 3
- Wins: 0
- Poles: 0
- Best finish: 17th in 1986

Previous series
- 1968-75 1970 1970-72 1970-74, 1977-78, 1981-82 1973 1973 1977, 1980-84 1977-84 1986: Tasman Series; Formula A Continental; NZ Formula Ford Championship; New Zealand Gold Star; British Formula Atlantic Championship; Formula 5000 Great Britain; Formula Atlantic Canada; NZ International Formula Pacific Series; Australian Drivers' Championship; Australian Touring Car Championship

Championship titles
- 1970-71 1971-72 1971-72 1972-73 1973-74 1980-81 1981-82: NZ Formula Ford Championship; New Zealand Gold Star; NZ Formula Ford Championship; New Zealand Gold Star; New Zealand Gold Star; NZ Formula Pacific Series; NZ Formula Pacific Series; New Zealand Gold Star

David Oxton (born 22 December 1945) is a former New Zealand racing driver. Oxton spent the majority of his career racing open wheel cars in New Zealand and Australia but did drive touring cars late in his career.

== Career ==
Oxton's career started in the late 1960s, driving a Daimler SP250 in New Zealand motorsport events and in 1968 he made the move to open-wheel racing. Oxton won two consecutive New Zealand Formula Ford Championships from 1970 to 1972. and in 1971. he debuted in both the New Zealand Gold Star Championship and the Tasman Series. During the 1970s, Oxton would go on to win three New Zealand Gold Stars but did not achieve the same success in the Tasman Series, with a best finish of eighth in 1972 and 1974.

In 1973, Oxton travelled to the United Kingdom to compete in Formula Atlantic and Formula 5000 but he did not achieve great success on his overseas venture. He also competed in the BRDC International Trophy, a non-championship Formula One race, at Silverstone the same year, but failed to finish. Oxton competed in Formula Atlantic in Canada in 1977, a year in which he also began competing in the New Zealand International Formula Pacific Series. He finished tenth in the series in 1977 but would go on to win the title in the 1980–81 season and finish runner-up in 1983. Oxton won his fourth New Zealand Gold Star in the 1981–82 season.

The 1980s saw Oxton begin racing touring cars, starting with the Benson & Hedges Saloon Car Series in 1982, finishing 2nd at Pukekohe with star Australian driver Peter Brock in a HDT Special Vehicles Holden VC Commodore.

Oxton then partnered Brock in the Holden Dealer Team in Australia's first year of Group A touring car racing in 1985 at the Castrol 500 at Sandown Raceway in Melbourne, their VK Commodore suffering engine failure after just 41 laps. Brock retained Oxton for the 1985 James Hardie 1000 at Bathurst, but the pair again failed to finish. They ran strong all day, with then 8-time Bathurst 500/1000 winner Brock doing the bulk of the driving and Oxton only completing a 40 lap "lunch time" stint. Brock was second and only 30 seconds behind the leading TWR/JRA Jaguar XJ-S V12 of John Goss with three laps remaining. That was until the Holden V8 engine suffered a broken timing chain, the cars weak link in 1985. The timing chain broke on Conrod Straight, forcing Brock into the pits and into retirement.

Oxton went on to race in the 1986 Australian Touring Car Championship, finishing 17th in the series after competing in three of the ten rounds in an ex-Andy Rouse Ford Sierra XR4Ti. Oxton had earlier in the year shared the Sierra with Rouse at the Wellington 500. Rouse had put the car on pole position but Oxton didn't get to drive after the car suffered suspension failure in the early laps and was left opposite the pits for the remainder of the race.

With the Wellington 500 becoming a part of the 1987 World Touring Car Championship, Oxton re-joined the HDT, by now without factory support from Holden. He partnered Australian television commentator Neil Crompton in the team's second VL Commodore SS Group A, the car in which Brock, David Parsons and Peter McLeod had won Bathurst in a few weeks earlier.

== Career results ==
Season	Series	Position	Car	Team
1970	SCCA Continental Championship	24th	Lotus 70 Ford	
1970-71	New Zealand Formula Ford Championship	**1st**	Elfin 600 Superford	
1971	Tasman Series	10th	Lotus 70; March 701	STP Corporation
1972	Tasman Series	8th	Begg FM4	Begg Engineering
1971-72	New Zealand Gold Star Championship	**1st**	Begg FM4	David Oxton Racing
1971-72	New Zealand Formula Ford Championship	**1st**	Elfin Superford	Winfield Racing Team
1972-73	New Zealand Gold Star Championship	**1st**	Begg FM5	
1973	Tasman Series	10th	Begg FM5	Begg Engineering
1973	British Formula Atlantic Championship	16th	Lyncar 003	
1973	Rothmans European Formula 5000 Championship	15th	Begg FM5	Begg Engineering
1973-74	New Zealand Gold Star Championship	**1st**	Begg FM5	David Oxton Racing
1974	Tasman Series	8th	Begg FM5	David Oxton Racing
1975	Tasman Series	12th	Lola T330	David Oxton Racing
1977	New Zealand International Formula Pacific Series	10th	Chevron B29	Oxton Motors
1977	Formula Atlantic Canada	11th	Tui BH2	Team Tui
1980-81	New Zealand International Formula Pacific Series	**1st**	Ralt RT4	
1981-82	New Zealand Gold Star Championship	**1st**	Ralt RT4/80	
1983	New Zealand International Formula Pacific Series	**2nd**	Ralt RT4/81	Oxton Motors
1984	New Zealand International Formula Pacific Series	4th	Ralt RT4/82	Oxton Motors
1986	Australian Touring Car Championship	17th	Ford Sierra XR4Ti	David Oxton

=== Complete New Zealand Grand Prix results ===
Year	Team	Car	Qualifying	Result
1972	(New Zealand) Begg Engineering	Begg FM4 - Chevrolet	?	DNF
1973	(New Zealand) Begg Engineering	Begg FM5 - Chevrolet	?	DNF
1974	(New Zealand) Begg Engineering	Begg FM5 - Chevrolet	?	4th
1977	(New Zealand) Oxton Motors	Chevron B29 - Ford	?	5th
1978	(New Zealand) Oxton Motors	Chevron B34 - Ford	11th	6th
1979	(New Zealand) Oxton Motors	Chevron B34 - Ford-Hart	5th	7th
1980	(New Zealand) Oxton Motors	Chevron B34 - Ford-Hart	5th	10th
1981	(New Zealand) Oxton Motors	Ralt RT4 - Ford	**2nd**	**2nd**
1982	(New Zealand) Oxton Motors	Ralt RT4 - Ford	5th	5th
1983	(New Zealand) Oxton Motors	Ralt RT4 - Ford	**2nd**	**1st**

=== Complete Bathurst 1000 results ===
Year	Team	Co-drivers	Car	Class	Laps	Pos.	Class pos.
1985	(Australia) Mobil Holden Dealer Team	(Australia) Peter Brock	Holden VK Commodore SS	C	160	DNF	DNF

=== Complete World Touring Car Championship results ===
(key) (Races in bold indicate pole position) (Races in italics indicate fastest lap)

Year	Team	Car	1	2	3	4	5	6	7	8	9	10	11	DC	Points
1987	(Australia) HDT Racing P/L	Holden VL Commodore SS Group A	MNZ	JAR	DIJ	NUR	SPA	BNO	SIL	BAT	CAL	WEL; Ret	FJI	N/C	0†

† Not eligible for series points
