= Graeme Lawrence =

New Zealand racing driver

Graeme Harry Lawrence (born 25 December 1940) is a race car driver from New Zealand. He started serious motor racing in the National 1.5 litre series (SR equivalent of F3) winning the series decisively in 1968 ahead of David Oxton and Ken Smith. Lawrence then ran half a European F2 series in an uncompetitive semi works F2 McLaren, he found the racing harder than expected and was shaken, by his experience racing in Germany at the Hockenheim race in the rain, were Jim Clark was killed. McLaren allowed Lawrence to build up another F2 chassis in his works and was 2nd in the SR Gold Star series in the car, and first ST driver home in the Tasman races at Pukekohe and Levin.

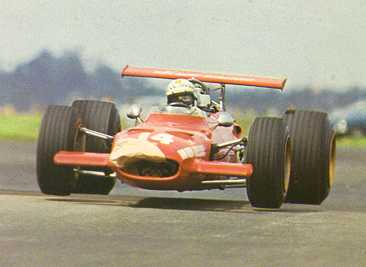
Lawrence won the 1970 Tasman Series driving a Ferrari 246T

Lawrence was the first New Zealander to win a race in the Tasman Series, in 1970. Although he won only the one race that year, he was Tasman Series champion, driving Chris Amon's old Dino 246 Tasmania. He won New Zealand's Gold Star Race Championship for single seaters in the 1970-71 driving the Ferrari, and then ran the full Can Am series in an elderly McLaren sponsored by Canadian interests. Lawrence regularly qualified in mid grid, and suggested he still had international potential. This was confirmed by brilliant driving of the underpowered Dino 2.4 in the 1971 Tasman, at Levin he passed Amon in a March 701, Oxton and Cannon and was closing on 2nd placed Neil Allen, when he collided with a lapped back marker and at Levin he finished third ahead of Amon and Gardiner, but a bad crash in a new Lola F5000 at Pukekohe in 1972, left Lawrence with the Lola limp and largely ended any chance of a racing career in the United States and he did not fully recover till the 1974-75 race season driving a Lola T332 Formula 5000 car. which Lawrence set up largely to the pattern of the US F5000 Parnelli cars of Andretti and Unser. In the 1975 Tasman he was narrowly defeated by Warwick Brown, but for the following two season he lost his Marlboro and Singapore Airline sponsorship and his Lola 332T was less reliable, although in the 1976 NZ international series, he briefly led at Pukekohe and won at Teretonga and in 1977 a devastating drive at Oran Park, from the back of the field took him 4th at behind Alan Jones, Peter Gethin and Warwick Brown, before retiring, mid race. In Australasian F5000 races, Lawrence had driven hard, racing for victory rather than adopting the percentage driving tactics of say a John McCormick, David Oxton or John Walker, inevitably that resulted in more retirements and crashes.

Lawrence has also won the Formula Pacific Malaysian Grand Prix in 1978 and the Formula Libre Singapore Grand Prix in 1969, 1970 and 1971. Lawrence competed in the 1970 Can-Am season, driving the "Spirit of Edmonton" ex-George Eaton McLaren M12 #60-04 to points finishes.

Sporting positions
Preceded by Chris Amon	Tasman Series Champion; 1970	Succeeded by Graham McRae
