= Elfin MR5 =

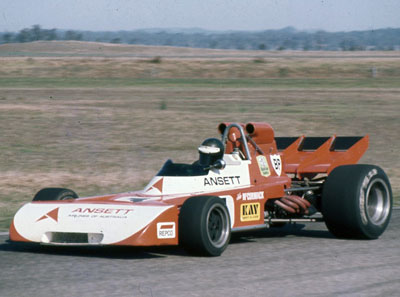

Overview
- Manufacturer: Elfin Cars
- Production: 1971-1972; 4 built
- Designer: Garrie Cooper

Body and chassis
- Class: Formula 5000

Powertrain
- Engine: mid-engine, longitudinally mounted, 4,994 cc (304.8 cu in), Repco Holden, 90° V8, NA mid-engine, longitudinally mounted, 4,942 cc (301.6 cu in), Ford, 90° V8, NA

Chronology
- Predecessor: Elfin Type 100 Mono
- Successor: Elfin MR6

The Elfin MR5 is an Australian Formula 5000 racing car produced from 1971-1972 by Elfin Sports Cars.

Designed by Elfin owner/driver Garrie Cooper, the MR5 was the first car built by Elfin for Formula 5000 racing which had formed the basis of Australia's top open-wheel category, Australian Formula 1, from 1971. A total of four MR5's were built and the cars were powered by Repco-Holden 5.0L V8 or Ford V8 engines.

John McCormack drove an MR5 to victory in the 1973 Australian Drivers' Championship, the 1973 New Zealand Grand Prix, the 1974 New Zealand Grand Prix and the 1974 Lady Wigram Trophy.

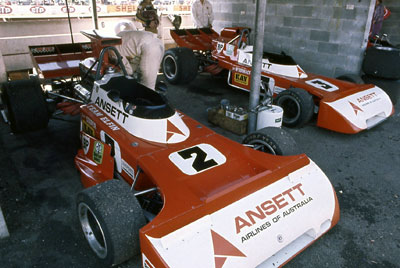
Elfin MR5 at the 1972 Australian Drivers' Championship.
