= Tasman Series =

1964–1975, a motor racing series in Australia and New Zealand

- Category: Tasman Formula; 1964–69 2.5 litre 1970–71 F5000 & 2.5 litre 1972–75 F5000 & 2.0 litre
- Country: Australia; New Zealand
- Inaugural season: 1964
- Folded: 1975
- Drivers: 28 (1975)
- Constructors: 12 (1975)
- Engine suppliers: 3 (1975)
- Last Drivers' champion: (Australia) Warwick Brown

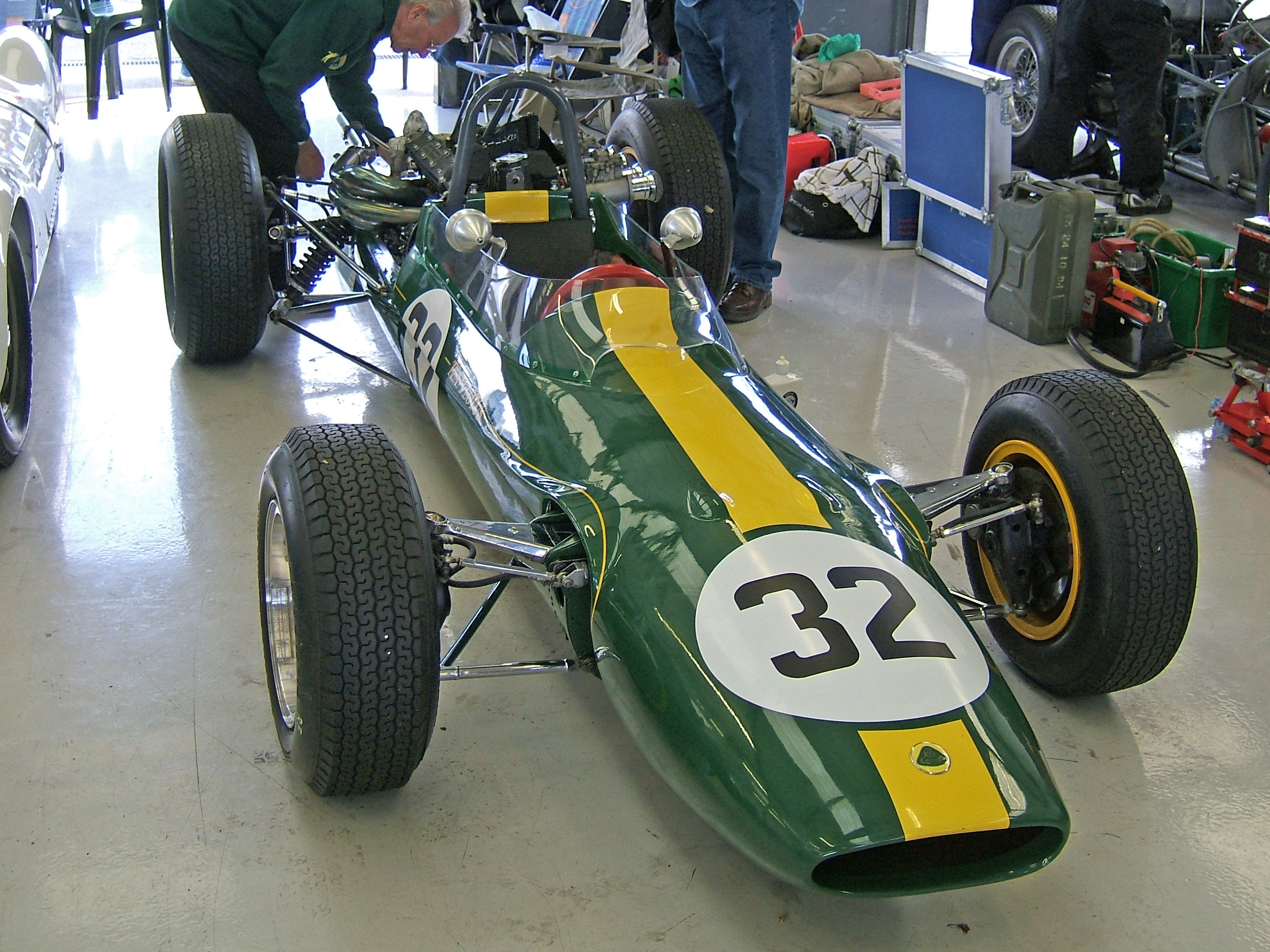
Jim Clark won the 1965 Tasman Series with a Lotus 32B, the Tasman Series variant of the Formula Two Lotus 32, with a 2.5L engine in place of the 32's 1L unit.

The Tasman Series (formally the Tasman Championship for Drivers) was a motor racing competition held annually from 1964 to 1975 over a series of races in New Zealand and Australia. It was named after the Tasman Sea which lies between the two countries. The Tasman Series races were held in January through to late February or early March of each year, during the Formula One off season, taking advantage of winter in the Northern Hemisphere to attract many top drivers to summer in the south. The Tasman Cup was the permanent trophy awarded to the winning driver.

== History ==
The Tasman initially started in 1960 as a series of unrelated races between Australia and New Zealand. In 1964 the official Tasman Championship for Drivers was established. Until 1969, the Tasman Formula specified open-wheel single-seater racing cars similar to Formula One cars, yet retaining F1 engine rules that were in effect until 1960. Thus, engines of 2500 cm³ that were obsolete for the contemporary Formula One class were eligible for the Tasman Formula.

After F1 upgraded to 3000 cm³ in 1966, the Tasman Formula regulations continued to specify a 2500 cm³ limit for another four years. Usually, the chassis of the previous F1 season were fitted with "Tasman" engines, and entered "down under". In what many consider Tasman's zenith season, 1968, Cosworth even produced a Tasman variant of its legendary DFV V8, known as the DFW, and BRM equipped its cars with a reduced capacity version of their F1 V12 while the leading contender local cars were usually equipped with either a Repco-Brabham V8, the older Coventry Climax FPF (made in Australia under licence by Repco) or in the case of Alec Mildren Racing, the Tipo 33 Alfa Romeo V8. In 1969 both Lotus and Ferrari contested the series with two cars teams, Jochen Rindt and Graham Hill in Lotus 49BTs and Chris Amon and Derek Bell in Ferrari Dino 246T cars which used F2 chassis fitted with modernised versions of the late 1950s F1 2.4 Dino V6 engine. Piers Courage strongly challenged the work teams in a Frank Williams Cosworth 2.5 BT24 Brabham which beat the Lotus and Ferrari teams at Teretonga in New Zealand.

Unfortunately for the Tasman Series, F1's "return to power", coupled to ever increasing costs, reduced the cachet of its Antipodean sister and after 1969 teams became increasingly unwilling to invest significant funds into what many perceived as a lesser championship. Only one Cosworth DFW 2.5 powered car appeared in the 1970 and 1971 Tasman series, Bell driving an uncompetitive Goodyear shod Wheatcroft Brabham BT26 in 3 rounds in 1970 and Amon and fellow Kiwi David Oxton each contesting 2 rounds of 1971 series in the ex Andretti March 701.

In an attempt to reduce costs, the Tasman Formula was extended to incorporate Formula 5000 cars from 1970 and the limit on pure racing engines was reduced from 2.5 litres to 2.0 litres from 1972. Even these changes failed to contain spiralling costs and at the end of the 1975 event the series folded.

The four Australian former Tasman races became the Rothmans International Series from 1976 to 1979 (still under Formula 5000 regulations). The four New Zealand races became the 'Peter Stuyvesant Series' and after 1976 changed to Formula Pacific cars.

Many high-profile local drivers from that era, such as Jack Brabham, Bruce McLaren, Chris Amon, Denny Hulme and Frank Gardner took part in their home events, but the series also attracted international F1 stars including Jim Clark, Graham Hill, Phil Hill, John Surtees, Jochen Rindt, Pedro Rodríguez and Jackie Stewart, who travelled the long way from Europe.

For two brief years beginning in 1999 the Tasman Series was revived as a series for Formula Holden racing cars with Simon Wills and Andy Booth winning the two series held exclusively in New Zealand.

The Tasman Series was briefly revived as part of the short-lived S5000 Series.

From 2024, the series was revived for the highest placed antipodean (Australian or New Zealand) in the Formula Regional Oceania Championship.

== Champions ==
Season	Driver	Car	Wins	Podiums	Points	Margin (pts)
Tasman Formula
1964	(New Zealand) Bruce McLaren	Cooper T70-Coventry Climax FPF	3	5 (7)	39	6
1965	(United Kingdom) Jim Clark	Lotus 32B-Coventry Climax FPF	3 (4)	4 (5)	35	11
1966	(United Kingdom) Jackie Stewart	BRM P261	4	5	45	15
1967	(United Kingdom) Jim Clark	Lotus 33-Coventry Climax FWMV	3 (5)	6 (8)	45	27
1968	(United Kingdom) Jim Clark	Lotus 49T-Cosworth DFW	4	5	44	8
1969	(New Zealand) Chris Amon	Ferrari Dino 246T	4	6	44	14
1970	(New Zealand) Graeme Lawrence	Ferrari Dino 246T	1	5	30	5
1971	(New Zealand) Graham McRae	McLaren M10B-Chevrolet	3	5	35	4
1972	(New Zealand) Graham McRae	Leda GM1-Chevrolet	4	4	39	11
1973	(New Zealand) Graham McRae	McRae GM1-Chevrolet	3	5	40	11
1974	(United Kingdom) Peter Gethin	Chevron B24-Chevrolet	2	5	41	15
1975	(Australia) Warwick Brown	Lola T332-Chevrolet	2	4	31	1
Formula Holden
1999	(New Zealand) Simon Wills	Reynard 94D-Holden				
2000	(New Zealand) Andy Booth	Reynard 95D-Holden	2	2	84	2
S5000
2021	(Australia) Aaron Cameron	Rogers AF01-Ford (Note: The chassis is built by Onroak Automotive but the car was built by Garry Rogers Motorsport)	1	3	165	22
2022	(Australia) Nathan Herne	Rogers AF01-Ford	4	4	187	21
2023	(Australia) Aaron Cameron	Rogers AF01-Ford	3	3	130	21
Formula Regional Oceania
2024	(Australia) Christian Mansell	Tatuus FT-60-Toyota	1	4	135	8
2025	(New Zealand) Zack Scoular	Tatuus FT-60-Toyota	1	4	139	30
2026	(New Zealand) Louis Sharp	Tatuus FT-60-Toyota	1	5	295	19

Note: values in parentheses include the results from all races, not all of which counted towards the championship.
