= Graham McRae =

New Zealand racing driver (1940–2021)

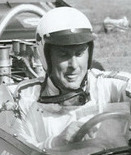
- McRae in 1970
- Born: Graham Peter McRae; 5 March 1940; Wellington, New Zealand
- Died: 4 August 2021 (aged 81); Auckland, New Zealand

Formula One World Championship career
- Nationality: (New Zealand) New Zealander
- Active years: 1973
- Team: Williams
- Entries: 1
- Championships: 0
- Wins: 0
- Podiums: 0
- Career points: 0
- Pole positions: 0
- Fastest laps: 0
- First entry: 1973 British Grand Prix

Graham Peter McRae (5 March 1940 – 4 August 2021) was a racing driver from New Zealand.

McRae achieved considerable success in Formula 5000 racing, winning the Tasman Series each year from 1971 to 1973, and also at the 1972 L&M Continental 5000 Championship in the United States.

McRae's single outing in the Formula One World Championship was at the 1973 British Grand Prix on 14 July 1973, where he retired in the first lap. McRae also competed in the 1973 Indianapolis 500, finishing in 16th position and earning Rookie of the Year.

== Racing career ==
McRae was born in Wellington, New Zealand. As a qualified engineer, McRae competed in local sport car racing and hillclimbs in the early 1960s, notably at Levin and began to compete seriously in the 1.5 twin cam formula, which used an old F3 chassis.

After running a dated Brabham chassis, McRae built a slim, McRae, National Formula car which dominated the 1968–69 series, beating talented opponents in David Oxton, Ken Smith and Bert Hawthorne.

McRae also ran in the four NZ rounds of the Tasman Series, and he proved surprisingly competitive at the tight Levin circuit where McRae, 160 hp down on power qualified 1.8 seconds slower than Jochen Rindt and almost equalled the time of GLTL Team Leader Graham Hill in a mishandling Lotus 49. This performance secured McRae the NZ Driver to Europe scholarship for a few 1969 F2 races where he ran in the upper midfield in an ageing Brabham BT23.

Before entering Formula One, McRae placed third in both the 1970 Guards European Formula 5000 Championship and first in the 1971 Rothmans European Formula 5000 Championship. He won a number of rounds, but was hindered by some accidents, one serious, and impatience which earned him the nickname, 'Cassius' (after the boxing champion) reflecting his strut and belief in the greatness of his own talent.

Fields were strong in European F5000 at this time and McRae was competing against former F1 drivers Brian Redman, Trevor Taylor, Mike Hailwood and Frank Gardner, all world class drivers and Peter Gethin and Howden Ganley in works backed McLarens. McRae was Tasman Series Champion three years in a row, from 1971 to 1973, also taking the US F5000 Championship crown in 1972, with three race wins. The US 5000 championship win in 1972 was a noted achievement against competent F5000 and World Championship sports car drivers David Hobbs and Sam Posey and McRae won a lot of money and laurels, and drove with control despite also competing in the 1972 Rothmans European Formula 5000 Championship, in which he placed third.

In the combined F1/F5000 International Trophy, McRae finished seventh, the first F5000 car and for a while had run ahead of Graham Hill in an F1 Brabham BT34 and kept up with the F1 McLarens of Denny Hulme and Peter Revson. He was offered a drive in F1 at Nivelles when Jackie Stewart suffered an ulcer, but could not fit it into his programme. He did race for Frank Williams in the British GP the following year but it was an uncompetitive chassis.

In 1973, McRae faced much stronger competition in US F5000 with F1 drivers James Hunt and Jody Scheckter having far better financed efforts and more support. McRae also contested the 1973 Rothmans 5000 European Championship, but recorded only one round win, at Mallory Park. 1974 was McRae's last good year and despite lack of finance and contractual disputes over his new McRae GM2 and its Talon derivative, McRae finished eighth in the US F5000 series and would have been fifth if he had not lost third place with tyre failure at Las Vegas, where he was running ahead of Unser.

After writing off the GM2 in practice for the Oran Park, the Tasman round at the start of 1975, McRae contested the US F5000 National Travellers Cheque series, in a Lola T332 which showed promise in the heats, finishing fourth behind J.P Jarier at Watkins Glen and second in a heat at Laguna Seca to Al Unser, ahead of Warwick Brown and qualifying eighth at Long Beach, but never finished better than eighth in the main race during the series. McRae debuted his new GM3 at the last US F5000 race in Riverside in 1976, and retired from midfield.

The car featured Perspex windows in the cockpit (like the Tyrrell P34), so the spectators could watch McRae at the wheel. But with the US F5000 regulations being changed to require the cars to carry Can Am sports car bodies, McRae took a year to revise the GM3 and unsponsored he could not pay for competitive engines, and privateer competition against the Haas or Paul Newman teams was hopeless. In 1978, he won his fifth F5000 title, the Australian Drivers' Championship.

== Death ==
McRae died on 4 August 2021 at the age of 81, following some years of illness.

== McRae Cars ==
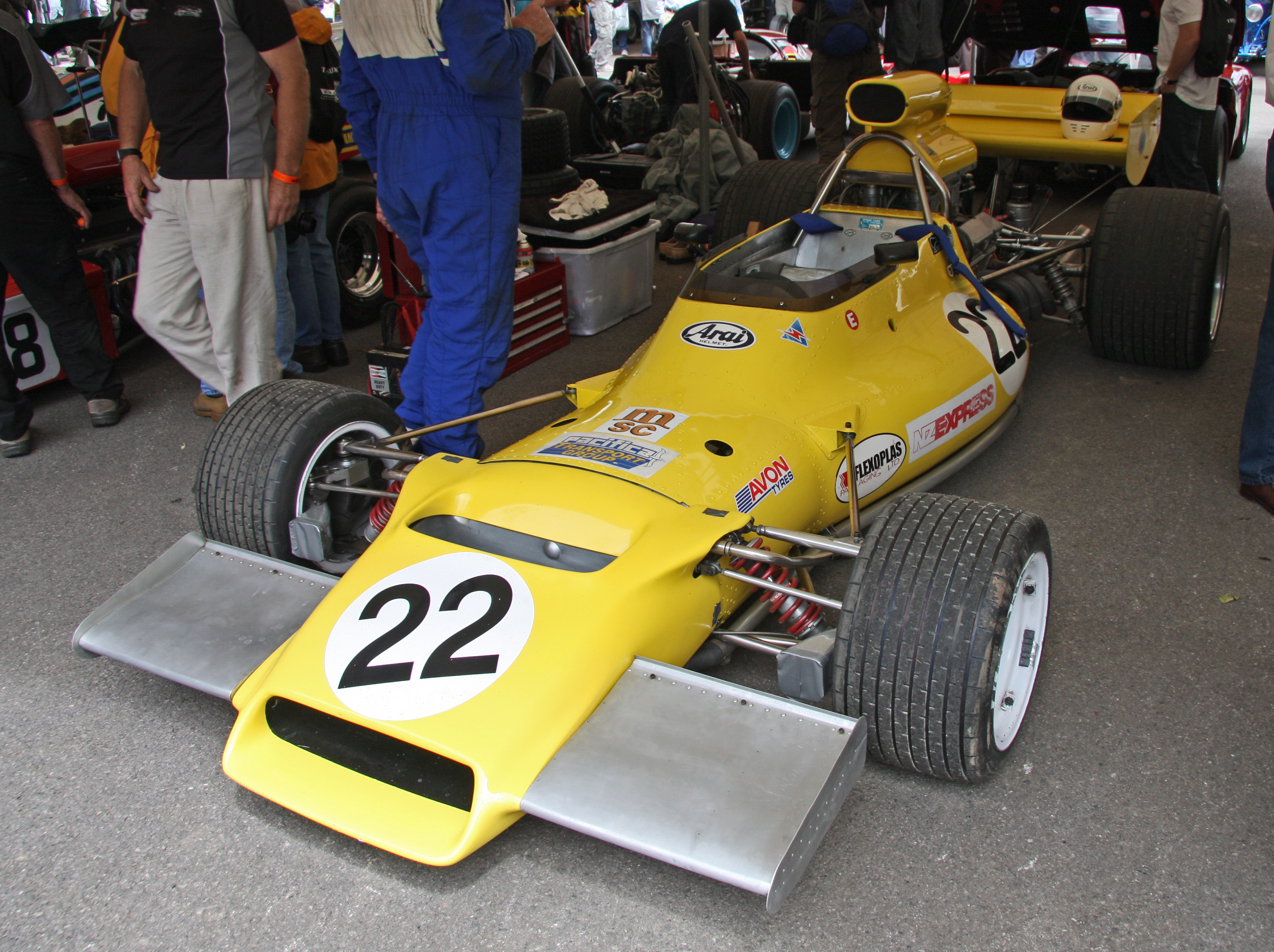
McRae GM1

In 1972, McRae, Malcolm Bridgland of Malaya Garage, and car designer Len Terry built a new F5000. The car was initially designated the Leda LT27 following Terry's designs. McRae used the name Leda GM1 for his personal car. In mid-1972, McRae and London insurance broker John Heynes bought out Bridgland and set up a United Kingdom company McRae Cars Ltd at Poole, Dorset. As from 1 July 1972, the Leda was renamed the McRae GM1. Fourteen of these cars were built between 1972 and 1973. It achieved considerable success in the British Hill Climb Championship, driven by Roy Lane.

A one-off McRae GM2 was built in 1973 and the design was subsequently sold to Jack McCormack who built five examples under the name Talon. A single GM3 followed in 1976 and this was later developed into the GM9 Can-Am car.

McRae followed this up in 1993 with a replica of the Porsche 356 Speedster. It was based around a 2.0-litre Porsche 914 with a five-speed gearbox. McRae had imported a Porsche 356 Speedster from Vintage Speedsters of California to make the moulds for his production kits. Being a technical perfectionist, McRae's Spyder is an accurate replica of original built by Porsche in 1954 and 1955. Some McRae Spyders are powered by a Subaru engine. In June 2000, McRae set up the New Zealand based McRae Cars Ltd. Since his illness in 2003, no more of these cars have been made and the existing 38 models are in high demand. The company was struck off the register in June 2003.

Former McRae GM1 owner and driver, Alister Hey of Queenstown registered McRae Cars Limited again in 2010.

== Indianapolis 500 results ==
Year	Car	Start	Qual	Rank	Finish	Laps	Led	Retired
1973	60	13	192.030	15	16	91	0	Header
Totals						91	0	

Starts	1
Poles	0
Front row	0
Wins	0
Top 5	0
Top 10	0
Retired	1

== Complete Formula One World Championship results ==
(key)

Year	Entrant	Chassis	Engine	1	2	3	4	5	6	7	8	9	10	11	12	13	14	15	WDC	Points
1973	Frank Williams Racing Cars	Iso-Marlboro IR	Cosworth V8	ARG	BRA	RSA	ESP	BEL	MON	SWE	FRA	GBR; Ret	NED	GER	AUT	ITA	CAN	USA	NC	0

== Complete Formula One non-championship results ==
(key)

Year	Entrant	Chassis	Engine	1	2	3	4	5	6	7	8
1969	Graham McRae	Brabham BT23C F2	Cosworth L4	ROC	INT	MAD; DNA	OUL				
1970	Graham McRae	McLaren M10B F5000	Chevrolet V8	ROC	INT; Ret	OUL; DNS					
1971	Graham McRae	McLaren M10B F5000	Chevrolet V8	ARG	ROC	QUE	SPR	INT	RIN	OUL; 9	VIC
1972	Crown Lynn Potteries	McRae GM1 F5000	Chevrolet V8	ROC; DNS	BRA	INT; 8	OUL	REP	VIC; 12		
1973	Graham McRae Racing	McRae GM1 F5000	Chevrolet V8	ROC; Ret	INT; Ret						

== General references ==
- Profile at Grandprix.com

Sporting positions
Preceded by Graeme Lawrence	Tasman Series; Champion; 1971-1973	Succeeded by Peter Gethin
Preceded by Frank Matich	Australian Grand Prix; Winner; 1972 and 1973	Succeeded by Max Stewart
Preceded by Mike Hiss	Indianapolis 500; Rookie of the Year; 1973	Succeeded by Pancho Carter
Preceded by Warwick Brown	Australian Grand Prix; Winner; 1978	Succeeded by Johnnie Walker
Preceded by John McCormack	Australian Drivers' Championship; Champion; 1978	Succeeded by Johnnie Walker
