= Warwick Farm Raceway =

Race track in Warwick Farm, New South Wales

The Farm
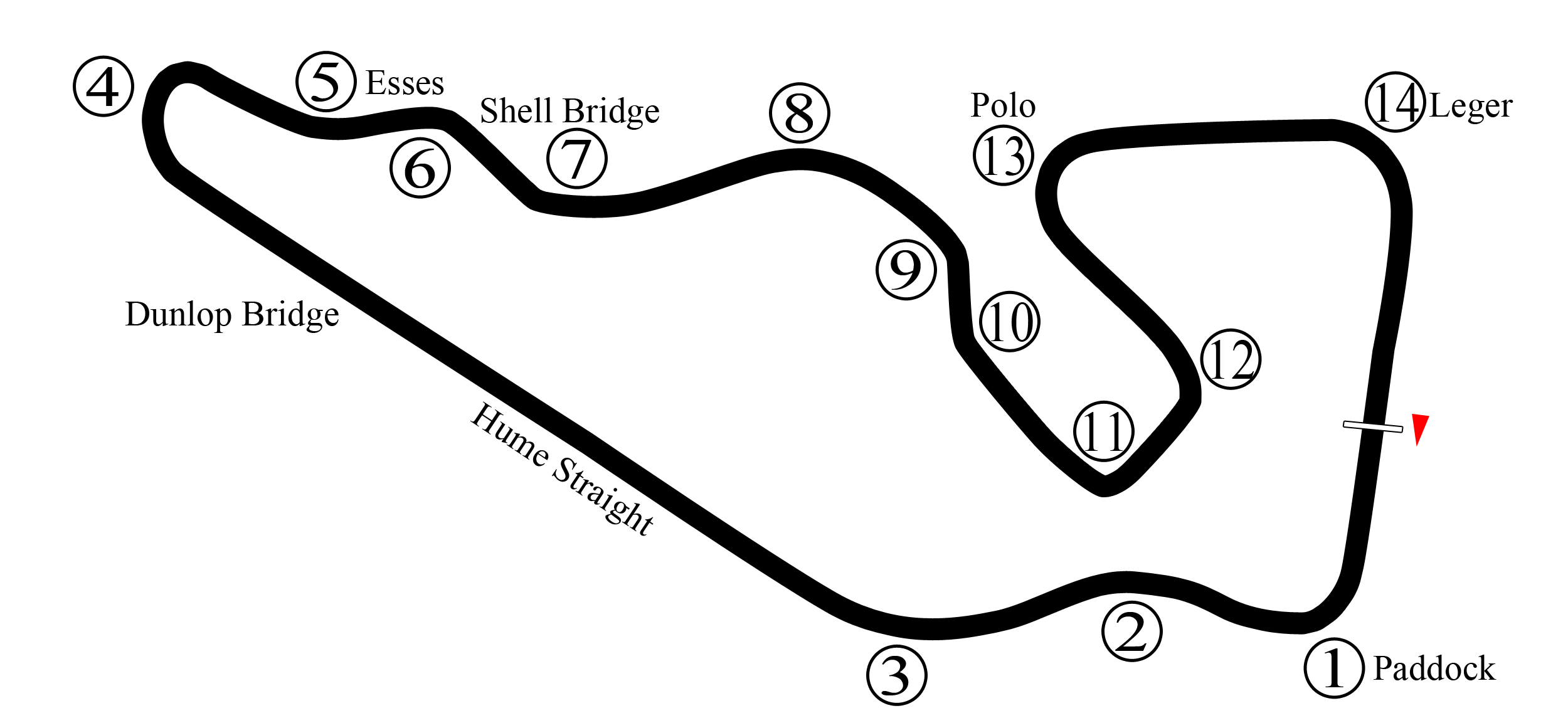
- Grand Prix Circuit (1960–1973)
- Location: Warwick Farm, New South Wales
- Coordinates: 33°54′39″S 150°56′42″E
- Owner: Australian Jockey Club (December 1960–August 1973)
- Operator: Australian Automobile Racing Company (December 1960–August 1973)
- Broke ground: 1960
- Opened: December 1960; 64 years ago
- Closed: August 1973; 52 years ago
- Major events: Australian Grand Prix (1963, 1967, 1970–1971); Tasman Series (1964–1973); Australian Drivers' Championship (1963–1970, 1972); Australian Sports Car Championship (1969–1972); Australian Touring Car Championship (1968, 1970, 1972–1973); Australian GT (1961)

Grand Prix Circuit (1960–1973)
- Length: 3.621 km (2.250 mi)
- Turns: 14
- Race lap record: 1:24.0 ( (Australia) Frank Gardner, Lola T300, 1972, Formula 5000)

Warwick Farm Raceway was a motor racing facility which was in operation from 1960 to 1973. Warwick Farm Raceway hosted numerous major events during its life such as the Australian Grand Prix and rounds of both the Australian Touring Car Championship and the Tasman Series.

== History ==
Warwick Farm Raceway was built in 1960 on the site of the Warwick Farm Racecourse, a horse racing track with which it was to co-exist throughout its history. When a motor racing meeting was scheduled, two "crossings" had to be placed over the top of the horse racing track, and then removed after racing had finished. The first, known as the Western Crossing, came between turns two and three while the second called the Northern Crossing was located later in the lap between turns 8 and 9.

Known as either The Farm or simply Warwick Farm, the circuit became one of Australia's premier motor racing venues and gained a reputation as a "drivers' track", hosting the Australian Grand Prix and rounds of both the Tasman Series, both of which attracted the top Formula One drivers of the day including World Champions Graham Hill, Jim Clark, Jackie Stewart, Jochen Rindt, John Surtees, and Denny Hulme, plus Bruce McLaren, Chris Amon, Piers Courage, Derek Bell and Sydney's own World Drivers' Champion Jack Brabham. The Farm also hosted rounds of the Australian Drivers' Championship which saw the local stars such as Frank Matich, Frank Gardner, Kevin Bartlett, Max Stewart and Leo Geoghegan battling it out. It also staged Australian Touring Car Championship races during its later years which saw top line racing from the likes of Allan Moffat, Pete Geoghegan, Bob Jane and Norm Beechey, with the last major race at Warwick Farm being the final round of the 1973 Australian Touring Car Championship on 15 July (won by Peter Brock) and the final race meeting was a club day held in August 1973.

The reason for the closure was financial - the Confederation of Australian Motorsport (CAMS) wanted to have armco fencing installed around the circuit, and the AJC (Australian Jockey Club) wasn't willing to spend the money to upgrade the circuit.

Warwick Farm held its first meeting in December 1960. On a wet track, Ian "Pete" Geoghegan won the opening touring car race driving a Jaguar 3.4 Litre.

When it closed as a motor racing facility in 1973, the lap record of the 3.621 km (2.250 mi) long Warwick Farm circuit was held by Australian motor racing legend Frank Gardner. Driving a Chevrolet powered Lola T300 Formula 5000 during the 1972 Tasman Series, Gardner set a time of 1:24.0 during the Warwick Farm 100. Gardner finished second in the race he had won in 1971, 18 seconds behind Frank Matich driving his self-designed and built Matich A50 Repco-Holden.

== Australian Grand Prix ==
Warwick Farm Raceway hosted the Australian Grand Prix a total of four times:

Year	Driver	Car	Entrant
1963	Jack Brabham	Brabham BT4 Coventry Climax	Ecurie Vitesse
1967	Jackie Stewart	BRM P261 V8	R.H.H. Parnell
1970	Frank Matich	McLaren M10B Repco-Holden	Rothmans Team Matich
1971	Frank Matich	Matich A50 Repco-Holden	Rothmans Team Matich

== International 100 ==
Warwick Farm hosted the annual International 100 from 1961 to 1973:

Year	Driver	Car	Entrant
1961	Stirling Moss	Lotus 18 Coventry Climax FPF	RRC Walker
1962	Stirling Moss	Cooper T53 Coventry Climax FPF	RRC Walker Racing Team
1963 to 1973	Refer Australian Grand Prix (1963 & 1967, above) & Tasman Series (below)		

== Australian Touring Car Championship ==
Warwick Farm Raceway hosted the single race Australian Touring Car Championship in 1968, and hosted rounds of the championship in 1970, 1972 and 1973.

Year	Driver	Car	Entrant
Group C Improved Production
1968	(Australia) Ian Geoghegan	Ford Mustang GTA	The Mustang Team
1970	(Australia) Jim McKeown	Porsche 911S	Jim McKeown Shell Racing Team
1972	(Australia) Bob Jane	Chevrolet Camaro ZL-1	Bob Jane Racing
Group C
1973	(Australia) Peter Brock	Holden LJ Torana GTR XU-1	Holden Dealer Team

== Tasman Series ==
Warwick Farm Raceway hosted a round of the Tasman Series each year from 1964 to 1973.

Year	Race name	Driver	Car	Entrant
1964	Warwick Farm International	(Australia) Jack Brabham	Brabham BT7A Coventry Climax FPF	Ecurie Vitesse
1965	Warwick Farm International	(United Kingdom) Jim Clark	Lotus 32B Coventry Climax FPF	Team Lotus
1966	Warwick Farm International	(United Kingdom) Jim Clark	Lotus 39 Coventry Climax FPF	Team Lotus
1967	Australian Grand Prix	(United Kingdom) Jackie Stewart	BRM P261 V8	R.H.H. Parnell
1968	Warwick Farm International	(United Kingdom) Jim Clark	Lotus 49T Cosworth DFW	Team Lotus
1969	Warwick Farm International	(Austria) Jochen Rindt	Lotus 49T Cosworth DFW	World Wide Racing
1970	Warwick Farm 100	(Australia) Kevin Bartlett	Mildren Waggott TC4V	Alec Mildren Racing
1971	Warwick Farm 100	(Australia) Frank Gardner	Lola T192 Chevrolet	Lola Cars Ltd
1972	Rothmans 100	(Australia) Frank Matich	Matich A50 Repco-Holden	Frank Matich Racing Pty Ltd
1973	Chesterfield 100	(United Kingdom) Steve Thompson	Chevron B24 Chevrolet	Servis Racing Team

== Australian Drivers' Championship ==
Warwick Farm Raceway hosted a round of the Australian Drivers' Championship on 11 occasions. The Hordern Trophy race was named for Sir Samuel Hordern, a businessman who was sent by the AJC (Australian Jockey Club) to investigate how the British venue at Aintree combined car and horse racing.

Year	Race name	Driver	Car	Entrant
1963	Australian Grand Prix	(Australia) Jack Brabham	Repco Brabham BT4 Coventry Climax FPF	Ecurie Vitesse
1963	Hordern Trophy	(Australia) John Youl	Cooper T55 Coventry Climax FPF	John Youl
1964	Hordern Trophy	(Australia) Leo Geoghegan	Lotus 32 Ford	Total Team
1965	International 100	(United Kingdom) Jim Clark	Lotus 32B Coventry Climax FPF	Team Lotus
1965	Hordern Trophy	(Australia) Bib Stillwell	Repco Brabham BT11A Coventry Climax FPF	BS Stillwell
1966	Hordern Trophy	(Australia) Frank Gardner	Repco Brabham BT16 Coventry Climax FPF	Alec Mildren Racing
1967	Hordern Trophy	(Australia) Frank Gardner	Brabham BT23D Alfa Romeo	Alec Mildren Racing
1968	Hordern Trophy	(Australia) Kevin Bartlett	Brabham BT23D Alfa Romeo	Alec Mildren Racing
1969	Hordern Trophy	(Australia) Kevin Bartlett	Mildren Mono Waggott TC4V	Alec Mildren Racing
1970	Hordern Trophy	(Australia) Leo Geoghegan	Lotus 59B Waggott TC4V	Geoghegan's Sporty Cars
1972	Hordern Trophy	(Australia) Frank Matich	Matich A50 Repco-Holden	Frank Matich Racing

== Australian Sports Car Championship ==
Warwick Farm hosted a round of the Australian Sports Car Championship each year from 1969 to 1972.

- 1969 RAC Trophy – Frank Matich – Matich SR4 Repco
- 1970 RAC Trophy – Neil Allen – Elfin ME5 Chevrolet
- 1971 RAC Trophy – John Harvey – McLaren M6 Repco
- 1972 RAC Trophy – John Harvey – McLaren M6 Repco

== Australian Manufacturers' Championship ==
Warwick Farm hosted a round of the Australian Manufacturers' Championship in 1971.

- 1971 – Castrol Trophy – Colin Bond – Holden LC Torana GTR XU-1

== Australian Formula Junior Championship ==
Warwick Farm hosted the Australian Formula Junior Championship in 1963.

- 1963 – Leo Geoghegan – Lotus 22 Ford

== Australian GT Championship ==
Warwick Farm hosted the Australian GT Championship in 1962.

- 1962 – Frank Matich – Jaguar D-Type

== London to Sydney Marathon rally - 1968 ==
Warwick Farm was the venue for the finish of the London-Sydney Marathon. First place went to the Hillman Hunter crewed by Andrew Cowan, Colin Malkin and Brian Coyle.
