= 1965 Australian Drivers' Championship =

Motor racing competition

Seasons
- ← 1964 1966 →

The 1965 Australian Drivers' Championship was a CAMS sanctioned Australian national motor racing title open to racing cars complying with the Australian National Formula or the Australian 1½ Litre Formula. The title was contested over a six race series with the winner awarded the 1965 CAMS Gold Star. It was the ninth Australian Drivers' Championship.

The championship was won by Victorian racer Bib Stillwell driving a Repco Brabham BT11A-Coventry Climax. Stillwell won by 19 points from Jack Brabham (Repco Brabham BT11A-Coventry Climax). Three drivers shared third place, Spencer Martin (Repco Brabham BT11A-Coventry Climax), Leo Geoghegan (Lotus 32-Ford) and John McDonald (Cooper T53-Coventry Climax and Cooper T70-Coventry Climax).

Stillwell won three of the six races with the remaining race wins attained by Jim Clark (Lotus 32B-Coventry Climax), Bruce McLaren (Cooper T79-Coventry Climax) and Martin.

== Calendar ==
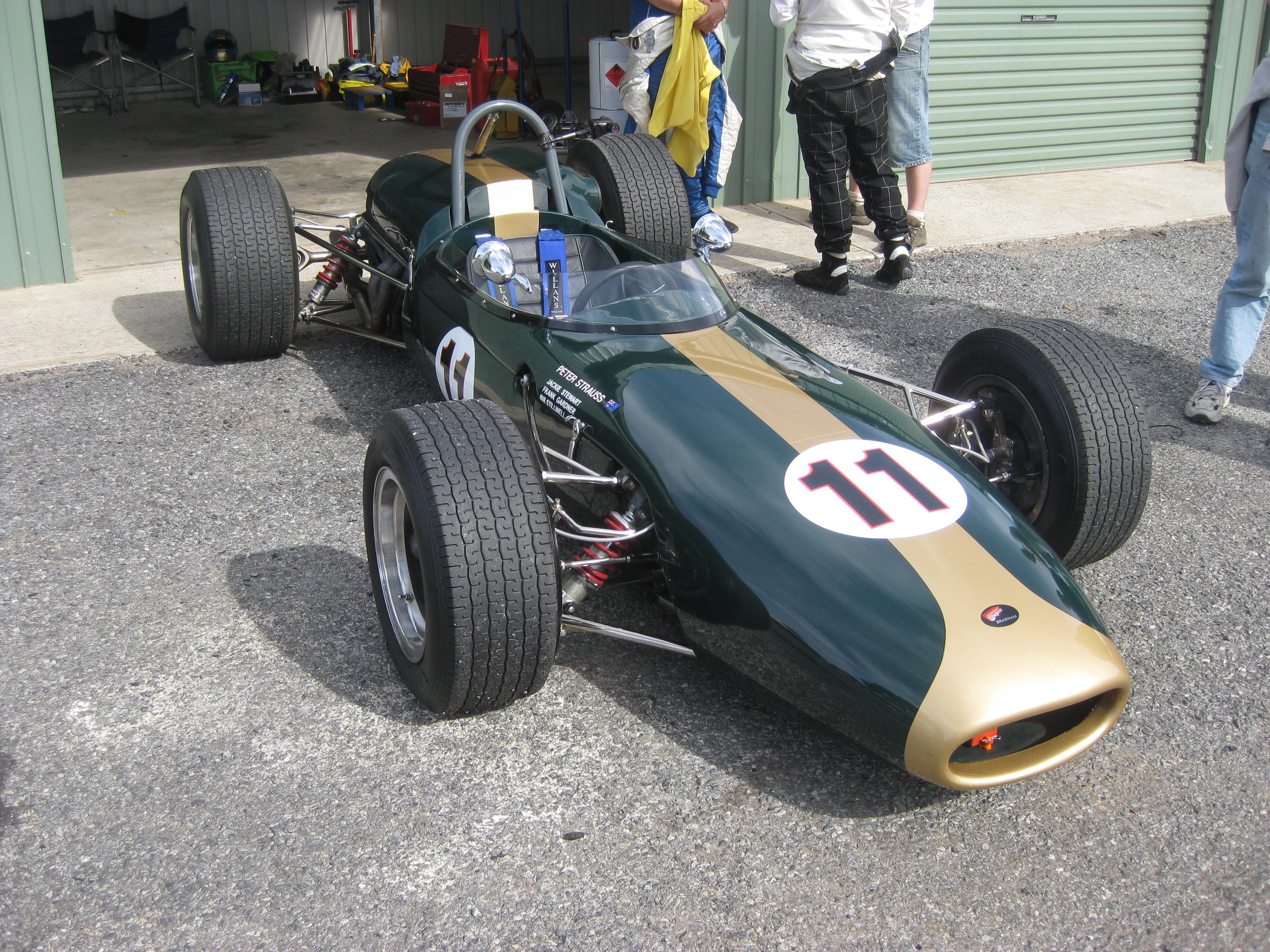
The Repco Brabham BT11A with which Bib Stillwell won the 1965 championship. The car is pictured in 2012.

The championship was contested over a six race series.

Race	Circuit	Date	Race winner	Car
International 100	Warwick Farm	14 February	Jim Clark	Lotus 32B Coventry Climax
Australian Grand Prix	Longford	1 March	Bruce McLaren	Cooper T79 Coventry Climax
Victorian Road Racing Championship	Sandown Park	11 April	Bib Stillwell	Repco Brabham BT11A Coventry Climax
Governor's Trophy	Lakeside	25 July	Spencer Martin	Repco Brabham BT11A Coventry Climax
Country Club Gold Star Championship Race	Mallala	11 October	Bib Stillwell	Repco Brabham BT11A Coventry Climax
Hordern Trophy	Warwick Farm	5 December	Bib Stillwell	Repco Brabham BT11A Coventry Climax

The International 100 and the Australian Grand Prix were also rounds of the 1965 Tasman Series.

== Points system ==
Championship points were awarded on a 9-6-4-3-2-1 basis to the first six placegetters, however only holders of a current and valid full General Competition Licence issued by CAMS were eligible. The title was awarded to the driver gaining the highest points total in the Australian Grand Prix and any four of the other races.

== Results ==
Position	Driver	Car	Entrant	War.	Lon.	San.	Lak.	Mal.	War.	Total
1	Bib Stillwell	Repco Brabham BT11A Coventry Climax	BS Stillwell	4	6	9	-	9	9	37
2	Jack Brabham	Repco Brabham BT11A Coventry Climax	Ecurie Vitesse	9	9	-	-	-	-	18
3	Spencer Martin	Repco Brabham BT11A Coventry Climax	Scuderia Veloce	-	-	-	9	6	-	15
=	Leo Geoghegan	Lotus 32 Ford	Total Team	3	-	-	6	-	6	15
=	John McDonald	Cooper T70 Coventry Climax	Bill Patterson Motors	-	3	4	4	-	4	15
6	Frank Matich	Repco Brabham BT7A Coventry Climax	Total Team	6	-	6	-	-	-	12
7	John Ampt	Alexis Mk6 Ford	John Ampt	-	-	3	3	-	-	6
8	Glyn Scott	Lotus 27 Ford	Glyn Scott Motors	-	4	-	-	-	1	5
9	Garrie Cooper	Elfin Mono Mk1 Ford	Elfin Sports Cars	-	-	-	-	4	-	4
10	John Walker	Elfin Catalina Ford	Gilbert Motor Bodies	-	-	-	-	3	-	3
=	John Harvey	Repco Brabham BT14 Ford	RC Phillips	-	-	-	-	-	3	3
=	Mel McEwin	Elfin Mono Ford	Mel McEwin	-	1	2	-	-	-	3
13	Rocky Tresise	Cooper T62 Coventry Climax	Ecurie Australie	2	-	-	-	-	-	2
=	Jack Hobden	Cooper T51 Coventry Climax	Lewis Hobden Pty Ltd	-	2	-	-	-	-	2
=	Barry Collerson	Repco Brabham BT2 Ford	Hunter & Delbridge	-	-	-	2	-	-	2
=	Noel Potts	Elfin Catalina Ford	Noel Potts	-	-	-	-	2	-	2
17	Bob Jane	Elfin Mono Mk1 Ford	Bob Jane Autoland	-	-	-	-	-	2	2
=	Greg Cusack	Repco Brabham BT10 Ford	Greg Cusack	1	-	-	-	-	-	1
19	Don Fraser	Cooper T53 BRM	Don Fraser	-	-	1	-	-	-	1
=	Jimmy Orr	Austin Special	Jimmy Orr	-	-	-	-	1	-	1

- Jim Clark won the International 100 at Warwick Farm but Jack Brabham was awarded maximum points as the highest placed CAMS license holder.
- Bruce McLaren won the Australian Grand Prix at Longford but Jack Brabham was awarded maximum points as the highest placed CAMS license holder.
