= 1963 Australian Grand Prix =

- Race 1 of 6 in 1963 Australian Drivers' Championship
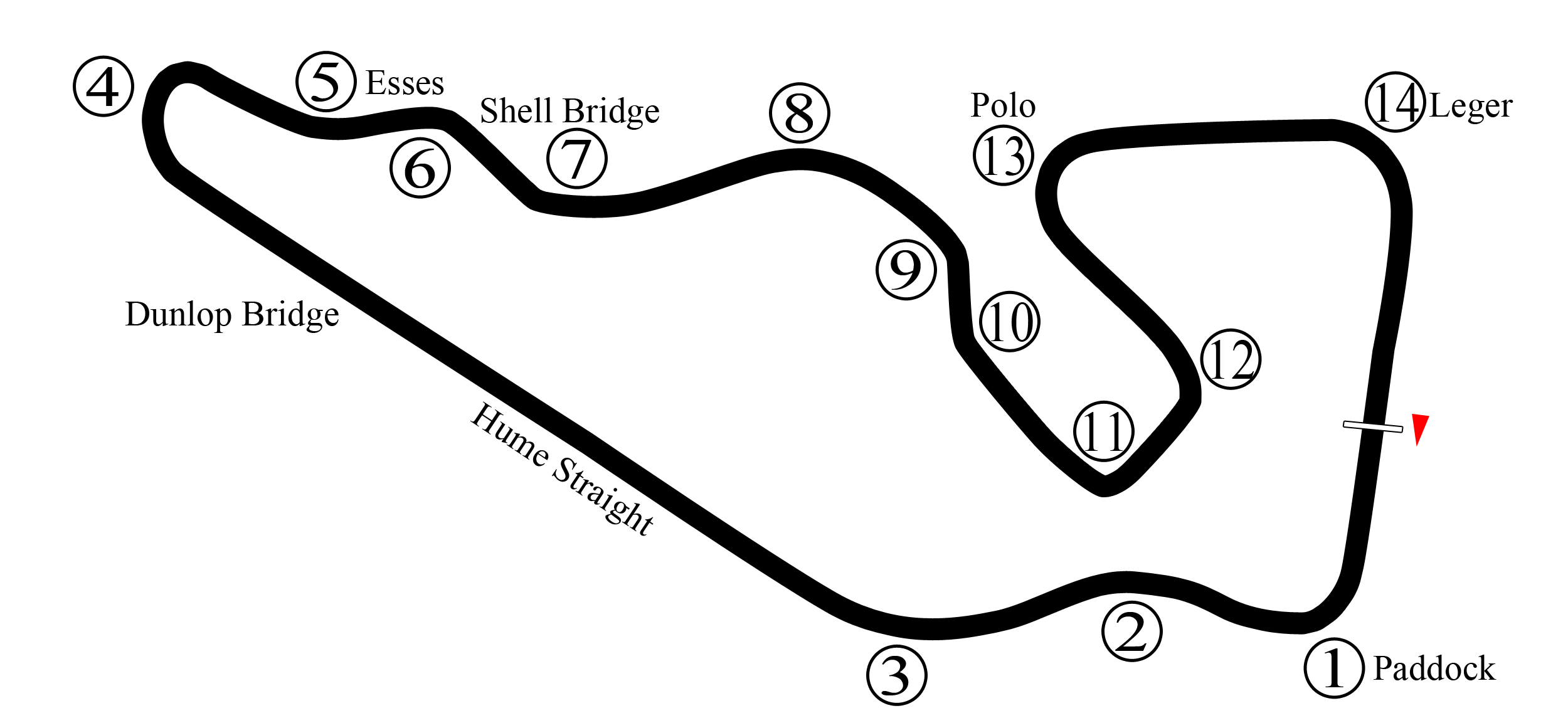

Race details
- Date: 10 February 1963
- Location: Warwick Farm Raceway, Sydney, New South Wales, Australia
- Course: Permanent racing facility
- Course length: 3.621 km (2.25 miles)
- Distance: 45 laps, 162.945 km (101.25 miles)
- Weather: Hot and sunny

Pole position
| Driver | (New Zealand) Bruce McLaren | Cooper-Climax |
- Time: 1'38.8

Fastest lap
| Driver | (United Kingdom) John Surtees; Jack Brabham | Lola-Climax; Repco Brabham-Climax |
- Time: 1'40.2

Podium
| First | (Australia) Jack Brabham | Repco Brabham-Climax |
| Second | (United Kingdom) John Surtees | Lola-Climax |
| Third | (New Zealand) Bruce McLaren | Cooper-Climax |

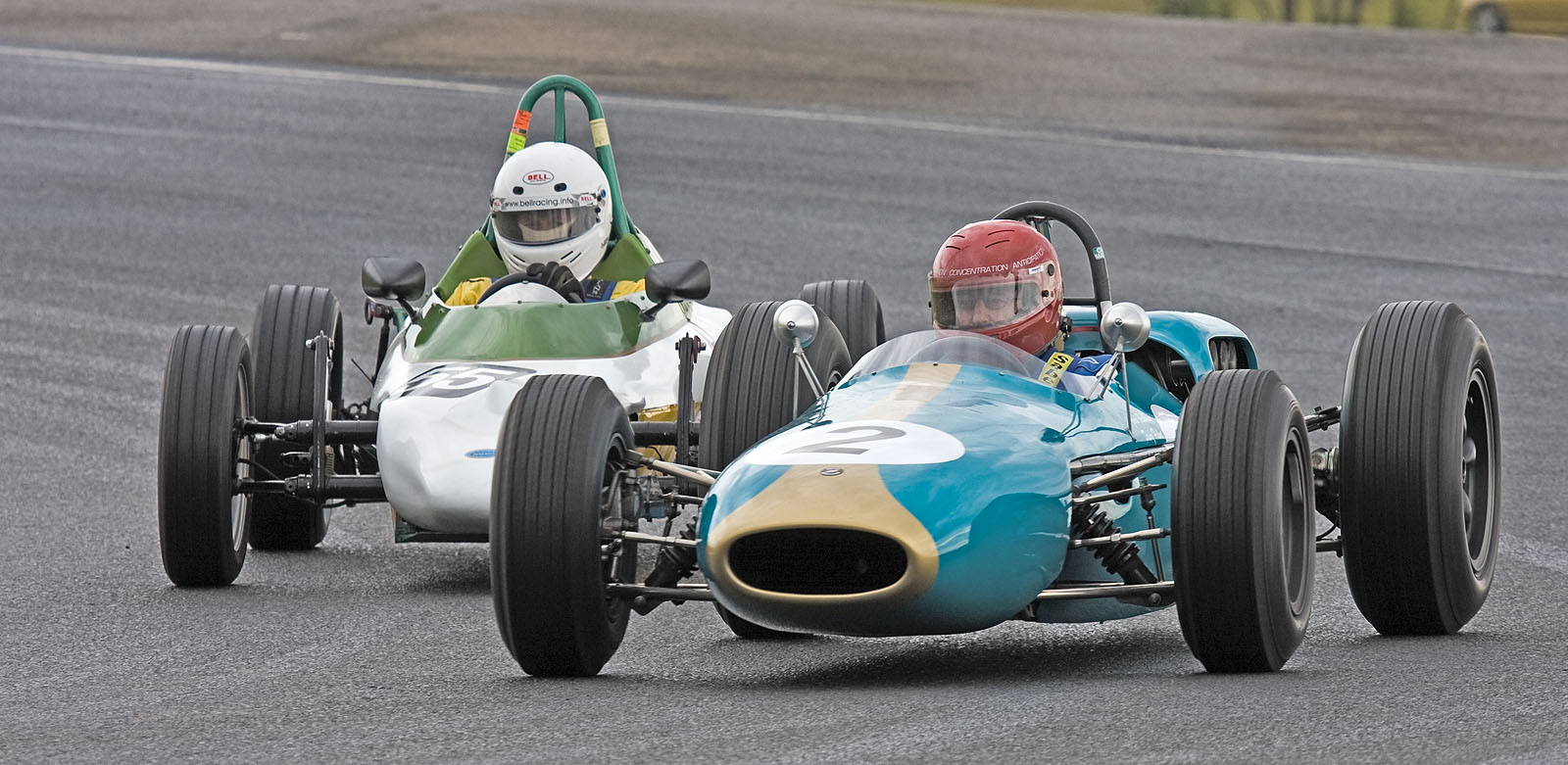
Jack Brabham won the race driving a Repco Brabham BT4, similar to the example pictured above

The 1963 Australian Grand Prix was a motor race held at Warwick Farm Raceway in New South Wales, Australia on 10 February 1963. Open to Formula Libre cars, it was the opening heat of the 1963 Australian Drivers' Championship. The race, which was the twenty eighth Australian Grand Prix, had 16 starters.

The race featured a strong representation of international competitors, with entries from Ecurie Vitesse for Jack Brabham, Bruce McLaren for himself, R.R.C. Walker Racing Team for Graham Hill and from the Bowmaker Racing Team for John Surtees, Tony Maggs and Jim Palmer. Jack Brabham won the race, his second Australian Grand Prix victory, after a battle with John Surtees. It was the first AGP victory by a driver in a self-developed car since Doug Whiteford won in his "Black Bess" Ford V8 Special in 1950.

Stirling Moss, who was recovering from a near-fatal crash at the Goodwood Circuit, was the special guest at the Grand Prix. Moss, who had driven a Maserati 250F to victory in the 1956 Australian Grand Prix at the Albert Park Grand Prix Circuit in Melbourne, also provided guest commentary for Australian television station the ABC alongside Doug Woodward, Bill Reynolds and pit reporter Norman May.

== Classification ==
Results as follows.

| Pos | No. | Driver | Entrant | Car | Laps | Time / Reason |
|---|---|---|---|---|---|---|
| 1 | 4 | (Australia) Jack Brabham | Ecurie Vitesse | Repco Brabham BT4 / Climax FPF 2.7L | 45 | 1h 16m 34.1s |
| 2 | 2 | (United Kingdom) John Surtees | Bowmaker Racing Team | Lola Mk.4 / Climax FPF 2.7L | 45 | 1h 16m 42.1s |
| 3 | 10 | (New Zealand) Bruce McLaren | B. McLaren | Cooper T62 / Climax FPF 2.7L | 45 | 1h 17m 284.1s |
| 4 | 5 | (Australia) David McKay | Scuderia Veloce | Repco Brabham BT4 / Climax FPF 2.7L | 45 | 1h 18m 01.1s |
| 5 | 6 | (Australia) Bib Stillwell | B.S. Stillwell | Repco Brabham BT4 / Climax FPF 2.7L | 44 | |
| 6 | 1 | (United Kingdom) Graham Hill | R.R.C. Walker Racing Team | Ferguson P99 / Climax FPF 2.5L | 44 | |
| 7 | 16 | (New Zealand) Tony Shelly | Independent Motors | Lotus 18/21 / Climax FPF 2.5L | 44 | |
| 8 | 18 | (Australia) Frank Matich | Total Team | Elfin Catalina / Ford 1.5L | 43 | |
| 9 | 17 | (Australia) Leo Geoghegan | Total Team | Lotus 20B / Ford 1.5L | 42 | |
| 10 | 19 | (Australia) Bob Holden | Killara Motor Garage | Lynx / Peugeot 1.5L | 42 | |
| 11 | 8 | (Australia) Lex Davison | Ecurie Australie | Cooper T53 / Climax FPF 2.7L | 36 | |
| Ret | 3 | (South Africa) Tony Maggs | Bowmaker Racing Team | Lola Mk.4 / Climax FPF 2.7L | 31 | Exhaustion |
| Ret | 15 | (Australia) John Youl | J. Youl | Cooper T55 / Climax FPF 2.5L | 25 | Black Flagged |
| Ret | 14 | (New Zealand) Chris Amon | Scuderia Veloce | Cooper T53 / Climax FPF 2.5L | 24 | Fuel Pump |
| Ret | 12 | (New Zealand) Jim Palmer | Bowmaker Racing Team | Cooper T55 / Climax FPF 2.7L | 9 | Broken steering arm |
| Ret | 11 | (Australia) Frank Gardner | Alec Mildren Pty. Ltd. | Cooper T51 / Maserati 2.9L | 0 | Broken Axle |

== Notes ==
- Pole position: Bruce McLaren - 1'38.8
- Fastest lap: John Surtees and Jack Brabham - 1'40.2 (80.84 m.p.h.) (130.074 k.p.h.)
- Winner's average speed: 79.57 m.p.h. (128.05 k.p.h)

| Preceded by 1962 Australian Grand Prix | Australian Grand Prix; 1963 | Succeeded by 1964 Australian Grand Prix |
