= 1964 Australian Drivers' Championship =

Motor racing competition

Seasons
- ← 1963 1965 →

The 1964 Australian Drivers' Championship was an Australian motor racing competition for Racing Cars complying with either the Australian National Formula or with the Australian 1½ Litre Formula. The winning driver was awarded the CAMS Gold Star and the title of Australian Champion Driver. It was the eight Australian Drivers' Championship to be awarded by the Confederation of Australian Motor Sport.

The championship was won by Bib Stillwell driving a Repco Brabham BT4 Climax.

== Schedule ==
The championship was contested over five races.

Race	Race name	Circuit	State	Date	Winning driver	Car
1	Australian Grand Prix	Sandown	Victoria	9 February	Jack Brabham	Repco Brabham BT7A Climax
2	South Pacific Gold Star Championship	Longford	Tasmania	2 March	Graham Hill	Repco Brabham BT4 Climax
3	Governor's Trophy	Lakeside	Queensland	13 September	Bib Stillwell	Repco Brabham BT4 Climax
4	Craven Filter Trophy	Mallala Race Circuit	South Australia	12 October	Lex Davison	Repco Brabham BT4 Climax
5	Horden Trophy	Warwick Farm	New South Wales	6 December	Leo Geoghegan	Lotus 32 Ford

== Points system ==
Points were awarded on a 9-6-4-3-2-1 basis to the top six place-getters in each race. Only drivers holding a General Competition License issued by CAMS were eligible.

== Championship standings ==
Championship standings were as follows:

Position	Driver	Car	Entrant	San.	Lon.	Lak.	Mal.	War.	Total
1	Bib Stillwell	Repco Brabham BT4 Climax FPF	B. S. Stillwell	6	6	9	6	-	27
2	Lex Davison	Cooper T62 Climax FPF; Repco Brabham BT4 Climax FPF	Ecurie Australie	-	3	-	9	3	15
3	Greg Cusack	Repco Brabham BT6 Ford; Elfin Catalina Ford	Scuderia Veloce	-	2	6	-	6	14
4	Jack Brabham	Repco Brabham BT7A Climax FPF	Ecurie Vitesse	9	-	-	-	-	9
4	Leo Geoghegan	Lotus 32 Ford	Total Team	-	-	-	-	9	9
4	Arnold Glass	Lotus 27 Ford; Cooper T55 Climax FPF	Capitol Motors Pty. Ltd.	3	-	4	-	2	9
4	Frank Matich	Repco Brabham BT7A Climax FPF	Total Team	-	9	-	-	-	9
8	John Youl	Cooper T55 Climax FPF	John C. Youl	4	4	-	-	-	8
9	Garrie Cooper	Elfin Mono Mk1 Ford	Elfin Sports Cars	-	-	-	4	-	4
9	Rocky Tresise	Cooper T62 Climax FPF	Ecurie Australie	-	-	-	-	4	4
11	Barry Collison	Repco Brabham BT2 Ford	Hunter & Delbridge Speed Equipment	-	-	3	-	-	3
11	Bill Pile	Elfin Mono Mk1 Ford	W. M. Pile	-	-	-	3	-	3
11	Glynn Scott	Lotus 27 Ford	Glynn Scott Motors	-	-	2	-	1	3
14	Andy Brown	Elfin Catalina Ford	Autocourse Elfin	-	-	-	2	-	2
14	David Walker	Brabham BT2 Ford	David Walker	2	-	-	-	-	2
16	Granton Harrison	Elfin Mono Mk1 Ford	G. T. Harrison	-	-	-	1	-	1
16	Jack Hobden	Cooper T51 Climax FPF	Louis Hobden	-	1	-	-	-	1
