= 1965 Australian One and a Half Litre Championship =

Layout of the Mount Panorama Circuit (1938-1986)

The 1965 Australian One and a Half Litre Championship was a CAMS sanctioned national motor racing title for drivers of racing cars complying with the Australian 1½ Litre Formula. The title was contested over a single 20 lap race at the Mount Panorama Circuit, Bathurst, New South Wales on 19 April 1965. The race also included a class for under 1100cc Australian Formula 2 cars.

== Results ==
Position	Driver	No.	Car	Entrant	Class	Laps
1	Bib Stillwell	6	Repco Brabham	BS Stillwell	A1½LF	20
2	Leo Geoghegan	5	Lotus 32	Total Team	A1½LF	20
3	John Ampt	14	Alexis	J Ampt	A1½LF	19
4	Glyn Scott	20	Lotus 27	Glyn Scott Motors	A1½LF	19
5	Noel Potts	12	Elfin Ford	N Potts	A1½LF	18
6	Ric Price	25	Lotus 18	R Price	AF2	17
7	Lionel Ayers	111	MRC Lotus 22	Motor Racing Components	AF2	16
8	Kevin Bartlett	38	Elfin Imp	J McGuire	AF2	16
9	Andy Macgregor	21	Ausper Ford	Total Armadale	AF2	16
DNF	Barry Collerson	2	Repco Brabham	B Collerson	AF2	14
DNF	Barry Lake	92	Jolus Minx	B Lake	A1½LF	13
DNF	Max Stewart	44	Rennmax	M Stewart	AF2	10
DNF	Mike Champion	17	Elfin Ford	M Champion	A1½LF	9
DNF	Phil West	18	Lotus 20	Kurt Keller Motors	AF2	8
DNF	Bob Salter	45	Lotus 22	Salter Motors	A1½LF	3
DNF	Allan Felton	4	Repco Brabham	Kurt Keller Motors	AF2	1
