= 1965 Tasman Series =

Motorsport series in Australia and New Zealand

The 1965 Tasman Series was a motor racing competition staged in New Zealand and Australia for cars complying with the Tasman Formula. The series, which began on 9 January and ended on 1 March after seven races, was the second Tasman Series. It was won by Jim Clark, driving Lotus 32B Coventry Climax.

== Races ==
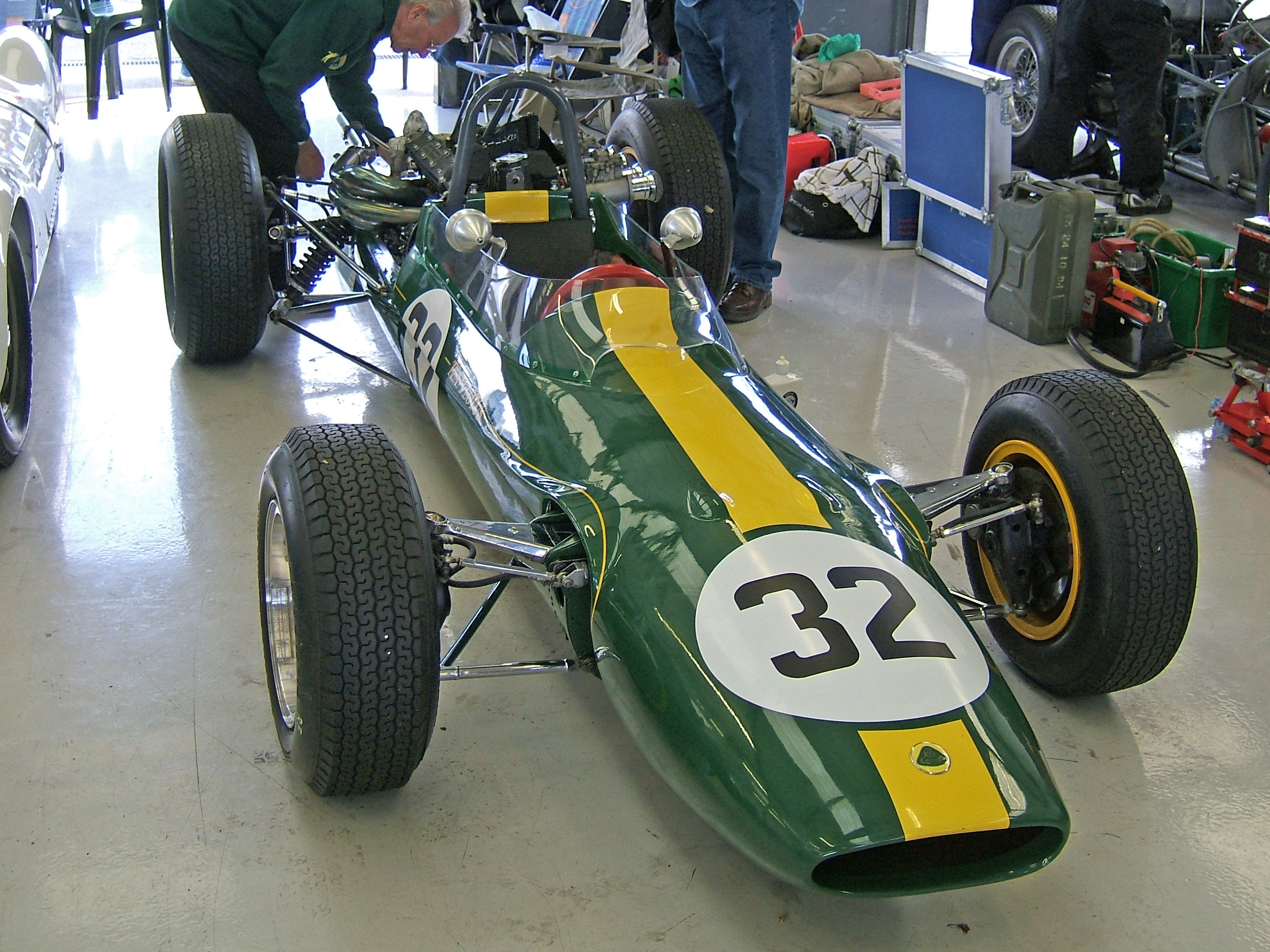
The Lotus 32B with which Jim Clark won the 1965 Tasman Series

The series was contested over seven races.

Round		Race name	Circuit	Date	Winning driver	Winning car	Winning team	Report
New Zealand	1	New Zealand Grand Prix	Pukekohe	9 January	(United Kingdom) Graham Hill	Repco Brabham BT11A Coventry Climax	Scuderia Veloce	Report
New Zealand	2	Levin International	Levin	16 January	(United Kingdom) Jim Clark	Lotus 32B Coventry Climax	Team Lotus	Report
New Zealand	3	Lady Wigram Trophy	Wigram	23 January	(United Kingdom) Jim Clark	Lotus 32B Coventry Climax	Team Lotus	Report
New Zealand	4	Teretonga International	Teretonga	30 January	(United Kingdom) Jim Clark	Lotus 32B Coventry Climax	Team Lotus	Report
Australia	5	Warwick Farm 100	Warwick Farm	14 February	(United Kingdom) Jim Clark	Lotus 32B Coventry Climax	Team Lotus	Report
Australia	6	Sandown International Cup	Sandown	21 February	(Australia) Jack Brabham	Repco Brabham BT11A Coventry Climax	Ecurie Vitesse	Report
Australia	7	Australian Grand Prix	Longford	1 March	(New Zealand) Bruce McLaren	Cooper T79 Coventry Climax	Bruce McLaren Motor Racing Ltd	Report

== Points system ==
Points were awarded for the first six positions at each race as shown in the following table.

Position	1	2	3	4	5	6
Points	9	6	4	3	2	1

Each driver could retain points from the New Zealand Grand Prix, the two best performances in the other three New Zealand races, and from all Australian races.

Race positions for which points were earned but not retained are shown on the table below within brackets.

== Series standings ==
Pos	Driver	Car	Entrant	Puk	Lev	Wig	Ter	War	San	Lon	Pts
1	(United Kingdom) Jim Clark	Lotus 32B Coventry Climax	Team Lotus	Ret	1	1	(1)	1	2	5	35 (44)
2	(New Zealand) Bruce McLaren	Cooper T79 Coventry Climax	Bruce McLaren Motor Racing Ltd	Ret	(5)	2	2	Ret	4	1	24 (26)
3	(Australia) Jack Brabham	Repco Brabham BT11A Coventry Climax	Ecurie Vitesse					2	1	2	21
4	(Australia) Frank Gardner	Repco Brabham BT11A Coventry Climax	Alec Mildren Racing Pty Ltd	2	2	4		Ret	Ret	Ret	15
=	(United States) Phil Hill	Cooper T70 Coventry Climax	Bruce McLaren Motor Racing Ltd	DNS	4	Ret	3	Ret	3	3	15
=	(New Zealand) Jim Palmer	Repco Brabham BT7A Coventry Climax	Lesco Racing Team; Jim Palmer Motor Racing	3	3	3	(5)	6	5	7	15 (17)
7	(United Kingdom) Graham Hill	Repco Brabham BT11A Coventry Climax	Scuderia Veloce	1				5	Ret	4	14
8	(New Zealand) Kerry Grant	Repco Brabham BT4 Coventry Climax	Lesco Racing Team; Scuderia Veloce	9	12	5	4	Ret	Ret	Ret	5
=	(Australia) Bib Stillwell	Repco Brabham BT11A Coventry Climax	Scuderia Veloce; Bib Stillwell					4	6	6	5
10	(Australia) Frank Matich	Repco Brabham BT7A Coventry Climax	Total Team					3	Ret	Ret	4
11	(New Zealand) John Riley	Lotus 18/21 Coventry Climax	J Riley	4	9	Ret	9				3
=	(New Zealand) Rex Flowers	Lola Mk 4A Coventry Climax	R Flowers	5	Ret	Ret	Ret				3
13	(New Zealand) Roly Levis	Repco Brabham BT6 Ford	Alec Mildren Racing	13	6	6	(6)	7	7	9	2 (3)
14	(Australia) Leo Geoghegan	Lotus 32 Ford	Total Team	6				8			1
—	(New Zealand) Andy Buchanan	Brabham BT6 Ford		7	7	7	Ret				0
—	(New Zealand) Bruce Abernethy	Cooper T66 Coventry Climax	Rothmans Driver Promotion Scheme	Ret	DNS	Ret	7				0
—	(New Zealand) Bill Thomasen	Brabham BT4 Coventry Climax		10	Ret	8	8				0
—	(New Zealand) Red Dawson	Cooper T53 Coventry Climax		8	10	Ret	10				0
—	(New Zealand) Graeme Lawrence	Brabham BT6 Ford	Molyslip Racing Team		8	Ret	11				0
—	(Australia) Glyn Scott	Lotus 27 Ford	Glyn Scott Motors					12		8	0
—	(Australia) Wally Mitchell	Lotus 20 Ford	East Burwood Motors Pty Ltd						8		0
—	(New Zealand) Ken Sager	Brabham BT6 Ford	J H Sager			9	Ret				0
—	(Australia) Rocky Tresise	Cooper T62 Coventry Climax	Ecurie Australie					9		Ret	0
—	(Australia) Keith Rilstone	Elfin Ford	Keith Rilstone						9		0
—	(New Zealand) Peter Gillum	Cooper T67 Ford			10	Ret					0
—	(Australia) Greg Cusack	Brabham BT10 Ford	Greg Cusack					10			0
—	(Australia) Jack Hobden	Cooper T51 Coventry Climax	Lewis Hobden Pty Ltd							10	0
—	(New Zealand) Ken Smith	Lotus 22 Ford		12	11						0
—	(New Zealand) Dene Hollier	Lotus 20B Ford		11	13						0
—	(Australia) David Walker	Brabham BT2 Ford	Kurt Keller Motors					11			0
—	(Australia) Mel McEwin	Elfin Formula Junior Ford	Mel McEwin							11	0
—	(New Zealand) Bill Stone	Cooper T52 Ford		14							0
—	(Australia) Lex Davison	Repco Brabham BT4 Coventry Climax	Ecurie Australie	15				Ret	DNS		0
—	(Australia) Arnold Glass	Cooper T55 Coventry Climax	Capitol Motors Pty Ltd	Ret							0
—	(Australia) Barry Collerson	Repco Brabham BT2 Ford	Hunter & Delbridge Speed Equipment						Ret		0
—	(Australia) Geoff McClelland	Repco Brabham BT2 Ford	Geoff McClelland					Ret			0
—	(Australia) John McDonald	Cooper T53 Coventry Climax	Bill Patterson Motors						Ret	Ret	0
—	(Australia) Lyn Archer	Elfin Formula Junior Ford	Lyn Archer Motors							Ret	0
—	(Australia) Bob Jane	Elfin Mono Mk 1 Ford	Autoland Pty Ltd							Ret	0
—	(New Zealand) Bryan Thomas	Lotus 27 Ford		DNS							0
Pos	Driver	Car	Entrant	Puk	Lev	Wig	Ter	War	San	Lon	Pts

Colour	Result
Gold	Winner
Silver	Second place
Bronze	Third place
Green	Points classification
Blue	Non-points classification
Blue	Non-classified finish (NC)
Purple	Retired, not classified (Ret)
Red	Did not qualify (DNQ)
Red	Did not pre-qualify (DNPQ)
Black	Disqualified (DSQ)
White	Did not start (DNS)
White	Withdrew (WD)
White	Race cancelled (C)
Blank	Did not practice (DNP)
Blank	Did not arrive (DNA)
Blank	Excluded (EX)
