= 1961 Australian Tourist Trophy =

Layout of the Mount Panorama Circuit (1938-1986)

The 1961 Australian Tourist Trophy was a motor race open to Sports Cars and invited GT Cars, staged at the Mount Panorama Circuit near Bathurst in New South Wales, Australia on 1 October 1961. The race was organised by the Australian Racing Drivers Club. It was the fifth in a sequence of annual Australian Tourist Trophy races, and was recognized by the Confederation of Australian Motor Sport as the Australian championship for sports cars.

The race was won by Bib Stillwell driving a Cooper Monaco.

== Results ==
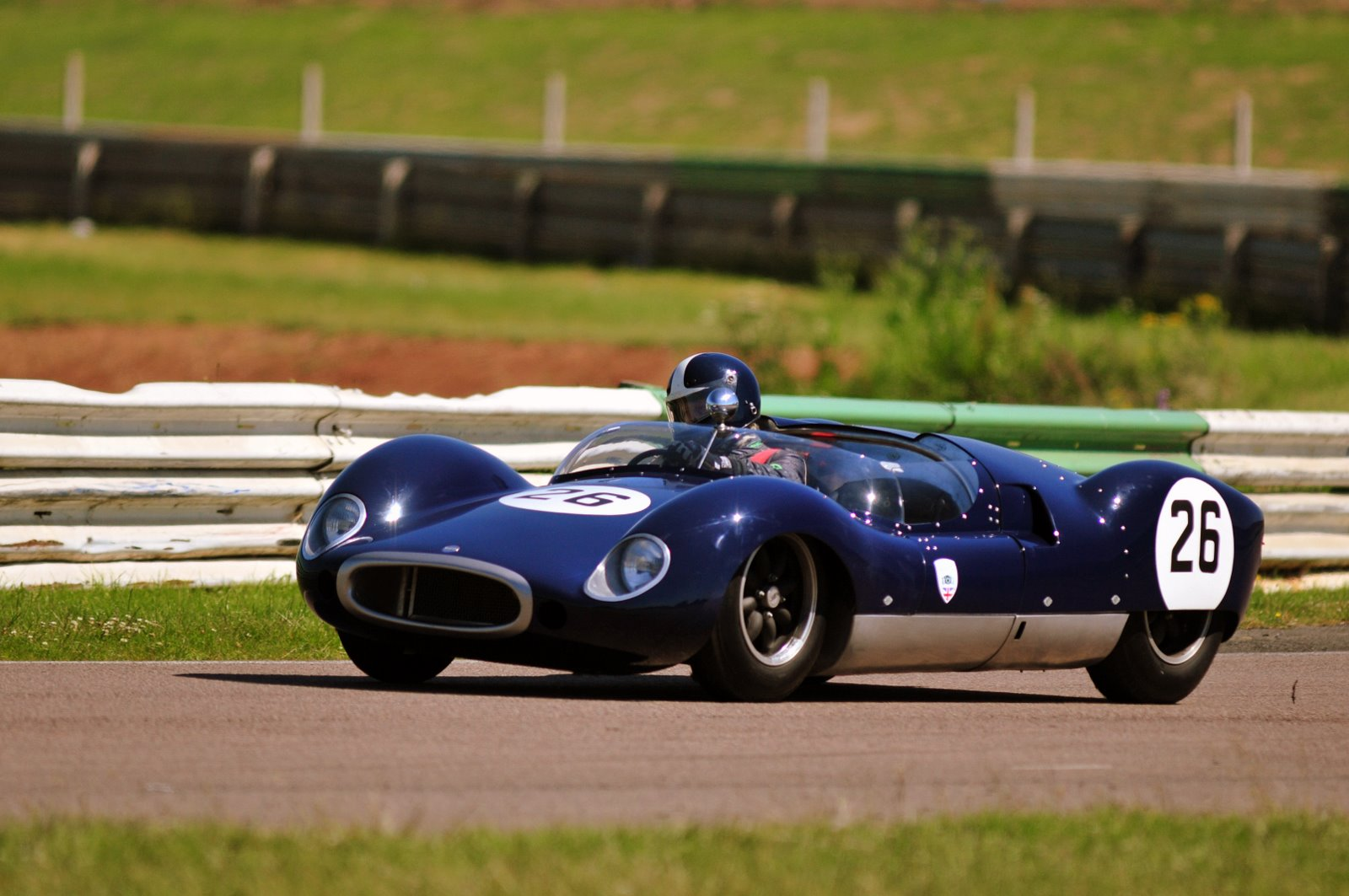
Bib Stillwell won the 1961 Australian Tourist Trophy driving a Cooper Monaco, similar to the example pictured above

Position	Driver	No.	Car	Entrant	Class	Class pos.	Laps
1	Bib Stillwell	6	Cooper Monaco Coventry Climax	BS Stillwell	2001 to 3000 cc	1	19
2	Frank Matich	86	Jaguar D-Type	Team Leaton	Over 3000 cc	1	19
3	Bob Jane	133	Maserati 300S	Autoland Pty Ltd	2001 to 3000 cc	2	18
4	Alan Jack	4	Cooper T39 Coventry Climax	A Jack	1101 to 1500 cc	1	17
5	Graham White	79	Lotus XI Coventry Climax	Continental Motors	751 to 1100 cc	1	16
6	John Suttor	120	Jaguar XK140	J Suttor	Over 3000 cc	2	?
7	Ralph Sach	82	Elfin MG	J Hextall	1501 to 2000 cc	1	?
8	Tony Reynolds	96	Triumph TR3	AJ Reynolds	1501 to 2000 cc	2	?
9	Charlie Campbell	94	Triumph TR3	C Campbell	1501 to 2000 cc	3	?
10	Ted Laker	101	Triumph TR3	E Laker	2001 to 3000 cc	3	15
11	Sam Miller	101	Austin-Healey 100S	S Miller	2001 to 3000 cc	4	15
12	John Evans	33	MGTC	JL Evans	1101 to 1500 cc	2	14
13	Peter Addison	24	Triumph TR	PG Addison	1501 to 2000 cc	3	13
14	George Kypson	19	Austin Sprite	G Kypson	751 to 1100 cc	2	?
15	Ron Marshall	23	AC Ace Bristol	R Marshall	1501 to 2000 cc	4	11
DNF	Derek Netting	9	MGA	Dents Auto Service	1501 to 2000 cc	-	?
DNF	Mike Nedelko	27	Prad	M Nedelko	2001 to 3000 cc	-	?
DNF	John Martin	111	Lotus XI Coventry Climax	Martins Neutral Bay Motors	751 to 1100 cc	-	11
DNF	Murray Carter	3	Corvette Special	MW Carter	Over 3000 cc	-	8
DNF	Alec Lazich	53	Malford Ford	A Lazich	1101 to 1500 cc	-	4
DNF	Peter Ganderton	37	MGA	P Ganderton	1101 to 1500 cc	-	3
DNF	Don Holland	10	Austin-Healey	Robinson's Auto Park Pty Ltd	2001 to 3000 cc	-	2
DNF	Tom Sulman	99	Aston Martin DB3S	T Sulman	2001 to 3000 cc	-	1
DNF	Harry Cape	126	Aston Martin DB3S	J Wright	2001 to 3000 cc	-	0
Disq	John Malcolm	75	Austin-Healey Sprite	Dents Auto Service	751 to 1100 cc	-	?
DNS	John Ampt	11	Cooper T33 Jaguar	J Ampt	Over 3000 cc	-	-
DNS	Tom Sulman	99	Lotus XI Coventry Climax	T Sulman	1101 to 1500 cc	-	-
DNS	Bob Cutler	14	Austin-Healey	R Cutler	2001 to 3000 cc	-	-

- DNF = did not finish
- Disq = disqualified
- DNS = did not start

=== Notes ===
- Attendance: 12,000
- Entries: 43
- Starters: 25
- Finishers: 15
- Race distance: 19 laps – 75 miles (120 km)
- Winner's race time: 53 minutes 11.9 seconds
- Fastest lap: Bib Stillwell - 2 minutes 44.9 seconds
