= 1965 Australian Grand Prix =

Motor race

- Race 7 of 7 in 1965 Tasman Series
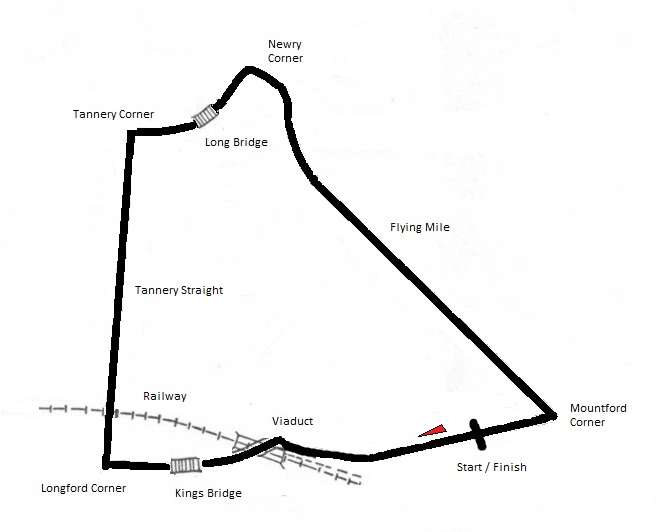

Race details
- Date: 1 March 1965
- Location: Longford Circuit, Longford, Tasmania, Australia
- Course: Temporary road circuit
- Course length: 7.242 km (4.501 miles)
- Distance: 26 laps, 182 km (114.4 miles)
- Weather: Sunny

Pole position
Driver	(New Zealand) Bruce McLaren	Cooper-Climax
- Time: 2'20.3

Fastest lap
Driver	(Australia) Jack Brabham	Repco Brabham-Climax
- Time: 2'18.0

Podium
First	(New Zealand) Bruce McLaren	Cooper-Climax
Second	(Australia) Jack Brabham	Repco Brabham-Climax
Third	(United States) Phil Hill	Cooper-Climax

The 1965 Australian Grand Prix was a motor race held at the Longford Circuit in Tasmania, Australia on 1 March 1965. It was open to Racing Cars complying with the Australian National Formula or the Australian 1½ Litre Formula. It was the 30th Australian Grand Prix.

The race, which had 18 starters, was the seventh and final round of the 1965 Tasman Series and round two of the 1965 Australian Drivers' Championship. It was the last Australian Grand Prix to be held at the Longford Circuit. Bruce McLaren won the race, his second and last Australian Grand Prix victory. Australian driver Rocky Tresise was killed in a second lap accident in which photographer Robin D'Abrera also died.

== Classification ==
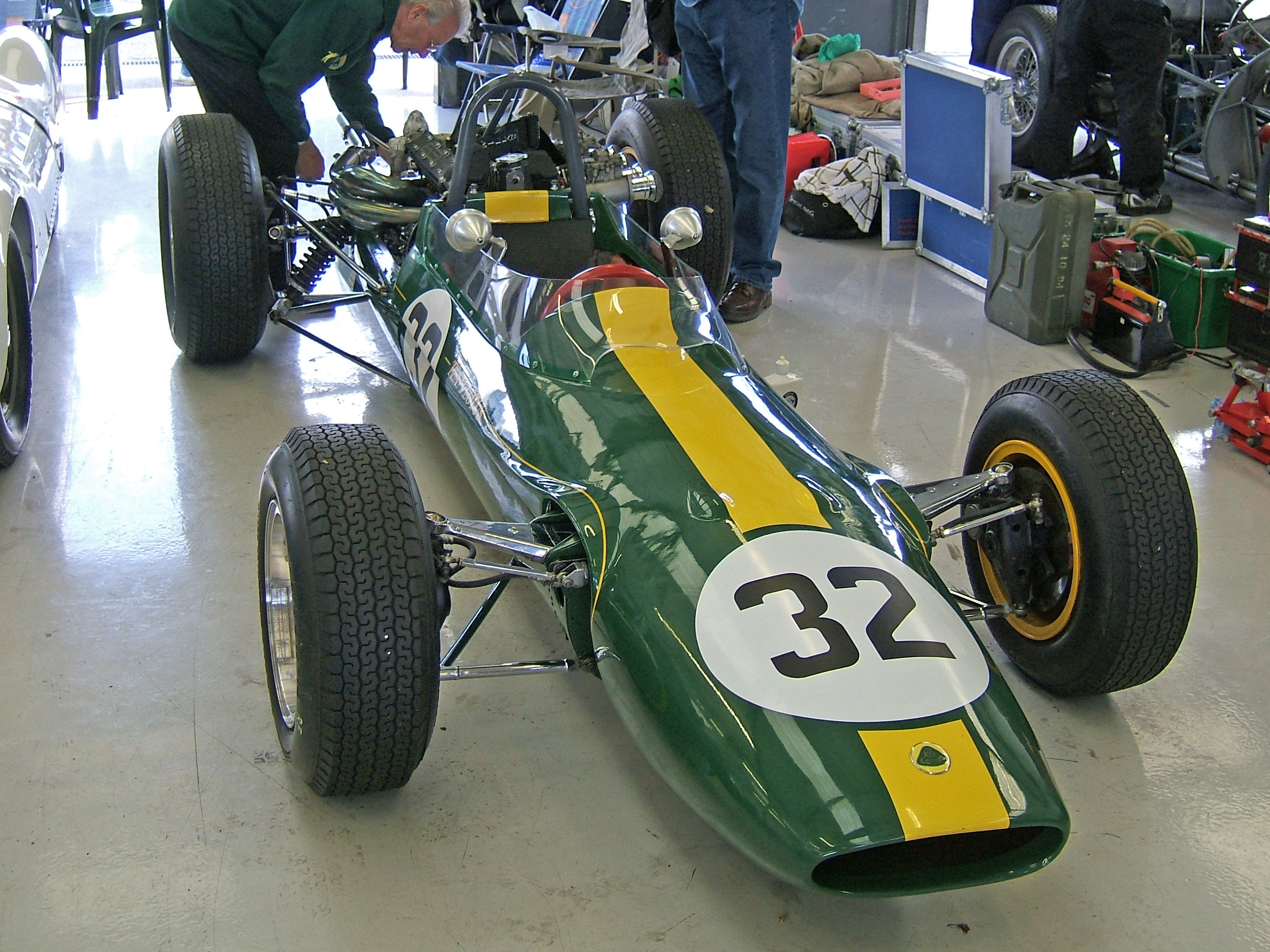
Jim Clark placed fifth driving this Lotus 32B

Pos	No.	Driver	Entrants	Car	Laps	Time / Remarks
1	10	(New Zealand) Bruce McLaren	Bruce McLaren Motor Racing Limited	Cooper T79 / Climax FPF	26	1h 01m 10.9s
2	4	(Australia) Jack Brabham	Ecurie Vitesse	Repco Brabham BT11A / Climax FPF	26	1h 01m 14.2s
3	11	(United States) Phil Hill	Bruce McLaren Motor Racing Limited	Cooper T70/79 / Climax FPF	26	1h 01m 15.8s
4	1	(United Kingdom) Graham Hill	Scuderia Veloce Pty Ltd	Repco Brabham BT11A / Climax FPF	26	1h 01m 18.8s
5	8	(United Kingdom) Jim Clark	Team Lotus	Lotus 32B / Climax FPF	26	1h 01m 19.3s
6	6	(Australia) Bib Stillwell	B.S. Stillwell	Repco Brabham BT11A / Climax FPF	26	1h 02m 25.0s
7	5	(New Zealand) Jim Palmer	Jim Palmer	Repco Brabham BT7A / Climax FPF	25	
8	7	(Australia) Frank Gardner	Alec Mildren Racing Pty Ltd	Repco Brabham BT11A / Climax FPF	23	
9	17	(Australia) Glyn Scott	Glyn Scott Motors	Lotus 27 / Ford 1.5	23	
10	21	(New Zealand) Roly Levis	Roly Levis	Repco Brabham BT6 / Ford 1.5	22	Accident
11	9	(Australia) John McDonald	Bill Patterson Motors	Cooper T53 / Climax FPF	22	
12	15	(Australia) Jack Hobden	Lewis Hobden Pty Ltd	Cooper T51 / Climax FPF	21	
13	18	(Australia) Mel McEwin	Mel McEwin	Elfin Mono Ford 1.5	19	
Ret	3	(Australia) Frank Matich	Total Team	Repco Brabham BT7A / Climax FPF	14	Suspension
Ret	23	(Australia) Bob Jane	Autoland Pty Ltd	Elfin Mono / Ford 1.5	4	Transmission
Ret	20	(Australia) Lyn Archer	Lyn Archer Motors	Elfin Junior / Ford 1.5	4	Engine
Ret	2	(Australia) Kerry Grant	Scuderia Veloce Pty Ltd	Repco Brabham BT4 / Climax FPF	3	Engine
Ret	12	(Australia) Rocky Tresise	Ecurie Australie	Cooper T62 / Climax FPF	1	Fatal Accident
DNS	9	(Australia) Bill Patterson	Bill Patterson Motors	Cooper T51 / Climax FPF		
DNS	19	(Australia) Geoff McLelland	G.B. McLelland	Repco Brabham BT2 / Ford 1.5		
DNS	22	(Australia) Barry Collerson	Hunter & Delbridge Speed Equipment	Repco Brabham BT2 / Ford 1.5		
DNS	25	(Australia) Les Howard	Howard & Sons Racing Team	Lotus 27 / Ford 1.5		
DNS	40	(Australia) David Hallam	D. J. Hallam	Elfin Junior / Ford 1.1		

== Notes ==
- Pole position: Bruce McLaren – 2'20.3 (The grid was set from lap times recorded in a ten lap qualifying race on the Saturday)
- Fastest lap: Jack Brabham – 2'18.0 (117.4 mph) – New record

Preceded by 1965 Sandown International	Tasman Series; 1965	Succeeded by 1966 New Zealand Grand Prix
Preceded by 1965 Warwick Farm International	Australian Drivers' Championship; 1965	Succeeded by 1965 Victorian Road Racing Championship
Preceded by 1964 Australian Grand Prix	Australian Grand Prix; 1965	Succeeded by 1966 Australian Grand Prix
