= 1964 Australian Grand Prix =

- Race 5 of 8 in 1964 Tasman Series

Race details
- Date: 9 February 1964
- Location: Sandown Park, Melbourne, Victoria, Australia
- Course: Permanent racing facility
- Course length: 3.1 km (1.92 miles)
- Distance: 63 laps, 195.3 km (120.96 miles)
- Weather: Sunny

Pole position
Driver	(Australia) Jack Brabham	Repco Brabham-Climax
- Time: 1'09.6

Fastest lap
Drivers	(Australia) Jack Brabham	Repco Brabham-Climax
	(New Zealand) Bruce McLaren	Cooper-Climax
- Time: 1'09.5

Podium
First	(Australia) Jack Brabham	Repco Brabham-Climax
Second	(Australia) Bib Stillwell	Repco Brabham-Climax
Third	(Australia) John Youl	Cooper-Climax

The 1964 Australian Grand Prix was a motor race held at the Sandown Park circuit in suburban Melbourne, Victoria, Australia on 9 February 1964. It was the twenty ninth Australian Grand Prix and was also Round 5 of the 1964 Tasman Series and Round 1 of the 1964 Australian Drivers' Championship. The race was open to Racing Cars complying with the Australian National Formula or the Australian 1½ Litre Formula.

Defending winner Jack Brabham won the race driving a Repco Brabham. It was his third and final Australian Grand Prix victory.

== Classification ==
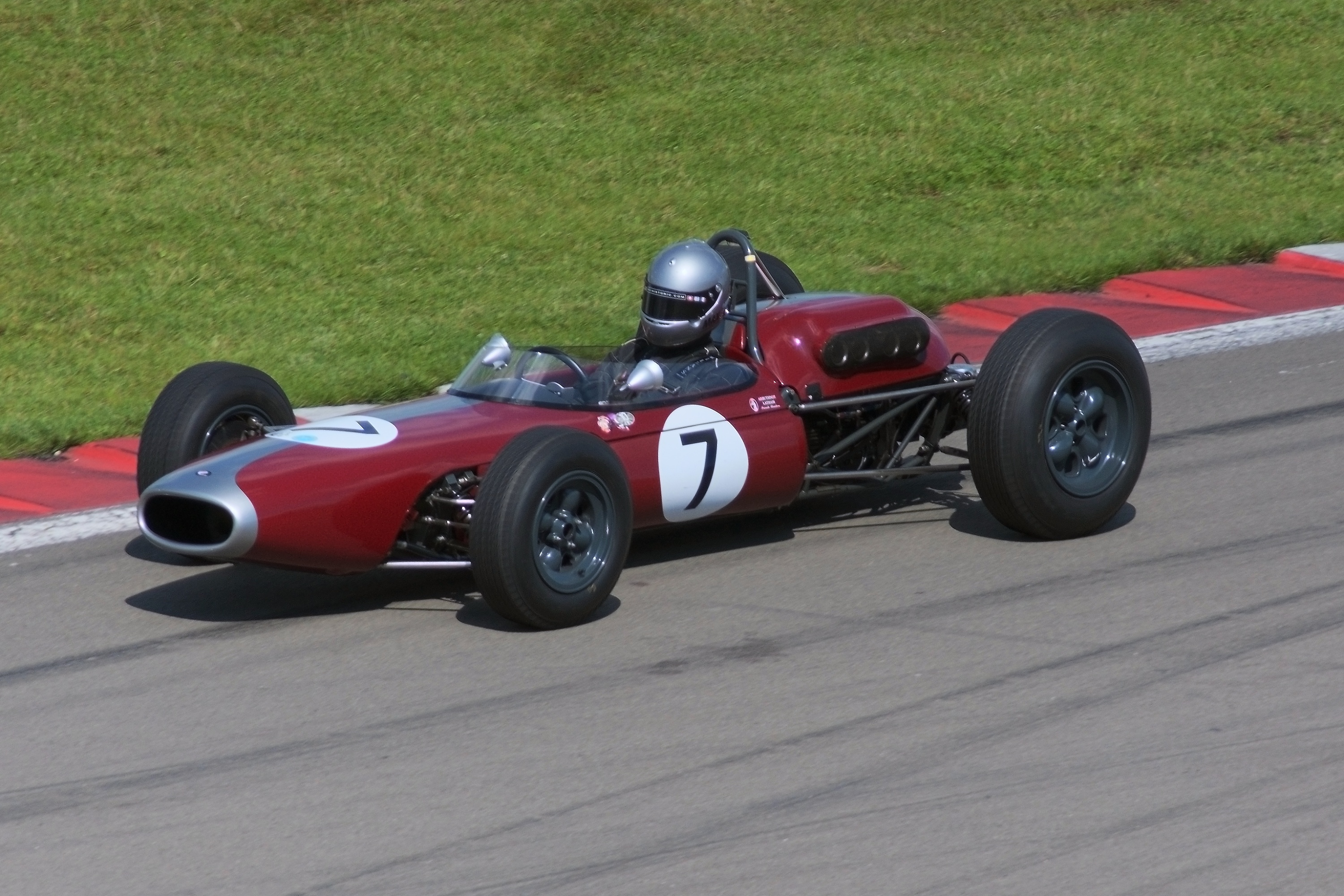
Jack Brabham won the race driving a Repco Brabham BT7A, similar to the example pictured above

Results as follows:

Pos	No.	Driver	Entrant	Car	Laps	Time / comments
1	1	(Australia) Jack Brabham	Ecurie Vitesse	Repco Brabham BT7A / Climax FPF	63	1h 15m 19.2s
2	6	(Australia) Bib Stillwell	B.S. Stillwell	Repco Brabham BT4 / Climax FPF	63	1h 15m 31.1s
3	5	(Australia) John Youl	John C. Youl	Cooper T55 / Climax FPF	63	1h 15m 34.1s
4	8	(United States) Timmy Mayer	Bruce McLaren Motor Racing Pty. Ltd.	Cooper T70 / Climax FPF	63	1h 16m 06.5s
5	2	(New Zealand) Denny Hulme	Ecurie Vitesse	Repco Brabham BT4 / Climax FPF	60	
6	12	(New Zealand) Jim Palmer	J. Palmer	Cooper T53 / Climax FPF	60	
7	17	(Australia) Arnold Glass	Capitol Motors Pty. Ltd.	Lotus 27 / Ford 1.5	57	
8	14	(New Zealand) Tony Shelly	A. L. Shelly	Lola Mk4A / Climax FPF	57	
9	26	(Australia) David Walker	David Walker	Brabham BT2 / Ford 1.5	54	
10	21	(Australia) Frank Gardner	Alex. Mildren Racing Pty. Ltd.	Brabham BT6 / Ford 1.5	49	
Ret	9	(Australia) Bill Patterson (Australia) Doug Whiteford	Bill Patterson Motors	Cooper T53 / Climax FPF	42	Driver sick / Accident
Ret	7	(New Zealand) Bruce McLaren	Bruce McLaren Motor Racing Pty. Ltd.	Cooper T70 / Climax FPF	37	Engine
Ret	10	(Australia) Doug Whiteford	Bill Patterson Motors	Cooper T51 / Climax FPF 2.2	36	Engine
Ret	4	(Australia) Lex Davison	Ecurie Australie	Cooper T62 / Climax FPF	29	Piston
Ret	22	(Australia) David Fletcher	D. K. Fletcher	Lola Mk5 / Ford 1.5	29	Accident
Ret	24	(Australia) Mel McEwin	Mel McEwin	Elfin FJ / Ford 1.5	24	Gearbox
Ret	18	(Australia) Keith Rilstone	K. N. Rilstone	Elfin FJ / Ford 1.5	5	Piston
Ret	11	(Australia) Frank Matich	Total Team	Repco Brabham BT7A / Climax FPF	4	Differential
Ret	16	(Australia) Charlie Smith	C. G. Smith	Elfin FJ / Ford 1.5	2	Timing Gear
Ret	15	(Australia) Tony Osborne	A. J. R. Osborne	Cooper T53 / Climax FPF	2	Differential
Ret	19	(Australia) Wally Mitchell	East Burwood Motors	MRD Brabham / Ford 1.5		
DNS	25	(Australia) Leo Geoghegan	Total Team	Lotus 27 / Ford 1.5		
DNS	20	(Australia) Glyn Scott	Glyn Scott Motors	Lotus 27 / Ford 1.5		
DNS	23	(Australia) Jack Hunnam	Jack Hunnam Motors	Elfin Catalina / Ford 1.5		

=== Notes ===
- Pole position: Jack Brabham – 1:09.6
- Starters: 21
- Winner's average speed: 96.7 mph (155.6 km/h)
- Fastest lap: Jack Brabham / Bruce McLaren – 1:09.5

p

== In popular culture ==
A "science-fiction" version of the 1964 Australian Grand Prix was depicted five years before it took place in the American film On the Beach (1959), based on the Nevil Shute novel of the same name.

Preceded by 1964 Teretonga International	Tasman Series; 1964	Succeeded by 1964 Warwick Farm International
Preceded by 1963 Hordern Trophy	Australian Drivers' Championship; 1964	Succeeded by 1964 South Pacific Trophy
Preceded by 1963 Australian Grand Prix	Australian Grand Prix; 1964	Succeeded by 1965 Australian Grand Prix
