= 1962 Australian Tourist Trophy =

Motor race

The 1962 Australian Tourist Trophy was a motor race staged at the Mallala circuit in South Australia on 28 December 1962. It was the sixth annual Australian Tourist Trophy race, and was recognized by the Confederation of Australian Motor Sport as the Australian championship for sports cars.

The race was won by Bib Stillwell driving a Cooper Monaco.

== Results ==
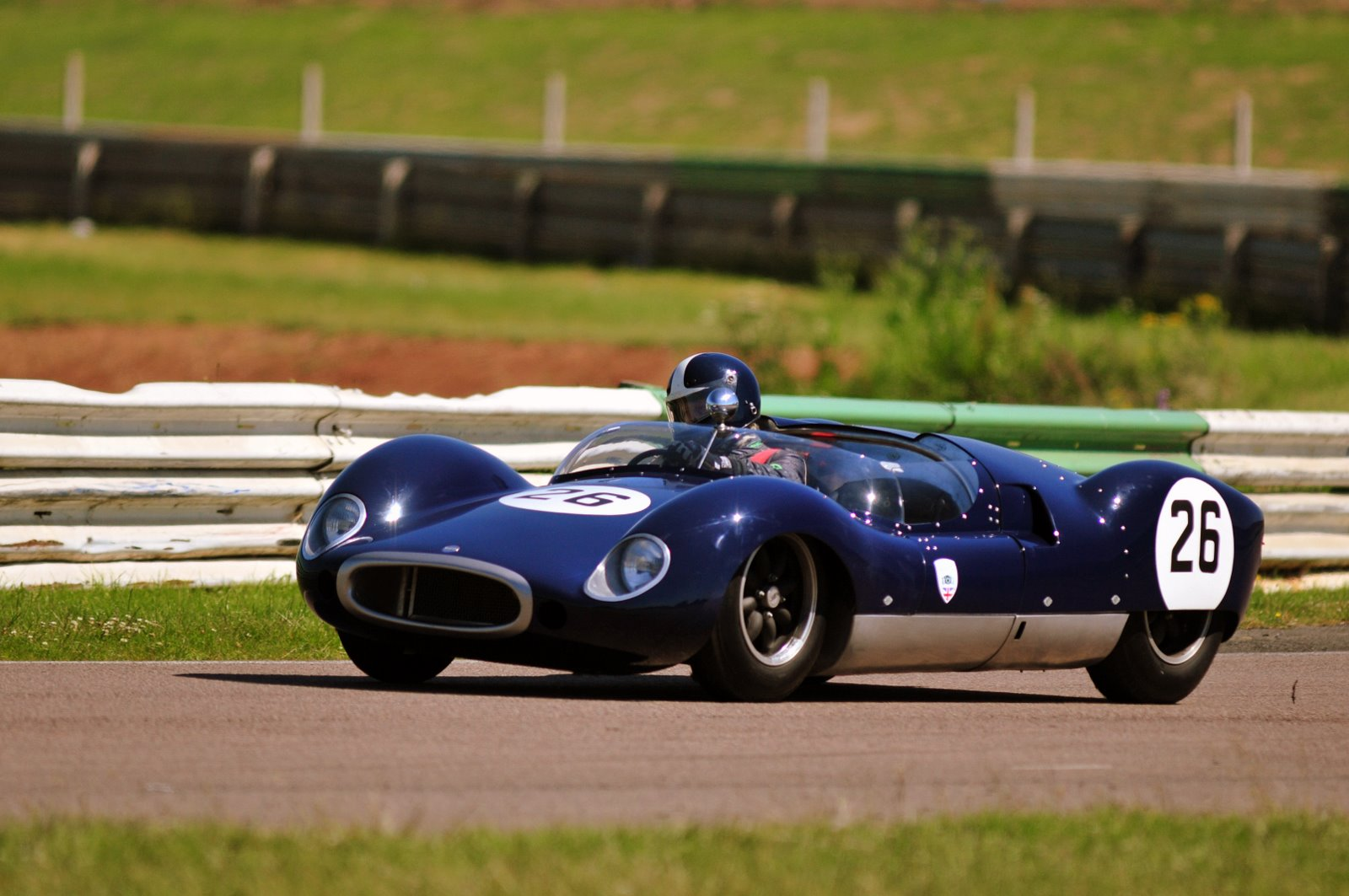
Bib Stillwell won the 1962 Australian Tourist Trophy driving a Cooper Monaco, similar to that pictured above

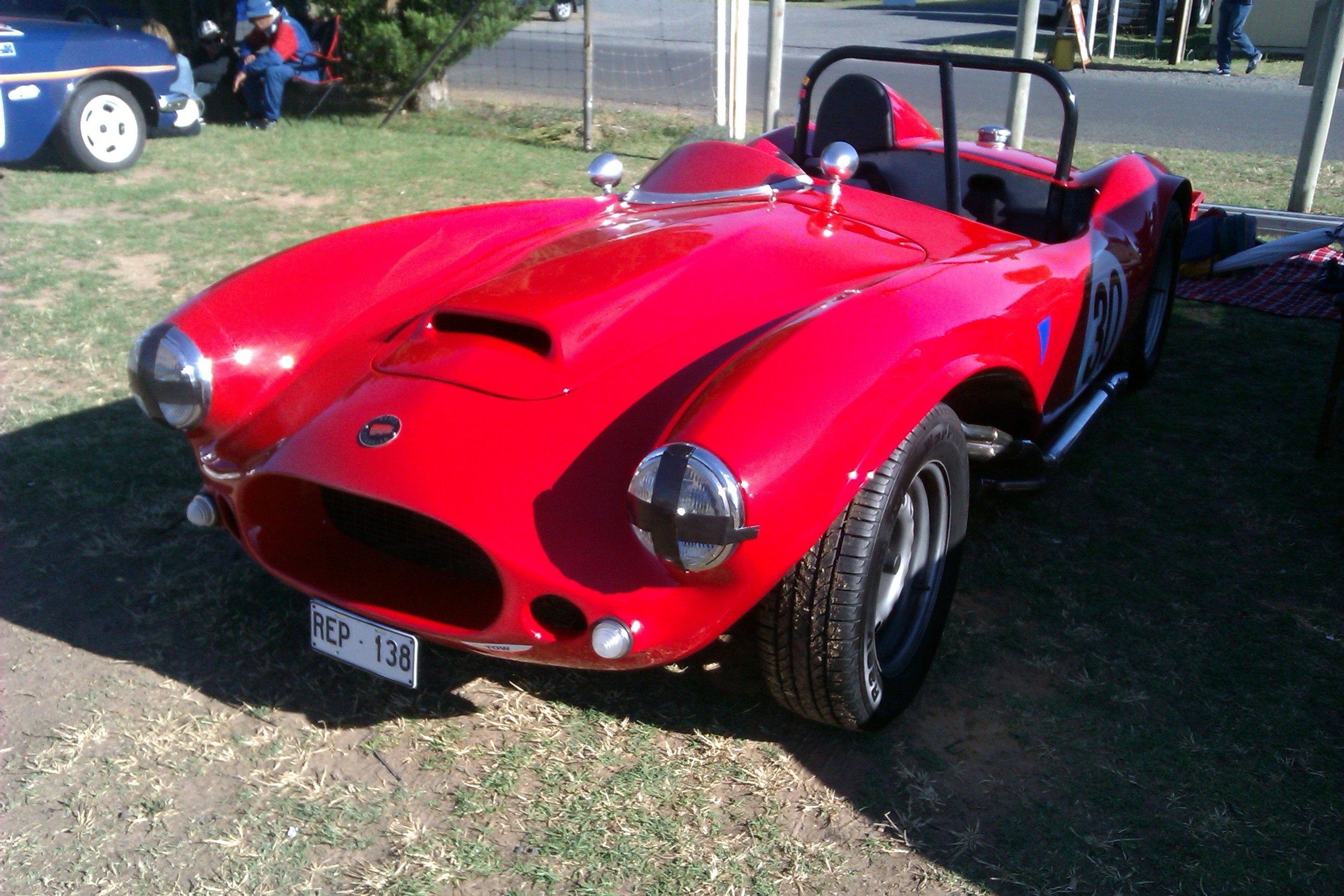
John Newmarch placed third driving the Ricardian. The car is pictured above at Mallala in 2012

Position	Driver	No.	Car	Entrant	Class pos.	Class	Laps	Time
1	Bib Stillwell	6	Cooper Monaco Coventry Climax	B. Stillwell	1	2001 - 3000cc	40	80:59.7
2	Bob Jane	68	Maserati 300S	R. Jane	2	2001 - 3000cc	39	82:53.7
3	John Newmarch	5	Ricardian Holden	J.C. Bruggeman	3	2001 - 3000cc	38	82:28.3
4	Geoff Vercoe	34	Cicada	D. Trengove & G. Vercoe	1	Up to 1100cc	37	81:00.8
5	B. Morrell	49	Elfin Consul	B. Morrell	1	1501 - 2000cc	37	81:29.0
6	John Edwards	37	Morgan Plus 6	Team Cerberus	2	1501 - 2000cc	37	83:12.4
7	Alan Jack	10	Cooper Coventry Climax	A. Jack	1	1101 - 1500cc	36	81:03.4
8	R. Morphett	41	MGA	R. Morphett	3	1501 - 2000cc	36	82:32.4
9	M. Lewis	51	Elfin	M.A. Lewis	2	1101 - 1500cc	35	81:31.3
10	John Allison	48	Studebaker	J. Allison & J. Steele	1	Over 3000cc	35	81:32.0
11	Josephine Heysen	72	Lotus 7	Miss J. Heysen	2	Up to 1100cc	35	81:52.8
12	A. Alcock	28	Elfin	A.J. Alcock	3	1101 - 1500cc	34	81:16.0
13	I. Alexander	11	Billancourt	I.W. Alexander	3	Up to 1100cc	27	81:46.3
DNF	G. Edgerton	12	Cooper Jaguar	G. Edgerton	-	?	34	-
DNF	A. Williams	52	Jaguar	A.E. Williams	-	Over 3000cc	33	-
DNF	Graham West	38	Austin-Healey Sprite	J.W. Taylor & Sons Ltd.	-	Up to 1100cc	22	-
DNF	Peter Wilkinson	20	Elfin Skoda	Associated Designers	-	Up to 1100cc	5	-
Exc	David McKay	7	Elfin Mallala Cosworth	Scuderia Veloce	-	Up to 1100cc	39	82:36.5

Note:

- McKay finished the race in second place, but was subsequently disqualified from the results for receiving outside assistance to restart his car after a spin during the race.

=== Race statistics ===
- Number of starters: 18
- Number of finishers: 13
- Race distance: 40 laps – 84 miles
- Weather: Drizzling rain
- Start: Le Mans type
- Fastest lap: D. McKay, 1:56.9 (New lap record, Sports - Up to 1100cc)
