= Cooper Monaco =

The name Cooper Monaco may refer to one of three different sports racing cars built by the Cooper Car Company between 1959 and 1964:

- Cooper T49
- Cooper T57
- Cooper T61
