= Roly Levis =

New Zealand racing driver (1925–2013)

- Nationality: New Zealand
- Full name: Rollo Athol Levis
- Born: 15 March 1925 Hamilton, New Zealand
- Died: 1 October 2013 (aged 88) Tauranga, New Zealand
- Retired: 1970

New Zealand Gold Star Championship
- Years active: 1963-1970
- Teams: Levis
- Starts: 32
- Wins: 6
- Poles: 6
- Fastest laps: 5
- Best finish: 1st in 1967,1969

Previous series
- 1964-69 1959, 1961, 1963 1961, 1967, 1969 1965-67 1964 1964 1969: Tasman Series; Lady Wigram Trophy Formula Libre NZ 1,5 Litre Championship; Australian Drivers Championship; Australian 1 1/2 Litre Championship; Macau Guia 101 Endurance Race

Championship titles
- 1967, 1969 1965, 1966, 1967: New Zealand Gold Star Championship; NZ 1.5 Litre Championship

Rollo Athol Levis (15 March 1925 - 1 October 2013) was a New Zealand racing driver. He won several championships in his home country, including the Gold Star Championship, which he won twice. Regarded as one of the best drivers from his country to never venture to Europe, he enjoyed his biggest levels of success in Brabham cars, rising to his full potential in the BT18.

== Early life and beginnings ==
Rollo Athol Levis was born in Hamilton on 15 March 1925. His older brother Murray (born 1923) raced around grass paddocks in an old Studebaker, what ignited Roly's love to cars. At age 13, he learned to drive on his parents' farm and soon began repairing cars at his uncle's farm in Karaka. He also raced Murray until the latter went into aircraft maintenance. So at 15, Levis dropped out of Hamilton Tech to work at a service station in Hillcrest. But at 17, he started driving a milk truck and took up a panelbeating apprenticeship after WWII, after which Roly participated in multiple hillclimbs in various vehicles, including a Riley Kestrel he sold later. After a car painter friend talked him into joining forces in Putaruru, he opened his own paint and panel workshop there. He then acquired a Willys Four powered midget, replacing so a pushrod Chevrolet, with the new midget helping him achieve multiple successes on the North Island Speedway circuits.

== Career ==
However, his motorsport aspirations changed by the advent of the 1954 New Zealand Grand Prix at Ardmore, recalling: "I went to the first Ardmore [in 1954] — that was my first car race, and I was particularly interested in the mechanicals of the cars. I'd been doing grass track racing, so I was probably thinking I'd like to have a go at circuit racing if I could afford it. I tried to make an old Riley do something it couldn't." But he didn't start in the race and during that time, he started designing and constructing his own sports car, the RAL, named after the initials of his full name, which he also constructed from parts of the Morris Minor and Triumph Mayflower. Built for the 1955/56 season on the chassis of the Lotus Elite, Roly also stated he built the engine too. He intended the car to be Ford-powered, although it was initially powered by a modified Morris Minor which was later replaced by an imported Williment cylinder conversion from England, the only one of its kind in New Zealand. Later powered by a Ford V10 that clocked 112 mph (180.2 km/h) in Ohakea, the RAL also holds the record for the fastest Ford 10-engined car in Australasia. In 1959, he eventually started his first professional race, the Lady Wigram Trophy, finishing 12th. The next year, he was offered a Formula Two Lotus 16 for the next Lady Wigram Trophy, but he chose not to race it, as he later sold the RAL to buy a Cooper T52 that belonged to Denny Hulme. As it was outpaced by the Ford engines, Levis installed a 1475cc Ford engine himself and drove the car to multiple successes afterwards. At Levin, he suffered a major crash in 1962 that broke both of his legs, to which he refers as his "first major circuit accident". While fixing the wrecked car, he replaced the original BMC 1-litre engine with a Ford 1.5 "for more power". The next year, Roly finished 4th in the Levin International, racing against actual Formula One drivers in their teams' cars. He repeated his success at Waimate in 1963, finishing third overall behind Jim Palmer and Tony Shelly. For the 1963 and 1964 seasons, Roly bought an ex-Piers Courage Lotus 22 with a 1650 cc pushrod engine. And although he still showed consistent performances in the car, he searched for a new car after winning at Pukekohe 1964. Smitten with Andrew Buchanan's Ford-powered Brabham BT6, he bought the same car, previously owned by Alec Mildren and Frank Gardner. He debuted with the car at Warwick Farm and reached 3rd place at the Australian 1 1/2 Litre Championship. Back home, Roly upgraded to a Brabham BT18 and prepared for the Tasman Series and the inaugural National Formula Championship, short "NF". After battling Leo Geoghegan at the New Zealand Grand Prix, he secured his first Tasman point at Levin and finished sixth at Teretonga Park, securing himself the NF title. He also clinched the NF title in 1966 and 1967 and broke Jim Palmer's dominance by winning the 1967 Gold Star Championship. In 1968, Levis got an offer from Castrol to travel to the United Kingdom and race a Cooper, but he turned the offer down. After a troubled start to the Gold Star that same year, Levis secured his second title at Timaru in a Brabham BT23B he got shipped from Southampton by Frank Williams after a showdown with Graeme Lawrence and his McLaren M4A. After winning the Gold Star, Roly moved under Air New Zealand sponsorship to Singapore and Japan to compete in F5000 cars, grabbing two second places and even winning 500 million ¥ (ca. US$12,000) in Japan, but he never got the money. After racing another two races in the 1969/70 Gold Star, Roly sold the BT23B and officially retired from racing.

== Life after motorsport ==
After retiring in 1970, Levis assisted numerous young drivers in single seaters and saloon cars with technical help and driving advice, including such as Laurence Brownlie and Ken Smith. Smith even wrote in his biography: "After he [Roly] rebuilt my Lotus 41, I told him it wasn't tracking like it should, so he came and watched me. When I came in he said, 'Get a pillow', because he reckoned I was leaning too far forward — and of course he was spot on." Levis died of cancer at age 88 on 1 October 2013, in Tauranga.

== Personal life ==
Levis had four children with his wife, Judi, Vivien, Noel and Ross. He also has six grandchildren.
