= New Zealand Gold Star Championship =

- Country: New Zealand
- Inaugural season: 1957
- Folded: 2004

The New Zealand Gold Star Championship was a motorsporting event run from 1957 till 2004 in New Zealand.

== List of winners ==
1957-1977

Year	Winner	Vehicle
1957	Ross Jensen (New Zealand)	Ferrari 750 Monza (Italy)
1958	Ross Jensen (New Zealand) (2)	Maserati 250F (Italy)
1959	Bruce McLaren (New Zealand)	Cooper T45 (United Kingdom)
1960	Syd Jensen (New Zealand)	Cooper T45 (United Kingdom)
1961	Denny Hulme (New Zealand)	Cooper T51 (United Kingdom)
1962	Pat Hoare (New Zealand)	Ferrari 256 (Italy)
1963	Angus Hyslop (New Zealand)	Cooper T45 (United Kingdom)
1964	Jim Palmer (New Zealand)	Cooper T45 (United Kingdom)
1965	Jim Palmer (New Zealand) (2)	Brabham BT7A (Australia)
1966	Jim Palmer (New Zealand) (3)	Lotus 32B (United Kingdom)
1967	Roly Levis (New Zealand)	Brabham BT18 (United Kingdom)
1968	Jim Palmer (New Zealand) (4)	McLaren M4A (United Kingdom)
1969	Roly Levis (New Zealand) (2)	Brabham BT23 (United Kingdom)
1970	Graham McRae (New Zealand)	Begg FM2 (New Zealand) / McLaren M10A (United Kingdom)
1971	Graeme Lawrence (New Zealand)	Ferrari Dino 246 (Italy) / Brabham BT29 (United Kingdom)
1972	David Oxton (New Zealand)	Begg FM4 (New Zealand)
1973	David Oxton (New Zealand) (2)	Begg FM5 (New Zealand)
1974	David Oxton (New Zealand) (3)	Begg FM5 (New Zealand)
1975	Graeme Lawrence (New Zealand) (2)	Lola T332 (United Kingdom)
1976	Ken Smith (New Zealand)	Lola T332 (United Kingdom)
1977	Dave McMillan (New Zealand)	Ralt RT1 (United Kingdom)
