= BT-3 =

BT-3 may refer to:

- BT-3, a type of BT tank Soviet light tank
- Brabham BT3, a Formula One racing car
- BT3, a BT postcode area for Belfast

== See also ==
- Dragon Ball Z: Budokai Tenkaichi#Dragon Ball Z: Budokai Tenkaichi 3 (2007)
