= 1947 Championship of New South Wales =

The 1947 Championship of New South Wales was a motor race held at Nowra in New South Wales, Australia on 16 June 1947. It was staged over 25 laps of a circuit, 4 mile and 670 yards in length, laid out on the runways and connecting taxiways of the RAAF aerodrome. The total race distance was approximately 110 miles. The race, which was organised by the Australian Sporting Car Club, was contested on a handicap basis with the three "limit men" starting off a handicap of 24 minutes.

The contest was originally to have been titled the New South Wales Grand Prix however advice was received from the AAA one week before the event informing the organisers that they would not be permitted to use that name.

The race was won by Tom Lancey driving an MG TC.

== Results ==
Pos.	Driver	No.	Car	Handicap	Time / laps	Comment
1	Tom Lancey	34	MG TC	21:30	1:32:20	
2	Bill MacLachlan	22	MG TA Monoposto	14:30	1:27:18	
3	Curley Brydon	30	MG TC	21:30	1:34:26	
4	Dick Bland	10	Ford V8 Special	11:00	1:24:23	
5	Bruce Myers	36	Riley Imp	24:00	1:38:19	
6	Ron Ward	26	MG TB	19:30	1:34:35	
7	Norman Andrews	7	Austin Special	5:00	1:20:41	
8	John Crouch	3	Delahaye 135	3:00	1:20:18	
9	Alf Barrett	1	Alfa Romeo Monza s/c	Scratch	1:17:41	
10	Jack Murray	5	Mackellar Ford s/c	3:00	1:20:42	
11	Alf Najar	9	MG TB s/c	10:00	1:30:34	
12	Bib Stillwell	38	MG L-type Magna	24:00	1:47:23	
NC	Jack Johnson	33	MG TC	21:30	24	Time limit
NC	Gordon Stewart	37	MG L-type Magna	24:00	24	Time limit
NC	Jack Nind	23	MG TB Special	14:30	22	Time limit
DNF	Bill Nunn	25	MG TB	19:30	20	Ignition
DNF	Alby Johnson	32	MG TC	21:30	19	Tyre
DNF	John Snow	2	Dixon Riley	2:00	18	Magnetto
DNF	Bill Patterson	35	MG TC	21:30	16	Big-end
DNF	Alec Mildren	14	Ford V8 Special	12:00	14	Overheating
DNF	Bill Murray	12	Hudson	12:30	12	Big-end
DNF	Hope Bartlett	11	MG TA s/c	12:00	10	Rocker
DNF	John Read	15	Alta Ford	12:30	9	Overheating
DNF	Ted Gray	6	Alfa Romeo Mercury s/c	4:00	7	Overheating
DNF	Ray Mitchell	19	Jeep Ford Special	13:00	7	Blown gasket
DNF	Ced James	29	MG NE Magnette	20:30	4	Brakes
DNF	Tom Sulman	24	Sulman Singer	15:30	3	Spark plug
DNF	Belf Jones	16	Terraplane Special	13:00	2	Safety belt
DNF	Ron Ewing	8	Buick Special	5:00	2	Hit barrier
DNS	Frank Kleinig	4	Hudson Special	3:00	-	Piston
DNS	Lex Davison	13	Mercedes-Benz 38/250 s/c	12:30	-	Pinion / Family issue
DNS	Max Jones	17	Ford Special	13:00	-	
DNS	Walter Mathieson	18	Jaguar SS100	13:00	-	
DNS	Peter Vennermark	20	MG Q-type s/c	13:00	-	
DNS	John Barraclough	21	MG NE Magnette	14:00	-	Distributor
DNS	LJ Duff	27	MG Magnette	20:30	-	Valve seat
DNS	Wally Feltham	28	MG N-type	20:30	-	
DNS	Ron Edgerton	31	MG TC	21:30	-	

=== Notes ===
- Entries: 38
- Attendance: 15,000 (organising club's estimate)
- Fastest lap: Alf Barrett (Alfa Romeo Monza s/c) 2:52 (92.9 mph)
- Fastest time: Alf Barrett (Alfa Romeo Monza s/c) 1:17:41
