= Bib Stillwell =

Australian racing driver

- Nationality: Australian
- Born: Bermar Sellars Stillwell; 31 July 1927 Melbourne, Australia
- Died: 12 June 1999
- Retired: 1965

Australian Drivers' Championship
- Years active: 1957 to 1965
- Best finish: 1st in 1962 Australian Drivers' Championship; 1963 Australian Drivers' Championship; 1964 Australian Drivers' Championship; 1965 Australian Drivers' Championship

Previous series
- 1964-1965: Tasman Series

Championship titles
- 1962 1963 1964 1965 1961 1962 1965: Australian Drivers' Championship; Australian Drivers' Championship; Australian Drivers' Championship; Australian Drivers' Championship; Australian Tourist Trophy; Australian Tourist Trophy; Australian One and a Half Litre Championship

Bermar Sellars "Bib" Stillwell (31 July 1927 – 12 June 1999) was a racing driver who was active in Australian motor racing from 1947 to 1965. He won the Australian Drivers' Championship in each of the four years from 1962 to 1965.

== Racing career ==
Stillwell competed in his first race in 1947 at the Ballarat Airstrip circuit, driving an MG TC. He won the Victorian Trials Championship with the MG in the following year and competed in his first Australian Grand Prix in 1953 at the wheel of an Austin-Healey 100. Stillwell imported a new Jaguar D-Type for 1956 and won the Argus Cup, the SA Trophy and the News South Wales Sports Car Championship in that year. He also placed fifth in the 1956 Australian Tourist Trophy against international opposition. He subsequently raced Maserati, Aston Martin, Cooper and Repco Brabham cars. Stillwell drove an Aston Martin DB4 GT Zagato in the 1961 Le Mans 24 Hour Race with fellow Australian Lex Davison but the car did not finish.

Stillwell won the 1962 Australian Drivers' Championship with a Cooper and the 1963, 1964 and 1965 Australian Drivers' Championships driving Repco Brabhams. He was also victorious in the Australian Tourist Trophy in 1961 and 1962 in a Cooper Monaco and the 1965 Australian One and a Half Litre Championship with a Repco Brabham.

Although he never won an Australian Grand Prix, Stillwell placed second in 1961 and 1964 driving a Cooper and a Repco-Brabham respectively, and third in 1960 and 1962 in Coopers.

Stillwell retired from motor racing at the end of the 1965 season. He later participated in historic races in Australia and the United States.

== Results ==
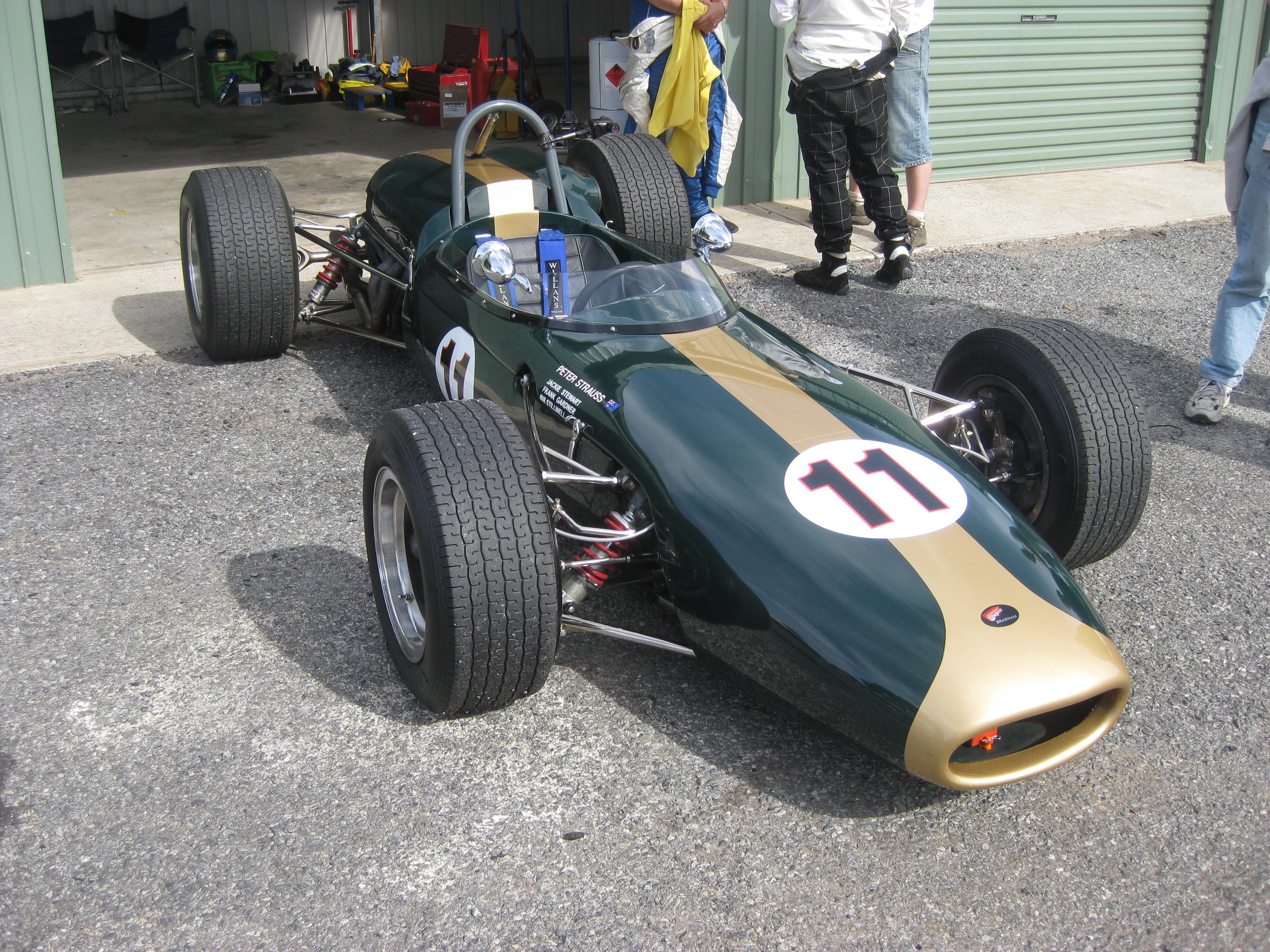
The Repco-Brabham BT11A (pictured in 2012) which Stillwell drove to win the 1965 Australian Drivers' Championship

| Year | Title | Result | Car |
| 1947 | Championship of New South Wales | 12th | MG L-type Magna |
| 1956 | Moomba TT | 2nd | Jaguar D-Type |
| 1956 | Australian Tourist Trophy | 5th | Jaguar D-Type |
| 1958 | Australian Drivers' Championship | 13th | Maserati 250F |
| 1959 | Australian Drivers' Championship | 7th | Cooper T51 Coventry Climax |
| 1960 | Australian Drivers' Championship | 2nd | Cooper T51 Coventry Climax |
| 1961 | Australian Drivers' Championship | 3rd | Cooper T51 Coventry Climax; Cooper T53 Coventry Climax |
| 1961 | Australian Tourist Trophy | 1st | Cooper Monaco Coventry Climax |
| 1962 | Australian Drivers' Championship | 1st | Cooper T53 Coventry Climax |
| 1962 | Australian Tourist Trophy | 1st | Cooper Monaco Coventry Climax |
| 1963 | Australian Drivers' Championship | 1st | Brabham BT4 Coventry Climax |
| 1964 | Tasman Series | 7th | Brabham BT4 Coventry Climax |
| 1964 | Australian Drivers' Championship | 1st | Brabham BT4 Coventry Climax |
| 1965 | Tasman Series | 8th | Brabham BT11A Coventry Climax |
| 1965 | Australian Drivers' Championship | 1st | Brabham BT11A Coventry Climax |
| 1965 | Australian One and a Half Litre Championship | 1st | Brabham BT14 Ford |

=== Complete Tasman Series results ===
| Year | Car | 1 | 2 | 3 | 4 | 5 | 6 | 7 | 8 | Rank | Points |
|---|---|---|---|---|---|---|---|---|---|---|---|
| 1964 | Brabham BT4 | LEV | PUK | WIG | TER | SAN; 2 | WAR; 6 | LAK | LON; 4 | 7th | 10 |
| 1965 | Brabham BT11A | PUK | LEV | WIG | TER | WAR; 4 | SAN; 6 | LON; 6 | | 9th | 5 |

== Business and private life ==
Stillwell opened an automotive dealership selling MGs in 1949 and subsequently obtained a Jaguar franchise. A Holden dealership followed, and was to become one of the largest in the Australia. A switch from Holden to Ford in 1966 was followed by the establishment of Stillwell Aviation in 1967 with distribution rights for Beechcraft and later Learjet aircraft. Stillwell moved to the United States in 1979 to take on the role of vice-president of the Gates Learjet Corporation and went on to become president of the company. He later established luxury car dealerships including a BMW franchise and a Jaguar franchise at Doncaster.

Stillwell was married with five children. His son Michael followed Bib into motorsport, becoming a class front runner in the Australian Touring Car Championship in the 1970s.

Stillwell was awarded an Order of Australia Medal posthumously, in January 2001. The award was bestowed for services to the motor industry, to the aviation industry, to motor sport and to the community.

Sporting positions
| Preceded by Bill Patterson | Winner of the Australian Drivers' Championship; 1962, 1963, 1964 and 1965 | Succeeded by Spencer Martin |
