= 1963 Australian Drivers' Championship =

Motor racing competition

Seasons
- ← 1962 1964 →

The 1963 Australian Drivers' Championship was a CAMS sanctioned national motor racing title for drivers of Formula Libre cars with the championship winner awarded the 1963 CAMS Gold Star. The title was contested over a six-round series:

- Round 1, Australian Grand Prix, Warwick Farm, New South Wales, 10 February
- Round 2, Lakeside International, Lakeside, Queensland, 17 February
- Round 3, South Pacific Gold Star Championship, Longford, Tasmania, 4 March
- Round 4, Victorian Road Racing Championship, Sandown, Victoria, 15 September
- Round 5, Gold Star Championship Race, Mallala, South Australia, 14 October
- Round 6, Horden Trophy, Warwick Farm, New South Wales, 1 December

Championship points were awarded on a 12-7-5-3-2-1 basis at each round to the top six Australians licence holders. Race placings gained by drivers who were not Australian licence holders were disregarded by CAMS when determining placings for points allocation. Each driver could retain points only from the Australian Grand Prix plus his/her best four performances from the other five rounds.

The championship was won by Bib Stillwell driving a Repco Brabham Climax.

== Results ==
Position	Driver	Car	Entrant	War.	Lak.	Lon.	San.	Mal.	War.	Total
1	Bib Stillwell	Repco Brabham Climax	B.S. Stilwell	5	12	12	5	7	(3)	41
2	John Youl	Cooper Climax	John Youl	-	-	7	7	12	12	38
3	David McKay	Repco Brabham	Scuderia Veloce	7	7	-	3	1	7	25
4	Jack Brabham	Repco Brabham BT4 Climax	Ecurie Vitesse	12	-	-	-	-	-	12
=	Lex Davison	Cooper Climax	Ecurie Australie	-	-	-	12	-	-	12
6	Bill Patterson	Cooper Climax	Bill Patterson Motors	-	-	5	-	-	5	10
7	Frank Matich	Elfin Ford	Total Team	3	5	-	-	-	-	8
8	Wally Mitchell	MRD Brabham	East Burwood Car Sales	-	-	-	-	5	-	5
9	Glyn Scott	Lotus 20	G. A. Scott	-	3	-	-	-	-	3
=	Peter Boyd-Squires	Cooper Climax	Peter Boyd-Squires Pty. Ltd.	-	-	3	-	-	-	3
=	Greg Cusack	Repco Brabham & Elfin Ford	Scuderia Veloce	-	-	-	1	-	2	3
=	Pat Hawthorn	Aston Martin	Clayleigh Service Station	-	-	-	-	3	-	3
13	Leo Geoghegan	Lotus 20B Ford	Total Team	2	-	-	-	-	-	2
=	Tony Osborne	Cooper T53 Coventry Climax	A. J. R. Osborne	-	-	-	2	-	-	2
=	Granton Harrison	Elfin 1500	Autocourse Elfin	-	-	-	-	2	-	2
16	Bob Holden	Lynx Peugeot	Killara Motor Garage	1	-	-	-	-	-	1
=	Ken Milburn	Lotus 20 Ford	K. Milburn	-	-	-	-	-	1	1

Note:

- Round 1: Of the 11 finishers, 2nd placed John Surtees, 3rd placed Bruce McLaren, 6th placed Graham Hill & 7th placed Tony Shelley were not eligible to score points
- Round 2: Of the 9 finishers, 1st placed John Surtees, 2nd placed Graham Hill, 4th placed Chris Amon, 6th placed Jim Palmer and 7th placed Tony Shelly were not eligible to score points.
- Round 3: Of the 8 finishers, 1st placed Bruce McLaren, 4th placed Jim Palmer, 6th placed Tony Maggs & 4th placed Chris Amon were not eligible to score points.
