= Lotus 32 =

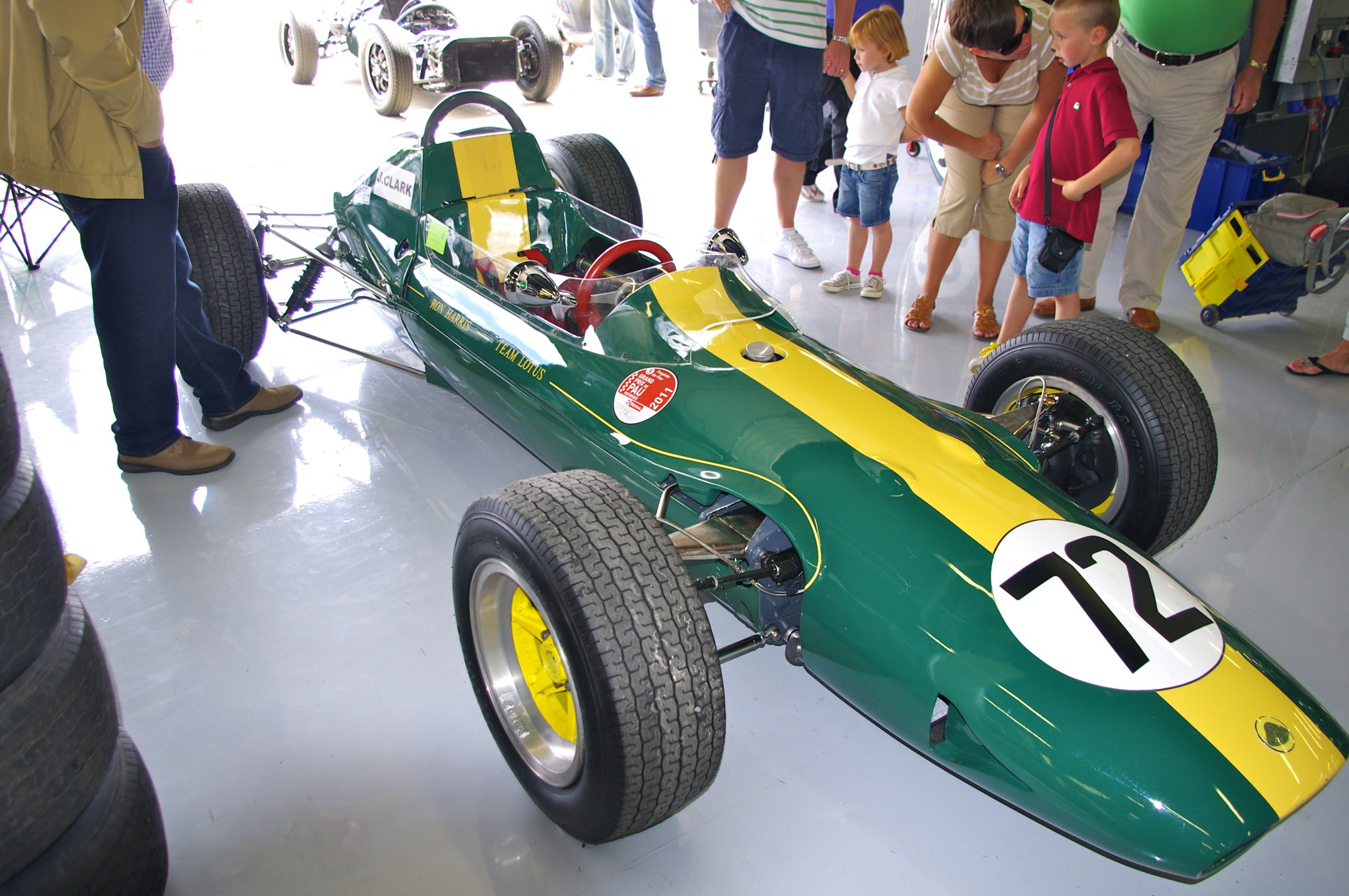
- Lotus 32 at the 2011 Silverstone Classic
- Category: Formula Two
- Constructor: Team Lotus
- Predecessor: Lotus 27
- Successor: Lotus 35

Technical specifications
- Chassis: aluminium monocoque with steel bulkheads and centre section
- Suspension (front): lower wishbones, upper rocker arm with inboard coil springs over dampers
- Suspension (rear): lower reversed wishbone, top link, upper and lower trailing arms, outboard coil springs over dampers
- Engine: Cosworth SCA 998 cc (60.9 cu in) inline 4 naturally aspirated mid-mounted
- Transmission: Hewland Mk.V 5-speed manual gearbox.

Competition history

The Lotus 32 was a Formula 2 racing car built by Team Lotus in 1964. It was developed from the Lotus 27 Formula Junior model. Twelve cars were produced, four of which were run by Ron Harris Team Lotus, whose drivers included Jim Clark and Mike Spence. Spence won the 1964 Autocar British Formula 2 Championship while Clark was fourth in the Trophées de France Championship.

== Development ==
The chassis of the Lotus 32 was an aluminium monocoque with steel front and rear bulkhead and centre section to bring it up to weight. Suspension followed the usual Lotus practice; coil spring/damper units were mounted inboard at the front and outboard at the rear. The front wishbones were slightly wider-based while rear geometry had changed and was fully adjustable, unlike the Lotus 27. The Girling brakes were outboard all round.

The Lotus 32 was powered by the new Cosworth SCA 998 cc engine with twin 40DCM2 Weber carburettors, producing 115 bhp (86 kW) at 8700 rpm. The engine was canted over at an angle of 25 degrees in the chassis and was mated to a Hewland Mk IV five-speed gearbox.

== Race history ==
The Lotus 32 was introduced at the 1964 Pau Grand Prix, where Jim Clark qualified on pole position, set fastest lap and finished first. Despite this auspicious start the rival Brabham BT10 ultimately proved to be the car to beat that year. Clark won three more races, including a second grand slam at the Eifelrennen, and Brian Hart and Jackie Stewart won a race apiece. Mike Spence won the Formula Two class at the BARC Aintree '200', and also won the Autocar British Formula Two Championship. Clark finished fourth in the 1964 Trophées de France Championship.

At the end of the 1964 season, one chassis was fitted with a 2497 cc Climax FPF engine, 4 speed Hewland HD transaxle, and different suspension and wheels. Designated the Lotus 32B, it was driven by Jim Clark in the 1965 Tasman Series, which he duly won. The car remained in New Zealand, being sold to Jim Palmer, who drove it to fourth in the following year's Tasman championship.

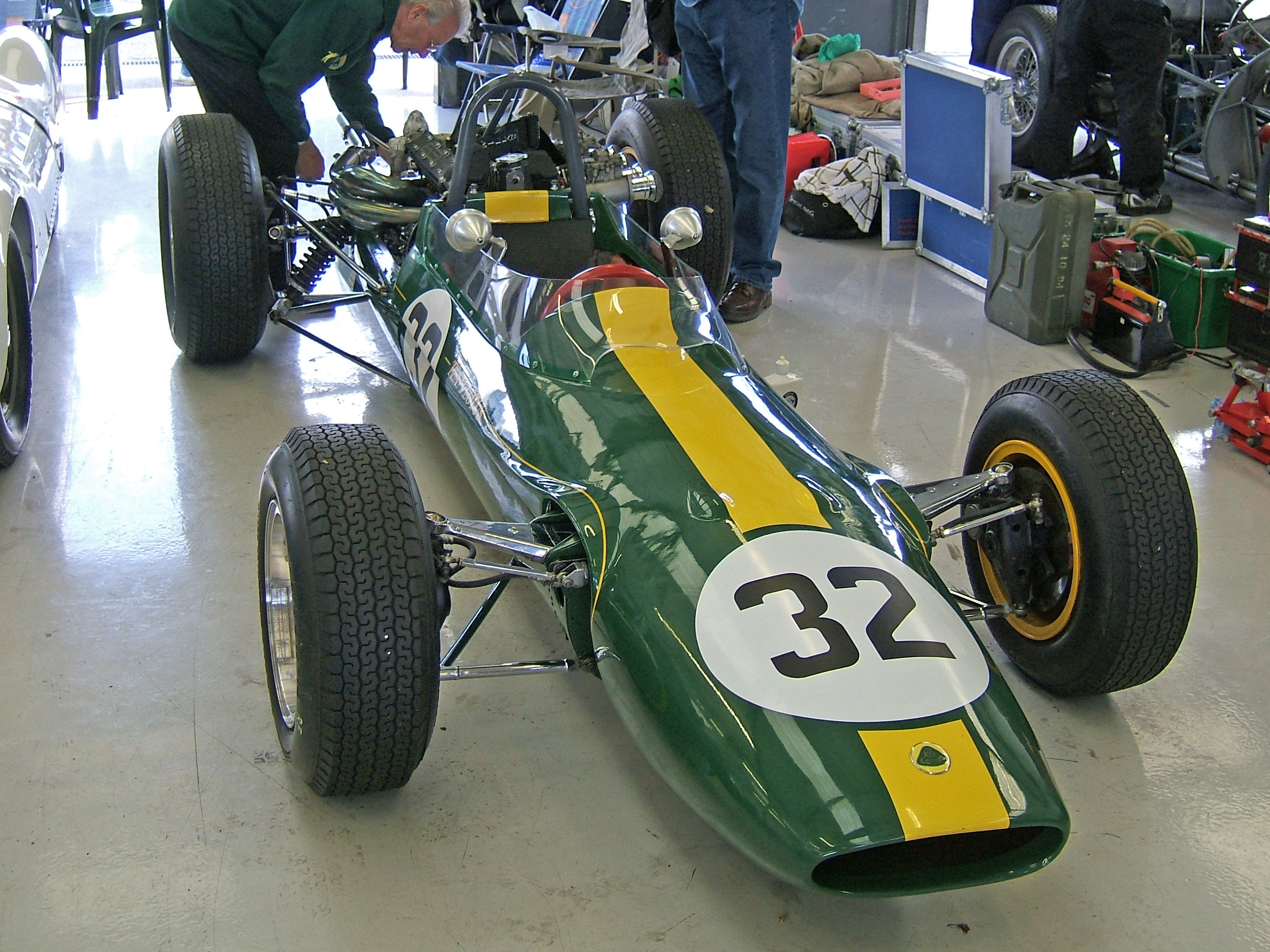
The Lotus 32B, the one-off Tasman Series, 2.5 L variant of the Lotus 32

=== Formula Two wins ===
| Date | Event | Circuit | Entrant | Driver |
|---|---|---|---|---|
| 5 April 1964 | XXIV Grand Prix Automobile de Pau | Pau | Ron Harris - Team Lotus | Jim Clark |
| 18 April 1964 | IX BARC '200' (F2 class) | Aintree | Ron Harris - Team Lotus | Mike Spence |
| 26 April 1964 | XXVII Internationales ADAC-Eifelrennen | Nürburgring Südschleife | Ron Harris - Team Lotus | Jim Clark |
| 17 May 1964 | II Grovewood Trophy | Mallory Park | Ron Harris - Team Lotus | Jim Clark |
| 3 August 1964 | I British Eagle F2 Trophy | Brands Hatch | Ron Harris - Team Lotus | Jim Clark |
| 9 August 1964 | VII Gran Premio di Pergusa | Enna-Pergusa | Ron Harris - Team Lotus | Brian Hart |
| 26 September 1964 | VI Vanwall Trophy | Snetterton | Ron Harris - Team Lotus | Jackie Stewart |

=== Complete Tasman Series results ===
(key) (Races in bold indicate pole position; results in italics indicate fastest lap)

| Year | Entrant | Driver | 1 | 2 | 3 | 4 | 5 | 6 | 7 | 8 | Pos. | Pts |
|---|---|---|---|---|---|---|---|---|---|---|---|---|
| 1965 | Team Lotus | Jim Clark | PUK; Ret | **LEV**; 1 | WIG; 1 | **TER**; 1 | WAR; 1 | SAN; 2 | LON; 5 | **LAK**; 1 | **1st** | **35 (44)** |
| 1966 | Jim Palmer | Jim Palmer | PUK; 3 | LEV (5) | WIG; 3 | TER; 3 | WAR (6) | LAK; 4 | SAN; 4 | LON; 4 | **4th** | **21 (24)** |
