= Jim Palmer (racing driver) =

New Zealand racing driver (born 1942)

- Born: Kenneth James Palmer; 5 January 1942 (age 84) Hamilton, New Zealand
- Retired: 1972

Castrol GTX Championship
- Years active: 1972
- Starts: 1
- Wins: 0
- Poles: 0
- Fastest laps: 0

Previous series
- 1964-68 1970-71 1968 1964-69 1959-62 1959-63 1965 1963 1970: New Zealand Gold Star Championship; NZ Saloon Car Championship; Bathurst 500; Tasman Series; Lady Wigram Trophy; Formula Libre; International 6 Hour Touring Car Race; Wills 6 Hour Saloon Car Race; Benson & Hedges 500 Mile Race

Championship titles
- 1964, 1965, 1966, 1968: New Zealand Gold Star Championship

Awards
- 1964: Wills 6 Hour Saloon Car Race

Kenneth James Palmer (born 5 January 1942) is a New Zealand former racing car driver who raced from 1959 to 1973. Regarded as one of the best racing drivers in his home country, he participated in the Tasman Series for five seasons, reaching a best finish of 4th in 1966 with his eponymous team, racing alongside Formula One drivers such as Graham Hill, Sir Jackie Stewart and Jim Clark. He also won the Gold Star Championship a total four times (1964, 1965, 1966 and 1968) and finished third in the 1963 New Zealand Grand Prix hosted in Pukekohe.

== Career ==
Palmer made his first steps in motorsport at age 17, when he entered the Lady Wigram Trophy in a Lotus Eleven in 1959, finishing 11th. He also participated in Formula Libre races and quickly rose through the ranks: At the 1960 New Zealand Grand Prix, he finished 7th in the Lotus 15, leaving drivers in the likes of Denny Hulme and Sir Stirling Moss behind himself and the same year, he reached 6th in the Lady Wigram Trophy. But despite a troubled 1961 and 1962, he returned to action in 1963, finishing 5th in the local Wills 6 Hour Saloon Car Race and reaching his first-ever podium at the New Zealand Grand Prix in the Cooper T55, again surpassing way more experienced drivers. He then moved on to Australia, but found little success there, returning to his home country the next year with almost instant impact: After finishing 8th in the Tasman Series, he won the Gold Star Championship again in a Cooper and Wills 6 Hours, with the former to be feat he would repeat another three times throughout his career (1965, 1966, 1968). He also would go on to race in the Tasman Series until 1969, showing his unprecedented talent by showing constitent performances and reaching a best finish of 4th in 1966, mostly racing for his own team, Jim Palmer Motor Racing. During his time in the Tasman Series, he also tested a Ferrari he should race at the 1967 edition, but the deal failed. After quitting open-wheel racing, he successfully raced in the Porsche 911 until rule changes ruled it out. After participating in the Castrol GTX Championship in 1972, Palmer quit racing overall.

== Personal life ==
After he quit racing, Palmer opened a car sales yard. He also had three daughters with his wife Judy.
