= Cooper T57 =

Sports racing car

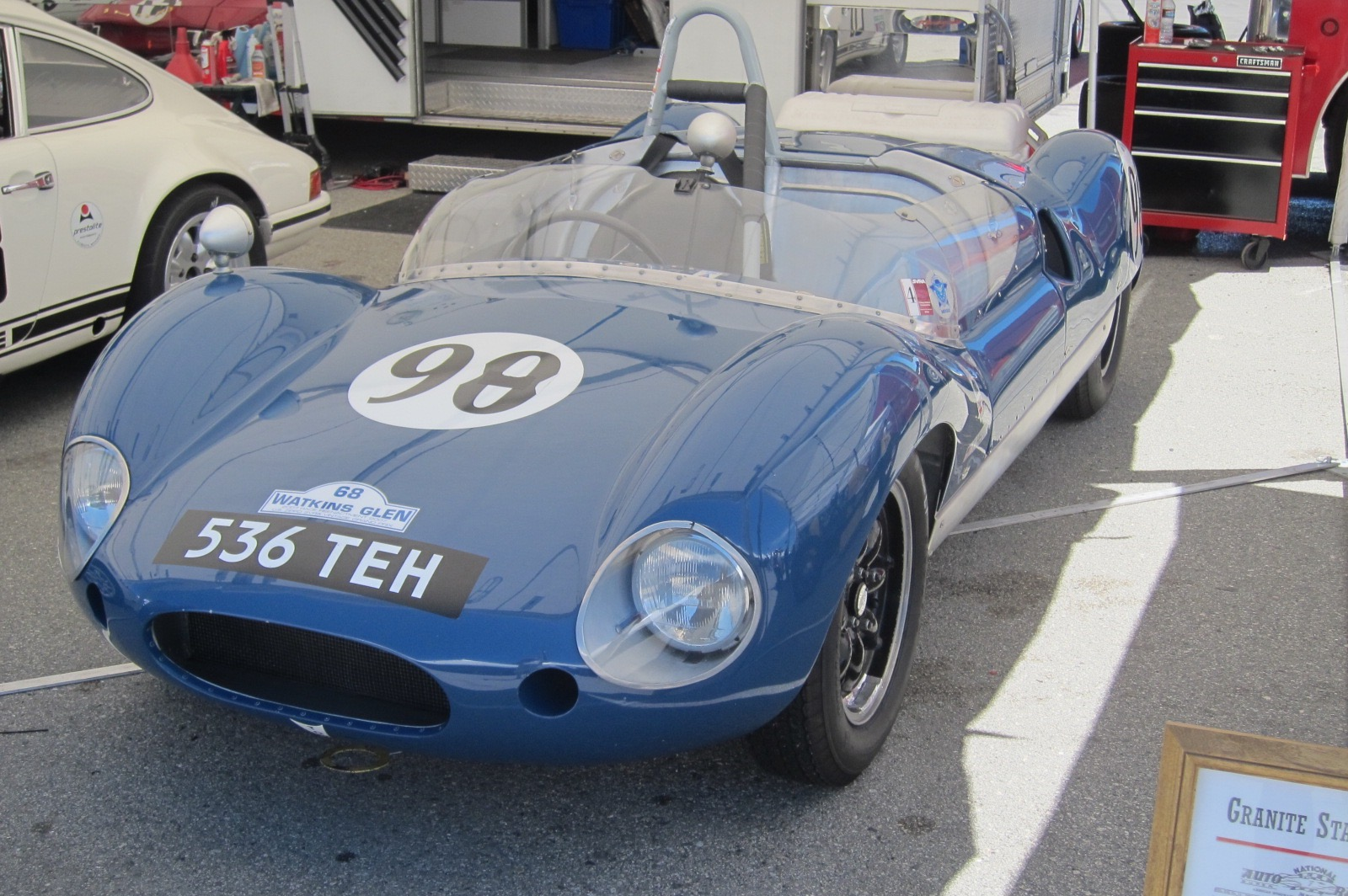
- Category: Group 4
- Constructor: Cooper
- Predecessor: Cooper T49
- Successor: Cooper T61

Technical specifications
- Chassis: Steel-reinforced tubular space frame covered in fiberglass panels
- Length: 141 in (3,600 mm)
- Width: 57.5 in (1,460 mm)
- Height: 33.5 in (850 mm)
- Axle track: Front: 46.5 in (1,180 mm); Rear: 46.5 in (1,180 mm)
- Wheelbase: 91 in (2,300 mm)
- Engine: Mid-engine, longitudinally mounted, 2.7 L (165 cu in), Coventry Climax FPF, I4, NA
- Transmission: 4-speed manual
- Power: 220 hp (160 kW)
- Weight: 1,125 lb (510 kg)

Competition history

The Cooper T57 (Type 57), also known as the Cooper T57 Monaco, or the Cooper Monaco T57, is a sports racing car, designed, developed and built by British manufacturer Cooper, in 1960, and was constructed as the successor model to the T49. It competed in motor racing between 1961 and 1965, and won a total of 26 races (plus 6 additional class wins), scored 43 podium finishes, and clinched 3 pole positions. It was powered by a naturally-aspirated 2.7 L (160 cu in) Coventry Climax FPF four-cylinder engine; producing 220 hp (160 kW), and 200 lb⋅ft (270 N⋅m) of torque.
