= Brabham BT3 =

Formula One racing car

Brabham BT3 Brabham BT4
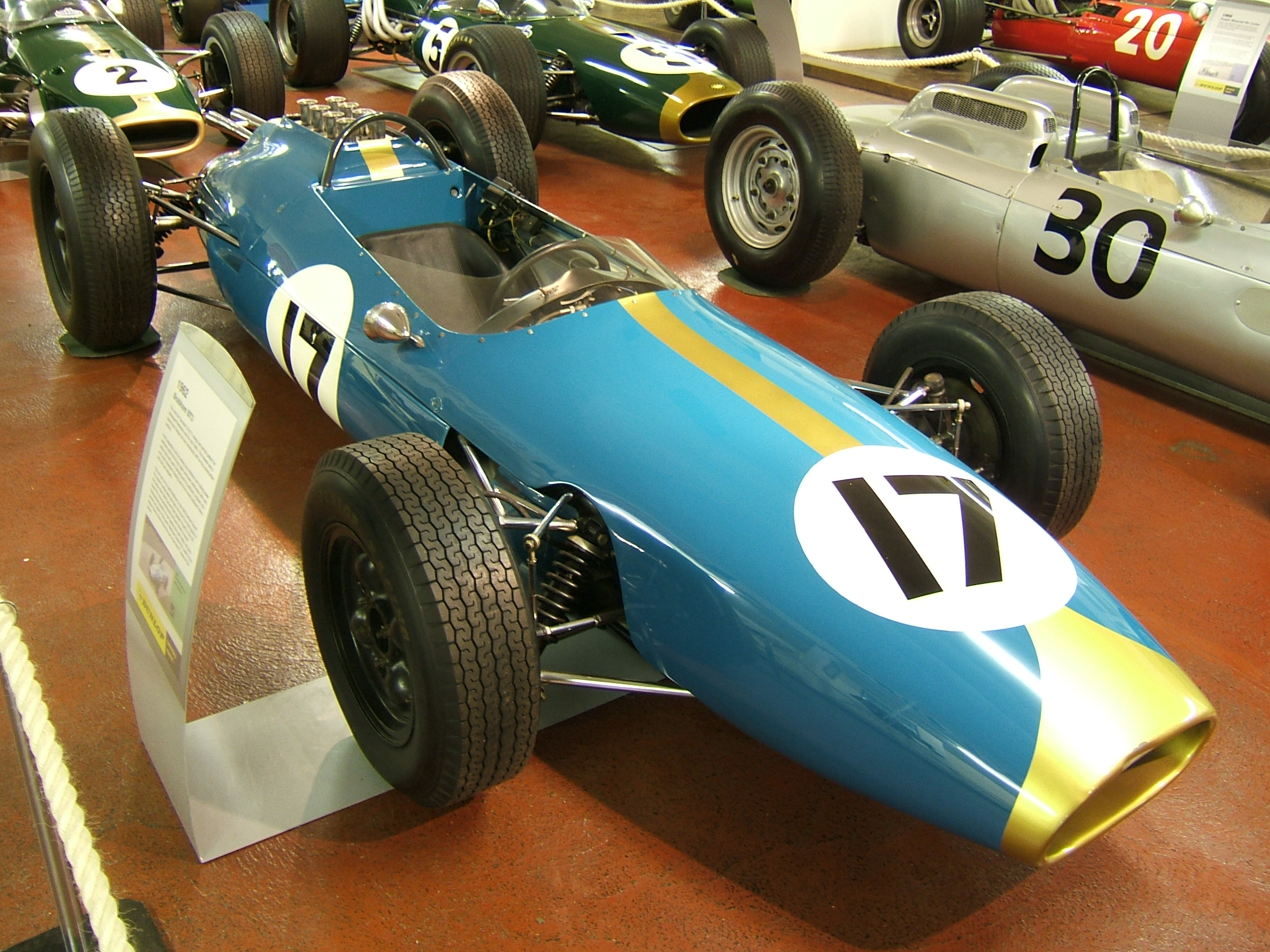
- Category: Formula One
- Constructor: Motor Racing Developments
- Designer: Ron Tauranac
- Successor: Brabham BT7

Technical specifications
- Chassis: Steel spaceframe
- Engine: Coventry Climax FWMV, 1,494 cc (91.2 cu in), 90° V8, naturally aspirated, mid-engine, longitudinally mounted
- Transmission: Francis-Colotti Type-34, 6 speed manual
- Weight: 1,105 lb (501.2 kg)
- Tyres: Dunlop

Competition history
- Notable entrants: Brabham Racing Organisation
- Notable drivers: (Australia) Jack Brabham
- Debut: 1962 German Grand Prix
Races	Wins	Poles	F/Laps
9	0	0	0
- Constructors' Championships: 0
- Drivers' Championships: 0
- Unless otherwise stated, all data refer to Formula One World Championship Grands Prix only.

The Brabham BT3 is a Formula One racing car. It was the first Formula One design to be produced by Motor Racing Developments for the Brabham Racing Organisation, and debuted at the 1962 German Grand Prix. The Brabham BT3 was the vehicle with which team owner – then two-time World Champion – Jack Brabham, became the first driver ever to score World Championship points in a car bearing his own name, at the 1962 United States Grand Prix. The following year Brabham also became the first driver ever to win a Formula One race at the wheel of an eponymous car, again driving the BT3, at the 1963 Solitude Grand Prix. The BT3 design was modified only slightly to form the Tasman Series-specification Brabham BT4 cars.

== Design ==
The BT3's design followed on from Motor Racing Developments' two previous Formula Junior cars. Although the monocoque-chassied Lotus 25 had been introduced by Team Lotus earlier in the 1962 season, designer Ron Tauranac erred on the side of strength and safety in the BT3's design and kept to established Formula One practice in almost all technical specifications. Tauranac based the car around an exceptionally stiff, steel-tubed spaceframe chassis, which he reasoned would be easier to repair than a monocoque, and was closer to what MRD were selling to customers at the time. Also in contrast to Lotus practice were the BT3's internal dimensions, which provided a comparatively comfortable and spacious driving environment for the pilot, with oil and water cooling pipes run outside the cockpit to keep heat to a bearable level. The chassis was clothed in a fibreglass body shell, which was painted in a bright turquoise shade with a metallic gold stripe running down the centre.

Behind the driver, the engine bay was sized to accept Coventry Climax's 1,494 cc (91.2 cu in) FWMV V8 engine, introduced the previous year. Parts of the chassis were removable to allow the engine to fit the narrow chassis. In 1962-specification this engine developed around 157 bhp (117 kW), which increased to around 190 bhp (142 kW) in its 1963 form. Transmission was through an Alf Francis-designed Colotti six-speed gearbox which, although technically advanced, would be the BT3's Achilles heel as it proved to be somewhat fragile. Wheel location was by fully independent double wishbone suspension arrangements at all four corners, with smaller than usual 13 inch wheels. Braking was initially by 9 in (23 cm) diameter disc brakes on each wheel, but these proved insufficient and these were increased to 10.5 in (27 cm) at the front following the car's second race. This also required 15 inch front wheels, which negatively affected the handling.

Only one Formula One specification, FWMV-powered BT3 chassis was produced, numbered F1-1-62, although its design was the template used for the Intercontinental Formula and Tasman Series Brabham BT4 cars, fitted with 2.5 and 2.7-litre Climax FPF inline-four engines. Only minor engine bay modifications, to accommodate the FPF engines, smaller fuel tanks and a switch to conventional 15 in (38 cm) wheels were made between the BT3 and BT4 designs. The BT4 found much favour as a customer car in Australia and New Zealand, with examples sold to Scuderia Veloce and Bib Stillwell for the 1963 season. Lex Davison also later acquired an ex-works BT4.

The BT3 was used as a prototype mule for the development of its Formula One successor, the Brabham BT7, and modifications made prior to the 1963 season included lowering of the chassis, shedding of 55 lb (25 kg) of weight, and a switch in livery to what would become Brabham's racing colours for the remainder of the decade: dark green and gold. At the end of the 1963 season the BT3 was sold to Brighton-based privateer Ian Raby, and he refitted the car with a BRM V8 engine in place of the Climax unit. In turn, when Raby sold BT3 to David Hepworth in 1965, the BRM engine was replaced by a 4.7 L (287 cu in) Chevrolet V8, and the car ran in the Formule Libre class and at hillclimb events during 1966. The unique Brabham BT3 still exists. It was later restored to its original, 1962 Formula One specifications, complete with the correct turquoise-and-gold livery, and for many years resided in the Donington Grand Prix Exhibition museum collection.

== Racing history ==
=== 1962 ===
Up to the introduction of the BT3 the Brabham team used a Lotus 24 car for the early races of the 1962 Formula One season. Brabham and Tauranac had hoped to have the Brabham BT3 ready in time for the 1962 British Grand Prix, but at 3 am the morning before the race it was discovered that they had been supplied with the wrong exhaust system. The car was finished a week later and underwent brief shakedown tests at Goodwood Circuit and Brands Hatch. It was then shipped over to the Nürburgring for its first competitive outing: the 1962 German Grand Prix. However, the BT3's first race appearance was not a success. Following an engine failure in practice Brabham could only qualify in 24th place, using a second-rate spare engine constructed from scavenged components. Following a second engine change overnight – for a properly assembled and tested unit hurriedly flown out directly from the manufacturers – the BT3 ran well for the first few laps of the race. The rushed overnight mechanical work had left the new car with an improvised throttle linkage and after nine laps, of the 15 scheduled, Jack Brabham was having problems applying enough pressure to keep the throttle open. Lacking proper control of the car Brabham retired from the race.

Although Brabham reverted to the team's interim Lotus to win the non-Championship Danish Grand Prix three weeks later, by the time of the Oulton Park International Gold Cup a few days following he was once again driving the new car. After starting fifth on the grid, Brabham rose to third by the final flag – despite having to nurse rapidly wearing brake pads – to take his first podium position in a car bearing his own name. He then sat out the high-speed Italian Grand Prix at Monza later that month, owing to a disagreement with the race promoter regarding starting money, before returning the BT3 to Championship duty to take fourth places at the final two rounds of the season, the 1962 United States and South African Grands Prix, scoring the new marque's first Constructors' Championship points, and the first ever Championship points for a driver in a car carrying his own name. Between these two events Brabham took second position in the inaugural Mexican Grand Prix, the only man to finish on the same lap as eventual joint winners Jim Clark and Trevor Taylor in their Lotus 25.

=== 1963 ===
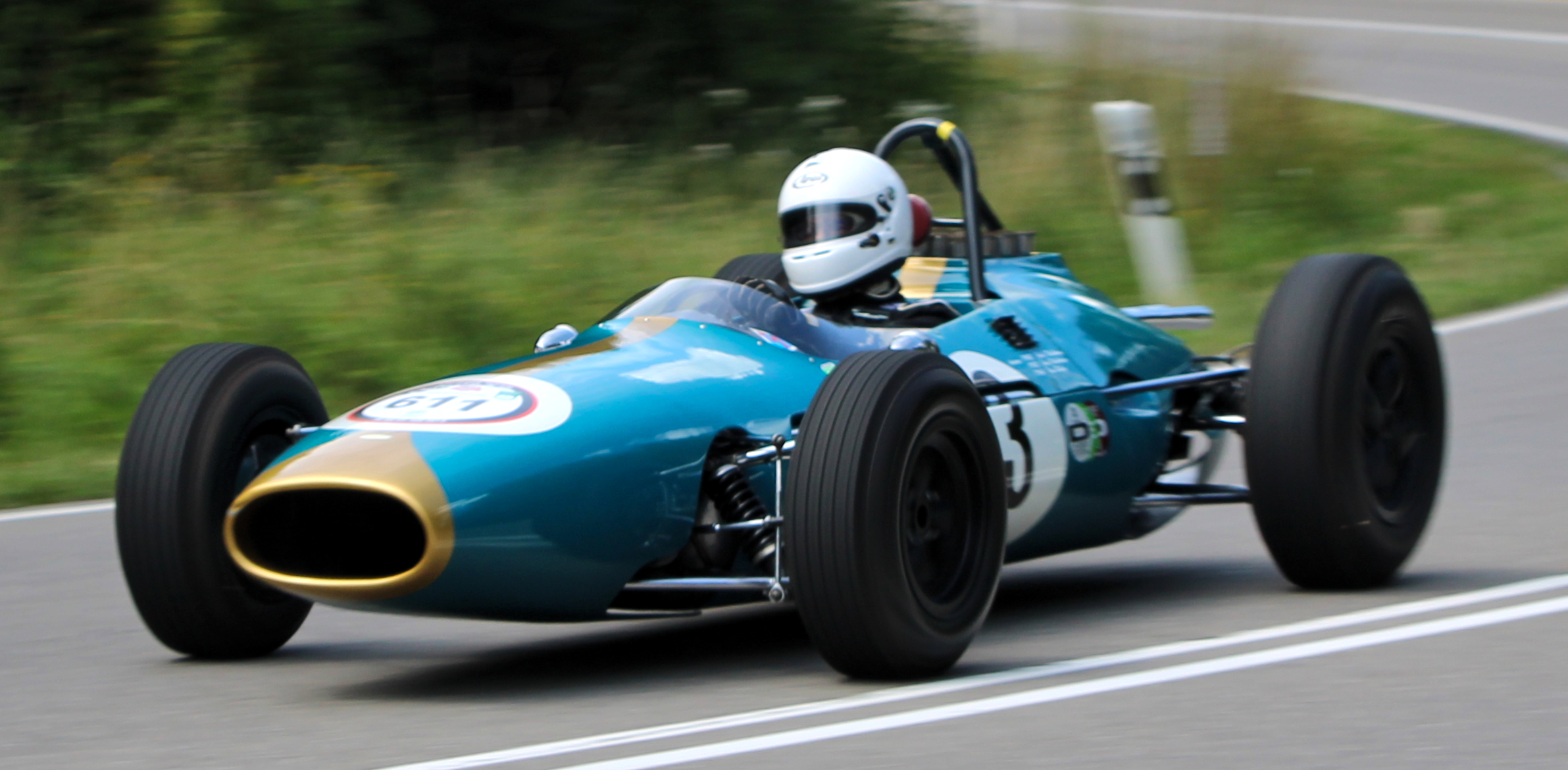
Jack Brabham won the 1963 Solitude Grand Prix in the BT3. This photo was taken in 2019 at the Solitudering, during the Solitude Revival.

Following a sequence of engine failures in their works cars the Brabham team started the 1963 Formula One season with a Lotus 25, borrowed from Team Lotus, alongside their one running MRD design, when the team expanded into a two car operation with the addition of American driver Dan Gurney. The BT3 was replaced for the 1963 Championship season by new Brabham BT7s, although Brabham himself used BT3 for the Championship Belgian and Italian Grands Prix that year when a BT7 chassis was not available. Brabham used BT3 more regularly in non-Championship events, winning both the 1963 Solitude Grand Prix and 1963 Austrian Grand Prix; the first race victories for his eponymous team's own cars, and again the first ever for a driver and car bearing the same name. In the latter, Brabham and the BT3 finished a full five laps ahead of second-placed Tony Settember in his Scirocco-BRM, proving the Brabham's strength and reliability as various Lotus and Cooper challengers succumbed to the Zeltweg Airfield track's rough surface. Between these two victories Brabham loaned the BT3 to his young mechanic and Formula Junior driver, and future Formula One World Champion, Denny Hulme, who took it to fourth place in the 1963 Kanonloppet in Sweden.

=== Post-Brabham ===
Ian Raby continued to enter the now BRM-engined BT3 in occasional races through the 1964 and 1965 Formula One seasons, although without scoring any Championship points. He had provisionally entered the car for the 1965 Italian Grand Prix, but following his failure to qualify for the preceding 1965 German Grand Prix, Raby sold BT3 to future British Hill Climb Champion David Hepworth. Hepworth used the BT3 chassis, now carrying a much larger Chevrolet engine, for a number of hillclimb events in 1966.

After a series of sales and modifications, the BT3 was eventually bought by Tom Wheatcroft, who had it restored to its original specification in 1970. When Wheatcroft opened his Donington Grand Prix Collection museum in 1973 the BT3 was put on display there, where it resided until the museum's closure in 2018.

In the 1964 Tasman Series, Denny Hulme and Graham Hill both scored wins with the BT4.

=== World Championship results ===
(key)

Year	Entrant	Engine	Tyres	Driver	1	2	3	4	5	6	7	8	9	10	Points	WCC
1962	Brabham Racing Organisation	Climax FWMV V8	D		NED	MON	BEL	FRA	GBR	GER	ITA	USA	RSA		6	7th
1962	Brabham Racing Organisation	Climax FWMV V8	D	Jack Brabham						Ret		4	4		6	7th
1963	Brabham Racing Organisation	Climax FWMV V8	D		MON	BEL	NED	FRA	GBR	GER	ITA	USA	MEX	RSA	30^{†}	3rd^{†}
1963	Brabham Racing Organisation	Climax FWMV V8	D	Jack Brabham		Ret					5				30^{†}	3rd^{†}
1964	Ian Raby Racing	BRM P56 V8	D		MON	NED	BEL	FRA	GBR	GER	AUT	ITA	USA	MEX	7^{‡}	6th^{‡}
1964	Ian Raby Racing	BRM P56 V8	D	Ian Raby					Ret			DNQ			7^{‡}	6th^{‡}
1965	Ian Raby Racing	BRM P56 V8	D		RSA	MON	BEL	FRA	GBR	NED	GER	ITA	USA	MEX	5^{‡}	7th^{‡}
1965	Ian Raby Racing	BRM P56 V8	D	Chris Amon					DNS						5^{‡}	7th^{‡}
1965	Ian Raby Racing	BRM P56 V8	D	Ian Raby					11		DNQ	DNA			5^{‡}	7th^{‡}

^{†} Includes 28 points scored by Brabham-Climax BT7 cars.
^{‡} All points scored by Brabham-BRM BT11 cars.
