= Lotus 27 =

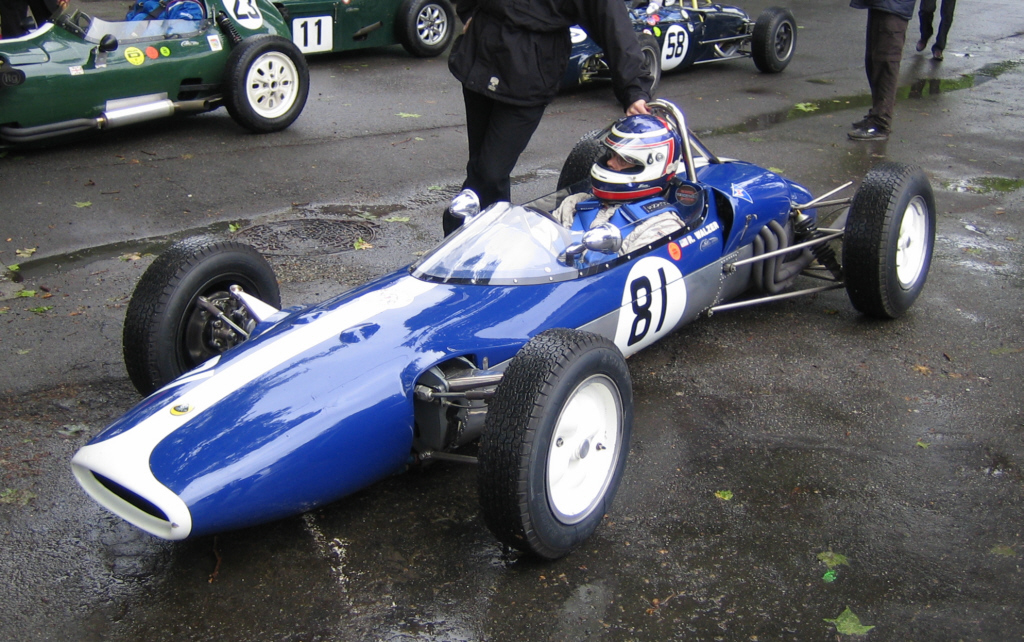

Overview
- Manufacturer: Team Lotus
- Production: 1963

Body and chassis
- Class: Formula Junior
- Body style: Open wheel

Powertrain
- Engine: 1098 cc Cosworth Mk.XI
- Transmission: 5-speed manual Hewland transmission

Chronology
- Predecessor: Lotus 22

The Lotus 27 was a Formula Junior version of the Lotus 25 Formula One car for the 1963 Formula Junior season. Its body was aluminium monocoque with steel bulkheads. It was originally designed with fibreglass sides which led to flexing problems, leading to them being replaced with aluminium.

The Team Lotus cars were run by Ron Harris; and Peter Arundell won the 1963 British championship after the initial flexing problems were solved.
