= 1967 Australian One and a Half Litre Championship =

Australian motor racing competition

The 1967 Australian One and a Half Litre Championship was an Australian motor racing competition for racing cars complying with the Australian 1½ Litre Formula. It was authorised by the Confederation of Australian Motor Sport as an Australian National Title.

The title, which was the fourth Australian One and a Half Litre Championship, was won by Max Stewart, driving a Rennmax BN1 Ford.

== Calendar ==
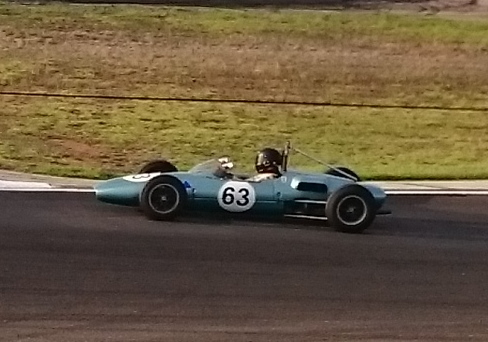
A Rennmax BN1, similar to the car driven by Max Stewart to win the championship. The car is pictured in 2017.

The championship was contested over a six heat series.

Heat	Circuit	Date	Winner	Car
1	Lakeside	25 June	Mike Champion	Repco Brabham BT2 BRM Ford
2	Surfers Paradise	27 August	Graeme Lawrence	Repco Brabham BT18 Ford
3	Sandown Park	17 September	Graeme Lawrence	Repco Brabham BT18 Ford
4	Mallala	9 October	Max Stewart	Rennmax BN1 Ford
5	Symmons Plains	12 November	David Sternberg	Lotus Alexis Mk 6 Ford
6	Warwick Farm	3 December	Phil West	Repco Brabham BT2 Ford

Each heat of the championship was run concurrently with a heat of the 1967 Australian Drivers' Championship. That series was open to cars complying with the Australian National Formula or with the Australian 1½ Litre Formula. The above table lists the Australian 1½ Litre Formula class winners, rather than the outright winners.

New Zealander Graeme Lawrence was not eligible to score championship points as he was not racing with an Australian license.

== Points system ==
Championship points were awarded on a 9,6,4,3,2,1 basis for the first six places in each heat. Only holders of a full General Competition License issued by the Confederation of Australian Motor Sport were eligible. The best five results from the six heats could be retained by each driver.

== Championship standings ==
Position	Driver	Car	Entrant	Lak	Sur	San	Mal	Sym	War	Total
1	Max Stewart	Rennmax BN1 Ford	Max Stewart Motors	6	-	1	9	4	6	26
2	Glyn Scott	Lotus 27 Ford	Glyn Scott Motors	3	9	-	4	-	2	18
3	Garrie Cooper	Elfin Mono Mk 2B Ford	Elfin Sports Cars	2	-	9	3	-	3	17
4	Stan Keen	Elfin Mono Mk 1 Ford	Stan Keen	4	3	4	-	-	-	11
5	Mike Champion	Repco Brabham BT2 BRM Ford	Competition Cars (Australia)	9	-	-	-	-	-	9
=	David Sternberg	Lotus Alexis Mk 6 Ford	David Sternberg	-	-	-	-	9	-	9
=	Phil West	Repco Brabham BT2 Ford	Competition Cars (Australia)	-	-	-	-	-	9	9
8	Brian Page	Elfin Mono Mk 1 Lancia	JP McGuire	-	6	-	-	-	1	7
9	Jack Hunnam	Elfin Mono Mk 2D Ford	Jack Hunnam Motors	-	-	6	-	-	-	6
=	John Walker	Elfin Mono Mk 2B Ford	Gilbert Motor Bodies	-	-	-	6	-	-	6
=	Lyn Archer	Elfin Catalina Ford	Lyn Archer Motors	-	-	-	-	6	-	6
12	Col Green	Elfin Mono Mk 1 Ford	Col Green	-	4	-	-	-	-	4
=	Alfredo Costanzo	Elfin Mono Mk 2B Ford	Alfredo Costanzo	-	-	-	-	-	4	4
14	John Ampt	Elfin Mono Mk 2D Ford	John Ampt	-	-	3	-	-	-	3
=	Clive Millis	Elfin Mono Mk 1 Ford	Merlynston Motors P/L	-	-	2	-	-	-	2
=	Dean Clough	Elfin Mono Mk 1 Ford	Dean Clough	-	-	-	2	-	-	2
17	Ian Ferguson	Lotus 27 Ford	Ian Ferguson	1	-	-	-	-	-	1
=	Bill Seward	Elfin Catalina Ford	Auto-Dyne	-	-	-	1	-	-	1
