= 1966 Australian Drivers' Championship =

Motor racing competition

Seasons
- ← 1965 1967 →

The 1966 Australian Drivers' Championship was a CAMS sanctioned Australian motor racing title for drivers of racing cars complying with either the Australian National Formula or the Australian 1½ Litre Formula. The winner of the title, which was the tenth Australian Drivers' Championship, was awarded the 1966 CAMS Gold Star.

The championship was won by Spencer Martin driving a Repco-Brabham BT11A Coventry Climax for Bob Jane Racing.

== Calendar ==
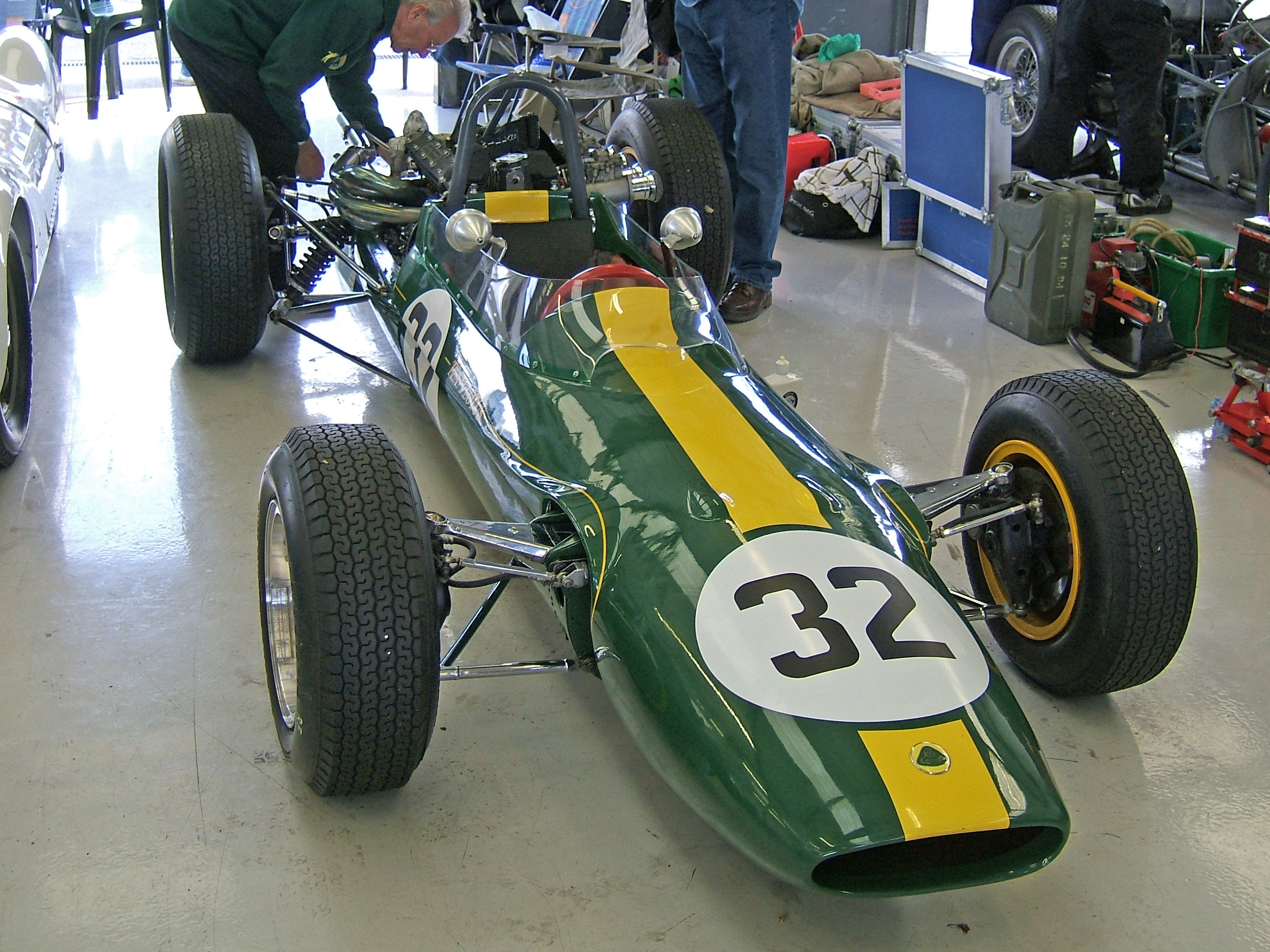
The Lotus 32B with which Greg Cusack won the Examiner 1000 at Symmons Plains

The championship was contested over a six-round series with one race per round.

Round	Race	Circuit	State	Date	Round winner	Car
1	Governor's Trophy	Lakeside	Queensland	10 July	Spencer Martin	Repco Brabham BT11A Coventry Climax
2	Surfers Paradise Trophy	Surfers Paradise	Queensland	14 August	Spencer Martin	Repco Brabham BT11A Coventry Climax
3	Country Club Trophy	Mallala	South Australia	10 October	John Harvey	Repco Brabham BT14 Ford
4	Victorian Trophy	Sandown	Victoria	16 October	Spencer Martin	Repco Brabham BT11A Coventry Climax
5	Examiner 1000	Symmons Plains	Tasmania	13 November	Greg Cusack	Lotus 32B Coventry Climax
6	Hordern Trophy	Warwick Farm	New South Wales	4 December	Kevin Bartlett	Repco Brabham BT11A Coventry Climax

Each round also incorporated a round of the 1966 Australian One and a Half Litre Championship.

== Points system ==
Championship points were awarded on a 9-6-4-3-2-1 basis to the first six finishers in each round. Only the best five round results could be obtained by each driver.

The championship was open to holders of a General Competition License issued by CAMS.

== Results ==
Position	Driver	Car	Entrant	Lak.	Sur.	Mal.	San.	Sym.	War.	Total
1	Spencer Martin	Repco-Brabham BT11A Coventry Climax	Bob Jane Racing	9	9	-	9	-	6	33
2	John Harvey	Repco-Brabham BT14 Ford	RC Phillips	4	(1)	9	3	6	4	26
3	Kevin Bartlett	Repco-Brabham BT11A Coventry Climax	Alec Mildren Racing	6	-	-	6	-	9	21
4	Greg Cusack	Lotus 32B Coventry Climax	Castrol Team	-	4	-	-	9	3	16
5	Mike Champion	Repco-Brabham BT2 Ford	Competition Cars	-	-	6	2	-	2	10
6	John MacDonald	Cooper T70 Coventry Climax	Bill Patterson Motors	-	3	-	4	-	-	7
7	Leo Geoghegan	Lotus 39 Coventry Climax	Total Team	-	6	-	-	-	-	6
8	Garrie Cooper	Elfin Mono Mk2B Ford	Elfin Sports Cars	3	2	-	-	-	-	5
8	Mel McEwin	Elfin Mono Mk1 Ford	Mel McEwin	2	-	-	-	3	-	5
10	Jack Hunnam	Elfin Mono Mk1 Ford	Jack Hunnam Motors	-	-	4	-	-	-	4
10	John McCormack	Repco-Brabham BT4 Coventry Climax	J McCormack	-	-	-	-	4	-	4
12	Stan Keen	Elfin Mono Mk1 Ford	Stan Keen	-	-	3	-	-	-	3
12	Glyn Scott	Lotus 27 Ford	Glyn Scott Motors	-	-	-	-	2	1	3
14	Dean Rainsford	Elfin Catalina Ford	Tudor Accessories	-	-	2	-	-	-	2
15	Ian Ferguson	Elfin Catalina Ford	Ian Ferguson	1	-	-	-	-	-	1
15	Jim Orr	Austin Special	Jim Orr	-	-	1	-	-	-	1
15	Bob Jane	Elfin Mono Mk1 Ford	Bob Jane Racing	-	-	-	1	-	-	1
15	Lyn Archer	Elfin Catalina Ford	L Archer Motors	-	-	-	-	1	-	1

Note:

- Kerry Grant placed sixth at Lakeside however the New Zealand driver was not awarded championship points.
- Roly Levis placed sixth at Surfers Paradise however the New Zealand driver was not awarded championship points.
- Frank Gardner (Repco-Brabham) won the Hordern Trophy but was not awarded championship points as he was not classified as an "Australian Resident".
