= 1968 Australian One and a Half Litre Championship =

The 1968 Australian One and a Half Litre Championship was a CAMS sanctioned motor racing title for drivers of Australian 1½ Litre Formula racing cars. It was the fifth and final Australian One and a Half Litre Championship to be awarded prior to the demise of the formula at the end of 1968.

== Calendar ==
The title was contested over a six heat series, run concurrently with the 1968 Australian Drivers' Championship.

- Heat 1, Bathurst Gold Star Trophy, Mount Panorama, Bathurst, New South Wales, 15 April
- Heat 2, Governor's Trophy, Lakeside, Queensland, 28 July
- Heat 3, Rothman's Trophy, Surfers Paradise, Queensland, 24 August
- Heat 4, Lombard (Aust.) Victoria Trophy, Sandown Park, Victoria, 15 September
- Heat 5, Advertiser Trophy, Mallala, South Australia, 14 October
- Heat 6, Hordern Trophy, Warwick Farm, New South Wales, 1 December

== Points system ==
Championship points were awarded on a 9-6-4-3-2-1 basis to the drivers of the six best placed Australian 1½ Litre Formula cars at each heat. The best five results from the six heats could be retained by each driver.

== Results ==
Position	Driver	Car	Entrant	H1	H2	H3	H4	H5	H6	Total
1	Max Stewart	Rennmax BN2 Ford	Max Stewart Motors	9	-	9	-	6	-	24
1	Garrie Cooper	Elfin 600B Ford	Elfin Sports Cars	-	-	-	9	9	6	24
3	Ian Fergusson	Lotus 27 Ford	Ian Fergusson	6	9	-	-	-	-	15
4	John Walker	Elfin Mono Mk2C Ford	Gilbert Motor Bodies	-	-	4	-	-	9	13
5	Michael Aldred	MRC Lotus 22 Ford	Motor Racing Components	-	6	6	-	-	-	12
6	Brian Page	Repco Brabham BT2 Ford	Brian Page	4	3	-	-	3	-	10
6	John Ampt	Elfin Mono Mk2D Ford	John Ampt	-	-	-	6	4	-	10
8	Clive Millis	Elfin Mono Mk1 Ford	Merlynston Motors	-	-	-	4	-	4	8
9	Alton Boddenberg	Lotus 32 Ford	Alton Boddenberg	-	4	-	-	-	-	4
9	Alfredo Costanzo	Elfin Mono Mk2B Ford	Maranello Motors	3	1	-	-	-	-	4
9	Jeff Thompson	Lotus 20b Ford	Motor Racing Components	-	2	2	-	-	-	4
9	Kelvin Munyard	Elfin Mono Mk1 Ford	Kelvin Munyard	-	-	1	-	-	3	4
13	Ivan Tighe	Elfin Mono Mk2D Ford	Ivan Tighe	-	-	3	-	-	-	3
13	Maurie Quincey	Elfin 600B Mazda	Maurie Quincey	-	-	-	3	-	-	3
15	Col Green	Elfin Mono Mk1 Ford	Col Green	2	-	-	-	-	-	2
15	Dean Clough	Elfin Mono Mk1 Ford	Elfin Sports Cars	-	-	-	-	2	-	2
17	Malcolm Bailey	Elfin Catalina Peugeot	Malcolm Bailey	1	-	-	-	-	-	1
