= 1966 Australian One and a Half Litre Championship =

The 1966 Australian One and a Half Litre Championship was a CAMS sanctioned Australian motor racing title for Racing Cars complying with the Australian 1½ Litre Formula. It was the third Australian One and a Half Litre Championship and the first to be contested over a series of heats rather than as a single race. The championship was won by John Harvey, driving a Repco Brabham BT14 Ford.

== Calendar ==
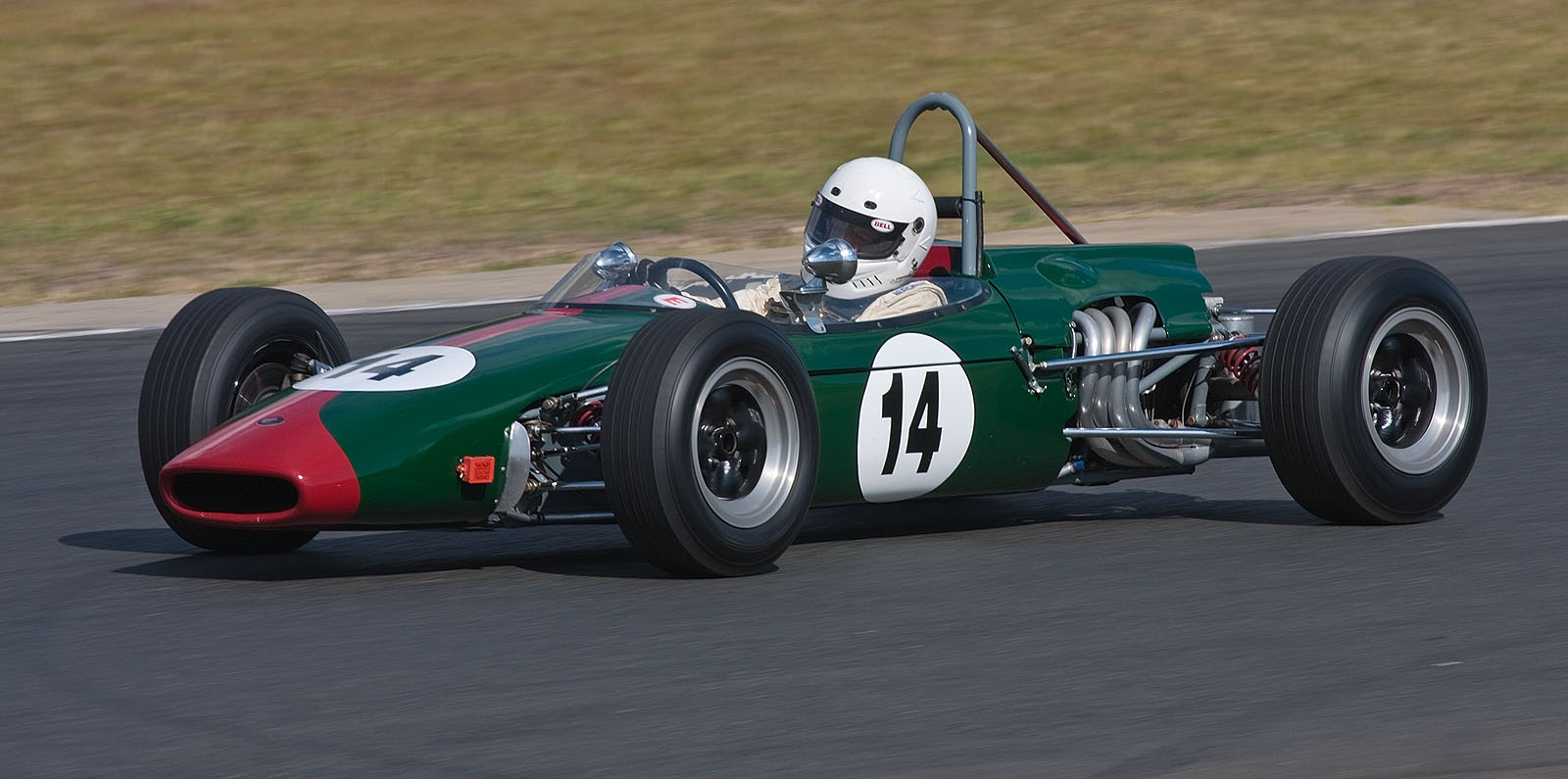
John Harvey won the championship driving a Repco Brabham BT14, similar to the example pictured above in 2009

The championship was contested over a seven heat series.

Heat	Circuit	State	Date	Winner	Car	Heat Format
1	Mallala	South Australia	13 June	Mel McEwin	Elfin Mono Mk1 Ford	Stand alone race for Australian 1½ Litre Formula cars
2	Lakeside	Queensland	10 July	John Harvey	Repco Brabham BT14 Ford	Run concurrently with Race 1 of the 1966 Australian Championship for Drivers
3	Surfers Paradise	Queensland	14 August	Garrie Cooper	Elfin Mono Mk2B Ford	Run concurrently with Race 2 of the 1966 Australian Championship for Drivers
4	Mallala	South Australia	10 October	John Harvey	Repco Brabham BT14 Ford	Run concurrently with Race 3 of the 1966 Australian Championship for Drivers
5	Sandown Park	Victoria	16 October	John Harvey	Repco Brabham BT14 Ford	Run concurrently with Race 4 of the 1966 Australian Championship for Drivers
6	Symmons Plains	Tasmania	13 November	Mel McEwin	Elfin Mono Mk1 Ford	Run concurrently with Race 5 of the 1966 Australian Championship for Drivers
7	Warwick Farm	New South Wales	4 December	Mike Champion	Repco Brabham BT2 Ford	Run concurrently with Race 6 of the 1966 Australian Championship for Drivers

== Points system ==
Championship points were awarded on a 9,6,4,3,2,1 basis for the first six places in each heat. Only holders of a full General Competition Licence issued by CAMS were eligible. The best six results from the seven heats could be retained by each driver. Ties were determined by the relevant places gained by drivers in the 1st Heat and then, where necessary, by the number of first places won, then the number of second places and so on.

== Championship results ==
Position	Driver	Car	Entrant	Mal	Lak	Sur	Mal	San	Sym	War	Total
1	John Harvey	Repco Brabham BT14 Ford	RC Phillips	6	9	4	9	9	-	-	37
2	Mel McEwin	Elfin Mono Mk1 Ford	Mel McEwin	9	4	-	-	-	9	3	25
3	Mike Champion	Repco Brabham BT2 Ford	Competition Cars	2	-	-	6	6	-	9	23
4	Garrie Cooper	Elfin Mono Mk2B Ford	Elfin Sports Cars	-	6	9	-	-	-	-	15
5	Glynn Scott	Lotus 27 Ford	Glyn Scott Motors	-	-	-	-	-	6	6	12
6	Bob Jane	Elfin Mono Mk1 Ford	Bob Jane Racing	4	-	-	-	4	-	-	8
7	Jack Hunnam	Elfin Mono Mk1 Ford	Jack Hunnam Motors	-	-	-	4	3	-	-	7
8	Roly Levis	Repco Brabham BT6 Ford	Roly Levis	-	-	6	-	-	-	-	6
9	Lyn Archer	Elfin Catalina Ford	Lyn Archer Motors	-	-	-	-	-	4	-	4
=	Bob Young	Lotus 22 Ford	Dick Swanston Pty Ltd	-	-	-	-	-	-	4	4
11	Les Howard	Lotus 27 Ford	Howard & Sons	3	-	-	-	-	-	-	3
12	Dean Clough	Elfin Mono Mk1 Ford	Auto Conversions & Elfin Sports Cars	1	-	-	-	2	-	-	3
13	Ian Fergusson	Elfin Catalina Ford	Ian Fergusson	-	3	-	-	-	-	-	3
=	Stan Keen	Elfin Mono Mk1 Ford	Stan Keen	-	-	-	3	-	-	-	3
15	Dean Rainsford	Elfin Catalina Ford	Tudor Accessories	-	-	-	2	1	-	-	3
16	Jimmy Orr	Austin Special	Jimmy Orr	-	-	-	1	-	-	-	1
