= 1967 Tasman Series =

Motorsport series in Australia and New Zealand

The 1967 Tasman Series was a motor racing competition open to racing cars complying with the Tasman Formula. Officially known as the Tasman Championship for Drivers, it was organised by the Motorsport Association, New Zealand Inc. and the Confederation of Australian Motor Sport and was contested over six races in New Zealand and Australia between 7 January and 6 March 1967.

The series, which was the fourth annual Tasman Series, was won by Jim Clark driving a Lotus 33.

== Races ==
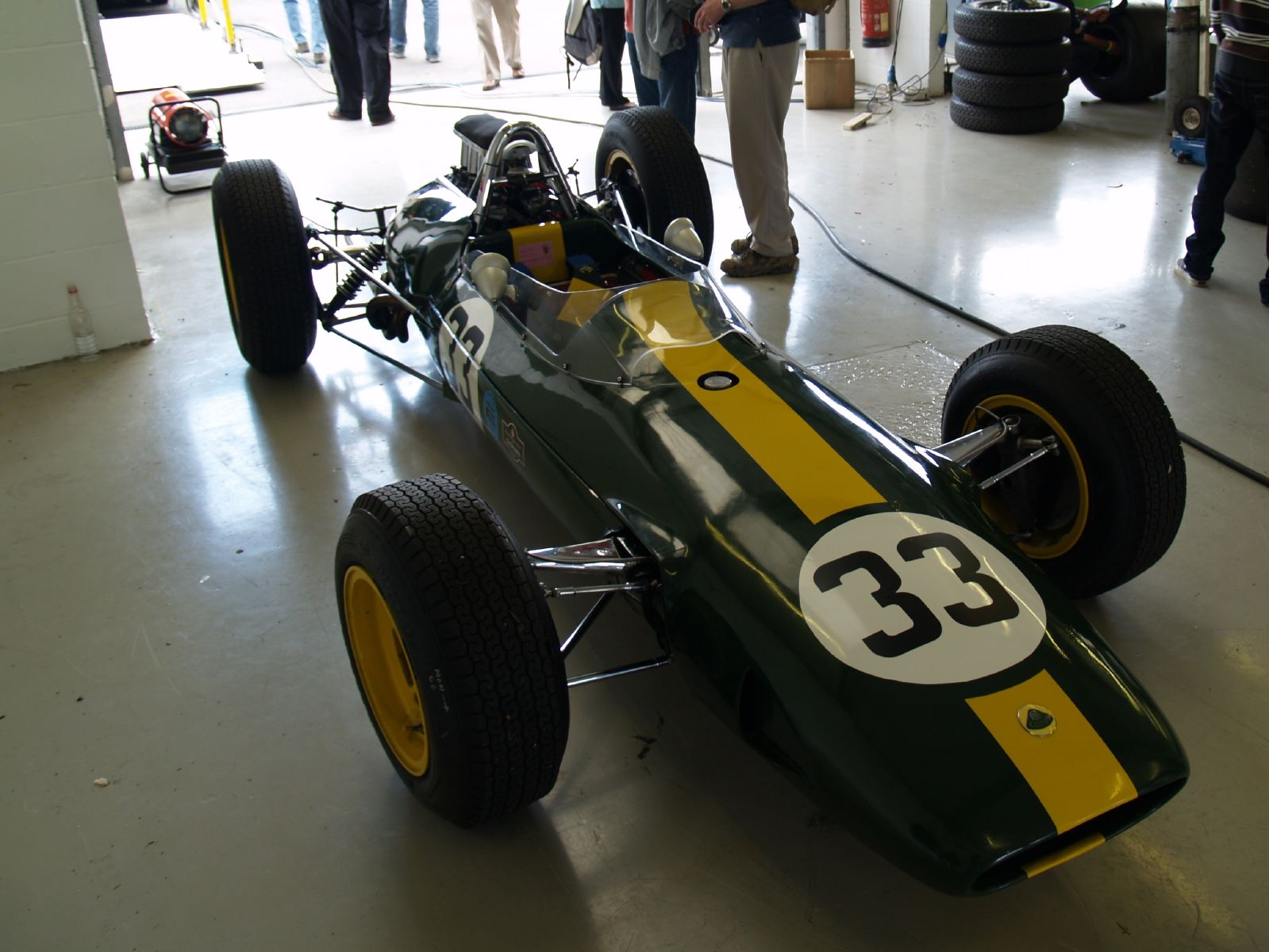
Jim Clark won the 1967 Tasman Series driving a Lotus 33, similar to the example shown above

The series was contested over six races with two additional races at Levin and Teretonga not counting for points.

| Round | | Name | Circuit | Date | Winning driver | Car | Entrant | Report |
|---|---|---|---|---|---|---|---|---|
| New Zealand | 1 | New Zealand Grand Prix | Pukekohe | 7 January | (United Kingdom) Jackie Stewart | BRM P261 | Owen Racing Organisation | Report |
| New Zealand | | Levin International | Levin | 14 January | (United Kingdom) Jim Clark | Lotus 33 Coventry Climax | Team Lotus (Overseas) Ltd | Report |
| New Zealand | 2 | Lady Wigram Trophy | Wigram | 21 January | (United Kingdom) Jim Clark | Lotus 33 Coventry Climax | Team Lotus (Overseas) Ltd | Report |
| New Zealand | | Teretonga International | Teretonga | 28 January | (United Kingdom) Jim Clark | Lotus 33 Coventry Climax | Team Lotus (Overseas) Ltd | Report |
| Australia | 3 | Eagers-Craven Filter Lakeside International 99 | Lakeside | 12 February | (United Kingdom) Jim Clark | Lotus 33 Coventry Climax | Team Lotus (Overseas) Ltd | Report |
| Australia | 4 | Australian Grand Prix | Warwick Farm | 19 February | (United Kingdom) Jackie Stewart | BRM P261 | Owen Racing Organisation | Report |
| Australia | 5 | Sandown International | Sandown | 26 February | (United Kingdom) Jim Clark | Lotus 33 Coventry Climax | Team Lotus (Overseas) Ltd | Report |
| Australia | 6 | South Pacific Trophy | Longford | 6 March | (Australia) Jack Brabham | Repco Brabham BT23A | Ecurie Vitesse | Report |

== Points system ==
Points were awarded at each race as shown in the following table:

| Position | 1 | 2 | 3 | 4 | 5 | 6 |
|---|---|---|---|---|---|---|
| Points | 9 | 6 | 4 | 3 | 2 | 1 |

All points scored were counted.

== Series standings ==
| Pos | Driver | Car | Entrant | Puk | Wig | Lak | War | San | Lon | Pts |
|---|---|---|---|---|---|---|---|---|---|---|
| 1 | (United Kingdom) Jim Clark | Lotus 33 Coventry Climax | Team Lotus (Overseas) Ltd | 2 | 1 | 1 | 2 | 1 | 2 | 45 |
| 2 | (United Kingdom) Jackie Stewart | BRM P261 | Owen Racing Organisation | 1 | Ret | Ret | 1 | Ret | Ret | 18 |
| = | (Australia) Jack Brabham | Repco Brabham BT22; Repco Brabham BT23A | Jack Brabham Racing; Ecurie Vitesse | Ret | 13 | 2 | 4 | NC | 1 | 18 |
| = | (Australia) Frank Gardner | Repco Brabham BT16 Coventry Climax | Alec Mildren Racing Pty Ltd | DNS | 4 | 3 | 3 | 3 | 4 | 18 |
| 5 | (United Kingdom) Richard Attwood | BRM P261 | Owen Racing Organisation | 3 | 2 | | | | | 10 |
| 6 | (Australia) Kevin Bartlett | Repco Brabham BT11A Coventry Climax | Alec Mildren Racing Pty Ltd | Ret | 5 | 5 | 6 | 5 | 5 | 9 |
| 7 | (Australia) Leo Geoghegan | Lotus 39 Coventry Climax | Geoghegan Racing Division | | | Ret | 5 | 2 | DNS | 8 |
| 8 | (New Zealand) Denny Hulme | Repco Brabham BT7A Coventry Climax; Repco Brabham BT22 | FH Stanton; Jack Brabham Racing; Ecurie Vitesse | Ret | 3 | 4 | Ret | Ret | Ret | 7 |
| = | (United Kingdom) Chris Irwin | BRM P261 | Owen Racing Organisation | | | | Ret | 4 | 3 | 7 |
| 10 | (New Zealand) Jim Palmer | Repco Brabham BT22 Coventry Climax | Jim Palmer Motor Racing | 4 | Ret | | | | | 3 |
| = | (Australia) John Harvey | Repco Brabham BT14 Ford | RC Phillips Sports Car World Pty Ltd | | | 6 | DNS | 6 | 6 | 3 |
| 12 | (New Zealand) Graeme Lawrence | Repco Brabham BT14 Ford | Lawrence Motors | 5 | 12 | | | | | 2 |
| 13 | (New Zealand) Dene Hollier | Lotus 27 Ford | Dene Hollier Ltd | 6 | Ret | | | | | 1 |
| = | (New Zealand) Roly Levis | Repco Brabham BT14 Ford | Levis Racing Team | 9 | 6 | | | | | 1 |
| — | (New Zealand) Jim Boyd | Repco Brabham BT4 Coventry Climax | SH Jensen | 7 | 7 | | | | | 0 |
| — | (New Zealand) Bill Stone | Repco Brabham BT6 Ford | Levis Racing Team | 8 | 8 | | | | | 0 |
| — | (New Zealand) Ken Sager | Repco Brabham BT16 Ford | JH Sager | 10 | | | | | | 0 |
| — | (New Zealand) Laurence Brownlie | Repco Brabham BT6 Ford | | 11 | DNS | | | | | 0 |
| — | (New Zealand) John Weston | Repco Brabham BT2 Ford | | 12 | 11 | | | | | 0 |
| — | (New Zealand) Don MacDonald | Repco Brabham BT10 Ford | | 13 | Ret | | | | | 0 |
| — | (New Zealand) Grahame Harvey | Repco Brabham BT6 Ford | | Ret | 10 | | | | | 0 |
| — | (New Zealand) Ken Smith | Lotus 22 Ford | | Ret | | | | | | 0 |
| — | (New Zealand) Pat McLoughlin | Cooper T53 Coventry Climax | | Ret | | | | | | 0 |
| — | (New Zealand) Dennis Marwood | Cooper T66 Coventry Climax | Ecurie Rothmans | Ret | Ret | | | | | 0 |
| — | (New Zealand) Red Dawson | Repco Brabham BT7A Coventry Climax | | DNS | 9 | | | | | 0 |
| — | (New Zealand) Kerry Grant | Repco Brabham BT11A Coventry Climax | Grant & Liddle | DNS | | | | | | 0 |
| — | (New Zealand) Peter Yock | Repco Brabham BT6 Ford | | | DNQ | | | | | 0 |
| — | (Australia) Paul Bolton | Repco Brabham BT7A Coventry Climax | Stanton Motors | | DNQ | | Ret | DNS | | 0 |
| — | (Australia) Glyn Scott | Lotus 27 Ford | Glyn Scott Motors | | | 7 | 7 | 8 | | 0 |
| — | (Australia) Mel McEwin | Elfin Mono Ford | M McEwin | | | 8 | Ret | Ret | | 0 |
| — | (United Kingdom) Piers Courage | BRM P261 | Owen Racing Organisation | | | Ret | | | | 0 |
| — | (Australia) Spencer Martin | Repco Brabham BT11A Coventry Climax | Bob Jane Racing Team | | | Ret | Ret | Ret | Ret | 0 |
| — | (Australia) Greg Cusack | Lotus 32B Coventry Climax | Castrol Team | | | Ret | | | | 0 |
| — | (Australia) Ian Cook | Elfin Mono MkIIB Ford | I Cook | | | Ret | Ret | 7 | | 0 |
| — | (Australia) Mike Champion | Repco Brabham BT2 Ford | Competition Cars Australia | | | | 8 | | | 0 |
| — | (United Kingdom) Graham Hill | Lotus 48 Ford Cosworth FVA | Team Lotus (Overseas) Ltd | | | | Ret | | | 0 |
| — | (Australia) Peter Macrow | Cheetah Mk3 Ford | RP Creed | | | | | NC | | 0 |
| — | (Australia) Jack Hunnam | Elfin Mono MkIID Ford | Jack Hunnam Motors | | | | | Ret | | 0 |
| Pos | Driver | Car | Entrant | Puk | Wig | Lak | War | San | Lon | Pts |

| Colour | Result |
|---|---|
| Gold | Winner |
| Silver | Second place |
| Bronze | Third place |
| Green | Points classification |
| Blue | Non-points classification |
| Blue | Non-classified finish (NC) |
| Purple | Retired, not classified (Ret) |
| Red | Did not qualify (DNQ) |
| Red | Did not pre-qualify (DNPQ) |
| Black | Disqualified (DSQ) |
| White | Did not start (DNS) |
| White | Withdrew (WD) |
| White | Race cancelled (C) |
| Blank | Did not practice (DNP) |
| Blank | Did not arrive (DNA) |
| Blank | Excluded (EX) |
