= Spencer Martin =

Spencer Martin may refer to:

- Spencer Martin (racing driver) (born 1940), Australian racing driver
- Spencer Martin (ice hockey) (born 1995), Canadian ice hockey goaltender
