= 1964 Australian One and a Half Litre Championship =

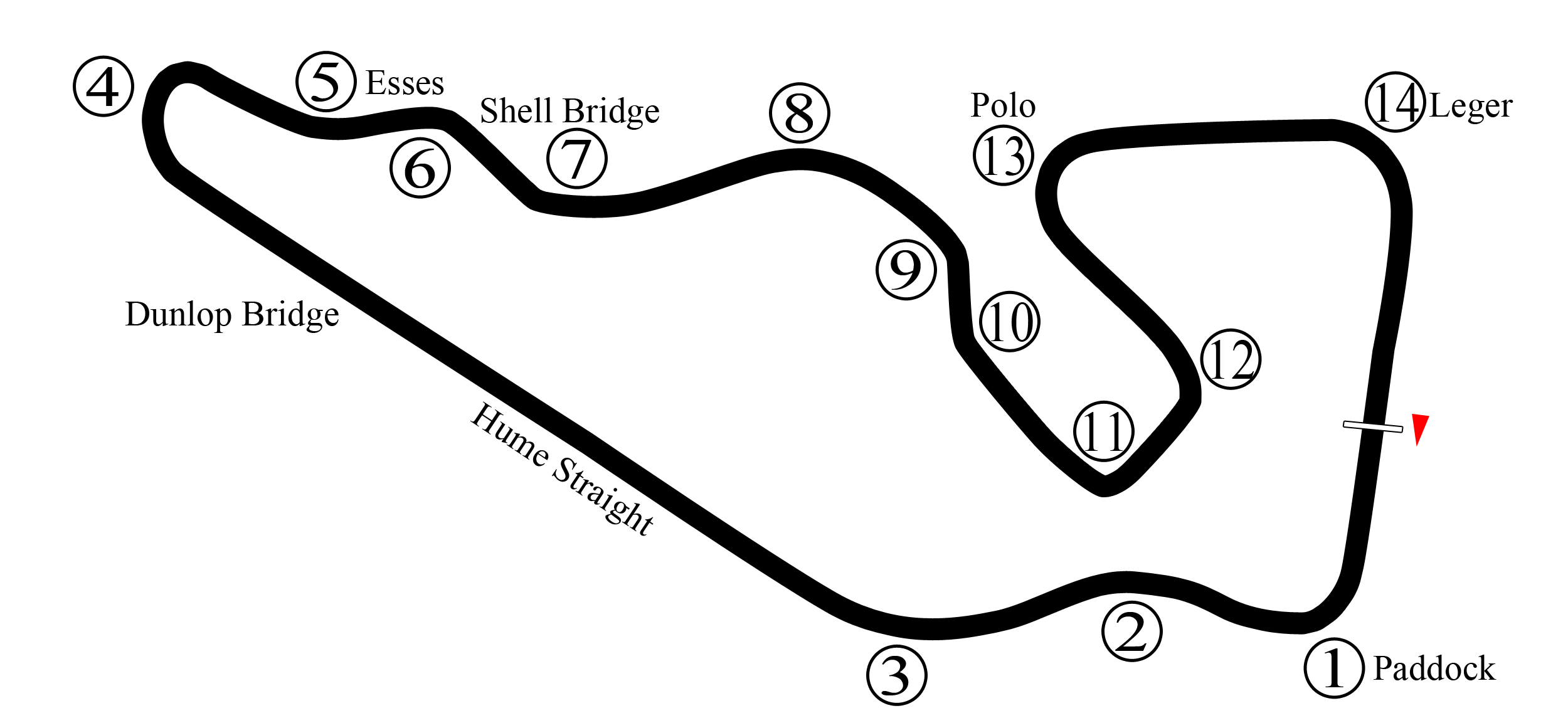
Layout of the Warwick Farm Raceway (1960-1973)

The 1964 Australian One and a Half Litre Championship was an Australian motor racing competition open to Australian 1½ Litre Formula racing cars. It was authorised by the Confederation of Australian Motor Sport as an Australian National Title. The championship was contested over a 34 lap, 76½ miles (123 km) race held at the Warwick Farm circuit in New South Wales, Australia on 6 September 1964. It was the inaugural Australian One and a Half Litre Championship, held in what was the inaugural year of the Australian 1½ Litre Formula.

The championship was won by Greg Cusack driving a Repco-Brabham-Ford.

== Results ==
Pos.	Driver	No.	Car	Entrant	Laps
1	Greg Cusack	7	Repco-Brabham-Ford	Scuderia Veloce	34
2	Arnold Glass	14	Lotus 27-Ford	Capitol Motors (Holdings) P/L	34
3	Roly Levis	8	Repco-Brabham BT2 - Ford	A. Mildren Pty Ltd	34
4	Barry Collerson	24	Repco-Brabham-Cosworth	B. Collerson	
5	Doug Kelley	26	Cooper-Climax	D. J. Kelley	
6	Ron Price	18	Lotus 18-Cosworth	R. Price	
7	A. Felton	16	Lotus 20-Ford	Kurt Keller Motors	
8	Lionel Ayers	23	M.R.C. Lotus 22-Cosworth	Motor Racing Components	
9	Keith Malcolm	17	Lotus 20-Cosworth	Boss Hill Service Station	
10	R. Salter	15	Lotus 22-Ford	Salter Motors	
?	Tony Reynolds	22	Rennmax-Ford	A. J. Reynolds	
?	Dave Walker	10	Repco-Brabham-Ford	D. Walker	
DNF	Noel Potts	20	Elfin-Ford	N. Potts	32
DNF	Glynn Scott	12	Lotus 27-Ford	Glynn Scott Motors P/L	21
DNF	Barry Lake	25	Jolus-Minx	B. Lake	20
DNS	Leo Geoghegan	11	Lotus 27-Ford	Total Team	

=== Notes ===
- Attendance: 11,000
- Pole Position: Greg Cusack, 1m 41.2s
- Leo Geoghegan damaged his Lotus 27 during Saturday practice after recording the second fastest time. He did not start in the race.
- Race time of winning car: 58m 51.9s
- Average speed of winning car: 78.19 mph
- Winning margin: 21.1s
- Fastest lap: Greg Cusack, 1m 40.8s
