= 1967 Australian Drivers' Championship =

Motor racing competition

Seasons
- ← 1966 1968 →

The 1967 Australian Drivers' Championship was an Australian motor racing competition open to Australian National Formula cars and Australian 1½ Litre Formula cars. It was authorised by the Confederation of Australian Motor Sport (CAMS) as an Australian National Title with the winner awarded the 1967 CAMS Gold Star. It was the 11th Australian Drivers' Championship to be awarded by CAMS.

The championship was won by Spencer Martin driving a Repco Brabham BT11A-Coventry Climax. Martin won two of the first four races and finished second in the other two. Despite not finishing the fifth race and not starting the sixth, he finished seven points ahead of Greg Cusack (Repco Brabham BT23A-Repco). Third was Kevin Bartlett (Repco Brabham BT11A-Coventry Climax).

In addition to Martin's two race wins, single victories were taken by Cusack, Bartlett, Leo Geoghegan (Lotus 39-Repco) and Frank Gardner (Brabham BT23D-Alfa Romeo).

== Calendar ==
The championship was contested over a six race series.

Race	Race name	Circuit, State	Date
1	Governor's Trophy	Lakeside, Queensland	25 June
2	Speed Week Trophy	Surfers Paradise, Queensland	27 August
3	Victoria Trophy	Sandown Park, Victoria	17 September
4	N/A	Mallala, South Australia	9 October
5	Examiner 1000	Symmons Plains, Tasmania	13 November
6	Hordern Trophy	Warwick Farm, New South Wales	3 December

== Points system ==
Championship points were awarded on a 9-6-4-3-2-1 basis to the first six placegetters in each race. Points from any five of the six races could be counted towards a driver's total. Only drivers racing under a CAMS General Competition License were eligible for the championship.

== Championship results ==
Position	Driver	Car	Entrant	Lak	Sur	San	Mal	Sym	War	Total
1	Spencer Martin	Repco Brabham BT11A Coventry Climax	Bob Jane Racing Team	6	9	6	9	-	-	30
2	Greg Cusack	Repco Brabham BT23A Repco	Scuderia Veloce	-	4	-	4	9	6	23
3	Kevin Bartlett	Repco Brabham BT11A Coventry Climax	Alec Mildren Racing	9	-	-	6	1	-	16
4	John Harvey	Repco Brabham BT14 Repco; Repco Brabham BT11A Coventry Climax	RC Phillips Sports Cars; Bob Jane Racing	-	-	4	-	-	9	13
5	Leo Geoghegan	Lotus 39 Repco	Geoghegan Racing Division	-	-	9	-	-	-	9
=	Paul Bolton	Repco Brabham BT7A Coventry Climax	Rorstan Motor Racing Partnership	-	6	-	3	-	-	9
=	Max Stewart	Rennmax BN1 Ford	Max Stewart Motors	2	-	-	2	2	3	9
8	Mel McEwin	Lotus 32B Coventry Climax	Mel McEwin	4	-	3	-	-	-	7
9	John McCormack	Repco Brabham BT4 Coventry Climax	John McCormack	-	-	-	-	6	-	6
10	David Sternberg	Lotus Alexis Ford	David Sternberg	-	-	-	-	4	-	4
=	Phil West	Repco Brabham BT2 Ford	Competition Cars	-	-	-	-	-	4	4
12	Mike Champion	Repco Brabham BT2 Ford	Competition Cars	3	-	-	-	-	-	3
=	Glynn Scott	Lotus 27 Ford	Glyn Scott Motors	-	3	-	-	-	-	3
=	Lynn Archer	Elfin Catalina Ford	Lyn Archer Motors	-	-	-	-	3	-	3
=	Garrie Cooper	Elfin Mono Mk2D Ford	Elfin Sports Cars	-	-	2	-	-	1	3
16	Brian Page	Elfin Mono Mk1 Lancia	JP McGuire	-	2	-	-	-	-	2
=	Alfredo Costanzo	Elfin Mono Mk2B Ford	Alfredo Costanzo	-	-	-	-	-	2	2
18	Stan Keen	Elfin Mono Mk1 Ford	Stan Keen	1	-	-	-	-	-	1
=	Col Green	Elfin Mono Mk1 Ford	Col Green	-	1	-	-	-	-	1
=	Jack Hunnam	Elfin Mono Mk2D Ford	Jack Hunnum Motors	-	-	1	-	-	-	1
=	John Walker	Elfin Mono Mk2B Ford	Gilbert Motor Bodies	-	-	-	1	-	-	1

Note:

- New Zealander Graeme Lawrence placed 3rd at Surfers Paradise and 4th at Sandown but was not eligible to score championship points.
- British-based Australian Frank Gardner placed 1st at Warwick Farm but was not eligible to score championship points.
