= 1973 Sandown Park Cup =

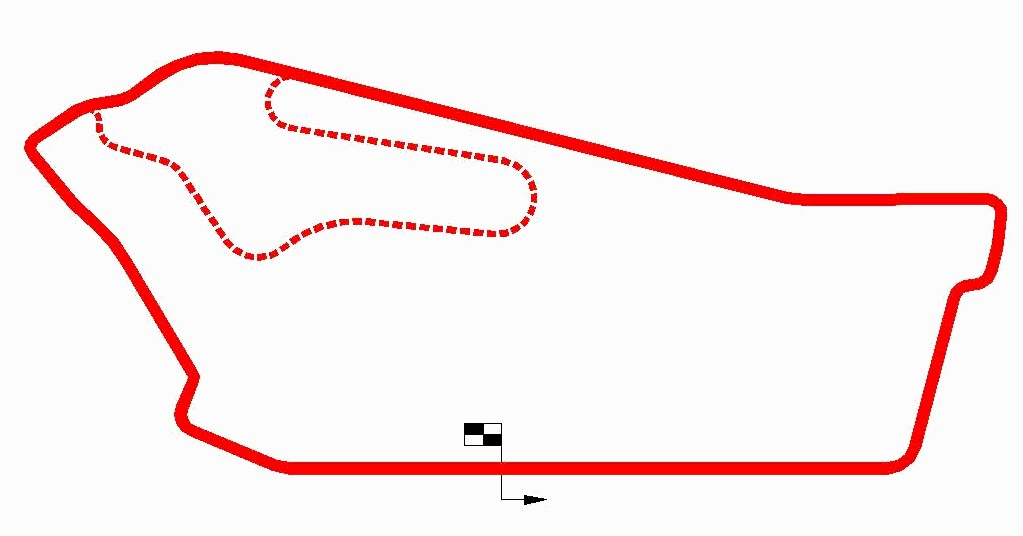
Layout of the Sandown Raceway international circuit (1984–1998)

The 1973 Sandown Park Cup was the seventh round of the 1973 Tasman Series. It was a Formula 5000 race held at Sandown International Raceway. It was held on 18 February on the same circuit that would in November be used for the 1973 Australian Grand Prix. New Zealander Graham McRae won the race and went on to win the Grand Prix as well.

The race was promoted by the Light Car Club of Australia as the Chesterfield 100.

== Classification ==
Pos	Driver	Car	Laps	Time
1	(New Zealand) Graham McRae	McRae GM1 / Chevrolet 4995cc V8	52	55m 32.3s
2	(Australia) John McCormack	Elfin MR5 / Repco 4994cc V8	52	56m 02.0s
3	(Australia) Max Stewart	Lola T330 / Chevrolet 4995cc V8	52	
4	(Australia) Frank Matich	Matich A50 / Repco 4994cc V8	52	
5	(Australia) Johnnie Walker	Matich A50 / Repco 4994cc V8	51	
6	(United States) Sam Posey	Surtees TS11 / Chevrolet 4995cc V8	51	
7	(United Kingdom) Steve Thompson	Chevron B24 / Chevrolet 4995cc V8	51	
8	(New Zealand) Graeme Lawrence	Surtees TS15 / Hart 1927cc 4cyl	49	
9	(New Zealand) Dexter Dunlop	McRae GM1 / Chevrolet 4995cc V8	48	
Ret	(Australia) Stan Keen	Elfin MR5 / Ford 4990cc V8	38	
Ret	(Australia) Kevin Bartlett	Lola T300 / Chevrolet 4995cc V8	27	
Ret	(United Kingdom) Alan Rollinson	McRae GM1 / Chevrolet 4995cc V8	9	
Ret	(Australia) Garrie Cooper	Elfin MR5 / Repco 4994cc V8	4	
Ret	(Australia) Bob Muir	McLaren M10B / Chevrolet 4995cc V8	1	

== Notes ==
- Pole position: Graham McRae, McRae GM1 Chevrolet, 1'01.3
- Fastest lap: Frank Matich, Matich A50 Repco Holden, 1'02.6s
