= John Harvey (racing driver) =

Australian racing driver (1938–2020)

- Nationality: Australian
- Born: 21 February 1938 Sydney, New South Wales, Australia
- Died: 5 December 2020 (aged 82) Melbourne, Victoria, Australia
- Retired: 1988

Australian Touring Car Championship
- Years active: 1965–1986
- Teams: Holden Dealer Team
- Wins: 2
- Best finish: 3rd in 1979 Australian Touring Car Championship

Previous series
- 1965–70 1966 1966–72 1969–72: Australian Drivers' Champ. Australian 1½ Litre Champ. Tasman Series; Australian Sports Car Champ.

Championship titles
- 1966 1971 1972 1983: Australian 1½ Litre Champ. Australian Sports Car Champ. Australian Sports Car Champ. Bathurst 1000

Awards
- Medal of the Order of Australia, 2020

John Francis Harvey OAM (21 February 1938 – 5 December 2020) was an Australian racing driver. He was a top Speedcar driver for many years in the 1950s and 1960s, winning many championship races including the NSW Championship for three successive years and the Victorian Championship twice before turning his skills to road racing where he had a long and successful career until his retirement at the end of 1988. In 1987, Harvey made history driving the General Motors Sunraycer to victory in the inaugural World Solar Challenge from Darwin to Adelaide, the first international race for purely solar powered cars.

== Career ==
Despite being regarded as one of the best Speedcar drivers in Australia, Harvey switched from speedway to road racing in 1964 following the deaths of a few friends in Speedcar racing, as well as a contentious six-month suspension received from the Sydney-based National Speedcar Club officials after he was alleged to spin fellow driver Al Staples in a scratch race at the Sydney Showground Speedway. Although this decision was later reverted to no suspension at the drivers' meeting, Harvey decided to opt-out of Speedway to go road racing. He would make a short-lived comeback to racing speedcars in 1974 at the Liverpool Speedway in western Sydney after the track promoters changed the 440-metre (480 yd) D-shaped oval from a dirt track to a bitumen track, once again racing for the same car owner he had in the 1960s, Ronald Mackay.

Harvey drove cars such as the Austin Cooper S and Brabham BT14 Ford 1.5 litre. Harvey won the 1966 Australian 1½ Litre Championship in the Brabham and in the same year finished runner up in the Australian Drivers' Championship for 2.5 litre Australian National Formula cars in the same car, competing against much more powerful machinery, also winning the NSW 1.5 litre Road Racing Championship. He began involvement with Bob Jane's racing team in 1967 and moved to Melbourne. Harvey won the 1971 and 1972 Australian Sports Car Championships driving the McLaren M6B Repco V8 for Bob Jane. He drove Jane's Repco V8 powered Holden Torana in Sports Sedan racing in the early 1970s, winning both the Toby Lee Series at Oran Park and the Marlboro Series at Calder Park Raceway in 1973.

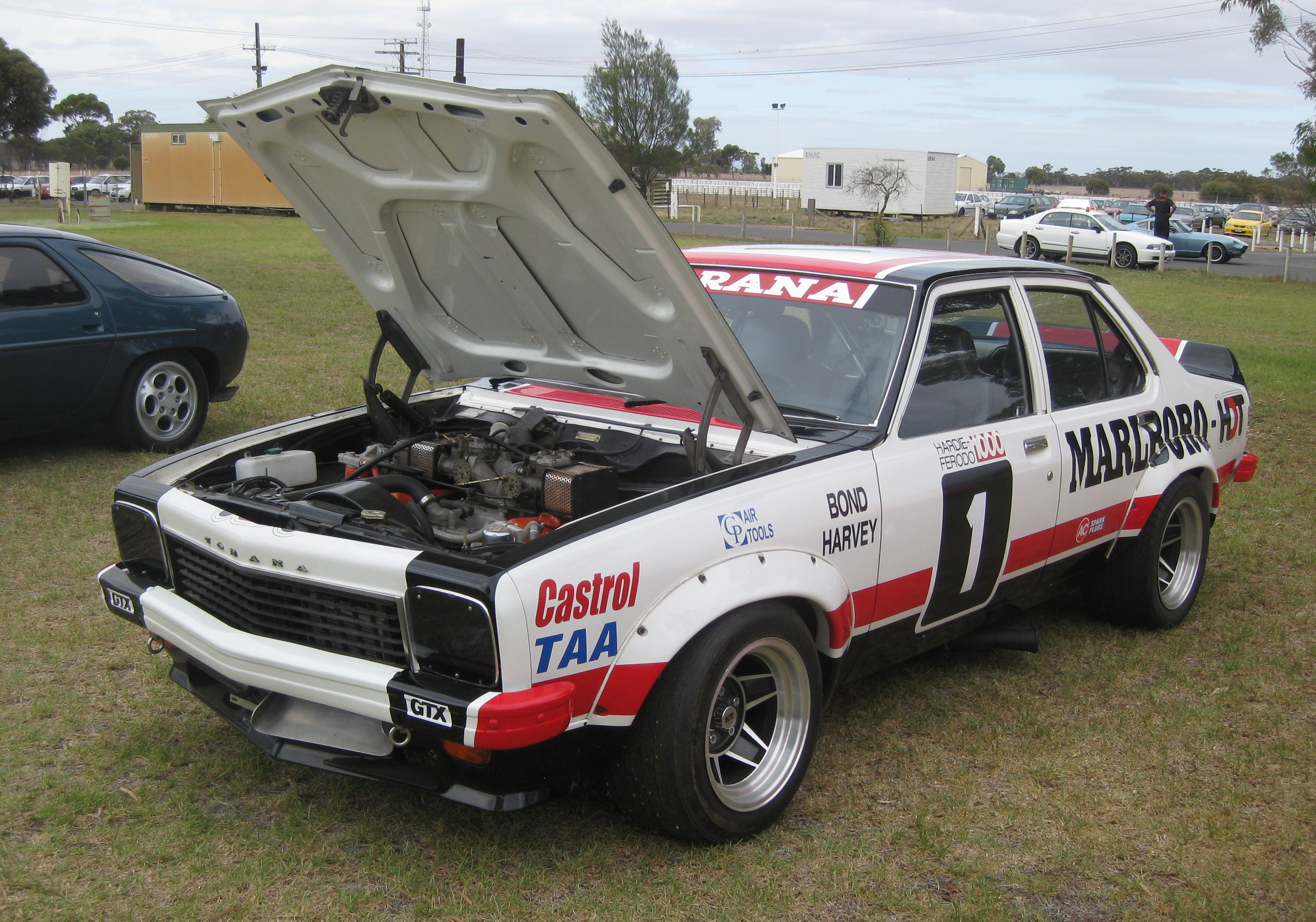
Reproduction of the 1976 Bathurst Bond/Harvey Torana

In 1976, Harvey won the first round of the Australian Touring Car Championship in a one-off drive in a B&D Autos-sponsored Torana L34 at Symmons Plains. Later in the year, Harvey was signed up to co-drive with Colin Bond in the Holden Dealer Team Torana L34 which finished a close second in the Bathurst 1000.

The race-winning No. 7 Holden was accidentally credited with an extra lap, putting it ahead of the No. 1 Holden. The error was picked up after the race and the relevant race official offered the Holden Dealer Team, the official factory team, the right to appeal. However, the No. 7 car was entered by Ron Hodgson Motors, one of Holden's biggest dealerships. The Holden hierarchy decided it would be good 'politic' to let Bob Morris and British sportscar racer John Fitzpatrick keep the win. Holden apologised to John Harvey for this at a testimonial dinner in 2002.

With Bond leaving the Holden team at the end of 1976, Harvey then became the lead driver for the 1977 season.

In 1978, Peter Brock re-joined the Holden Dealer Team and became No. 1 driver with Harvey driving the No. 2 car. This established the pattern for almost a decade. The Harvey car effectively became Brock's backup, notably winning the 1978 Rothmans 500 event at Oran Park teamed with Charlie O'Brien. In 1980 Peter Brock took over the Holden Dealer Team, deciding John Harvey would not contest the ATCC races and contest only the endurance races at the end of the year. Peter Brock teamed with John Harvey (1980, 1981) for the CRC 300, winning both. This arrangement continued until the advent of Group A in Australia in 1985, though Harvey did run in rounds of the 1984 ATCC, driving Brock's #05 when Brock and Perkins were attempting to win Le Mans. Harvey would then run selected rounds in the 1985 ATCC, as well as rounds of the 1986 ATCC.

Harvey's biggest win came with the HDT at the 1983 James Hardie 1000. Originally to be partnered with Brock's brother Phil, Harvey qualified his No. 25 Holden VH Commodore (the car in which Brock and Perkins had won the 1982 race) in fifth place (Brock claimed pole in the No. 05). After just eight laps, Brock's car blew its engine, seemingly putting him and Perkins out of the race. However, due to the pair being cross-entered in the No. 25, Brock and Perkins then took over from Harvey for the rest of the race (leaving Phil Brock without a drive). The race win was controversial at the time as many felt Brock and Perkins should not have been allowed to move into the HDT's second car after theirs retired. Under race rules at the time, however, cross-entering was allowed and had actually been used in previous 1000s, though this was the first time drivers had moved from one car to another and had gone on to win the race.

Harvey would go on to finish second at Bathurst the following year in the last race for the Group C touring cars in what was a 1-2 form finish for the Dealer Team with Brock/Perkins bringing in their VK Commodore home first in front of Harvey's co-driver, 25-year-old Tasmanian David “Skippy” Parsons. Harvey would finish second again two years later for the HDT. Driving a VK Commodore SS Group A, he teamed with HDT driver/engineer Neal Lowe to finish second behind the Commodore of Allan Grice and Graeme Bailey.

Harvey won the 1986 Pukekohe 500 with Neal Lowe in their new Group A SS VK Commodore, and the pair finished second to HDT teammates Brock and Allan Moffat at the 1987 Nissan 500 Wellington.

Harvey split with Brock by 1987, being unhappy with Brock's flirtation with ‘New Age’ ideas like his ‘Energy Polarizer’. Harvey told his side of the story of the split in Bill Tuckey's 1987 book The Rise and Fall of Peter Brock.

In March 1987, Harvey teamed up with Allan Moffat to drive their HDT built (and covertly bought by Moffat) Holden VL Commodore SS Group A to victory in the first round of the 1987 World Touring Car Championship at the famous Monza circuit in Italy. After finishing seventh, the pair were promoted as the first six BMW Motorsport backed BMW M3's were disqualified from the race for being some 50–80 kg underweight (after a protest from a privateer M3 team, the works M3's were found to have been fitted with lightweight carbon-fibre and kevlar body panels). Later at the Spa, 24 Hours in August, Moffat, and Harvey achieved a class win and finished 4th outright behind the works BMW Team M3's. Sydney driver Tony Mulvihill had also been listed to drive the No. 5 Rothmans sponsored Commodore at Spa, though he was caught out by the notorious Ardennes weather in qualifying and failed to qualify for the race. This forced Moffat and Harvey to drive the 24 hours with just the two of them while most other teams used at least 3 drivers.

After Moffat abandoned the Commodore in favor of Andy Rouse's Ford Sierra RS500, Harvey missed the 1987 James Hardie 1000 which was a round of the WTCC. It was the first Bathurst race Harvey had missed since 1972. The race was also the ninth and last Bathurst 1000 win for his longtime teammate Peter Brock.

Shortly after the Brock breakup, Harvey was appointed lead driver of the GM Sunraycer team and made two trips to the US for testing and race team preparation. He was recommended for his professionalism and discipline by Ray Borrett (Holden's reliability and “skunkworks” motor sport engineer). Ray was involved in the development of Sunraycer in the US and became the race team manager.

Harvey's last Bathurst 1000 was in 1988 where he teamed with Kevin Bartlett in a Holden VL Commodore SS Group A SV to finish in 14th after qualifying 22nd. Early in the race, Harvey had been dicing with Brock, now racing a BMW M3. Harvey almost didn't get to drive in the 1988 race. At the time he was working for the Tom Walkinshaw owned Holden Special Vehicles and Walkinshaw had a rule that barring himself, senior management could not participate in dangerous activities such as being a race driver. Walkinshaw finally relented and let Harvey race at Bathurst, originally offering him the lead driver role in the HSV team's third car, something which Harvey turned down stating that "I had been the number two behind Brock for eight years and I wasn't about to become the number three".

During Round 7 of the 1988 Australian Touring Car Championship at Sandown, and despite being part of the management team at HSV, Harvey was on hand to be part of Allan Moffat's team for the weekend (complete with a Moffat team ANZ Bank jacket). From 1988 Moffat was racing a Ford Sierra RS500 built by Swiss ace Ruedi Eggenberger. Ironically, Harvey's old HDT teammate Larry Perkins through his Perkins Engineering was running the factory-backed Holden team in the 1988 ATCC under the name of Holden Special Vehicles.

In February 1988, Harvey drove the new VL Commodore SS Group A SV which was the pace car driver for the first-ever NASCAR race held outside of North America, the Goodyear NASCAR 500 held at the then-new, A$54 million Calder Park Thunderdome in Melbourne.

Following the 1988 Tooheys 1000, Harvey retired from competitive motorsport to concentrate on his work with Holden and HSV.

In 2018, CAMS awarded Harvey a place in the Motor Sport Hall of Fame.

In the 2020 Australia Day Honours, Harvey was awarded the Medal of the Order of Australia for service to motor sports.

== Death ==
Harvey died on 5 December 2020, aged 82, from lung cancer.

== Career results ==
Season	Series	Position	Car	Team
1965	Australian Drivers' Championship	10th	Brabham BT14 Ford	RC Phillips Sports Cars
1965	Australian Touring Car Championship	7th	Austin Cooper S	
1966	Australian Drivers' Championship	**2nd**	Brabham BT14 Ford	RC Phillips Sports Cars
1966	Australian 1½ Litre Championship	**1st**	Brabham BT14 Ford	RC Phillips Sports Cars
1966	Australian Touring Car Championship	4th	Austin Cooper S	RC Phillips Sports Cars
1967	Tasman Series	10th	Brabham BT14 Ford	
1967	Australian Drivers' Championship	4th	Brabham BT14 Ford; Brabham BT11 Climax	
1969	Australian Drivers' Championship	4th	Brabham BT23E Repco	
1970	Tasman Series	12th	Brabham BT23E Repco	
1970	Australian Drivers' Championship	**3rd**	Brabham BT23E Repco	
1971	Australian Sports Car Championship	**1st**	McLaren M6B Repco	Bob Jane Racing
1972	Australian Sports Car Championship	**1st**	McLaren M6B Repco	Bob Jane Racing
1972	Australian Touring Car Championship	9th	Holden HQ Monaro GTS 350	Bob Jane Racing
1973	Toby Lee Series	**1st**	Holden LJ Torana-Repco	Bob Jane Racing
1976	Australian Touring Car Championship	11th	Holden LH Torana SL/R 5000 L34	B&D Autos; Holden Dealer Team
1977	Australian Touring Car Championship	6th	Holden LH Torana SL/R 5000 L34; Holden LX Torana SS A9X	Holden Dealer Team
1978	Australian Touring Car Championship	8th	Holden LX Torana SS A9X	Holden Dealer Team
1979	Australian Touring Car Championship	**3rd**	Holden LX Torana SS A9X	Holden Dealer Team
1982	Australian Endurance Championship	24th	Holden VH Commodore SS	Holden Dealer Team
1983	Australian Endurance Championship	11th	Holden VH Commodore SS	Holden Dealer Team
1984	Australian Touring Car Championship	33rd	Holden VH Commodore SS	Holden Dealer Team
1984	Australian Endurance Championship	4th	Holden VH Commodore SS	Holden Dealer Team
1985	Australian Touring Car Championship	19th	Holden VK Commodore	Holden Dealer Team
1985	Australian Endurance Championship	NC	Holden VK Commodore	Holden Dealer Team
1986	Australian Touring Car Championship	11th	Holden VK Commodore SS Group A	Holden Dealer Team
1986	Australian Endurance Championship	8th	Holden VK Commodore SS Group A	Holden Dealer Team
1986	South Pacific Touring Car Championship	15th	Holden VK Commodore SS Group A	Holden Dealer Team
1987	World Touring Car Championship	NC	Holden VL Commodore SS Group A	Allan Moffat Racing
1987	World Solar Challenge	**1st**	GM Sunraycer	General Motors
1988	Asia-Pacific Touring Car Championship	NC	Holden VL Commodore SS Group A SV	Bob Forbes Racing

=== Complete Australian Touring Car Championship results ===
(key) (Races in bold indicate pole position) (Races in italics indicate fastest lap)

Year	Team	Car	1	2	3	4	5	6	7	8	9	10	11	DC	Points
1965		Austin Cooper S	SAN; 7											7th	-
1966		Austin Cooper S	BAT; 4											4th	-
1972	Bob Jane Racing	Holden HQ Monaro GTS 350	SYM	CAL	BAT; 4	SAN	AIR	WAR	SUR	ORA				9th	9
1976	B&D Autos	Holden LH Torana SL/R 5000 L34	SYM; 1	CAL	ORA									11th	23
1976	Holden Dealer Team	Holden LH Torana SL/R 5000 L34				SAN; 4	AMA; 4	AIR; 3	LAK	SAN	AIR	SUR	PHI; Ret	11th	23
1977	Holden Dealer Team	Holden LH Torana SL/R 5000 L34 Holden LX Torana SS A9X	SYM; 8	CAL; 4	ORA; 2	AMA; Ret	SAN; 3	AIR; 5	LAK; 3	SAN; Ret	AIR; 3	SUR	PHI; 4	6th	40
1978	Holden Dealer Team	Holden LX Torana SS A9X	SYM; 3	ORA; Ret	AMA	SAN; 4	WAN; 2	CAL	LAK; Ret	AIR				8th	19
1979	Holden Dealer Team	Holden LX Torana SS A9X	SYM; 1	CAL; 3	ORA; 4	SAN; 6	WAN; 2	SUR; 3	LAK; 2	AIR; 3				3rd	54
1984	Holden Dealer Team	Holden VH Commodore SS	SAN	SYM	WAN	SUR; Ret	ORA	LAK; 9	AIR					33rd	9
1985	Holden Dealer Team	Holden VK Commodore	WIN	SAN	SYM	WAN	AIR	CAL; 5	SUR	LAK	AMA	ORA; 5		19th	30
1986	Holden Dealer Team	Holden VK Commodore SS Group A	AMA; Ret	SYM; 3	SAN; 6	AIR; 5	WAN; Ret	SUR	CAL; 6	LAK	WIN	ORA		11th	61

=== Complete FIA European Touring Car Championship results ===
(key) (Races in bold indicate pole position) (Races in italics indicate fastest lap)

Year	Team	Car	1	2	3	4	5	6	7	8	9	10	11	12	13	14	DC	Points
1986	(Australia) Holden Dealer Team	Holden VK Commodore SS Group A	MNZ	DON	HOC	MIS	AND	BNO	ZEL	NUR	SPA; 22	SIL	NOG	ZOL	JAR	EST	NC	0

=== Complete World Touring Car Championship results ===
(key) (Races in bold indicate pole position) (Races in italics indicate fastest lap)

Year	Team	Car	1	2	3	4	5	6	7	8	9	10	11	DC	Points
1987	(Australia) Allan Moffat Racing	Holden VL Commodore SS Group A	MNZ; 1	JAR; Ret	DIJ; Ret	NUR	SPA ovr:4 cls:1	BNO	SIL	BAT	CLD	WEL	FJI	NC	0

† Not registered for series & points

=== Complete Asia-Pacific Touring Car Championship results ===
(key) (Races in bold indicate pole position) (Races in italics indicate fastest lap)

Year	Team	Car	1	2	3	4	DC	Points
1988	(Australia) Bob Forbes Racing	Holden VL Commodore SS Group A SV	BAT; 14	WEL	PUK	FJI	NC	0

=== Complete Bathurst 1000 results ===
Year	Team	Co-drivers	Car	Class	Laps	Pos.	Class pos.
1965	(Australia) BMC	(Australia) John French	Morris Cooper S	C	24	DNF	DNF
1966		(Australia) Kevin Bartlett	Volvo 122S	D	118	15th	4th
1971	(Australia) Bob Jane Racing Team	(Australia) Bob Jane	Holden LC Torana GTR XU-1	D	50	DNF	DNF
1973	(Australia) Bob Jane Racing	(Australia) Bob Jane	Holden LJ Torana GTR XU-1	D	161	4th	4th
1974	(Australia) Norman G Booth Pty Ltd	(Australia) Jim Hunter	Holden LH Torana SL/R 5000	3001 – 6000cc	7	DNF	DNF
1975	(Australia) Massey Holden	(New Zealand) Peter Janson	Holden LH Torana SL/R 5000 L34	D	143	DNF	DNF
1976	(Australia) Holden Dealer Team	(Australia) Colin Bond	Holden LH Torana SL/R 5000 L34	3001cc - 6000cc	163	**2nd**	**2nd**
1977	(Australia) Holden Dealer Team	(Australia) Wayne Negus	Holden LX Torana SS A9X Hatchback	3001cc - 6000cc	91	DNF	DNF
1978	(Australia) Holden Dealer Team	(Australia) Charlie O'Brien	Holden LX Torana SS A9X Hatchback	A	139	19th	9th
1979	(Australia) Holden Dealer Team	(Australia) Ron Harrop	Holden LX Torana SS A9X Hatchback	A	57	DNF	DNF
1980	(Australia) Holden Dealer Team	(Australia) Ron Harrop	Holden VC Commodore	3001-6000cc	78	DNF	DNF
1981	(Australia) Holden Dealer Team	(Australia) Vern Schuppan	Holden VC Commodore	8 Cylinder & Over	37	DNF	DNF
1982	(Australia) Holden Dealer Team	(Australia) Gary Scott	Holden VH Commodore SS	A	162	**3rd**	**3rd**
1983	(Australia) Holden Dealer Team	(Australia) Peter Brock (Australia) Larry Perkins (Australia) Phil Brock	Holden VH Commodore SS	A	163	**1st**	**1st**
1984	(Australia) Holden Dealer Team	(Australia) David Parsons	Holden VK Commodore	Group C	161	**2nd**	**2nd**
1985	(Australia) Holden Dealer Team	(Australia) David Parsons	Holden VK Commodore	C	96	DNF	DNF
1986	(Australia) Holden Dealer Team	(New Zealand) Neal Lowe	Holden VK Commodore SS Group A	C	163	**2nd**	**2nd**
1988	(Australia) Bob Forbes Racing	(Australia) Kevin Bartlett	Holden VL Commodore SS Group A SV	A	140	14th	10th

=== Complete Sandown Endurance results ===
Year	Team	Co-drivers	Car	Class	Laps	Pos.	Class pos.
1973	(Australia) Bob Jane Racing	drove solo	Holden LJ Torana GTR XU-1	D	57	DNF	DNF
1977	(Australia) Holden Dealer Team	drove solo	Holden Torana LX SS A9X Hatchback	A	NA	DNF	DNF
1978	(Australia) Holden Dealer Team	drove solo	Holden Torana LX SS A9X Hatchback	6000cc	128	**2nd**	**2nd**
1979	(Australia) Holden Dealer Team	drove solo	Holden Torana LX SS A9X Hatchback	A	128	**2nd**	**2nd**
1981	(Australia) Holden Dealer Team	(Australia) Vern Schuppan	Holden VC Commodore	A	117	4th	4th
1982	(Australia) Holden Dealer Team	(Australia) Gary Scott	Holden VH Commodore SS	D	108	4th	4th
1983	(Australia) Holden Dealer Team	(Australia) Peter Brock	Holden VH Commodore SS	Over 3000cc	127	DSQ	DSQ
1984	(Australia) Holden Dealer Team	(Australia) David Parsons	Holden VK Commodore	Over 3000cc	127	**3rd**	**3rd**
1985	(Australia) Holden Dealer Team	(Australia) David Parsons	Holden VK Commodore	A	78	DNF	DNF
1986	(Australia) Holden Dealer Team	(New Zealand) Neal Lowe	Holden VK Commodore SS Group A	B	125	8th	8th

=== Complete Spa 24 Hours results ===
Year	Team	Co-drivers	Car	Class	Laps	Pos.	Class pos.
1986	(Australia) Holden Dealer Team	(Australia) Peter Brock (Canada) Allan Moffat	Holden VK Commodore SS Group A	Div.3	412	22nd	10th
1987	(Australia) Allan Moffat Racing	(Canada) Allan Moffat (Australia) Tony Mulvihill	Holden VL Commodore SS Group A	Div.3	468	4th	**1st**

Sporting positions
Preceded by Peter Brock; Larry Perkins	Winner of the Bathurst 1000; 1983 (with Peter Brock and Larry Perkins)	Succeeded by Peter Brock; Larry Perkins
