= 1973 Tasman Series =

Motorsport series in Australia and New Zealand

Seasons
- ← 1972 1974 →

The 1973 Tasman Series was a motor racing competition staged in New Zealand and Australia for cars complying with the Tasman Formula. The series, which began on 6 January and ended on 25 February after eight races, was the tenth Tasman Series. Officially known as the Tasman Championship for Drivers, it was organised jointly by the Motorsport Association New Zealand Incorporated and the Confederation of Australian Motor Sport. The championship was won by Graham McRae, driving a McRae GM1 Chevrolet.

== Races ==
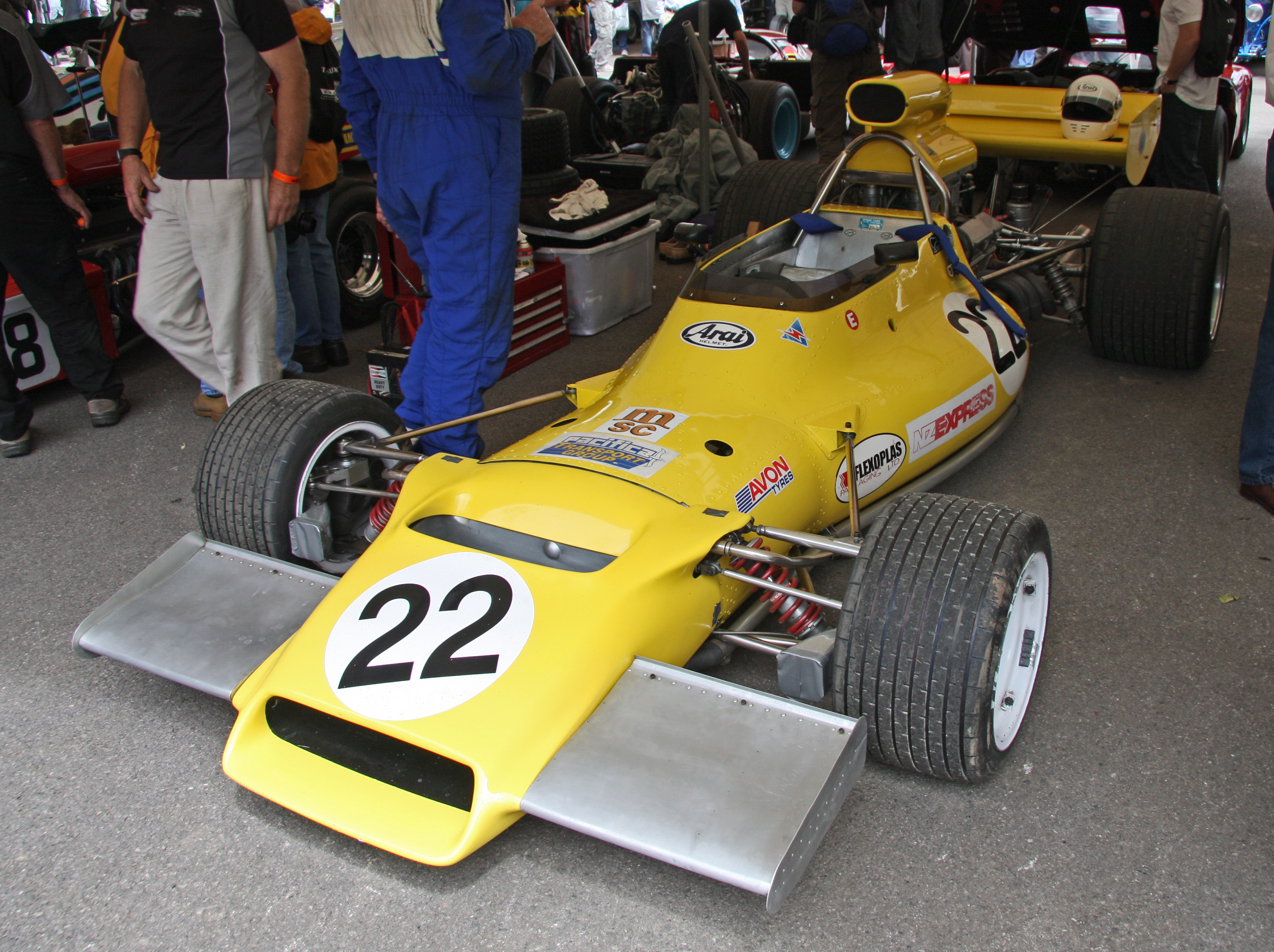
A McRae GM1, similar to the car driven by 1973 Tasman Series winner Graham McRae

The series was contested over eight rounds.

Round		Name	Circuit	Date	Winning driver	Winning car	Winning entrant	Report
New Zealand	1	New Zealand Grand Prix	Pukekohe	6 January	(Australia) John McCormack	Elfin MR5 Repco-Holden	Ansett Team Elfin	Report
New Zealand	2	Levin International	Levin	13 January	(New Zealand) Graham McRae	McRae GM1 Chevrolet	STP	Report
New Zealand	3	Lady Wigram Trophy	Wigram	20 January	(New Zealand) Graham McRae	McRae GM1 Chevrolet	STP	Report
New Zealand	4	Rothmans International	Teretonga	28 January	(United Kingdom) Alan Rollinson	McRae GM1 Chevrolet	McKechnie Racing Organisation	Report
Australia	5	Surfers Paradise International	Surfers Paradise	4 February	(Australia) Frank Matich	Matich A50 Repco Holden	Frank Matich	Report
Australia	6	Chesterfield 100	Warwick Farm	11 February	(United Kingdom) Steve Thompson	Chevron B24 Chevrolet	Servis Racing Team	Report
Australia	7	Chesterfield 100	Sandown	18 February	(New Zealand) Graham McRae	McRae GM1 Chevrolet	STP	Report
Australia	8	Chesterfield 100	Adelaide	25 February	(Australia) John McCormack	Elfin MR5 Repco-Holden	Ansett Team Elfin	Report

== Points system ==
Points were awarded at each race on the following basis:

Position	1	2	3	4	5	6
Points	9	6	4	3	2	1

All races were counted towards the final totals for each driver.

== Series standings ==
Pos	Driver	Car	Entrant	Puk	Lev	Wig	Ter	Sur	War	San	Ade	Pts
1	(New Zealand) Graham McRae	McRae GM1 Chevrolet	STP	4	1	1	10	2	3	1	Ret	40
2	(Australia) John McCormack	Elfin MR5 Repco Holden	Ansett Team Elfin	1	Ret	Ret	4	6	6	2	1	29
3	(Australia) Frank Matich	Matich A50 Repco Holden	Frank Matich Racing Pty Ltd; Frank Matich	Ret	2	4	Ret	1	2	4	Ret	27
4	(United Kingdom) Steve Thompson	Chevron B24 Chevrolet	Servis / Alan Brodie; Servis Racing Team	3	Ret	3	6	Ret	1	7	3	22
5	(United Kingdom) Alan Rollinson	McRae GM1 Chevrolet	McKechnie Racing Organisation	2	Ret	Ret	1	Ret	Ret	Ret	2	21
6	(Australia) Max Stewart	Lola T330 Chevrolet	Max Stewart Motors; Lola Cars Ltd	Ret	Ret	Ret	3	3	5	3	4	17
7	(Australia) Warwick Brown	Lola T300 Chevrolet	Team Target	Ret	3	2	7	DNS				10
8	(United States) Sam Posey	Surtees TS11 Chevrolet	Champ Car Inc	Ret	Ret	Ret	2	5	7	6	Ret	9
9	(Australia) Johnnie Walker	Matich A50 Repco Holden	Johnnie Walker					4	4	5	Ret	8
10	(New Zealand) David Oxton	Begg FM5 Chevrolet	GN Begg Engineering Co	Ret	5	5	9					4
11	(Australia) Kevin Bartlett	Lola T300 Chevrolet	Chesterfield Filter Racing	Ret	4	7	8	10	8	Ret	9	3
12	(New Zealand) Garry Pedersen	Begg FM4 Chevrolet	Wright Machinery Ltd	5	12		12					2
=	(Japan) Noritake Takahara	Brabham BT36 Ford	Takahara Racing Inc	7	9	10	5	8				2
=	(New Zealand) Dexter Dunlop	McRae GM1 Chevrolet	Dunlop Racing	Ret	6	6	11	9	11	9	Ret	2
=	(Australia) Bob Muir	McLaren M10B Chevrolet	Pat Burke Racing							Ret	5	2
16	(Australia) Garrie Cooper	Elfin MR5 Repco Holden	Ansett Team Elfin					Ret		Ret	6	1
=	(New Zealand) Ken Smith	March 722 Ford	Air NZ Motor Racing	6	7							1
Pos	Driver	Car	Entrant	Puk	Lev	Wig	Ter	Sur	War	San	Ade	Pts

Colour	Result
Gold	Winner
Silver	Second place
Bronze	Third place
Green	Points classification
Blue	Non-points classification
Blue	Non-classified finish (NC)
Purple	Retired, not classified (Ret)
Red	Did not qualify (DNQ)
Red	Did not pre-qualify (DNPQ)
Black	Disqualified (DSQ)
White	Did not start (DNS)
White	Withdrew (WD)
White	Race cancelled (C)
Blank	Did not practice (DNP)
Blank	Did not arrive (DNA)
Blank	Excluded (EX)
