= Levin Motor Racing Circuit =

Motorsport track in New Zealand

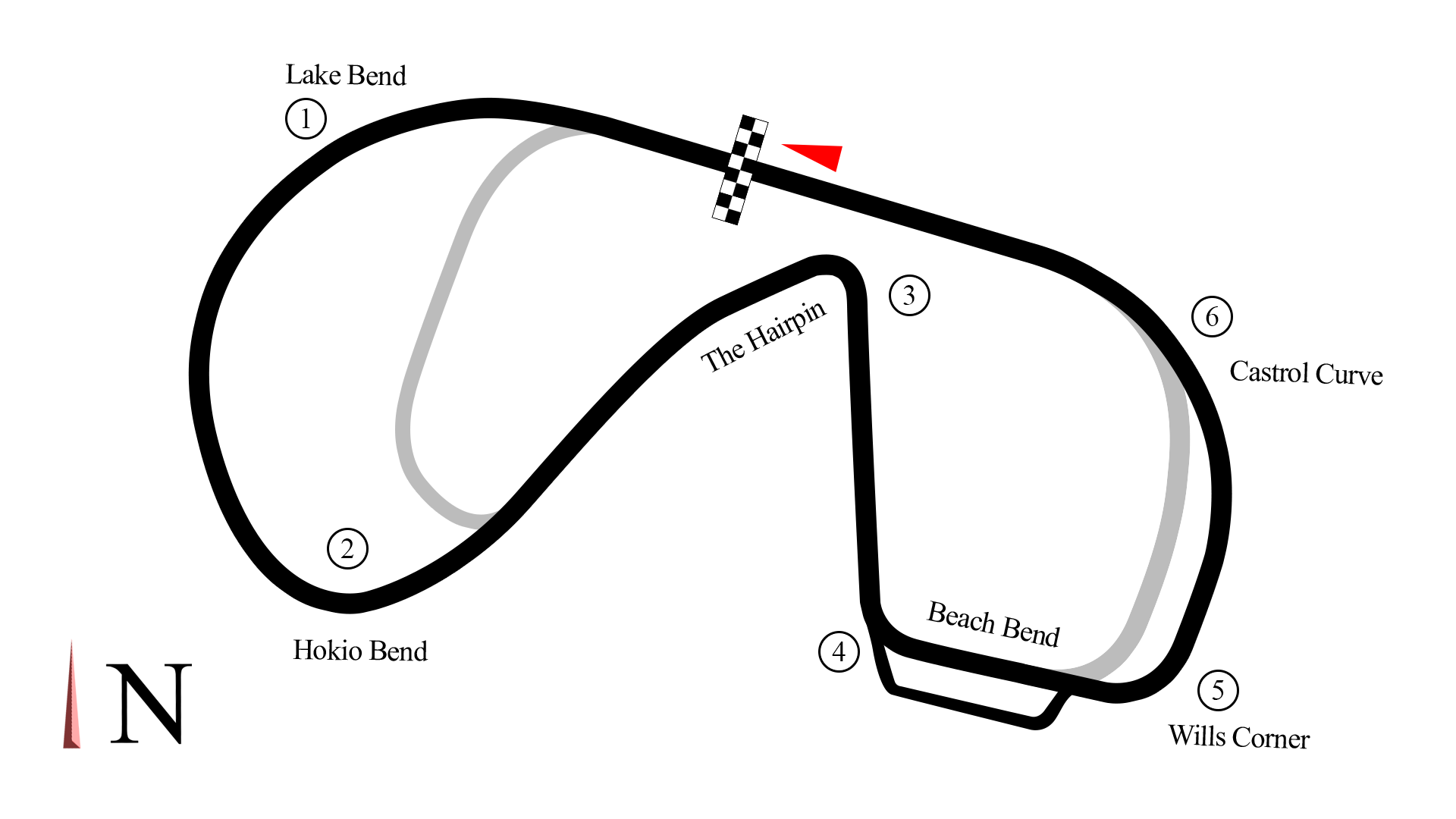
- Full Circuit (1966–1975)
- Location: Levin, New Zealand
- Coordinates: 40°37′35″S 175°15′57″E
- Owner: Levin Motor Racing Club Ltd.
- Broke ground: August 1955; 71 years ago
- Opened: 14 January 1956; 70 years ago
- Closed: December 1975; 50 years ago
- Major events: Tasman Series (1964–1975)

Full Circuit (1966–1975)
- Length: 1.899 km (1.180 mi)
- Turns: 6
- Race lap record: 0.43.400 ( (New Zealand) Graham McRae, McRae GM2, 1974, F5000)

Full Circuit (1960–1965)
- Length: 1.770 km (1.100 mi)
- Turns: 6
- Race lap record: 0:49.900 ( (United Kingdom) Jim Clark, Lotus 32B, 1965, F2)

Full Circuit (1956–1959)
- Length: 1.448 km (0.900 mi)
- Turns: 6

The Levin Motor Racing Circuit was a 1.899 km (1.180 mi) permanent motor racing track that was located in Levin in Manawatū–Whanganui, New Zealand. It was opened in January 1956 and continued to operate until the circuits closure in 1975.

Built as the first permanent race track facility in New Zealand, the track played an integral role in the development of motorsport in the country. It held an annual round of the ultra-popular Tasman Series which attracted international drivers and teams in the single-seater category and races at this venue often attracted capacity crowds that often doubled, or tripled, the local towns population.

By the end of 1975, the 20-year lease for the circuit was due to expire. Facilities were in need of repair which the racing club were unable to pay for. This, as well as the rapid expansion of the horse racing club, spelled the end for the circuit and it would be demolished soon after holding its final race meeting in December that year.

== History ==
Graham McRae at the Levin Motor Racing Circuit, 1970

Until the 1950s, New Zealand was without a permanent motor racing facility. Races typically took place either on temporary street circuits in city centres or on airfields. The appetite for change came about when British expat Ron Frost stumbled upon the Levin Racecourse whilst house hunting in Levin. Together with local figures such as such as Syd Jensen, Arnold Stafford, Vic Hudson, Les Burnham, Welwyn Wylde and Keith Wyness, he founded the Levin Motor Racing Club. After 18 months of discussions, approval was granted to break ground on a brand new race facility on the grounds of the horse racing club.

Construction began in August 1955 with Frost having based the design of the track on that of Brands Hatch in the England. Construction was completed in January 1956 and the facility would host its first race meeting on January 14 that year. Whilst based on Brands Hatch, the flat and simplistic nature of the track contrasted to the Kent tracks flowing elevation. During the first meeting, the track surface disintegrated badly due to poor construction and despite garnering a modest crowd attendance figure of 15,000 (Levin's population at the time was 8,000), a bank loan was required to initiate repairs to the surface. Soon after this, the track settled into a regular racing schedule, boasting at least three major events every year including the annual Levin International. The first such event took place in 1958 and attracted international star drivers such as Jack Brabham, Archie Scott-Brown, Roy Salvadori and Stuart Lewis-Evans as well as local talent such as Bruce McLaren.

By 1960, the track width was widened by 2 m (6.6 ft). In addition, the track would be extended from 1.448 to 1.770 km (0.900 to 1.100 mi) with the introduction of a sweeper at the end of the main straight and the pitlane would be moved toward the Beach Bend corner. As a result, the circuit complied with international standards and helped lure events such as the annual Tasman Series which would hold its inaugural event at Levin in January 1964. Run under the Vic Hudson Memorial Race, Denny Hulme took the victory honours and the circuit would play host to the series until its dissolvement in 1975. All bar the 1967 event accounted for full championship points.

The track would be revised once more in 1966 with the addition of two new corners in the final section of track which bypassed the Clearways corner. This lengthened the circuit layout from 1.770 to 1.899 km (1.100 to 1.180 mi). The circuit continued to attracted large crowd numbers up until its final days in 1975. The circuit endured only one fatality in its time in operation. Local competitor, Duncan MacKenzie rolled his car at Hokio Bend in April 1961 and was pronounced dead on arrival at Palmerston North Hospital.

=== Demise ===
By the end of 1975, the 20-year lease for the circuit was due to expire. Facilities were in need of repair which the racing club were incapable of paying for. This, as well as the rapid expansion of the horse racing club, spelled the end for the Levin Motor Racing Circuit. It held its final race meeting in December that year and the track would be demolished sooner after.

In 1973, the Manfeild Autocourse would open on the outskirts of Feilding, thus providing a permanent racing facility for the Manawatū–Whanganui region that continues to operate to the present day.

== Layout history ==
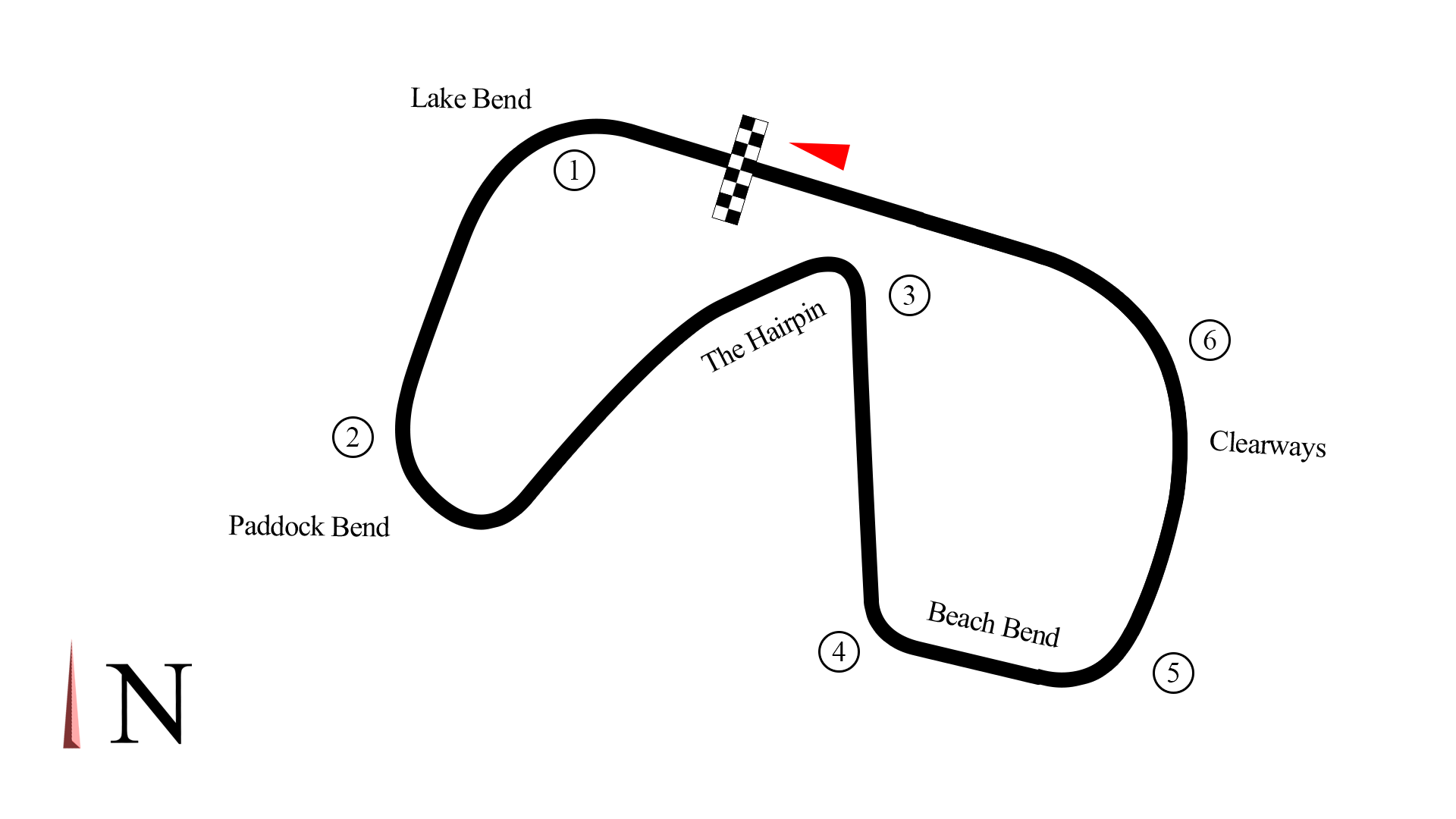
The Levin Motor Racing Circuit layout from 1956 to 1959

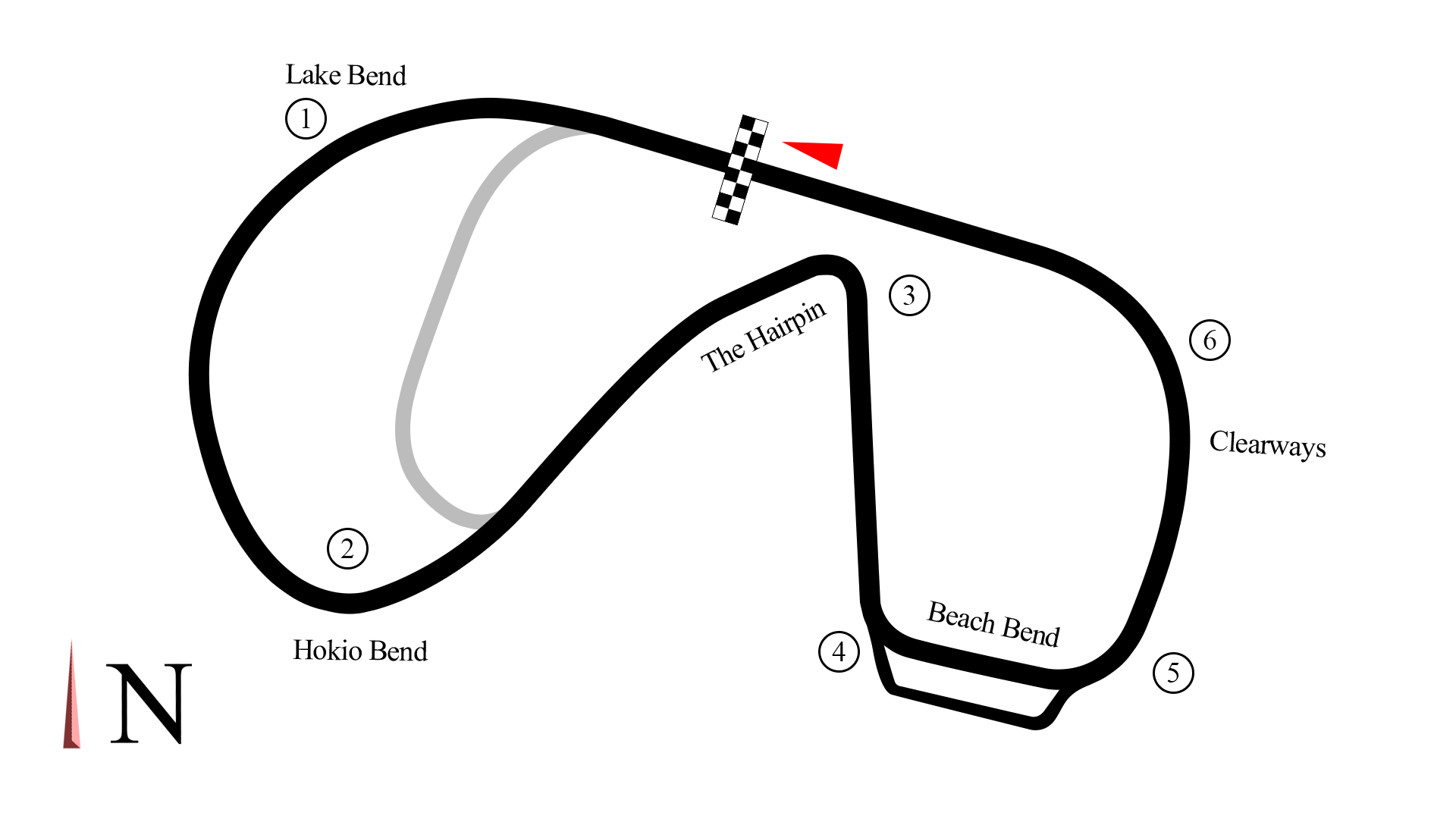
The Levin Motor Racing Circuit layout from 1960 to 1965

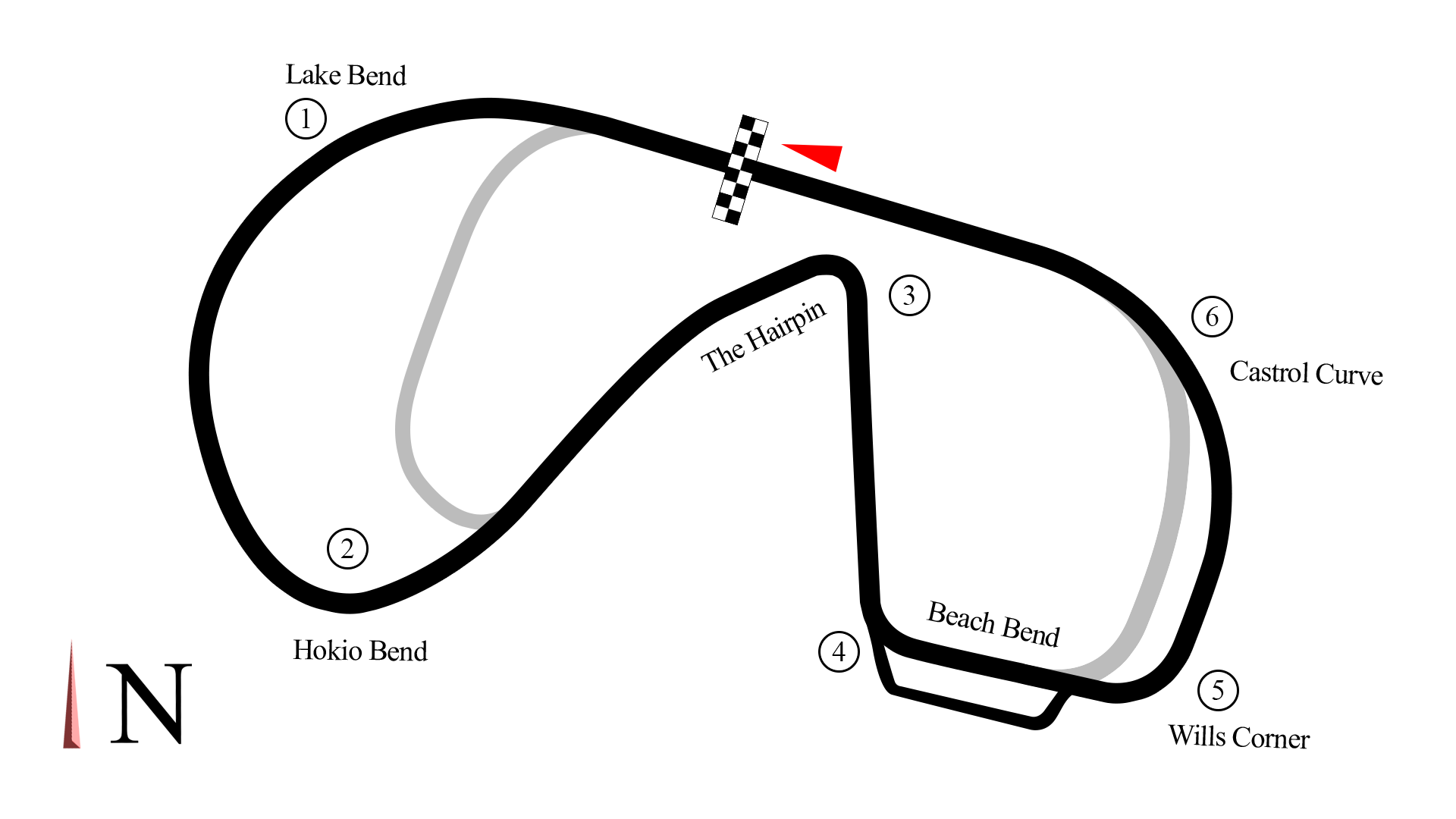
The Levin Motor Racing Circuit layout from 1966 to 1975

== Tasman Series ==
Levin hosted a round of the Tasman Series in every year the series was run. The 1967 event was run as a non-championship race.

Year	Race name	Driver	Car	Entrant
1964	Vic Hudson Memorial Race	(New Zealand) Denny Hulme	Repco Brabham BT4 Coventry Climax	Motor Racing Developments
1965	Levin International	(United Kingdom) Jim Clark	Lotus 32B Coventry Climax	Team Lotus
1966	Levin International	(United Kingdom) Richard Attwood	BRM P261	Owen Racing Organisation
1967	Levin International	(United Kingdom) Jim Clark	Lotus 33 Coventry Climax	Team Lotus
1968	Levin International	(New Zealand) Chris Amon	Dino 246 Tasmania	C. Amon
1969	Levin International	(New Zealand) Chris Amon	Dino 246 Tasmania	Scuderia Veloce
1970	Levin International	(New Zealand) Graeme Lawrence	Dino 246 Tasmania	
1971	Levin International	(New Zealand) Graham McRae	McLaren M10B-Chevrolet	Crown Lynn
1972	Levin International	(New Zealand) Graham McRae	Leda GM1-Chevrolet	Crown Lynn
1973	Levin International	(New Zealand) Graham McRae	McRae GM1-Chevrolet	STP
1974	Peter Stuyvesant Intl. Motor Race	(Australia) Johnnie Walker	Lola T330-Repco Holden	Johnnie Walker
1975	Levin International	(New Zealand) Graeme Lawrence	Lola T332-Chevrolet	Marlboro/Singapore Airlines

== Lap records ==
The fastest official race lap records at the Levin Motor Racing Circuit are listed as:

Category	Time	Driver	Vehicle	Date
Full Circuit (1966–1975): 1.899 km (1.180 mi)
Formula 5000	0:43.400	(New Zealand) Graham McRae	McRae GM2	5 January 1974
Formula One	0:45.700	(Austria) Jochen Rindt	Lotus 49T	11 January 1969
Full Circuit (1960–1965): 1.770 km (1.100 mi)
Formula Two	0:49.900	(United Kingdom) Jim Clark	Lotus 32B	16 January 1965

== See also ==
- List of motor racing tracks
