= Australian One and a Half Litre Championship =

- Category: Open Wheel Racing
- Country: Australia
- Inaugural season: 1964
- Folded: 1968
- Last Drivers' champion: Max Stewart; Garrie Cooper

The Australian One and a Half Litre Championship was a CAMS sanctioned national motor racing title contested annually from 1964 to 1968. It was open to drivers of cars complying with the Australian 1½ Litre Formula which specified open wheel racing cars fitted with unsupercharged engines using commercially available fuel and limited to 1500cc capacity. The title was staged over a single race in the first two years and over a series of races in the last three.

== Results ==
Year	Champion	Car
1964	Greg Cusack	Repco Brabham Ford
1965	Bib Stillwell	Repco Brabham Ford
1966	John Harvey	Repco Brabham Ford
1967	Max Stewart	Rennmax Ford
1968	Max Stewart; Garrie Cooper	Rennmax Ford; Elfin Ford

== Bibliography ==
- CAMS Manual of Motor Sport, 1964
- Australian Motor Sport, October 1964
- CAMS Manual of Motor Sport, 1965
- Sports Car World, June 1965
- CAMS Manual of Motor Sport, 1966
- Racing Car News, January 1967
- CAMS Manual of Motor Sport, 1967
- Racing Car News, January 1968
- CAMS Manual of Motor Sport, 1968
- Racing Car News, December 1968
- www.camsmanual.com.au
