= Garrie Cooper =

Australian racing driver (1935–1982)

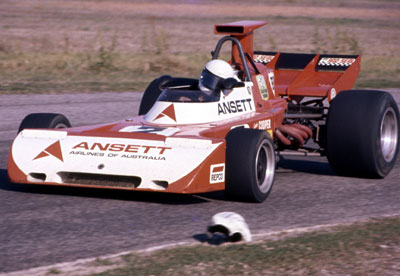
- Cooper in his Elfin MR5 at the Surfers Paradise round of the 1972 Australian Drivers' Championship
- Nationality: (Australia) Australian
- Born: 22 December 1935 Glenelg, South Australia
- Died: 25 April 1982 (aged 46) Adelaide, South Australia
- Retired: 1980

Australian Drivers' Championship
- Years active: 1962–80
- Teams: Elfin Sports Cars/Ansett Team Elfin
- Best finish: 3rd in 1973 Australian Drivers' Championship

Previous series
- 1966–68 1969–75 1971 1974–75: Australian 1½ Litre Championship; Tasman Series; Australian Formula 2 Ch. Australian Sports Car Championship

Championship titles
- 1968 1968 1975: Singapore Grand Prix; Australian 1½ Litre Championship; Australian Sports Car Championship

Garrie Clifford Cooper (22 December 1935 – 25 April 1982) was the founder of the highly successful Elfin Sports Cars and a competitive racing driver in his own right, winning the 1968 Singapore Grand Prix, the 1968 Australian 1½ Litre Championship, and the 1975 Australian Sports Car Championship — all in Elfin cars of his own design.

== Elfin Sports Cars ==
Cooper established Elfin Sports Cars in 1959 with the help of his father Cliff Cooper. The first Elfin, the Streamliner, was a front-engined sports car. The prototype was completed in October 1959 and was followed by 22 production versions, the last of which was delivered in 1963.

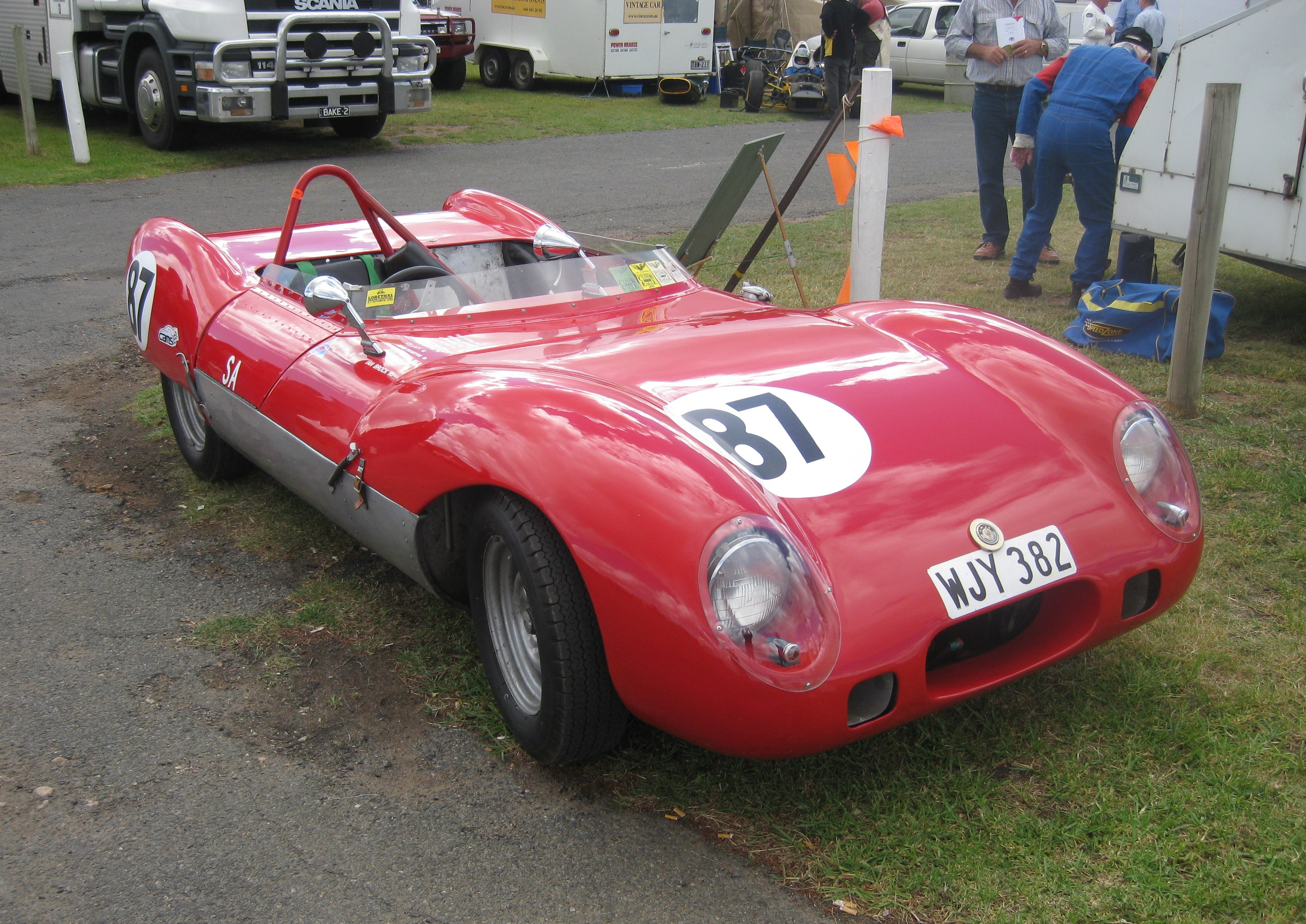
Elfin Streamliner

248 Elfins of various models had been completed by 1983.

== Racing career ==
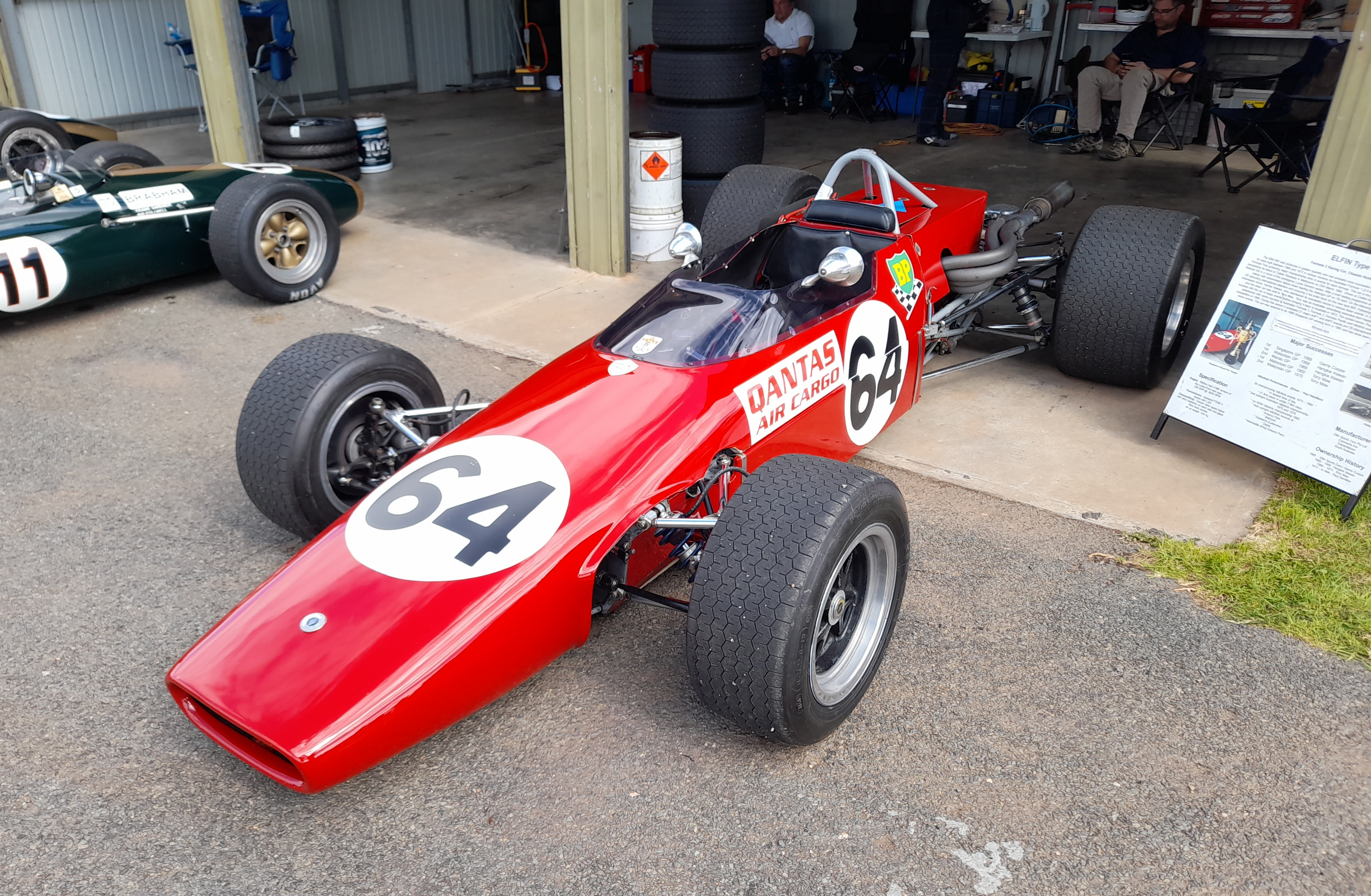
Cooper won the 1968 Singapore Grand Prix driving this Elfin 600. The car is pictured in 2021.

Cooper won the 1968 Singapore Grand Prix and the 1968 Australian 1½ Litre Championship driving an Elfin 600. He also won the 1975 Australian Sports Car Championship with an Elfin MS7.

During the 1978 Australian Grand Prix at the fast Sandown Raceway in Melbourne, Cooper suffered a broken leg in a high-speed crash while driving his own Elfin MR8 Formula 5000. The car was destroyed after leaving the track and crashing into the horse track rails on the back straight at over 250 km/h (155 mph). Cooper's explanation for the high speed crash was that something broke on the car which sent him spearing into the fence.

In 1980, Cooper designed and built the first open wheel car in Australia to use ground effect aerodynamics, the Elfin MR9 (the MR9 remains the only F5000 ever constructed using ground effect). This car made its race début in Cooper's hands at the 1980 Australian Grand Prix at Melbourne's Calder Park Raceway. Originally to be driven by French Formula One driver Didier Pironi who had experience driving ground effects F1 cars, Cooper himself decided to drive the car as it had only been completed before practice and did not set a qualifying time. Pironi and Cooper's Ansett Team Elfin teammate John Bowe each drove an Elfin MR8 in the race, with Pironi finishing in third place, four laps down on the Williams FW07B Formula One car of 1980 World Champion Alan Jones.

John Bowe also drove the MR9 on limited occasions and felt that with the ground effects it had a lot of potential. However, Elfin were finding out what others had found with ground effect in that it required stronger suspension components to cope with the higher downforce generated in the corners compared to the conventional F5000's with Bowe reportedly receiving a fright during a race at Sandown in 1981 when the front suspension broke on the car. In the end, the true potential of the Chevrolet V8 powered MR9 was never reached and its racing life was limited to just one year as F5000 racing was phased out of Australian motorsport at the end of 1981.

After limited appearances following the 1980 Australian Grand Prix, Cooper retired from racing following the 1981 season.

== Health issues ==
In 1971, Cooper was admitted to hospital to have an artificial heart valve implanted. Due to the metallic material of the valve, Cooper had to take anti-coagulants, which caused concern from CAMS (the Confederation of Australian Motor Sport, Australia's motorsport ruling body), but after extensive lobbying from Cooper and countless letters supporting Cooper from his heart specialist, he was able to regain his racing license and continued his racing career.

== Death ==
Early on Anzac Day (25 April) 1982, while working on a customer's car, Cooper died due to a ruptured aortic aneurysm.

== Ansett Team Elfin drivers ==
Drivers who raced Elfin cars as teammate to Cooper include John McCormack, Vern Schuppan, John Bowe, Larry Perkins, 1976 Formula One World Champion James Hunt, and Didier Pironi.

== Career results ==
Season	Series	Position	Car	Team
1962	Australian Drivers' Championship	18th	Elfin Formula Junior Ford	Elfin Sports Cars
1964	Australian Drivers' Championship	8th	Elfin Mono Mk.1 Ford	Elfin Sports Cars
1965	Australian Drivers' Championship	9th	Elfin Mono Mk.2B Ford	Elfin Sports Cars
1966	Australian Drivers' Championship	8th	Elfin Mono Mk.2B Ford	Elfin Sports Cars
1966	Australian 1½ Litre Championship	4th	Elfin Mono Mk.2B Ford	Elfin Sports Cars
1967	Australian Drivers' Championship	12th	Elfin Mono Mk.2B Ford	Elfin Sports Cars
1967	Australian 1½ Litre Championship	3rd	Elfin Mono Mk.2B Ford	Elfin Sports Cars
1968	Australian Drivers' Championship	5th	Elfin 600B Ford	Elfin Sports Cars
1968	Australian 1½ Litre Championship	1st	Elfin 600B Ford	Elfin Sports Cars
1969	Australian Drivers' Championship	6th	Elfin 600C Repco	Elfin Sports Cars
1970	Australian Drivers' Championship	4th	Elfin 600D Repco	Elfin Sports Cars
1971	Australian Drivers' Championship	11th	Elfin 600D Ford	Elfin Sports Cars
1971	Australian Formula 2 Championship	5th	Elfin 600D Ford	Elfin Sports Cars
1972	Australian Drivers' Championship	9th	Elfin MR5 Repco Holden	Ansett Team Elfin
1973	Tasman Series	12th	Elfin MR5 Repco Holden	Ansett Team Elfin
1973	Australian Drivers' Championship	3rd	Elfin MR5 Repco Holden	Ansett Team Elfin
1974	Tasman Series	14th	Elfin MR5 Repco Holden	Ansett Team Elfin
1974	Australian Drivers' Championship	4th	Elfin MR5 Repco Holden	Ansett Team Elfin
1974	Australian Sports Car Championship	2nd	Elfin MS7 Repco Holden	Ansett Team Elfin
1975	Tasman Series	12th	Elfin MR5 Repco Holden	Ansett Team Elfin
1975	Australian Drivers' Championship	11th	Elfin MR5 Repco Holden	Ansett Team Elfin
1975	Australian Sports Car Championship	1st	Elfin MS7 Repco Holden	Ansett Team Elfin
1976	Australian Drivers' Championship	7th	Elfin MR8C Chevrolet	Ansett Team Elfin
1977	Rothmans International Series	6th	Elfin MR8C Chevrolet	Ansett Team Elfin
1977	Australian Drivers' Championship	7th	Elfin MR8C Chevrolet	Ansett Team Elfin
1978	Australian Drivers' Championship	8th	Elfin MR8C Chevrolet	Ansett Team Elfin
1980	Australian Drivers' Championship	20th	Elfin MR9 Chevrolet	Ansett Team Elfin
