= 1974 Tasman Series =

Motor racing competition

Seasons
- ← 1973 1975 →

The 1974 Tasman Series (formally the Tasman Championship for Drivers) was an international motor racing competition which commenced on 5 January and ended on 23 February 1974 after eight races. The championship, which was the eleventh Tasman Championship, was open to Racing cars complying with the Tasman Formula. The winner was awarded the Tasman Cup.

The championship was won by Peter Gethin of the United Kingdom, driving a Chevron B24 Chevrolet.

== Schedule ==
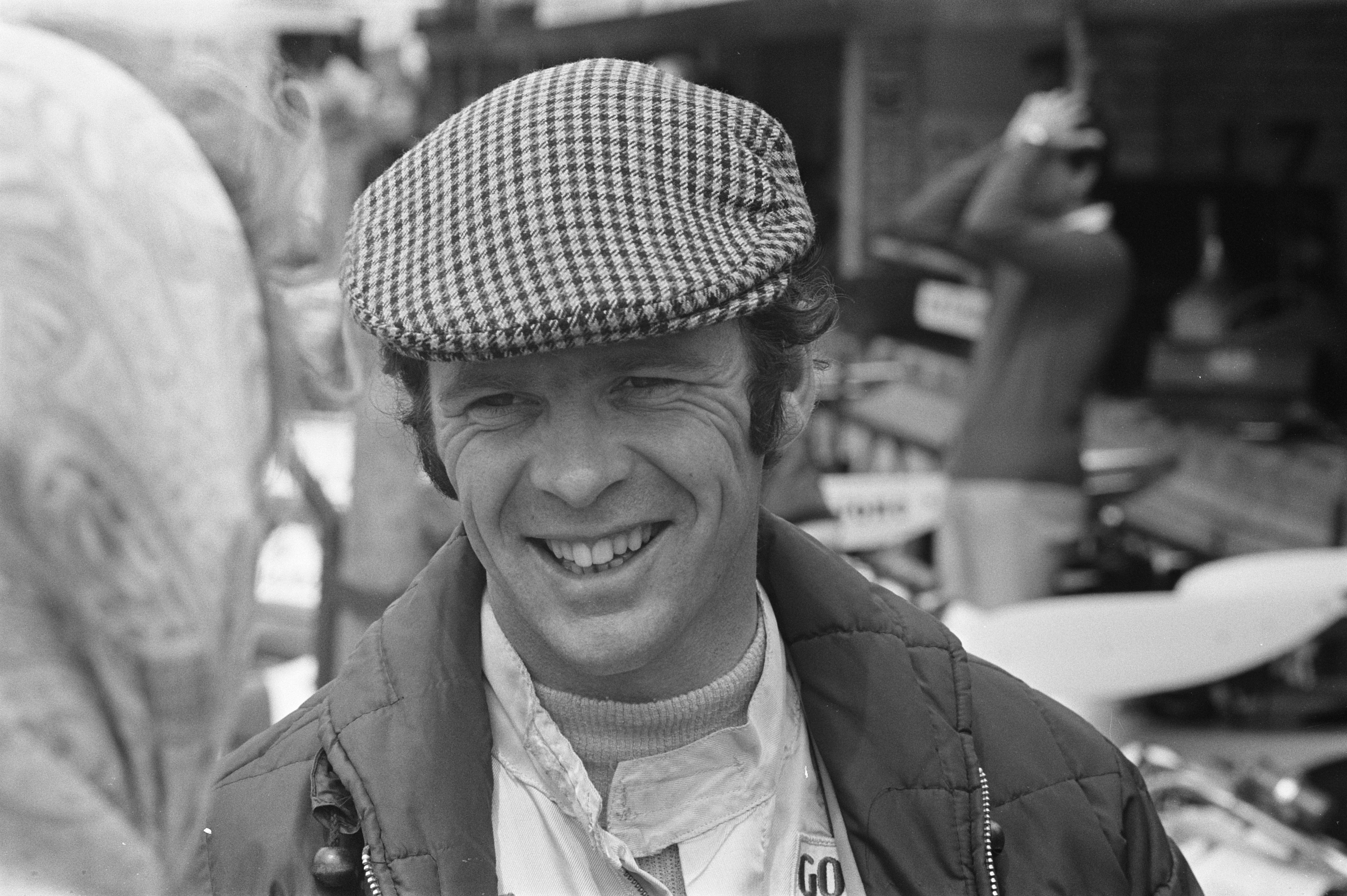
The championship was won by Peter Gethin (pictured in 1971)

The championship was contested over eight rounds with each round comprising a single race.

Round		Name	Circuit	Date	Winning driver	Winning car	Winning entrant	Report
New Zealand	1	Peter Stuyvesant International Motor Race	Levin	5 January	(Australia) Johnnie Walker	Lola T330 Repco Holden	Johnnie Walker	Report
New Zealand	2	Air New Zealand International Race	Pukekohe	12 January	(United Kingdom) Peter Gethin	Chevron B24 Chevrolet	Chevron Racing Team VDS	Report
New Zealand	3	Peter Stuyvesant New Zealand Grand Prix for the Lady Wigram Memorial Trophy	Wigram	19 January	(Australia) John McCormack	Elfin MR5 Repco Holden	Ansett Team Elfin	Report
New Zealand	4	Teretonga International	Teretonga	26 January	(Australia) Max Stewart	Lola T330 Chevrolet	Max Stewart Motors	Report
Australia	5	Peter Stuyvesant $100,000	Oran Park	3 February	(Australia) Max Stewart	Lola T330 Chevrolet	Max Stewart Motors	Report
Australia	6	Peter Stuyvesant $100,000	Surfers Paradise	10 February	(Belgium) Teddy Pilette	Chevron B24 Chevrolet	Chevron Racing Team VDS	Report
Australia	7	Peter Stuyvesant $100,000	Sandown	17 February	(United Kingdom) Peter Gethin	Chevron B24 Chevrolet	Chevron Racing Team VDS	Report
Australia	8	Peter Stuyvesant $100,000	Adelaide	23 February	(Australia) Warwick Brown	Lola T332 Chevrolet	Pat Burke Racing	Report

== Points system ==
Championship points were awarded for race positions at each race on the following basis:

Position	1	2	3	4	5	6
Points	9	6	4	3	2	1

Points from all races were counted towards each driver's championship total.

== Championship standings ==
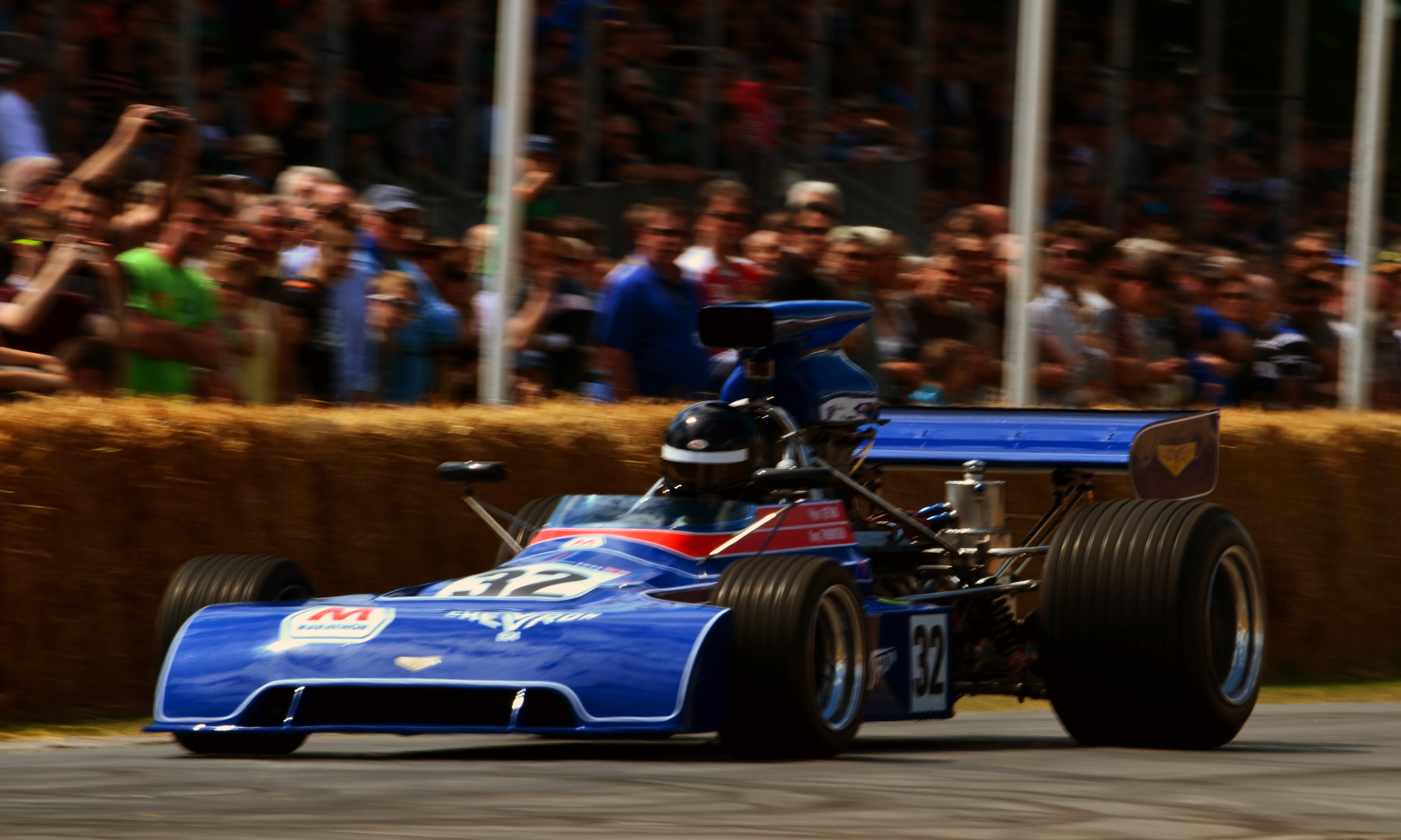
Peter Gethin won the title driving a Chevron B24 similar to the example pictured above.

Pos	Driver	Car	Entrant	Lev	Puk	Wig	Ter	Ora	Sur	San	Ade	Pts
1	(United Kingdom) Peter Gethin	Chevron B24 Chevrolet	Chevron Racing Team VDS	4	1	3	5	5	2	1	2	41
2	(Australia) Max Stewart	Lola T330 Chevrolet	Max Stewart Motors	3	5	Ret	1	1	Ret	5	Ret	26
3	(Belgium) Teddy Pilette	Chevron B24 Chevrolet	Chevron Racing Team VDS	Ret	4	2	Ret	6	1	4	Ret	22
4	(Australia) Johnnie Walker	Lola T330 Repco Holden	J. Walker	1	7	Ret	Ret	2	5	3	Ret	21
=	(Australia) John McCormack	Elfin MR5 Repco Holden	Ansett Team Elfin	Ret	2	1	Ret	4	4	10	Ret	21
6	(Australia) Warwick Brown	Lola T332 Chevrolet	Pat Burke Racing	6	6	Ret	4	3	7	6	1	19
7	(New Zealand) Graham McRae	McRae GM2 Chevrolet	Crown Lynn	Ret	Ret	Ret	2	DSQ	6	2	7	13
8	(New Zealand) David Oxton	Begg FM5 Chevrolet	David Oxton Motor Racing	7	3	4	10	Ret	9	8	5	9
=	(New Zealand) Graeme Lawrence	Lola T332 Chevrolet	Singapore Airlines – WIX	11	Ret	6	3	7	11	Ret	3	9
10	(New Zealand) Allan McCully	Begg FM5 Chevrolet	A. McCully	2	Ret	7	6					7
=	(Australia) Frank Matich	Matich A53 Repco Holden	Frank Matich Racing						3	Ret	4	7
12	(New Zealand) Ken Smith	March 732 Ford	Air New Zealand	5	8	10	8					2
=	(New Zealand) Garry Pedersen	McLaren M18 Chevrolet	Hi-Fi Radio Racing Team	DNS	12	5	7	Ret	DSQ	Ret	Ret	2
14	(Australia) Garrie Cooper	Elfin MR5 Repco Holden	Ansett Team Elfin					9	8	7	6	1
Pos	Driver	Car	Entrant	Lev	Puk	Wig	Ter	Ora	Sur	San	Ade	Pts

Colour	Result
Gold	Winner
Silver	Second place
Bronze	Third place
Green	Points classification
Blue	Non-points classification
Blue	Non-classified finish (NC)
Purple	Retired, not classified (Ret)
Red	Did not qualify (DNQ)
Red	Did not pre-qualify (DNPQ)
Black	Disqualified (DSQ)
White	Did not start (DNS)
White	Withdrew (WD)
White	Race cancelled (C)
Blank	Did not practice (DNP)
Blank	Did not arrive (DNA)
Blank	Excluded (EX)
