= Spencer Martin (racing driver) =

Australian racing driver (born 1939)

- Nationality: Australian
- Born: Spencer John Martin; 28 March 1939 (age 87) Ryde, New South Wales, Australia

Australian Drivers' Championship
- Years active: 1965–1967
- Teams: Scuderia Veloce; Bob Jane Racing
- Starts: 14
- Wins: 6
- Best finish: 1st in 1966 and 1967 Australian Drivers' Championship

Previous series
- 1966–67: Tasman Series

Championship titles
- 1966 1967: Australian Drivers' Championship; Australian Drivers' Championship

Spencer John Martin (born 28 March 1939) is an Australian championship-winning racing driver. Martin's short career was highlighted by two Australian Drivers' Championship victories in 1966 and 1967, racing for Bob Jane Racing.

== Racing career ==
After spectating at the Mount Druitt circuit in the late 1950s, Martin entered his first motor race in 1960 in a self-built car at Gnoo Blas circuit. A mechanic by trade, Martin moved through the ranks through his contacts in the trade, racing a PRAD sports car and a successful Holden touring car.

Martin's break came when he defeated Norm Beechey in a touring car race. Beechey's entrant, David McKay offered Martin a drive with McKay's Scuderia Veloce team at the 1963 Armstrong 500 co-driving with Brian Muir. He achieved a class victory in the 1964 Armstrong 500, sharing a Vauxhall Viva with Bill Brown.

Martin became a part of Scuderia Veloce as a mechanic and driver, acting as lead mechanic when the team brought in international drivers for the Tasman Series. He raced the team's Repco Brabham BT11A as well as a Ferrari 250LM sports car, winning the 1965 Six Hour Le Mans with McKay in the Ferrari. Martin also placed third in the Italian car in the Australian Tourist Trophy in both 1965 and 1966. He left the team in mid-1966 after a top-ten championship finish in the 1966 Tasman Series and found employment with Bob Jane's team. Martin drove Jane's Brabham BT11 to victory in the 1966 and 1967 Australian Drivers' Championships. Martin retired at his peak after the 1967 season to begin a family, although he returned sporadically for Touring Car endurance races including the 1969 Datsun Three Hour, in which he drove for the Holden Dealer Team.

In 1979, Martin returned to Scuderia Veloce, racing a basically stock standard Volvo 242 GT in the 1979 Hardie-Ferodo 1000 at Bathurst with racer/journalist David McKay. After starting a credible 47th in the 63 car field, the Volvo eventually covered 129 of the 163 laps, finishing 20th outright and fifth in the 2001cc - 3000cc Class. This drive led to historic sports car racing overseas where Martin became a fixture in the 1980s and 1990s in Europe and North America. Martin made a return to Bathurst in 1993, co-driving with his son Matthew and New Zealander Dave McMillan in a Bob Holden-entered Toyota Corolla in the Tooheys 1000. Unfortunately for the trio who qualified their Corolla in 40th place, their race ended after just 46 laps.

Martin continues to race historics.

== Results ==
Season	Title	Position	Car	Entrant
1965	Australian Tourist Trophy	3rd	Ferrari 250LM	Scuderia Veloce
1965	Australian Drivers' Championship	3rd	Repco Brabham BT11A Coventry Climax	Scuderia Veloce
1966	Tasman Series	7th	Repco Brabham BT11A Coventry Climax	Scuderia Veloce
1966	Australian Tourist Trophy	3rd	Ferrari 250LM	Scuderia Veloce
1966	Australian Drivers' Championship	1st	Repco Brabham BT11A Coventry Climax	Bob Jane Racing
1967	Australian Drivers' Championship	1st	Repco Brabham BT11A Coventry Climax	Bob Jane Racing

Sporting positions
Preceded by Bib Stillwell	Winner of the Australian Drivers' Championship; 1966 and 1967	Succeeded by Kevin Bartlett
