= Australian National Formula =

Australian motor racing category

The Australian National Formula (often abbreviated to ANF) was an Australian motor racing category which was introduced by the Confederation of Australian Motor Sport in 1964 and remained current until the end of 1969. It had replaced Formula Libre as the Australian premier racing formula.

The Australian National Formula specified single seat racing cars fitted with unsupercharged engines of no greater than 2.5 litres capacity running on commercially available fuel. This encouraged the use of engines such as the Coventry Climax FPF unit which had been prominent in the 2.5 litre FIA Formula One category prior to the downsizing of that formula for 1961. The Australian National Formula was renamed for 1970, officially becoming Australian Formula 1 (AF1).

The Australian Drivers' Championship (for the CAMS Gold Star award) and the Australian Grand Prix were both open to drivers of Australian National Formula cars throughout the life of the formula, i.e. from 1964 to 1969. The formula was also utilised for the Tasman Cup series during these years.

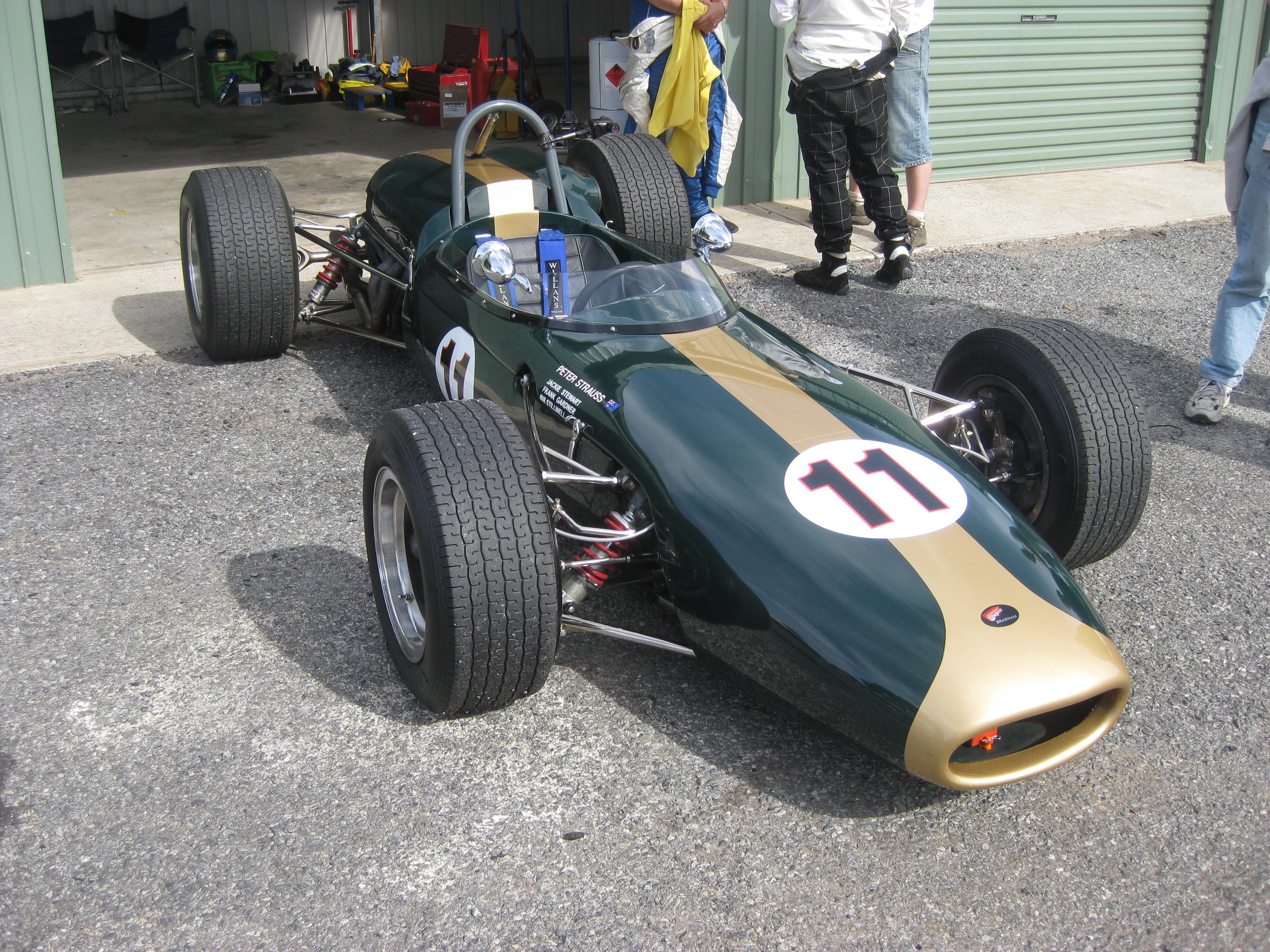
Repco Brabham BT11A, an Australian National Formula car
