= Elfin Type 100 Mono =

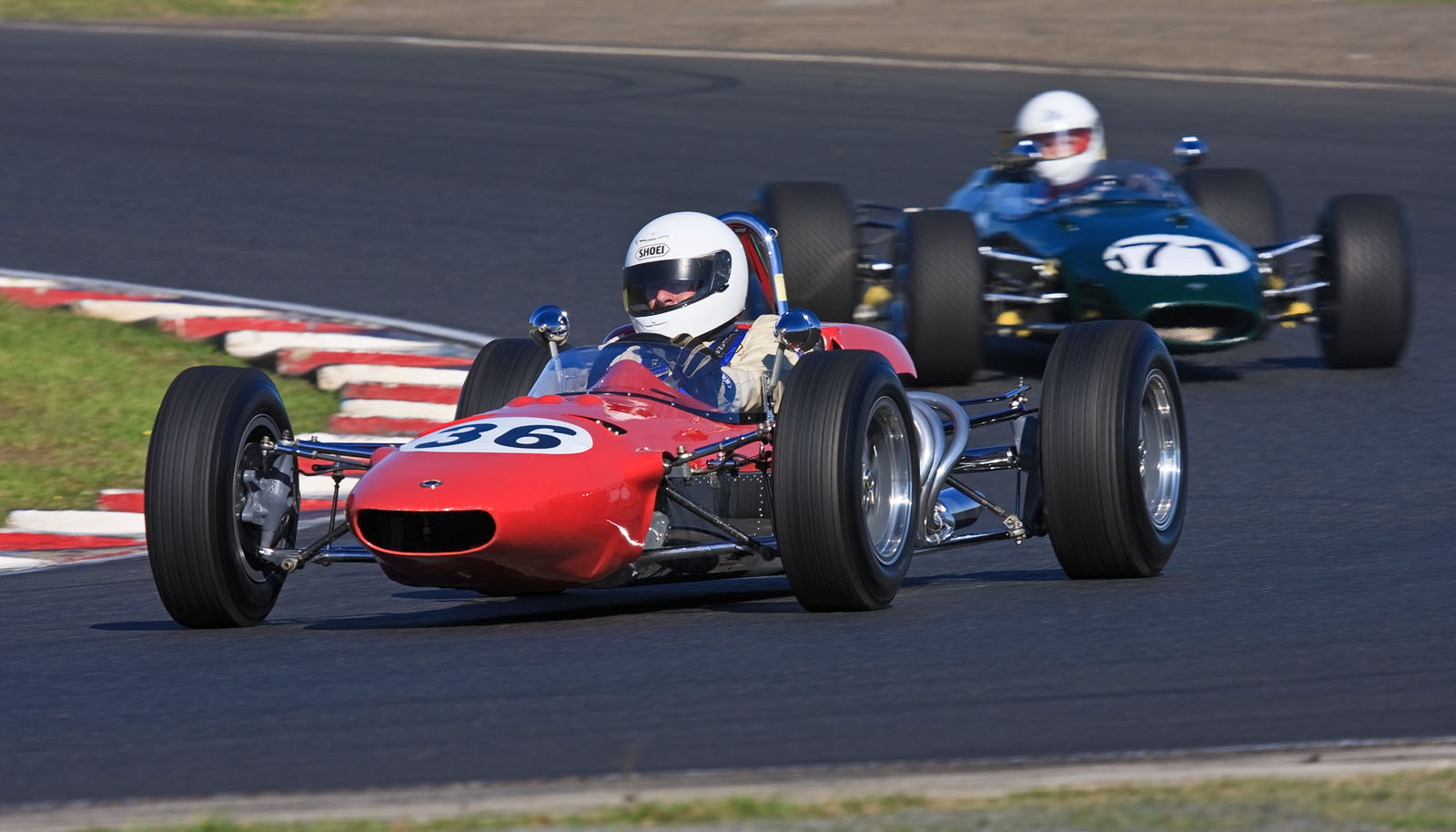

Overview
- Manufacturer: Elfin Sports Cars
- Production: 1964-1969; 19 built
- Designer: Garrie Cooper

Body and chassis
- Class: Australian 1½ Litre Formula

Powertrain
- Engine: Lotus Twin Cam; Clisby V6; Ford 1500; Ford Cosworth 1100

Chronology
- Predecessor: Formula Junior / Catalina
- Successor: Elfin 600

The Elfin Type 100 Mono is an Australian 1½ Litre Formula racing car produced from 1964-1969 by Elfin Sports Cars. The name "Mono" refers to the fact that it was constructed upon a monocoque design.

== Development ==
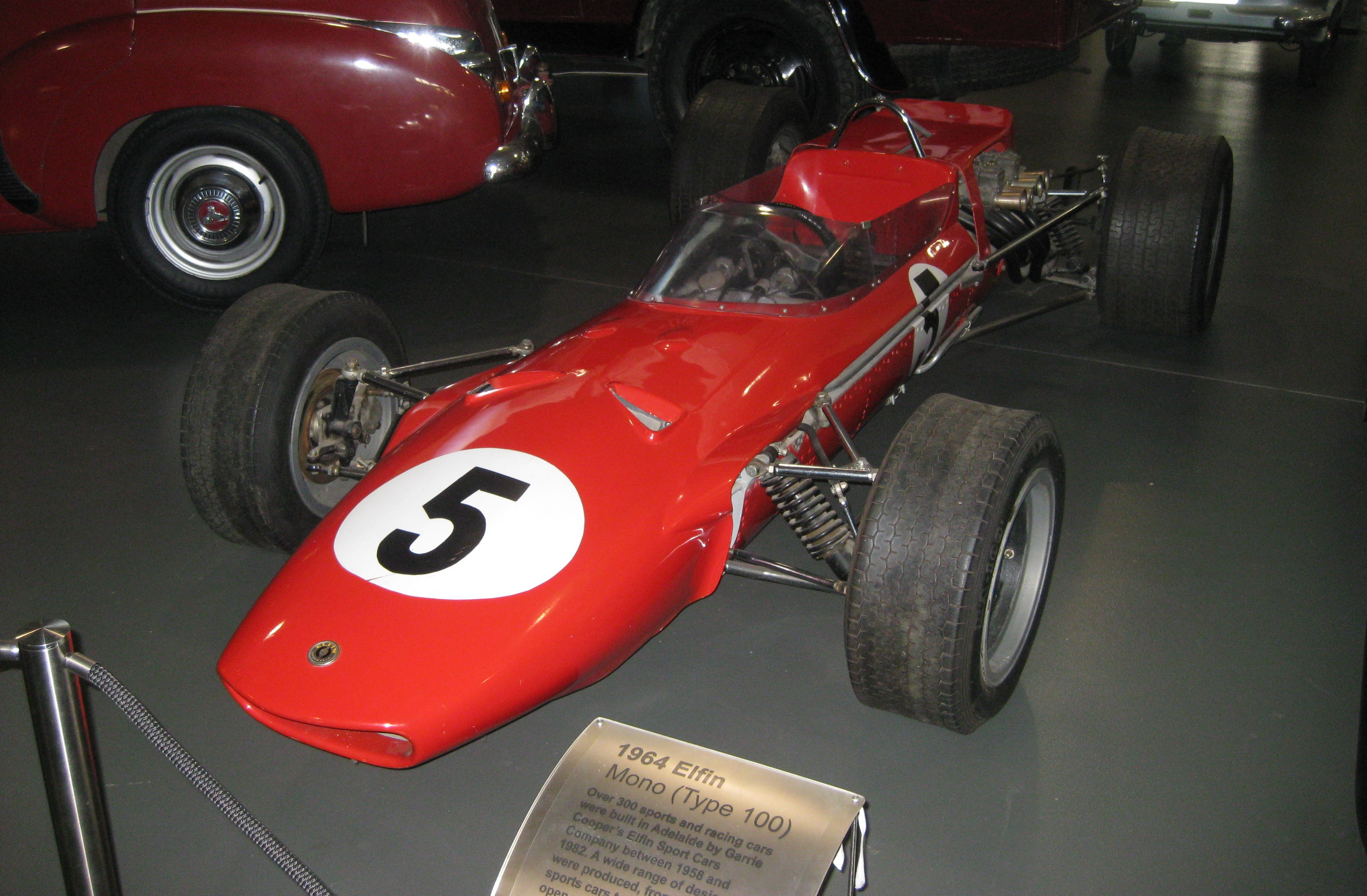
Elfin Type 100 Mono at the National Motor Museum at Birdwood in South Australia

In 1963, Garrie Cooper began work on a revolutionary monocoque design of a car intended to dominate the newly created Australian 1½ Litre capacity class. Lotus Cars had already built the Formula 1 monocoque under the direction of Colin Chapman but the idea was still in its infancy so Cooper had only vague ideas of the design. The monocoque build removed the need for the traditional "Superleggera" tube frame chassis and harnessed a very light sheet steel frame to which aluminum panels were riveted for a very stiff structure. The finished structure weighed approximately 80 kg less than the tube framed Elfin Catalina it replaced. Uniquely, the hollow section of the body was sealed off to serve as the petrol tank. The Elfin Mono eventually made its debut at the August 1964 Melbourne Racing Car show and orders quickly followed.
