= Australian 1½ Litre Formula =

Motor racing category

The Australian 1½ Litre Formula was a motor racing category which was current in Australia from 1964 to 1968. The formula specified racing cars with four-cylinder unsupercharged engines using commercially available fuel and limited to 1500cc capacity. It occupied the second tier in Australian formula car racing, below the Australian National Formula (which specified a 2500cc engine capacity limit) and above Australian Formula 2 (1100cc) and Australian Formula 3 (1000cc).

Drivers of Australian 1½ Litre Formula cars contested their own national title, the Australian 1½ Litre Championship and were also eligible to compete alongside Australian National Formula drivers in the Australian Drivers' Championship, the Australian Grand Prix and the Tasman Cup Series. The Australian 1½ Litre Formula was discontinued as at the end of 1968 and the engine capacity limit for Australian Formula 2 was raised from 1100cc to 1600cc for 1969.
