= 1967 Rothmans 12 Hour =

Car endurance race

Coordinates: 28°0′59″S 153°22′34″E

The 1967 Rothmans 12 Hour was an endurance race for Sports Racing Cars & Improved Production Cars. The event was staged at the Surfers Paradise International Raceway in Queensland, Australia on 3 September 1967.

== Class Structure ==
The 27 starters competed in four classes as follows:

- Sports Racing Cars Over 2000cc
- Sports Racing Cars Under 2000cc
- Improved Production Cars Over 2000cc
- Improved Production Cars Under 2000cc

This was the second of two Rothmans 12 Hour sports car races to be held at the Surfers Paradise circuit before the event was downsized to become the Surfers Paradise 6 Hour in 1968.

== Results ==
Position	Drivers	No.	Car	Entrant	Class pos.	Class	Laps
1	Bill Brown; Greg Cusack	4	Ferrari 250LM	Scuderia Veloce	1	SR + 2000	490
2	Paul Hawkins; Jackie Epstein	1	Lola T70 Mk 3 Chevrolet	Epstein Enterprises	2	SR + 2000	468
3	Alan Hamilton; Glyn Scott	9	Porsche 906 Spyder	Porsche Distributors	1	SR - 2000	460
4	John Roxburgh; Doug Whiteford	28	Datsun 1600	Datsun Racing Team	1	IP - 2000	447
5	Bob Holden; Don Holland	8	Morris Cooper S	BMC (Australia) Pty Ltd	2	SR - 2000	437
6	Charlie Smith; Noel Hall		MGB	Smith BMC	2	IP - 2000	427
7	Gerry Lister; David Seldon	15	Volvo 122S	Wynns Friction Proofing	3	SR - 2000	424
8	R Kearns; B Lawler; C Wear	27	Volvo 122S	Nat Zanardo Motors	3	IP - 2000	418
9	Ron Thorp; R Strong	17	AC Cobra	Ron Thorp's Bargain Barn	1	IP + 2000	416
10	John Keran; Colin Bond; M Winkless		Volvo P1800S	John Keran	4	IP - 2000	416
11	Barry Ferguson; Max Stahl	11	MGB Fastback	Racing Car News	4	SR - 2000	412
12	Harry Cape; I Ferguson		Triumph GT6	HC Cape	5	IP - 2000	402
13	D Hallam; Robin Pare		Ford Anglia Super	Don Elliott	5	SR - 2000	374
14	Graham Wood; D Haldane; B Leer		TVR Grantura	Peter Owen Racing	6	SR - 2000	367
15	Max de Jersey; Bill Birmingham; A Shaw		Holden FJ	Race Car Engineering	3	SR + 2000	344
16	Peter Whitelaw; K Woolf; P Ganderton	18	Daimler SP250	Peter E Whitelaw	2	IP + 2000	300
17	Phil Barnes; J Leighton		Morris Cooper S	Phil Barnes	7	SR - 2000	238
DNF	Kevin Bartlett; Doug Chivas		Alfa Romeo GTA	Alec Mildren		?	?
DNF	Ross Bond; Digby Cooke; Bill Stanley		Austin-Healey 3000			?	?
DNF	B Breen; D Frazer		Austin-Healey Sprite			?	?
DNF	B Tapsall; Henk Woelders		Datsun 1600	Datsun Racing Team		IP - 2000	?
DNF	D Moline; I Hindmarsh		Elfin			?	?
DNF	G Munyard; R Crawford; A Calvert		Holden 48/215			?	?
DNF	Bill Gates; Jim Bertram		Lotus Elan			?	?
DNF	Doug Macarthur; Alec Macarthur		Lotus Elan			?	?
DNF	Brian Foley; John French	7	MG Midget	BMC (Australia) Pty Ltd		?	?
DNF	Harry Gapps; R Drane		Renault R8 Gordini			?	?
