= 1969 Australian Grand Prix =

Coordinates: 27°13′41″S 152°57′54″E

- Race 5 of 7 in 1969 Tasman Series
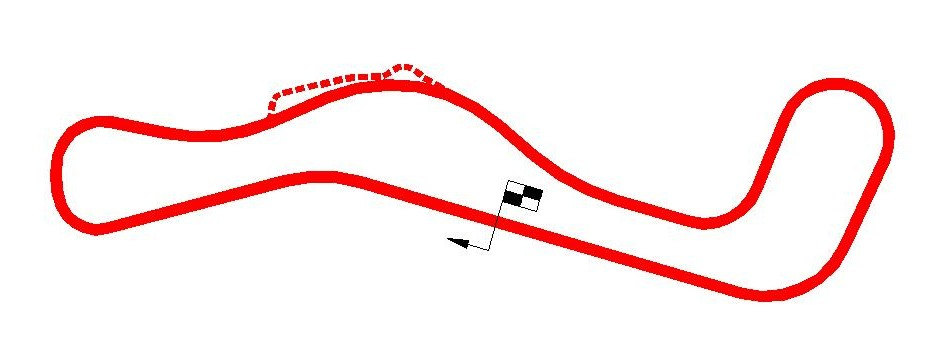

Race details
- Date: 2 February 1969
- Official name: XXXIV Australian Grand Prix
- Location: Lakeside Raceway, Brisbane, Queensland
- Course: Permanent racing facility
- Course length: 2.411 km (1.498 miles)
- Distance: 67 laps, 161.537 km (100.366 miles)
- Weather: Sunny

Pole position
Driver	(New Zealand) Chris Amon	Ferrari
- Time: 0'52.3

Fastest lap
Driver	(New Zealand) Chris Amon	Ferrari
- Time: 0'52.8

Podium
First	(New Zealand) Chris Amon	Ferrari
Second	(United Kingdom) Derek Bell	Ferrari
Third	(Australia) Leo Geoghegan	Lotus-Repco

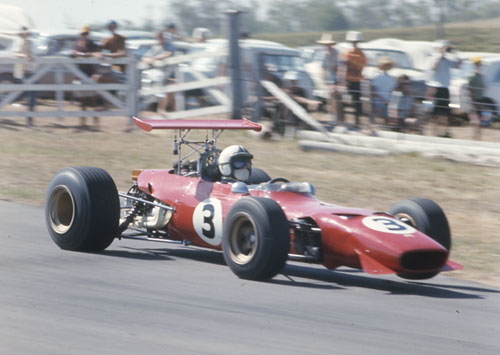
Winner Chris Amon in the Ferrari 246T

The 1969 Australian Grand Prix was a motor race held at Lakeside in Queensland, Australia on 2 February 1969. The race was promoted by the Queensland Motor Sports Club and was open to Australian National Formula cars and Australian Formula 2 cars. It was the thirty fourth Australian Grand Prix and was race five of the 1969 Tasman Championship.

New Zealander Chris Amon started the race from pole position and drove the fastest race lap on his way to a victory, with his British Scuderia Veloce teammate Derek Bell placed second. Leo Geoghegan was the first of the domestic based drivers in third position. Amon also won the 1969 Tasman Series.

== Classification ==
Results as follows:

=== Qualifying ===
Pos	No	Driver	Entrant	Car	Qual	Gap
1	3	(New Zealand) Chris Amon	Scuderia Veloce	Dino 246 Tasmania / Ferrari 2.4L V6	0:52.3	—
2	5	(United Kingdom) Piers Courage	Frank Williams Racing	Brabham BT24 / Cosworth DFW 2.5L V8	0:52.5	+0.2
3	1	(United Kingdom) Graham Hill	Gold Leaf Team Lotus	Lotus 49T / Cosworth DFW 2.5L V8	0:53.0	+0.7
4	4	(United Kingdom) Derek Bell	Scuderia Veloce	Dino 246 Tasmania / Ferrari 2.4L V6	0:53.0	+0.7
5	2	(Austria) Jochen Rindt	Gold Leaf Team Lotus	Lotus 49T / Cosworth DFW 2.5L V8	0:53.0	+0.7
6	6	(Australia) Frank Gardner	Alec Mildren Racing Pty. Ltd.	Mildren Mono / Alfa Romeo 2.5L V8	0:53.4	+1.1
7	7	(Australia) Leo Geoghegan	Geoghegan Racing Division	Lotus 39 / Repco 2.5L V8	0:53.8	+1.5
8	8	(Australia) Kevin Bartlett	Alec Mildren Racing Pty. Ltd.	Brabham BT23D / Alfa Romeo 2.5L V8	0:54.2	+1.9
9	10	(Australia) Niel Allen	N.E. Allen Competition Pty. Ltd.	McLaren M4A / Cosworth FVA 1.6L I4	0:54.8	+2.5
10	9	(Australia) Max Stewart	Alec Mildren Racing Pty. Ltd.	Mildren / Alfa Romeo 1.6L I4	0:55.3	+3.0
11	20	(Australia) Glyn Scott	Glyn Scott Motors	Bowin P3 / Cosworth FVA 1.6L I4	0:55.3	+3.0
12	22	(Australia) Henk Woelders	Bill Patterson Motors	Elfin 600B / Cosworth FVA 1.6L I4	0:55.7	+3.4
13	16	(Australia) Alfredo Costanzo	Argo Racing Pty. Ltd.	McLaren M4A / Cosworth FVA 1.6L I4	0:56.0	+3.7
14	15	(Australia) Col Green	Col Green	Repco Brabham BT16 / Coventry Climax FPF 2.5L I4	0:59.1	+6.8
15	21	(United Kingdom) Malcolm Guthrie	Frank Williams Racing	Brabham BT21B / Cosworth FVA 1.6L I4	0:59.5	+7.2

=== Race ===
Pos	No	Driver	Entrant	Car	Laps	Time
1	3	(New Zealand) Chris Amon	Scuderia Veloce	Dino 246 Tasmania / Ferrari 2.6L V6	67	1h 00m 12.8s
2	4	(United Kingdom) Derek Bell	Scuderia Veloce	Dino 246 Tasmania / Ferrari 2.6L V6	67	1h 00m 36.07s
3	7	(Australia) Leo Geoghegan	Geoghegan Racing Division	Lotus 39 / Repco 2.5L V8	66	
4	1	(United Kingdom) Graham Hill	Gold Leaf Team Lotus	Lotus 49T / Cosworth DFW 2.5L V8	66	
5	10	(Australia) Niel Allen	N.E. Allen Competition Pty. Ltd.	McLaren M4A / Cosworth FVA 1.6L I4	63	
6	9	(Australia) Max Stewart	Alec Mildren Racing Pty. Ltd.	Mildren / Alfa Romeo 1.6L I4	63	
7	21	(United Kingdom) Malcolm Guthrie	Frank Williams Racing	Brabham BT21B / Cosworth FVA 1.6L I4	58	
8	20	(Australia) Glyn Scott	Glyn Scott Motors	Bowin P3 / Cosworth FVA 1.6L I4	55	
Ret	2	(Austria) Jochen Rindt	Gold Leaf Team Lotus	Lotus 49T / Cosworth DFW 2.5L V8	43	Engine
Ret	6	(Australia) Frank Gardner	Alec Mildren Racing Pty. Ltd.	Mildren Mono / Alfa Romeo Alfa Romeo 2.5L V8	37	Engine
Ret	22	(Australia) Henk Woelders	Bill Patterson Motors	Elfin 600B / Cosworth FVA 1.6L I4	23	Accident
Ret	15	(Australia) Col Green	Col Green	Repco Brabham BT16 / Coventry Climax FPF 2.5L I4	??	??
Ret	16	(Australia) Alfredo Costanzo	Argo Racing Pty. Ltd.	McLaren M4A / Cosworth FVA 1.6L I4	7	Spun / Stalled
Ret	8	(Australia) Kevin Bartlett	Alec Mildren Racing Pty. Ltd.	Brabham BT23D / Alfa Romeo Alfa Romeo 2.5L V8	5	Head Gasket
Ret	5	(United Kingdom) Piers Courage	Frank Williams Racing	Brabham BT24 / Cosworth DFW 2.5L V8	5	Accident

== Notes ==
- Entries: 15
- Starters: 15
- Finishers: 8
- Pole position: Chris Amon, 52.3
- Winner's race time: 60m 12.8s
- Winner's average speed: 100.18 mph (161.219 k.p.h.)
- Fastest lap: Chris Amon, 52.8

Preceded by 1969 Teretonga International	Tasman Series; 1969	Succeeded by 1969 Warwick Farm International
Preceded by 1968 Australian Grand Prix	Australian Grand Prix; 1969	Succeeded by 1970 Australian Grand Prix
