= Scuderia Veloce =

1960s Australian car racing team

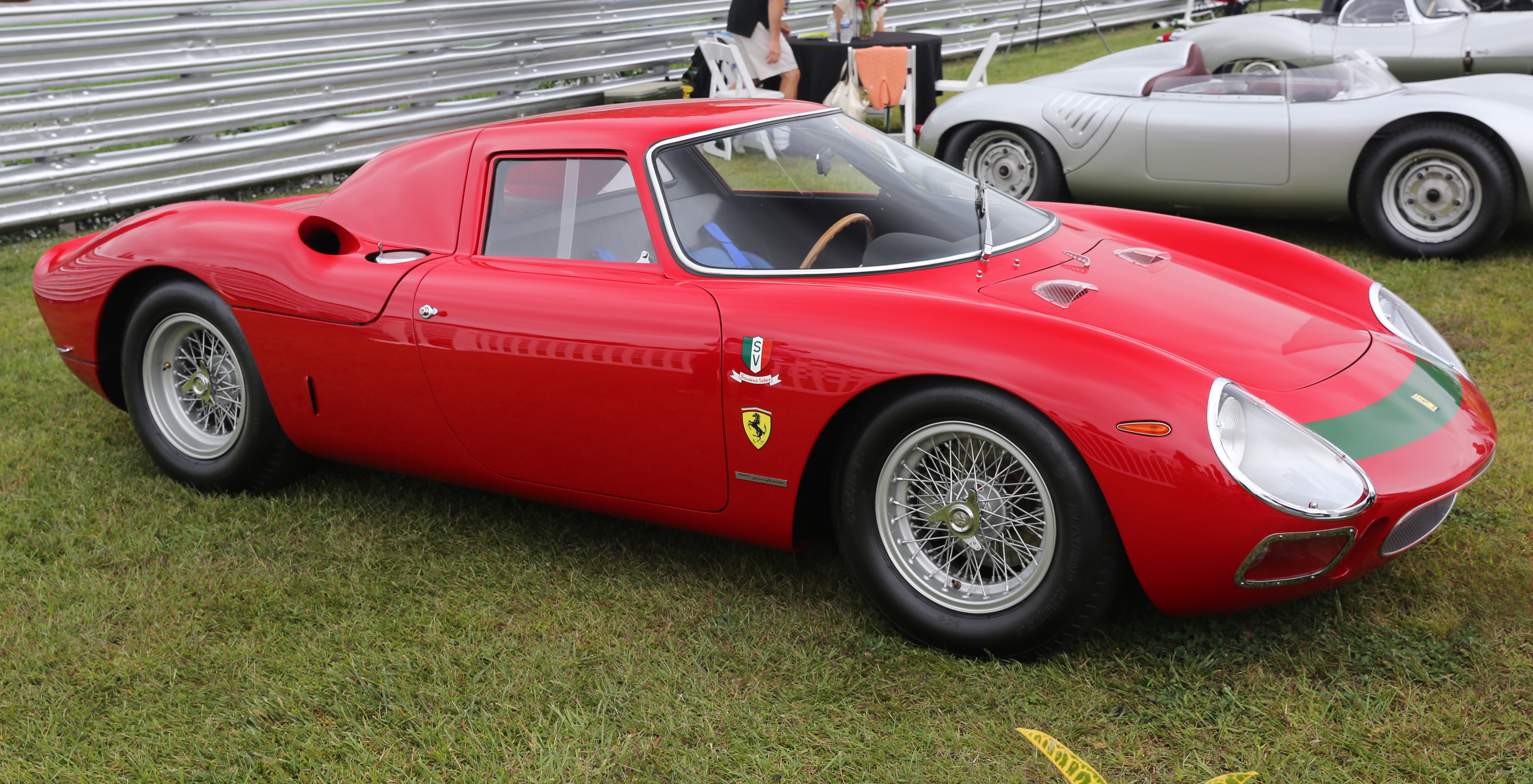
Scuderia Veloce won a number of major Australian Sports Car endurance races with this Ferrari 250 LM seen in 2014

Scuderia Veloce was an Australian motor racing team founded by journalist racer David McKay and his chief mechanic Bob Atkin. The team, which competed in many motor racing categories in the 1960s, is regarded as the first professional motor racing operation in Australia. It was based in Wahroonga on Sydney's upper North Shore. It later became a motor car dealership Specialising in Volvo, Porsche and Ferrari with Bob Atkin as the Managing Director.

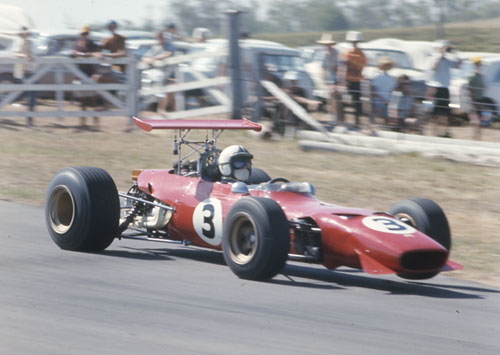
Chris Amon won both the 1969 New Zealand and Australian Grands Prix and the 1969 Tasman Series driving a Dino 246 Tasmania for Scuderia Veloce

McKay gained prominence as a racing driver and as a motoring writer during the 1950s. He won many races including the inaugural Australian Touring Car Championship in 1960 driving a Jaguar Mark 1.

McKay's operation began sporting the Scuderia Veloce name in 1960, following a change of sponsorship from Ampol to Castrol. It ran Cooper-Climax, then Brabham-Climax open racings cars in the Tasman Series, Australian Grand Prix and Australian Drivers' Championship. In 1969 the team was Ferrari's official Tasman Series team and had Chris Amon and Derek Bell in the drivers seats. The venture was a success with Amon winning the 1969 Tasman Series, which included winning the Australian Grand Prix at Lakeside and New Zealand Grand Prix at Pukekohe.

Scuderia Veloce also competed in Appendix J Touring Cars running a variety of cars, as well as competing in Sports Car racing with Ferraris. A Scuderia Veloce entered Ferrari 250 LM won the 1965 Six Hour Le Mans, the 1966 Rothmans 12 Hour International Sports Car Race, the 1967 Rothmans 12 Hour and the 1968 Surfers Paradise 6 Hour.

As well as his own racing efforts, McKay supported several drivers including Brian Muir and Greg Cusack, although the driver most associated with SV would be Spencer Martin.

== Tasman Series results ==
Year	Entrant	Chassis	Driver	1	2	3	4	5	6	7	8	Rank	Points
1964	Scuderia Veloce	Brabham BT4	(United Kingdom) Graham Hill	LEV	PUK	WIG	TER	SAN	WAR; 4	LAK	LON; 1	6th	12
1964	Scuderia Veloce	Brabham BT6	(Australia) Greg Cusack	LEV	PUK	WIG	TER	SAN	WAR; 11	LAK; 7	LON; 10	-	0
1965	Scuderia Veloce	Repco Brabham BT11A	(United Kingdom) Graham Hill	PUK; 1	LEV	WIG	TER	WAR; 5	SAN; Ret	LON; 4		7th	14
1966	Scuderia Veloce	Repco Brabham BT11A	(Australia) Spencer Martin	PUK; Ret	LEV; 3	WIG; 4	TER; Ret	WAR; 5	LAK; Ret	SAN; Ret	LON; 5	7th	11
1969	Scuderia Veloce	Dino 246 Tasmania	(New Zealand) Chris Amon	PUK; 1	LEV; 1	WIG; 3	TER; 3	LAK; 1	WAR; Ret	SAN; 1		1st	44
1969	Scuderia Veloce	Dino 246 Tasmania	(United Kingdom) Derek Bell	PUK; 4	LEV; Ret	WIG; 5	TER; 5	LAK; 2	WAR; 2	SAN; 5		4th	21
