= Dino (marque) =

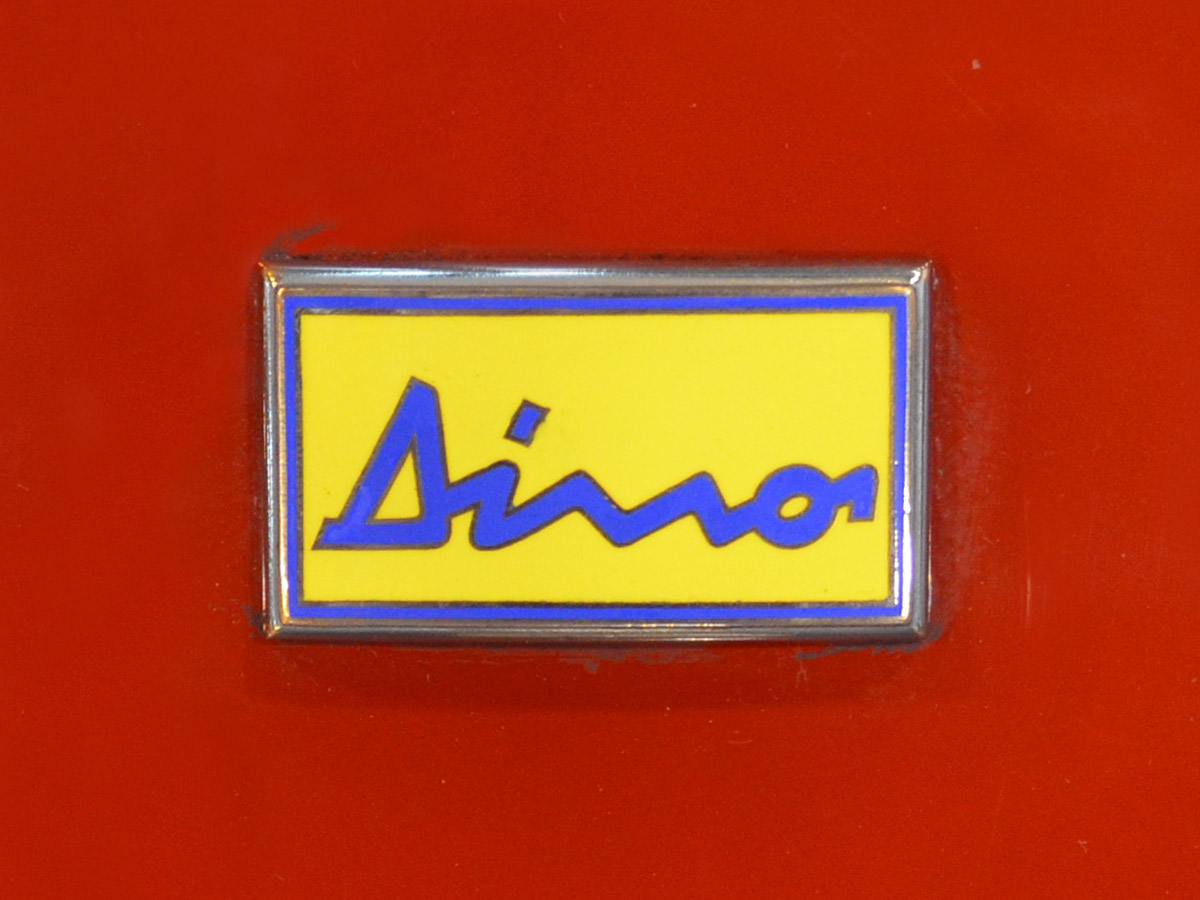
- Current owner: Ferrari
- Country: Italy
- Introduced: 1957
- Discontinued: 1976
- Markets: World

Dino (Italian: [ˈdiːno]), named after Alfredo "Dino" Ferrari (1932-1956) who died a young age but had championed V6 engines at Ferrari, was first used as name for Ferrari race cars with engines smaller than 12 cylinders. The type came into existence in late 1956 with a front-engined Formula Two racer powered by a Dino V6 engine, and also was used in front-engine open sportscar racers. In 1961, Ferrari adopted the mid-engined, rear-drive layout, putting the V6 behind the driver in both the new 1.5 Liter 156 F1 Formula One as well as in the Ferrari SP series of sportscar racers.

In 1965, Ferrari started to develop two kinds of mid-engine V6 Dino sports cars: one was intended mainly for customers racing in the 2.0 Liter Group 4 Sportscar category that required at least 50 to be built, but too few Dino 206S were made, thus they had to enter as Group 6 Prototype. The other was a road going GT car which used Dino as a brand. To have hundreds of Dino V6 engines built in order to achieve homologation in Formula Two of the time, FIAT built the road car engines, and used it also in Fiat cars, and later in the Lancia Stratos.

The name Dino was used for some models with engines smaller than 12 cylinders, it was an attempt by the company to offer a relatively low-cost sports car. The Ferrari name remained reserved for its premium V12 and flat-12 models until 1976, when "Dino" was retired in favour of full Ferrari branding for the new mid engine V8 GT.

== History ==
The name Dino honors Ferrari founder Enzo Ferrari's late son, Alfredo "Dino" Ferrari, credited with designing the V6 engine used in the car. Along with engineer Vittorio Jano, Alfredo persuaded his father to produce a line of racing cars in the 1950s with V6 and V8 engines. The Dino script that adorns the badge and cylinder head covers was based on Alfredo's own signature. The Dino models used Ferrari naming convention of displacement and cylinder count with two digits for the size of the engine in decilitres and the third digit to represent the number of cylinders, i.e. 246 being a 2.4-litre, 6-cylinder and 308 being a 3.0-litre, 8-cylinder.

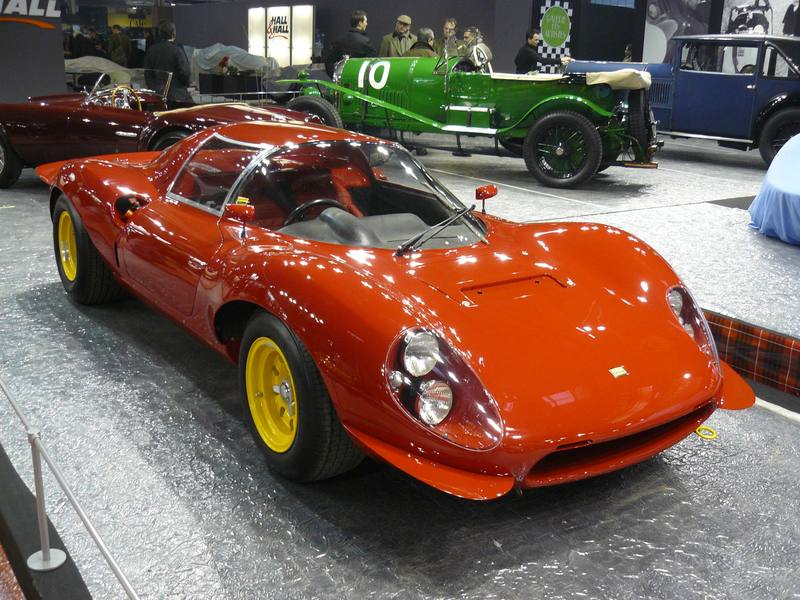
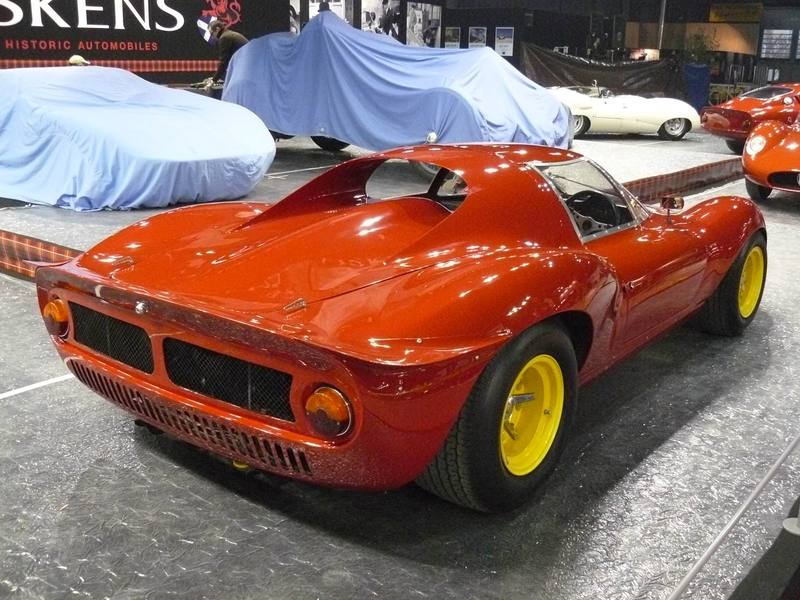
1967 Dino 206 S Berlinetta

== Single seaters ==
=== Dino 156 F2 ===
Dino 156 F2
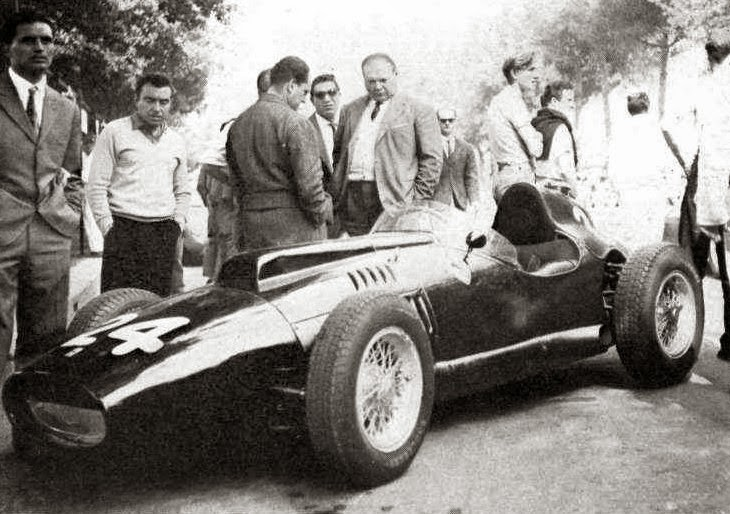
- Debut at Napoli GP on 28 April 1957

Overview
- Also called: Ferrari Dino 156 F2
- Production: 1957; 1 produced

Body and chassis
- Layout: Front mid-engine, rear-wheel-drive
- Related: Ferrari 246 F1

Powertrain
- Engine: 1.5 L (1489.35 cc) Dino 65° V6
- Power output: 180 PS
- Transmission: 4-speed manual

Dimensions
- Wheelbase: 2,160 mm (85.0 in)
- Curb weight: 512 kg (1,129 lb)

The first race car to ever bear the Dino marque badge was the 1957 Dino 156 F2 single seater intended for the Formula 2 series. It was powered by an all-new, front-mounted, 65° Dino V6 co-designed by Vittorio Jano and named in memory of Enzo Ferrari's late son, Alfredo "Dino" Ferrari. The new V6 engine, first built and tested in 1956, had to adhere to 1.5 litre, Formula 2 regulations.

Total capacity was 1,489.35 cc (90.9 cu in; 1.5 L) (bore of 70 mm and stroke of 64.5 mm) and power output was 180 PS (132 kW; 178 hp) at 9000 rpm with a 10:1 compression ratio. The fuel system consisted of three Weber 38DCN carburettors and used regular fuel. The valvetrain was of a twin overhead camshafts per bank type with two valves per cylinder and single spark plugs.

As per the naming convention, the 1.5-litre, 6-cylinder car was named 156 and made its debut at the Naples Grand Prix in 1957. The chassis was made of steel tubes with independent front suspension, a de Dion rear axle, and Houdaille shock absorbers. Only one example was produced: s/n 0011. Its drivers included Luigi Musso, Maurice Trintignant, and Peter Collins.

Musso managed to score third place at the time of its debut at the Naples GP and Maurice Trintignant won the Coupe de Vitesse. Musso later took two second-place finishes at the Modena GP (in both heats).

The engine was upgraded to 1860 cc in 1957 (later 2195 cc), to 2,417.33 cc (2.4 L; 147.5 cu in) 85 x 71 mm 280 PS (206 kW; 276 hp) at 8500 rpm in 1958 for Formula One specification {and renamed Ferrari 246 F1 ) and 2,474 cc (2.5 L; 151.0 cu in) 290 PS (213 kW; 286 hp) in 1959. In 1960 the engine was updated with a lower V-degree (65º>60º), a shorter stroke {73 x 58.8 mm for 1476.6 cc), and a single overhead camshaft.

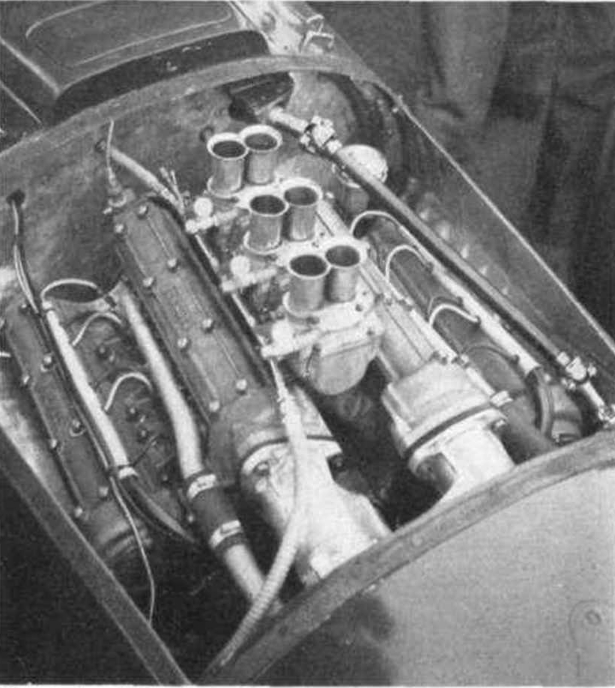
65° V6 in Dino 156 F2

=== Dino 166 F2 ===
Dino 166 F2
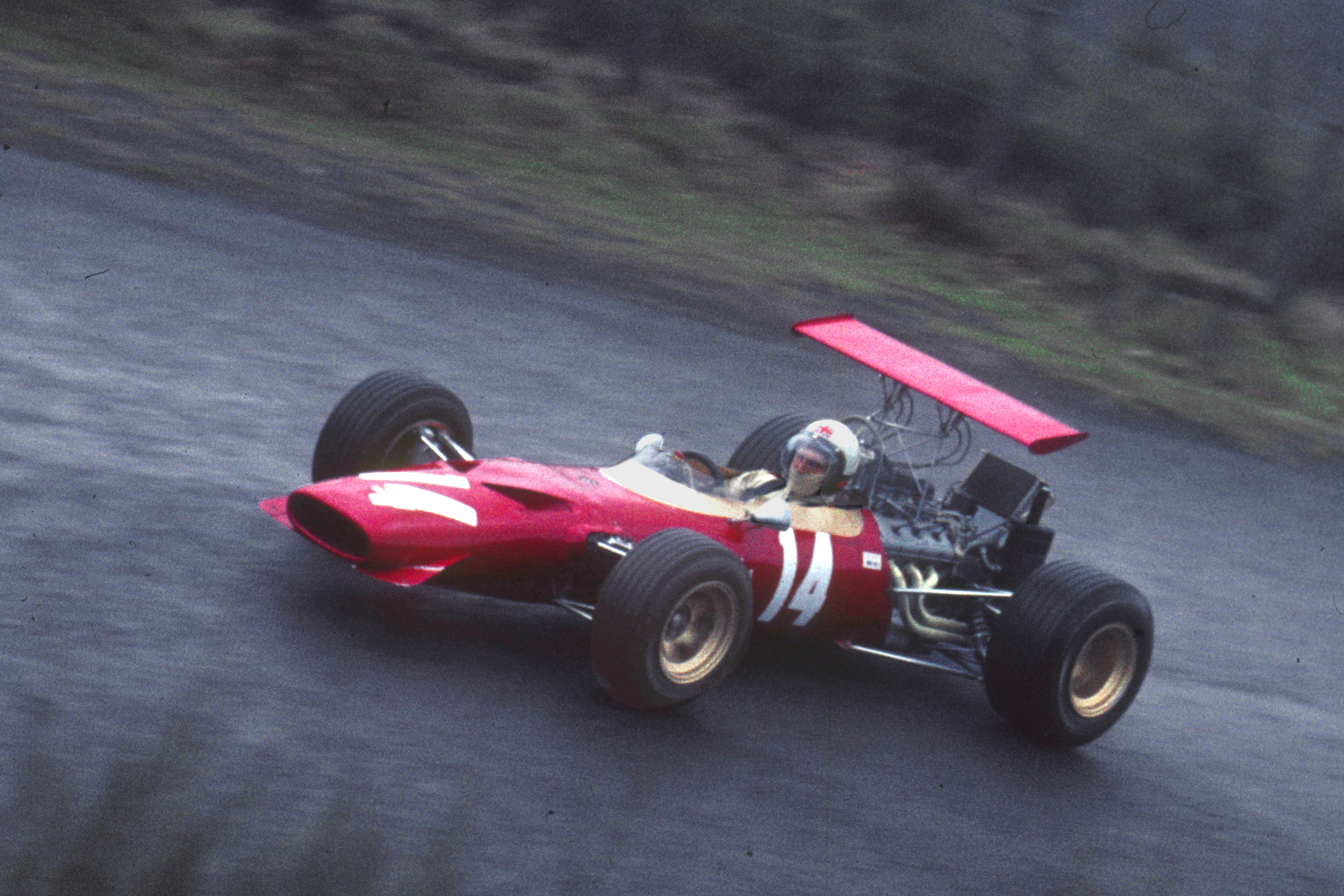
- Derek Bell's Dino 166 F2 on Nürburgring

Overview
- Also called: Ferrari Dino 166 F2
- Production: 1967; 7 produced

Body and chassis
- Layout: Rear mid-engine, rear-wheel-drive

Powertrain
- Engine: 1.6 L (1596.25 cc) Dino 65° V6
- Power output: 220 PS
- Transmission: 5-speed manual

Dimensions
- Wheelbase: 2,220 mm (87.4 in)
- Curb weight: 425–430 kg (937–948 lb)

A change in Formula One rules for the 1966 season brought changes to Formula 2 as well. New homologation requirements meant that at least 500 production units of the same engine block were to be produced. Ferrari turned to Fiat to produce a more affordable sports car for this purpose. Fiat produced two models with the Dino engine in coupé and spider form under the name Fiat Dino. For the 1967 European Championship season Ferrari was able to field a new car, the Dino 166 F2, with a rear-mounted, longitudinal 65° Dino V6 engine. The car made its debut at the Racing Car Show in Turin in February 1967.

==== Specifications ====
The new powerplant had 1,596.25 cc (97.4 cu in; 1.6 L) of total capacity with a bore of 86 mm and a very short stroke at only 45.8 mm with a Heron type 3 valve head. A single split overhead camshaft per bank actuated three valves per cylinder: two inlet directly by the camshaft and one exhaust through a rocker. In 1968, the cylinder measures changed to 79.5 x 53.5 mm (1,593.4 cc (97.2 cu in; 1.6 L)) with an 11:1 compression ratio. In 1969, the power grew from 200 PS (147 kW; 197 hp) at 10,000 rpm to 232 PS (171 kW; 229 hp) at 11,000 rpm. Fuel feed was by Lucas indirect injection and ignition by Magneti Marelli transistorized twin-plugs, later changed to a single ignition. The chassis was a semi-monocoque with all-independent suspension and disc brakes. Seven cars were built, of which three were later converted for the Tasman race series with engines enlarged to 2.4 litres.

==== Racing ====
The cars were raced by Ernesto Brambilla, Chris Amon, Andrea de Adamich, and Derek Bell. Their first F2 wins were the 1968 Hockenheim race and later the GP Roma at Vallelunga.

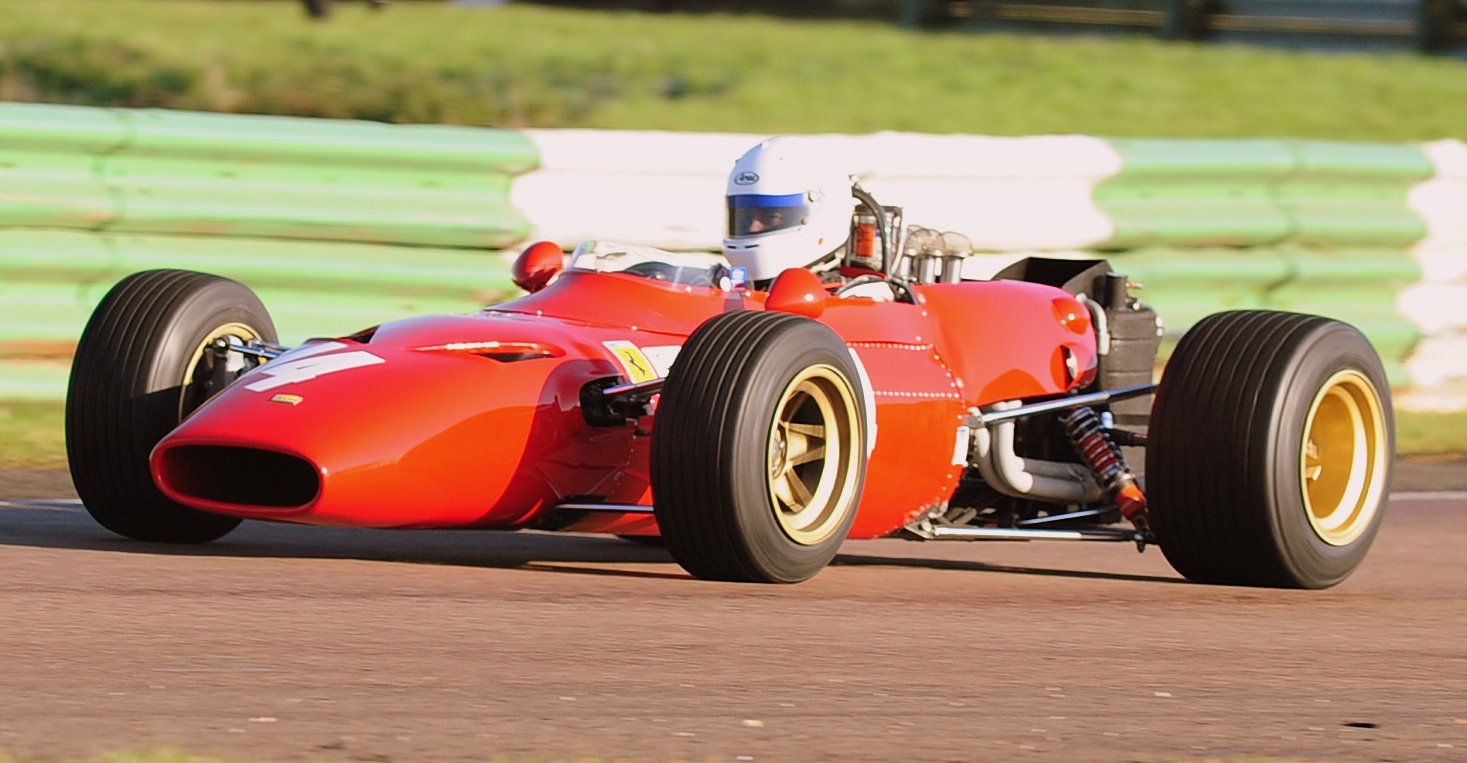
Dino 166 F2

=== Dino 246T ===
Dino 246T Ferrari Dino 246T
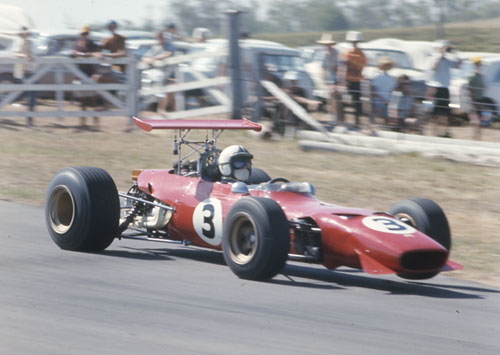
- Category: Tasman Series
- Constructor: Ferrari
- Designer: Mauro Forghieri

Technical specifications
- Chassis: semi-monocoque
- Suspension (front): Double wishbones, coil springs
- Suspension (rear): Double wishbones, coil springs
- Axle track: F: 1,405 mm (55.3 in); R: 1,400 mm (55 in)
- Wheelbase: 2,220 mm (87.4 in)
- Engine: Dino, 2.4 L (2,405 cc), V6, NA, mid-engine, longitudinally mounted
- Transmission: 5-speed manual
- Power: 285 bhp (213 kW; 289 PS) at 8,900 rpm
- Weight: 440 kg (970 lb)
- Fuel: Shell
- Tyres: Avon

Competition history
- Notable entrants: 1968: C. Amon; 1969: Scuderia Veloce; 1970: Lawrence Racing; 1971: Air New Zealand
- Notable drivers: (New Zealand) Chris Amon (United Kingdom) Derek Bell (New Zealand) Graeme Lawrence
- Debut: 1968 New Zealand Grand Prix
- Last event: 1971 Rothmans 100
Races	Wins	Poles	F/Laps
36	7	N/A	N/A
- Constructors' Championships: N/A
- Drivers' Championships: 1 (1969)

For the 1968 season of Formula One, Ferrari had returned to the V12 engined cars. This created a need to pursue other racing venues for their already existing projects. The Tasman Series for cars up to 2500 cc was just that venue and the Dino 246T (sometimes referred to as the Ferrari Dino 246T) was just such a car, converted from the Dino 166 Formula 2 basis with the engine enlarged to 2.4 L to meet the requirements without overstretching the engine.

By 1969, the car had been given a rear wing and two smaller wings protruding from the front of the bodywork (as seen in the picture of Chris Amon on his way to winning the 1969 Australian Grand Prix). After having already won the series, At the 7th and final round at Sandown in Melbourne, Amon told reporter Max Stahl that while the wings did help the cars, he would rather that they were done away with altogether.

==== Specifications ====
The new displacement of 2,404.74 cc (146.7 cu in; 2.4 L) was achieved thanks to 90 by 63 mm (3.5 by 2.5 in) of bore and stroke. Internal dimensions were identical to that of the 246 F1-66. At an 11.5:1 compression ratio, power output was a healthy 285 bhp (213 kW; 289 PS) at 8,900 rpm. Already standard on 65° Dino V6 twin overhead camshafts per bank, and a novelty: four valves per cylinder. The same as its predecessor, the chassis was a semi-monocoque with all-independent suspension and disc brakes.

In Tasman Series racing, other engines that the Dino V6 was generally up against were the 290 bhp (216 kW; 294 PS) Australian made Repco V8, the Tasman variant of the Cosworth DFV, the ~360 bhp (268 kW; 365 PS) Cosworth DFW, a sprint variant of the 315 bhp (235 kW; 319 PS) Alfa Romeo Tipo 33 V8 used in the Alfa Romeo T33/2 Daytona 2.5 Litre endurance racing sports car, the 260 bhp (194 kW; 264 PS), 2.1L version of the V8 BRM, the older Coventry Climax FPF and FMWV engines and the 200 bhp (149 kW; 203 PS), 1.6L Cosworth FVA.

==== Racing ====
Only three cars were made and raced with success between 1968 and 1971, mainly in hands of Chris Amon and Graeme Lawrence. The Tasman Series was particularly suited for the Dino 246T. Chris Amon won two races in the 1968 Tasman Series, including its debut race, the 1968 New Zealand Grand Prix where he also started from pole position. After finishing 2nd to Lotus mounted Jim Clark in 1968, Amon went on to dominate the 1969 Tasman Series by scoring four wins, including wins both blue ribbon events, the 1969 New Zealand Grand Prix at Pukekohe and the 1969 Australian Grand Prix at Lakeside, on his way to winning the Drivers Championship. In 1969 Amon was aided by Derek Bell in the other Scuderia Veloce car with enough points for fourth place. For the 1970 Tasman Series the winning car was handed over to Graeme Lawrence who won only one race but, with four other podium finishes, won the championship.

==== Race Wins ====
New Zealand Grand Prix

- 1968 (Chris Amon), 1969 (Chris Amon)

Levin International

- 1968 (Chris Amon), 1969 (Chris Amon), 1970 (Graeme Lawrence)

Australian Grand Prix

- 1969 (Chris Amon)

Sandown International 100

- 1969 (Chris Amon)

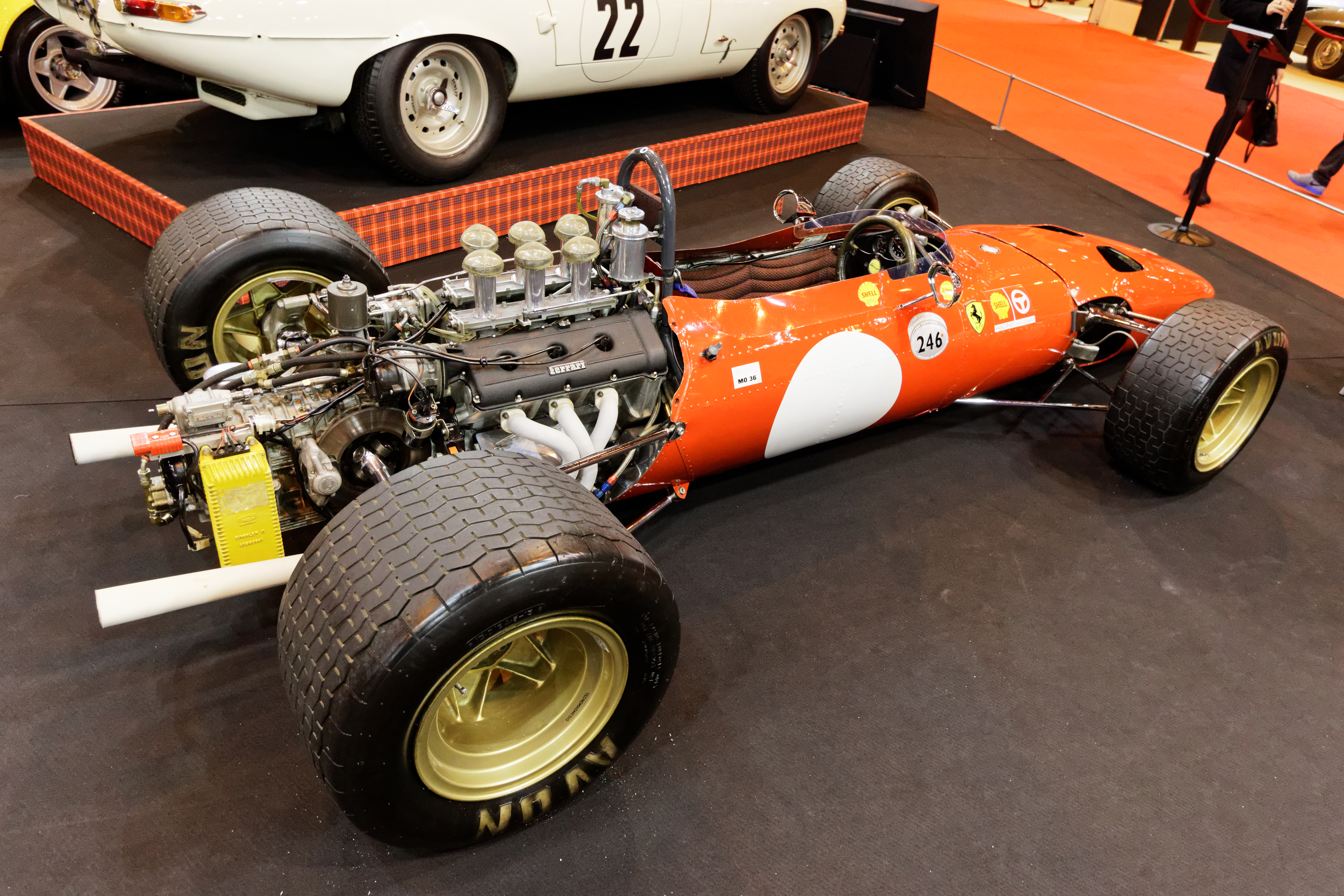
1968 Dino 246T with engine bay exposed

== Sports racing cars ==
=== Dino 196 S ===
Dino 196 S
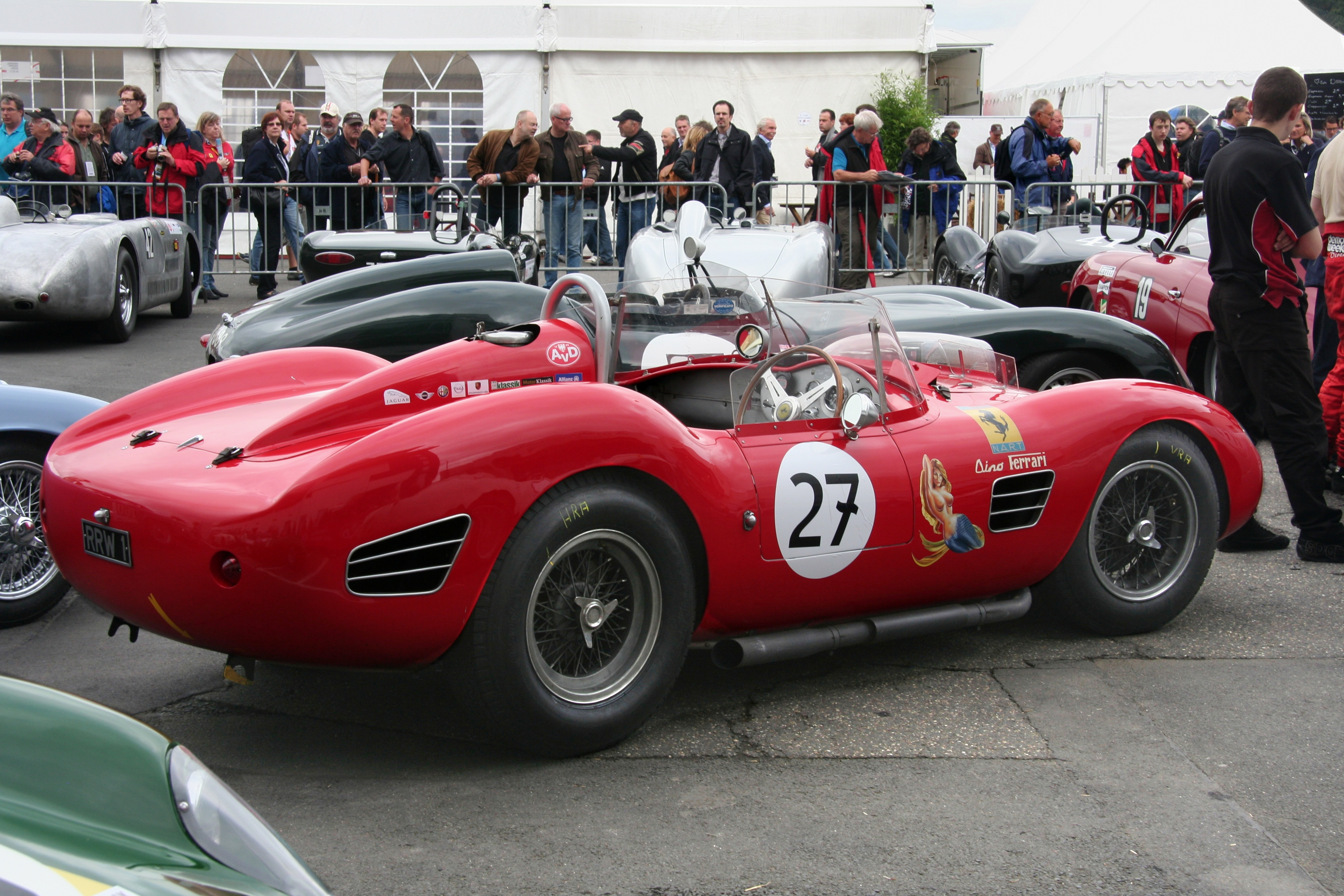
- Dino 196 S with Fantuzzi bodywork, rear view

Overview
- Also called: Ferrari Dino 196 S
- Production: 1958–1959; 2 produced
- Designer: Carrozzeria Fantuzzi

Body and chassis
- Layout: Front mid-engine, rear-wheel-drive

Powertrain
- Engine: 2.0 L (1983.72 cc) Dino 65° V6; 2.0 L (1983.72 cc) Dino 60° V6
- Power output: 195 PS
- Transmission: 4-speed manual

Dimensions
- Wheelbase: 2,220 mm (87.4 in)

The first sports racing car under Dino marque was 2.0 L Dino V6-engined Dino 196 S. The first example, s/n 0740, was made in 1958 and had a 65° DOHC configuration as found in its Formula Two predecessor and is sometimes referred to as 206 S. The other, s/n 0776 from 1959, had its engine redesigned as a 60° SOHC version. A possible third car was immediately upgraded to 3.0 L specification and never raced it its two-litre form. All early Dino sports cars actually had Ferrari badges on the front.

==== Specifications ====
Both cars' engines had 1,983.72 cc (121.1 cu in; 2.0 L) of total capacity from 77 by 71 mm (3.0 by 2.8 in) of bore and stroke. Both used the same carburettor setup with three 42DCN Webers, resulting in the same 195 PS (143 kW; 192 hp) power output. The differing factors were the RPM range: 7200 for the DOHC, 7800 for both the SOHC engine and a twin spark plug arrangement for the DOHC-variant. Both cars were created on a tubular chassis with independent front suspension and live rear axle. The first car received Scaglietti coachwork, but was soon rebodied by Fantuzzi, who also bodied the second car. Their style was reminiscent of a Ferrari 250 TR and was often referred to as a 'smaller Testa Rossa.'

==== Racing ====
The first Dino 196 S made its debut at the Goodwood Sussex Trophy and was driven to second place by Peter Collins. After being converted to SOHC form, it scored silver for the 1959 Le Mans Test and a single victory at Coppa Sant Ambroeus. The last race for this car was the 1959 Pontedecimo-Giovi hillclimb in which another second place was achieved before the car was dismantled at the factory. The other Dino had a much longer career. In 1959, driven by Ricardo Rodriguez it finished fourth and second in a couple of races at the Governor's Trophy, Nassau. The following year the car was entered in the Targa Florio and finished seventh overall.

==== Replicas ====
Numerous replicas had been made of this model. Approximately twelve examples based on a tubular chassis with handcrafted aluminium bodywork in Fantuzzi spider style. Cars were created either by anonymous builders or by Vincenzo Marciano, an Italian private constructor. Power came from 2.4 L four-cam V6 Fiat Dino road car engine mated to a 5-speed ZF transmission.

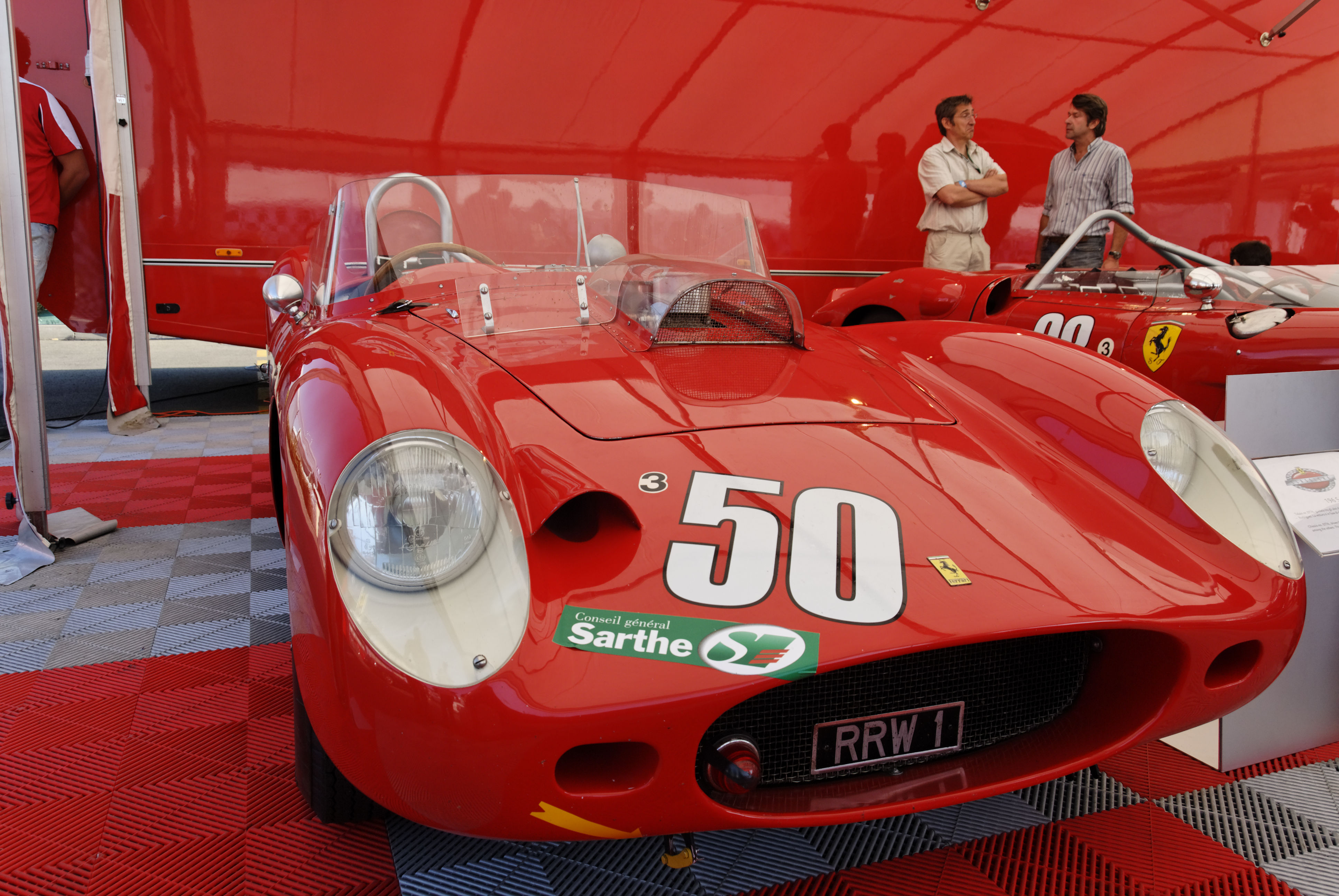
1959 Dino 196 S, front view

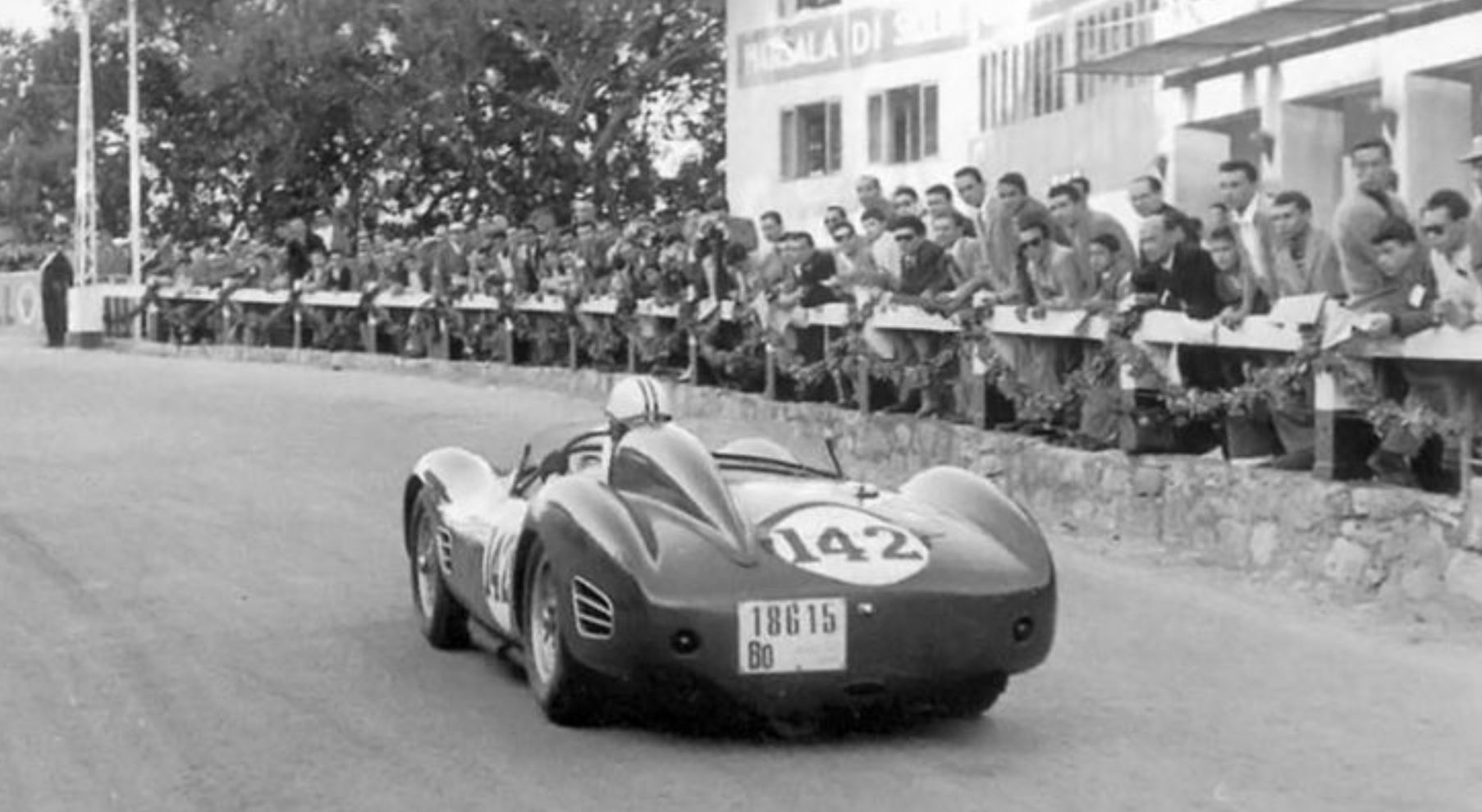
Chassis 0740 during 1959 Targa Florio

=== Dino 296 S ===
Dino 296 S

Overview
- Also called: Ferrari Dino 296 S
- Production: 1958; 1 produced

Powertrain
- Engine: 3.0 L (2962.08 cc) Dino 65° V6
- Power output: 300 PS

Dimensions
- Wheelbase: 2,280 mm (89.8 in)

The second Dino-badged sports racing model was the 1958 Dino 296 S. Only a single example, s/n 0746, was made with a near 3-litre V6 engine. It had a 65° configuration with twin overhead camshafts per bank and two spark plugs per cylinder. Total capacity was 2,962.08 cc (180.8 cu in; 3.0 L) thanks to internal measurements of 85 x 87 mm. With three Weber 45DCN carburettors, power was an impressive 300 PS (221 kW; 296 hp) at 7600 rpm.

A tubular steel chassis with independent front suspension, de Dion rear axle and drum brakes was clothed with a spider Fantuzzi bodywork as seen on its siblings from the same period. The fuel tank had 177 litres capacity.

Its first outing was in England at Silverstone Circuit in May 1958, where Mike Hawthorn scored third place. After just a single race the car was converted into an experimental 250 Testa Rossa model and raced in June, the same year, at the 1000km Nürburgring, where Wolfgang von Trips and Olivier Gendebien finished third overall. The model was further raced by Ricardo Rodriguez in the Bahamas and United States.

=== Dino 246 S ===
Dino 246 S
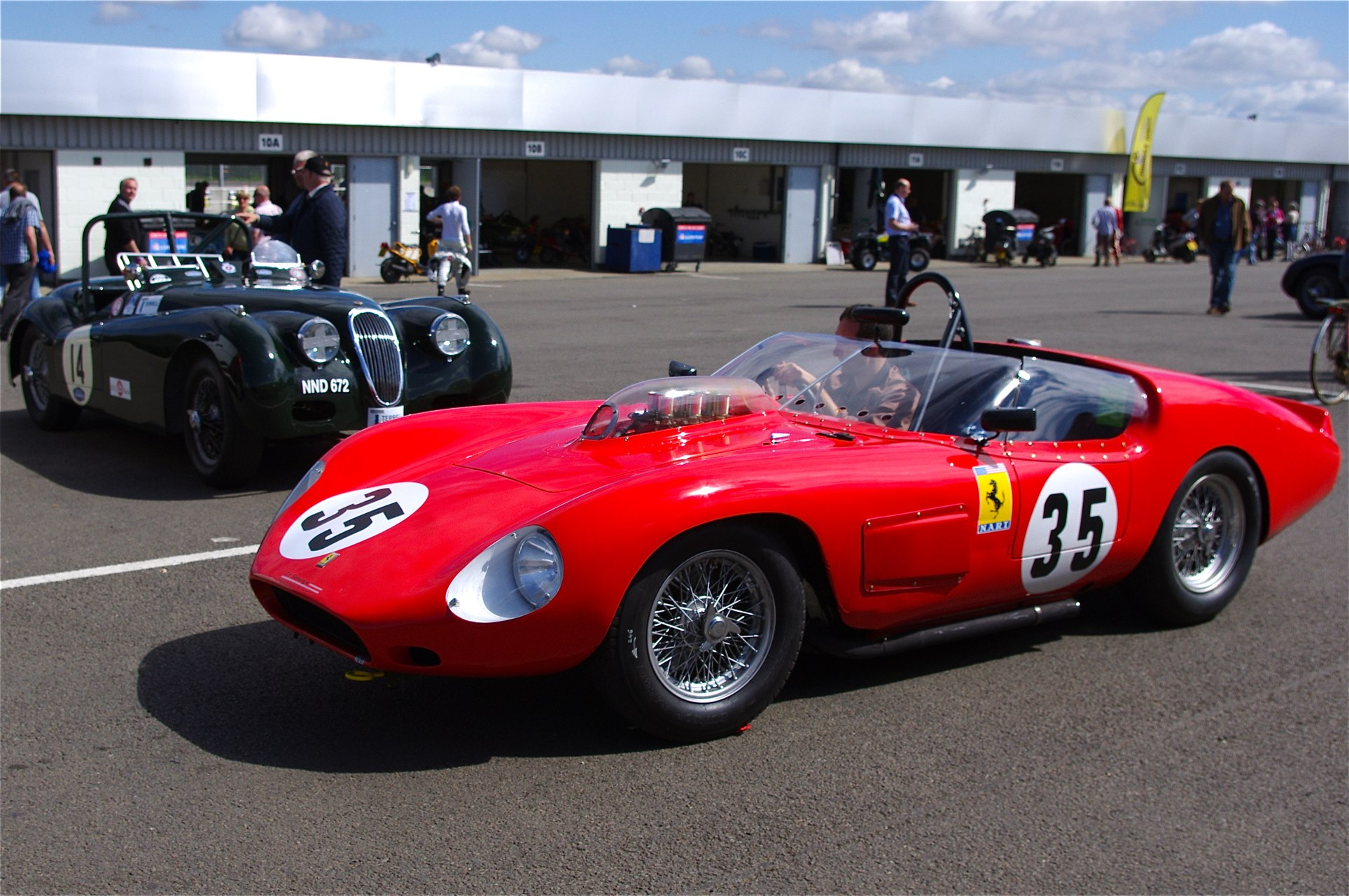
- 1959 Dino 246 S 'high tail' Fantuzzi Spider

Overview
- Also called: Ferrari Dino 246 S
- Production: 1959–1960; 2 produced

Powertrain
- Engine: 2.4 L (2417.33 cc) Dino 60° V6
- Power output: 250 PS
- Transmission: 5-speed manual

Dimensions
- Wheelbase: 2,160 mm (85.0 in)
- Curb weight: 640 kg (1,411 lb) (dry)

Chronology
- Successor: Ferrari SP

For the 1960 season, Ferrari presented a new derivative of their V6-engined sports racing car, the Dino 246 S. Its engine was closely related to that found in the Ferrari 246 F1 but designed as a 60°, chain-driven, single overhead camshaft per bank variant. Only two examples were ever created, s/n 0778 and 0784, the latter known as the 'high tail' spider.

==== Specifications ====
Internal measurements of 85 x 71 mm and resulting capacity of 2.4 L (2,417.33 cc (147.5 cu in)) were identical to the Formula One sibling. At a 9.8:1 compression ratio with three Weber 42DCN carburettors, rated power output was 250 PS (184 kW; 247 hp) at 7500 rpm. The engine used a single spark plug per cylinder served by a single coil. This would be the last Dino sports racing car with a front-mounted engine.

The chassis was constructed out of steel tubes with independent front suspension and a live axle at the rear. The wheelbase was 2,160 mm (85.0 in). Bodies were designed and executed by Fantuzzi, both in the style previously seen on the Dino cars, but s/n 0784 was rebodied as a 'high tail' spider before 1961 12 Hours of Sebring race. Brakes were of a disc type all-round.

==== Racing ====
The Dino 246 S debuted in January 1960 at the 1000km Buenos Aires but failed to finish due to ignition problems. Its first success came when both cars were entered in the 1960 Targa Florio, finishing second and fourth overall and first and second in the 'Sports 3.0' class. Phil Hill and Wolfgang von Trips drove the car that finished second. Ludovico Scarfiotti, Willy Mairesse and Giulio Cabianca were in the other car. In 1960, s/n 0778 was recreated at the factory after a pit stop fire damage at the 1000km Nürburgring. Both cars continued their later careers in the United States. The 'high tail' spider driven by Jim Hall and George Constantine scored sixth place and won its 'Sports 2.5' class at the 1961 12 Hours of Sebring.

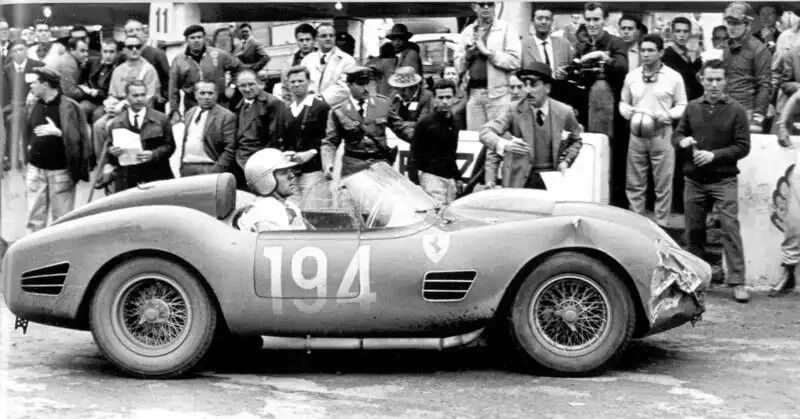
1959 Dino 246 S, s/n 0784, first outing at 1960 Targa Florio to a second place overall with Phil Hill and Wolfgang von Trips. Its original bodywork was changed a year later.

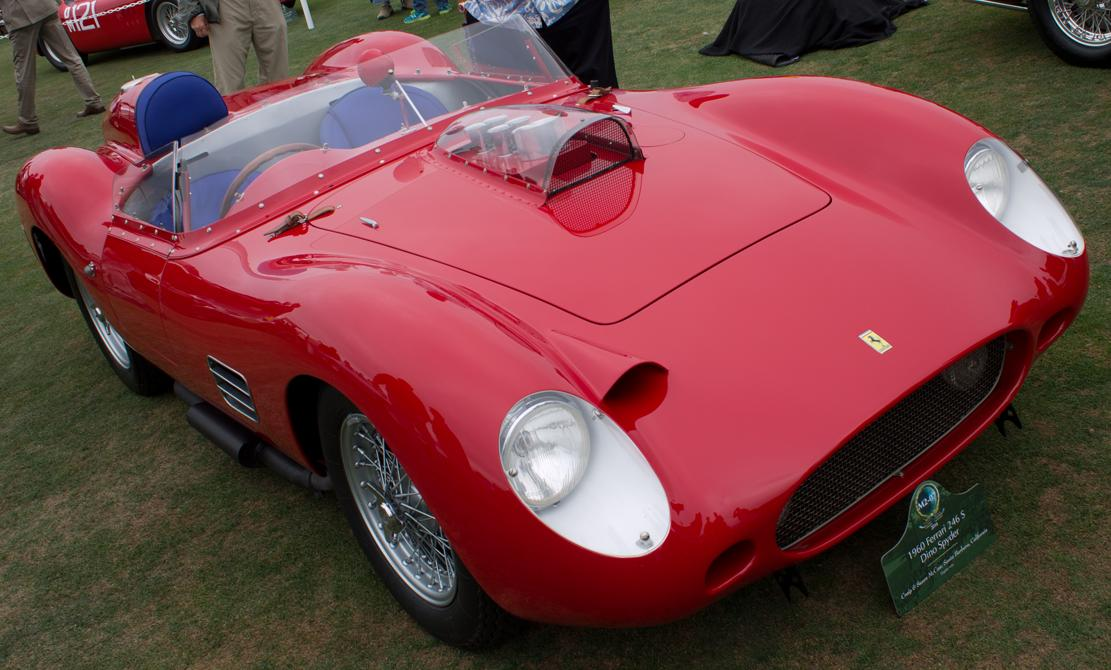
1960 Dino 246 S

== Sports prototypes ==
=== Ferrari SP series ===
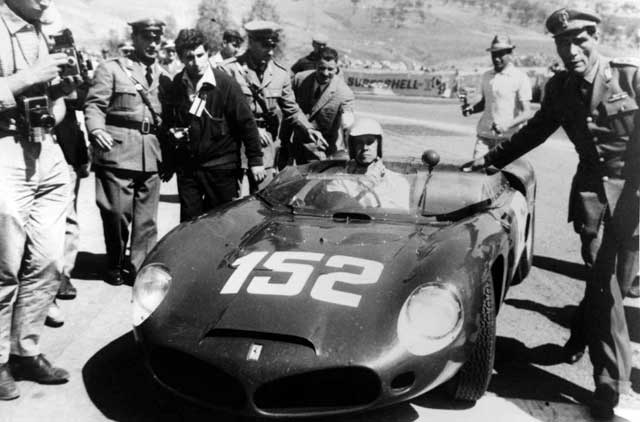
1961 Ferrari Dino 246 SP

The Ferrari Dino SP was a series of Italian sports prototype racing cars produced by Ferrari from 1961 through 1962. This first series of Dino-engined sports prototypes included the 246 SP, 196 SP, 286 SP, 248 SP, and 268 SP; distinguished from each other by use of V6 and V8 engines in different displacements. All shared a similar body and chassis with a rear mid-engine layout, a first for a Ferrari sports car. Major racing accolades include the 1962 European Hill Climb Championship, two overall Targa Florio victories, in 1961 and 1962, and "1962 Coupe des Sports" title.

At first the SP-series used Vittorio Jano-designed, V6 Dino engines in both SOHC 60° and DOHC 65° forms. Later, Ferrari introduced a new SOHC 90° V8 engine designed by Carlo Chiti. All used dry sump lubrication and were mated to a 5-speed manual transmission.

After 1963, these Ferrari SP models were no longer used by Scuderia Ferrari and passed into the ownership of private individuals or independent racing teams. They were succeeded by the Dino 166 P in 1965.

=== Dino 166 P ===
Dino 166 P
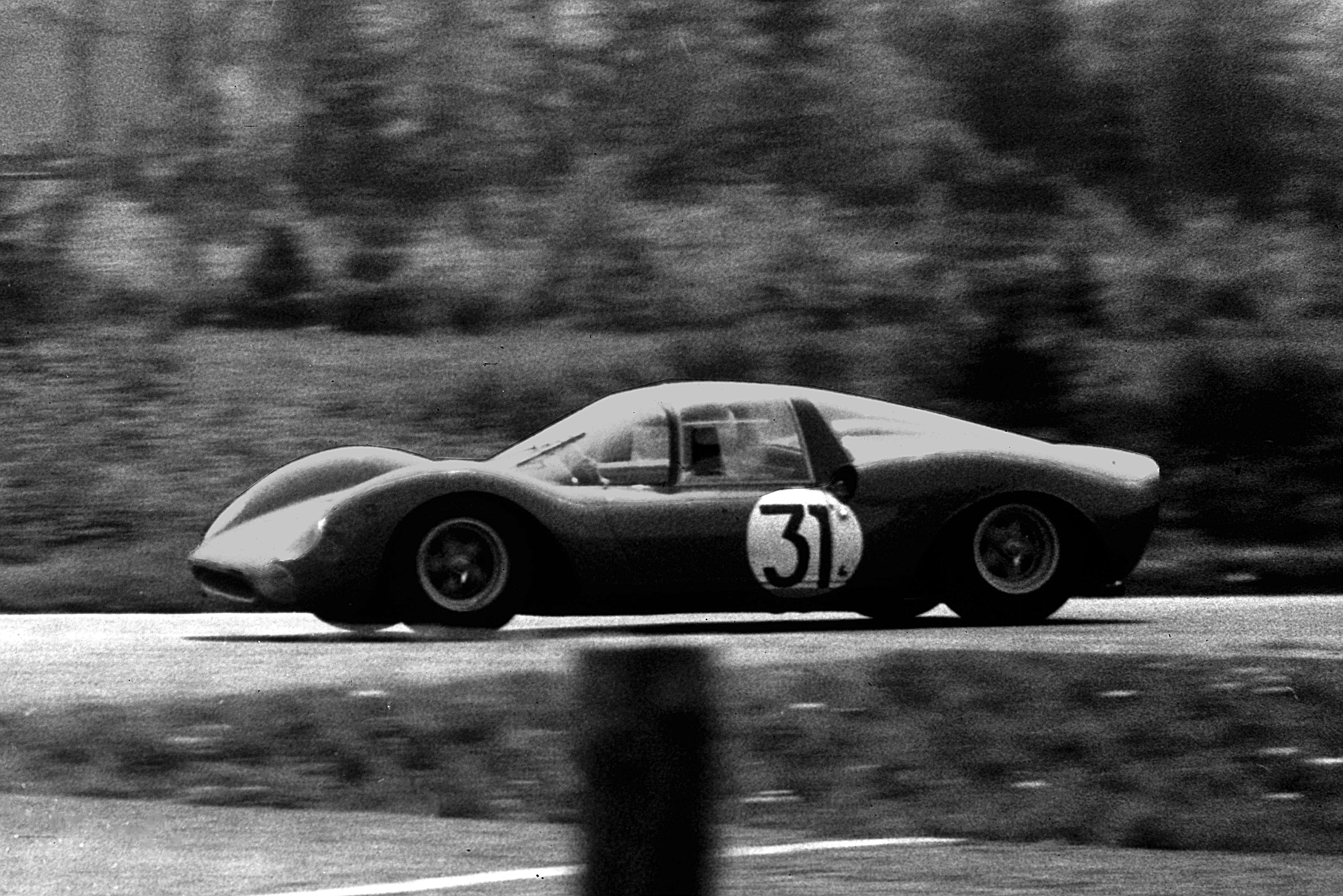
- Lorenzo Bandini's Dino 166 P in the 1965 1000km Nürburgring

Overview
- Also called: Ferrari Dino 166 P
- Production: 1965; 2 produced
- Designer: Carrozzeria Sports Cars

Body and chassis
- Layout: Rear mid-engine, rear-wheel-drive

Powertrain
- Engine: 1.6 L (1592.57 cc) Dino 65° V6
- Power output: 175 PS
- Transmission: 5-speed manual

Dimensions
- Wheelbase: 2,280 mm (89.8 in)
- Curb weight: 586 kg (1,292 lb) (dry)

Chronology
- Predecessor: Ferrari SP

The 1965 Dino 166 P was created by Ferrari to compete in endurance racing with categories up to 1600 cc or even 2000 cc. One chassis that raced, s/n 0834, sported brand new all-aluminium berlinetta bodywork inspired by the Ferrari P-series of cars but with smaller dimensions. It was designed and built by Piero Drogo's Carrozzeria Sports Cars in Modena. This new style would be carried over to the rest of the Dino race car family. This was the first Ferrari-made sports prototype to bear the rectangular 'Dino' badge on the front of the car and also the first to be bodied with a closed body. A second car, s/n 0842, never raced and was converted into the works prototype of the Dino 206 S.

==== Specifications ====
The engine, mounted in the rear, displaced 1.6 L (1,592.57 cc (97.2 cu in)) from 77 by 57 mm (3.0 by 2.2 in) of bore and stroke. The compression ratio was 11.5:1 and with three Weber 40DCN/2 carburettors and twin spark plugs per cylinder, resulting power was 175 PS (129 kW; 173 hp) at 9000 rpm. From this moment on, every Dino race and road car would have a 65°, twin overhead camshafts per bank with two valves per cylinder engine. As a race engine it also used dry sump lubrication.

A tubular steel chassis now received full independent suspension, front and rear. The wheelbase was 2,280 mm (89.8 in) long. Disc brakes all-round were standard at the time. The whole car weighed only 586 kg (1,292 lb) dry.

==== Racing ====
After a failed attempt at the 1000km Monza in May 1965, the following month the 166 P was entered into the GP Roma on the Vallelunga track. Giancarlo Baghetti won it outright, two laps ahead of a Porsche. The same month Lorenzo Bandini with Nino Vaccarella scored a respectable fourth place overall and second in 'Prototype 2.0' class at the 1000km Nürburgring, ahead of cars with much bigger engine capacity. Just after failing to finish the 1965 24 Hours of Le Mans race due to engine problems, the 166 P was developed into the Dino 206 SP with completely open bodywork and a bigger 2.0 L engine.

=== Dino 206 SP ===
Dino 206 SP
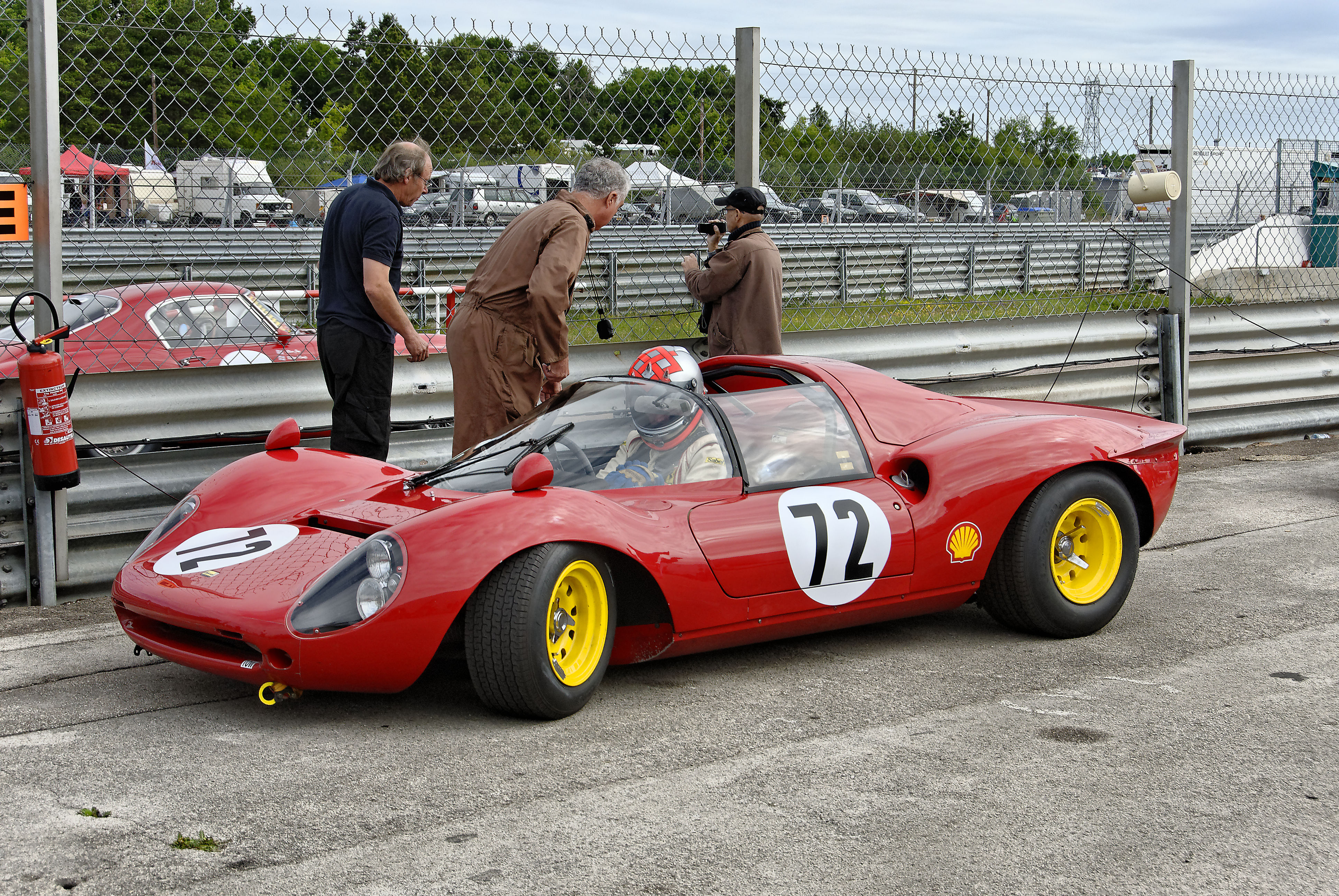

Overview
- Also called: Ferrari Dino 206 SP; Dino 206 P
- Production: 1965; 2 made (one was converted from 166 P)

Powertrain
- Engine: 2.0 L (1986.60 cc) Dino 65° V6
- Power output: 218 PS

Dimensions
- Curb weight: 532 kg (1,173 lb) (dry)

The Dino sports prototype model that followed the 166 P was the Dino 206 SP. The first example was an exact conversion from is predecessor, still with the same s/n 0834, but with new barchetta body and a bigger 2.0 L engine. Designed specifically for the European hillclimb events, the car is also referred to simply as the Dino 206 P. A second car, s/n 0840, was the basis for the concept car, Dino Berlinetta Speciale by Pininfarina.

==== Specifications ====
The biggest change was the engine enlargement to 2.0 L (1,986.60 cc (121.2 cu in)) so that car could make full use of the 2000 cc category limit. The engine was redesigned by Ferrari engineer Franco Rocchi for Formula Two use. This displacement would be carried over not only to the 206 S, the succeeding model, but also to the Fiat and Dino road cars as well. The larger displacement was due to bigger bore, now at 86 mm (3.4 in), and stroke was the same as before. Power rose to 218 PS (160 kW; 215 hp) at 9000 rpm, with all of the remaining specifications the same apart for all-new Lucas fuel injection.

All of the chassis and suspension configuration was carried over without change. The 206 SP received new low-slung barchetta bodywork that was a whole 160 mm (6.3 in) lower, now at 800 mm (31.5 in). Only a small, wrap-around windscreen and a single roll bar protruded above the bodywork. Due to this mass reduction the overall dry weight of the car measured up to 532 kg (1,173 lb), that is more than a 50 kg (110 lb) saving. All this was with twisty hillclimb competition in mind. Later the car was rebodied in style with the 206 S and received similar roll bar-roof treatment.

==== Racing ====
The new car debuted at its first hillclimb in Trento-Bondone in 1965, winning it outright in the hands of Ludovico Scarfiotti, despite being described as "an absurdly dramatic climb". He also won three more races in a row: the Cesana-Sestriere hillclimb, the Freiburg-Schauinsland hillclimb and Ollon-Villars. At the Gaisberg hillclimb in August 1965 Scarfiotti finished fifth but still won the European Hill Climb Championship. This was his second championship for Ferrari, the first he won back in 1962 in a Ferrari 196 SP. In 1967 the 206 SP was lent to Scuderia Nettuno that entered the car in the Targa Florio, placing fourth overall and third in the 'Prototype 2.0' class, driven by Vittorio Venturi and Jonathan Williams. Venturi then placed third in yet another hillclimb event at Monte Erice. Leandro "Cinno" Terra entered the 206 SP for the 1969 Targa Florio, but finished in a distant 25th place. Its last period race was the Coppa Collina, where it finished in second place.

=== Dino 206 S ===
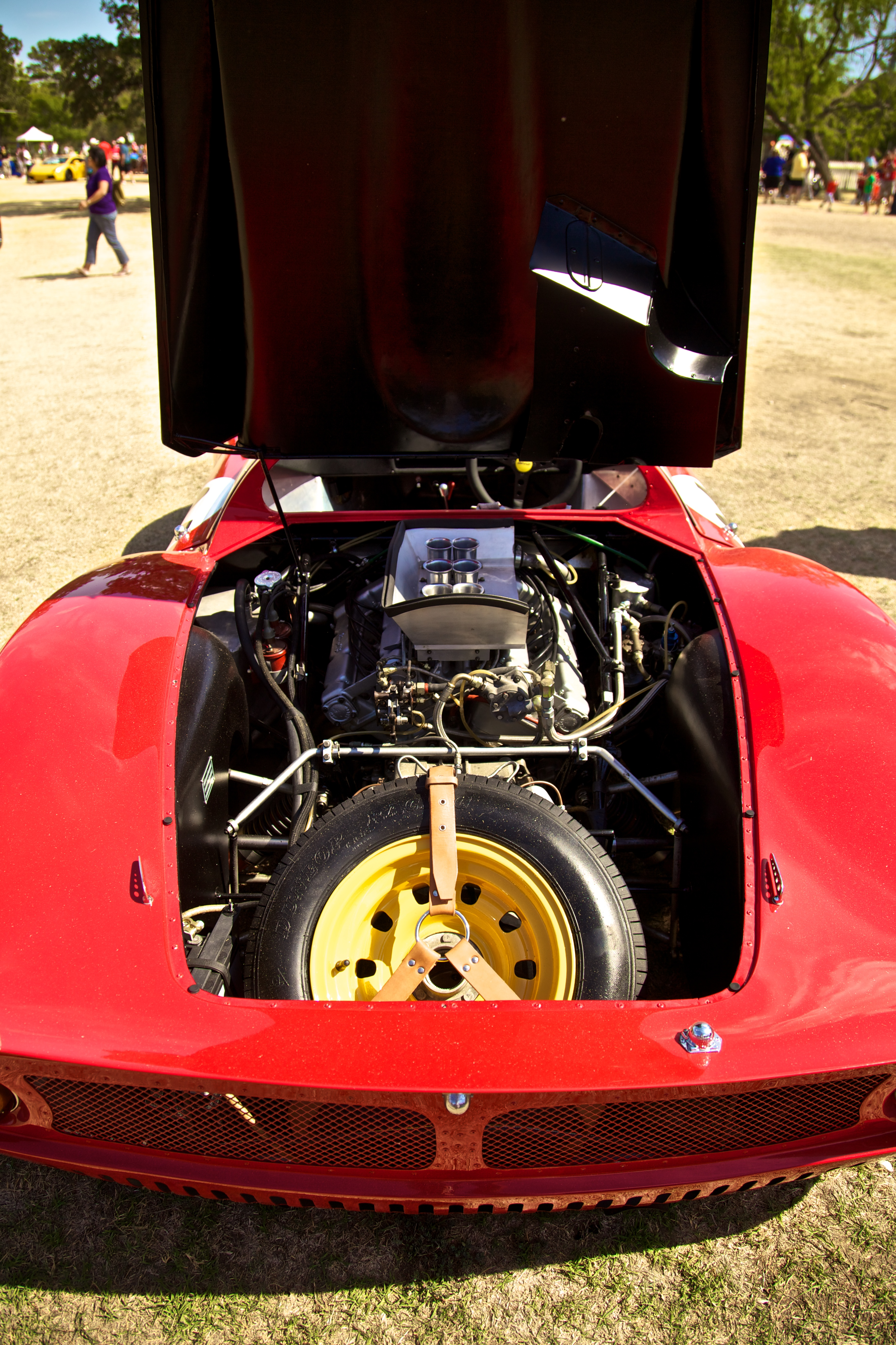
206S with spare wheel, required by Gr. 4 Sports Cars homologation that was never achieved

The last of the Dino prototype sports car models was supposed to become a Sports Car homologated in the new Group 4 S 2.0 Litre class, hence called 206 S. The rules of the time required 50 to be made, with space to carry luggage and a spare wheel. While the Porsche 906 Carrera 6 got introduced early in 1966, was raced several times as a Gr. 6 prototype until enough were made and sold to get homologated in spring of 1966, Ferrari only made 18 206 S in total until 1967, and always had to race as prototype. Its S was never earned. Entering in the prototype classes, up to 2 litre, or above, gave Ferrari the liberty to modify the car and the engine, still the 2.0 L (1,986.60 cc (121.2 cu in)) V6 based on the 206 SP powerplant. Some received experimental 3-valve heads and Lucas fuel injection.

The racing career of the 206 S in the 1966 World Sportscar Championship had some highlights, but it was mostly eclipsed by the V12 Ferrari P and the more numerous Porsche 906. This was the case at its debut in the 1966 12 Hours of Sebring, and at the first Italian home race, the 1966 1000km Monza. Then, the Dinos managed to beat the Porsches for 2.0 Prototype class wins in three consecutive WSC races, the 1966 Targa Florio, the 1966 1000 km Spa, and especially the 1966 1000 km Nürburgring with 2nd and 3d overall. The Targa class win earned Ferrari points in the P 2.0 class, but it actually was a defeat, as the overall win went to one of the customer 906 Sports Cars as the homologation was now in effect, and the numerous private 906 could earn wins and points in the S 2.0 class with hardly any opposition from other brands. In the 1966 24 Hours of Le Mans, three private Dinos as well as the factory V12s suffered DNFs while Ford won 1-2-3 followed by 4-5-6-7 Porsche 906. In 1967, Porsche upgraded to 910 and 907, and the 206 S was retired.

== Concept cars ==
Ferrari built and presented numerous design concepts and prototypes to overcame styling and engineering challenges derived from a new engine layout of a road-car. As many as six different Dino prototypes were built between 1965 and 1967. The new and revolutionary design would spawn whole generations of Dino and Ferrari mid-engine road cars.

=== Dino Berlinetta Speciale ===
The first Dino-badged concept car was presented by Ferrari and Pininfarina in 1965. It was a mid-engined, two-seater called Dino Berlinetta Speciale. The work started in March 1965. The car was designed by Aldo Brovarone who created the conceptual plans that would in the future form a basic characteristics of the production Dino cars. They were all involved in creating and packaging this concept car and ultimately the production version, Dino 206 GT, that would also be partially credited to Fioravanti as its co-designer along Brovarone. Also in 1965, Brovarone designed the Alfa Romeo Giulia 1600 Sport concept car using the similar stylistic cues but realised on a front-engined car.

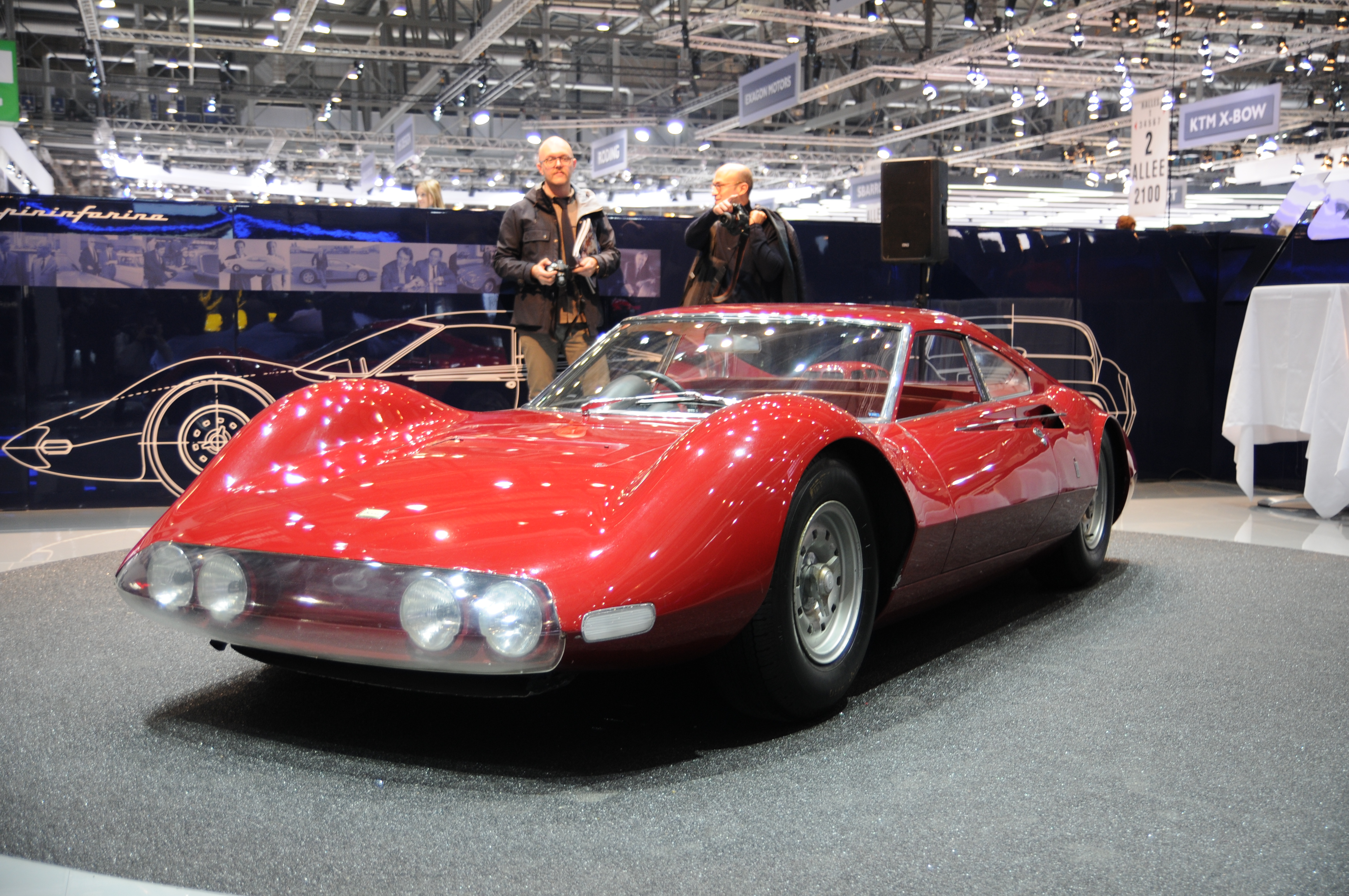
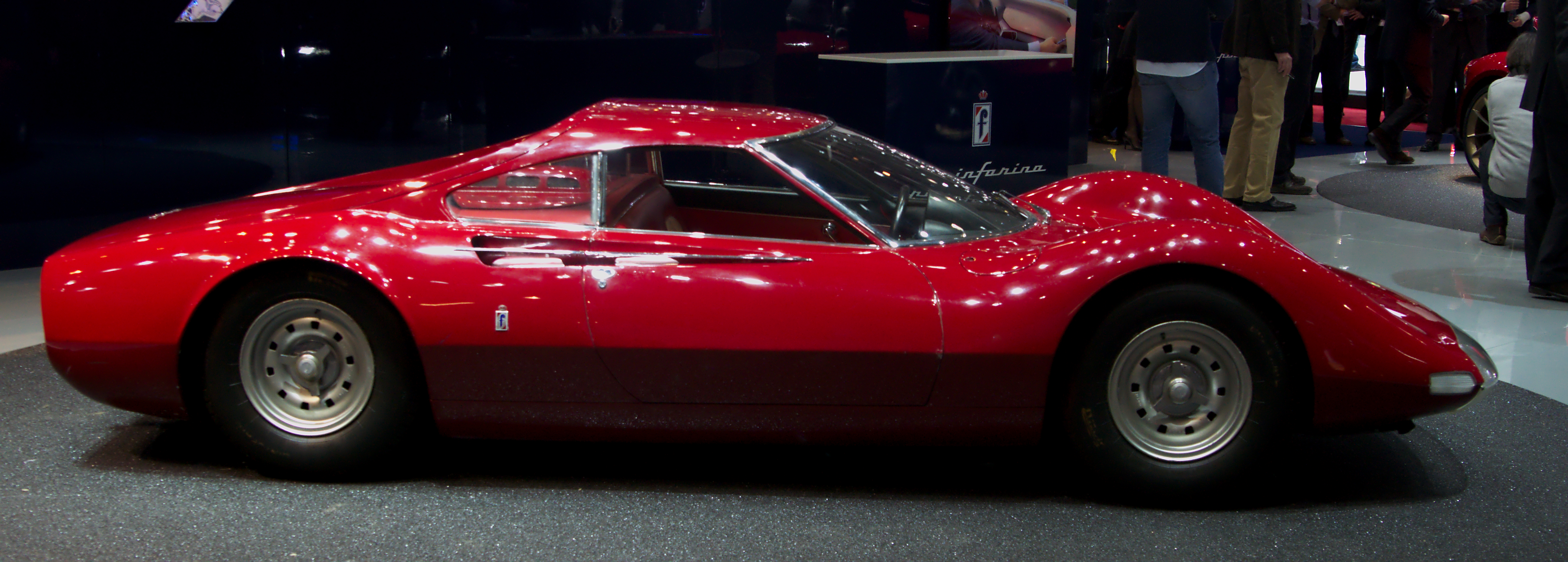
1965 Dino Berlinetta Speciale

The Berlinetta Speciale was built on a competition Type 585 tubular chassis, derived from the Dino 206 SP sports prototype, with its engine mounted longitudinally. This first Dino concept car was finished in record time by October 1965, just before the 52nd Paris Motor Show. It was built on a spare chassis s/n 0840, from Scuderia Ferrari. In November of the same year, it was exhibited at the Turin Motor Show and at the New York Motor Show in April 1966.

The short-wheelbase car had a very streamlined body with prominent wheel arches. The front of the car was very low and incorporated headlights covered with plexiglass. The elongated side air-intakes that channelled air for rear brakes cooling became a signature element of the marque range. The rear window was curved round the inclined rear pillars and were also part of the quarter-light windows. Whole rear section of the car could be opened to reveal an engine bay and spare wheel. The car and the cockpit were finished in Ferrari red and the non-adjustable seats in cream colour. The pedal box could be moved to conform to the driver. Same as on a competition car, the steering wheel was mounted on the right.

The Dino Berlinetta Speciale was sold on Artcurial auction in 2017 for €4,390,400.

=== Ferrari 365 P Berlinetta Speciale ===
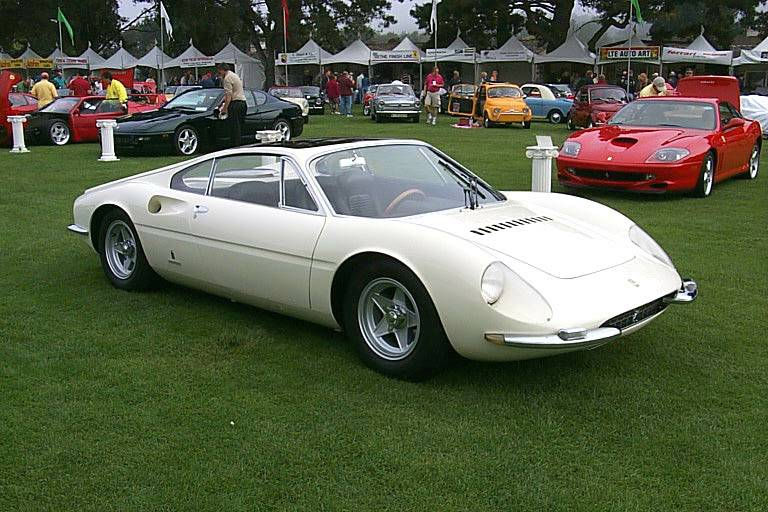
Ferrari 365 P Berlinetta Speciale

The Ferrari 365 P Berlinetta Speciale is both seen as a scaled up version of the original Dino and its predecessor, presented at the same time as the other Dino prototypes, in 1966. The Ferrari Berlinetta Speciale was also known as "Tre-Posti" for its unique seating design. Aldo Brovarone of Pininfarina was also credited with this design, but the car featured a triple seating with the driver situated in the center. Also the overall size was larger to accommodate bigger V12 powerplant.

=== Dino Berlinetta GT ===
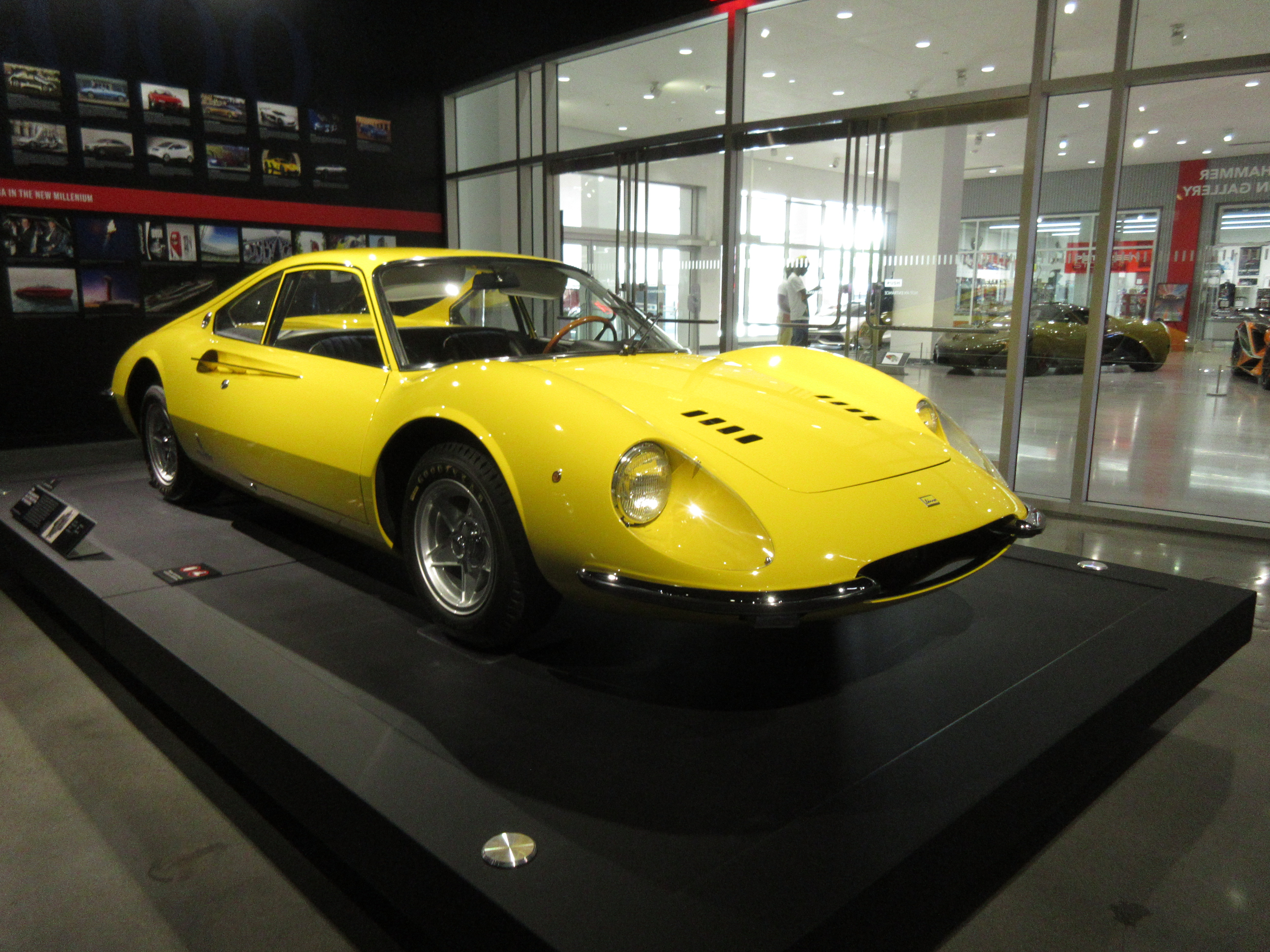
Dino Berlinetta GT prototype s/n 00106, displayed at the Petersen Automotive Museum

In 1966, Pininfarina designed an evolution over the previous concept car, the Dino Berlinetta GT prototype. It was presented in November 1966, at the 48th Turin Motor Show and previewed the production Dino road car that would be presented a year later at the same venue.

The prototype had three round taillights mounted on a chrome background and turn signals below the front grille. The entire body was longer than the production car as was its wheelbase at 2,340 mm (92.1 in). The reason was that the 2.0-liter V6 was mounted longitudinally in the middle of the car. The engine however was no longer a competition unit, rather a road-car sourced Type 135B. The same as before, the engine was accessed by a large lid hinged on the roof of the car that incorporated the buttresses and rear convex window. The side air intakes were elongated, featuring chrome bars that also functioned as door handles. The chassis was also different from the previous concept, now a Type 599. The chassis number 00106 was assigned in 1967 from the road car sequence.

The yellow-painted Dino Berlinetta GT prototype was sold in 2018 at Gooding & Company auction for US$3,080,000.

=== Dino Berlinetta Competizione ===
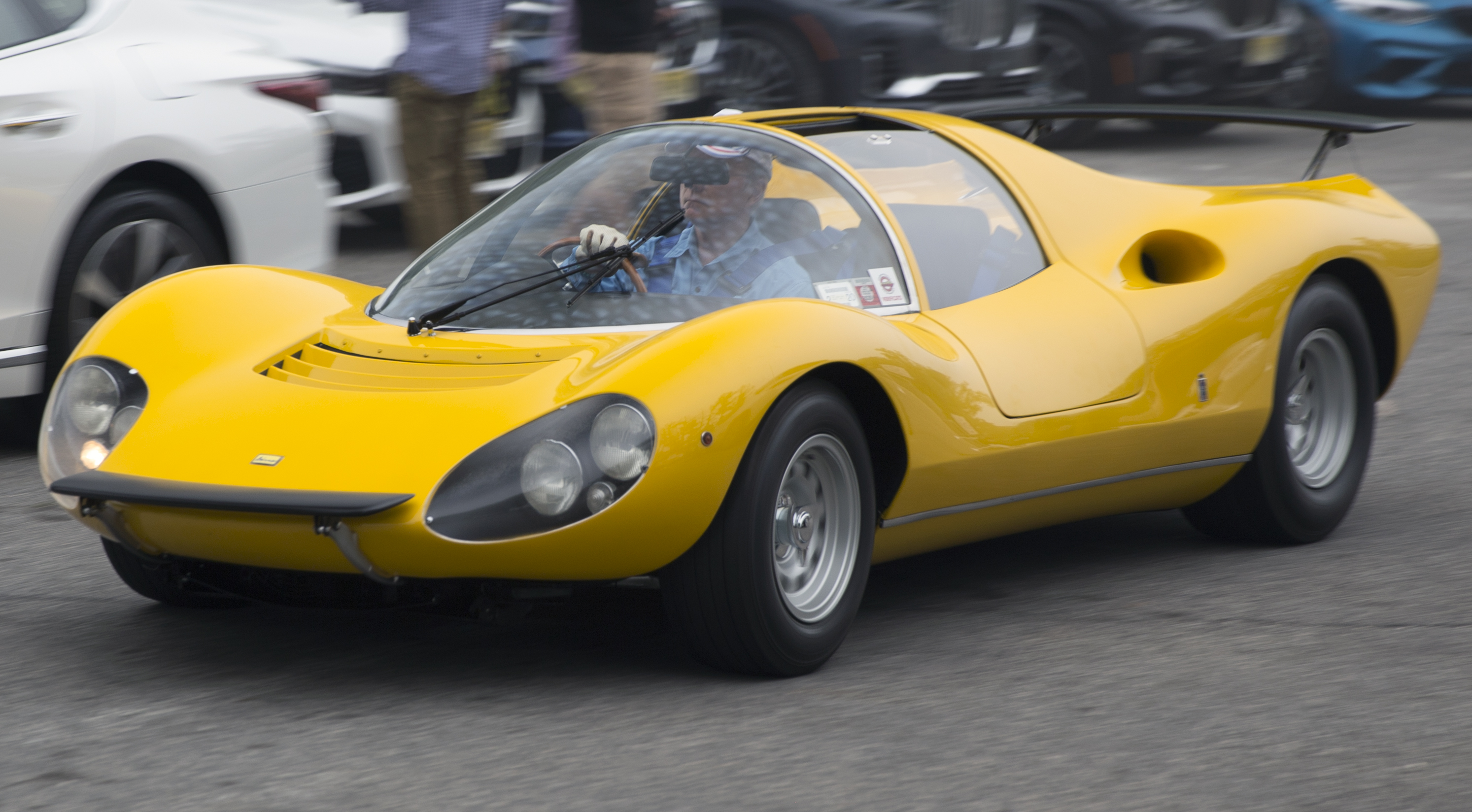
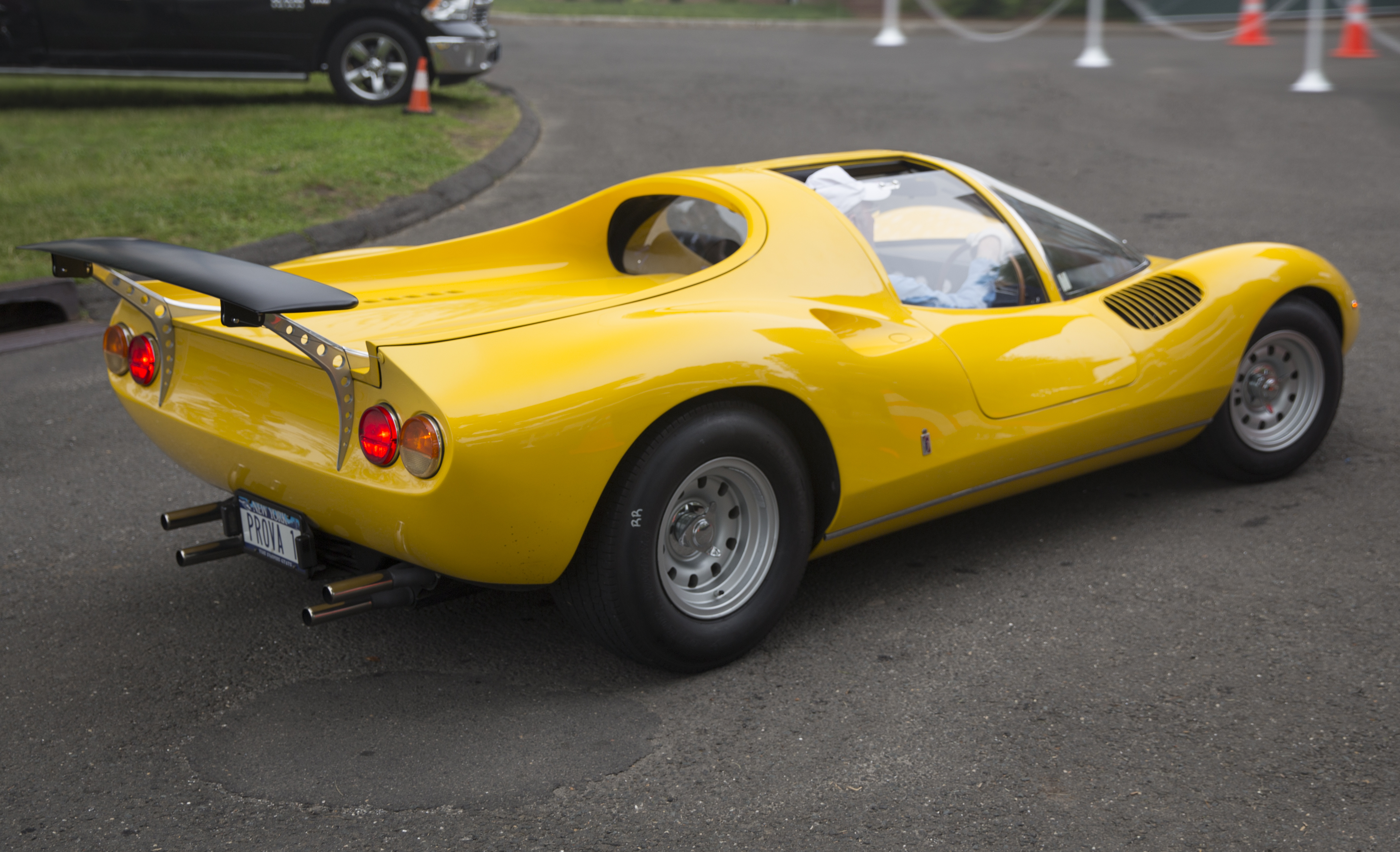
Dino Berlinetta Competizione

At the 1967 Frankfurt Motor Show, Pininfarina and Ferrari unveiled the Dino Berlinetta Competizione. It was a concept car designed by a young designer, Paolo Martin. It was an exclusive design study as well as a working prototype but was never intended to enter production. The concept was based on a Dino 206 S racing chassis s/n 034, one of the last of the series. The engine was a Type 231/B with an improved 3-valve heads.

Some of the design cues were influenced by the existing Dino competition cars. The whole creative process took no longer than four months. The overall rounded shape was later modified with addition of the front and rear spoilers. The gullwing doors featured a curved glass that would slide into the door structure.

== Road cars ==
The Dino road cars marque was created to market a lower priced, more affordable sports car capable of taking on the Porsche 911. Ferrari's expensive V12s well exceeded the 911 in both performance and price. Enzo Ferrari did not want to diminish his exclusive brand with a cheaper car, so the Dino was created.

Although a mid-engine layout was common in the world of sports car racing at the time, adapting it to a production car was quite daring. Such a design placed more of the car's weight over the driven wheels, and allowed for a streamlined nose, but led to a cramped passenger compartment and more challenging handling. Lamborghini created a stir in 1966 with its mid-engined Miura, but Enzo Ferrari felt a mid-engine Ferrari would be unsafe in the hands of his customers. Eventually he partially relented and a mid-engined Dino concept car was built for the 1965 Paris Motor Show. Response to the radically styled car was positive, so Ferrari allowed it to go into production, rationalizing the lower power of the V6 engine would result in a more manageable car.

=== Dino 206 GT ===
Dino 206 GT
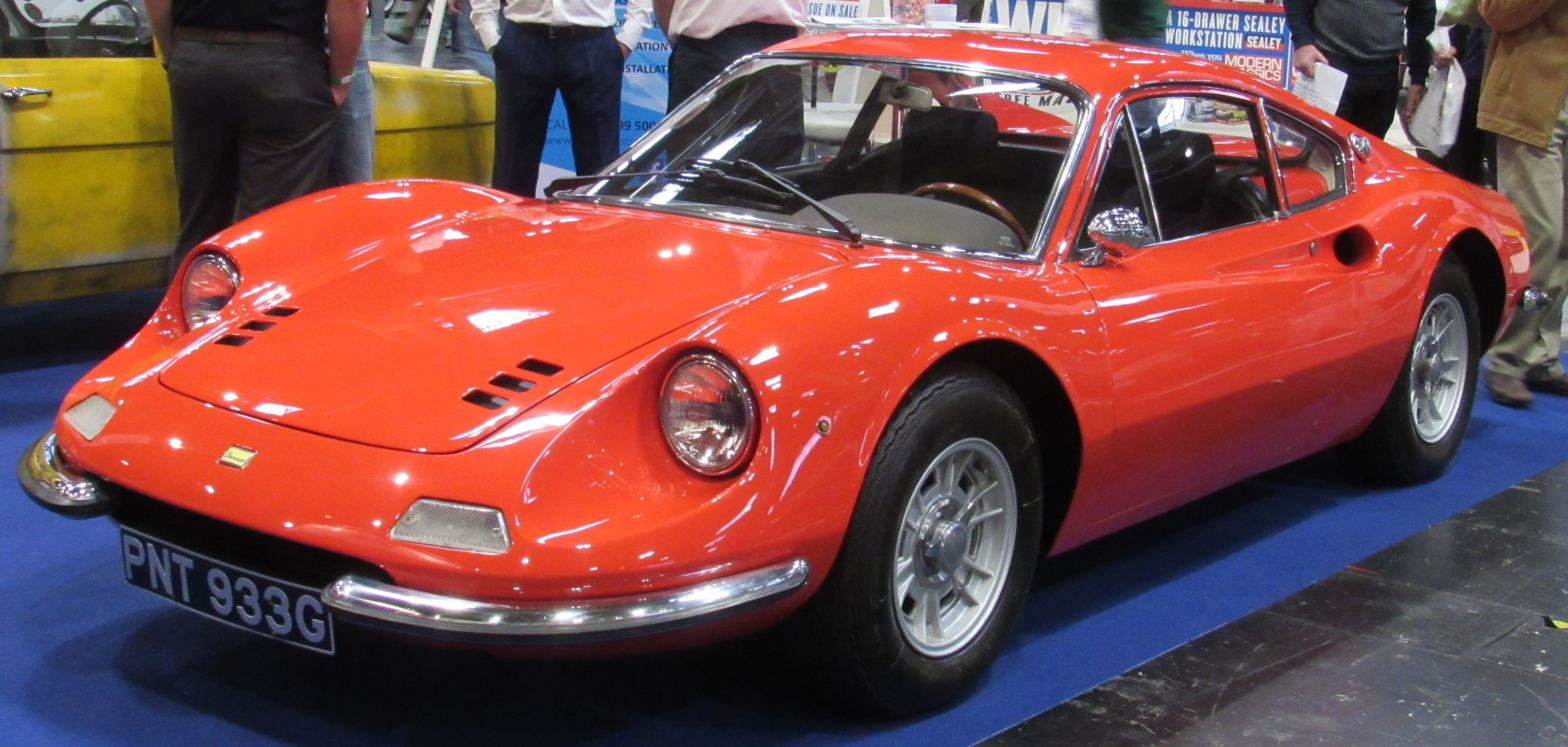

Overview
- Also called: Ferrari Dino 206 GT
- Production: 1967–1969; 152 produced
- Designer: Aldo Brovarone at Pininfarina

Body and chassis
- Body style: Berlinetta

Powertrain
- Engine: 2.0 L (1,986.60 cc) Dino 65° V6
- Transmission: 5-speed manual

The first road-going Dino was the 1967 Dino 206 GT, designed by Aldo Brovarone at Pininfarina.

The 206 GT used a transverse-mounted 2.0 L all-aluminium 65-degree V6 engine, with 180 PS (132 kW; 178 hp) at 8,000 rpm, the same used in the Fiat Dino. The 206 GT frame featured an aluminium body, full independent suspension, and all round disc brakes. 152 were built in total between 1967 and 1969, in left hand drive only.

=== Dino 246 GT and GTS ===
Dino 246 GT and GTS
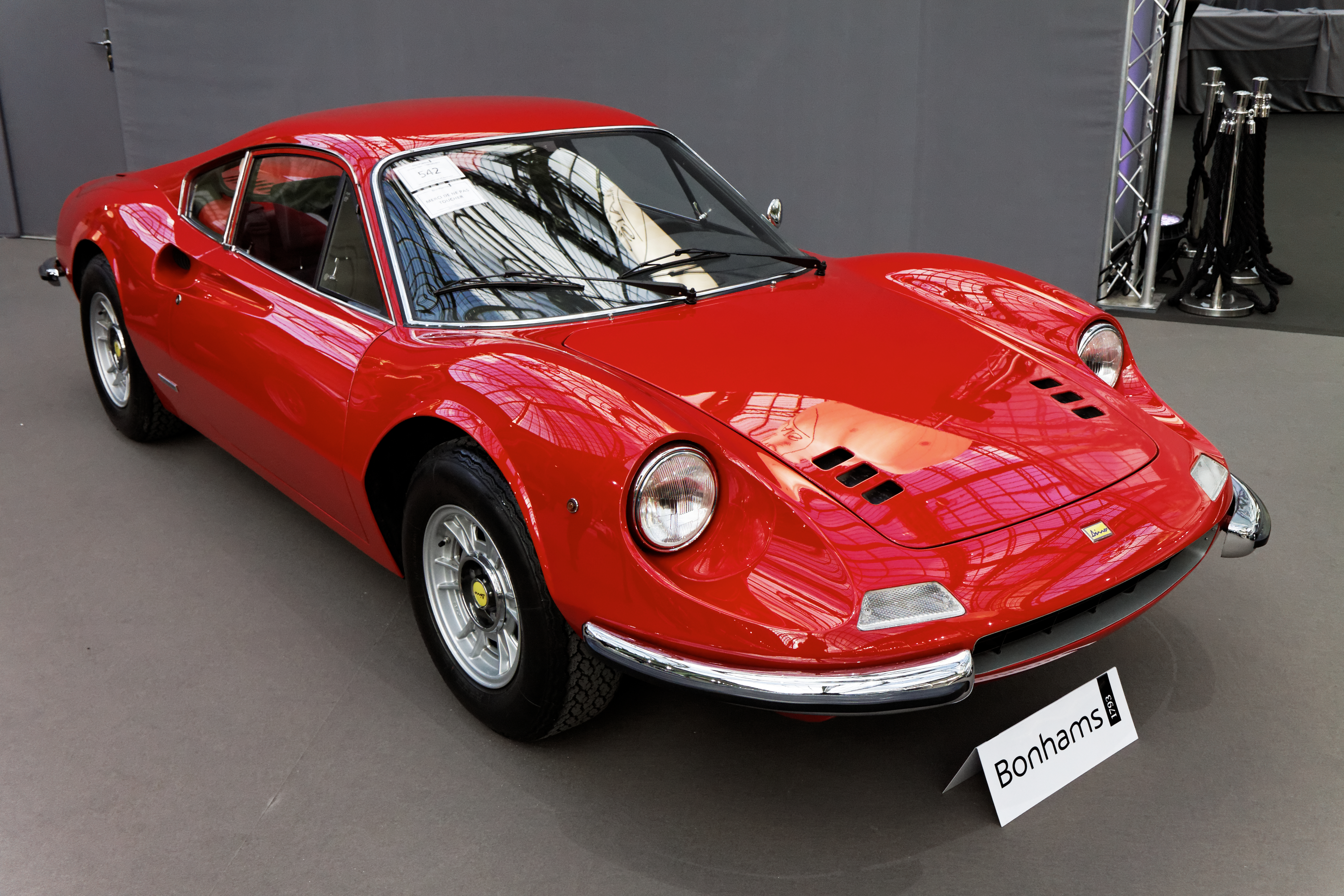

Overview
- Production: 1969–1974

Body and chassis
- Body style: Berlinetta; Targa top

Powertrain
- Engine: 2.4 L (2,419.20 cc) Dino 65° V6
- Transmission: 5-speed manual

In 1969 the 206 GT was superseded by the more powerful Dino 246 GT. The 246 GT was powered by an enlarged 2,419.20 cc (147.6 cu in; 2.4 L) V6 engine, producing 195 PS (143 kW; 192 hp) at 7,600 rpm in European specification. Initially available as a fixed-top GT coupé, a targa topped GTS was also offered after 1971.

Other notable changes from the 206 were the body, now made of steel instead of aluminium, and a 60 mm (2.4 in) longer wheelbase than the 206. Three series of the Dino 246 GT were built, with differences in wheels, windshield wiper coverage, and engine ventilation. Dino 246 production numbered 2,295 GTs and 1,274 GTSs, for a total production run of 3,569.

=== Dino 308/208 GT4 ===
Dino 308 GT4 Dino 208 GT4
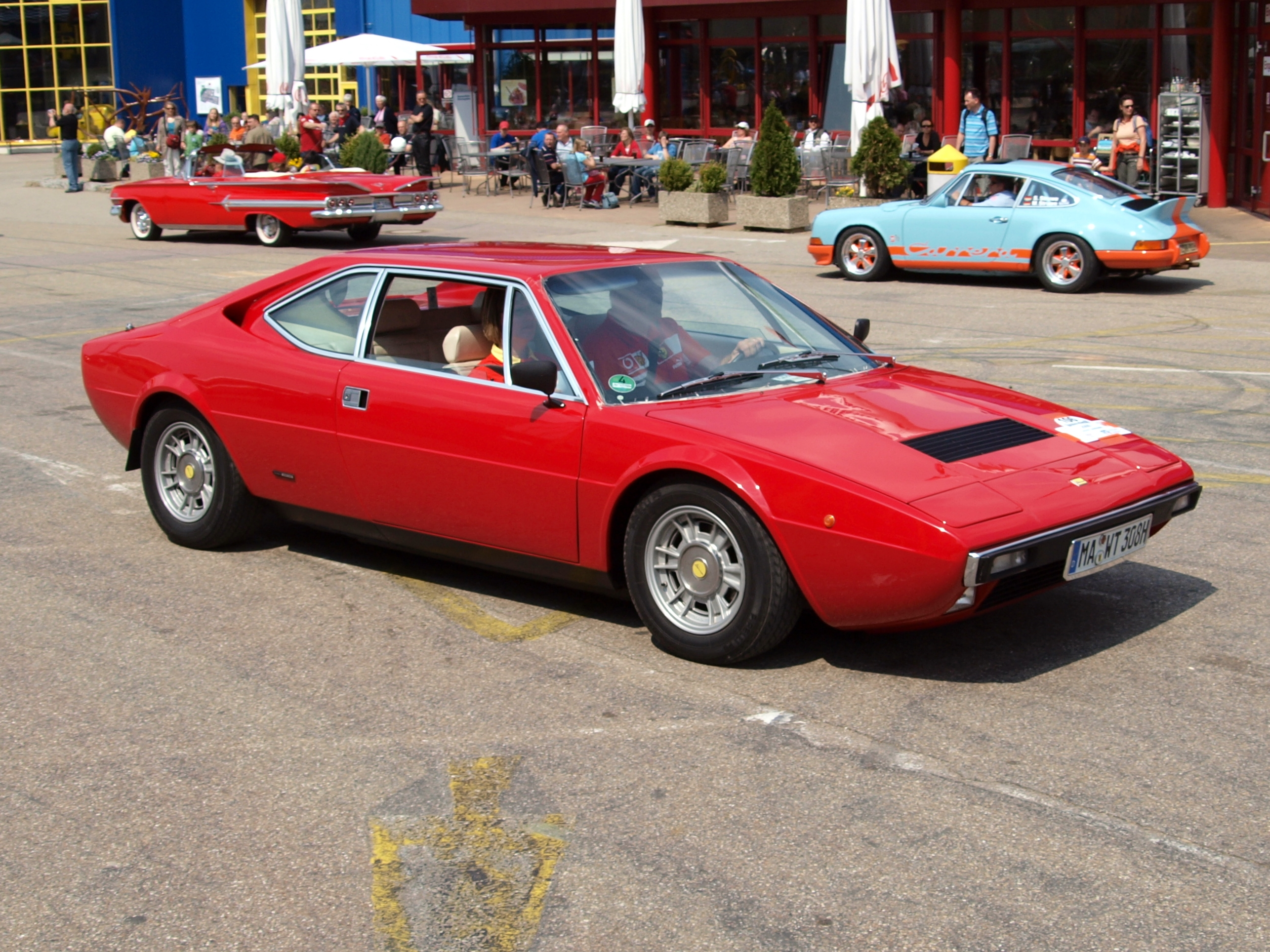

Overview
- Manufacturer: Ferrari
- Production: 1973–1976 (branded as Dino); 1976–1980 (branded as Ferrari)
- Designer: Marcello Gandini at Bertone

Body and chassis
- Body style: 2+2 coupé
- Related: Ferrari 308 GTB

Powertrain
- Engine: 2.0 L Dino V8; 2.9 L Dino V8

Chronology
- Successor: Ferrari Mondial

The 308 GT4 was produced from 1973 to April 1980. Initially branded "Dino", the 308 GT4 was Ferrari's first V8-engined production automobile.

The 308 was a 2+2 with a wheelbase of 100.4 inches (2,550 mm). The 308 was designed by Bertone; with its angular wedge shape, it looked quite different from the 206/246 from which it was derived.

The 308 GT4 had a 2,927 cc (178.6 cu in; 2.9 L), 90-degree V-8 with twin overhead camshafts per bank and two valves per cylinder. Fuel was fed by four Weber 40DCNF carburettors which produced 255 PS (188 kW; 252 hp) at 7700 rpm. The V-8 block and heads were made of an aluminium alloy. The compression ratio was 8.8:1. The American version had a timing change and catalytic converters; it produced a more modest 205 PS (151 kW; 202 hp). For the 1,991 cc (121.5 cu in; 2.0 L) 208 GT4, an Italian market model, manufacturer claimed 180 PS (132 kW; 178 hp). The GT4 weighed 1,150 kg (2,535 lb) dry.

The 308 GT4 wore the Dino badge until May 1976, when it finally got the Ferrari "Prancing Horse" badge on the hood, wheels, and the steering wheel.
