= 1969 Tasman Series =

Motor racing competition

Seasons
- ← 1968 1970 →

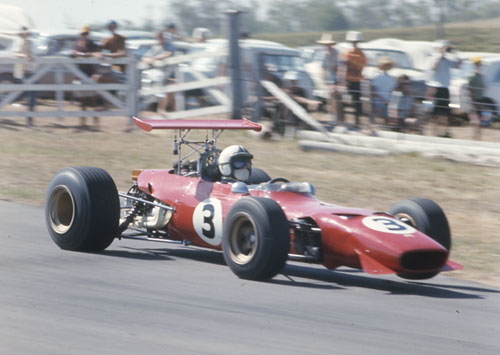
1969 Tasman Series winner Chris Amon (Ferrari Dino 246T/69) at Lakeside for the Australian Grand Prix

The 1969 Tasman Series was a motor racing competition staged in New Zealand and Australia for cars complying with the Tasman Formula. The series, which commenced on 4 January 1969 and ended on 16 February 1969 after seven rounds, was the sixth annual Tasman Series. It was won by Chris Amon, driving a Ferrari Dino 246T/69.

Unfortunately due to the growing commercial nature of Formula One, 1969 would be something of a watershed for the Tasman Series as it was the last one attended by the top Grand Prix drivers such as Jack Brabham, Denny Hulme, Graham Hill, Chris Amon, Piers Courage and Jochen Rindt. Formula One teams who were regulars in the Tasman such as Brabham, Lotus, BRM and Ferrari were finding it increasingly difficult to justify financing what was becoming just a secondary championship half a world away from the centre of F1, Europe and Britain.

The season was no defending champions after the fatal accident of Jim Clark in Hockenheimring on 1968.

== Races ==
The series was contested over seven races.

Round		Name	Circuit	Date	Winning driver	Car	Entrant	Report
New Zealand	1	New Zealand Grand Prix	Pukekohe	4 January	(New Zealand) Chris Amon	Ferrari Dino 246T/69	Scuderia Veloce	Report
New Zealand	2	Levin International	Levin	11 January	(New Zealand) Chris Amon	Ferrari Dino 246T/69	Scuderia Veloce	Report
New Zealand	3	Lady Wigram Trophy	Wigram	19 January	(Austria) Jochen Rindt	Lotus 49B Ford Cosworth DFW	World Wide Racing	Report
New Zealand	4	Teretonga International	Teretonga	25 January	(United Kingdom) Piers Courage	Brabham BT24 Ford Cosworth DFW	Frank Williams Racing	Report
Australia	5	Australian Grand Prix	Lakeside	2 February	(New Zealand) Chris Amon	Ferrari Dino 246T/69	Scuderia Veloce	Report
Australia	6	Warwick Farm International	Warwick Farm	9 February	(Austria) Jochen Rindt	Lotus 49B Ford Cosworth DFW	World Wide Racing	Report
Australia	7	Sandown International 100	Sandown	16 February	(New Zealand) Chris Amon	Ferrari Dino 246T/69	Scuderia Veloce	Report

== Points system ==
Series points were awarded at each race on the following basis.

Position	1	2	3	4	5	6
Points	9	6	4	3	2	1

All points scored by each driver were retained to determine final series placings.

== Series standings ==
Pos	Driver	Car	Entrant	Puk	Lev	Wig	Ter	Lak	War	San	Pts
1	(New Zealand) Chris Amon	Ferrari Dino 246T/69	Scuderia Veloce	1	1	3	3	1	Ret	1	44
2	(Austria) Jochen Rindt	Lotus 49B Ford Cosworth DFW	Gold Leaf Team Lotus; World Wide Racing	2	Ret	1	Ret	Ret	1	2	30
3	(United Kingdom) Piers Courage	Brabham BT24 Ford Cosworth DFW	Frank Williams Racing	3	2	4	1	Ret	Ret	Ret	22
4	(United Kingdom) Derek Bell	Ferrari Dino 246T/69	Scuderia Veloce	4	Ret	5	5	2	2	5	21
5	(United Kingdom) Graham Hill	Lotus 49B Ford Cosworth DFW	Gold Leaf Team Lotus; World Wide Racing	Ret	Ret	2	2	4	11	6	16
6	(Australia) Frank Gardner	Mildren Mono Alfa Romeo	Alec Mildren Racing	Ret	3	Ret	4	Ret	3	4	14
7	(Australia) Leo Geoghegan	Lotus 39 Repco	Geoghegan Racing Division	5	4	Ret		3	5	DNS	11
8	(Australia) Jack Brabham	Brabham BT31 Repco								3	4
9	(Australia) Kevin Bartlett	Brabham BT23E Alfa Romeo	Alec Mildren Racing					Ret	4	Ret	3
=	(New Zealand) Graeme Lawrence	McLaren M4A Ford Cosworth FVA	Lawrence Racing	6	5	12	Ret		8	Ret	3
=	(Australia) Neil Allen	McLaren M4A Ford Cosworth FVA	NE Allen Competition Pty. Ltd.					5	6	11	3
12	(New Zealand) Roly Levis	Brabham BT23C Ford Cosworth FVA	Team Lexington	7	9	6	6		7	7	2
13	(New Zealand) Graham McRae	McRae 69 Ford		Ret	6	7	Ret				1
=	(Australia) Max Stewart	Mildren Alfa Romeo	Alec Mildren Racing					6			1
—	(United Kingdom) Malcolm Guthrie	Brabham BT21B Ford	Frank Williams Racing		8	10	10	7	10	10	0
—	(New Zealand) Bert Hawthorne	Brabham BT21 Ford	Team Lexington	12	7	8	11				0
—	(New Zealand) Laurence Brownlie	Brabham BT23C Ford Cosworth FVA	Team Lexington	11	DNS	Ret	7				0
—	(Australia) Glyn Scott	Bowin P3 Ford Cosworth FVA	Glyn Scott Motors					8	9	9	0
—	(New Zealand) Red Dawson	Brabham BT7A Coventry Climax FPF		8	Ret	9	13				0
—	(New Zealand) David Oxton	Brabham BT16 Ford		9	Ret	Ret	8				0
—	(Australia) Garrie Cooper	Elfin 600B Ford								8	0
—	(New Zealand) Ken Smith	Lotus 41 Ford		DNS		Ret	9				0
—	(New Zealand) Frank Radisich	HCM Ford Cosworth FVA	Henderson Central Motors	10	DNS	Ret	15				0
—	(New Zealand) John Nicholson	Brabham BT18 Ford		Ret		11	12				0
—	(New Zealand) Wayne Murdoch	Brabham BT10 Ford				DNS	14				0
—	(New Zealand) Dennis Marwood	Brabham BT22 Coventry Climax FPF	Rorstan Motor Racing	Ret	Ret	Ret					0
—	(Australia) Alfredo Costanzo	McLaren M4A Ford Cosworth FVA	Argo Racing Pty. Ltd.					Ret	Ret	Ret	0
—	(Australia) Col Green	Brabham BT16 Coventry Climax FPF	Col Green					Ret	??	Ret	0
—	(Australia) Henk Woelders	Elfin 600B Ford	Bill Patterson Motors					Ret		Ret	0
—	(New Zealand) Vince Anderson	Brabham BT11A Coventry Climax FPF		??		Ret					0
—	(New Zealand) Peter Moloney	Cooper T66 Coventry Climax FPF				Ret					0
—	(New Zealand) Barry Keen	Begg Mono Ford					Ret				0
—	(Australia) Clive Mills	Rennmax BN2 Ford							Ret		0
—	(Australia) John Harvey	Brabham BT23E Repco								Ret	0
—	(Australia) Maurie Quincey	Elfin 600B Ford								Ret	0
—	(New Zealand) Bryan Faloon	Brabham BT4 Coventry Climax FPF		DNS							0
—	(New Zealand) Peter Hughes	Lotus 25/33 Daimler			DNS						0
Pos	Driver	Car	Entrant	Puk	Lev	Wig	Ter	Lak	War	San	Pts

Colour	Result
Gold	Winner
Silver	Second place
Bronze	Third place
Green	Points classification
Blue	Non-points classification
Blue	Non-classified finish (NC)
Purple	Retired, not classified (Ret)
Red	Did not qualify (DNQ)
Red	Did not pre-qualify (DNPQ)
Black	Disqualified (DSQ)
White	Did not start (DNS)
White	Withdrew (WD)
White	Race cancelled (C)
Blank	Did not practice (DNP)
Blank	Did not arrive (DNA)
Blank	Excluded (EX)
