= 1968 Surfers Paradise 6 Hour =

Coordinates: 28°0′59″S 153°22′34″E

The 1968 Surfers Paradise 6 Hour was an endurance race for sports cars and touring cars, staged at the Surfers Paradise International Raceway in Queensland, Australia on 1 September 1968.

The race was dominated by the Matich SR3 Repco V8 driven by Frank Matich and Glynn Scott, however an engine failure with just over an hour to run handed the victory to the Ferrari 250LM driven by brothers Leo and Ian Geoghegan.

== Results ==
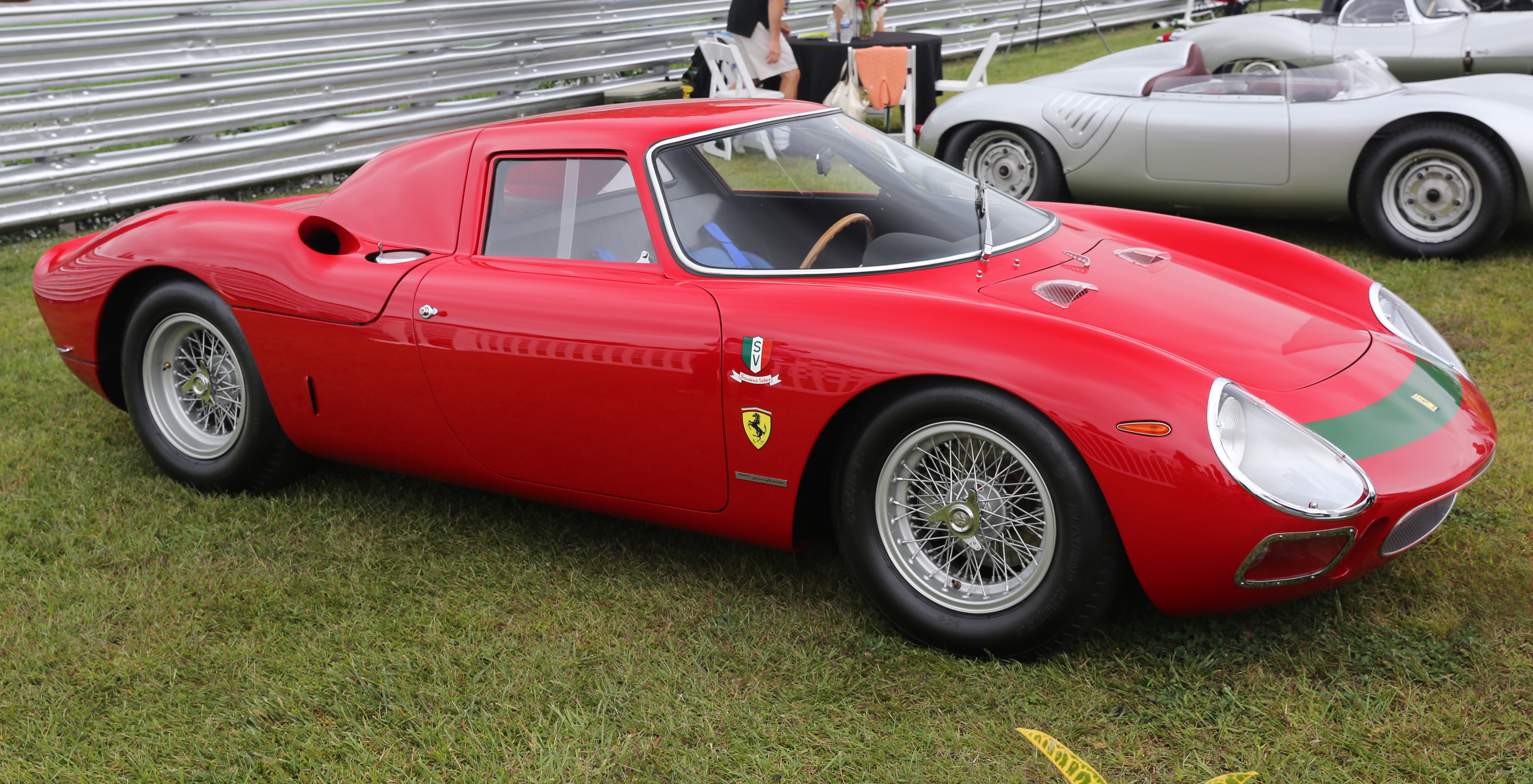
Leo Geoghegan and Ian Geoghegan won the race driving a Ferrari 250LM for Scuderia Veloce

Position	Drivers	No.	Car	Entrant	Laps
1	Leo Geoghegan, Ian Geoghegan	18	Ferrari 250LM	Scuderia Veloce	249
2	Bill Gates, Jim Bertram	21	Lotus Elan	Bill Gates	237
3	Doug Whiteford, John Roxburgh, Frank Coad	4	Datsun 2000	Datsun Racing Team	230
4	Fritz Kahout, Don O'Sullivan, Howie Sangster, Stan Starcevich	51	Porsche 911S	F. Kahout	224
5	Don Holland, John French	8	Morris Cooper S	Don Holland Motors	220
6	Kevin Bartlett, Doug Chivas	38	Alfa Romeo 1750 GTV	Alec Mildren Racing	220
	Sports Racing Over 2000 c.c.				
1	Leo Geoghegan, Ian Geoghegan	18	Ferrari 250LM	Scuderia Veloce	249
DNF	Frank Matich, Glyn Scott	19	Matich SR3 Repco	Frank Matich Pty. Ltd.	
DNF	Don O'Sullivan, Baltzer, Bassett	16	Lola T70 Mk II	Don O'Sullivan Racing	
DNF	Jim Palmer, Bill Brown	17	Ferrari P4	Scuderia Veloce	
	Sports Racing up to 2000 c.c.				
1	Doug Whiteford, John Roxburgh, Frank Coad	4	Datsun 2000	Datsun Racing Team	230
2	Don Holland, John French	8	Morris Cooper S	Don Holland Motors	220
3	Fred Sayer, James Tedman	3	Morris	F. G. Sayers	201
?	Evan Thomas, Geoff Bernhagen	24	NSU Prinz	J. Thomas & Sons	
	Improved Production Sports Cars over 2000 c.c.				
1	Phil West, George Reynolds	61	Ferrari 275 GTB-C.C.	Scuderia Veloce	216
	Improved Production Sports Cars up to 2000 c.c.				
1	Bill Gates, Jim Bertram	21	Lotus Elan	Bill Gates	237
2	Doug Whiteford, John Roxburgh	23	Datsun 2000	Datsun Racing Team	201
?	John Leffler, Les Carne	26	MG Midget	Philishave Racing Team	
DNF	Kerry Horgan, Harry Cape, Ian Ferguson	22	Triumph GT6	Harry Cape	
	Series Production Sports Cars up to 2000 c.c.				
1	Fritz Kahout, Don O'Sullivan, Howie Sangster, Stan Starcevich	51	Porsche 911S	F. Kahout	224
2	Brian Foley, Laurie Stewart	52	Alfa Romeo 1750 GTV	Brian Foley Motors	219
3	R. Rouse	53	Datsun 2000	R. Rouse	208
	Improved Production Touring Cars over 2000 c.c.				
1	Bill Evans, Max Volkers	41	Ford Falcon V8	D. Evans	207
2	Paul Zacka, Graham Perry	42	Holden V8 Automatic	Howsans Garage & Body Service	205
	Improved Production Touring Cars up to 2000 c.c.				
1	Kevin Bartlett, Doug Chivas	38	Alfa Romeo 1750 GTV	Alec Mildren Racing	220
2	Bill Goode, Brian Michelmore	33	Alfa Romeo 1600 GTV	Bill Goode	217
3	Tony Basile, Joe Vasta	31	Fiat 125	Willys Motors	208
?	Don O'Sullivan, Ted Lisle	37	Morris Cooper S	Don O'Sullivan Racing	
DNF	David Seldon, Ron Kearns	34	Volvo 122S	British & Continental Cars	
