= 1995 Australian Formula Ford Championship =

Motor racing competition

The 1995 Australian Formula Ford Championship was a CAMS sanctioned motor racing championship open to Formula Ford racing cars. The championship was the 26th Australian series for Formula Fords, and the third to be contested under the Australian Formula Ford Championship name. The title was won by Jason Bright, driving a Van Diemen RF95.

== Calendar ==
The championship was contested over an eight-round series with two races per round.

| Round | Circuit | Dates | Round winner | Map |
|---|---|---|---|---|
| 1 | (Victoria (state)) Sandown Raceway | 5 February | (Australia) Jason Bright | 1995 Australian Formula Ford Championship is located in Australia |
| 2 | (Tasmania) Symmons Plains Raceway | 26 February | (Australia) Gavin Monaghan | 1995 Australian Formula Ford Championship is located in Australia |
| 3 | (New South Wales) Mount Panorama Circuit | 12 March | (Australia) Gavin Monaghan | 1995 Australian Formula Ford Championship is located in Australia |
| 4 | (Victoria (state)) Phillip Island Grand Prix Circuit | 9 April | (Australia) Jason Bright (Australia) Mark Webber | 1995 Australian Formula Ford Championship is located in Australia |
| 5 | (Queensland) Lakeside International Raceway | 23 April | (Australia) Jason Bright | 1995 Australian Formula Ford Championship is located in Australia |
| 6 | (New South Wales) Eastern Creek Raceway | 28 May | (Australia) Jason Bright | 1995 Australian Formula Ford Championship is located in Australia |
| 7 | (South Australia) Mallala Motor Sport Park | 9 July | (Australia) Mark Noske | 1995 Australian Formula Ford Championship is located in Australia |
| 8 | (New South Wales) Oran Park Raceway | 6 August | (Australia) Cameron Partington | 1995 Australian Formula Ford Championship is located in Australia |

== Results ==
Championship points were awarded at each race on the following basis:

| Position | 1st | 2nd | 3rd | 4th | 5th | 6th | 7th | 8th | 9th | 10th |
|---|---|---|---|---|---|---|---|---|---|---|
| Points | 20 | 16 | 14 | 12 | 10 | 8 | 6 | 4 | 2 | 1 |

| Pos | Driver | No. | Car | Entrant | (Victoria (state)) SAN | (Tasmania) SYM | (New South Wales) BAT | (Victoria (state)) PHI | (Queensland) LAK | (New South Wales) EAS | (South Australia) MAL | (New South Wales) ORA | Pts |
|---|---|---|---|---|---|---|---|---|---|---|---|---|---|
| 1 | (Australia) Jason Bright | 3 | Van Diemen RF95 | Valvoline Australia | 36 | 28 | 34 | 36 | 40 | 40 | 10 | 8 | 232 |
| 2 | (Australia) Gavin Monaghan | 2 | Van Diemen RF94 | The Anchorage Port Stephens | 28 | 30 | 36 | 14 | 22 | 20 | 4 | 20 | 174 |
| 3 | (Australia) Mark Noske | 4 | Van Diemen RF95 | AMSA Team Agip | 28 | 10 | - | 22 | 32 | 16 | 40 | 16 | 164 |
| 4 | (Australia) Mark Webber | 14 | Van Diemen RF95 | Yellow Pages Racing Team | 20 | 26 | 30 | 36 | 8 | 26 | 12 | - | 158 |
| 5 | (Australia) Iccy Harrington | 12 | Van Diemen RF93 | David Harrington | 20 | 8 | - | 22 | 4 | 26 | 18 | 14 | 112 |
| 6 | (Australia) Dugal McDougall | 48 | Van Diemen RF94 | McDougall Motorsport | - | 20 | 6 | 1 | 20 | 12 | 30 | - | 89 |
| 7 | (Australia) Mal Rose RY | 44 | Van Diemen RF94 | Mal Rose | 4 | - | - | - | 28 | 8 | 30 | - | 70 |
| 8 | (Australia) Con Toparis | | Van Diemen RF95 | AMSA Team Agip | 20 | - | 18 | 16 | - | - | - | - | 54 |
| 9 | (Australia) Ashley Cutchie | 8 | Van Diemen RF93; Swift SC95K | | 1 | - | 24 | 8 | - | 1 | 6 | 12 | 52 |
| = | (Australia) Jason Bargwanna | 18 | Reynard FF88 | Ugly Kid Racing | 6 | - | 18 | - | - | 10 | 10 | 8 | 52 |
| 11 | (Australia) Daniel Orr | 79 | Van Diemen RF92 | Daniel Orr | - | - | - | 16 | - | 14 | - | 16 | 46 |
| 12 | (Australia) Steven Boulden | | Van Diemen RF94 | | - | 26 | 8 | - | - | - | - | - | 34 |
| 13 | (Australia) Darren Pate | 49 | Van Diemen RF95 | AMSA Team Agip | 6 | 4 | - | - | 6 | - | 1 | 12 | 29 |
| = | (Australia) Paul Stephenson | 41 | Swift SC95K | Paul Stephenson | 4 | - | 4 | 6 | 10 | 5 | - | - | 29 |
| 15 | (Australia) Cameron Partington | | Van Diemen RF94 | | - | - | - | - | - | 2 | - | 24 | 22 |
| 16 | (Australia) Adam Moore | | Swift SC95K | | - | 22 | - | - | - | - | - | - | 0 |
| 17 | (Australia) Tim Grant | 72 | Van Diemen RF95 | AMSA Team Agip | - | 6 | - | - | 7 | - | 8 | - | 21 |
| = | (Australia) Darren Edwards | 7 | Spectrum 05B | Darren Edwards | - | 4 | 7 | - | - | - | 10 | - | 21 |
| 19 | (Australia) Todd Kelly | 78 | Van Diemen RF93 | Todd Kelly | - | - | - | - | - | - | - | 20 | 20 |
| 20 | (Australia) Scott Bargwanna | 50 | Reynard FF90 | Scott Bargwanna | - | - | - | - | 6 | - | 2 | 6 | 14 |
| 21 | (Australia) Peter Fitzgerald | | Van Diemen RF92 | Peter Fitzgerald | - | - | - | 9 | - | - | 4 | - | 13 |
| 22 | (Australia) Gary Gasatti | 24 | Van Diemen RF95 | Fastlane Racing | 10 | 2 | - | - | - | - | - | - | 12 |
| 23 | (Australia) Tremaine Dickinson | 98 | Swift SC93F; Van Diemen RF91 | | - | - | 1 | - | - | - | - | 10 | 11 |
| 24 | (Australia) Jason Hannagan | | Van Diemen RF91 | | - | - | - | - | - | - | - | 10 | 10 |
| 25 | (Australia) Justin Cotter | | Swift SC93F | | - | - | - | - | - | - | - | 6 | 6 |
| 26 | (Australia) David Besnard | | Van Diemen RF90 | | - | - | - | - | - | 4 | - | - | 4 |
| 27 | (Australia) Richard Renato | | Swift SC92F | | 3 | - | - | - | - | - | - | - | 3 |
| 28 | (Australia) Geoff Walters | | Van Diemen RF94 | | - | - | - | - | 2 | - | - | - | 2 |
| = | (Australia) William Anderson | | Van Diemen RF93 | William Anderson | - | - | - | - | - | - | - | 2 | 2 |
| = | (New Zealand) Craig Bradshaw | 63 | Van Diemen RF91 | Craig Bradshaw | - | - | - | - | - | - | - | 2 | 2 |
| 31 | (South Korea) Alan Cho | | Van Diemen RF93 | | - | - | - | - | 1 | - | - | - | 1 |
| = | (Australia) Ray Stubber | | Van Diemen RF95 | | - | - | - | - | - | 1 | - | - | 1 |
| = | (Australia) Neil Richardson | 28 | Van Diemen RF90 | Neil Richardson | - | - | - | - | - | - | 1 | - | 1 |
| Pos | Driver | No. | Car | Entrant | (Victoria (state)) SAN | (Tasmania) SYM | (New South Wales) BAT | (Victoria (state)) PHI | (Queensland) LAK | (New South Wales) EAS | (South Australia) MAL | (New South Wales) ORA | Pts |

The "Dunlop Rookie of the Year" award was won by Mal Rose.
