= 1998 FAI 1000 =

Motor race in Australia

Seasons
- ← 1997 1999 →

Layout of the Mount Panorama Circuit

The 1998 FAI 1000 Classic was the second running of the Australia 1000 race, first held after the organisational split over the Bathurst 1000 the previous year. It was the 41st race that traces its lineage back to the 1960 Armstrong 500 held at Phillip Island. 1998 was the 36th year in which a touring car endurance race had been held at the Mount Panorama Circuit.

The event, which was contested by V8 Supercars, was held on 15 November 1998 at the Mount Panorama Circuit just outside Bathurst.

The event's naming rights sponsor was FAI Insurance.

== Entry list ==
No.	Class	Drivers	Team (Sponsor)	Car	No.	Class	Drivers	Team (Sponsor)	Car
1	O	(Australia) Craig Lowndes (Australia) Mark Skaife	Holden Racing Team (Holden, Mobil 1)	Holden Commodore VT	35	O	(Australia) Jason Bargwanna (New Zealand) Jim Richards	Garry Rogers Motorsport (Valvoline, Cummins)	Holden Commodore VS
2	O	(Australia) David Parsons (New Zealand) Simon Wills	Gibson Motorsport (Wynn's)	Holden Commodore VS	36	P	(Australia) Neil Schembri (Australia) Gary Quartly	Schembri Motorsport (Gearbox Motorsport)	Holden Commodore VS
3	P	(Australia) Steve Reed (Australia) Trevor Ashby	Lansvale Smash Repairs (PPG)	Holden Commodore VS	37	O	(Australia) Alan Taylor (Australia) Bill Attard (Australia) Stephen Bell	Alan Taylor Racing (The Xerox Shop)	Holden Commodore VS
4	O	(Australia) Jason Bright (New Zealand) Steven Richards	Stone Brothers Racing (Pirtek)	Ford Falcon EL	38	O	(Australia) Mark Poole (Australia) Tony Scott	James Rosenberg Racing (Gawler Farm Machinery)	Holden Commodore VS
5	O	(Australia) Glenn Seton (Australia) Neil Crompton	Glenn Seton Racing (Ford Credit)	Ford Falcon EL	39	P	(Australia) Chris Smerdon (Australia) Charlie Cox	Challenge Motorsport (Vittoria Coffee)	Holden Commodore VS
7	O	(Australia) Darren Hossack (Australia) Darren Pate	Gibson Motorsport (Wynn's)	Holden Commodore VS	43	O	(Australia) Paul Weel (Australia) Neal Bates	Paul Weel Racing (K&J Thermal Products)	Ford Falcon EL
9	O	(Australia) Alan Jones (Australia) Adam Macrow	Longhurst Racing (Komatsu)	Ford Falcon EL	44	P	(Australia) Mal Rose (Australia) Allan McCarthy	Mal Rose Racing (Ming, Steal Stopper)	Holden Commodore VS
10	O	(Australia) Mark Larkham (Australia) Brad Jones	Larkham Motorsport (Mitre 10)	Ford Falcon EL	45	P	(Australia) Shane Beikoff (Australia) Shane Cruickshank (United Kingdom) Andy Lloyd	Shane Cruickshank Racing (V8 Supercars Board Game, Union Steel)	Holden Commodore VS
11	O	(Australia) Larry Perkins (Australia) Russell Ingall	Perkins Engineering (Castrol)	Holden Commodore VT	46	O	(New Zealand) John Faulkner (Australia) Todd Kelly	John Faulkner Racing (Betta Electrical, Fisher & Paykel)	Holden Commodore VS
14	P	(Australia) Mike Imrie (Australia) Rodney Crick	Imrie Motorsport (Armor All, Saabwreck)	Holden Commodore VS	48	P	(Australia) D'Arcy Russell (Australia) Rod Wilson	Rod Smith Racing (Playboy)	Holden Commodore VS
16	O	(Australia) Melinda Price (Australia) Kerryn Brewer	Perkins Engineering (Castrol)	Holden Commodore VS	49	O	(Australia) Greg Crick (Australia) Dean Crosswell	Greg Crick Motorsport (Ericsson, Trust Bank)	Holden Commodore VS
17	O	(Australia) Dick Johnson (Australia) Steven Johnson	Dick Johnson Racing (Shell Helix)	Ford Falcon EL	50	O	(New Zealand) Greg Murphy (Australia) Mark Noske	Holden Racing Team (Holden, Mobil 1)	Holden Commodore VT
18	O	(Australia) John Bowe (Australia) Cameron McConville	Dick Johnson Racing (Shell Helix)	Ford Falcon EL	54	P	(Australia) Simon Emerzidis (Australia) Garry Willmington	Emerzidis Motorsport (Simon's Earthworks)	Ford Falcon EL
20	P	(Australia) Darren Palmer (Australia) Ian Palmer (Australia) Domenic Beninca	Palmer Promotions (Hippies Underwear)	Holden Commodore VS	55	P	(Australia) Rod Nash (Australia) Darren Edwards	Rod Nash Racing (Autopro, Budweiser)	Holden Commodore VS
22	O	(Australia) Danny Osborne (Australia) Brett Peters	Colourscan Motorsport (Colourscan Printing)	Ford Falcon EL	60	P	(Australia) Nathan Pretty (Australia) Nicole Pretty (Australia) Grant Johnson	Pretty Motorsport (DeWalt)	Holden Commodore VS
23	P	(Australia) Ray Hislop (Australia) Tim Briggs	Ray Hislop Racing (NHP Electrical Engineering)	Ford Falcon EF	72	P	(Australia) Robert Smith (Australia) David Parsons	Robert Smith Racing (Smith's Truck Sales)	Holden Commodore VS
24	O	(Australia) Paul Romano (Australia) Steven Ellery	Romano Racing (Siemens Mobile)	Holden Commodore VS	75	O	(Australia) Anthony Tratt (Australia) Bob Jones	Paul Little Racing (Toll)	Ford Falcon EL
25	O	(Australia) Tony Longhurst (Australia) Geoff Brabham	Longhurst Racing (Castrol)	Ford Falcon EL	77	P	(Australia) Richard Mork (Australia) Bill Sieders	V8 Racing (v8racing.com, CareFlight)	Holden Commodore VR
26	P	(Australia) Peter Doulman (Australia) John Cotter	Doulman Automotive (Gatorade)	Holden Commodore VS	79	P	(Australia) Mike Conway (Australia) Chris Hones	Conway Racing (OAMPS Insurance)	Ford Falcon EL
27	O	(Australia) Terry Finnigan (Australia) Peter Gazzard	Terry Finnigan Racing Team (Sony)	Holden Commodore VS	96	O	(Australia) Wayne Gardner (Australia) Paul Stokell	Wayne Gardner Racing (Coca-Cola, Donut King)	Holden Commodore VS
28	O	(Australia) Mark McLaughlin (New Zealand) Ashley Stichbury (Australia) Kevin Waldock	Playscape Racing (CBS Drill and Blast)	Ford Falcon EF	99	P	(Australia) Mick Donaher (Australia) Dean Lindstrom	Clive Wiseman Racing (Ultra Tune)	Holden Commodore VS
32	O	(Australia) Tomas Mezera (Switzerland) Alain Menu	Tomas Mezera Motorsport (Densitron)	Holden Commodore VT	134	P	(Australia) Alan Heath (Australia) Ken Douglas	Power Racing (West Terrace 4x4)	Ford Falcon EL
34	O	(Australia) Garth Tander (Australia) Cameron McLean	Garry Rogers Motorsport (Valvoline, Cummins)	Holden Commodore VS					

Icon	Class
O	Outright
P	Privateers

== Results ==
=== Top 10 shootout ===
Pos	No	Driver	Team	Car	Time
1	1	(Australia) Mark Skaife	Holden Racing Team	Holden VT Commodore	2:09.8945
2	25	(Australia) Tony Longhurst	Longhurst Racing	Ford EL Falcon	2:10.4492
3	5	(Australia) Glenn Seton	Glenn Seton Racing	Ford EL Falcon	2:10.8801
4	10	(Australia) Mark Larkham	Larkham Motor Sport	Ford EL Falcon	2:10.9059
5	46	(New Zealand) John Faulkner	John Faulkner Racing	Holden VS Commodore	2:12.2551
6	18	(Australia) John Bowe	Dick Johnson Racing	Ford EL Falcon	2:12.3975
7	96	(Australia) Wayne Gardner	Wayne Gardner Racing	Holden VS Commodore	2:12.9215
8	35	(Australia) Jason Bargwanna	Garry Rogers Motorsport	Holden VS Commodore	2:12.9773
9	11	(Australia) Larry Perkins	Perkins Engineering	Holden VT Commodore	2:13.0273
DNS	50	(New Zealand) Greg Murphy	Holden Racing Team	Holden VT Commodore	

* Mark Skaife became the first driver to lap a touring car around the 6.213 km (3.861 mi) Mount Panorama Circuit in under 2 minutes and 10 seconds. Skaife qualified his Holden Racing Team VT Commodore in 2:09.8945. His time was 2.93 seconds faster than his own time set in the twin-turbo, 4WD Nissan Skyline R32 GT-R in 1991, the fastest Group A time on The Mountain, and 3.96 seconds faster than George Fury's, Group C time in 1984 in a Nissan Bluebird Turbo on the old 6.172 km (3.835 mi) (pre-Caltex Chase) circuit.
* Greg Murphy did not take part in the Top 10 shootout after badly damaging his car in a crash during Friday practice.

=== Race ===
Pos	Class	No	Drivers	Team	Car	Laps	Time/Retired	Grid
1	OC	4	(Australia) Jason Bright (New Zealand) Steven Richards	Stone Brothers Racing	Ford EL Falcon	161	6:42:23.9039	15
2	OC	11	(Australia) Larry Perkins (Australia) Russell Ingall	Perkins Engineering	Holden VT Commodore	161	+10.3162	9
3	OC	35	(Australia) Jason Bargwanna (New Zealand) Jim Richards	Garry Rogers Motorsport	Holden VS Commodore	161	+10.6552	8
4	OC	10	(Australia) Mark Larkham (Australia) Brad Jones	Larkham Motor Sport	Ford EL Falcon	161	+1:43.4170	4
5	OC	5	(Australia) Glenn Seton (Australia) Neil Crompton	Glenn Seton Racing	Ford EL Falcon	160	+1 lap	3
6	OC	1	(Australia) Craig Lowndes (Australia) Mark Skaife	Holden Racing Team	Holden VT Commodore	159	+2 laps	1
7	OC	7	(Australia) Darren Hossack (Australia) Darren Pate	Gibson Motorsport	Holden VS Commodore	158	+3 laps	20
8	OC	25	(Australia) Tony Longhurst (Australia) Geoff Brabham	Longhurst Racing	Ford EL Falcon	157	+4 laps	2
9	OC	43	(Australia) Paul Weel (Australia) Neal Bates	Paul Weel Racing	Ford EL Falcon	155	+6 laps	22
10	CT	44	(Australia) Mal Rose (Australia) Allan McCarthy	Mal Rose Racing	Holden VS Commodore	154	+7 laps	27
11	OC	16	(Australia) Melinda Price (Australia) Kerryn Brewer	Perkins Engineering	Holden VS Commodore	151	+10 laps	33
12	OC	24	(Australia) Paul Romano (Australia) Steven Ellery	Romano Racing	Holden VS Commodore	151	+10 laps	17
13	OC	96	(Australia) Wayne Gardner (Australia) Paul Stokell	Wayne Gardner Racing	Holden VS Commodore	149	+12 laps	7
14	CT	23	(Australia) Ray Hislop (Australia) Tim Briggs	Briggs Motor Sport	Ford EL Falcon	147	+14 laps	36
15	OC	37	(Australia) Alan Taylor (Australia) Bill Attard (Australia) Stephen Bell	Scotty Taylor Racing	Holden VS Commodore	146	+15 laps	42
16	CT	48	(Australia) D'arcy Russell (Australia) Rod Wilson	Rod Smith Racing	Holden VS Commodore	144	+17 laps	41
17	CT	79	(Australia) Mike Conway (Australia) Chris Hones	Cadillac Productions	Ford EL Falcon	144	+17 laps	32
18	CT	26	(Australia) Peter Doulman (Australia) John Cotter	Doulman Automotive	Holden VS Commodore	141	+20 laps	24
19	CT	45	(Australia) Shane Beikoff (Australia) Shane Cruickshank (United Kingdom) Andy Lloyd	Shane Cruickshank	Holden VS Commodore	134	+27 laps	44
20	CT	14	(Australia) Mike Imrie (Australia) Rodney Crick	Imrie Motorsport	Holden VS Commodore	122	+39 laps	29
DNF	OC	27	(Australia) Terry Finnigan (Australia) Peter Gazzard	Terry Finnigan	Holden VS Commodore	136	Engine	14
DNF	OC	46	(New Zealand) John Faulkner (Australia) Todd Kelly	John Faulkner Racing	Holden VS Commodore	136	Engine	5
DNF	CT	3	(Australia) Steve Reed (Australia) Trevor Ashby	Lansvale Smash Repairs	Holden VS Commodore	131	Electrical	23
DNF	CT	20	(Australia) Ian Palmer (Australia) Domenic Beninca (Australia) Darren Palmer	Palmer Promotions	Holden VS Commodore	121	Crash	38
DNF	OC	22	(Australia) Danny Osborne (Australia) Brett Peters	Colourscan Racing	Ford EL Falcon	115	Diff failure	31
DNF	CT	54	(Australia) Simon Emerzidis (Australia) Garry Willmington	Emerzidis Motorsport	Ford EL Falcon	101	Engine	26
DNF	CT	36	(Australia) Neil Schembri (Australia) Gary Quartly	Schembri Motorsport	Holden VS Commodore	100	Engine	40
DNF	OC	50	(New Zealand) Greg Murphy (Australia) Mark Noske	Holden Racing Team	Holden VT Commodore	86	Tyre failures	10
DNF	CT	60	(Australia) Nathan Pretty (Australia) Grant Johnson (Australia) Nicole Pretty	Pretty Motorsport	Holden VS Commodore	85	Alternator	39
DNF	OC	18	(Australia) John Bowe (Australia) Cameron McConville	Dick Johnson Racing	Ford EL Falcon	80	Engine	6
DNF	OC	17	(Australia) Dick Johnson (Australia) Steven Johnson	Dick Johnson Racing	Ford EL Falcon	60	Crash	12
DNF	CT	39	(Australia) Chris Smerdon (Australia) Charlie Cox	Challenge Motorsport	Holden VS Commodore	60	Tailshaft	30
DNF	OC	9	(Australia) Alan Jones (Australia) Adam Macrow	Longhurst Racing	Ford EL Falcon	58	Crash	11
DNF	OC	2	(Australia) David Parsons (New Zealand) Simon Wills	Gibson Motorsport	Holden VS Commodore	57	Crash	18
DNF	CT	72	(Australia) Robert Smith (Australia) David Parsons	Robert Smith Racing	Holden VS Commodore	56	Crash	28
DNF	CT	134	(Australia) Alan Heath (Australia) Ken Douglas	Power Racing	Ford EL Falcon	54	Crash	34
DNF	OC	34	(Australia) Garth Tander (Australia) Cameron McLean	Garry Rogers Motorsport	Holden VS Commodore	49	Suspension	13
DNF	CT	77	(Australia) Richard Mork (Australia) Bill Sieders	V8 Racing	Holden VR Commodore	48	Engine	45
DNF	OC	75	(Australia) Anthony Tratt (Australia) Bob Jones (Australia) Garry Waldon	Paul Little Racing	Ford EL Falcon	47	Engine	25
DNF	OC	28	(Australia) Mark McLaughlin (New Zealand) Ashley Stichbury (Australia) Kevin Waldock	Playscape Racing	Ford EL Falcon	40	Electrical	35
DNF	OC	38	(Australia) Mark Poole (Australia) Tony Scott	James Rosenberg Racing	Holden VS Commodore	34	Engine	21
DNF	CT	55	(Australia) Rod Nash (Australia) Darren Edwards	Rod Nash Racing	Holden VS Commodore	9	Tailshaft	43
DNF	OC	32	(Australia) Tomas Mezera (Switzerland) Alain Menu	Tomas Mezera Motorsport	Holden VT Commodore	0	Clutch	19
DSQ	OC	49	(Australia) Greg Crick (Australia) Dean Crosswell	Greg Crick Motorsport	Holden VS Commodore	151	Excluded	17
DNS	CT	99	(Australia) Mick Donaher (Australia) Dean Lindstrom	Clive Wiseman Racing	Holden VS Commodore		Engine failure on warm-up lap	37

== Broadcast ==
Network 10 broadcast the race for the second consecutive year, dating back to the 1997 5.0L race. Barry Sheene provided commentary in the booth for the first part of the race before moving to pit-lane for the remainder. Greg Rust was involved in the Bathurst broadcast for the first time.

Network 10
Hosts: Bill Woods, Matthew White
Booth: Leigh Diffey, Mark Oastler, Barry Sheene
Pit-lane: Greg Rust

== Statistics ==
- Provisional position - #5 Glenn Seton - 2:11.4634
- Pole position - #1 Mark Skaife - 2:09.8945
- Fastest lap - #1 Craig Lowndes - 2:12.7771
- Average speed - 149 km/h
