= Jason Bright =

Australian racing driver

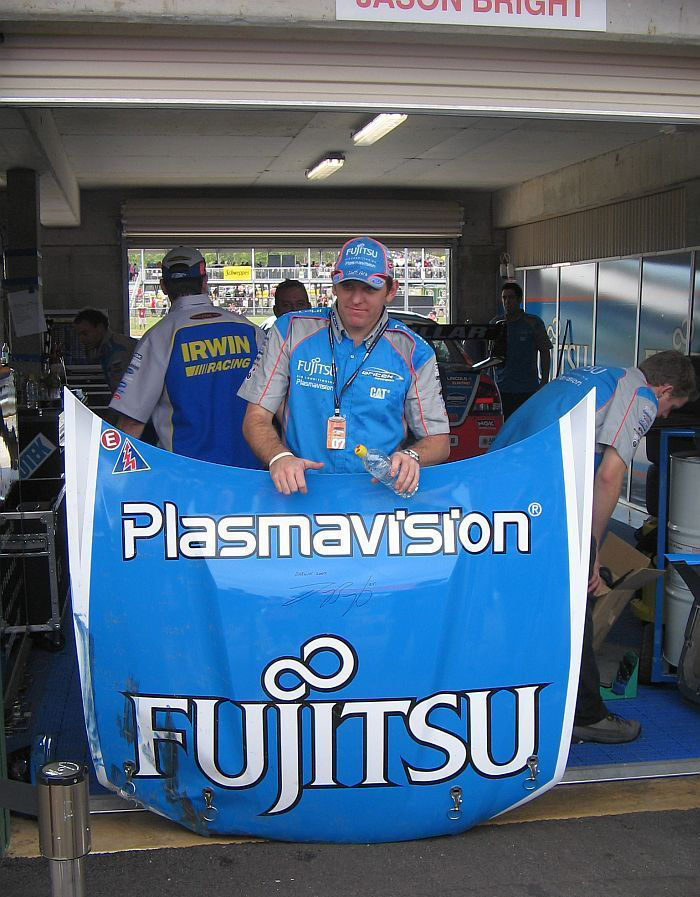
- Jason Bright at Hidden Valley in 2007
- Nationality: Australian
- Born: Jason Paul Bright; 7 March 1973 (age 53) Moe, Victoria, Australia
- Categorisation: FIA Platinum

Supercars Championship career
- Championships: 0
- Races: 578
- Wins: 20
- Podiums: 88
- Pole positions: 17

24 Hours of Le Mans career
- Years: 2013
- Teams: 8 Star Motorsports
- Best finish: 38th
- Class wins: 0

Jason Paul Bright (born 7 March 1973) is a retired Australian racing driver who competed in the Virgin Australia Supercars Championship. He drove the No. 56 Ford FG X Falcon for Britek Motorsport, a satellite team of Prodrive Racing Australia, before retiring from full-time racing at the end of the 2017 season.

== Racing career ==
=== Australia ===
Bright started his motor racing career at the age of 15 in 1988 and won the Junior Club Championship at the Gippsland Go-Kart Club. One year later, Bright won the Senior Club Championships.

In 1990, Bright was the runner-up in the Victorian Go Karting Championship and he went on to win the championship in 1991.

1992 saw Bright move into single-seaters and into the Victorian Formula Ford Championship and finished fourth and dovetailed this with another go-kart campaign, finishing third overall in Australia.

Bright made his debut in the Australian Formula Ford Championship in 1993, in a factory-backed Spectrum. In the season, he had a best finish of sixth at Symmons Plains, but in the Australian Formula Ford Festival at Winton, he finished second. Bright finished third in the 1994 Australian Formula Ford Championship, behind Steven Richards and Gavin Monaghan. He won the Formula Ford race supporting the Australian Grand Prix.

1995 was a fantastic season for Bright, winning the Australian Formula Ford Championship, winning the Australian Grand Prix support race and the Lexmark Indy 300 support race. He was also nominated for two major Australian awards.

Bright finished runner-up in the 1996 Australian Drivers' Championship behind Paul Stokell, winning three races. But in 1997, Bright dominated that championship, winning seven races and made his V8 Supercar debut at Symmons Plains, finishing ninth, but better was to come as he finished third in the Sandown 500 with Alan Jones but failed to capitalise at Bathurst a few weeks later, finishing eleventh.

In 1998, Bright became a full-time touring car driver, joining Stone Brothers Racing, showing considerable promise with several top six performances and a third place at Calder Park. He and co-driver Steven Richards won the Bathurst Classic (the V8Supercar version of the Bathurst 1000 that year) coming back after Bright crashed heavily in practice and only being able to record a single flying lap in qualifying because of the extensive repairs.

In 1999, Bright had six podiums, including a win at Hidden Valley Raceway and three pole positions. He also took part in the sportscar race at Adelaide to bring in 2000 and finished third in class.

2001 saw Bright return to the V8 Supercar series after a stint in Champ Car competition (see below), with the multi-championship-winning Holden Racing Team. Bright won the season-opening Clipsal 500 and led for most of the first half of the season before fading to third. 2002 was another good season at HRT, with two wins and a pole.

2003 saw Bright move to Paul Weel Racing and consistency was the key to get him fourth in the standings. 2004 saw Bright win three races finishing third in the championship. Bright also won the 2003 Bathurst 24 Hour race in a Holden Monaro driving with the late Peter Brock, Greg Murphy and Todd Kelly. This car was run by rival V8 Supercar team Garry Rogers Motorsport.

Bright crossed marques in 2005 when he moved to Ford Performance Racing. Bright finished ninth overall for FPR.

Bright had an awful start to the 2006 season, finishing 15th and 25th in Adelaide. However he improved throughout the season, ending with a win at the Sandown 500 and the inaugural Desert 400 at the Bahrain International Circuit as well as podiums at Surfers Paradise and Symmons Plains.

For 2007, Bright left FPR to join his struggling Britek Motorsport team and battled in the midfield. After two seasons with funds tightening, Bright leased out one of his two Racing Entitlement Contracts and focussed on just one car. Further to the team cutbacks, Bright came to an arrangement with Stone Brothers Racing to do vehicle preparation and but most of his team equipment and workshop on the market, effectively shutting down Britek as a racing team. His form gradually improved at SBR and jumped forward when his older Britek BF Falcon was replaced with a SBR FG Falcon picking up a third at the Sydney 500 and leading the race, but by this stage Bright's major sponsor Fujitsu had announced they would be leaving the team.

Brad Jones Racing team owner, Kim Jones confirmed that Bright would be joining the team for the 2010 season.

Bright confirmed that he would re-join Prodrive Racing Australia after leaving BJR for the 2017 Supercars Championship season, just 10 years after he left the team for Britek Motorsports, making him the fourth driver in the team.

=== Overseas ===
Bright's first taste of international competition was in 1996, a hectic year in which he raced in both the United States and Australia. He won two races in the US Formula Ford 2000 Championship, at St. Petersburg and Mosport, finished second in the championship behind Steve Knapp and was awarded Rookie of the Year.

In 2000, Bright left Australia to join the Indy Lights series in America, where with race engineer Gerald Tyler, had five podium finishes and finished sixth in the standings. He also made his Champ Car debut at the Lexmark Indy 300 that year.

In 2006, Bright drove for Prodrive in an Aston Martin at the Sebring 12 Hour finishing fourth. 2013 he made his debut at the Le mans 24 Hour race driving for 8 Star Motorsports. They finished 10th in class.

== Britek Motorsport ==
Bright established his own V8 Supercar team, Britek Motorsport, in 2005. He was driving for Ford Performance Racing at the time and thus his team had restrictions on testing and driver licensing. The team is officially referred to as Fujitsu Racing, after their marquee sponsor. Bright joined his own team in 2007. He nearly won the 2007 Bathurst 1000 but a bad tyre call in the pits left him hitting the wall at McPhillamy Park with 10 laps to go.

Britek also briefly ran Ford Australias entry in the Australian Rally Championship, a pair of Super 2000 Ford Fiestas for Michael Guest and Darren Windus.

The team wound down after the 2008 season. The team's franchises remained live in 2009 with one leased out and Bright running the other as a Stone Brothers Racing customer team. At the end of 2009, the leased franchise was sold off to Brad Jones Racing.

== Brad Jones Racing ==
For the 2010 season, Bright drove a Holden VE Commodore for Brad Jones Racing.

Bright's 2010 season was rather inconsistent, but a couple of good qualifying performances at the back half of the year, a fourth place at the 2010 Bathurst 1000, and a podium finish at Symmons Plains, finishing behind Paul Dumbrell and Mark Winterbottom led to an overall result of 14th place in the championship. Race 8 in Perth saw Bright win Brad Jones Racing its first-ever V8 Supercars win. Bright followed this up with a win at Winton and was amongst the favourites to win the championship with a high of fourth in the championship standings. However, Bright's 2011 season faded away. Later in the season, Bright injured his ribs and missed three events as a result. His 2012 season was rather inconsistent, finishing 16th – for the second year in a row.

In 2013, with the introduction of the Car Of The Future rules, Brad Jones Racing saw a dramatic change in performance in both Bright and teammate Fabian Coulthard. Using the new Holden VF Commodore, the team saw back-to-back wins at Tasmania, with Bright winning his first race since Winton 2011. Bright then went on to win Race 4 at Pukekohe Raceway, which awarded him the inaugural Jason Richards Memorial Trophy, for scoring the most points over the weekend; his famous celebration ended up in him busting a fluorescent light while jumping for joy. Bright's form thus far has been rather consistent, landing him with enough points to make the top-ten in the 2013 championship. A stroke of bad luck, however, saw Bright not being able to compete in Race 1 at Gold Coast, after Andrew Jones severely damaged the car during practice. However, they did manage to repair the car to such an extent that they competed in Race 2, where they managed to place 15th. Bright finished the 2013 Championship season in 7th place, one place below teammate Fabian Coulthard.

Bright had a disastrous start to 2014, with a monumental crash in Race 3 at the Clipsal 500 giving him his first and only DNF for the season. Since then, Bright has been rather inconsistent, with only one podium finish; a win at the Auckland 500.

== Career results ==
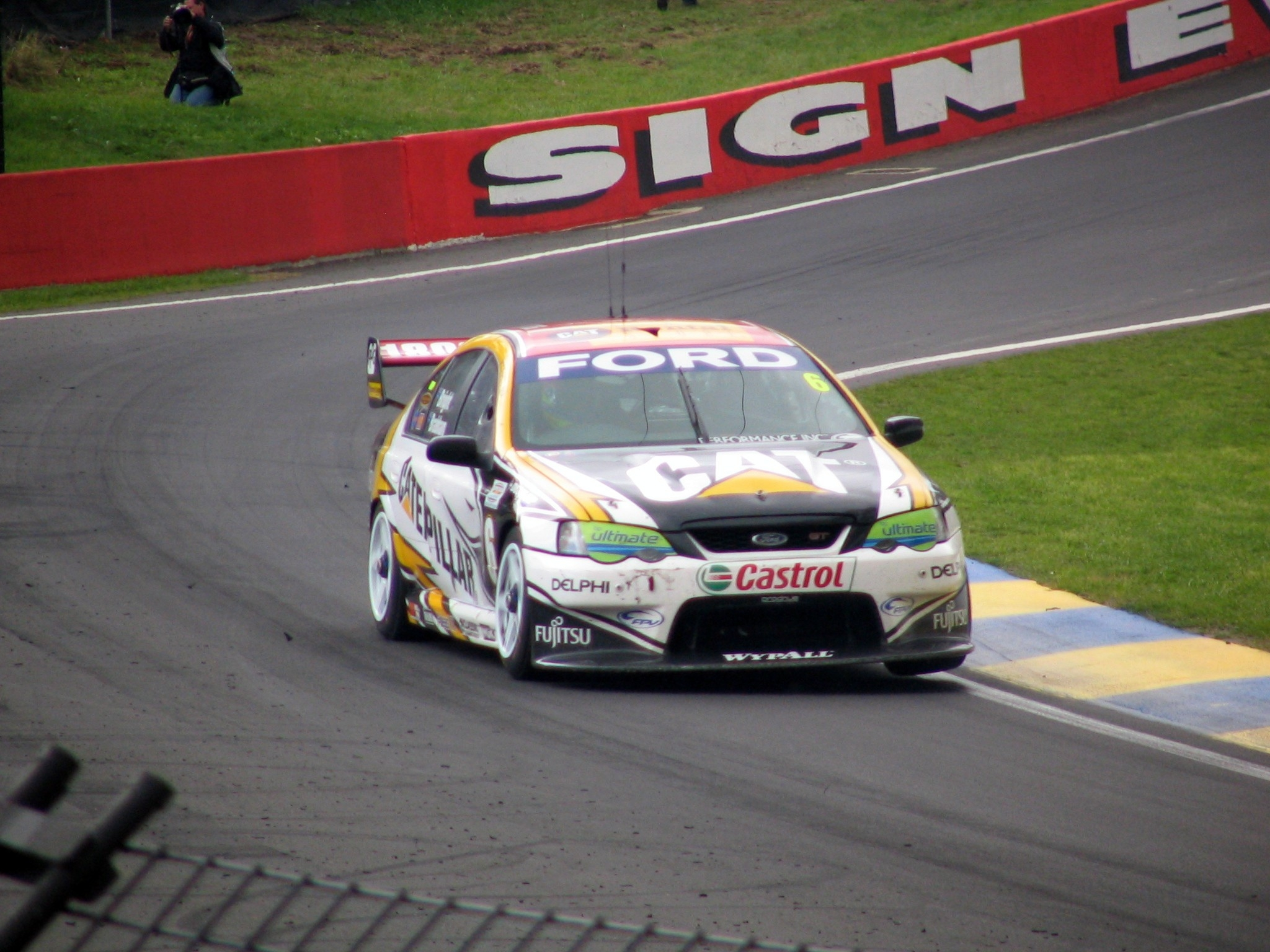
The Ford Performance Racing entered Ford BA Falcon of Jason Bright and David Brabham at the 2005 Super Cheap Auto 1000

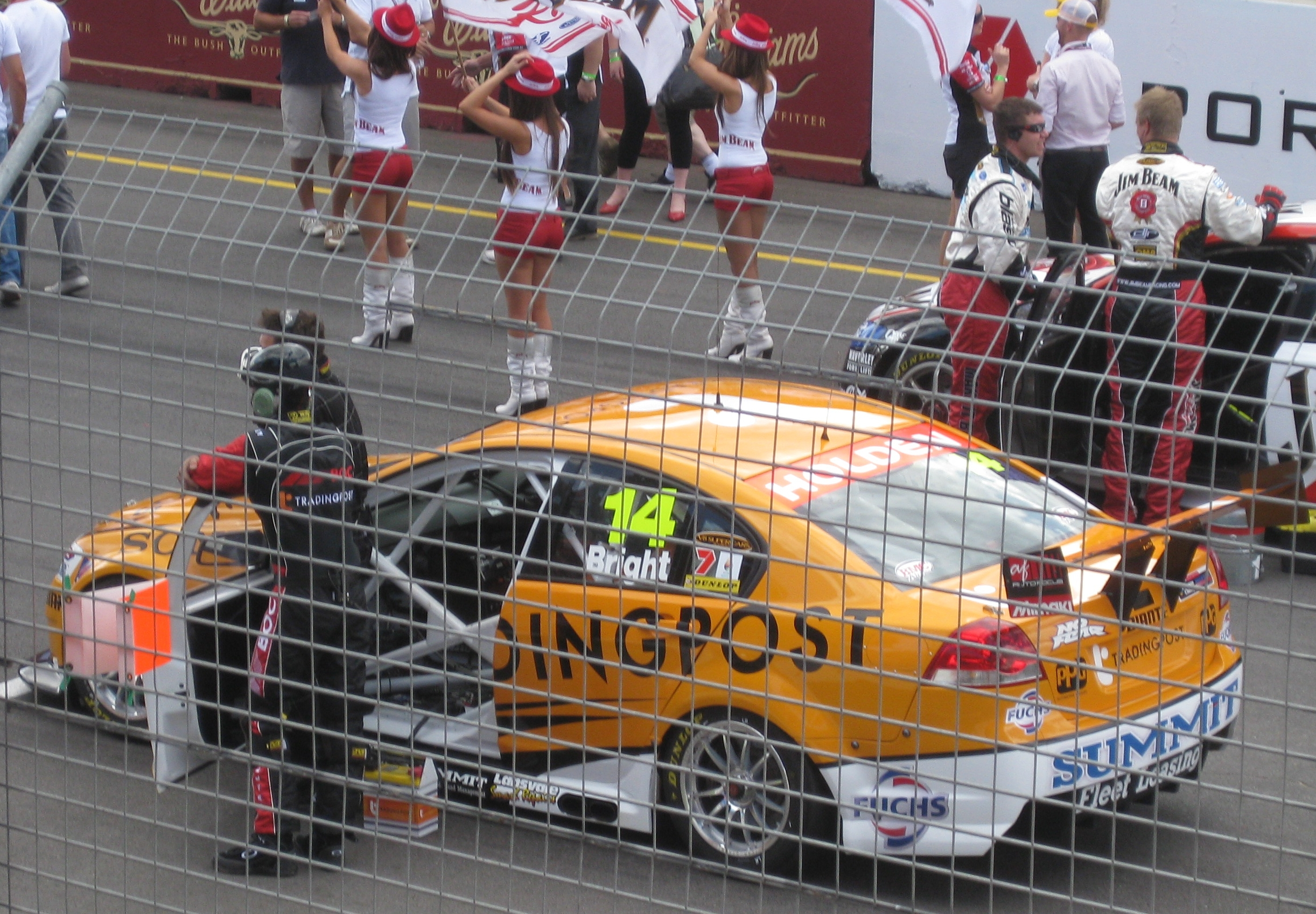
The Brad Jones Racing entered Holden VE Commodore of Jason Bright at the 2010 Clipsal 500 Adelaide

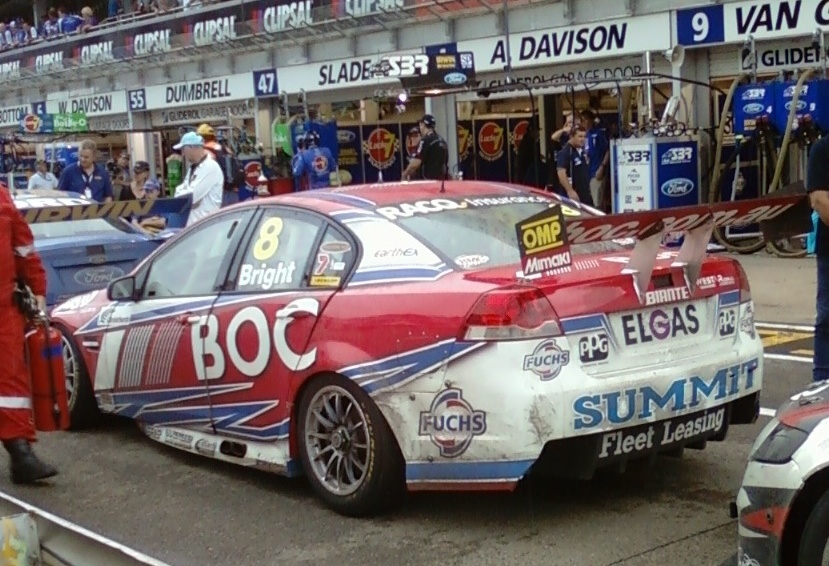
The Brad Jones Racing entered Holden VE Commodore of Jason Bright at the 2011 Clipsal 500 Adelaide

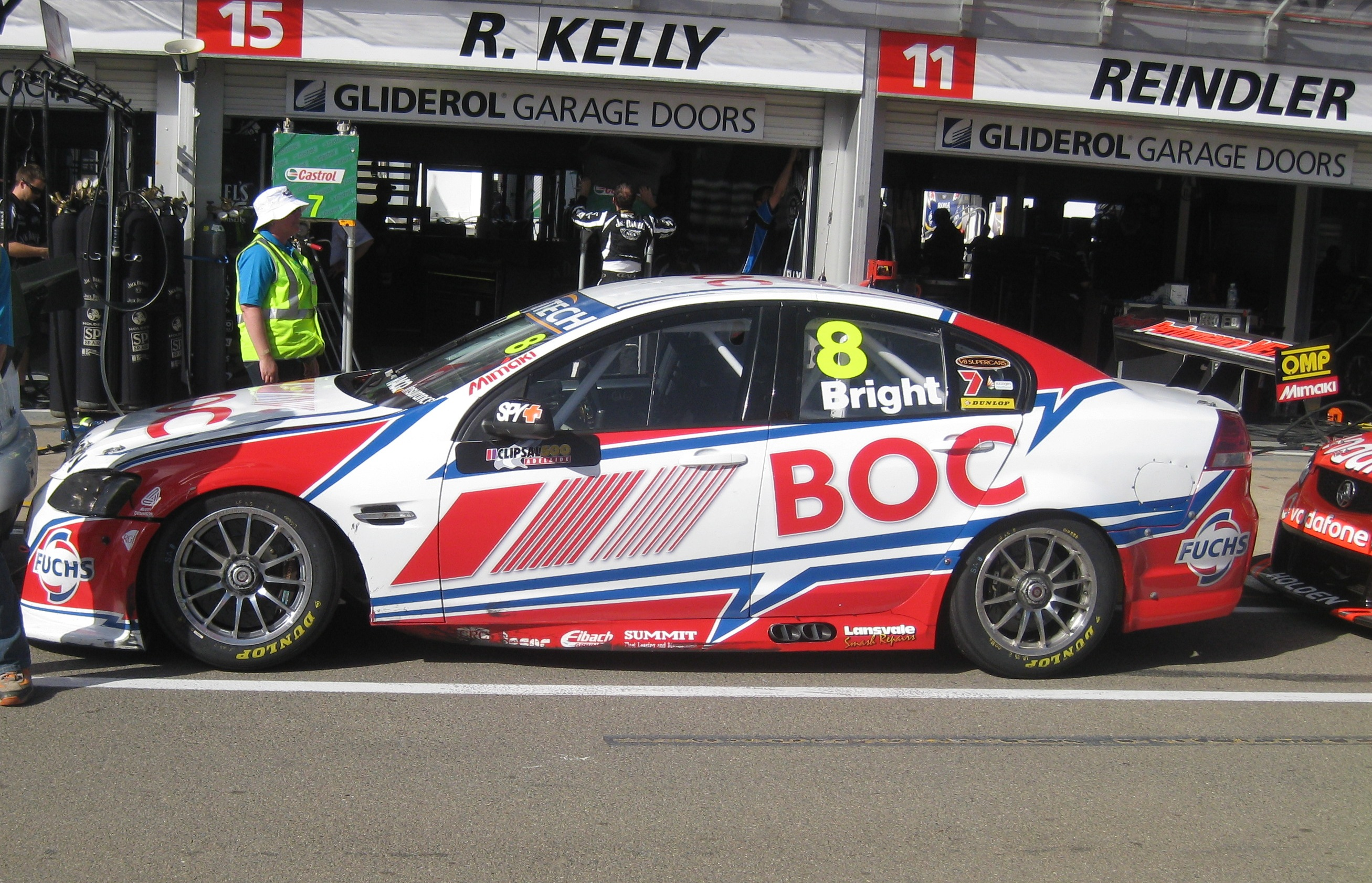
The Brad Jones Racing entered Holden VE Commodore of Jason Bright at the 2012 Clipsal 500 Adelaide

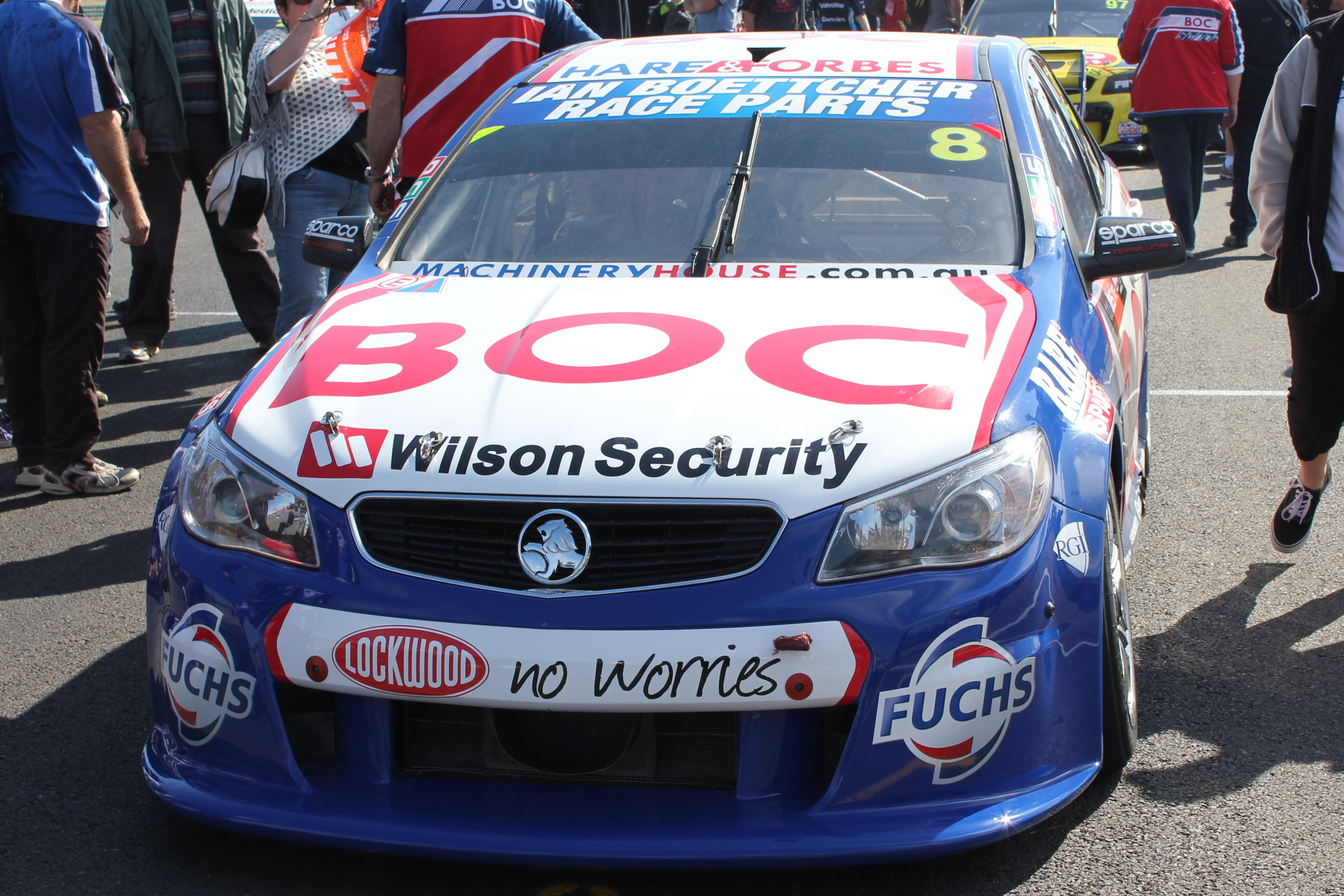
The Brad Jones Racing entered Holden VF Commodore of Jason Bright at the 2014 Coates Hire Ipswich 400

=== Karting career summary ===
Season	Series	Position
1989	Gippsland Karting Club Championship - Junior	**1st**
1990	Gippsland Karting Club Championship - Senior	**1st**
1990	Victorian Karting Championship	**2nd**
1991	Victorian Karting Championship	**1st**
2011	All-Star Series - KZ2	13th
Source 12

=== Circuit career results ===
Season	Series	Position	Car	Team
1992	Victorian Formula Ford Championship	**1st**	Spectrum 05 – Ford	
1993	Australian Formula Ford Championship	17th	Spectrum 05 Ford	Borland Racing Developments
1994	Australian Formula Ford Championship	**3rd**	Swift SC93F – Ford	Jason Bright
1995	Australian Formula Ford Championship	**1st**	Van Diemen RF95 – Ford	Valvoline Australia
1996	United States Formula Ford 2000	**2nd**	Van Diemen RF96 – Ford	Van Diemen USA
1996	Western States Triple Crown	**1st**	Van Diemen RF96 – Ford	Van Diemen USA
1996	Australian Drivers' Championship	**2nd**	Reynard 91D – Holden	Birrana Racing
1997	Australian Drivers' Championship	**1st**	Reynard 91D Holden	Birrana Racing
1997	Australian Touring Car Championship	21st	Holden VS Commodore	Garry Rogers Motorsport
1998	Australian Touring Car Championship	9th	Ford EL Falcon	Stone Brothers Racing
1999	Shell Championship Series	8th	Ford AU Falcon	Stone Brothers Racing
2000	Indy Lights	6th	Lola B2K/20 – Buick	Doricott Racing
2000	Champcar World Series	31st	Reynard 2Ki – Toyota	Della-Penna Racing
2000	Shell Championship Series	26th	Ford AU Falcon	Dick Johnson Racing
2000	American Le Mans Series	36th	Panoz LMP-1 Roadster-S	Panoz Motor Sports
2001	Shell Championship Series	**3rd**	Holden VX Commodore	Holden Racing Team
2002	V8 Supercar Championship Series	4th	Holden VX Commodore	Holden Racing Team
2003	V8 Supercar Championship Series	4th	Holden VX Commodore	Paul Weel Racing
2004	V8 Supercar Championship Series	**3rd**	Holden VY Commodore	Paul Weel Racing
2005	V8 Supercar Championship Series	9th	Ford BA Falcon	Ford Performance Racing
2006	V8 Supercar Championship Series	5th	Ford BA Falcon	Ford Performance Racing
2006	American Le Mans Series-GT1 Class	11th	Aston Martin DBR9	Prodrive
2007	V8 Supercar Championship Series	21st	Ford BF Falcon	Britek Motorsport
2008	V8 Supercar Championship Series	19th	Ford BF Falcon	Britek Motorsport
2009	V8 Supercar Championship Series	19th	Ford BF Falcon; Ford FG Falcon	Britek Motorsport
2010	V8 Supercar Championship Series	14th	Holden VE Commodore	Brad Jones Racing
2011	International V8 Supercars Championship	16th	Holden VE Commodore	Brad Jones Racing
2011	Australian Production Car Championship	25th	HSV VXR	Racer Industries
2012	International V8 Supercars Championship	16th	Holden VE Commodore	Brad Jones Racing
2013	International V8 Supercars Championship	7th	Holden VF Commodore	Brad Jones Racing
2014	International V8 Supercars Championship	11th	Holden VF Commodore	Brad Jones Racing
2015	International V8 Supercars Championship	16th	Holden VF Commodore	Brad Jones Racing
2016	International V8 Supercars Championship	17th	Holden VF Commodore	Brad Jones Racing
2017	Virgin Australia Supercars Championship	20th	Ford FG X Falcon	Britek Motorsport
2018	Virgin Australia Supercars Championship	48th	Holden ZB Commodore	Team 18
2019	TCR Australia	7th	Volkswagen Golf GTI TCR	Melbourne Performance Centre

=== Complete Supercars Championship results ===
(key) (Races in bold indicate pole position) (Races in italics indicate fastest lap)(Someone please fill in Brights results from 2012, 2013, 2014, 2015, 2016,)

Year	Team	No.	Car	1	2	3	4	5	6	7	8	9	10	11	12	13	14	15	16	17	18	19	20	21	22	23	24	25	26	27	28	29	30	31	32	33	34	35	36	37	38	39	DC	Points
1997	Garry Rogers Motorsport	34	Holden VS Commodore	CAL; R1	CAL; R2	CAL; R3	PHI; R4	PHI; R5	PHI; R6	SAN; R7	SAN; R8	SAN; R9	SYM; R10; 9	SYM; R11; 9	SYM; R12; Ret	WIN; R13	WIN; R14	WIN; R15	EAS; R16	EAS; R17	EAS; R18	LAK; R19	LAK; R20	LAK; R21	BAR; R22	BAR; R23	BAR; R24	MAL; R25	MAL; R26	MAL; R27	ORA; R28	ORA; R29	ORA; R30										21st	24
1998	Stone Brothers Racing	4	Ford EL Falcon	SAN; R1; 10	SAN; R2; Ret	SAN; R3; Ret	SYM; R4; 7	SYM; R5; 5	SYM; R6; 4	LAK; R7; 4	LAK; R8; 7	LAK; R9; 6	PHI; R10; 5	PHI; R11; 6	PHI; R12; 7	WIN; R13; 8	WIN; R14; 9	WIN; R15; 7	MAL; R16; 9	MAL; R17; 5	MAL; R18; 5	BAR; R19; 8	BAR; R20; 4	BAR; R21; Ret	CAL; R22; 3	CAL; R23; 3	CAL; R24; C	**HID**; **R25**; **DSQ**	HDV; R26; Ret	HDV; R27; Ret	ORA; R28; 3	ORA; R29; Ret	ORA; R30; 13										9th	584
1999	Stone Brothers Racing	4	Ford AU Falcon	EAS; R1; 2	EAS; R2; 6	EAS; R3; 30	**ADE**; **R4**; **8**	ADE; R5; 3	BAR; R6; 4	BAR; R7; 3	BAR; R8; 6	PHI; R9; 14	PHI; R10; 14	PHI; R11; 8	HDV; R12; 4	HDV; R13; 2	HDV; R14; 1	SAN; R15; 5	SAN; R16; 6	SAN; R16; 5	QLD; R18; 6	QLD; R19; 6	QLD; R20; 4	**CAL**; **R21**; **3**	CAL; R22; Ret	CAL; R23; DNS	SYM; R24; 5	SYM; R25; Ret	SYM; R26; 14	WIN; R27; 2	WIN; R28; 2	WIN; R29; 4	ORA; R30; 3	ORA; R31; 3	ORA; R32; 3	QLD; R33; Ret	BAT; R34; Ret						8th	1276
2000	Dick Johnson Racing	18	Ford AU Falcon	PHI; R1	PHI; R2	BAR; R3	BAR; R4	BAR; R5	ADE; R6	ADE; R7	EAS; R8	EAS; R9	EAS; R10	HDV; R11	HDV; R12	HDV; R13	CAN; R14	CAN; R15	CAN; R16	QLD; R17	QLD; R18	QLD; R19	WIN; R20	WIN; R21	WIN; R22	ORA; R23	ORA; R24	ORA; R25	CAL; R26	CAL; R27	CAL; R28	QLD; R29	SAN; R30	SAN; R31	SAN; R32	BAT; R33; 2							26th	216
2001	Holden Racing Team	2	Holden VX Commodore	PHI; R1; 2	PHI; R2; 4	ADE; R3; 7	ADE; R4; 1	EAS; R5; 3	EAS; R6; 2	HDV; R7; 5	HDV; R8; 2	HDV; R9; 2	CAN; R10; 11	CAN; R11; 14	CAN; R12; 4	BAR; R13; 10	BAR; R14; 8	BAR; R15; 7	CAL; R16; 6	CAL; R17; 3	CAL; R18; 5	ORA; R19; 7	ORA; R20; 3	QLD; R21; 4	WIN; R22; 4	WIN; R23; 4	BAT; R24; Ret	PUK; R25; 20	PUK; R26; 4	PUK; R27; 2	SAN; R28; 5	SAN; R29; 11	SAN; R30; 4										3rd	2819
2002	Holden Racing Team	2	Holden VX Commodore	ADE; R1; Ret	ADE; R2; 5	PHI; R3; 4	PHI; R4; 9	EAS; R5; Ret	EAS; R6; 13	EAS; R7; 7	**HDV**; **R8**; **1**	**HDV**; **R9**; **2**	HDV; R10; 2	CAN; R11; 16	CAN; R12; 2	CAN; R13; 18	BAR; R14; 2	BAR; R15; 2	BAR; R16; 1	ORA; R17; 2	ORA; R18; 3	WIN; R19; 1	**WIN**; **R20**; **1**	QLD; R21; Ret	BAT; R22; 3	SUR; R23; 6	SUR; R24; 11	PUK; R25; 4	PUK; R26; 2	PUK; R27; Ret	SAN; R28; Ret	SAN; R29; 4											4th	1459
2003	Paul Weel Racing	50	Holden VX Commodore	**ADE**; **R1**; **3**	ADE; R1; 6	PHI; R3; 2	EAS; R4; 4	WIN; R5; 2	BAR; R6; 12	BAR; R7; 10	BAR; R8; 10	HDV; R9; 3	HDV; R10; 4	HDV; R11; 4	QLD; R12; 5	ORA; R13; 19	SAN; R14; 31	BAT; R15; Ret	SUR; R16; 4	SUR; R17; Ret	PUK; R18; 21	PUK; R19; 3	PUK; R20; 2	EAS; R21; 2	EAS; R22; 2																		4th	1770
2004	Paul Weel Racing	50	Holden VY Commodore	ADE; R1; 14	ADE; R2; 3	EAS; R3; 13	PUK; R4; 2	PUK; R5; 1	**PUK**; **R6**; **1**	HDV; R7; 4	HDV; R8; 17	HDV; R9; 10	BAR; R10; 2	BAR; R11; 1	**BAR**; **R12**; **1**	QLD; R13; 5	WIN; R14; 3	ORA; R15; 4	ORA; R16; 3	SAN; R17; 10	BAT; R18; 12	SUR; R19; 7	SUR; R20; Ret	SYM; R21; 10	SYM; R22; 24	SYM; R23; 2	EAS; R24; 3	EAS; R25; 21	EAS; R26; 23														3rd	1920
2005	Ford Performance Racing	6	Ford BA Falcon	ADE; R1; 19	ADE; R2; 11	PUK; R3; 7	PUK; R4; 11	PUK; R5; 7	BAR; R6; 16	BAR; R7; 7	BAR; R8; 22	EAS; R9; 33	EAS; R10; 23	SHA; R11; 7	SHA; R12; 20	SHA; R13; 6	HDV; R14; Ret	HDV; R15; 9	HDV; R16; 8	QLD; R17; 9	ORA; R18; 7	ORA; R19; 7	SAN; R20; 6	BAT; R21; 14	SUR; R22; 8	SUR; R23; 9	SUR; R24; 9	SYM; R25; 7	SYM; R26; 17	SYM; R27; 16	PHI; R28; 31	PHI; R29; 13	PHI; R30; 7										9th	1566
2006	Ford Performance Racing	6	Ford BA Falcon	ADE; R1; 25	ADE; R2; 15	PUK; R3; 3	PUK; R4; 20	PUK; R5; 20	BAR; R6; 5	BAR; R7; Ret	BAR; R8; 28	**WIN**; **R9**; **1**	WIN; R10; 20	WIN; R11; 2	**HDV**; **R12**; **24**	HDV; R13; 1	HDV; R14; 4	QLD; R15; 2	QLD; R16; 8	QLD; R17; 3	**ORA**; **R18**; **4**	ORA; R19; 18	ORA; R20; Ret	SAN; R21; 1	BAT; R22; Ret	SUR; R23; 7	SUR; R24; 6	SUR; R25; 4	SYM; R26; 1	**SYM**; **R27**; **3**	SYM; R28; 2	BHR; R29; 1	**BHR**; **R30**; **2**	BHR; R31; 2	PHI; R32; 10	PHI; R33; 8	PHI; R34; 4						5th	2868
2007	Britek Motorsport	25	Ford BF Falcon	ADE; R1; 10	ADE; R2; 14	BAR; R3; DNS	BAR; R4; DNS	BAR; R5; DNS	PUK; R6; Ret	PUK; R7; 16	PUK; R8; 25	WIN; R9; 7	WIN; R10; 9	WIN; R11; 24	EAS; R12; 8	EAS; R13; 22	EAS; R14; 14	HDV; R15; Ret	HDV; R16; Ret	HDV; R17; Ret	QLD; R18; 17	QLD; R19; Ret	QLD; R20; Ret	ORA; R21; 12	ORA; R22; 16	ORA; R23; Ret	SAN; R24; Ret	BAT; R25; Ret	SUR; R26; Ret	SUR; R27; DNS	SUR; R28; DNS	BHR; R29; 19	BHR; R30; Ret	BHR; R31; Ret	SYM; R32; 17	SYM; R33; 18	SYM; R34; 9	PHI; R35; Ret	PHI; R36; 15	PHI; R37; 12			21st	71
2008	Britek Motorsport	25	Ford BF Falcon	ADE; R1; Ret	ADE; R2; 10	EAS; R3; 20	EAS; R4; 22	EAS; R5; 20	HAM; R6; 11	HAM; R7; 12	HAM; R8; 13	BAR; R9; Ret	BAR; R10; 14	BAR; R11; 13	SAN; R12; Ret	SAN; R13; 15	SAN; R14; 14	HDV; R15; Ret	HDV; R16; 18	HDV; R17; Ret	QLD; R18; 18	QLD; R19; Ret	QLD; R20; 25	WIN; R21; 20	WIN; R22; 8	WIN; R23; 10	PHI; Q 3	PHI; R24; 11	BAT; R25; 9	SUR; R26; 24	SUR; R27; Ret	SUR; R28; Ret	BHR; R29; 22	BHR; R30; 13	BHR; R31; 14	SYM; R32; 7	SYM; R33; 11	SYM; R34; Ret	ORA; R35; 13	ORA; R36; 7	ORA; R37; 7		19th	1438
2009	Britek Motorsport	25	Ford FG Falcon	ADE; R1; 12	ADE; R2; 11	HAM; R3; 21	HAM; R4; 18	WIN; R5; 14	WIN; R6; Ret	SYM; R7; 26	SYM; R8; 7	HDV; R9; 16	HDV; R10; 19	TOW; R11; 16	TOW; R12; 18	SAN; R13; Ret	SAN; R14; 19	QLD; R15; 8	QLD; R16; 9	PHI; Q 3	PHI; R17; 25	BAT; R18; 11	SUR; R19; Ret	SUR; R20; 20	SUR; R21; 8	SUR; R22; 4	**PHI**; **R23**; **16**	PHI; R24; 5	BAR; R25; 24	BAR; R26; 6	SYD; R27; 3	SYD; R28; Ret											19th	1607
2010	Brad Jones Racing	14	Holden VE Commodore	YMC; R1; 21	YMC; R2; 10	BHR; R3; 13	BHR; R4; 24	ADE; R5; 6	ADE; R6; 26	HAM; R7; 21	HAM; R8; 13	QLD; R9; 13	QLD; R10; 11	WIN; R11; 7	WIN; R12; Ret	HDV; R13; 12	HDV; R14; 20	TOW; R15; Ret	TOW; R16; 18	PHI; R17; Ret	BAT; R18; 4	SUR; R19; 7	SUR; R20; Ret	SYM; R21; 12	SYM; R22; 3	SAN; R23; 14	SAN; R24; 24	SYD; R25; 2	SYD; R26; Ret														14th	1642
2011	Brad Jones Racing	8	Holden VE Commodore	YMC; R1; Ret	YMC; R2; 2	ADE; R3; 4	ADE; R4; 23	HAM; R5; 19	HAM; R6; 11	BAR; R7; 6	BAR; R8; 1	BAR; R9; 2	WIN; R10; 7	WIN; R11; 1	HID; R12; Ret	HID; R13; Ret	TOW; R14; 9	TOW; R15; 22	QLD; R16; 21	QLD; R17; 14	QLD; R18; 28	PHI; R19; 7	BAT; R20; 5	SUR; R21; 21	SUR; R22; Ret	SYM; R23; 25	SYM; R24; DNS	SAN; R25	SAN; R26	SYD; R27; Ret	SYD; R28; 9												16th	1633
2012	Brad Jones Racing	8	Holden VE Commodore	ADE; R1; Ret	ADE; R2; 16	SYM; R3; 25	SYM; R4; 14	HAM; R5; 12	HAM; R6; 21	BAR; R7; 10	BAR; R8; 8	BAR; R9; 4	PHI; R10; 8	PHI; R11; 3	HID; R12; 13	HID; R13; 13	TOW; R14; Ret	TOW; R15; 10	QLD; R16; 20	QLD; R17; 17	SMP; R18; 10	SMP; R19; 8	SAN; QR; 10	SAN; R20; 13	BAT; R21; 21	SUR; R22; 12	SUR; R23; Ret	YMC; R24; 19	YMC; R25; 17	YMC; R26; Ret	WIN; R27; 20	WIN; R28; 6	SYD; R29; Ret	SYD; R30; 9									16th	1737
2013	Brad Jones Racing	8	Holden VF Commodore	ADE; R1; 22	ADE; R2; Ret	SYM; R3; 4	**SYM**; **R4**; **1**	SYM; R5; 4	PUK; R6; 2	PUK; R7; 4	PUK; R8; 6	**PUK**; **R9**; **1**	BAR; R10; 4	**BAR**; **R11**; **2**	BAR; R12; 3	COA; R13; 12	COA; R14; 21	COA; R15; 8	COA; R16; 7	HID; R17; 8	HID; R18; 13	HID; R19; 10	TOW; R20; 5	TOW; R21; 16	QLD; R22; 7	QLD; R23; 5	QLD; R24; 7	WIN; R25; 3	**WIN**; **R26**; **2**	WIN; R27; Ret	SAN; R28; 24	BAT; R29; 5	SUR; R30; DNS	SUR; R31; 15	PHI; R32; 24	PHI; R33; 23	PHI; R34; 4	SYD; R35; 4	SYD; R36; 2				7th	2381
2014	Brad Jones Racing	8	Holden VF Commodore	ADE; R1; 8	ADE; R2; 21	ADE; R3; Ret	SYM; R4; 15	SYM; R5; 17	SYM; R6; 17	WIN; R7; 4	WIN; R8; 7	WIN; R9; 4	**PUK**; **R10**; **1**	PUK; R11; 12	PUK; R12; 23	PUK; R13; 6	BAR; R14; 13	BAR; R15; 17	BAR; R16; 6	HID; R17; 7	HID; R18; 12	HID; R19; 20	TOW; R20; 7	TOW; R21; 17	**TOW**; **R22**; **17**	QLD; R23; 18	QLD; R24; 11	QLD; R25; 17	SMP; R26; 9	SMP; R27; 4	SMP; R28; 6	SAN; QR; 15	SAN; R29; Ret	BAT; R30; 14	SUR; R31; 15	SUR; R32; 18	PHI; R33; 6	PHI; R34; 16	PHI; R35; 7	SYD; R36; 9	SYD; R37; 4	SYD; R38; 9	11th	1927
2015	Brad Jones Racing	8	Holden VF Commodore	ADE; R1; 12	ADE; R2; 5	ADE; R3; 11	SYM; R4; 19	SYM; R5; 15	SYM; R6; 12	BAR; R7; 5	BAR; R8; 13	BAR; R9; 16	WIN; R10; 11	WIN; R11; 14	WIN; R12; 13	HID; R13; 19	HID; R14; 13	HID; R15; 8	TOW; R16; 19	TOW; R17; 12	QLD; R18; Ret	QLD; R19; 16	QLD; R20; 9	SMP; R21; 10	SMP; R22; 24	SMP; R23; 3	SAN; QR; 17	SAN; R24; 22	BAT; R25; 7	SUR; R26; 22	SUR; R27; 23	PUK; R28; Ret	PUK; R29; DNS	PUK; R30; 18	PHI; R31; 14	PHI; R32; 12	PHI; R33; 23	SYD; R34; 3	SYD; R35; 23	SYD; R36; 20			16th	1671
2016	Brad Jones Racing	8	Holden VF Commodore	ADE; R1; 19	ADE; R2; 8	ADE; R3; 8	SYM; R4; 6	SYM; R5; 10	PHI; R6; 10	PHI; R7; Ret	BAR; R8; 16	BAR; R9; 13	WIN; R10; 11	WIN; R11; 16	HID; R12; 12	HID; R13; 16	TOW; R14; 14	TOW; R15; 9	QLD; R16; 16	QLD; R17; 18	SMP; R18; 18	SMP; R19; 17	SAN; QR; 23	SAN; R20; 21	BAT; R21; Ret	SUR; R22; 12	SUR; R23; 19	PUK; R24; Ret	PUK; R25; DNS	PUK; R26; 16	PUK; R27; 19	SYD; R28; 18	SYD; R29; Ret										17th	1459
2017	Britek Motorsport	56	Ford FG X Falcon	ADE; R1; 21	ADE; R2; 15	SYM; R3; 6	SYM; R4; Ret	PHI; R5; 7	PHI; R6; 25	BAR; R7; 16	BAR; R8; 13	WIN; R9; 26	WIN; R10; 18	HID; R11; 15	HID; R12; 13	TOW; R13; 23	TOW; R14; 19	QLD; R15; Ret	QLD; R16; 11	SMP; R17; 13	SMP; R18; 8	SAN; QR; 23	SAN; R19; 19	BAT; R20; 8	SUR; R21; 9	SUR; R22; 16	PUK; R23; 5	PUK; R24; 8	NEW; R25; Ret	NEW; R26; 22													20th	1524
2018	Team 18	18	Holden ZB Commodore	ADE; R1	ADE; R2	MEL; R3	MEL; R4	MEL; R5	MEL; R6	SYM; R7	SYM; R8	PHI; R9	PHI; R10	BAR; R11	BAR; R12	WIN; R13	WIN; R14	HID; R15	HID; R16	TOW; R17	TOW; R18	QLD; R19	QLD; R20	SMP; R21	BEN; R22	BEN; R23	SAN; QR; DNF	SAN; R24; 23	BAT; R25; 21	SUR; R26; 15	SUR; R27; C	PUK; R28	PUK; R29	NEW; R30	NEW; R31								48th	216

=== Bathurst 1000 results ===
Year	Team	Car	Co-driver	Position	Laps
1997	Alan Jones Racing	Ford Falcon EL	(Australia) Alan Jones (United States) Scott Pruett	11th	153
1998	Stone Brothers Racing	Ford Falcon EL	(New Zealand) Steven Richards	**1st**	161
1999	Stone Brothers Racing	Ford Falcon AU	(New Zealand) Craig Baird	DNF	145
2000	Dick Johnson Racing	Ford Falcon AU	(New Zealand) Paul Radisich	**2nd**	161
2001	Holden Racing Team	Holden Commodore VX	(Czech Republic) Tomas Mezera	DNF	126
2002	Holden Racing Team	Holden Commodore VX	(Czech Republic) Tomas Mezera	**3rd**	161
2003	Team Brock	Holden Commodore VX	(Australia) Paul Weel	DNF	44
2004	Paul Weel Racing	Holden Commodore VY	(Australia) Paul Weel	12th	159
2005	Ford Performance Racing	Ford Falcon BA	(Australia) David Brabham	14th	152
2006	Ford Performance Racing	Ford Falcon BA	(Australia) Mark Winterbottom	DNF	28
2007	Britek Motorsport	Ford Falcon BF	(Australia) Adam Macrow	DNF	149
2008	Britek Motorsport	Ford Falcon BF	(Australia) Adam Macrow	9th	161
2009	Britek Motorsport	Ford Falcon FG	(Australia) Karl Reindler	11th	161
2010	Brad Jones Racing	Holden Commodore VE	(New Zealand) Matthew Halliday	4th	161
2011	Brad Jones Racing	Holden Commodore VE	(Australia) Andrew Jones	5th	161
2012	Brad Jones Racing	Holden Commodore VE	(Australia) Andrew Jones	21st	153
2013	Brad Jones Racing	Holden Commodore VF	(Australia) Andrew Jones	5th	161
2014	Brad Jones Racing	Holden Commodore VF	(Australia) Andrew Jones	14th	158
2015	Brad Jones Racing	Holden Commodore VF	(Australia) Andrew Jones	7th	161
2016	Brad Jones Racing	Holden Commodore VF	(Australia) Andrew Jones	DNF	89
2017	Britek Motorsport	Ford Falcon FG X	(Australia) Garry Jacobson	8th	161
2018	Team 18	Holden Commodore ZB	(Australia) Lee Holdsworth	21st	157

=== American Open-Wheel ===
(key)

==== Indy Lights results ====
Year	Team	1	2	3	4	5	6	7	8	9	10	11	12	Rank	Points	Ref
2000	Dorricott Racing	LBH; 2	MIL; 2	DET; 18	POR; 1	MIC; 9	CHI; DNS	ROA; 3	VAN; 14	LS; 8	STL; 3	HOU; 16	FON; 14	**6th**	**91**	

==== Champ Car ====
Year	Team	No.	1	2	3	4	5	6	7	8	9	10	11	12	13	14	15	16	17	18	19	20	Rank	Points	Ref
2000	Della Penna Motorsports	10	MIA	LBH	RIO	MOT	NZR	MIL	DET	POR	CLE	TOR	MIC	CHI	MDO	ROA	VAN	LS	STL	HOU	SRF; 18	FON	**31st**	**0**	

=== Complete American Le Mans Series results ===
(key) (Races in bold indicate pole position) (Races in italics indicate fastest lap)

Year	Entrant	Class	Chassis	Engine	1	2	3	4	5	6	7	8	9	10	11	12	Rank	Points
2000	Panoz Motor Sports	LMP	Panoz LMP-1 Roadster-S	Élan 6L8 6.0L V8	SEB	CHA	SIL	NÜR	SON	MOS	TEX	ROS	PET	MON	LSV	**ADE** ovr:9 cls:3	36th	24

==== Complete FIA World Endurance Championship results ====
Year	Entrant	Class	Car	Engine	1	2	3	4	5	6	7	8	Rank	Points
2013	8 Star Motorsports	LMGTE Am	Ferrari 458 Italia GT2	Ferrari 4.5 L V8	SIL	SPA	LMS; 8	SÃO	COA	FUJ	SHA	BHR	41st	1

==== Bathurst 24 Hour results ====
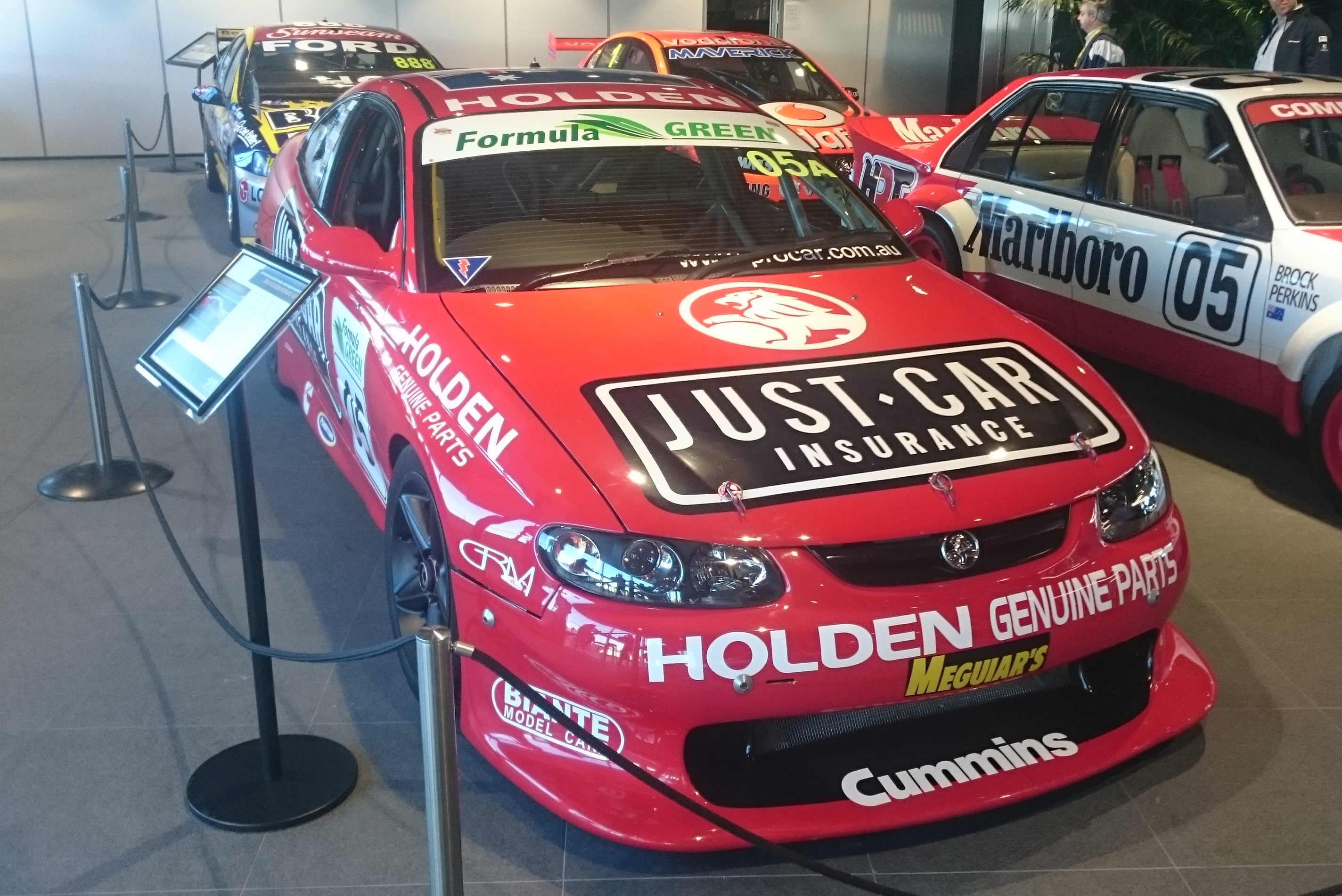
The 2003 Bathurst 24 Hour winning Holden Monaro

Year	Team	Co-drivers	Car	Class	Laps	Overall position	Class position
2003	(Australia) Garry Rogers Motorsport	(Australia) Peter Brock (New Zealand) Greg Murphy (Australia) Todd Kelly	Holden Monaro 427C	A	527	**1st**	**1st**

==== 12 Hours of Sebring results ====
Year	Team	Co-drivers	Car	Class	Laps	Overall position	Class position
2006	(United Kingdom) Aston Martin Racing	(France) Stéphane Sarrazin (Portugal) Pedro Lamy	Aston Martin DBR9	GT1	337	4th	**2nd**

==== Bathurst 12 Hour results ====
Year	Team	Co-drivers	Car	Class	Laps	Overall position	Class position
2010	(Australia) Action Racing	(Australia) Marcus Zukanovic (Denmark) Allan Simonsen	Ford Mustang Shelby GT500	I	121	26th	**1st**
2013	(France) Team Peugeot RCZ	(France) Stéphane Caillet (France) Julien Rueflin	Peugeot RCZ Cup	I1	214	23rd	**2nd**
2014	(Australia) skwirk.com.au	(Australia) Warren Luff (Australia) Rod Salmon (Australia) Liam Talbot	Audi R8 LMS Ultra	A	–	DNS	DNS

==== 24 Hours of Le Mans results ====
Year	Team	Co-drivers	Car	Class	Laps	Overall position	Class position
2013	(United States) 8 Star Motorsports	(Venezuela) Enzo Potolicchio (Portugal) Rui Águas	Ferrari 458 Italia GT2	LMGTEAm	294	37th	10th

Sporting positions
Preceded by Paul Stokell	Winner of the Australian Drivers' Championship; 1997	Succeeded by Scott Dixon
Preceded by Larry Perkins; Russell Ingall	Winner of the Bathurst Classic; 1998 (with Steven Richards)	Succeeded by Steven Richards; Greg Murphy
Preceded by Garth Tander	Winner of the Clipsal 500; 2001	Succeeded by Mark Skaife
Awards and achievements
Preceded by Inaugural	Jason Richards Memorial Trophy; 2013	Succeeded by Mark Winterbottom
