= Mark Noske =

Australian racing driver

- Nationality: Australian
- Born: 25 July 1975 (age 51)
- Retired: 2010
- Relatives: Tony Noske (father)

V8 Supercar
- Years active: 1997-2010
- Teams: Allan Moffat Racing; Gibson Motorsport; Holden Young Lions; Holden Racing Team; Rod Nash Racing; Prancing Horse Racing; Garry Rogers Motorsport; Stone Brothers Racing; WPS Racing; Robert Smith Racing; HSV Dealer Team; Tasman Motorsport; Lucas Dumbrell Motorsport
- Starts: 45
- Wins: 0
- Poles: 0
- Best finish: 19th in 1999

Previous series
- 1994-95 1996 1997-98 2000-01 2011: Australian Formula Ford Champ. US Formula Ford 2000; Australian Drivers' Champ. Australian Nations Cup; Australian Carrera Cup

Mark Anthony Noske (born 25 July 1975) is a former Australian racing car driver. He has scored round wins in various Australian championships including the Australian Drivers' Championship, the Australian Formula Ford Championship and the Australian Nations Cup Championship.

== Formula Racing ==
The son of former 1980's Sprintcar and Group A racer Tony Noske, Mark started in Formula Ford in Australia in 1992 after three seasons of Karting finishing fourth in 1994 and third in 1995 championships. In 1997 and 1998, he entered the Formula Holden class finishing sixth and third respectively. He made a brief return in 2002 for two races only. He competed in the US Formula Ford 2000 series.

== Touring/GT Racing ==
Noske raced for Allan Moffat Racing at the 1995 Bathurst 1000, Gibson Motorsport at the 1996 Sandown 500 and Bathurst 1000 and the Holden Racing Team in 1997/98. His only full season was in 1999 driving for the Holden Young Lions program. He continued as a co-driver for endurance events and was drafted into the vacant Lucas Dumbrell Motorsport seat for the remainder of the 2010 V8 Supercar Championship Series.

Noske tried GT racing in the Australian Nations Cup finishing third in 2000 and seventh in 2001, both years driving a Ferrari 360 Challenge for Prancing Horse Racing. In 2011 he stood in for an ill Jason Richards as a guest driver at the Australian Carrera Cup Championship third round in Townsville.

Noske has also done selected Production Car Racing mainly in long-distance events. His best finish was in the 1995 Eastern Creek 12 Hour finishing third driving a Porsche 911 RSCS.

== Results ==
=== Career results ===
Season	Series	Position	Car	Entrant
1992	Motorcraft Formula Ford Driver to Europe Series	16th	Van Diemen RF91 Ford	Mark Noske
1993	Australian Formula Ford Championship	11th	Swift SC93F Ford	Mark Noske
1994	Australian Formula Ford Championship	4th	Van Diemen RF94 Ford	Valvoline Australia Pty Ltd
1995	Australian Formula Ford Championship	3rd	Van Diemen RF95 Ford	AMSA Team Agip
1997	Australian Drivers' Championship	6th	Lola T93/50 Holden	Mark Noske
1998	Australian Drivers' Championship	3rd	Reynard 95D Holden	Arthur Abrahams
1999	Shell Championship Series	19th	Holden VS Commodore; Holden VT Commodore	Young Lions Racing; Holden Racing Team
2000	Australian Nations Cup Championship	3rd	Ferrari 360 Modena Challenge	Prancing Horse Racing
2001	Australian Nations Cup Championship	7th	Ferrari 360 Modena Challenge	Prancing Horse Racing
2002	Australian Drivers' Championship	13th	Reynard 96D Holden	John Herman
2003	V8 Supercar Championship Series	28th	Ford AU Falcon; Ford BA Falcon	ICS Team Ford; Caltex Havoline Race Team
2004	V8 Supercar Championship Series	35th	Ford BA Falcon	WPS
2006	V8 Supercar Championship Series	52nd	Holden VZ Commodore	Tasman Motorsport
2008	V8 Supercar Championship Series	42nd	Holden VE Commodore	Sprint Gas Racing
2009	V8 Supercar Championship Series	37th	Holden VE Commodore	Sprint Gas Racing
2010	V8 Supercar Championship Series	52nd	Holden VE Commodore	Gulf Western Oil Racing

=== Complete Bathurst 1000 results ===
Year	Car#	Team	Car	Co-driver	Position	Laps
1995	9	Allan Moffat Racing	Ford EB Falcon	(Australia) Andrew Miedecke	DNF	16
1996	6	Gibson Motorsport	Holden VR Commodore	(Australia) Garry Waldon	9th	158
1997	97	Holden Young Lions	Holden VS Commodore	(Australia) Jason Bargwanna	DNS	0
1998	50	Holden Racing Team	Holden VT Commodore	(New Zealand) Greg Murphy	DNF	86
1999	15	Holden Young Lions	Holden VT Commodore	(Australia) Todd Kelly	6th	161
2001	888	Prancing Horse Racing	Ford AU Falcon	(New Zealand) Craig Baird	DNF	27
2002	35	Garry Rogers Motorsport	Holden VX Commodore	(Australia) Jamie Whincup	DNF	72
2003	9	Stone Brothers Racing	Ford BA Falcon	(Australia) Mark Winterbottom	DNF	102
2004	14	Robert Smith Racing	Holden VY Commodore	(Australia) Lee Holdsworth	DNF	59
2005	15	HSV Dealer Team	Holden VZ Commodore	(Australia) Tim Leahey	DNF	32
2006	23	Tasman Motorsport	Holden VZ Commodore	(Australia) Owen Kelly	15th	159
2007	3	Tasman Motorsport	Holden VE Commodore	(Australia) Jay Verdnik	DNF	138
2008	51	Tasman Motorsport	Holden VE Commodore	(Australia) Dale Wood	13th	160
2009	3	Tasman Motorsport	Holden VE Commodore	(Australia) Jason Bargwanna	6th	161
2010	30	Lucas Dumbrell Motorsport	Holden VE Commodore	(Australia) Nathan Pretty	17th	161
