= 1993 Australian Formula Ford Championship =

Motor racing competition

The 1993 Australian Formula Ford Championship (promoted as the 1993 Motorcraft Australian Formula Ford Championship) was a CAMS sanctioned Australian motor racing championship for Formula Ford racing cars. It was the 24th national series for Formula Fords to be held in Australia, and the first to carry the Australian Formula Ford Championship name.

The championship was won by Craig Lowndes driving a Van Diemen RF93.

== Calendar ==
The championship was contested over an eight round series with two heats per round.

Round	Circuit	Dates	Round winner	Map
1	(New South Wales) Amaroo Park	28 February	(Australia) Con Toparis	1993 Australian Formula Ford Championship is located in Australia
2	(Tasmania) Symmons Plains Raceway	14 March	(New Zealand) Steven Richards	1993 Australian Formula Ford Championship is located in Australia
3	(Victoria (state)) Phillip Island Grand Prix Circuit	4 April	(Australia) Stephen White	1993 Australian Formula Ford Championship is located in Australia
4	(Queensland) Lakeside International Raceway	18 April	(Australia) Stephen White	1993 Australian Formula Ford Championship is located in Australia
5	(Victoria (state)) Winton Motor Raceway	16 May	(Australia) Craig Lowndes	1993 Australian Formula Ford Championship is located in Australia
6	(New South Wales) Eastern Creek Raceway	6 June	(Australia) Steven Ellery	1993 Australian Formula Ford Championship is located in Australia
7	(South Australia) Mallala Motor Sport Park	4 July	(New Zealand) Steven Richards	1993 Australian Formula Ford Championship is located in Australia
8	(New South Wales) Oran Park Raceway	8 August	(Australia) Craig Lowndes	1993 Australian Formula Ford Championship is located in Australia

== Results ==
Championship points were awarded at each race on the following basis:

Position	1st	2nd	3rd	4th	5th	6th	7th	8th	9th	10th
Points	20	16	14	12	10	8	6	4	2	1

Pos	Driver	No.	Car	Entrant	(New South Wales) AMA	(Tasmania) SYM	(Victoria (state)) PHI	(Queensland) LAK	(Victoria (state)) WIN	(New South Wales) EAS	(South Australia) MAL	(New South Wales) ORA	Pts
1	(Australia) Craig Lowndes	5	Van Diemen RF93	Craig Lowndes	26	8	30	32	36	32	28	36	228
2	(Australia) Stephen White	4	Swift SC93F	Stephen White	17	30	32	40	22	20	32	16	209
3	(Australia) Andrew Reid	31	Swift SC93F	Linear Bearings	-	22	30	24	20	26	7	12	141
4	(New Zealand) Steven Richards	7	Van Diemen RF93	Garry Rogers Motorsport	14	34	-	-	6	16	40	21	131
5	(Australia) Gavin Monaghan	10	Van Diemen RF92	Gavin Monaghan	30	16	16	28	-	6	10	22	128
6	(Australia) Steven Ellery	15	Van Diemen RF93	Steven Ellery Racing	12	-	1	9	26	40	4	20	112
7	(Australia) Con Toparis	21	Van Diemen RF93	Eastern Creek Raceway	34	24	10	2	9	6	18	-	103
8	(Australia) Cameron Prince		Van Diemen RF92		2	24	28	14	1	-	-	-	69
9	(Australia) Michael Dutton		Swift SC92F		20	-	10	-	8	18	-	10	66
10	(Australia) David Hardman	35	Van Diemen RF92	David Hardman	16	4	15	-	30	-	-	-	65
11	(Australia) Mark Noske	17	Swift SC93F	Mark Noske	-	-	-	20	2	-	24	8	54
12	(Australia) Leif Corben	24	Van Diemen RF90		-	-	-	2	18	16	-	-	36
13	(Australia) Cameron Partington	13	Van Diemen RF92	Cameron Partington	8	10	4	-	-	1	4	6	33
14	(Australia) Darren Edwards	14	Swift SC93F	D Edwards	-	4	-	-	8	-	14	-	26
15	(Australia) Matthew Martin		Swift SC90		-	-	-	7	-	1	-	14	22
16	(Australia) Dugal McDougall	48	Van Diemen RF89	Dugal McDougall	-	-	-	-	-	-	4	13	17
17	(Australia) Jason Bright	71	Spectrum 05	Borland Racing Developments	5	9	-	-	-	-	-	-	14
18	(Australia) Ashley Cutchie	32	Van Diemen RF92	Peter Sorrell	-	1	-	8	-	-	1	-	10
=	(Australia) Gerard Manion		Swift FB89		-	-	10	-	-	-	-	-	10
=	(Australia) Gary Gosatti	9	Van Diemen RF93	Steven Ellery Racing	-	-	-	-	-	4	-	6	10
21	(Australia) Paul Mulhearn		Swift SC93F		2	-	-	-	-	-	-	-	2
=	(Australia) David Harrington	58	Van Diemen RF89	David Harrington	-	-	-	-	-	-	-	2	2
Pos	Driver	No.	Car	Entrant	(New South Wales) AMA	(Tasmania) SYM	(Victoria (state)) PHI	(Queensland) LAK	(Victoria (state)) WIN	(New South Wales) EAS	(South Australia) MAL	(New South Wales) ORA	Pts
