= 1997 Australian Drivers' Championship =

Motor racing competition

Seasons
- ← 1996 1998 →

The 1997 Australian Drivers' Championship was a motor racing competition open to drivers of racing cars complying with CAMS Formula Holden regulations. The championship winner was awarded the 1997 CAMS Gold Star as the Australian Drivers' Champion. It was the 41st running of the Australian Drivers' Championship, and the ninth to feature the Formula Holden category which had been developed during 1988. The championship began on 15 March 1997 at the Calder Park Raceway and ended on 3 August at Oran Park Raceway after seven rounds of a series which was promoted as the "Holden Australian Drivers Championship".

Jason Bright, in his second season in Formula Holden and as new team leader of Birrana Racing, raced to the title, winning eight of the 14 races over the course of the season, wrapping up the championship at the sixth round and choosing to miss the final round. SH Racing's Jason Bargwanna finished second just 13 points behind Bright, although 40 of his points came from two wins at Oran Park in Bright's absence. Mark Noske, driving a Lola, was the only driver to take race wins away from the two Jasons. He was in contention for the championship early in the season, but his charge faded mid-year as he experienced problems at Winton and Eastern Creek and lost third place in the points to New Zealand teenager Scott Dixon in the Ralt Australia prepared Reynard.

== Drivers ==
The following drivers competed in the 1997 Australian Drivers' Championship.

Driver	No	Car	Entrant
(Australia) Jason Bright	2	Reynard 91D	Garry & Warren Smith
(Australia) Darren Edwards	3	Reynard 92D	Clem Smith
(Australia) Bruce Williams	4	Reynard 92D	Simoco Pacific P/L
(Australia) Stan Keen	5	Shrike NB89H	Stan Keen
(United Kingdom) James Taylor	6	Reynard 91D	
(Australia) Adam Kaplan	7	Reynard 91D	Hunter Holden
(Australia) Dean Irwin	8	Ralt RT21	Dean Irwin
(Australia) Brenton Ramsay	9	Reynard 91D	Birrana Racing Pty Ltd
(Australia) Mark Noske	10	Lola T93/50	Mark Noske
(New Zealand) Scott Dixon	11	Reynard 91D	Graham Watson
(Australia) Tony Blanche	12	Reynard 90D	Graham Watson
(Australia) Ryan McLeod	12	Reynard 90D	
(Australia) Graham Watson	12	Reynard 90D	
(Australia) Chas Talbot	14	March 87B	
(Australia) Stephen White	15	Reynard 91D	
(Australia) Darren Pate	19	Reynard 92D; Reynard 95D	Arthur Abrahams
(Australia) Stephen Cramp	21	Reynard 94D	Stephen Cramp
(Australia) Bob Minogue	29	Reynard 92D	Bob Minogue
(Australia) Owen Osborne	34	Reynard 92D	NHP Electrical
(Australia) Jason Bargwanna	47	Reynard 92D	SH Racing
(Australia) Bob Power	48	Ralt RT23	
(Australia) Kevin Weeks	70	Reynard 91D	
(Australia) Chris Hocking	74	Reynard 92D	GL Knight and Associates
(Australia) Brian Sampson	78	Cheetah Mk. 9	
(Australia) Chas Jacobsen	87	Reynard 92D	Chas Jacobsen
(Australia) Al Callegher	99	Reynard 90D	Albert Callegher

Note: Formula Holden technical regulations mandated that cars be powered by 3.8 litre Holden V6 engines.

== Race calendar ==
The 1997 Australian Drivers' Championship was contested over seven rounds held in three different states. Each round consisted of two races.

Rd.	Circuit	Location, State	Date	Winner
1	Calder Park Raceway	Melbourne, Victoria	15 March	Jason Bright
2	Phillip Island Grand Prix Circuit	Phillip Island, Victoria	13 April	Jason Bright
3	Sandown Raceway	Melbourne, Victoria	27 April	Jason Bright
4	Winton Motor Raceway	Benalla, Victoria	18 May	Jason Bargwanna
5	Eastern Creek Raceway	Sydney, New South Wales	25 May	Jason Bright
6	Mallala Motor Sport Park	Mallala, South Australia	13 July	Mark Noske
7	Oran Park Raceway	Sydney, New South Wales	3 August	Jason Bargwanna

== Points system ==
Championship points were awarded on a 20–15–12–10–8–6–4–3–2–1 basis for the first ten places in each race.

== Championship results ==
Pos	Driver	Rd 1		Rd 2		Rd 3		Rd 4		Rd 5		Rd 6		Rd 7		Pts
1	Jason Bright	1st	(5th)	1st	1st	1st	1st	3rd	2nd	1st	1st	Ret	1st			187
2	Jason Bargwanna	3rd	(DNS)	2nd	2nd	2nd	DNS	1st	1st	2nd	2nd	Ret	2nd	1st	1st	182
3	Scott Dixon	5th	(4th)	4th	6th	5th	5th	4th	4th	4th	4th	Ret	4th	4th	2nd	115
4	Darren Pate	2nd	(DNS)	8th	3rd	DSQ	DNS	2nd	3rd	3rd	Ret	2nd	5th	5th	4th	110
5	Darren Edwards	10th	(DNS)	5th	5th	3rd	2nd	5th	5th	DNS	DNS	3rd	Ret	2nd	3rd	99
6	Mark Noske	Ret	(1st)	3rd	4th	4th	3rd	Ret	DNS	DNS	DNS	1st	3rd	3rd	5th	96
7	Bob Minogue	12th	(8th)	7th	8th	7th	6th	7th	7th	6th	6th	9th	8th	11th	9th	44
8	Brenton Ramsay	11th	(10th)	6th	7th	Ret	7th	Ret	Ret	8th	7th	5th	9th	8th	6th	40
9	Stephen Cramp	7th	(6th)			13th	DNS			7th	5th	4th	6th	7th	8th	39
10	Bruce Williams	Ret	(3rd)	9th	12th	6th	4th	DNS	Ret	5th	Ret	8th	7th	9th	12th	35
11	Adam Kaplan									Ret	3rd			6th	7th	22
12	Owen Osborne	8th	(7th)	10th	10th	8th	DNS	6th	6th	Ret	Ret	Ret	DNS			20
=	Chas Jacobsen	6th	(11th)	Ret	9th	11th	8th			10th	8th	7th	10th	Ret	11th	20
14	Kevin Weeks	4th	(2nd)													10
=	Chris Hocking	15th	(14th)	Ret	Ret	10th	9th	Ret	8th	9th	9th	Ret	11th	13th	14th	10
16	Stan Keen	13th	(Ret)									6th	13th	12th	13th	6
=	Dean Irwin	9th	(9th)	Ret	11th	9th	11th	DNS	DNS			Ret	12th	10th	10th	6
18	Chas Talbot							8th	9th							5
19	Brian Sampson	17th	(DNS)	11th	13th	14th	10th									1
Pos	Driver	Rd 1		Rd 2		Rd 3		Rd 4		Rd 5		Rd 6		Rd 7		Pts

Colour	Result
Gold	Winner
Silver	Second place
Bronze	Third place
Green	Points classification
Blue	Non-points classification
Blue	Non-classified finish (NC)
Purple	Retired, not classified (Ret)
Red	Did not qualify (DNQ)
Red	Did not pre-qualify (DNPQ)
Black	Disqualified (DSQ)
White	Did not start (DNS)
White	Withdrew (WD)
White	Race cancelled (C)
Blank	Did not practice (DNP)
Blank	Did not arrive (DNA)
Blank	Excluded (EX)

Note: Race 2 at the opening round at Calder was declared a No Race and no championship points were awarded.
