= 1994 Australian Formula Ford Championship =

CAMS sanctioned motor racing title

The 1994 Australian Formula Ford Championship was a CAMS sanctioned motor racing title for drivers of Formula Ford racing cars. It was the 25th national series for Formula Fords to be held in Australia and 2nd to carry the Australian Formula Ford Championship name.

1994 saw the series debut of young Queanbeyan driver and future multiple Formula One Grand Prix winner Mark Webber. Driving an ex-Craig Lowndes Van Diemen RF93 his father had purchased for him, Webber finished 14th in the series.

Steven Richards, the son of multiple Bathurst and Australian Touring Car Champion Jim Richards, dominated the series winning six of the eight rounds in his Valvoline sponsored Van Diemen. Finishing second (also in a Van Diemen) was Gavin Monaghan, with Jason Bright finishing third in his Swift SC93F.

Van Diemen was easily the most popular chassis in the series with over 20 appearing on the grids. Swift Racing Cars supplied seven cars, while the lone Reynard in the field was driven by another future Bathurst winner, Jason Bargwanna.

== Calendar ==
The championship was contested over an eight-round series with two races per round.

Round	Circuit	Dates	Round winner	Map
1	(New South Wales) Amaroo Park	27 February	(Australia) Gavin Monaghan	1994 Australian Formula Ford Championship is located in Australia
2	(Victoria (state)) Sandown Raceway	6 March	(New Zealand) Steven Richards	1994 Australian Formula Ford Championship is located in Australia
3	(Victoria (state)) Phillip Island Grand Prix Circuit	10 April	(Australia) Gavin Monaghan	1994 Australian Formula Ford Championship is located in Australia
4	(Queensland) Lakeside International Raceway	24 April	(New Zealand) Steven Richards	1994 Australian Formula Ford Championship is located in Australia
5	(Victoria (state)) Winton Motor Raceway	15 May	(New Zealand) Steven Richards	1994 Australian Formula Ford Championship is located in Australia
6	(South Australia) Mallala Motor Sport Park	26 June	(New Zealand) Steven Richards	1994 Australian Formula Ford Championship is located in Australia
7	(Western Australia) Wanneroo Raceway	3 July	(New Zealand) Steven Richards	1994 Australian Formula Ford Championship is located in Australia
8	(New South Wales) Oran Park Raceway	24 July	(New Zealand) Steven Richards	1994 Australian Formula Ford Championship is located in Australia

== Results ==
Championship points were awarded at each race on the following basis:

Position	1st	2nd	3rd	4th	5th	6th	7th	8th	9th	10th
Points	20	16	14	12	10	8	6	4	2	1

Pos	Driver	No.	Car	Entrant	(New South Wales) AMA	(Victoria (state)) SAN	(Victoria (state)) PHI	(Queensland) LAK	(Victoria (state)) WIN	(South Australia) MAL	(Western Australia) WAN	(New South Wales) ORA	Pts
1	(New Zealand) Steven Richards	4	Van Diemen RF94	Garry Rogers Motorsport	32	40	20	40	40	40	40	40	292
2	(Australia) Gavin Monaghan	5	Van Diemen RF94	Gavin Monaghan	40	14	36	8	32	22	22	30	204
3	(Australia) Jason Bright	50	Swift SC93F	Jason Bright	26	13	22	10	28	30	32	28	189
4	(Australia) Mark Noske	11	Van Diemen RF94	Garry Rogers Motorsport	26	-	12	32	24	18	26	-	138
5	(Australia) Cameron Partington	13	Van Diemen RF93	Cameron Partington	12	28	10	5	-	10	10	5	80
6	(Australia) Mathew Martin	15	Swift SC94F	McGuigan Bros Wines	-	13	6	28	8	8	-	12	75
7	(Australia) Darren Edwards	14	Swift SC93F	Darren Edwards	20	-	-	-	-	30	-	18	68
8	(Australia) Ashley Cutchie	18	Van Diemen RF92	Timezone	4	32	8	12	4	-	-	-	60
9	(Australia) Dugal McDougall	48	Van Diemen RF93	McDougall Motorsport	4	6	8	22	-	8	-	1	49
10	(Australia) Stephen Boulden	59	Van Diemen RF91	McDougall Motorsport	-	2	12	-	16	8	-	8	46
11	(Australia) Tim Wood		Swift SC92F		16	-	4	22	-	-	-	-	42
12	(Australia) David Harrington	22	Van Diemen RF93	David Harrington	1	8	2	3	20	-	-	-	34
13	(Australia) Geoff Full		Van Diemen RF94		-	16	14	-	-	-	-	-	30
13	(Australia) Mark Webber	38	Van Diemen RF93	Mark Webber	-	-	14	-	12	-	4	-	30
15	(Australia) Michael Dutton		Swift SC93F		-	-	2	-	-	-	-	26	28
16	(Australia) Ray Stubber	58	Van Diemen RF94	Fastlane Racing	-	-	-	-	-	-	22	-	22
17	(Australia) Paul Stephenson	41	Van Diemen RF92	Paul Stephenson	-	-	11	-	-	1	-	4	16
18	(Australia) Jason Bargwanna		Reynard 88F	Ugly Kid Racing	-	-	-	-	-	-	-	14	14
19	(Australia) Con Toparis		Swift SC94F		-	12	-	-	-	-	-	-	12
19	(Australia) Michael Henderson		Van Diemen RF90		-	-	-	-	-	-	12	-	12
21	(Australia) Shaun Walker		Van Diemen RF91		-	-	-	-	-	-	10	-	10
21	(Australia) Ricky Goddard	66	Van Diemen RF93	Ricky Goddard	-	-	-	-	-	10	-	-	10
23	(Australia) Leif Corben		Van Diemen RF90		1	-	-	4	2	-	-	-	7
23	(Australia) Gary Gosatti	20	Van Diemen RF94	Fastlane Racing	-	-	-	-	-	1	6	-	7
25	(Australia) Peter Fitzgerald	91	Van Diemen RF92	Peter Fitzgerald	-	2	4	-	-	-	-	-	6
26	(Australia) Tim Dore	77	Van Diemen RF94	Tim Dore	2	-	-	-	-	-	-	-	2
26	(Australia) Wayne Boatwright		Swift SC93F		2	-	-	-	-	-	-	-	2
28	(Australia) David Gosatti		Van Diemen RF90		-	-	-	-	-	-	1	-	1
28	(Australia) John McCowan		Van Diemen RF90		-	-	-	-	-	-	1	-	1
Pos	Driver	No.	Car	Entrant	(New South Wales) AMA	(Victoria (state)) SAN	(Victoria (state)) PHI	(Queensland) LAK	(Victoria (state)) WIN	(South Australia) MAL	(Western Australia) WAN	(New South Wales) ORA	Pts
