= 1998 Australian Drivers' Championship =

1998 Australian motorsport racing event

Seasons
- ← 1997 1999 →

The 1998 Australian Drivers' Championship was a CAMS sanctioned Australian motor racing title for drivers of cars conforming to Formula Holden regulations. The title was contested over a six-round, twelve race series with the winner awarded the CAMS Gold Star. Officially the "Holden Australian Drivers' Championship for the CAMS Gold Star", it was the 42nd Australian Drivers' Championship.

New Zealand racer Scott Dixon won the championship driving a (Reynard 92D) for SH Racing, to give the team their first ADC title after coming close to victory in 1997 with Jason Bargwanna. Dixon won five of the twelve races to finish ahead of Victorian racers Mark Noske (Reynard 95D) and Todd Kelly (Reynard 92D). Noske and Kelly each took three race wins, with Simon Wills (Reynard 92D) winning one, the first of his record 23 Australian Drivers' Championship career race victories.

== Teams and drivers ==
Team	Chassis	No	Driver	Rounds
Todd Kelly	Reynard 92D	2	(Australia) Todd Kelly	All
Ralt Australia	Reynard 92D	3	(Australia) Darren Edwards	2
Ralt Australia	Reynard 91D	11	(Australia) Darren Edwards	4–6
Ralt Australia	Reynard 91D	12	(Australia) John de Vries	1, 3–6
Birrana Racing	Reynard 91D	9	(Australia) Brenton Ramsay	All
NRC International	Reynard 95D	10	(Australia) Mark Noske	1–5
NRC International	Reynard 91D	11	(Austria) Markus Friesacher	1–3
NRC International	Reynard 92D	19	(Austria) Markus Friesacher	4
NRC International	Reynard 95D	19	(Austria) Markus Friesacher	5–6
Chas Talbot	March 87B	14	(Australia) Chas Talbot	1–2
Sun Wipes Formula Racing Team	Reynard 91D	15	(Australia) Les Crampton	1–5
Stephen Cramp	Reynard 94D	21	(Australia) Stephen Cramp	1
Hocking Motorsport	Reynard 92D	23	(Australia) Craig Bastian	2, 4–5
Hocking Motorsport	Reynard 94D	74	(Australia) Chris Hocking	1
Hocking Motorsport	Reynard 94D	74	(Japan) Akihiro Asai	2–6
Garry Haywood	Reynard 90D	26	(Australia) Garry Haywood	1–2
National Capital Motors	Ralt RT23	27	(Australia) Dale Brede	1, 4–5
Barshott Racing	Lola T93/50	28	(Australia) Roger Oakeshott	2–5
Greg Murphy Racing	Reynard 92D	31	(New Zealand) Simon Wills	4, 6
Ken Herd	Ralt RT21	33	(Australia) Ken Herd	4
NHP Electrical	Reynard 92D	34	(Australia) Owen Osbourne	All
Lautentius Consultants	Reynard 94D	36	(Sweden) Lars Johansson	1–3
Paul Stephenson	Reynard 91D	41	(Australia) Paul Stephenson	1
SH Racing	Reynard 92D	47	(New Zealand) Scott Dixon	All
Robert Power	Ralt RT23	48	(Australia) Robert Power	2–3, 5–6
Peter Hill	Reynard 92D	66	(Australia) Peter Hill	2
Damien Digby	Reynard 92D	69	(Australia) Damien Digby	1–4
Speco Thomas, Motor Improvement	Lola T91/50	78	(Australia) Brian Sampson	1–5
Chas Jacobsen	Reynard 92D	87	(Australia) Chas Jacobsen	2–5

== Calendar ==
The championship was contested over six rounds with two races per round.

Round	Circuit	Date
1	Sandown International Motor Raceway	1 February
2	Phillip Island Grand Prix Circuit	19 April
3	Winton Motor Raceway	3 May
4	Mallala Motor Sport Park	24 May
5	Calder Park Raceway	21 June
6	Oran Park International Raceway	2 August

== Points system ==
Championship points were awarded on a 20–15–12–10–8–6–4–3–2–1 basis to the first ten finishers in each race.

== Championship standings ==
					Sandown		Phillip Island		Winton		Mallala		Calder		Oran Park		Total
Position	Driver	No.	Car	Entrant	R1	R2	R1	R2	R1	R2	R1	R2	R1	R2	R1	R2	
1	Scott Dixon	47	Reynard 92D	SH Racing	20	15	15	10	20	15	20	15	20	10	12	15	187
2	Todd Kelly	2	Reynard 92D	Todd Kelly	15	20	–	20	12	10	15	–	15	7.5	10	20	144.5
3	Mark Noske	10	Reynard 95D	Arthur Abrahams	8	–	20	15	15	20	12	12	8	6	20	–	136
4	Brenton Ramsay	9	Reynard 91D & Reynard 94D	Birrana Racing Pty Ltd	10	–	12	12	4	12	–	10	6	4	4	10	84
5	Markus Friesacher	11 & 19	Reynard 91D & Reynard 92D	Ralt Australia & Arthur Abrahams	12	–	10	8	10	–	10	–	10	–	–	6	66
6	Darren Edwards	3 & 11	Reynard 92D & Reynard 91D	Ralt Australia Pty Ltd	–	–	4	6	–	–	8	–	12	5	8	12	55
7	John de Vries	12	Reynard 91D	Ralt Australia Pty Ltd	4	10	6	2	6	8	2	4	3	–	2	2	49
8	Simon Wills	13 & 31	Reynard 92D	Greg Murphy Racing	–	–	–	–	–	–	3	20	–	–	15	8	46
9	Owen Osborne	34	Reynard 92D	NHP Electrical	–	–	8	–	–	–	6	–	–	3	6	3	26
10	Akihiro Asai	74	Reynard 94D	Chris Hocking	–	–	1	3	8	–	–	6	–	–	3	4	25
11	Les Crampton	15	Reynard 91D	Sun Wipes Formula Racing Team	–	12	3	–	–	2	–	–	4	1	–	–	22
12	Dale Brede	27	Ralt RT23	National Capital Motors	–	6	–	–	–		4	8	1	1.5	–	–	20.5
13	Chas Jacobsen	87	Reynard 92D	Chas Jacobsen	–	–	2	4	–	4	1	3	–	–	–	–	14
14	Bob Power	48	Ralt RT23	Robert Power	–	–	–	1	2	6	–	–	–	–	–	1	10
15	Garry Haywood	26	Reynard 90D	Garry Haywood	1	8	–	–	–	–	–	–	–	–	–	–	9
16	Damien Digby	69	Reynard 92D	Damien Digby	–	4	–	–	3	–	–	2	–	–	–	–	9
17	Steve Cramp	21	Reynard 94D	Stephen Cramp	6	2	–	–	–	–	–	–	–	–	–	–	8
18	Craig Bastian	23	Reynard 92D	Chris Hocking	–	–	–	–	–	–	–	1	2	2	1	–	6
19	Paul Stephenson	8	Reynard 91D	Paul Stephenson	3	–	–	–	–	–	–	–	–	–	–	–	3
20	Chas Talbot	14	March 87B	Chas Talbot	–	3	–	–	–	–	–	–	–	–	–	–	3
21	Lars Johansson	36	Reynard 94D	Lautentius Consultants	–	–	–	–	–	3	–	–	–	–	–	–	3
22	Chris Hocking	74	Reynard 94D	Chris Hocking	2	–	–	–	–	–	–	–	–	–	–	–	2
23	Roger Oakeshott	28	Lola T93-50	Barshott Racing	–	–	–	–	–	1	–	–	–	0.5	–	–	1.5
24	Brian Sampson	78	Lola T91/50	Brian Sampson	–	–	–	–	1	–	–	–	–	–	–	–	1

- Formula Holden regulations mandated the use of an approved Holden V6 engine.
- Race 2 of Round 5 at Calder was stopped due to adverse weather and half points were awarded to placegetters.
