= 2009 Supercheap Auto Bathurst 1000 =

Motor race in Australia

Seasons
- ← 2008 2010 →

(New South Wales) 2009 Supercheap Auto Bathurst 1000
Event Information
- Round 10 of 14 in the 2009 V8 Supercar Championship Series
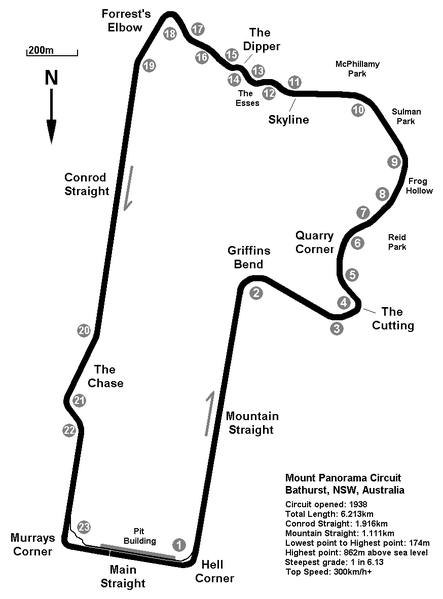
- Date: 8–11 October 2009
- Location: Bathurst, New South Wales
- Venue: Mount Panorama Circuit
- Weather: Started fine with damp track, rained mid-race before clearing by the end

Results
Race 1
| Distance | 161 laps | 1000 km |
| Pole position | Garth Tander; Holden Racing Team | 2:07.9463 |
| Winner | Garth Tander; Will Davison; Holden Racing Team | 6:40:02.4884 |

The 2009 Supercheap Auto Bathurst 1000 was a motor race for V8 Supercars. It was the thirteenth running of the Australian 1000 race, first held after the organisational split over the Bathurst 1000 that occurred in 1997. It is the 52nd race tracing its lineage back to the 1960 Armstrong 500 held at Phillip Island.

The race, which was Race 18 of the 2009 V8 Supercar Championship Series, was held on 11 October 2009 at the Mount Panorama Circuit just outside Bathurst, New South Wales, Australia.

In the buildup to the race, much attention was focussed on defending champions Craig Lowndes and Jamie Whincup who had the chance with this race to become the second and third drivers to win the race four years in succession, a feat only ever achieved before by Bob Jane in 1964.

The race was won by Garth Tander, who recorded his second victory in the race, and by Will Davison, his scored his first win. It was also the sixth victory in the race for the Holden Racing Team.

== Entry list ==
For the first time since 2004, teams from outside the V8 Supercar Championship Series would be allowed to compete. Three single car teams from the Fujitsu V8 Supercar Series were entered, bringing the entry list up to 32 cars. All six 'wildcard' drivers were debutants, along with Dean Fiore, Troy Bayliss, Ben Collins, Mark McNally, Tim Slade, James Thompson and David Wall. Of the 13 debutants, only Fiore, Assaillit, Douglas, Slade and Wall returned for future races. It was also the last Bathurst 1000 start for both Brad Jones and Leanne Tander.

| No. | Drivers | Team | Car | No. | Drivers | Team | Car |
|---|---|---|---|---|---|---|---|
| 2 | (Australia) Garth Tander (Australia) Will Davison | Holden Racing Team (Holden, Toll) | Holden Commodore (VE) | 21 | (Australia) Damien Assaillit (Australia) Brad Lowe | MW Motorsport (Fujitsu) | Ford Falcon (BF) |
| 3 | (Australia) Jason Bargwanna (Australia) Mark Noske | Tasman Motorsport (EzyGas) | Holden Commodore (VE) | 22 | (Australia) Paul Dumbrell (New Zealand) Craig Baird | Holden Racing Team (Holden, Toll) | Holden Commodore (VE) |
| 4 | (New Zealand) Daniel Gaunt (New Zealand) John McIntyre | Stone Brothers Racing (Irwin Tools, SP Tools) | Ford Falcon (FG) | 23 | (Australia) Sam Walter (Australia) Taz Douglas | Greg Murphy Racing (Roadways Tasmania) | Holden Commodore (VE) |
| 5 | (Australia) Dean Canto (Australia) Luke Youlden | Ford Performance Racing (Orrcon Steel, Castrol) | Ford Falcon (FG) | 24 | (Australia) David Reynolds (United Kingdom) Andy Priaulx | Walkinshaw Racing (Bundaberg Rum: Red) | Holden Commodore (VE) |
| 6 | (Australia) Mark Winterbottom (New Zealand) Steven Richards | Ford Performance Racing (Orrcon Steel, Castrol) | Ford Falcon (FG) | 25 | (Australia) Jason Bright (Australia) Karl Reindler | Britek Motorsport (Fujitsu) | Ford Falcon (FG) |
| 7 | (Australia) Todd Kelly (Australia) Rick Kelly | Kelly Racing (Jack Daniel's) | Holden Commodore (VE) | 33 | (Australia) David Besnard (Australia) Greg Ritter | Garry Rogers Motorsport (Valvoline) | Holden Commodore (VE) |
| 8 | (Australia) Cameron McConville (New Zealand) Jason Richards | Brad Jones Racing (BOC Gas and Gear) | Holden Commodore (VE) | 34 | (Australia) Lee Holdsworth (Australia) Michael Caruso | Garry Rogers Motorsport (Valvoline Zerex) | Holden Commodore (VE) |
| 9 | (New Zealand) Shane van Gisbergen (Australia) Alex Davison | Stone Brothers Racing (Irwin Tools, SP Tools) | Ford Falcon (FG) | 39 | (Australia) Russell Ingall (Australia) Owen Kelly | Paul Morris Motorsport (Supercheap Auto) | Holden Commodore (VE) |
| 10 | (Australia) Steve Owen (Australia) Shane Price | Walkinshaw Racing (Autobarn) | Holden Commodore (VE) | 51 | (New Zealand) Greg Murphy (Australia) Mark Skaife | Tasman Motorsport (Sprint Gas) | Holden Commodore (VE) |
| 12 | (Australia) Dean Fiore (Australia) Troy Bayliss | Triple F Racing (Kitten Car Care) | Holden Commodore (VE) | 55 | (Australia) Tony D'Alberto (Australia) Andrew Thompson | Rod Nash Racing (The Bottle-O) | Holden Commodore (VE) |
| 13 | (Australia) David Sieders (Australia) Andrew Fisher | Sieders Racing Team (Jesus: All About Life) | Ford Falcon (BF) | 67 | (Australia) Tim Slade (Australia) Paul Morris | Paul Morris Motorsport (Supercheap Auto) | Holden Commodore (VE) |
| 14 | (Australia) Andrew Jones (Australia) Brad Jones | Brad Jones Racing (WOW Sight & Sound) | Holden Commodore (VE) | 88 | (Denmark) Allan Simonsen (United Kingdom) James Thompson | Triple Eight Race Engineering (Vodafone) | Ford Falcon (FG) |
| 15 | (Australia) Nathan Pretty (United Kingdom) Ben Collins | Kelly Racing (Jack Daniel's) | Holden Commodore (VE) | 111 | (New Zealand) Fabian Coulthard (Australia) Michael Patrizi | Paul Cruickshank Racing (Wilson Security, McGrath Foundation) | Ford Falcon (FG) |
| 16 | (Australia) Tony Ricciardello (Australia) Mark McNally | Kelly Racing (Hi-Tec Oils) | Holden Commodore (VE) | 247 | (Australia) Jack Perkins (Australia) Dale Wood | Kelly Racing (Bet 24/7) | Holden Commodore (VE) |
| 17 | (Australia) Steven Johnson (Australia) James Courtney | Dick Johnson Racing (Jim Beam) | Ford Falcon (FG) | 333 | (Australia) David Wall (Australia) Leanne Tander | Paul Cruickshank Racing (Wilson Security, McGrath Foundation) | Ford Falcon (BF) |
| 18 | (Australia) Warren Luff (Australia) Jonathon Webb | Dick Johnson Racing (Jim Beam) | Ford Falcon (FG) | 888 | (Australia) Craig Lowndes (Australia) Jamie Whincup | Triple Eight Race Engineering (Vodafone) | Ford Falcon (FG) |

*Entries with a grey background were wildcard entries which did not compete in the full championship season.

=== Driver changes ===
The only change in driver pairings from the 2009 L&H 500 was a swap in the Paul Morris Motorsport team with Owen Kelly moving into the #39 car with Russell Ingall, and Tim Slade joining Paul Morris in the #67 Commodore.

== Practice ==
Practice began on Thursday 8 October 2009. Alex Davison set the fastest time in the first session, a 2:09.7175. The second session saw Jason Richards lead the into the 'Eights' with a 2:08.6080. Jamie Whincup set the fastest time in the final session, quickest for the first day of practice, the defending champion recording a 2:07.3745 to be fastest by the big gap of six-tenths of a second in an ominous sign. Jason Bargwanna was second fastest, the only other driver to lap under 2:08 to be fastest Holden in the Tasman Motorsport Commodore. Steven Johnson was third quickest in the Dick Johnson Racing Falcon ahead of Mark Winterbottom in the Ford Performance Racing Falcon, Jason Richards, Alex Davison, Greg Murphy, Warren Luff completing the fastest two car team in the second Dick Johnson Racing Ford with Jason Bright and Fabian Coulthard completing the top ten.

Friday morning practice saw Lee Holdsworth lead the session, recording a 2:07.7376 ahead of Whincup the only other driver to get into the 'Sevens'. The second Friday morning session saw Steven Johnson record a 2:07.5702 to be fastest with Greg Murphy, Craig Lowndes, Mark Winterbottom, Alex Davison, Garth Tander forging into the Seven bracket. Jason Bright, Todd Kelly Jason Richards and Fabian Coulthard completed the top ten. Michael Caruso was disappointingly 26th. Best of the international drivers was the Anglo-Dane pairing of James Thompson and Allan Simonsen. Best of the driver who were not full-time V8 Supercar drivers was Steve Owen in eleventh.

An accident marred each of the two morning sessions, Andrew Fisher crashing the Sieders Racing Team Ford while in the second session Leanne Tander gave her Ford mainly cosmetic damage. Both cars were repaired for qualifying.

The Saturday morning warm-up session become embroiled in controversy when Mark Winterbottom was blamed for an on-track incident between himself and Sam Walter. Climbing Mountain Straight Winterbottom, weaving his car to warm his tyres, caused the much faster travelling Walter to lose control of his car avoiding the sudden movement of Winterbottom's car, resulting in a crash into the wall. The Greg Murphy Racing Commodore was extensively damaged and Walter suffered a broken toe. In his second fine of the weekend for this offence, Winterbottom was fined $15,000.

== Qualifying ==
Qualifying was held on Friday 9 October 2009. Qualifying was interrupted early when David Reynolds speared off the track at McPhillamy Park Corner before making a mess of the front end of the car against the barriers. Other than that were no surprises from the first qualifying session. The Triple F Racing Commodore of Dean Fiore and Troy Bayliss ended up three seconds slower than the rest of the qualifying field.

In the dying moments of qualifying Jason Richards set the fastest time 2:07.2230 with several leading competitors setting for last-ditch efforts, when Warren Luff spun into the sand trap at Murrays Corner bringing a premature end to qualifying and leaving Richards as the Provisional Pole Position winner.

Garth Tander was second fastest ahead of Lee Holdsworth as Holdens took the top three positions. Mark Winterbottom was the first Ford in fourth while Paul Dumbrell in fifth made Holden Racing Team the best performed team. Craig Lowndes followed with Shane van Gisbergen, Todd Kelly, Greg Murphy and Russell Ingall also progressing to the Top Ten Shootout on Saturday. In a major upset one of the pre-event favourites, the #17 Ford of Steven Johnson and James Courtney missed out, qualifying 13th, their last qualifying lap foiled by their teammates accident at Murrays Corner. Fabian Coulthard also missed the top ten in eleventh ahead of Jason Bright. After Johnson was Luff, who ended up as the fastest part-time V8 Supercar driver, with Jason Bargwanna and Greg Ritter following. Allan Simonsen was again best of the internationals in 17th.

== Top Ten Shootout ==
The Top Ten Shootout was held in damp and cold conditions on Saturday 10 October 2009. First out Russell Ingall was conservative and did not push the car on a drying track after heavy rain struck the earlier support races. Greg Murphy put down a time almost three seconds quicker, but was quickly disqualified for not getting his car in position to start the lap on time. It would have been good enough for seventh position. Todd Kelly was smooth as he could be, Shane van Gisbergen was ragged and fast. Craig Lowndes was six-tenths faster, setting a time that Paul Dumbrell speared off at the Chase trying to match. Mark Winterbottom missed Lowndes by hundredths and Lee Holdsworth was slower again before Garth Tander reeled off the only Seven of the session, a 2:07.9463 to take pole position. Jason Richards tried valiantly, but a couple of small slips dropped him to fifth position.

== Race ==
The race began at 10:30am and the 161 laps were completed by 5:20pm (local time) Sunday 11 October 2009. The race began in wet conditions, Steven Richards won the start but quickly Will Davison climbed into the lead. At the first corner, Jason Bright spun after contact with Cameron McConville. Todd Kelly was the first to stop for slick tyres on lap 4, followed almost immediately by James Courtney. The next group saw Will Davison, Steven Richards and Craig Lowndes pit together. FPR's pitstop was slow and Lowndes leapt passed but there was contact between the two in the pits and Lowndes received a drive-through penalty.

David Sieders stopped at Hell Corner in what was the first retirement. The first round of pitstops began at lap 27 with the order Will Davison, Steven Richards, Courtney, Murphy, Ingall, Coulthard, Alex Davison and Todd Kelly, with Kelly first to pit again. The first front running car to strike trouble was Mark Winterbottom. During Richards' stint in the car the alternator failed and the battery was replaced at the first stop. The replacement battery came loose in the boot and flew across the car, hitting and cracking the refueling pipes causing a leak, then a fire.

Rain returned on lap 77. The second retirement was World Superbike champion Troy Bayliss who spun into the at the Dipper bringing out the safety car with the running order Davison, Murphy, Todd Kelly, Cameron McConville, Lowndes, Alex Davison and Courtney. Rain came again at the restart and Owen Kelly speared into the sand at Murrays Corner. Warren Luff hit the wall at the Dipper and limped back to the pits to retire. Rick Kelly was given the 'meatball' flag for dragging the car's rear undertray, loosened after contact with Warren Luff. Steven Johnson pitted with an engine problem but rejoined and the rash of lap 84 incidents concluded with Sam Walter crashing at Griffins Bend, the same point he had crashed in practice avoiding Mark Winterbottom.

The weather cleared up again soon after, however a safety car at lap 121 after Fabian Coulthard's Falcon stopped climbing Mountain Straight bunched up the field yet again. The running order prior to the safety car had seen David Besnard climb into the lead ahead of Todd Kelly, Murphy, Caruso, Luke Youlden and Tony Ricciardello. Steven Johnson pitted with broken front left corner, but would resume many laps down to collect some points for Johnson's impressive championship points run. The 888 car of Lowndes/Whincup fought back through the field and led the race around lap 130 before encountering a clutch problem after the safety car restart, which saw them drop back as far as fifth as Ritter climbed into the lead in an impressive driver between himself and David Besnard in the second GRM Commodore. The field was subsequently bunched up with several teams struggling to increase their fuel economy in preparation for the last round of pit stops.

Another safety car on lap 141 ruined many of the front-running cars final pit strategies, including Mark Skaife and Greg Ritter and bunched up the field yet again with 20 laps to go. Upon restart on lap 143, the HRT car number 2 of Garth Tander was issued a bad sportsmanship flag for a dangerous blocking incident which enabled them to retain the lead ahead of Rick Kelly in car number 7. On lap 148 the impressive run of Tony Ricciardello slowed with a spin on the restart. Within ten laps the car speared off at the Chase as well. From lap 148 onwards, the second placed car Rick Kelly lacked pace and began holding up Lee Holdsworth, Jason Bargwanna, Jamie Whincup and Jason Richards. Many passing moves followed - notably the move of Bargwanna on Holdsworth on lap 156, and then Whincup coming into contact with Bargwanna the following lap, turning Bargwanna around thus handing Richards third. Greg Murphy was making heaps of time on this group, and moved up to sixth following Bargwanna's spin. This afforded the Tander a lead of around 4.5 seconds by lap 153, despite carrying the same pace to those behind him. Further down the field Allan Simonsen stopped and parked descending the hill, the races final retirement.

A crash at The Cutting for Nathan Pretty on lap 156 failed to bring out the safety car, despite depositing oil, glass and other debris on the track; however, Tony Ricciardello finding the Chase sand-trap on the following lap did, bunching up the field with only a couple of laps remaining. The restart on lap 159 saw a scramble for position behind the second placed Rick Kelly, acting as a buffer for Tander in the lead. Kelly was quickly passed by many of the front runners at the start of lap 160, releasing those caught behind to chase down Tander, with Jason Richards fighting into second to lead the chase however by this time, Tander had enough of a gap to retain the lead until the end of the race.

Lee Holdsworth recovered from an early spin the complete an all Holden podium with Greg Murphy and part-time driver Mark Skaife, finishing fourth (and 0.004 seconds off a podium) ahead of the wounded Falcon of Whincup. Jason Bargwanna finished sixth, Tim Slade finished seventh, and the Kelly brothers finished eighth ahead of the cruelly unrewarded drive of the best all part-time V8 drivers David Besnard and Greg Ritter. Tony D'Alberto and Andrew Thompson completed the top ten. Thirteen cars finished on the lead lap with 24 cars taking the chequer, last on the road James Courtney and Steven Johnson who lost 30 laps over their mechanical problems.

There was a total of eight safety car interventions throughout the race.

== Results ==
=== Qualifying ===
| Pos | No | Name | Car | Team | Leg 2 | Leg 1 |
|---|---|---|---|---|---|---|
| 1 | 8 | (Australia) Cameron McConville (New Zealand) Jason Richards | Holden Commodore (VE) | Brad Jones Racing | 2:07.2230 | |
| 2 | 2 | (Australia) Garth Tander (Australia) Will Davison | Holden Commodore (VE) | Holden Racing Team | 2:07.3030 | |
| 3 | 34 | (Australia) Lee Holdsworth (Australia) Michael Caruso | Holden Commodore (VE) | Garry Rogers Motorsport | 2:07.4366 | |
| 4 | 6 | (Australia) Mark Winterbottom (New Zealand) Steven Richards | Ford Falcon (FG) | Ford Performance Racing | 2:07.4366 | |
| 5 | 22 | (Australia) Paul Dumbrell (New Zealand) Craig Baird | Holden Commodore (VE) | Holden Racing Team | 2:07.5166 | |
| 6 | 888 | (Australia) Craig Lowndes (Australia) Jamie Whincup | Ford Falcon (FG) | Triple Eight Race Engineering | 2:07.5477 | |
| 7 | 9 | (New Zealand) Shane van Gisbergen (Australia) Alex Davison | Ford Falcon (FG) | Stone Brothers Racing | 2:07.6261 | |
| 8 | 7 | (Australia) Todd Kelly (Australia) Rick Kelly | Holden Commodore (VE) | Kelly Racing | 2:07.6651 | |
| 9 | 51 | (New Zealand) Greg Murphy (Australia) Mark Skaife | Holden Commodore (VE) | Tasman Motorsport | 2:07.6908 | |
| 10 | 39 | (Australia) Russell Ingall (Australia) Owen Kelly | Holden Commodore (VE) | Paul Morris Motorsport | 2:07.7211 | |
| 11 | 111 | (New Zealand) Fabian Coulthard (Australia) Michael Patrizi | Ford Falcon (FG) | Paul Cruickshank Racing | 2:07.7849 | |
| 12 | 25 | (Australia) Jason Bright (Australia) Karl Reindler | Ford Falcon (FG) | Britek Motorsport | 2:07.8048 | |
| 13 | 17 | (Australia) Steven Johnson (Australia) James Courtney | Ford Falcon (FG) | Dick Johnson Racing | 2:07.9528 | |
| 14 | 18 | (Australia) Warren Luff (Australia) Jonathon Webb | Ford Falcon (FG) | Dick Johnson Racing | 2:08.0276 | |
| 15 | 3 | (Australia) Jason Bargwanna (Australia) Mark Noske | Holden Commodore (VE) | Tasman Motorsport | 2:08.0319 | |
| 16 | 33 | (Australia) David Besnard (Australia) Greg Ritter | Holden Commodore (VE) | Garry Rogers Motorsport | 2:08.2135 | |
| 17 | 88 | (Denmark) Allan Simonsen (United Kingdom) James Thompson | Ford Falcon (FG) | Triple Eight Race Engineering | 2:08.3859 | |
| 18 | 5 | (Australia) Dean Canto (Australia) Luke Youlden | Ford Falcon (FG) | Ford Performance Racing | 2:08.4119 | |
| 19 | 55 | (Australia) Tony D'Alberto (Australia) Andrew Thompson | Holden Commodore (VE) | Tony D'Alberto Racing | 2:08.4720 | |
| 20 | 10 | (Australia) Steve Owen (Australia) Shane Price | Holden Commodore (VE) | Walkinshaw Racing | 2:08.7417 | |
| 21 | 4 | (New Zealand) Daniel Gaunt (New Zealand) John McIntyre | Ford Falcon (FG) | Stone Brothers Racing | | 2:08.7687 |
| 22 | 14 | (Australia) Andrew Jones (Australia) Brad Jones | Holden Commodore (VE) | Brad Jones Racing | | 2:08.9861 |
| 23 | 247 | (Australia) Jack Perkins (Australia) Dale Wood | Holden Commodore (VE) | Kelly Racing | | 2:09.1775 |
| 24 | 15 | (Australia) Nathan Pretty (United Kingdom) Ben Collins | Holden Commodore (VE) | Kelly Racing | | 2:09.1893 |
| 25 | 24 | (Australia) David Reynolds (United Kingdom) Andy Priaulx | Holden Commodore (VE) | Walkinshaw Racing | | 2:09.2743 |
| 26 | 21 | (Australia) Damian Assaillit (Australia) Brad Lowe | Ford Falcon (BF) | MW Motorsport | | 2:09.3111 |
| 27 | 67 | (Australia) Tim Slade (Australia) Paul Morris | Holden Commodore (VE) | Paul Morris Motorsport | | 2:09.3853 |
| 28 | 16 | (Australia) Tony Ricciardello (Australia) Mark McNally | Holden Commodore (VE) | Kelly Racing | | 2:09.6376 |
| 29 | 333 | (Australia) David Wall (Australia) Leanne Tander | Ford Falcon (BF) | Paul Cruickshank Racing | | 2:10.4151 |
| 30 | 13 | (Australia) David Sieders (Australia) Andrew Fisher | Ford Falcon (BF) | Sieders Racing Team | | 2:10.6107 |
| 31 | 23 | (Australia) Sam Walter (Australia) Taz Douglas | Holden Commodore (VE) | Greg Murphy Racing | | 2:10.6224 |
| 32 | 12 | (Australia) Dean Fiore (Australia) Troy Bayliss | Holden Commodore (VE) | Triple F Racing | | 2:13.3271 |

=== Top ten shootout ===
| Pos | No | Driver | Team | Time |
|---|---|---|---|---|
| Pole | 2 | (Australia) Garth Tander | Holden Racing Team | 2:07.9463 |
| 2 | 888 | (Australia) Craig Lowndes | Triple Eight Race Engineering | 2:08.2231 |
| 3 | 6 | (Australia) Mark Winterbottom | Ford Performance Racing | 2:08.2737 |
| 4 | 34 | (Australia) Lee Holdsworth | Garry Rogers Motorsport | 2:08.4268 |
| 5 | 8 | (New Zealand) Jason Richards | Brad Jones Racing | 2:08.5015 |
| 6 | 9 | (New Zealand) Shane van Gisbergen | Stone Brothers Racing | 2:08.8159 |
| 7 | 7 | (Australia) Todd Kelly | Kelly Racing | 2:09.8986 |
| 8 | 22 | (Australia) Paul Dumbrell | Holden Racing Team | 2:10.1474 |
| 9 | 39 | (Australia) Russell Ingall | Paul Morris Motorsport | 2:12.4565 |
| Exc | 51 | (New Zealand) Greg Murphy | Tasman Motorsport | 2:09.7742 |

=== Starting grid ===
The following table represents the final starting grid for the race on Sunday:

| Inside row | | | Outside row | | |
|---|---|---|---|---|---|
| 1 | (Australia) Garth Tander (Australia) Will Davison | 2 | 888 | (Australia) Craig Lowndes (Australia) Jamie Whincup | 2 |
| 1 | Holden Racing Team (Holden Commodore (VE)) | | Triple Eight Race Engineering (Ford Falcon (FG)) | | 2 |
| 3 | (New Zealand) Steven Richards (Australia) Mark Winterbottom | 6 | 34 | (Australia) Michael Caruso (Australia) Lee Holdsworth | 4 |
| 3 | Ford Performance Racing (Ford Falcon (FG)) | | Garry Rogers Motorsport (Holden Commodore (VE)) | | 4 |
| 5 | (New Zealand) Jason Richards (Australia) Cameron McConville | 8 | 9 | (New Zealand) Shane van Gisbergen (Australia) Alex Davison | 6 |
| 5 | Brad Jones Racing (Holden Commodore (VE)) | | Stone Brothers Racing (Ford Falcon (FG)) | | 6 |
| 7 | (Australia) Todd Kelly (Australia) Rick Kelly | 7 | 22 | (Australia) Paul Dumbrell (New Zealand) Craig Baird | 8 |
| 7 | Kelly Racing (Holden Commodore (VE)) | | Holden Racing Team (Holden Commodore (VE)) | | 8 |
| 9 | (Australia) Russell Ingall (Australia) Owen Kelly | 39 | 51 | (New Zealand) Greg Murphy (Australia) Mark Skaife | 10 |
| 9 | Paul Morris Motorsport (Holden Commodore (VE)) | | Tasman Motorsport (Holden Commodore (VE)) | | 10 |
| 11 | (New Zealand) Fabian Coulthard (Australia) Michael Patrizi | 111 | 25 | (Australia) Jason Bright (Australia) Karl Reindler | 12 |
| 11 | Paul Cruickshank Racing (Ford Falcon (FG)) | | Britek Motorsport (Ford Falcon (FG)) | | 12 |
| 13 | (Australia) Steven Johnson (Australia) James Courtney | 17 | 18 | (Australia) Warren Luff (Australia) Jonathon Webb | 14 |
| 13 | Dick Johnson Racing (Ford Falcon (FG)) | | Dick Johnson Racing (Ford Falcon (FG)) | | 14 |
| 15 | (Australia) Jason Bargwanna (Australia) Mark Noske | 3 | 33 | (Australia) David Besnard (Australia) Greg Ritter | 16 |
| 15 | Tasman Motorsport (Holden Commodore (VE)) | | Garry Rogers Motorsport (Holden Commodore (VE)) | | 16 |
| 17 | (Denmark) Allan Simonsen (United Kingdom) James Thompson | 88 | 5 | (Australia) Dean Canto (Australia) Luke Youlden | 18 |
| 17 | Triple Eight Race Engineering (Ford Falcon (FG)) | | Ford Performance Racing (Ford Falcon (FG)) | | 18 |
| 19 | (Australia) Tony D'Alberto (Australia) Andrew Thompson | 55 | 10 | (Australia) Steve Owen (Australia) Shane Price | 20 |
| 19 | Rod Nash Racing (Holden Commodore (VE)) | | Walkinshaw Racing (Holden Commodore (VE)) | | 20 |
| 21 | (New Zealand) Daniel Gaunt (New Zealand) John McIntyre | 4 | 14 | (Australia) Andrew Jones (Australia) Brad Jones | 22 |
| 21 | Stone Brothers Racing (Ford Falcon (FG)) | | Brad Jones Racing (Holden Commodore (VE)) | | 22 |
| 23 | (Australia) Jack Perkins (Australia) Dale Wood | 247 | 15 | (Australia) Nathan Pretty (United Kingdom) Ben Collins | 24 |
| 23 | Kelly Racing (Holden Commodore (VE)) | | Kelly Racing (Holden Commodore (VE)) | | 24 |
| 25 | (Australia) David Reynolds (United Kingdom) Andy Priaulx | 24 | 21 | (Australia) Damian Assaillit (Australia) Brad Lowe | 26 |
| 25 | Walkinshaw Racing (Holden Commodore (VE)) | | MW Motorsport (Ford Falcon (BF)) | | 26 |
| 27 | (Australia) Tim Slade (Australia) Paul Morris | 67 | 16 | (Australia) Tony Ricciardello (Australia) Mark McNally | 28 |
| 27 | Paul Morris Motorsport (Holden Commodore (VE)) | | Kelly Racing (Holden Commodore (VE)) | | 28 |
| 29 | (Australia) David Wall (Australia) Leanne Tander | 333 | 13 | (Australia) David Sieders (Australia) Andrew Fisher | 30 |
| 29 | Paul Cruickshank Racing (Ford Falcon (FG)) | | Sieders Racing Team (Ford Falcon (BF)) | | 30 |
| 31 | (Australia) Taz Douglas (Australia) Sam Walter | 23 | 12 | (Australia) Dean Fiore (Australia) Troy Bayliss | 32 |
| 31 | Greg Murphy Racing (Holden Commodore (VE)) | | Triple F Racing (Holden Commodore (VE)) | | 32 |

=== Race ===
| Pos | No | Driver | Team | Car | Laps | Time/Retired | Grid | Points |
|---|---|---|---|---|---|---|---|---|
| 1 | 2 | (Australia) Garth Tander (Australia) Will Davison | Holden Racing Team | Holden Commodore (VE) | 161 | 6:40:02.4884 | 1 | 300 |
| 2 | 8 | (New Zealand) Jason Richards (Australia) Cameron McConville | Brad Jones Racing | Holden Commodore (VE) | 161 | +0.7599 | 5 | 276 |
| 3 | 34 | (Australia) Lee Holdsworth (Australia) Michael Caruso | Garry Rogers Motorsport | Holden Commodore (VE) | 161 | +3.3842 | 4 | 258 |
| 4 | 51 | (New Zealand) Greg Murphy (Australia) Mark Skaife | Tasman Motorsport | Holden Commodore (VE) | 161 | +3.3884 | 10 | 240 |
| 5 | 888 | (Australia) Craig Lowndes (Australia) Jamie Whincup | Triple Eight Race Engineering | Ford Falcon (FG) | 161 | +4.6582 | 2 | 222 |
| 6 | 3 | (Australia) Jason Bargwanna (Australia) Mark Noske | Tasman Motorsport | Holden Commodore (VE) | 161 | +5.9490 | 15 | 204 |
| 7 | 67 | (Australia) Tim Slade (Australia) Paul Morris | Paul Morris Motorsport | Holden Commodore (VE) | 161 | +8.0320 | 27 | 192 |
| 8 | 7 | (Australia) Todd Kelly (Australia) Rick Kelly | Kelly Racing | Holden Commodore (VE) | 161 | +10.3412 | 7 | 180 |
| 9 | 33 | (Australia) David Besnard (Australia) Greg Ritter | Garry Rogers Motorsport | Holden Commodore (VE) | 161 | +10.4702 | 16 | 168 |
| 10 | 55 | (Australia) Tony D'Alberto (Australia) Andrew Thompson | Rod Nash Racing | Holden Commodore (VE) | 161 | +10.7202 | 19 | 156 |
| 11 | 25 | (Australia) Jason Bright (Australia) Karl Reindler | Britek Motorsport | Ford Falcon (FG) | 161 | +12.7196 | 12 | 144 |
| 12 | 24 | (Australia) David Reynolds (United Kingdom) Andy Priaulx | Walkinshaw Racing | Holden Commodore (VE) | 161 | +12.8611 | 25 | 138 |
| 13 | 9 | (New Zealand) Shane van Gisbergen (Australia) Alex Davison | Stone Brothers Racing | Ford Falcon (FG) | 161 | +1:09.2833 | 6 | 132 |
| 14 | 247 | (Australia) Jack Perkins (Australia) Dale Wood | Kelly Racing | Holden Commodore (VE) | 160 | + 1 lap | 23 | 126 |
| 15 | 39 | (Australia) Russell Ingall (Australia) Owen Kelly | Paul Morris Motorsport | Holden Commodore (VE) | 160 | + 1 lap | 9 | 120 |
| 16 | 10 | (Australia) Steve Owen (Australia) Shane Price | Walkinshaw Racing | Holden Commodore (VE) | 160 | + 1 lap | 20 | 114 |
| 17 | 16 | (Australia) Tony Ricciardello (Australia) Mark McNally | Kelly Racing | Holden Commodore (VE) | 160 | + 1 lap | 28 | 108 |
| 18 | 333 | (Australia) David Wall (Australia) Leanne Tander | Paul Cruickshank Racing | Ford Falcon (FG) | 160 | + 1 lap | 29 | 102 |
| 19 | 4 | (New Zealand) Daniel Gaunt (New Zealand) John McIntyre | Stone Brothers Racing | Ford Falcon (FG) | 160 | + 1 lap | 21 | 96 |
| 20 | 15 | (Australia) Nathan Pretty (United Kingdom) Ben Collins | Kelly Racing | Holden Commodore (VE) | 156 | + 5 laps | 24 | 90 |
| 21 | 22 | (Australia) Paul Dumbrell (New Zealand) Craig Baird | Holden Racing Team | Holden Commodore (VE) | 153 | + 8 laps | 8 | 84 |
| 22 | 21 | (Australia) Damian Assaillit (Australia) Brad Lowe | MW Motorsport | Ford Falcon (BF) | 151 | + 10 laps | 26 | 78 |
| 23 | 14 | (Australia) Andrew Jones (Australia) Brad Jones | Brad Jones Racing | Holden Commodore (VE) | 145 | + 16 laps | 22 | 72 |
| 24 | 17 | (Australia) Steven Johnson (Australia) James Courtney | Dick Johnson Racing | Ford Falcon (FG) | 131 | + 30 laps | 13 | 66 |
| DNF | 88 | (Denmark) Allan Simonsen (United Kingdom) James Thompson | Triple Eight Race Engineering | Ford Falcon (FG) | 152 | Engine | 17 | |
| DNF | 5 | (Australia) Dean Canto (Australia) Luke Youlden | Ford Performance Racing | Ford Falcon (FG) | 139 | Accident | 18 | |
| DNF | 111 | (New Zealand) Fabian Coulthard (Australia) Michael Patrizi | Paul Cruickshank Racing | Ford Falcon (FG) | 120 | Tailshaft | 11 | |
| DNF | 18 | (Australia) Warren Luff (Australia) Jonathon Webb | Dick Johnson Racing | Ford Falcon (FG) | 84 | Accident | 14 | |
| DNF | 23 | (Australia) Sam Walter (Australia) Taz Douglas | Greg Murphy Racing | Holden Commodore (VE) | 84 | Accident | 31 | |
| DNF | 12 | (Australia) Dean Fiore (Australia) Troy Bayliss | Triple F Racing | Holden Commodore (VE) | 59 | Accident | 32 | |
| DNF | 6 | (Australia) Mark Winterbottom (New Zealand) Steven Richards | Ford Performance Racing | Ford Falcon (FG) | 49 | Fire | 3 | |
| DNF | 13 | (Australia) David Sieders (Australia) Andrew Fisher | Sieders Racing Team | Ford Falcon (BF) | 22 | Engine | 30 | |

=== Statistics ===
- Provisional pole position: #8 Jason Richards - 2:07.2230
- Pole position: #2 Garth Tander - 2:07.9463
- Fastest race lap: #8 Jason Richards - 2:08.9972

== Standings ==
After Race 18 of 26 races, the standings in the 2009 V8 Supercar Championship Series were as follows:

| Pos | No | Name | Team | Points |
|---|---|---|---|---|
| 1 | 1 | Jamie Whincup | Triple Eight Race Engineering | 2475 |
| 2 | 22 | Will Davison | Holden Racing Team | 2382 |
| 3 | 2 | Garth Tander | Holden Racing Team | 2037 |
| 4 | 888 | Craig Lowndes | Triple Eight Race Engineering | 1946 |
| 5 | 17 | Steven Johnson | Dick Johnson Racing | 1656 |

== Broadcast ==
The race was covered by the Seven Network for the third consecutive season.

Seven Network
Booth: Neil Crompton, Aaron Noonan, Matthew White
Pit-lane: Mark Beretta, Grant Denyer, Briony Ingerson, Mark Larkham
