= 1985 Australian Formula 2 Championship =

The 1986 Australian Formula 2 Championship was a CAMS sanctioned Australian motor racing title open to cars complying with Australian Formula 2 regulations. The title, which was the 18th Australian Formula 2 Championship, was won by Peter Glover, driving a Cheetah Mk.8 Volkswagen.

== Calendar ==
The championship was contested over a nine round series.

Round	Circuit	State	Date	Format	Round winner	Car
1	Winton	Victoria	10 February	Two heats	Peter Glover	Cheetah Mk 8 Volkswagen
2	Sandown Park	Victoria	24 February	Two heats	Peter Glover	Cheetah Mk 8 Volkswagen
3	Lakeside	Queensland	24 March	One race	Peter Macrow	Cheetah Mk 8 Volkswagen
4	Amaroo Park	New South Wales	7 April	One race	Peter Glover	Cheetah Mk 8 Volkswagen
5	Calder	Victoria	28 April	One race	Peter Glover	Cheetah Mk 8 Volkswagen
6	Baskerville	Tasmania	12 May	Two heats	Mark McLaughlan	Elfin 852 Volkswagen
7	Mallala	South Australia	2 June	Two heats	Peter Glover	Cheetah Mk 8 Volkswagen
8	Adelaide International Raceway	South Australia	30 June	One race	Peter Glover	Cheetah Mk 8 Volkswagen
9	Oran Park	New South Wales	14 July	One race	Peter Glover	Cheetah Mk 8 Volkswagen

== Points system ==
Points were awarded to the first 20 placegetters in each race as per the following table:

Race position	1st	2nd	3rd	4th	5th	6th	7th	8th	9th	10th	11th	12th	13th	14th	15th	16th	17th	18th	19th	20th
Points	30	27	24	21	19	17	15	14	13	12	11	10	9	8	7	6	5	4	3	2

- Where a round was contested over multiple heats, each driver's points were aggregated and then divided by the number of heats to determine the championship points allocation for that round.
- Only the best eight round results counted towards a driver's total.

== Championship results ==
Position	Driver	No.	Car	Entrant	Win	San	Lak	Ama	Cal	Bas	Mal	Ade	Ora	Total
1	Peter Glover	1	Cheetah Mk 8 Volkswagen	Peter Glover	30	28.5	27	30	30	-	30	30	30	235.5
2	Peter Macrow	25	Cheetah Mk 8 Volkswagen	Peter Macrow	25.5	28.5	30	27	27	-	27	27	27	219
3	Grahame Blee	2	Cheetah Mk 6 Toyota	Grahame Blee	13	15	17	17	-	10.5	14	14	15	115.5
4	Mark Potter	5	Elfin 700 Ford	Mark Potter	-	6	-	11	15	20	13.5	15	24	104.5
5	Arthur Abrahams	19	Cheetah Mk 6 Volkswagen & Cheetah Mk 8 Volkswagen	Arthur Abrahams	-	10.5	-	-	21	-	21	21	21	94.5
6	Bob Power	8	Ralt RT3 Volkswagen	Bob Power	10.5	20	24	7	-	-	-	-	14	75.5
7	Craig Sparks	33	Richards 201 Volkswagen	Craig Sparks	15.5	-	21	19	-	-	-	17	-	72.5
8	Mark McLaughlan	9	Elfin 852 Volkswagen	Elfin Sports Cars	-	16.5	-	-	-	30	24	-	-	70.5
9	Derek Pingle	6 & 5	Cheetah Mk 8 Volkswagen	Derek Pingle	-	18	-	21	-	-	-	19	-	58
10	Rob Newman	26	Cheetah Mk 7 Toyota	Rob Newman	-	-	-	-	19	-	15	13	-	47

Note: The above table lists only the top ten championship positions.
