= 1979 Australian Formula 2 Championship =

The 1979 Australian Formula 2 Championship was a CAMS sanctioned Australian motor racing title open to racing cars complying with Australian Formula 2. It was the 12th Australian Formula 2 Championship. The title was won by Brian Shead driving a Cheetah Mk. 6 Toyota.

== Calendar ==
The championship was contested over a three-round series.

Round	Circuit	Date	Format	Winning driver	Car
1	Calder	5 August	One race	John Bowe	Elfin 792 Volkswagen
2	Winton	19 August	One race	Graham Engel	Cheetah Ford
3	Symmons Plains	11 November	Two heats	Brian Shead	Cheetah Mk. 6 Toyota

== Points system ==
Championship points were awarded on a 9-6-4-3-2-1 basis to the top six placegetters at each round.

For the round which was contested over two heats, round placings were determined by allocating points on a 20-16-13-11-10-9-8-7-6-5-4-3-2-1 basis to the top 14 finishers in each race. Championship points were then awarded based on the round results.

== Championship results ==
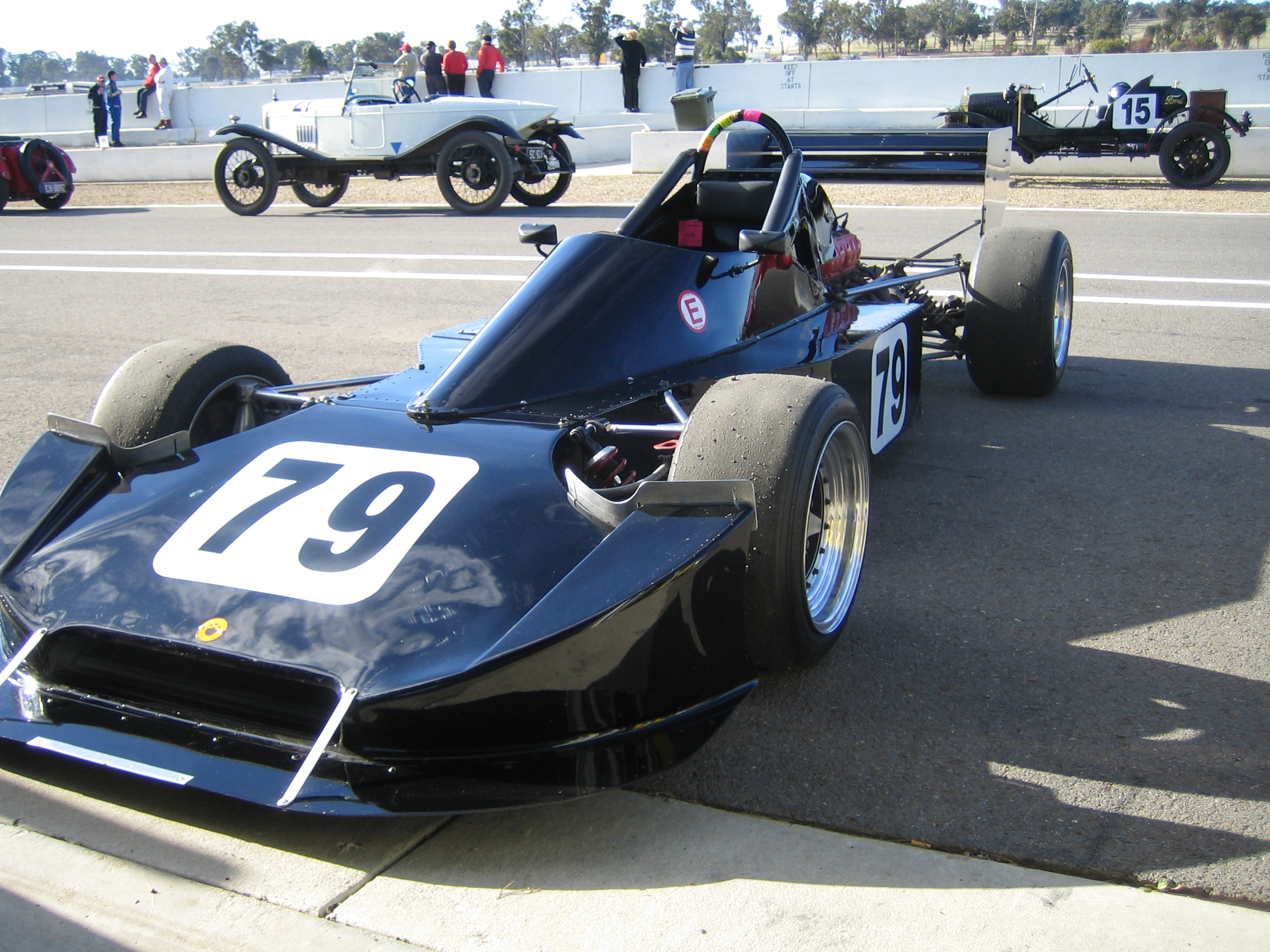
Brain Shead won the championship driving a Cheetah Mk. 6, similar to that pictured above

Position	Driver	Car	Entrant	Calder	Winton	Symmons	Total
1	Brian Shead	Cheetah Mk. 6 Toyota	Speco-VHT Motor Products	6	3	9	18
2	John Bowe	Elfin 792 Volkswagen	Ansett Team Elfin	9	-	6	15
3	Graham Engel	Cheetah Ford	Graham Engel	1	9	-	10
4	Ron Trim	Rennmax Ford	Maitland Insurances	-	6	-	6
5	John Smith	Ralt Ford	Mr Juicy	4	-	-	4
=	Tom Crozier	Cheetah Toyota	Tom Crozier	-	4	-	4
=	Bob Prendegast	Cheetah Toyota	Rugolo Motor Body Works	-	1	3	4
=	Ian Richards	Cheetah Volkswagen	Ian Richards	-	-	4	4
9	Brian Sampson	Cheetah Toyota	Speco VHT	3	-	-	3
10	Peter Macrow	Cheetah Toyota	Peter Macrow	2	-	-	2
=	Ian Carrig	CRD Ford	Ian Carrig	-	2	-	2
=	Geoff Forsyth	Cheetah Toyota	Forsyth Twins Racing	-	-	2	2
13	Greg Taylor	Elfin 600B Ford	AG Taylor	-	-	1	1
