= 1982 Australian Formula 2 Championship =

Motor racing championship

The 1982 Australian Formula 2 Championship was a CAMS sanctioned Australian motor racing title open to cars complying with Australian Formula 2. The title, which was the 15th Australian Formula 2 Championship, was won by Lucio Cesario driving a Ralt RT3 Volkswagen.

== Calendar ==
The championship was contested over a five round series.

Round	Race	Circuit	State	Date	Format	Round winner	Car
1	Solo Lemon Trophy	Sandown Park	Victoria	14 February	Two heats	Peter Macrow	Cheetah Mk7 Holden
2		Winton	Victoria	28 March	Two heats	Lucio Cesario	Ralt RT3 Volkswagen
3		Oran Park	New South Wales	6 June	Two heats	Lucio Cesario	Ralt RT3 Volkswagen
4		Calder Raceway	Victoria	1 August	Two heats	Lucio Cesario	Ralt RT3 Volkswagen
5	Coca-Cola Plate	Adelaide International Raceway	South Australia	26 September	One race	Peter Macrow	Cheetah Mk7 Holden

== Points system ==
Championship points were awarded on a 9-6-4-3-2-1 basis to the top six placegetters in each round.

Where rounds were contested over two heats, points were allocated on a 20-16-13-11-10-9-8-7-6-5-4-3-2-1 basis for the first 14 positions in each race. These points were then aggregated to determine the first six round positions for the purpose of championship points allocation.

== Championship results ==
Position	Driver	No.	Car	Entrant	San	Win	Ora	Cal	Ade	Total
1	Lucio Cesario	16	Ralt RT3 Volkswagen	Formula One Automotive	3	9	9	9	-	30
2	Peter Macrow	25	Cheetah Mk7 Holden	Peter Macrow	9	1	4	6	9	29
3	Greg Ferrall	8	Elfin GE Two 25 Volkswagen	Beasley Solar	6	-	-	4	2	12
3	Robert Power	79	Kaditcha A80B Volkswagen	Robert Power	-	6	6	-	-	12
5	Peter Glover	13	Cheetah Mk7 Holden	Peter Glover	-	4	-	-	6	10
6	David Cooper	6	Elfin 700 GE Volkswagen	David Cooper	2	-	3	3	-	8
7	Chris Kane	5	Arbyen Volkswagen	Chris Kane	-	-	2	-	4	6
8	Grahame Blee	2	Cheetah Mk6GE Toyota	Bell Street Truck Centre	-	-	-	1	3	4
8	Graeme Smith	15	Biranna 274 Ford	Graeme Smith	4	-	-	-	-	4
10	Peter Beehag	74	Cheetah Mk7 Volkswagen	Peter Beehag	1	-	-	2	-	3
10	Hugh Gartley	44	Cheetah Mk7 Toyota	Hugh Gartley	-	2	1	-	-	3
10	Brian Sampson		Cheetah Mk6 Toyota		-	3	-	-	-	3
13	Ian Richards	11	Richards 201 Volkswagen	Ian Richards	-	-	-	-	1	1
