= 1980 Australian Formula 2 Championship =

The 1980 Australian Formula 2 Championship was an Australian motor racing competition for Australian Formula 2 cars. The championship was authorised by the Confederation of Australian Motor Sport (CAMS) as an Australian National Title. It was the 13th Australian Formula 2 Championship.

The championship was won by Richard Davison driving a Hardman Ford.

== Schedule ==
The championship was contested over a four-round series.

Rd.	Circuit	Date	Format	Winning driver	Car
1	Winton Motor Raceway	2 March	Two heats	Graham Engel	Cheetah Mk6 Ford
2	Amaroo Park	25 May	One Race	John Smith	Ralt RT1 Ford
3	Calder Raceway	3 August	Two heats	Richard Davison	Hardman JH1 Ford
4	Sandown Park	14 December	Two heats	John Bowe	Elfin Two-25 Volkswagen

== Points system ==
Championship points were awarded on a 9-6-4-3-2-1 basis to the top six placegetters at each round. For those rounds at which two races were held, round placings were determined by awarding round points on a 20-16-13-11-10-9-8-7-6-5-4-3-2-1 basis to the top 14 finishers in each race.

== Results ==
Position	Driver	No	Car	Entrant	Win.	Ama.	Cal.	San.	Total
1	Richard Davison	6	Hardman JH1 Ford	Paragon Shoes	-	-	9	6	15
2	John Smith	71	Ralt RT1 Ford	John Smith	-	9	2	1	12
3	Peter Macrow	25	Cheetah Mk7 Toyota	Brian Shead	3	4	-	4	11
4	Graham Engel	3	Cheetah Mk6 Ford	G. Engel	9	-	-	-	9
=	John Bowe	33	Elfin Two-25 Volkswagen	Ansett Team Elfin	-	-	-	9	9
=	Russell Norden	5	Arbyen Volkswagen	Bonds Coats Patons Group	-	3	6	-	9
7	Terry Finnigan	7	Elfin Volkswagen	Terry Finnigan	6	-	-	-	6
=	Peter Larner	83	Elfin Ford	Allin Robbins	-	6	-	-	6
=	Colin Jack	13	Birrana 274 Ford	Paul Liston	-	2	4	-	6
10	Brian Shead	58	Cheetah Mk7 Toyota	Speco Motor Improvements	4	-	-	-	4
11	David Cooper	97	Elfin Volkswagen	D. Cooper	-	-	3	-	3
=	Andrew Newton		Hardman Ford	Clive Millis	-	-	-	3	3
=	Tom Crozier	21	Cheetah Mk7 Toyota	Tameino Kieron Pty Ltd		-	1	2	3
14	Ian Richards	11	Cheetah Mk6 Volkswagen	Magnum Wheels	2	-	-	-	2
15	Bob Prendergast	40	Cheetah Mk6 Volkswagen	Prinz Australia	1	-	-	-	1
=	Bob Power	79	Kaditcha Ford	B. Power	-	1	-	-	1
