= 1983 Australian Formula 2 Championship =

The 1983 Australian Formula 2 Championship was an Australian motor racing competition for cars complying with Australian Formula 2 regulations. The championship was authorised by the Confederation of Australian Motor Sport as an Australian National Title. It was the 16th Australian Formula 2 Championship.

South Australian driver Ian Richards won the championship in his self-designed Richards 201 Volkswagen. Richards won by a single point from Peter Glover who drove a Cheetah Mk 7D Isuzu and a borrowed Cheetah Mk 7 Toyota. Finishing equal third on 11 points each were David Crabtree driving a Cheetah Mk 6 BMW, and Greg Ferrall driving an Elfin GE Two-25 Volkswagen.

== Calendar ==
The championship was contested over four rounds.

| Round | Name | Circuit | State | Date | Format | Winning driver | Car |
| 1 | | Oran Park | New South Wales | 20 March | Two Heats | Peter Glover | Cheetah Mk 7D Isuzu |
| 2 | | Winton | Victoria | 27 March | Two Heats | Ian Richards | Richards 201 Volkswagen |
| 3 | | Sandown | Victoria | 17 April | Two Heats | Ian Richards | Richards 201 Volkswagen |
| 4 | General Credits Cup | Adelaide International Raceway | South Australia | 1 May | One race | Peter Glover | Cheetah Toyota |

== Points system ==
Championship points were awarded on a 9-6-4-3-2-1 basis to the top six placegetters at each round.

Where a round was contested over two parts, points were allocated on a 20, 16, 13, 11, 10, 9, 8, 7, 6, 5, 4, 6, 2, 1 basis to the first 14 placegetters in each part. The points for each driver were then aggregated to determine the top six placegetters for the round with the championship points awarded to these drivers.

== Championship standings ==
| Position | Driver | No. | Car | Entrant | Ora. | Win. | San. | Ade. | Total |
|---|---|---|---|---|---|---|---|---|---|
| 1 | Ian Richards | 11 | Richards 201 Volkswagen | Ian Richards | 2 | 9 | 9 | 6 | 26 |
| 2 | Peter Glover | 13 | Cheetah Mk 7D Isuzu; Cheetah Mk 7 Toyota | Peter Glover | 9 | 6 | 1 | 9 | 25 |
| 3 | David Crabtree | 15 & 77 | Cheetah Mk 6 BMW | David Crabtree | 6 | 4 | - | 1 | 11 |
| 3 | Greg Ferrall | 8 | Elfin GE Two-25 Volkswagen | Beasley Solar | 1 | - | 6 | 4 | 11 |
| 5 | Grahame Blee | 2 | Cheetah Mk 6GE Toyota | Bell Street Truck Centre | - | 3 | 4 | - | 7 |
| 6 | Hugh Gartley | 44 | Cheetah Mk 7 Toyota | Hugh Gartley | 3 | 2 | - | - | 5 |
| 7 | Peter Larner | 83 | Hardman JH1 Isuzu | | 4 | - | - | - | 4 |
| 8 | Peter Boylan | 60 | Ralt RT3 Volkswagen | Peter Boylan | - | - | 2 | 2 | 4 |
| 9 | Craig Sparks | 33 | Elfin 792 Volkswagen | Craig Sparks | - | - | 3 | - | 3 |
| 9 | Brian Sampson | 78 | Cheetah Mk 8 Ford | Speco Thomas | - | - | - | 3 | 3 |
| 11 | Steve Swain | 3 | Hardman JH1 Ford | | - | 1 | - | - | 1 |
