= Mallala Motor Sport Park =

Motor racing circuit in Mallala, South Australia

- Full Circuit (1964–1971, 1980–present)
- Location: Mallala, South Australia
- Coordinates: 34°24′54″S 138°30′17″E
- Owner: Peregrine Corporation (February 2017–present); Clem Smith (1977–2017); Keith Williams (1971–1976)
- Operator: Peregrine Corporation (May 2017–present)
- Opened: 19 August 1961; 65 years ago Re-opened: 1980
- Closed: 1971
- Former names: Mallala Race Circuit (1961–1971)
- Major events: Future: Super2 Series (2000–2006, 2027); Former: Australian Formula Ford Championship (1985–1986, 1989–1998, 2000–2006, 2014); Australian Grand Prix (1961); Australian Superbike Championship (1990–2009); Australian Drivers' Championship (1961–1971, 1988–1991, 1994–1997, 2000–2008, 2010, 2017); Australian Tourist Trophy (1962, 1968); Australian Touring Car Championship (1963, 1969–1971, 1989–1998); Australian GT (2006)

Full Circuit (1964–1971, 1980–present)
- Length: 2.601 km (1.616 mi)
- Turns: 9
- Race lap record: 1:02.570 ( (Australia) Paul Stokell, Reynard 90D, 1994, Formula Brabham)

Original Circuit (1961–1963)
- Length: 3.379 km (2.100 mi)
- Turns: 11
- Race lap record: 1:44.000 ( (Australia) Bill Patterson/Lex Davison (Note: Both drivers took the same lap time independently on the same race.), Cooper T51, 1961, Formula Libre)

Mallala Motor Sport Park is a 2.601 km (1.616 mi) bitumen motor racing circuit near the town of Mallala in South Australia, 55 km (34 mi) north of the state capital, Adelaide.

== Mallala Race Circuit (1961–1971) ==
The Mallala Race Circuit, as it was originally known, was established on the site of the former RAAF Base Mallala. The land was purchased from the Royal Australian Air Force at public auction in 1961 by a group of enthusiasts seeking to create a replacement for the Port Wakefield Circuit. South Australia had been allocated the 1961 Australian Grand Prix on the state by state rotational system that applied at that time, but the organisers had subsequently been informed by the Confederation of Australian Motor Sport (CAMS) that the 2.092 km (1.300 mi) Port Wakefield Circuit, which had hosted the 1955 Australian Grand Prix, was no longer suitable to host the event.

The opening meeting for the new venue was held on 19 August 1961 with Bib Stillwell winning the main event in a Cooper Climax. The 1961 Australian Grand Prix headlined the circuits second meeting with Lex Davison winning his fourth and last AGP driving a Cooper T51 Coventry Climax FPF. The original lap distance of 3.379 km (2.100 mi) was reduced to 2.601 km (1.616 mi) in late 1964 when Bosch Curve was moved closer to the Dunlop Curve Grandstand, thus removing the north eastern leg of the circuit.

Mallala served as South Australia's home of motor sport throughout the sixties and it hosted a round of the Australian Drivers' Championship each year from 1961 to 1971. The Australian Tourist Trophy was held there in 1962 and 1968 and the single race Australian Touring Car Championship was staged in 1963, as were annual rounds of the same championship after it changed to a series format in 1969. In 1971 the property was bought by Keith Williams who at the time owned the Surfers Paradise International Raceway, and was constructing the new Adelaide International Raceway. Mallala was closed in that year as Williams had a court ordered covenant placed on the property preventing any motor sport activities. This ensured that Adelaide International would become the new home of motor racing in SA.

== Test Track ==
After the circuit's closure as a motor racing venue, Chrysler Australia, who had their manufacturing base in Adelaide, continued using the Mallala as their test track. Leading race drivers Leo and Pete Geoghegan, who were factory backed Chrysler drivers in Series Production racing, often tested vehicles such as the Chrysler Valiant Charger at the circuit. Mallala was also the test track for the Adelaide-based Elfin Sports Cars run by company founder Garrie Cooper. Elfin produced a variety of sports and Open-wheel race cars.

== Mallala Motor Sport Park (1980–present) ==
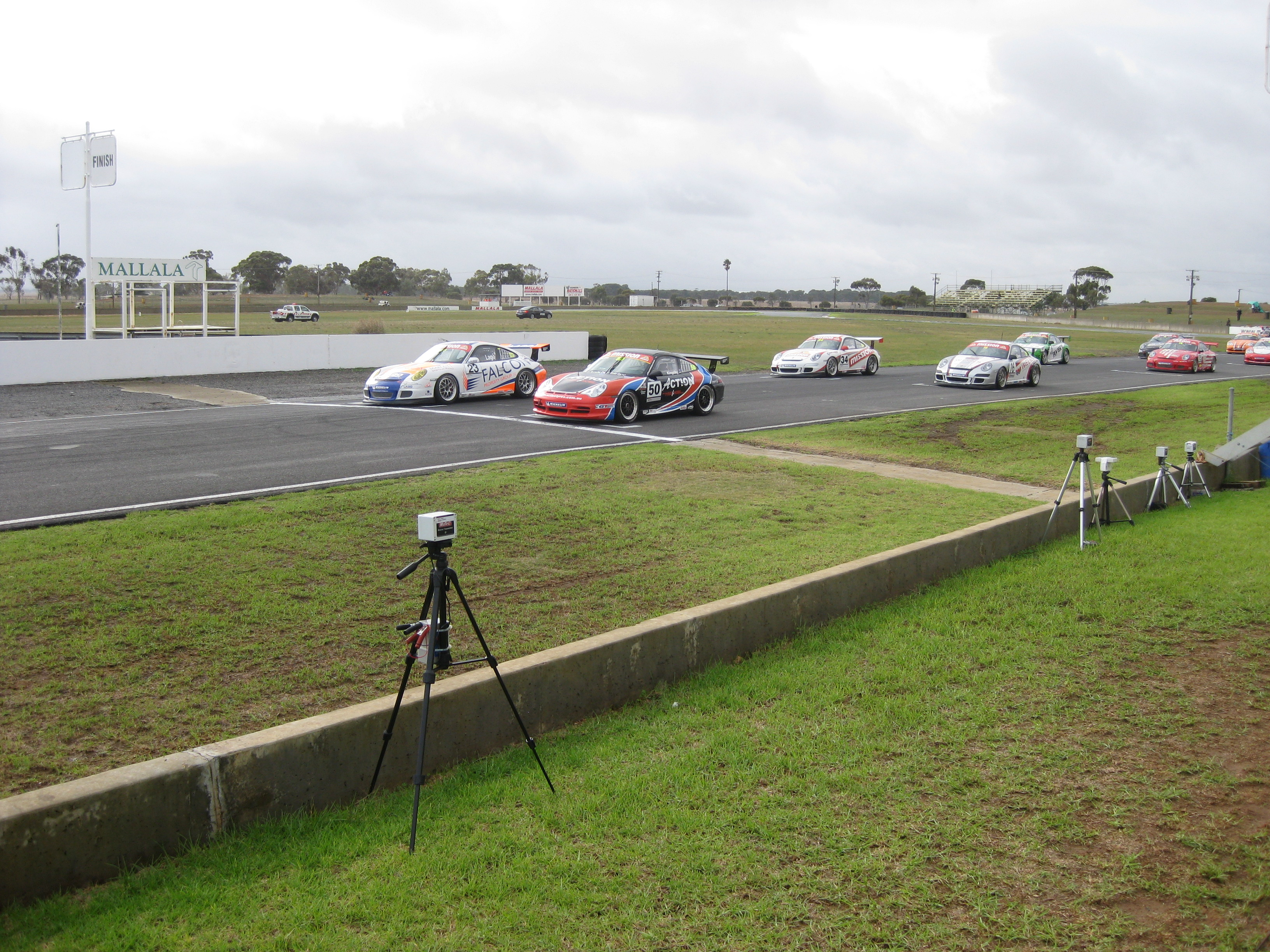
Competitors in the 2010 Porsche GT3 Cup Challenge Series on the grid at Mallala Motor Sport Park on 30 May 2010

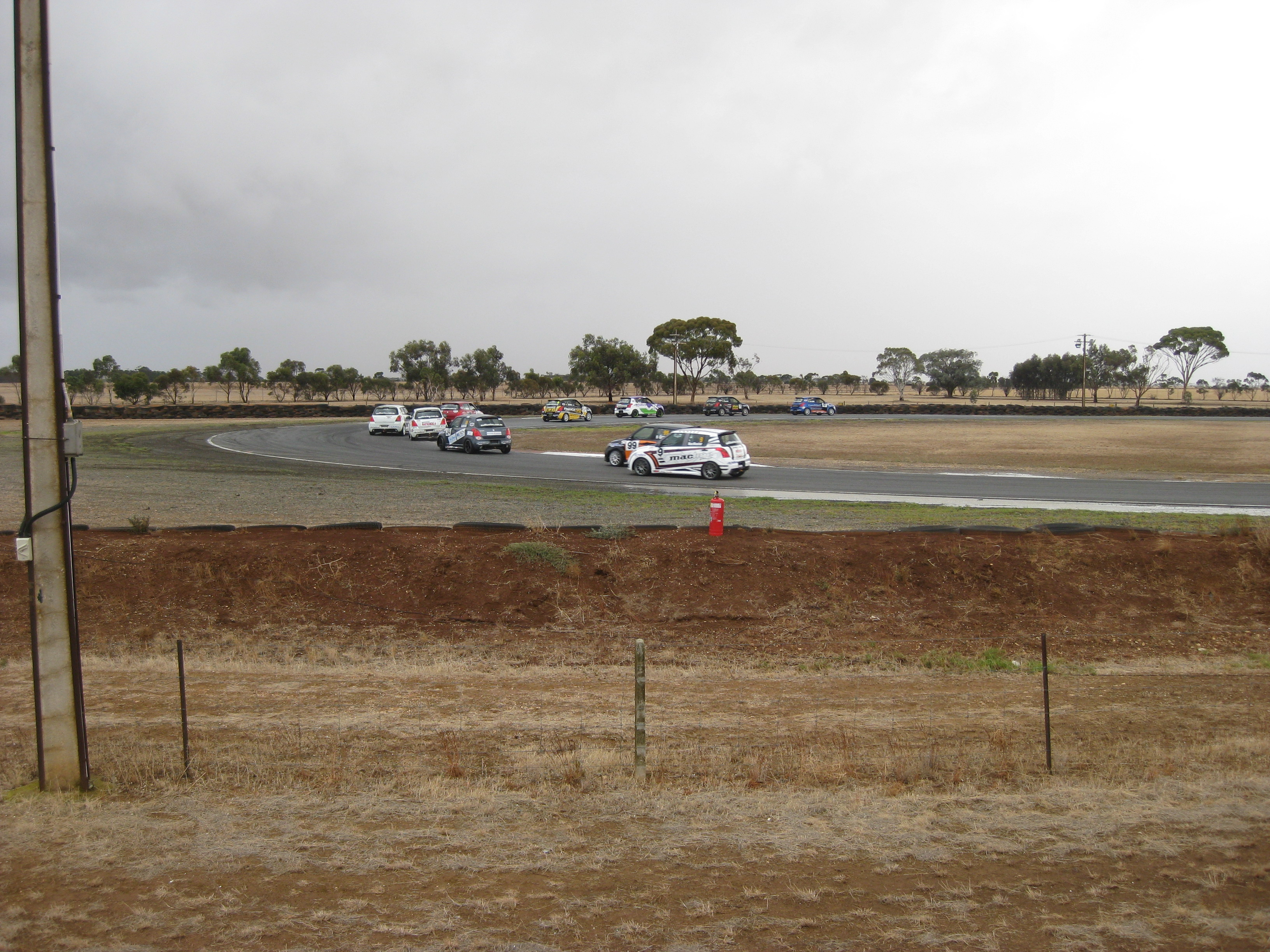
The Southern Hairpin at Mallala Motor Sport Park in 2013

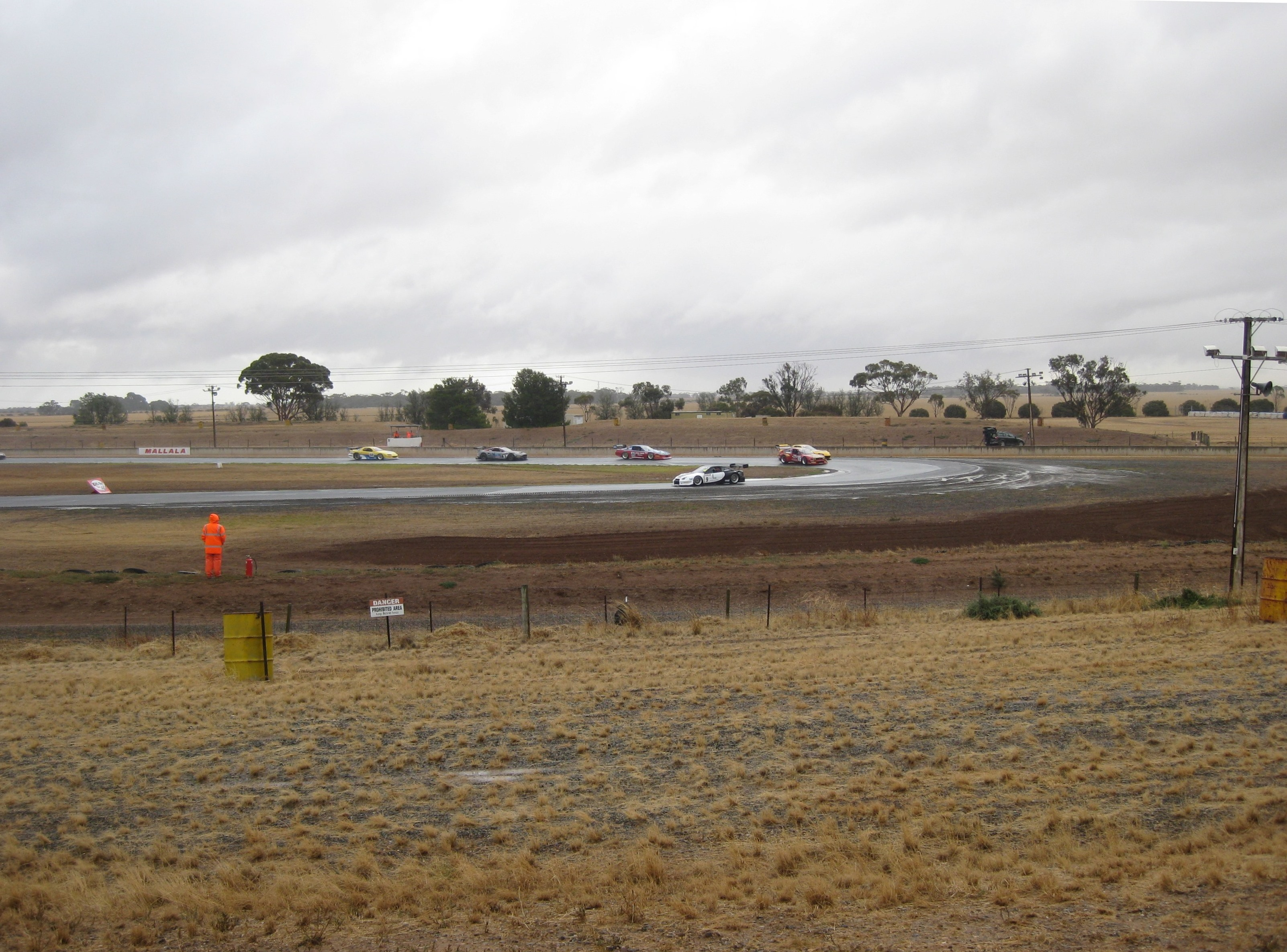
The Northern Hairpin at Mallala Motor Sport Park in 2013

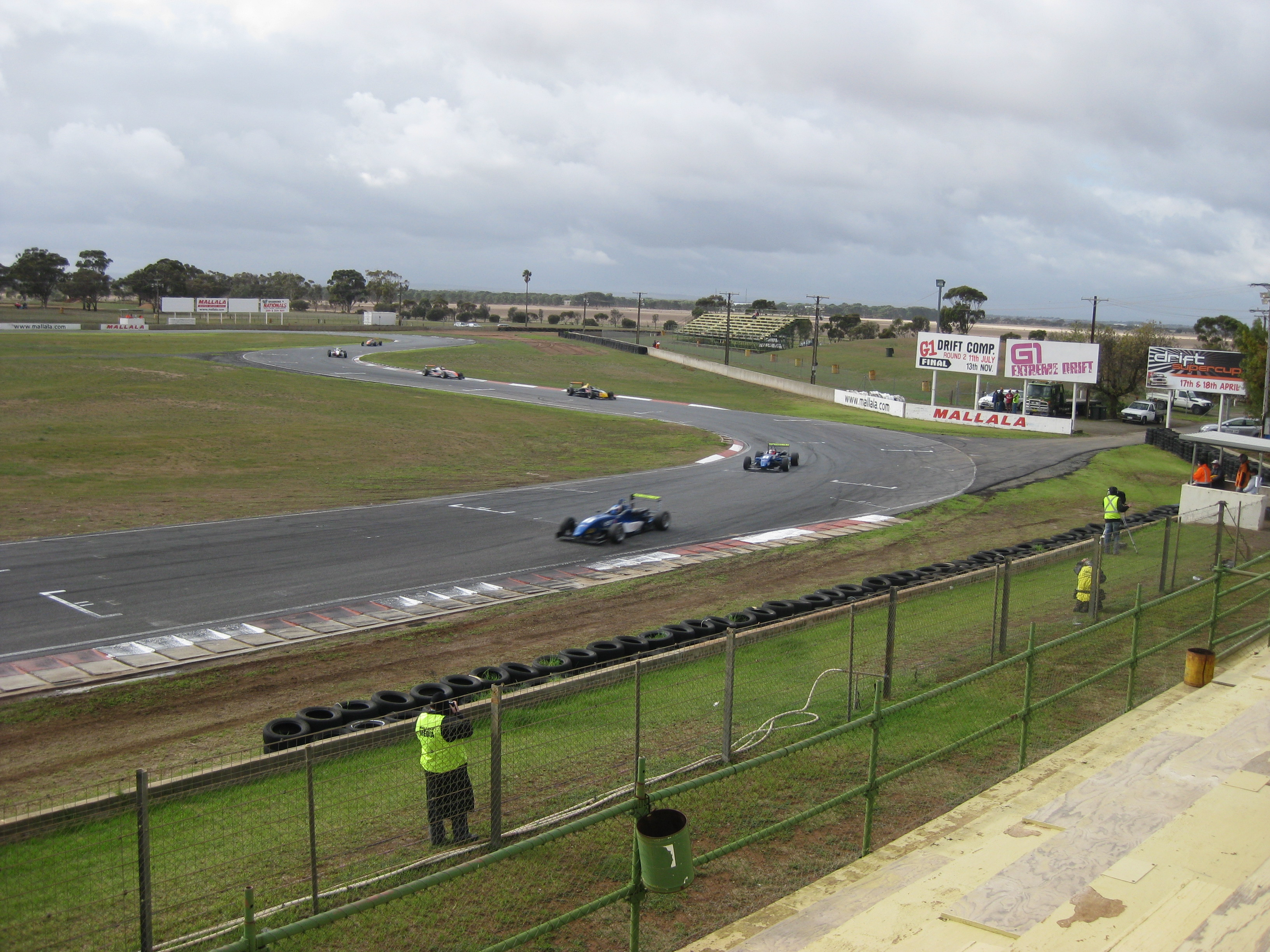
The Esses at Mallala Motor Sport Park in 2010

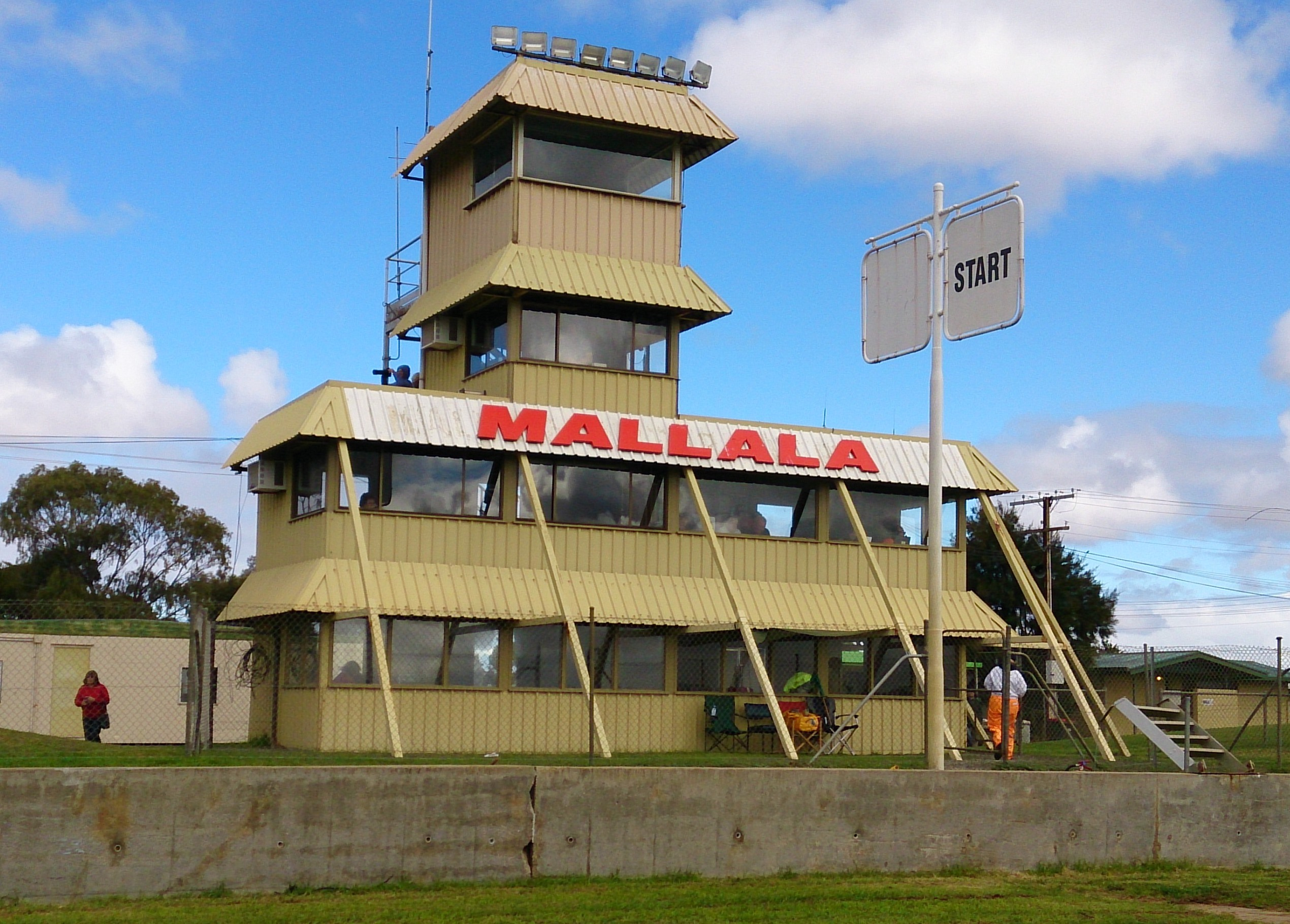
Race Control & PA Centre at Mallala Motor Sport Park in 2015

Following the purchase of the Mallala site by South Australia businessman and Sports Sedan racer Clem Smith in 1977, a Supreme Court decision declared the covenant unenforceable. The facility was then redeveloped and was reopened for motorcycle racing in 1980 and for car racing in 1982. It was now known as Mallala Motor Sport Park.

The circuit was initially issued with a "B" track license, thus excluding the staging of championship level racing, and the track's biggest annual event became Historic Mallala which was held each Easter. This was upgraded to an "A" track license in 1984, allowing Mallala to stage Round 5 of the 1984 Australian Formula 2 Championship on 3 June won by Keith McClelland driving a Cheetah Mk 8-VW. This was the first national championship round to be staged at the circuit since the final round of the 1971 Australian Sports Car Championship on 14 November 1971 won by John Harvey driving a McLaren M6B-Repco.

National championship motor racing continued sporadically over the next few years, but the circuit was brought back into national focus when it was chosen over Adelaide International to host a round of the Australian Touring Car Championship each year from 1989 to 1998. When that championship evolved into the Shell Championship Series in 1999, the Mallala round was replaced by the Clipsal 500, held on a shortened version of the Adelaide Street Circuit in an exclusive deal between V8 Supercars and the John Olsen led Government of South Australia. A round of the second tier V8 Supercar Development Series was held at Mallala Motor Sport Park each year from 2000 to 2006 before also moving to the Adelaide Street Circuit in 2007.

On 7 May 1989, Mallala had the honour of hosting the first ever Formula Holden race as part of the opening round of the 1989 Australian Drivers' Championship. Mark McLaughlin driving a South Australian designed and built Elfin FA891 won the opening heat of the meeting from former dual Australian Formula 2 champion Peter Glover, with television commentator turned race driver Neil Crompton finishing third.

Currently the main meetings held annually are the Mallala Historics each Easter and a round of the Shannons Nationals Motor Racing Championships staged shortly afterwards. Drifting now takes place on a regular basis in the form of the G1 Drift Competition and Drift Supercup which runs from turn 8 to turn 2. Supertruck Racing is no longer staged at Mallala due to the deteriorating surface of the track, the final event being in late 2009. Major meetings at Mallala are run by the Sporting Car Club of South Australia and other clubs that regularly use the circuit include the Adelaide Superkart Club, Marque Sports Car Association of SA, and the MG Car Club of SA. Since its re-opening, the Mallala circuit has also been used for private driver training courses and the South Australia Police use the circuit for driver training and assessment.

The Mallanats is an annual car show held at the circuit since 2009. The weekend includes burnout competitions and various performance car events similar to the Summernats format. The event returned once a year in 2010 and 2011, with two Mallanats events being scheduled in 2012.

The Elfin Mallala sports racing car was named after the circuit, having competed in its first race there.

=== Ownership by Peregrine Corporation ===
Following the passing of owner Clem Smith in February 2017 the Peregrine Corporation, owners of The Bend Motorsport Park, purchased the complex and took over the operations in May the same year. Peregrine Corporation is owned by the Shahin family who previously owned On the Run in Australia.

== Major events ==
=== Australian Grand Prix ===
In just its second race meeting, the Mallala Race Circuit hosted the 1961 Australian Grand Prix. The race was won by Lex Davison driving a Cooper T51 Coventry Climax FPF from Bib Stillwell, with David McKay finishing third. McKay finished first on the road, but was controversially penalised 60 seconds for an alleged jump start.

Year	Driver	Car	Entrant
Formula Libre
1961	Lex Davison	Cooper T51	BS Stillwell

=== Australian Touring Car Championship ===
Each year from 1960 to 1968 the Australian Touring Car Championship was contested as single race, with Mallala hosting the title in 1963 on its original 3.38 km (2.1 mi) layout. From 1969 onwards the championship was contested over a number of rounds with Mallala hosting a round each year from 1969 to 1971 and from 1989 to 1998. From 1972 to 1988 all ATCC rounds in South Australia were held at the Adelaide International Raceway. In 1999 the Australian Touring Car Championship was renamed to the Shell Championship Series with all South Australian rounds from that time held at a modified (shortened) version of the Adelaide Street Circuit.

In 1989 when the ATCC returned to Mallala after an absence of 18 years, the tight and bumpy circuit received mixed reviews from the top touring car drivers. Some, such as Nissan driver Jim Richards praised the circuit stating that the racing would be closer as it did not allow the all-powerful Ford Sierra RS500's to fully utilise their speed advantage. Others such as reigning (and that years) ATCC champion Dick Johnson were openly critical of the circuit and its lack of facilities, though some cynically noted that other than Bathurst, Johnson wouldn't admit to liking any circuit located outside of his home state of Queensland. Ironically, Dick Johnson would actually win the 1989 ATCC race at Mallala rather easily, claiming pole position and sprinting away from the field to win by 29 seconds after 60 minutes of racing. To his credit circuit owner Clem Smith would use the profits made from hosting Australia's highest profile race series which would regularly draw a capacity crowd despite not always having good weather, to continually upgrade the facilities at Mallala until the championship moved to Adelaide in 1999.

The following table lists the winner of the single race 1963 championship and the winners of each Australian Touring Car Championship round held at the Mallala circuit.

Year	Driver	Car	Entrant
Appendix J Touring Cars
1963	(Australia) Bob Jane	Jaguar Mark 2	Bob Jane
Group C Improved Production
1969	(Australia) Ian Geoghegan	Ford Mustang GTA	Mustang Team
1970	(Australia) Ian Geoghegan	Ford Mustang GTA	Geoghegan's Sporty Cars
1971	(Australia) Bob Jane	Chevrolet Camaro ZL-1	Bob Jane Racing Team
Group A
1989	(Australia) Dick Johnson	Ford Sierra RS500	Shell Ultra-Hi Racing
1990	(Australia) Colin Bond	Ford Sierra RS500	Caltex CXT Racing
1991	(Australia) Mark Skaife	Nissan Skyline R32 GT-R	Nissan Motor Sport
1992	(Australia) Mark Skaife	Nissan Skyline R32 GT-R	Winfield Team Nissan
Group 3A Touring Cars
1993	(Australia) Glenn Seton	Ford EB Falcon	Peter Jackson Racing
1994	(Australia) Mark Skaife	Holden VP Commodore	Winfield Racing
1995	(Australia) Glenn Seton	Ford EF Falcon	Peter Jackson Racing
1996	(Australia) Craig Lowndes	Holden VR Commodore	Holden Racing Team
1997	(New Zealand) Greg Murphy	Holden VS Commodore	Holden Racing Team
1998	(Australia) Russell Ingall	Holden VS Commodore	Castrol Perkins Racing

=== Australian Super Touring Championship ===
Mallala hosted the Australian Super Touring Championship (known as the Australian 2.0 Litre Touring Car Championship in 1993 and Australian Manufacturers' Championship in 1994) 8 times between 1993 and 2000–01.

Year	Winner	Car	Team
1993	(Australia) John Smith	Toyota Corolla Seca AE93	Caltex Team Toyota
1994	(Australia) Tony Longhurst	BMW 318i	Benson & Hedges Racing
1995	(Australia) Geoff Brabham	BMW 318i	Diet Coke BMW Racing
1996	(New Zealand) Greg Murphy	Audi A4 Quattro	Orix Audi Sport Australia
1997	(Australia) Cameron McConville	Audi A4 Quattro	Orix Audi Sport Australia
1998	(Australia) Brad Jones	Audi A4 Quattro	Audi Sport Australia
1999	(Australia) Paul Morris	BMW 320i	Paul Morris Motorsport
2000–01	(Australia) Paul Morris	BMW 320i	Paul Morris Motorsport

=== V8 Supercar Development Series ===
Mallala Motor Sport Park hosted a round of the V8 Supercar Development Series each year from the inception of the series in 2000 through to 2006. Since 2007 all South Australian rounds have been held at the Adelaide Parklands Circuit.

Year	Driver	Car	Entrant
2000	(Australia) David Besnard	Ford EL Falcon	Stone Brothers Racing
2001	(New Zealand) Simon Wills	Holden VT Commodore	Team Dynamik
2002	(Australia) Paul Dumbrell	Holden VX Commodore	Independent Race Cars Australia
2003	(Australia) Mark Winterbottom	Ford AU Falcon	Stone Brothers Racing
2004	(Australia) Greg Ritter	Ford AU Falcon	Speed FX Racing
2005	(Australia) Dean Canto	Ford BF Falcon	Dick Johnson Racing
2006	(Australia) Adam Macrow	Ford BA Falcon	Howard Racing

=== Australian Drivers' Championship ===
Mallala Race Circuit hosted the South Australian round of the annual Australian Drivers' Championship each year from 1961 to 1971. Mallala Motor Sport Park has hosted rounds in numerous years since 1988 including hosting the inaugural Formula Holden race in 1989..

Year	Driver	Car	Entrant
Formula Libre
1961	(Australia) Lex Davison	Cooper T51	BS Stillwell
1962	(Australia) Bib Stillwell	Cooper T53	BS Stillwell
1963	(Australia) John Youl	Cooper T55	John Youl
Australian National Formula & Australian 1½ Litre Formula
1964	(Australia) Lex Davison	Brabham BT4	Ecurie Australie
1965	(Australia) Bib Stillwell	Repco Brabham BT11A	BS Stillwell
1966	(Australia) John Harvey	Brabham BT14	RC Phillips
1967	(Australia) Spencer Martin	Repco Brabham BT11A	Bob Jane Racing Team
1968	(Australia) Leo Geoghegan	Lotus 39	Geoghegan Racing Team
Australian National Formula & Australian Formula 2
1969	(Australia) Garrie Cooper	Elfin 600C	Elfin Sports Cars
Australian Formula 1 & Australian Formula 2
1970	(Australia) Leo Geoghegan	Lotus 59	Geoghegan's Sporty Cars
1971	(Australia) John McCormack	Elfin MR5	Elfin Sports Cars
Australian Formula 2
1988	(Australia) Rohan Onslow	Cheetah Mk8	RJ MacArthur Onslow
Formula Holden
1989	(Australia) Mark McLaughlin	Elfin FA891	Elfin Sports Cars
1990	(Australia) Mark Skaife	SPA FB001	Skaife Racing
Formula Brabham
1991	(Australia) Mark Skaife	SPA 003	Skaife Racing
1994	(Australia) Paul Stokell	Reynard 91D	Birrana Racing
1995	(Australia) Paul Stokell	Reynard 91D	Birrana Racing
Formula Holden
1996	(Australia) Jason Bright	Reynard 91D	Birrana Racing
1997	(Australia) Mark Noske	Lola T93/50	Mark Noske
2000	(New Zealand) Simon Wills	Reynard 94D	Birrana Racing
2001	(Australia) Rick Kelly	Reynard 94D	Holden Young Lions
2002	(Australia) Will Power	Reynard 94D	Ralt Australia
Formula 4000
2003	(New Zealand) Daniel Gaunt	Reynard 96D	Ralt Australia / Pure Power Racing
2004	(Australia) Neil McFadyen	Reynard 96D	Ralt Australia
Australian Formula 3
2005	(Australia) Michael Caruso	Dallara F301	Picollo Scuderia Corse
2006	(United Kingdom) Ben Clucas	Dallara F304	Gawler Farm Machinery
2007	(United Kingdom) James Winslow	Dallara F304	Piccola Scuderia Corse
2008	(Australia) Leanne Tander	Dallara F307	TanderSport
2010	(United Kingdom) Ben Barker	Dallara F307	Team BRM
2017	(Australia) Calan Williams	Dallara F311	Gilmour Racing

=== Australian Formula 2 Championship ===
Australian Formula 2 Championship raced at Mallala 6 times between 1971 and 1988. The 1984 championship races were the first time the circuit had been used for CAMS sanctioned national championship racing of any category since 1971.

Year	Winner	Car	Team
1971	(Australia) Henk Woelders	Elfin 600C	Bill Patterson Racing
1984	(Australia) Keith McClelland	Cheetah Mk 8	Keith McClelland
1985	(Australia) Peter Glover	Cheetah Mk 8	Peter Macrow
1986	(Australia) Jon Crooke	Cheetah Mk 8	Jonathon Crooke
1987	(Australia) Mark McLaughlin	Elfin 852	Elfin Sports Cars Pty Ltd
1988	(Australia) Rohan Onslow	Cheetah Mk 8	RJ MacArthur Onslow

=== Australian Sports Sedan Championship ===
The Australian Sports Sedan Championship raced at Mallala 6 times between 1991 and 2003.

Year	Winner	Car	Team
1991	(Australia) Mick Monterosso	Ford Escort Mark II Chevrolet	Mick Monterosso
1992	(Australia) Brian Smith	Alfa Romeo Alfetta GTV Chevrolet	B. Smith
1998	(Australia) Tony Ricciardello	Alfa Romeo Alfetta GTV Chevrolet	Basil Ricciardello
1999	(Australia) Tony Ricciardello	Alfa Romeo Alfetta GTV Chevrolet	Basil Ricciardello
2000	(Australia) Kerry Baily	Nissan 300ZX Chevrolet	Kerry Baily
2003	(Australia) Tony Ricciardello	Alfa Romeo Alfetta GTV Chevrolet	Basil Ricciardello

=== Australian Nations Cup Championship ===
The Australian Nations Cup Championship raced at Mallala in 2004. It would be the final ever round of the Nations Cup Championship for GT style cars.

Year	Winner	Car	Team
2004	(Australia) James Brock	Holden Monaro 427C	Team Brock

=== Australian GT Championship ===
The Australian GT Championship raced at Mallala in 2006.

Year	Winner	Car	Team
2006	(Australia) Bryce Washington	Porsche 911 (996) GT3 Cup	ADRAD Radiator Experts

== Events list ==
Current

- April: All Historic Mallala
- November: Australian Prototype Series Hi-Tec Oils Mallala Homecoming

Future

- Super2 Series (2000–2006, 2027)

Former

- Australasian Superbike Championship (2014–2016)
- Australian Drivers' Championship (1961–1971, 1988–1991, 1994–1997, 2000–2008, 2010, 2017)
- Australian Formula 2 (1971, 1984–1988)
- Australian Formula Ford Championship (1985–1986, 1989–1998, 2000–2006, 2014)
- Australian Grand Prix (1961)
- Australian GT Championship (2006)
- Australian GT Production Car Championship (1994–1998)
- Australian Improved Production Nationals (1995, 2000, 2005, 2011)
- Australian National Trans-Am Series (2025)
- Australian Nations Cup Championship (2004)
- Australian Performance Car Championship (2004, 2006)
- Australian Production Car Championship (1989–1992, 1994–1995, 2004–2005, 2007)
- Australian Super Touring Championship (1993–2000, 2002)
- Australian Superbike Championship (1990–2009)
- Australian Suzuki Swift Series (2011–2013)
- Australian Touring Car Championship (1963, 1969–1971, 1989–1998)
- Australian Tourist Trophy (1962, 1968)
- Australian V8 Touring Car Series (2008–2014)
- National Sports Sedan Series (1991–1992, 1998–2000, 2003–2004, 2007–2014)
- Porsche GT3 Cup Challenge Australia (2008–2014)
- Sports Racer Series (2012–2014)
- TA2 Racing Muscle Car Series (2025)
- V8 Ute Racing Series (2004–2005)

== Lap records ==
As of September 2025, the fastest official race lap records at Mallala Motor Sport Park are listed as:

Category	Time	Driver	Vehicle	Date
Full Circuit (1964–1971, 1980–present): 2.601 km (1.616 mi)
Formula Holden	1:02.570	(Australia) Paul Stokell	Reynard 90D	7 August 1994
Formula Three	1:03.4078	(Australia) Calan Williams	Dallara F311	11 June 2017
Sports Sedan	1:05.6328	(Australia) Tony Ricciardello	Alfa Romeo Alfetta GTV-Chevrolet	27 April 2014
Superbike	1:05.767	(Australia) Daniel Falzon	Yamaha YZF-R1	6 March 2021
Time Attack Pro Class	1:05.8612	(Australia) Matt Longhurst	Nissan Skyline GT-R R34	18 November 2017
Sports Racer	1:05.9810	(United Kingdom) James Winslow	West WR 1000	26 April 2014
Superkart	1:06.3237	(Australia) Gary Pegoraro	Anderson Maverick FPE	7 June 2009
Innovation Race Cars	1:07.3000	(Australia) Lee Stibbs	Ford Mustang IRC GT - Chevrolet	27 September 2025
Supersport	1:07.424	(Australia) Jamie Stauffer	Yamaha YZF-R6	31 August 2009
GT3	1:07.6377	(Australia) Mark Rosser	Audi R8 LMS GT3	10 October 2021
Group 3A	1:08.1437	(New Zealand) Greg Murphy	Holden VS Commodore	13 July 1997
Nations Cup	1:08.5179	(Australia) Paul Stokell	Lamborghini Diablo GTR	19 September 2004
Dunlop V8 Supercar	1:08.7330	(Australia) Paul Dumbrell	Holden VT Commodore	12 August 2001
Porsche Carrera Cup	1:09.0918	(Australia) John Goodacre	Porsche 911 (997) GT3 Cup 3.8	27 April 2014
Trans Am	1:09.0970	(Australia) Jarrod Hughes	Chevrolet Camaro Trans-Am	27 September 2025
Prostock	1:09.231	(Australia) Pat Medcalf	Yamaha YZF-R1	31 August 2009
Group A	1:09.26	(Australia) Mark Skaife	Nissan Skyline GT-R R32	31 May 1992
Formula 1000	1:09.3565	(Australia) Aaron Steer	Firman F1000	23 May 2015
V8 Touring Cars	1:09.7286	(Australia) Shae Davies	Ford Falcon BF	20 April 2013
Super Touring	1:10.2569	(Australia) Brad Jones	Audi A4 Quattro	19 July 1998
Formula Ford	1:11.3624	(Australia) Nick Percat	Van Diemen RF04	17 September 2006
Sidecar	1:11.505	(United Kingdom) Steve Abbott / Jamie Biggs	Suzuki LCR	5 June 2005
125cc GP	1:12.265	(Australia) Brett Simmonds	Honda RS 125	5 June 2005
Improved Production Outright	1:12.4487	(Australia) Andy Sarandis	Mitsubishi Lancer Evolution 8 RS	8 July 2023
Time Attack ClubSprint	1:12.4631	(Australia) Michael Garland	Subaru Impreza RX	18 February 2023
Improved Production Class B	1:15.5948	(Australia) Michael De Luca	Mazda RX-7	21 Aug 2016
Formula Vee	1:16.5879	(Australia) Andrew Ford	Birrana 274	12 March 2022
Commodore Cup	1:17.6841	(Australia) Daniel Richert	Holden VS Commodore	1 July 2007
Saloon Cars	1:18.6555	(Australia) Wayne King	Holden VT Commodore	23 May 2016
Porsche 944	1:19.6163	(Australia) Chris Lewis-Williams	Porsche 944	19 August 2017
Production Cars	1:19.3665	(Australia) Steve Knight	Mitsubishi Lancer Evo 8	17 October 2007
V8 Utes	1:21.4940	(Australia) Grant Johnson	Holden SS Ute	21 August 2005
Circuit Excel	1:25.3746	(Australia) Joel Johnson	Hyundai Excel	10 July 2022
HQ Holdens	1:26.8479	(Australia) Peter Lines	Holden HQ Kingswood	15 August 1999
Full Circuit (1961–1964): 3.379 km (2.100 mi)
Formula Libre	1:44.000	(Australia) Bill Patterson (Australia) Lex Davison	Cooper T51; Cooper T51	9 October 1961
Sports car racing	1:56.900	(Australia) David McKay	Elfin Mallala	28 December 1962
Group 1	1:57.200	(Australia) Bob Jane	Jaguar Mark 2 4.1	15 April 1963

== See also ==
- Mallala (disambiguation)
