= 1988 Australian Drivers' Championship =

Motor racing competition

Seasons
- ← 1987 1989 →

The 1988 Australian Drivers' Championship was a CAMS sanctioned national motor racing title which was awarded to the winner of the 1988 Australian Formula 2 Championship. The winning driver received the 1988 CAMS Gold Star and is recognised by CAMS as the winner of both the 43rd Australian Drivers' Championship and the 21st Australian Formula 2 Championship. 1988 was the second and last year in which the Australian Drivers' Championship was contested by Australian Formula 2 cars, this being an interim arrangement between the demise of Formula Mondial in Australia at the end of 1986 and the introduction of Formula Holden in 1989.

New South Wales driver Rohan Onslow won the first of his two Australian Drivers' Championships and his only Australian Formula 2 Championship driving a Cheetah Mk.8 Volkswagen and a Ralt RT30 Volkswagen. Queensland driver Derek Pingel (Ralt RT30 Volkswagen) finished second with Barry Ward (Ralt RT30 Volkswagen) placed third. Onslow and Neil Israel (Magnum 863 Volkswagen) each attained two round wins with single victories scored by Pingel, Ward and factory Nissan Touring Car driver Glenn Seton, who drove a Nissan Pulsar powered Ralt RT4 in two rounds of the championship. Seton's win at Adelaide International Raceway would be the only win for a car powered by an engine other than a Volkswagen Golf unit during the two years in which Australian Formula 2 cars contested the Australian Drivers' Championship.

== Race calendar ==
The championship was contested over a seven-round series with one race per round.

Round	Circuit	State	Date	Winning driver	Winning car
1	Calder Park	Victoria	26 March	Neil Israel	Magnum 863 Volkswagen
2	Amaroo Park	New South Wales	27 March	Barry Ward	Ralt RT30 Volkswagen
3	Oran Park	New South Wales	17 April	Neil Israel	Magnum 863 Volkswagen
4	Adelaide International Raceway	South Australia	1 May	Glenn Seton	Ralt RT4 Nissan
5	Mallala Motor Sport Park	South Australia	5 June	Rohan Onslow	Cheetah Mk.8 Volkswagen
6	Lakeside	Queensland	24 July	Derek Pingel	Ralt RT30 Volkswagen
7	Sandown Park	Victoria	11 September	Rohan Onslow	Ralt RT30/85 Volkswagen

== Points system ==
Championship points were awarded on a 30-27-24-21-19-17-15-14-13-12-11-10-9-8-7-6-5-4-3-2 basis for the first twenty places at each round. Only the best six results from the seven rounds could be retained by each driver.

== Championship results ==
Position	Driver	No.	Car	Entrant	Cal	Ama	Ora	Ade	Mal	Lak	San	Total
1	Rohan Onslow	7	Cheetah Mk.8 Volkswagen & Ralt RT30/85 Volkswagen	RJ MacArthur Onslow	27	-	27	27	30	27	30	168
2	Derek Pingel	8	Ralt RT30 Volkswagen	Ralt Australia Pty Ltd	-	27	24	24	-	30	21	126
3	Barry Ward	4	Ralt RT30 Volkswagen	Barry Ward	19	30	21	-	-	-	24	94
4	Graham Blee	2	Cheetah Mk.6 Volkswagen	Graham Blee	14	15	(12)	17	13	14	14	87
5	Graeme Smith	27	Cheetah Mk.8 Volkswagen	Graeme Smith	24	19	-	-	12	17	17	89
6	Neil Israel	44	Magnum 863 Volkswagen	Magnum Racing Australia	30	-	30	-	27	-	-	87
7	Rod Moody	18	Cheetah Mk.6 Toyota	Rod Moody	11	13	-	-	19	19	15	77
8	Wayne Ford	31	Ralt RT3 Ford	Wayne Ford	-	-	13	19	24	-	9	65
9	Arthur Abrahams	1	Cheetah Mk.8 Volkswagen	New Racing Corporation	21	21	-	-	-	-	-	42
10	Ron Barnacle	5	Wren Volkswagen	David Green	9	-	-	21	-	-	11	41
11	Tony Rees	79	Ralt RT3 Volkswagen	AG Rees	-	14	14	-	-	-	12	40
12	Bap Romano	35	Elfin 852 Volkswagen		15	24	-	-	-	-	-	39
13	Barry Johnson	74	Cheetah Mk.8 Volkswagen	Barry Johnson	-	-	17	-	17	-	-	34
14	Brian Sampson	78	Cheetah Mk.6 Toyota	Brian Sampson	10	-	15	-	-	-	5	30
=	Glenn Seton	53	Ralt RT4 Nissan	Dave Thompson	-	-	-	30	-	-	-	30
16	Mike Drewer	45	Cheetah Mk.7 Volkswagen	Mike Drewer	-	-	-	15	14	-	-	29
17	Roger Martin		Cheetah Mk.8 Volkswagen		-	-	-	-	-	-	27	27
18	Noel Orphan		Elfin 700 Ford		-	-	-	-	-	24	-	24
19	Bronte Rundle	29	Kaditcha Alfa Romeo	Bronte Rundle	8	-	-	-	15	-	-	23
20	Dean Hosking	25	Arbyen Volkswagen	The Volkshop	-	-	-	-	21	-	-	21
=	Rolf Vine		March 77B Volkswagen		-	-	-	-	-	21	-	21
22	Ian Richards	22	Richards 201C Volkswagen	Ian Richards	-	-	19	-	-	-	-	19
=	Carl Gibson		Elfin 792 Volkswagen		-	-	-	-	-	-	19	19
24	John Wise		Cheetah Mk.7 Volkswagen		17	-	-	-	-	-	-	17
=	David Goode		Elfin 700 Ford		-	17	-	-	-	-	-	17
26	Kees Koppenol		Elfin 700 Ford		-	-	-	-	-	15	-	15
27	Shane Flynn	17	Kaditcha Volkswagen		13	-	-	-	-	-	-	13
=	David Robinson		Cheetah Mk.6 Toyota		-	-	-	-	-	13	-	13
=	Adrian Martin		Ralt RT1 Ford		-	-	-	-	-	-	13	13
30	Ray Cutchie		Ralt RT4 Ford		12	-	-	-	-	-	-	12
31	Peter Jones	65	Cheetah Mk.8 Volkswagen	Peter Jones	-	-	-	-	11	-	-	11
32	Ian Caldwell	6	Cheetah Mk.6 Mitsubishi	Ian Caldwell	-	-	-	-	10	-	-	10
=	Sam Astuti	12	Cheetah Mk.6 Ford	Sam Astuti	-	-	-	-	-	-	10	10
34	Ray Colenso	76	Cheetah Mk.7 Volkswagen	Ray Colenso	-	-	-	-	-	-	8	8
35	Peter Clark		Magnum 823 Volkswagen		-	-	-	-	-	-	7	7
36	Ian Carrig		CRD 852		-	-	-	-	-	-	6	6

== Championship name ==
Whilst the 1988 Australian Formula 2 Championship winner was awarded the CAMS Gold Star, it was not certain at the time that the winner would be officially recognised as the 1988 Australian Champion Driver. Subsequently, however, the Confederation of Australian Motor Sport listed Onslow as the winner of both the 1988 Australian Formula 2 Championship and the 1988 Australian Drivers' Championship.
