= 1986 Australian Formula 2 Championship =

The 1986 Australian Formula 2 Championship was a CAMS sanctioned Australian national motor racing title open to Australian Formula 2 cars. The title, which was the 19th Australian Formula 2 Championship, was won by Jonathan Crooke, driving a Cheetah Mk.8 Volkswagen.

== Calendar ==
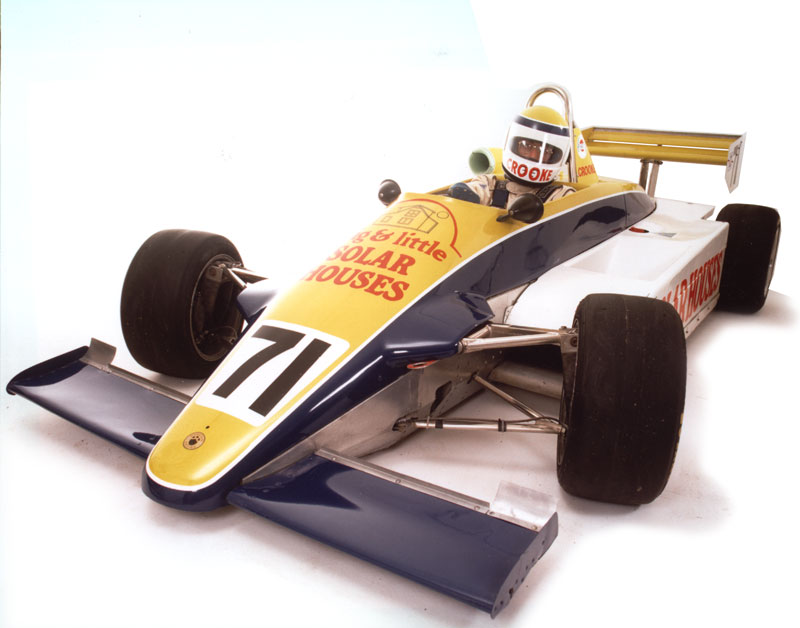
Championship winner Jonathan Crooke (Cheetah Mk.8 Volkswagen)

The 1986 Australian Formula 2 Championship was contested over a nine-round series.

Round	Circuit	State	Date	Round format	Round winner	Car
1	Symmons Plains	Tasmania	9 March	One race	Arthur Abrahams	Cheetah Mk.8 Volkswagen
2	Baskerville	Tasmania	16 March	Two races	Jonathan Crooke	Cheetah Mk.8 Volkswagen
3	Surfers Paradise	Queensland	18 May	One race	Jonathan Crooke	Cheetah Mk.8 Volkswagen
4	Oran Park	New South Wales	8 June	One race	Mark McLaughlin	Elfin 852 Volkswagen
5	Lakeside	Queensland	15 June	One race	Jonathan Crooke	Cheetah Mk.8 Volkswagen
6	Adelaide International Raceway	South Australia	6 July	One race	Jonathan Crooke	Cheetah Mk.8 Volkswagen
7	Mallala Motor Sport Park	South Australia	3 August	Two races	Jonathan Crooke	Cheetah Mk.8 Volkswagen
8	Winton	Victoria	31 August	Two races	Jonathan Crooke	Cheetah Mk.8 Volkswagen
9	Sandown Park	Victoria	14 September	One race	Jonathon Crooke	Cheetah Mk.8 Volkswagen

== Points system ==
Points were awarded to the first 20 placegetters in each race as per the following table:

Race position	1st	2nd	3rd	4th	5th	6th	7th	8th	9th	10th	11th	12th	13th	14th	15th	16th	17th	18th	19th	20th
Points	30	27	24	21	19	17	15	14	13	12	11	10	9	8	7	6	5	4	3	2

- Where a round was contested over two races, each driver's points were aggregated and then divided by the two to determine the championship points allocation for that round.
- Only the best eight round results counted towards a driver's total.

== Championship results ==
Position	Driver	No.	Car	Entrant	Sym.	Bas.	Sur.	Ora.	Lak.	Ade.	Mal.	Win.	San.	Total
1	Jonathan Crooke	71 & 18	Cheetah Mk.8 Volkswagen	Jonathan Crooke	27	30	30	(15)	30	30	28.5	30	30	235.5
2	Mark McLaughlin	9 & 14	Elfin 852 Volkswagen	Elfin Sports Cars	-	27	21	30	-	21	15	27	27	168
3	Derek Pingel	5	Cheetah Mk.8 Volkswagen	Derek Pingel	15	10.5	27	-	27	27	18	15	24	163.5
4	Bob Power	8	Ralt RT3 Volkswagen	Bob Power	19	24	24	27	14	24	17	-	14	163
5	Arthur Abrahams	19	Cheetah Mk.8 Volkswagen	Arthur Abrahams	30	8.5	13	-	19	-	-	-	21	91.5
6	Grahame Blee	2	Cheetah Mk.6GE Toyota	Grahame Blee	10	6	-	21	-	14	19	10	-	80
7	Ian Richards	11	Richards 201C Volkswagen	Ian Richards	17	9.5	15	-	-	-	25.5	9.5	-	76.5
8	Hugh Gartley	44	HTG FII Toyota	Hugh Gartley	12	10.5	-	17	15	-	13.5	-	7	75
9	Steve Noble	46	Richards 201B Volkswagen	John Silman	-	-	12	12	-	-	11.5	13	15	63.5
10	Peter Macrow	25	Cheetah Mk.8 Volkswagen	Macrow Motors	24	20	19	-	-	-	-	-	-	63

Note:

- The above table lists only the top ten championship positions.
- Only the best eight round results counted towards a driver's total. Discarded points are shown within brackets.
