= Australian Formula 2 =

Single-Seater Racing Championship

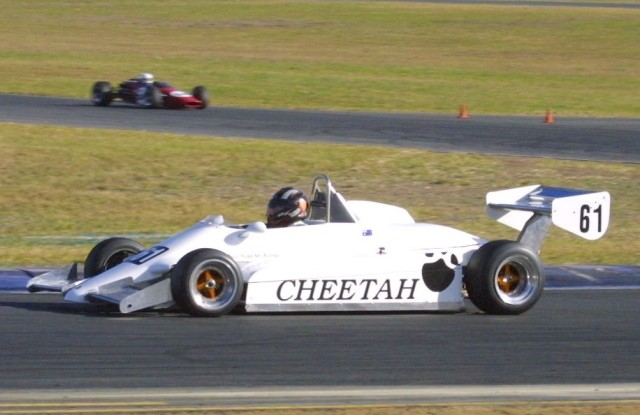
Cheetah Formula 2 car

Australian Formula 2, sometimes abbreviated to AF2 or ANF2, is a "wings and slicks" formula racing category in Australia. The category is one of Australia's oldest, dating back to 1964. The current format of AF2 was introduced in 1978. Brian Shead of Cheetah Racing Cars and Garrie Cooper of Elfin Sports Cars were largely responsible for the development of the format, which was devised to suit the needs of Australian drivers, most of whom had little or no sponsorship and had to bear the costs of racing out of their own pockets.

The class was an amalgamation of the previous Australian Formula 2 and Australian Formula 3 categories, using the same or newly developed cars, but powered by production-based single-cam, 2 valve per cylinder engines, with an engine capacity between 1100 cc and 1600 cc. Popular engines initially included the Toyota 2T, Ford Kent and Holden Gemini. Later on the Volkswagen Golf became the engine of choice due to its lighter weight and greater power levels. Initially the new format proved to be very successful, attracting the largest grids seen in Australian formula racing for years. The manufacture of cars in Australia for the formula flourished. It wasn't uncommon to see cars designed and built by the same person that drove them.

For a brief period when Formula 5000 was in its final death throes, AF2 was arguably (but not officially) Australia's top class of racing car. It had a national championship as well as various state series. AF2 was bumped down from being the number one Australian racing formula with the introduction of the slightly faster but far more expensive Formula Pacific category. Throughout the 1980s AF2 remained an extremely popular and competitive category and the Australian Drivers' Championship was contested with Formula 2 cars in both 1987 and 1988.

In 1999 CAMS introduced 2-litre international Formula Three engines into AF2. The 1600cc class was meant to become the second tier of the formula and then to be discontinued. Despite this 1600cc AF2 remained a popular Formula, perhaps because it was a far cheaper formula than Formula Three and Formula Brabham/Holden/4000.

Since then, the popularity of AF2 has slowly diminished and the series has contracted from being a national series, to one that is contested in New South Wales, although there are plans afoot to also incorporate Victoria.

== Timeline ==
- 1964–1968 : 1100 cc maximum capacity (production-based) & 1000 cc (free design)
- 1969–1970 : 1600 cc maximum capacity
- 1971–1977 : 1600 cc maximum capacity, two valves per cylinder
- 1978–1988 : 1600 cc maximum capacity, production-based, single camshaft
- 1989-2002 : 1600 cc maximum capacity, production-based, single camshaft & 2000 cc (FIA Formula Three engines)
- 2003–date : 1600 cc maximum capacity, production-based, single camshaft

== History ==
The Australian Formula 2 category was established by the Confederation of Australian Motor Sport (CAMS) in 1964 as the third tier of single seater motor racing in Australia, below the Australian National Formula and the Australian 1½ Litre Formula and above Australian Formula 3. It was a two part formula consisting of (a) cars using production based engines of up to 1100cc capacity (the discontinued Formula Junior class from 1963) and (b) cars using free design four cylinder engines of up to 1000cc capacity (the then current FIA Formula Two class). A single race Australian Formula 2 Championship was instituted in 1964 however the title was discontinued after two years.

The engine capacity was raised to 1600cc in 1969, AF2 thus replacing the discontinued Australian 1½ Litre Formula as the country's second tier single seater category. From the same year AF2 cars were eligible to compete alongside the 2½ litre Australian National Formula cars in the Australian Drivers' Championship for the first time. The Australian Formula 2 Championship was reintroduced for 1969 and was contested concurrently with the final round of the 1969 Australian Drivers' Championship. It became a stand-alone, single race title again in 1970.

For 1971, engines with more than two valves per cylinder were banned as were those of less than 1100cc capacity. In the same year the Australian Formula 2 Championship was contested over a series of races for the first time with all rounds run concurrently with those of the 1971 Australian Driver's Championship. The 1974 championship, which enjoyed significant sponsorship from the Van Heusen Shirt Company, was run as a totally stand alone series.

The declining state of the category saw the 1977 championship downgraded to a single race affair and new regulations were announced to take effect in 1978. The engines were to be limited to 1600cc production based units with valve actuation by single overhead camshaft or pushrods. There was no national championship for the new AF2 in this first year but a championship series was reintroduced for 1979.

AF2 regulations were amended for 1987 to eliminate underbody aerodynamic aids, thus bringing the formula in line with Europe/UK. The decline of Australia's premier open wheel category, Formula Mondial, saw the Australian Drivers' Championship move from that category to AF2 in the same year, with the title awarded to the winner of the Australia Cup, an AF2 race held in support of the 1987 Australian Grand Prix at the Adelaide Street Circuit. The Australian Formula 2 Championship continued and for 1988 the Australian Drivers' Championship was awarded to the winner of the Australian Formula 2 Championship series. The 1988 AF2C title was to be the last awarded by CAMS and the Australian Drivers' Championship was to be determined over a series of races for the new Formula Holden category for 1989.

In an effort to increase fields, an additional class for cars using 2-litre FIA Formula Three engines was incorporated into AF2 for 1999 alongside the existing 1600cc class FIA Formula Three was itself officially adopted in Australia as a separate category the following year but the 2-litre cars remained eligible to compete in AF2 through to 2002. AF2 reverted to a single class 1600cc formula again for 2003.

== Engine ==
In the current form of AF2, the engine must be based on one from a mass-produced vehicle. Popular engines include the pushrod hemi headed Toyota 2T, the crossflow Ford Kent, and Holden Gemini, but the most common is the Volkswagen Golf. The Volkswagen Golf is popular due to its lighter weight and greater power levels. AF2 engines must use carburetors for fuel induction, with most running Weber carburetors. AF2 engines are now limited to 8500 rpm although in the past prior to the introduction of rev limiters, engine revs over 10,000 rpm were not uncommon. AF2 engines typically produce in the order of 180 to 200 horsepower (150 kW).

== Chassis ==
The majority of AF2 cars produced in the late 1970s and 1980s are made from an aluminium monocoque, just as Formula One cars of the era were. Such cars often weigh in under 400 kilograms (880 lb) and the allowable racing weight including the driver is 510 kilograms (1,120 lb). Newer cars such as those made by Reynard and Dallara during the 1990s are made of carbon fibre and are actually heavier than the aluminium cars, although they are also more aerodynamic. The newer cars have a 530 kg racing weight, which helps to equalise their performance with the older cars. AF2 cars feature prominent front and rear wings. The wheels are 13 inches (33 cm) in diameter, with the front wheels typically 9 inches (23 cm) wide and rears typically 11 inches (28 cm) wide. They are configured as an open-wheeler, and are shod with control Dunlop radial slicks.

== Transmission ==
Like most formula cars, the transmission is at the rear of the car, situated behind both the engine and driver. The most common transmission in aluminium monocoque cars is the 5 speed Hewland Mk9 transaxle, but the Hewland Mk8 and stronger FT200 transaxles are also used. Another popular transaxle used in monocoque cars, mainly Cheetah Racing cars was manufactured by Holinger Engineering. Like the Hewland Mk8 and Mk9 it is also based on the Volkswagen transaxle. Newer carbon Fibre Dallaras and Reynards typically use transaxle housings manufactured by the car manufacturer, although they sport Hewland internals.

== Performance ==
Power levels approaching 200 horsepower (150 kW) combined with a racing weight of only 510 to 530 kg, provide a power-to-weight ratio similar to a V8 Supercar. This allows AF2 cars to accelerate very quickly out of corners and to develop some reasonable top speeds. The approximate 0 to 160 km/h time for an AF2 is 5 seconds. Because the cars are so low, and light and because they have grippy slick tyres and front and rear wings to force them to the ground, the cars are capable of generating very high G forces when cornering and braking.

== Current regulations – Australian Formula 2 Club Inc. ==
The engine must be based on that from a mass-produced vehicle, it must have a capacity between 1100 cc and 1600 cc, have a single camshaft operating no more than 2 valves per cylinder and use carburetors for fuel induction. A rev limiter must be fitted to limit maximum engine RPM to 8500.

The bodywork must be of an "open wheel" configuration and there are limitations on both the position and size of the front and rear wings. The car must have a flat floor between the front and rear wheels and the minimum weight of the combined car and driver (racing weight) is either 510 kg or 530 kg depending on the age of the car.

The class uses a "control tyre" manufactured by Dunlop, to ensure both close competition and good tyre life.

== List of Australian Formula 2 champions ==
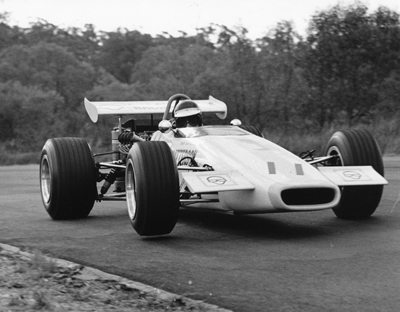
1971 Championship winner Henk Woelders (Elfin 600 Waggott)

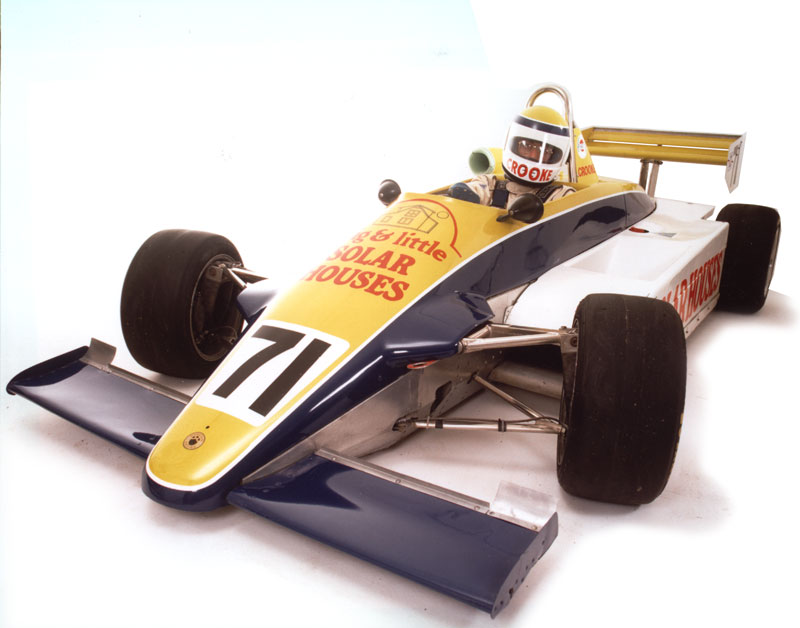
1986 Championship winner Jonathan Crooke (Cheetah Mk.8 Volkswagen)

Season	Driver	Car
1964	Greg Cusack	Elfin FJ Ford Cosworth
1965	Greg Cusack	Repco Brabham Cosworth
1966–1968	No championship	
1969	Max Stewart	Mildren Waggott
1970	Max Stewart	Mildren Waggott
1971	Henk Woelders	Elfin 600C Waggott
1972	Larry Perkins	Elfin 600B Ford
1973	Leo Geoghegan	Birrana 272 & 273 Ford
1974	Leo Geoghegan	Birrana 274 Ford
1975	Geoff Brabham	Birrana 274 Ford
1976	Graeme Crawford	Birrana 273 Ford
1977	Peter Larner	Elfin 700 Ford
1978	No championship	
1979	Brian Shead	Cheetah Mk6 Toyota
1980	Richard Davison	Hardman JH1 Ford
1981	John Smith	Ralt RT1 Ford
1982	Lucio Cesario	Ralt RT3 Volkswagen
1983	Ian Richards	Richards 201 Volkswagen
1984	Peter Glover	Cheetah Mk7 Volkswagen
1985	Peter Glover	Cheetah Mk8 Volkswagen
1986	Jonathan Crooke	Cheetah Mk8 Volkswagen
1987	Arthur Abrahams	Cheetah Mk8 Volkswagen
1988	Rohan Onslow	Cheetah Mk8 Volkswagen; Ralt RT30/85 Volkswagen

CAMS recognition of the Australian Formula 2 Championship as a national title did not extend beyond 1988

Season	Driver	Car
1989	Kevin Weeks	Ralt RT32-Volkswagen
1990–1995	No information available	
1996	Bronte Rundle	Reynard-Volkswagen
1997	Wayne Ford	Ralt-Volkswagen
1998	David Bruce	Reynard-Volkswagen
1999	Rod Anderson	Reynard-Volkswagen
2000	Tom Brickley	Kaditcha-Volkswagen
2001	Ian Black	Reynard-Volkswagen
2002	Ted Dunford (New South Wales Championship)	Reynard-Volkswagen
2002	Troy Chaplin (Queensland Championship)	Ralt RT34 Volkswagen
2003	Ted Dunford	Reynard-Volkswagen
2004	Kevin Lewis	Cheetah-Volkswagen
2005	Greg Hunter	Reynard-Volkswagen
2006	Kevin Lewis	Cheetah-Volkswagen
2007	Edward Gavin	Cheetah-Volkswagen
2008	Greg Muddle	Ralt RT30-Volkswagen
2009	Greg Muddle	Ralt RT30-Volkswagen

== Australian Formula 2 lap records ==
Track	Distance	Driver	Car	Date	Time
Adelaide International Raceway, Long Circuit	2.41 km	Peter Glover	Cheetah		52.5s
Calder Park Raceway, National Circuit	2.28 km	D. Bruce	Reynard 893-Volkswagen	19 May 1996	57.9272s
Calder Park Raceway, Club Circuit		Lucio Cesario	Ralt RT3-Volkswagen		42.0200s
Mallala Motor Sport Park	2.20 km	Barry Ward	Reynard 893-Volkswagen		1m07.3s
Morgan Park Raceway	2.1 km	Barclay Holden	Van Dieman F2	1 March 2008	1m01.4639
Oran Park Raceway, South Circuit	1.96 km	Arthur Abrahams	Reynard 933	18 July 1993	0:39.9000
Sandown Raceway	3.1 km	Barry Ward	Reynard-Volkswagen	19 May 1991	1m:14.47
Winton Motor Raceway, National Circuit	3.0 km	Paul Stephenson	Dallara-Volkswagen	June 1999	1m23.8310s
Symmons Plains Raceway	2.4 km	Jonathan Crooke	Cheetah Mk8 - Judd Golf VW	9 March 1996	54.73s
Baskerville Raceway	2.01 km	Jonathan Crooke	Cheetah Mk8 - Judd Golf VW	16 March 1986	50.24s
Surfers Paradise International Raceway	3.2 km	Jonathan Crooke	Cheetah Mk8 - Judd Golf VW	18 May 1986	1m07.3s
Oran Park	2.62 km	Jonathan Crooke	Cheetah Mk8 - Judd Golf VW	8 June 1986	1m05.8s
Lakeside International Raceway	2.4 km	Jonathan Crooke / Arthur Abrahams	Cheetah Mk8 - Judd Golf VW	15 June 1986	50.6s
Sandown Raceway	3.9 km	Arthur Abrahams	Cheetah Mk8 - Golf VW	14 September 1986	1m40.2s
Amaroo Park	1.946 km	Arthur Abrahams	Cheetah Mk8 - Golf VW	21 June 1987	46.52s
Winton Motor Raceway, Short Circuit	2.03 km	Arthur Abrahams	Ransberg Cheetah Mk8 - Golf VW	December 1988	56.9600s
Eastern Creek Raceway	3.93 km	Arthur Abrahams	Ransberg Cheetah - Golf VW	25 August 1991	1m29.3500s
Wakefield Park	2.2 km	Craig Smith	Cheetah Mk8 - Golf VW	16 September 2001	59.0361s
Phillip Island Grand Prix Circuit	4.445 km	Chas Jacobsen		28 July 1999	1m33.4389s

== List of manufacturers raced in Australian Formula 2 ==
=== Australian manufacturers ===
Arbyen, Argus, ASP, Avanti, B.A.E., Birrana, Bowin, CBS, Cheetah, Crabtree, CRD, Elfin, Fielding, Hardman, HTG, Kaditcha, Liston, Macon, Mantis, Mildren, PBS, Rennmax, Richards, SAM, Sirch, Wren.

=== International manufacturers ===
Brabham, Chevron, Dallara, Lola, Lotus, Magnum, March, McLaren, Ralt, Reynard, Tiga, Van Diemen

== Famous alumni (non-champions) ==
John Bowe, Peter Brock, Alfredo Costanzo, Glenn Seton, Andrew Miedecke.
