= 1984 Australian Formula 2 Championship =

The 1984 Australian Formula 2 Championship was a CAMS sanctioned Australian motor racing title open to cars complying with Australian Formula 2 regulations. The title, which was the 17th Australian Formula 2 Championship, was won by Peter Glover, driving a Cheetah Mk 7 Volkswagen.

== Schedule ==
The championship was contested over a six-round series:

Round	Circuit	State	Date	Format	Round winner	Car
1	Sandown Park	Victoria	19 February	Two races	Neil Israel	Arbyen Volkswagen
2	Oran Park	New South Wales	18 March	Two races	Peter Glover	Cheetah Mk 7 Volkswagen
3	Calder	Victoria	29 April	Two races	Peter Macrow	Cheetah Mk 8 Ford
4	Adelaide International Raceway	South Australia	6 May	Two races	Keith McClelland	Cheetah Mk 8 Volkswagen
5	Mallala Motor Sport Park	South Australia	3 June	Two races	Keith McClelland	Cheetah Mk 8 Volkswagen
6	Amaroo Park	New South Wales	8 July	One race	Peter Glover	Cheetah Mk 7 Volkswagen

The second race of Round 3 at Calder was cancelled due to program delays caused by an accident during a supporting race.

Round 5 at Mallala saw the country South Australian circuit used in a CAMS sanctioned national championship for the first time since 1971.

== Points system ==
Points were awarded on a 30–27–24–21–19–17–15–14–13–12–11–10–9–8–7–6–5 basis to the top 17 finishers in each race. Finishers had to cover at least 75% of the race distance to be awarded points. In multi-race rounds, the aggregate points for each driver were divided by the number of races to determine the actual championship points allocation for the driver at that round.

== Results ==
Position	Driver	No.	Car	Entrant	San	Ora	Cal	Ade	Mal	Ama	Total
1	Peter Glover	13	Cheetah Mk 7 Volkswagen	Peter Glover	19.5	30	13.5	13.5	21	30	127.5
2	Keith McClelland	9	Cheetah Mk 8 Volkswagen	Keith McClelland	12	27	–	30	30	27	126
3	Neil Israel	35	Arbyen Volkswagen	Neil Israel	27	24	–	17	24	21	113
4	Ian Richards	1	Richards 201 Volkswagen	Ian Richards	9.5	21	–	21.5	16.5	19	87.5
5	Terry Ryan	36	Ralt RT1 Ford	Terry Ryan Auto Services P/L	23	11	10.5	17.5	6.5	17	85.5
6	Peter Macrow	25	Cheetah Mk 8 Ford	Repco Engine Parts	–	19	15	25.5	13.5	–	73
7	Craig Sparks	33	Elfin 792 Volkswagen	Craig Sparks	10.5	16	12	17	7	–	62.5
8	Wayne Ford	32	Chevron B42 Ford	Wayne Ford	–	9.5	7.5	–	13	14	44
9	Derek Pingel		Elfin 792 Volkswagen		–	13.5	–	–	–	24	37.5
	Graham Blee	2	Cheetah Mk 6 Toyota	Bell Street Truck Centre	–	16	8.5	–	–	13	37.5
11	Craig Gibbs	10	Cheetah Mk 6 Ford	Keith McDermott	10.5	–	6	5.5	–	15	37
12	Mike Drewer	5	Cheetah Mk 7 Volkswagen	MJ Drewer	11	–	6.5	13.5	5.5	–	36.5
13	Peter Boylan	60	Ralt RT3 Volkswagen	Peter Boylan	16	13	–	–	–	–	29
	Vince McLaughlan	7	Cheetah Mk 8 Isuzu	Kevin McLaughlan	–	–	5.5	–	11.5	12	29
15	David Crabtree	77	Cheetah BMW	David Crabtree	13	11	–	–	4	–	28
16	Brian Sampson	78	Cheetah Mk 8 Ford	Brian Sampson	–	–	9.5	–	16.5	–	26
17	Rob Newman	26	Cheetah Mk 7 Toyota	John Walker Panel Repairs	–	–	–	6	19	–	25
18	David Partridge		Elfin 700		13.5	11	–	–	–	–	24.5
19	Clive Millis	7	Hardman JH1 Ford		21	–	–	–	–	–	21
20	Mike Holmes	22	Elfin 700 Volkswagen	Mike Holmes	–	–	–	–	15.5	–	15.5
21	Colin Fulton		Cheetah Volkswagen		15	–	–	–	–	–	15
22	Greg Ferrall	8	Elfin GE225 Volkswagen	Greg Ferrall	–	–	–	10.5	–	–	10.5
23	Tony Armstrong		Cheetah Volkswagen		10	–	–	–	–	–	10
24	Bronte Rundle	21	Argus 832 Datsun	Argus Engineering	–	–	–	–	7.5	–	7.5
	Gregg Taylor	49	Cheetah Toyota	AG Taylor	–	–	–	7.5	–	–	7.5
26	Mark Potter	15	Elfin 700	Mark Potter	–	–	7	–	–	–	7
27	Peter Jones		Cheetah Mk 8 Ford		–	–	–	6.5	–	–	6.5
28	Mark Buik		Elfin 620 Ford		6	–	–	–	–	–	6
29	Peter Doulman		Avanti F2 Ford		–	4	–	–	–	–	4

- Israel did not receive points for his 12th-place finish in Race 1 of Round 3 as he had completed less than the required 75% of the total race distance.
- Glover did not receive points for his 12th-place finish in Race 1 of Round 4 as he had completed less than the required 75% of the total race distance.
