= 1977 Australian Formula 2 Championship =

The 1977 Australian Formula 2 Championship was a motor racing competition for Australian Formula 2 cars. It was authorised as an Australian National Title by the Confederation of Australian Motor Sport. The championship was contested over a single race which was staged at the Sandown International Motor Racing Circuit in Victoria, Australia on 17 April 1977. It was the 11th Australian Formula 2 Championship.

The championship was won by Peter Larner driving an Elfin 700 Ford.

== Results ==
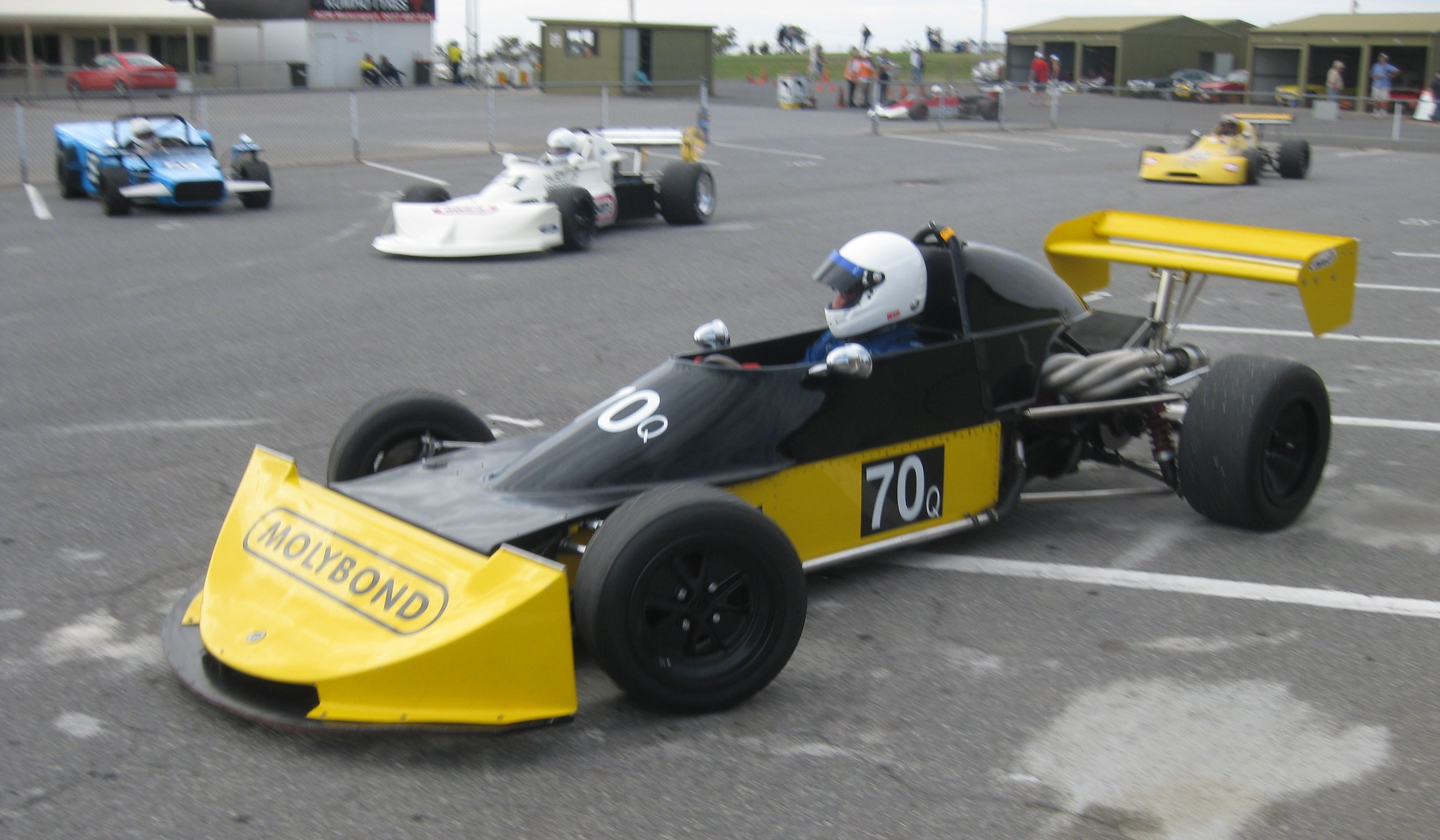
Peter Larner won the 1977 Australian Formula 2 Championship at the wheel of an Elfin 700, similar to that pictured above.

Position	Driver	No.	Car	Entrant	Laps
1	Peter Larner	83	Elfin 700 Ford	P. Larner	26
2	Wolfgang Prejawa	26	Birrana 274 Ford	W. Prejawa	26
3	Clive Millis	4	Elfin 630 Ford	Clive Millis Motors P/L	26
4	Rob Butcher	52	ASP F3 Ford	S. A. Airconditioning Centre	26
5	John Davis	21	Lola T360 Ford	Grace Bros Race Team	25
6	Ian Fergusson	15	Bowin P6 Ford	I. Fergusson	25
7	Craig McAllister	10	Elfin 622 Ford	C. McAllister	25
8	Werner Bekker	8	Elfin 620FF Ford	Carac Pty. Ltd.	23
DNF	Graeme Smith	5	Birrana 274 Ford	Graeme Smith Mercedes-Benz	21
DNF	Graeme Crawford	1	Birrana 273 Ford	G. Crawford	14
DNF	Kurt Seeburg	69	Brabham BT35 Ford	K. Seeburg	9
DNF	John Millard	11	Brabham BT35 Ford	Chrystal Millard	

== Notes ==
- Fastest lap: Peter Larner, 1m 08.6s
