= Adelaide International Raceway =

Race track in Adelaide, South Australia

AIR
- Full Circuit (1972–present)
- Location: Port Wakefield Road, Virginia, South Australia
- Coordinates: 34°41′57″S 138°33′53″E
- Owner: Bob Jane Corporation
- Operator: Australian Motorsport Club Limited
- Broke ground: 1970
- Opened: 9 January 1972; 54 years ago
- Major events: Former: Australian Touring Car Championship (1972–1988); Tasman Series (1972–1975); Rothmans International Series (1976–1979); Australian Drivers' Championship (1972–1973, 1982–1984, 1986, 1988); Australian Formula 2 (1972–1974, 1981–1987); Australian Sports Car Championship (1972–1974, 1977, 1982–1983, 1985–1986, 1988); Australian GT (1982–1985)
- Website: https://www.adelaideraceway.com.au

Full Circuit (1972–present)
- Surface: Asphalt
- Length: 2.410 km (1.498 mi)
- Turns: 8
- Banking: Turns 8–9: 5° Front straight: 0° Back straight (Bowl): 3°
- Race lap record: 0:49.500 (Alan Jones, Lola T332, 1977, Formula 5000)

Short Circuit (1972–present)
- Length: 1.770 km (1.100 mi)
- Turns: 6
- Banking: Turns 5–6: 5° Front straight: 0° Back straight (Bowl): 3°
- Race lap record: 0:43.9 (Mike Trengove, Formula 2)

Speedway Super Bowl (1972–present)
- Length: 0.805 km (0.500 mi)
- Turns: 4
- Banking: Turns: 5° Front straight: 0° Back straight: 3°
- Race lap record: 0:22.7017 (Terry Wyhoon, Ford Thunderbird, 1998, NASCAR)

The Adelaide International Raceway (also known as Adelaide International or AIR) is a permanent circuit owned by Australian Motorsport Club Limited under the auspices of the Bob Jane Corporation. The circuit is located 26 km (16 mi) north of Adelaide in South Australia on Port Wakefield Road at Virginia, and is adjacent to Adelaide's premier car racing Dirt track racing venue, Speedway City. AIR is owned by the Bob Jane Corporation and run by the Australian Motorsport Club Ltd.

== History ==
Adelaide International Raceway (AIR) was built by Surfers Paradise businessman Keith Williams in 1972. Williams also owned the Mallala Race Circuit and Surfers Paradise International Raceway. Williams owned the track, which remained in an almost 'raw state' until purchased in 1982 by the Bob Jane Corporation.

The race track can be used in four different configurations. The full circuit is 2.410-kilometre (1.498 mi), the short circuit is 1.770 km (1.100 mi), the Speedway Super Bowl is 0.805 km (0.500 mi), and the drag strip is 0.25 mi (0.40 km) long. The track is dominated by its 920 m (1,010 yd) long main straight which is also the drag strip and the front straight of the Super Bowl. As it is a drag strip, the front straight of the circuit is wider than the rest of the track. Like most Australian circuits at its time of construction, AIR raced and still races clockwise, though the Super Bowl, with speedway meetings and NASCAR races in the 1990s, is the only part of the circuit to run state or national championship races anti-clockwise.

Both the Speedway Super Bowl (more commonly referred to as "The Bowl"), and the Drag Strip have the capacity to run night meetings due to the lights that run around the Super Bowl and down the circuits main straight. The spectator viewing areas extend from the final turn and all the way down the main straight. There are also spectator mounds from turn 3 around to turn 6, and then from the outside of turn 7 (the bowl) and all along the back straight. The proximity of the final turn of the bowl to Port Wakefield Road means that spectator mounds can not be placed there.

Starting in 1994 with the removal of the old stands along the main straight and replacing them with spectator mounds, upgrades have been made through the years in a bid to bring AIR back to being a regularly used national motor racing venue. The old timing tower and VIP facilities were pulled down and replaced with several new buildings and a paved VIP area for corporate sponsors was added. A spectator mound and a small, uncovered grandstand, located on the infield of the Super Bowl directly behind pit lane, have also been added in recent years.

Adelaide International Raceway also raced top level motorbike racing. Series that utilised the circuit included the Swann International Series featuring riders such as Graeme Crosby, who won the 1980 series race, and Gregg Hansford. There was an annual 3-Hour race held at the circuit until the mid-1980s that was televised nationally on the ABC, but once the covenant was lifted on the Mallala Raceway, safety concerns about the Super Bowl having no runoff area on the outside of the track (from the entrance to the Bowl until end of the main straight, approximately 1.3 km (0.81 mi), the outside of the track was all concrete wall with zero runoff, though tyre bundles were placed on the inside of the wall around the final turn onto the main straight) saw bike racing move to Mallala instead. AIR continues to run bikes in drag racing with Top Bike and Pro Stock Motorcycle both being regulars at drag racing events.

== Circuit racing ==
From 1972 to 1988 the Adelaide International Raceway was South Australia's major motor racing circuit, due to a covenant placed on Mallala preventing any motor sport activities there (the covenant had been done away with by 1982). AIR regularly hosted rounds of the Australian Touring Car Championship and endurance races of the Australian Manufacturers' Championship (later known as the 'Championship of Makes'). The Adelaide track also hosted rounds of the famous Tasman Series, the Rothmans International Series, as well as other CAMS sanctioned national championships, including the Australian Drivers' Championship, Australian Formula 2 Championship, the Australian Sports Car Championship, Australian Sports Sedan Championship, and the Australian GT Championship.

With six of the full circuits nine turns being right handers, those being turn 1, which was also the hardest braking point of the track after the fastest cars such as Formula 5000's regularly reached speeds of over 270 km/h (170 mph) on the long straight (by 1988 the turbocharged Ford Sierra RS500 touring cars run by Dick Johnson Racing were reaching 258 km/h (160 mph)), and the sweeping turns 2 and 3, plus the high speed bowl section, gave Adelaide International a reputation for being hard on tyres, specifically the outside (left hand) tyres which generally took a hammering through the long turn 1, 2 & 3 right hand sweeper and also on the turn 9 bowl. This was due to the longer periods of high speed cornering with the cars and suspensions loaded to the outside. For the longer national championship races, such as the 40 or 60 lap ATCC races and the end of year 125 lap touring car endurance race, this made tyre choice and suspension settings a critical part of success at AIR. Dick Johnson noted during practice for AIR's 1988 ATCC round that after the 60 lap race even the lighter and significantly slower Gemini's would be suffering with worn tyres.

AIR also has an unusual set up for the Pits. While the pit lane is located on the inside of the track coming onto the main straight (cars enter pit lane at the end of the Super Bowl's back straight), the cars actually enter the track from the paddock through the pit gate on the outside of the track at the end of turn 9 (the gate is closed and forms part of the outside retaining wall during races). This means that the main paddock for AIR is located on the outside of the main straight behind the officials tower and spectator mounds. This is despite there being an open and unused area of approximately 21,500m^{2} located within the Super Bowl behind pit lane (one reason for this was so as to not obstruct the viewing from the pit straight spectator stands and mounds from which the entire circuit could be viewed, though binoculars are usually needed to see the far end of the circuit which is almost 1 km (0.62 mi) away from the start/finish line).

The outright lap record for the full 2.410 km (1.498 mi) circuit is held by Australia's 1980 Formula One World Drivers' Champion Alan Jones at 49.5 seconds. Jones set the record during the 1977 Rothmans International Series driving a Lola T332-Chevrolet Formula 5000. Jones also holds the GT lap record of the circuit with a time of 51.7 seconds while driving a Porsche 935 in the 1982 Australian GT Championship. Circuit owner Bob Jane also holds an AIR track record, co-holding the Sports Sedan lap record with former local driver John Briggs with a time of 54.1 seconds set in 1981. Both drivers set the time in the same race on the same day, with both driving a Chevrolet Monza. Jane's DeKon Monza was built and prepared by Norm Beechey's former mechanic Pat Purcell while the Briggs Monza was built by Adelaide-based K&A Engineering.

The lap record for the 1.770 km (1.100 mi), 7 turn Short Circuit is 43.9 seconds, jointly held by Mark Trengrove in a Formula 2, and local Adelaide Sports Sedan driver Mick Monterosso. To set his lap time, Monterosso drove the Adelaide built (by K&A Engineering) Group A, Group C and IMSA specification Veskanda Chevrolet sports car used by John Bowe to dominate the 1986 Australian Sports Car Championship. The Veskanda is generally regarded as Australia's fastest ever race car.

== Speedway Super Bowl ==
In the early 1970s, and following the American NASCAR influence which at the time was drawing record crowds, paved short track speedway was becoming popular in Australia (for many years dirt track speedway already had a big following) and with the Speedway Super Bowl, Adelaide a ready made track. Compared to the now closed 440 m (480 yd) long Liverpool Speedway in Sydney and the 410 m (450 yd) Tralee Speedway in Canberra, the Super Bowl is a true ½ mile (805 metres (880 yd) track, fast and with room on the almost 180m long straights for cars to reach higher speeds. The Super Bowl's longer than 220m turns are banked slightly at approximately 5°, making cornering faster, with the exception of turn 1 for running clockwise on the Bowl which is generally flat - necessary due to the front straight also being the drag strip, the main straight of the road course and the usual exit of pit lane. The turns of the bowl being banked made turn 7 of the full circuit (turn 5 on the short course) more than slightly off-camber as cars entered the Bowl which saw numerous top drivers spin there over the years including Graham McRae, Frank Matich, David Hobbs and Allan Moffat.

The Speedway Super Bowl held winter race meetings and was first used on 16 June 1974 when a large crowd or around 10,000 turned up to see competitors from Rowley Park Speedway drive on the new asphalt speedway. It quickly became apparent that cars built for the 358 metres (392 yd) dirt track speedway were out of their depth on the ½ mile Super Bowl, with the Modified Rods (Sprintcars) reaching over 170 km/h (110 mph) on the straights when they were only used to about 80 km/h (50 mph) on dirt. Sedan driver Jim Curnow was knocked unconscious when his Holden Torana hit the concrete retaining wall and chronic Understeer was the biggest complaint of almost all drivers with cars generally being set up for dirt and not asphalt. Some sedan drivers then started building cars that were suited to racing on the Super Bowl with a space frame chassis, well tuned V8 engines and wide slick tyres (such as those which were racing successfully at Liverpool) and these cars quickly dominated. The problem was that there were too few of them with some races only having five or six competitors. Most drivers eventually decided it was more fun racing on the dirt at Rowley Park and with crowd numbers dwindling to around 2,000 due to both the tracks location (26 km (16 mi) north of Adelaide) and the dwindling number of competitors, speedway meetings stopped being held after 1976. Speedway Super Sedans did return to AIR in the late 1980s for some daytime meetings, however crowds were down.

In an ironic twist, when Rowley Park ceased operating in April 1979, Adelaide's new speedway venue Speedway Park (now called Speedway City), was opened adjacent to AIR in October 1979, the crowds returned despite the same travel time to get there as for AIR.

From 1990, the Super Bowl became a regular and popular short track venue for AUSCAR and NASCAR racing during the 1990s, with crowds of up to 15,000 attending the annual Adelaide round of the Australian Championships. The Super Bowl was, and still is the only race circuit still in operation in Australia other than the Calder Park Thunderdome where the race cars can run on a paved oval track, with both tracks currently owned the Bob Jane Corporation. The outright lap record for the Super Bowl of 22.7012 was set in a NSACAR by Terry Whyhoon driving a Ford Thunderbird during the 1997/98 Goodyear Australian SuperSpeedway Series.

The fastest qualifying and race laps set during speedway meetings was set in 1976 by John Hughes (later the founder of World Series Sprintcars) driving a V8 powered HJ Holden One Tonner ute chassis covered by HJ Monaro bodywork. His times were 23.8 for qualifying and 23.2 seconds race lap, which were not much slower than the more powerful (with 20+ years of engine, tyre and suspension development) NASCAR and AUSCAR times set during the late 1990s. Indeed, Hughes' qualifying time of 23.8 in 1976 would have placed him 8th on the NASCAR starting grid for the SuperSpeedway Series meeting some 22 years later (the two categories both raced anti-clockwise).

Compared to the Thunderdome where the NASCAR's would lap at speeds over 140 mph (230 km/h), the fastest times recorded on the Super Bowl would be around 78 mph (126 km/h). To underline the speed difference of AIR compared to the Thunderdome, the terminal speed of the NASCAR's on the shorter AIR straights was around 117 mph (188 km/h) which was some 5 mph (8.0 km/h) slower than the cars were doing on the high banked turns at Calder.

== Drag racing ==
With its 920 m (1,010 yd) long front straight, it was always intended that Adelaide International Raceway would host top level drag racing, finally giving Adelaide a national venue that could compete with (at the time) Calder Park (Melbourne), Castlereagh (Sydney), Ravenswood (Perth), and the Keith Williams owned Surfers Paradise Raceway which, like AIR and Calder, incorporated a drag strip into the circuit design.

AIR played host to numerous national drag racing championships through the years, as well as regular off-street racing for road cars. The track then went unused and had seen no drag racing since the late 1990s, with racing making a return in November 2011. This saw Top Doorslammers run the 1/8th mile track for the first time in over 10 years and gives hope for drag racing's future in South Australia.

On 13–15 April 2012 top line drag racing made its return to AIR for the first ANDRA meeting at the track for over 10 years with he ANDRA Pro Series 1000, which marked the Australian debut (albeit for all classes, not just the nitromethane categories) of 1,000 ft (300 m) drag racing. ANDRA Top Fuel will continue to compete over a quarter-mile (402m) distance, but short tracks such as Adelaide will only be to 1,000 feet.

In 2021, Australian National Drag Racing Association announced the establishment of an annual Australian Drag Racing Championship series, with ASID as one of five venues across the country to host a round in the inaugural season.

== Test track ==
Since its opening in 1972, Adelaide International has been used as a test track for various race teams including the Melbourne-based Holden Dealer Team, as well as Adelaide based manufacturer Holden. Also, due to it being closer to Adelaide than Mallala, AIR is also used by the South Australian Police for driver training and car compliance testing.

During the years that the Formula One World Championship held the Australian Grand Prix on the Adelaide Street Circuit (1985–1995), AIR was used for driver training for the annual Celebrity Race held as a support event for the Grand Prix. In the early years of the Adelaide AGP, AIR was also used by some Formula One teams as a shakedown circuit, though this only lasted until 1986.

== Recent use ==
The entire track was resurfaced in early 2008, restricting use even further with a possibility of events being held from later in the year.

In the Jan/Feb 2012 edition of Australian Muscle Car Magazine it was reported that Keith Williams, the founder and original owner of the Adelaide International Raceway, had died at the age of 82.

AIR is currently used for Drifting, with the G1 Drift Competition and Drift Supercup holding events at the circuit.

== Australian Touring Car Championship round winners ==
Note: In both the 1976 and 1977 Australian Touring Car Championships there were two rounds held at Adelaide International Raceway. The earlier round was a 'sprint' event and later round was a 250 km endurance race.

The last Group C ATCC round winner at AIR was Allan Grice driving a VH Commodore SS on 1 July 1984, this was also the last ATCC race held under the locally developed Group C rules. During the race Peter Brock (who finished second) set the outright touring car lap record. The last ATCC race held at AIR was on 1 May 1988 with Dick Johnson winning the treble. He qualified his Shell sponsored Ford Sierra RS500 on pole, claimed the fastest lap of the race (the Group A lap record), and won from his teammate John Bowe.

Races listed in Italics denote that season's ATCC endurance race.

Year	Driver	Car	Entrant
Improved Production
1972	(Australia) Bob Jane	Chevrolet Camaro ZL-1	Bob Jane Racing
Group C
1973	(Australia) Peter Brock	Holden LJ Torana GTR XU-1	Holden Dealer Team
1974	(Australia) Peter Brock	Holden LH Torana SL/R 5000	Holden Dealer Team
1975	(Australia) Colin Bond	Holden LH Torana SL/R 5000 L34	Holden Dealer Team
1976	(Canada) Allan Moffat	Ford XB Falcon GT	Allan Moffat Racing
1976	(Australia) Allan Grice	Holden LH Torana SL/R 5000 L34	Craven Mild Racing
1977	(Australia) Colin Bond	Ford XB Falcon GT	Moffat Ford Dealers
1977	(Canada) Allan Moffat	Ford XC Falcon GS500	Moffat Ford Dealers
1978	(Australia) Colin Bond	Ford XC Falcon GS500	Moffat Ford Dealers
1979	(Australia) Bob Morris	Holden LX Torana SS 5000 A9X	Ron Hodgson Motors
1980	(Australia) Kevin Bartlett	Chevrolet Camaro Z28	Nine Network Racing Team
1981	(Australia) Peter Brock	Holden VC Commodore	Marlboro Holden Dealer Team
1982	(Australia) Dick Johnson	Ford XD Falcon	Palmer Tube Mills
1983	(Australia) Peter Brock	Holden VH Commodore SS	Marlboro Holden Dealer Team
1984	(Australia) Allan Grice	Holden VH Commodore SS	Roadways Racing
Group A
1985	(New Zealand) Jim Richards	BMW 635 CSi	JPS Team BMW
1986	(New Zealand) Robbie Francevic	Volvo 240T	Volvo Dealer Team
1987	(Australia) Dick Johnson	Ford Sierra RS Cosworth	Shell Ultra Hi-Tech Racing Team
1988	(Australia) Dick Johnson	Ford Sierra RS500	Shell Ultra-Hi Racing

== Adelaide 250/300 ==
The AIR endurance race was first run in 1972 as a 250-mile race (397 km) before being shortened to 300 km (187.5 mi) in 1978 and became part of the "Australian Championship of Makes" until 1980 then becoming part of the Australian Endurance Championship. The first endurance race, the Chesterfield 250, run on 27 August 1972 for Series Production Touring Cars, was won by Colin Bond driving a Holden Dealer Team (HDT) LJ Torana GTR XU-1. The last enduro, the Humes Guardrail 300, run on 20 November 1983 under CAMS Group C regulations, was won by Peter Brock in his HDT VH Commodore SS.

The 1976 and 1977 races were run as part of the Australian Touring Car Championship.

Year	Driver	Car	Entrant
Group E Series Production
1972	(Australia) Colin Bond	Holden LJ Torana GTR XU-1	Holden Dealer Team
Group C
1973	(Australia) Fred Gibson	Ford XA Falcon GT Hardtop	Ford Motor Company of Australia
1974	(Australia) Colin Bond	Holden LH Torana SL/R 5000	Holden Dealer Team
1975	(Australia) Colin Bond	Holden LH Torana SL/R 5000 L34	Holden Dealer Team
1976	(Australia) Allan Grice	Holden LH Torana SL/R 5000 L34	Craven Mild Racing
1977	(Canada) Allan Moffat	Ford XC Falcon GS500 Hardtop	Moffat Ford Dealers
1978	(Australia) Colin Bond	Ford XC Falcon Cobra	Moffat Ford Dealers
1979	(Australia) Allan Grice	Holden LX Torana SS A9X Hatchback	Craven Mild Racing
1980	(Australia) Peter Brock	Holden VB Commodore	Marlboro Holden Dealer Team
1981	(Australia) Peter Brock	Holden VC Commodore	Marlboro Holden Dealer Team
1982	(Canada) Allan Moffat	Mazda RX-7	Peter Stuyvesant International Racing
1983	(Australia) Peter Brock	Holden VH Commodore SS	Marlboro Holden Dealer Team

== National Championship Rounds ==
=== Australian Drivers' Championship ===
Adelaide International played host to seven rounds of the Australian Drivers' Championship between 1972 and 1988. From 1989 the Drivers' Championship (also known as the CAMS Gold Star) moved to Mallala.

Year	Driver	Car	Entrant
Australian Formula 1
1972	(Australia) Kevin Bartlett	Lola T300 Chevrolet	Shell / Chesterfield Racing
1973	(Australia) John McCormack	Elfin MR5 Repco-Holden	Ansett Team Elfin
1982	(Australia) Andrew Miedecke	Ralt RT4/81 Ford	Miedecke Motorsport
1983	(Australia) Alfredo Costanzo	Tiga FA81 Ford	Porsche Cars Australia
Formula Mondial
1984	(Australia) Alfredo Costanzo	Tiga FA81 Ford	Porsche Cars Australia
1986	(Australia) Peter Hopwood	Ralt RT4/85 Ford	Menage Racing Team
Formula 2
1988	(Australia) Glenn Seton	Ralt RT4 Nissan	Dave Thompson

=== Australian Sports Sedan / GT Championship ===
AIR played host to a round of the Australian Sports Sedan Championship on 6 occasions between 1976 and 1981. The ASSC was then changed to the Australian GT Championship in 1982 with AIR hosting a round each year until the demise of the AGTC in 1985.

Year	Driver	Car	Entrant
1976	(Australia) Frank Gardner	Chevrolet Corvair	John Player Racing
1977	(Australia) Frank Gardner	Chevrolet Corvair Corsa	John Player Racing
1978	(New Zealand) Jim Richards	Ford XC Falcon Hardtop	Jim Richards Motor Racing
1979	(Australia) Tony Edmondson	Alfa Romeo Alfetta GTV Repco-Holden	Donald Elliott
1980	(Australia) Allan Grice	BMW 318i Turbo	Craven Mild Racing
1981	(Australia) Tony Edmondson	Alfa Romeo Alfetta GTV Chevrolet	Donald Elliott
1982	(Australia) Alan Jones	Porsche 935/80	Porsche Cars Australia
1983	(Australia) Rusty French	Porsche 935/80	John Sands Racing
1984	(Australia) Allan Grice	Chevrolet Monza	Re-Car Racing
1985	(Australia) Bryan Thomson	Chevrolet Monza	Thomson-Fowler Motorsport

=== Australian Sports Car Championship ===
AIR played host to a round of the Australian Sports Car Championship on 9 occasions between 1972 and 1988.

Year	Driver	Car	Entrant
1972	(Australia) John Harvey	McLaren M6B Repco	Bob Jane Racing
1973	(Australia) Lionel Ayers	Rennmax Repco	Lionel Ayers
1974	(Australia) Lionel Ayers	Rennmax Repco	Lionel Ayers
1977	(Australia) John Latham	Porsche Carrera RSR	Kodak Film
1982	(Australia) Chris Clearihan	Kaditcha Chevrolet	Chris Clearihan
1983	(Australia) Peter Hopwood	Kaditcha Chevrolet	Steve Webb
1985	(Australia) Terry Hook	Lola T610 Chevrolet	Terry Hook
1986	(Australia) John Bowe	Veskanda C1 Chevrolet	Bernard van Elsen
1988	(Australia) Brian Smith	Alfa Romeo Alfetta GTV Chevrolet	Basil Ricciardello

=== Australian Formula 2 Championship ===
Adelaide International played host to eleven rounds of the Australian Formula 2 Championship between 1972 and 1988.

Year	Driver	Car	Entrant
1972	(Australia) Larry Perkins	Elfin 600B/E Ford	Provincial Motors
1973	(Australia) Enno Busselmann	Birrana 273 Ford	Bob & Marj Brown
1974	(Australia) Bob Muir	Birrana 273 Ford	Bob & Marj Brown
1981	(Australia) Lucio Cesario	Ralt RT3 Volkswagen	Formula 1 Automotive
1982	(Australia) Peter Macrow	Cheetah Mk 7 Holden	Peter Macrow
1983	(Australia) Peter Glover	Cheetah Mk 7D Isuzu	Peter Glover
1984	(Australia) Keith McClelland	Cheetah Mk 8 Judd-Volkswagen	Keith McClelland
1985	(Australia) Peter Glover	Cheetah Mk 8 Judd-Volkswagen	Peter Glover
1986	(Australia) Jon Crooke	Cheetah Mk 8 Judd-Volkswagen	Jonathon Crooke
1987	(Australia) Derek Pingel	Cheetah Mk 8 Judd-Volkswagen	Derek Pingel
1988*	(Australia) Glenn Seton	Ralt RT4 Nissan	Dave Thompson

* 1988 was a round of the Australian Drivers' Championship

=== Tasman Series ===
Adelaide International played host to four rounds of the Tasman Series between 1972 and 1975.

Year	Driver	Car	Entrant
1972	(United Kingdom) David Hobbs	McLaren M22 Chevrolet	Hobbs Racing London
1973	(Australia) John McCormack	Elfin MR5 Repco-Holden	Ansett Team Elfin
1974	(Australia) Warwick Brown	Lola T332 Chevrolet	Pat Burke Racing
1975	(New Zealand) Graeme Lawrence	Lola T332 Chevrolet	Marlboro/Wix/Singapore Airlines

=== Rothmans International Series ===
Adelaide International played host to four rounds of the Rothmans International Series between 1976 and 1979. Alan Jones driving a Chevrolet powered Lola T332, set the full circuit's still standing (as of June 2025) outright lap record of 49.5 seconds during the 1977 race.

Year	Driver	Car	Entrant
1976	(New Zealand) Ken Smith	Lola T330 Chevrolet	La Valise Racing
1977	(Australia) Alan Jones	Lola T332 Chevrolet	Theodore Racing; Bill Patterson Motors
1978	(Australia) Warwick Brown	Lola T332 Chevrolet	Racing Team VDS
1979	(Australia) Alfredo Costanzo	Lola T430 Chevrolet	Porsche Cars Australia

== Lap records ==
As of April 2015. Unless otherwise stated all records are for the long 2.410 km (1.498 mi) circuit. The official race lap records at Adelaide International Raceway are listed as:

Class	Time	Driver	Vehicle	Date
Full Circuit (1972–present): 2.410 km (1.498 mi)
Formula 5000	0:49.5	(Australia) Alan Jones	Lola T332	26 February 1977
Group A Sports Car (Over 3 litres); Group C Sports Car	0:49.85	(Australia) John Bowe	Veskanda C1	6 July 1986
Formula Pacific/Mondial	0:50.2	(Australia) Alfredo Costanzo	Tiga FA81	4 July 1982
Group A Sports Car (1.6 to 3 litres)	0:51.67	(Australia) Bap Romano	Kaditcha-K583	1 May 1983
Group 5	0:51.7	(Australia) Alan Jones	935 K3	20 November 1983
Formula 4000/OzBoss	0:52.0891	(Australia) Derek Pingel	Reynard 95D	9 July 2006
Group B Sports Sedans (Over 2-litre)	0:54.1	(Australia) Bob Jane (Australia) John Briggs	Chevrolet Monza; Chevrolet Monza	25 October 1981
Group 7	0:56.2	(Australia) John Harvey	McLaren M6B Repco	9 April 1972
250cc Superkart	0:56.28	(Australia) Barbarah Hepworth	Zip Eagle-Rotax	9 July 1989
Group C Touring car (3001–6000cc)	0:56.4	(Australia) Peter Brock	Holden VH Commodore SS	1 July 1984
Group C Touring car (up to 3000cc)	0:57.8	(Australia) George Fury	Nissan Bluebird Turbo	1 May 1983
Group A Touring car (Over 2500cc)	0:57.87	(Australia) Dick Johnson	Ford Sierra RS500	1 May 1988
Group 4	0:57.9	(Australia) Alan Hamilton	Porsche 906P	9 April 1972
Group A Touring car (Under 2500cc)	0:58.82	(New Zealand) Jim Richards	BMW M3	3 May 1987
Formula Ford	0:59.6	(Australia) David Roberts	Van Diemen RF87	1 May 1988
Group 3E	1:04.6492	(Australia) Luke Searle	BMW 130	9 July 2006
Group N Historic Touring Cars	1:05.33	(Australia) Tino Leo	Ford Mustang	1 May 1988
HQ Holdens	1:09.81	(Australia) David Lines	Holden HQ Kingswood	23 March 1997
Short Circuit: 1.770 km (1972–present) : 1.770 km (1.100 mi)
Group A Sports Car (Over 3 litres); Group C Sports Car	0:43.9	(Australia) Mick Monterosso	Veskanda C1	26 November 1988
Speedway Super Bowl (1972–present): 0.805 km (0.500 mi)
Stock car racing	0:22.7017	(Australia) Terry Wyhoon	Ford Thunderbird	1998
Super Sedans	0:23.2	(Australia) John Hughes	Holden HJ Monaro	1976
