= Baskerville Raceway =

Motor racing circuit in Tasmania

- Full Circuit (1958–present)
- Location: 473 Baskerville Rd Old Beach Tasmania
- Coordinates: 42°44′44″S 147°17′44″E
- Owner: Motorsports Tasmania
- Opened: 1 February 1958; 68 years ago
- Major events: Current: Baskerville Historics; Former: Australian Improved Production Nationals (2006, 2019); Aussie Racing Cars (2006, 2018); Australian GT (1982)

Full Circuit (1958–present)
- Length: 2.010 km (1.249 mi)
- Turns: 9
- Race lap record: 0:48.8269 ( (Australia) Josh Kean, Benetton B186, 2018, F1)

Baskerville Raceway is a 2.010 km (1.249 mi) permanent motor racing circuit located at 473 Baskerville Rd, Old Beach - a northern suburb of Hobart, Tasmania, Australia. Founded in 1954, the Hobart Sporting Car Club built the circuit in a natural amphitheatre on land provided by Calvin Morrisby (after whom turn 7 is named). The circuit was officially opened on 9 February 1958 by then Tasmanian Premier Robert Cosgrove with 20,000 spectators in attendance, and has been operating continuously ever since. Baskerville is the second-oldest continuously operating motor racing venue in Australia, with only Mount Panorama (which opened in 1938) being older.

== History ==
Previously, Baskerville had hosted the Winfield 25's Touring Car Challenge, Australian Sports Car Championship, Australian Formula 2 Championship, Australian Road Racing Championships (motorcycles), Australian Superbike Championships and other races. Baskerville was the location for the 2006 and 2019 Australian Improved Production Nationals and for the 2009 Formula Vee Nationals, with the latter won by Daniel Reynolds in a Sabre 01.

Baskerville Raceway hosted the inaugural Tasmanian Historic Motorcycle Championships from 25 to 27 November 2011.

In recent years Baskerville Raceway has hosted the Baskerville Historics, the largest event at Baskerville Raceway. The event includes both cars and bikes over a three-day event, and has brought the likes of former V8 Supercars driver Glen Seton and current co-owner of V8 Supercar team Prodrive racing Australia, Rusty French.

In 2012 the owning club, Hobart Sporting Car Club, launched the Baskerville Foundation, a fundraising initiative to bring the circuit to a more modern standard with the ultimate goal of a full resurface of the track.

In 2015 the circuit gained a naming rights sponsor in Pepsi Max, with the circuit changing its name to Pepsi Max Baskerville Raceway

The circuit now holds several events including the Tasmanian Circuit Racing Championship, the Baskerville Historics, the Baskerville 2-Hour Motorcycle Race and several smaller events. The Circuit also hosts several non-Motorsport events such as the Raw Challenge.

In January 2021, the circuit also hosted non-championship round for the Touring Car Masters, TCR Australia Touring Car Series, and Trans-Am Australia Series after their first round in Symmons Plains Raceway.

== Motorcycle Racing and Track Days ==
Motorcycle racing and public ride days are currently run by the Sports Riders Club of Tasmania (SRCT), one of only two club-run ride days in Australia.

== Lap records ==
As of September 2024, the fastest official race lap records at the Baskerville Raceway are listed as:

Category	Time	Driver	Vehicle	Date
Full Circuit (1958–present): 2.010 km (1.249 mi)
Formula One	0:48.8269	Josh Kean	Benetton B186	23 September 2018
Formula 5000	0:48.8869	Jason White	McLaren M10A	23 September 2018
Formula Mondial	0:50.16	John Bowe	Ralt RT4	21 February 1982
Australian Formula 2	0:50.24	Jonathan Crooke	Cheetah Mk 8	16 March 1986
Sports Sedans	0:51.4048	Brad Sheriff	Nissan Skyline	22 October 2022
Trans-Am Australia	0:53.1265	Aaron Seton	Ford Mustang	30 January 2021
TCR Touring Car	0:53.9170	Aaron Cameron	Peugeot 308 TCR	30 January 2021
Touring Car Masters	0:55.5505	Adam Garwood	Chevrolet Camaro RS	30 January 2021
Improved Production Cars	0:56.1829	Jason House	BMW M3 (E92)	20 April 2024
Group C	0:56.80	Steve Masterton	Ford Falcon XE	25 November 1984
Aussie Racing Cars	0:57.2485	Joel Heinrich	Nissan Altima	20 May 2006
Excel Cup	1:04.1150	Oliver Wickham	Hyundai Excel	21 April 2024
HQ Holden	1:05.7848	Phil Ashlin	HQ Holden	16 August 2026

== See also ==
- Sport in Tasmania
