= Brian Shead =

Australian racing driver, constructor, and administrator (1937–2020)

Brian Shead (1937–2020) was an Australian racing driver, constructor and administrator, best known for designing, engineering, constructing and driving Cheetah Racing Cars.

From May 1970 to February 1980, Shead competed in 293 events, from which he achieved 112 wins, 228 podium places, 85 fastest laps and 30 lap records. His racing career culminated in 1979 when he won a closely contested Australian Formula 2 championship driving one of his own Cheetah Mk6s. Shead’s 1988 win of the Australian Drivers’ Championship and CAMS Gold Star was one of the five consecutive Formula 2 titles achieved with his Cheetah products.

Shead was one of the driving forces behind the establishment of Australian Formula 2 and Formula Holden. Shead worked with the Federation Internationale de l’Automobile (FIA) and inspected top-grade race tracks around the world. He was the chairman of the National Track Safety Committee for the Confederation of Australian Motorsport, and a life member of CAMS.

Shead died on 30 December 2020 due to illness.
