= Cheetah Racing Cars =

Australian race car manufacturer

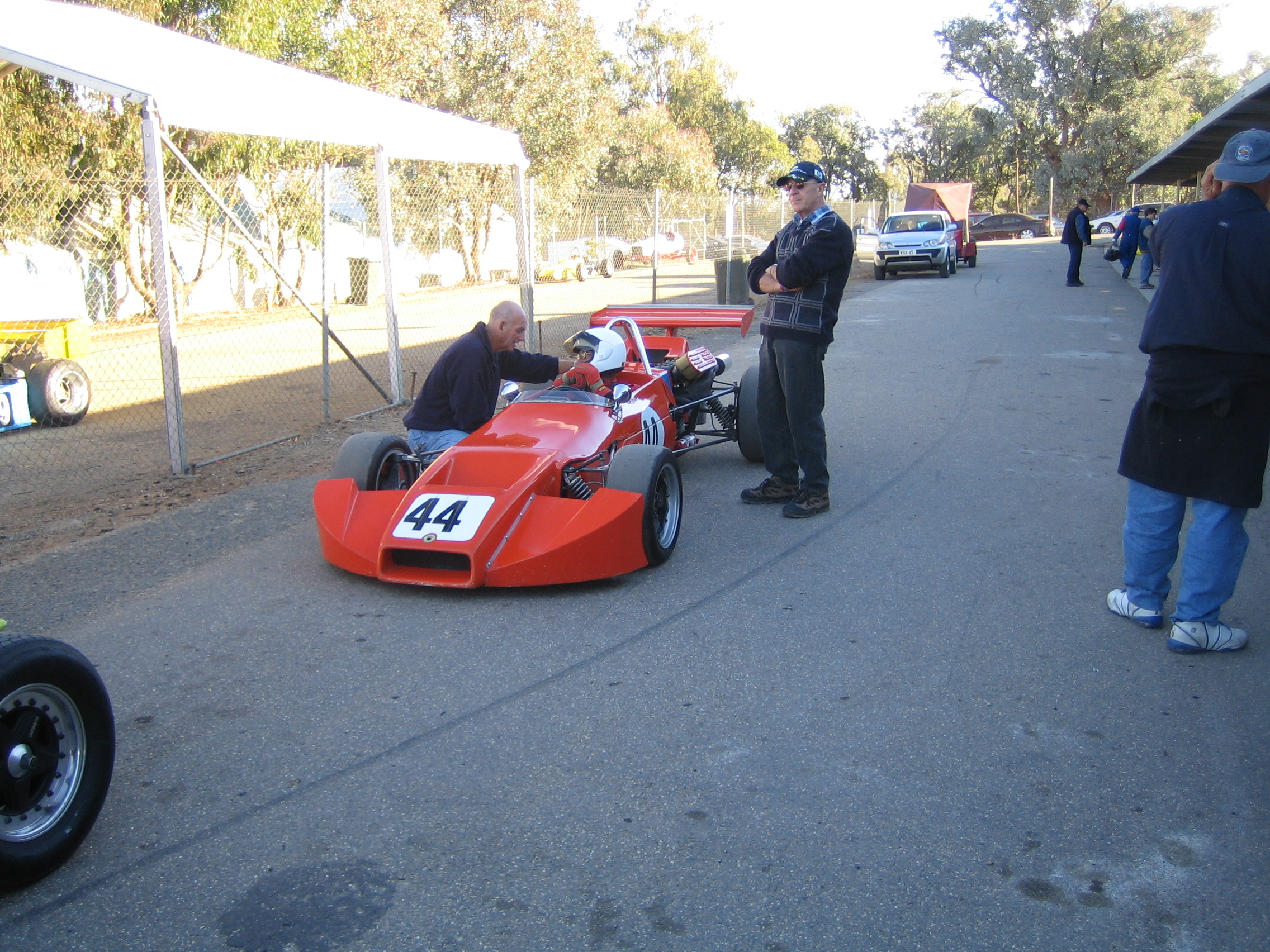
A Cheetah Mk 4

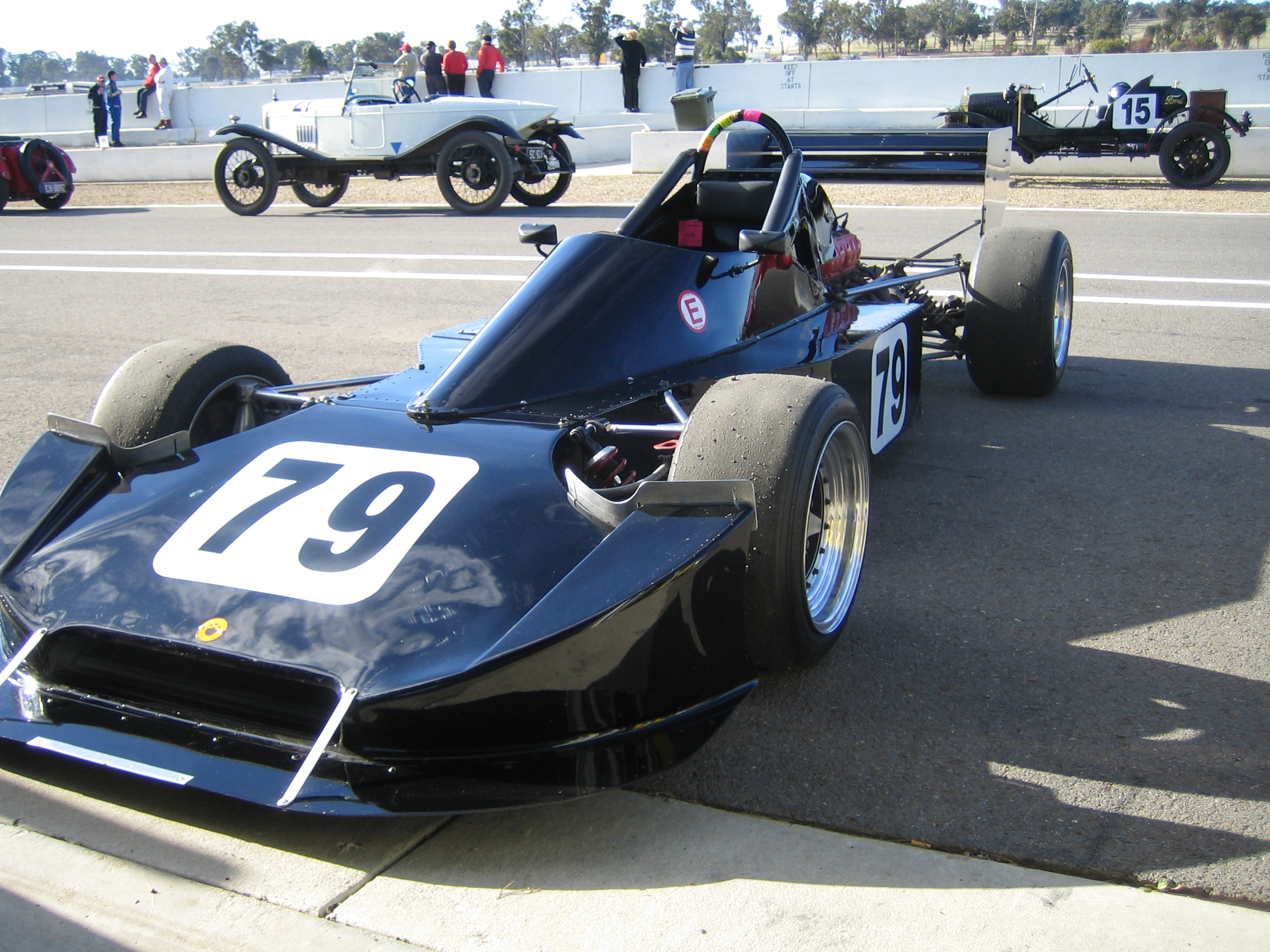
A Cheetah Mk 6

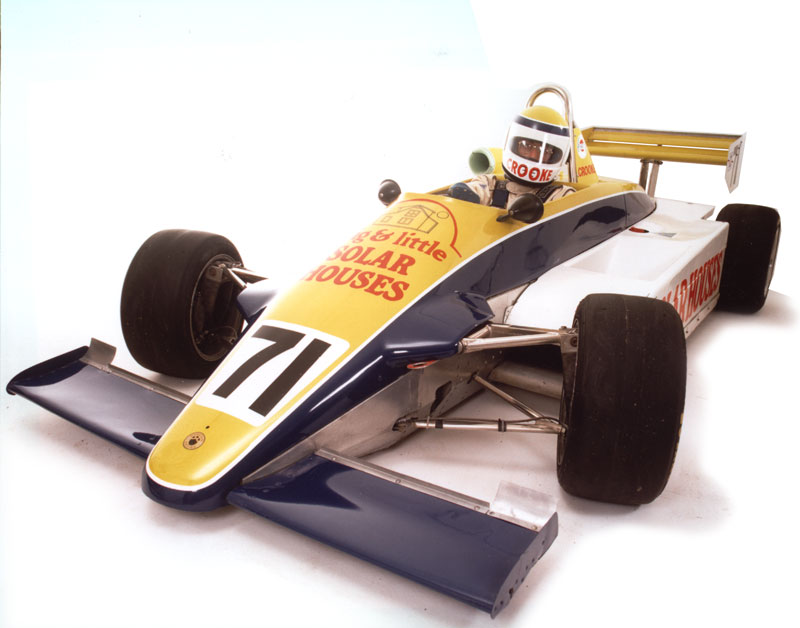
A Cheetah Mk 8

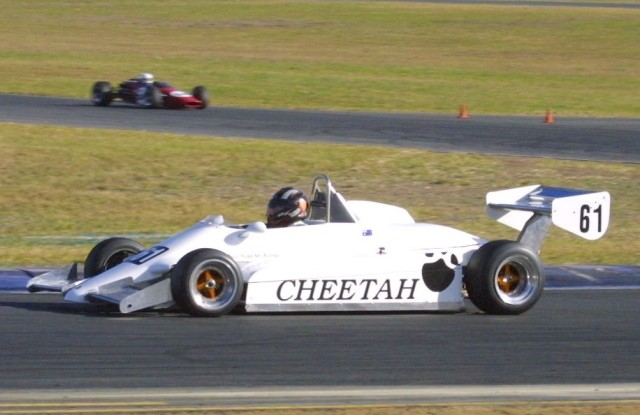
A Cheetah Mk 8

Cheetah Racing Cars was a prolific Australian manufacturer of race cars. The cars were almost solely designed, engineered and constructed by Brian Shead in a small factory at the rear of his home in Mordialloc, a suburb of Melbourne, Australia.

== History ==
The first Cheetah was built for Shead's personal use in 1960. It was a 'Cooper Copy' built to race in Formula Junior. A second Cheetah was built in 1962 and third in 1963. A completely new design was commenced in 1970, after which a friend (Don Biggar) persuaded Shead to construct an additional car, Mk4H Hill-climb car powered by an Oldsmobile V8 engine. By 1973 Shead gave up his usual job to design and build race cars full-time. The final car was produced in 1989, being a Mk9 for use in Formula Holden. Cars were constructed for Formula Junior, Formula Libre, Hillclimbing, Australian Formula 3 (AF3), Australian Formula 2 (AF2), Australian Formula 1 (AF1 or Formula Atlantic or Formula Pacific) and Formula Holden. Cheetah Race Cars dominated Formula Three during the 1970s and in Australian Formula 2 they were the dominant manufacturer during the late 1970s and most of the 1980s. In Formula Holden, the sole Cheetah built for the category in 1989 was still competitive in the mid-1990s against far newer carbon fibre cars built by Ralt and Reynard.

Brian Shead also built one car that was not an open wheeler, being a Cheetah Clubman built for the Sports 1300 racing category. It was raced by Peter Jones, winning 132 races, including seven New South Wales titles and three Victorian titles.

Cheetah race cars are common sights at Australian historic race meetings, hill climbs, sprints and in Australian Formula 2 and Formula-R. In the latter two categories, Cheetah Mk7 and Mk8s which were built in the late 1970s and early 1980s are still winning races and championships against far newer carbon fibre tubbed Dallara and Reynard Motorsport cars.

Although Cheetahs are no longer manufactured, Shead is still actively involved with Cheetah race cars, supplying parts and advice to Cheetah owners.

== Models ==
Name	Category	Comments
Mk 1	Formula Junior	Cooper Copy
Mk 2	Formula Junior	Major revision of Mk 1
Mk 4H	Formula Libre; Hillclimb	
Mk 4A	Australian Formula 3	
Mk 4B	Australian Formula 3	
Mk 4	Australian Formula 3	First production chassis
Mk 4E	Australian Formula 2	
Mk 5	Australian Formula 3	
Clubman	Sports 1300	Clubman Sports 1300
Mk 6	Australian Formula 2 Australian Formula 3	First monocoque chassis.
Mk 6E & Mk6GE	Australian Formula 2	Mk 6 cars with ground effects revision
Mk 7	Australian Formula 2	First ground effects car, inboard front springs
Mk 8	Australian Formula 2 Formula Mondial	Full ground effects, clean sheet design
Mk 9	Formula Holden	Last Cheetah made, clean sheet design

== Championships and Series ==
Season	Driver	Car	Series / Championship
1970s	Brian Shead	Cheetah-Corolla	Multiple Formula 3 State Titles
1970s	Brian Shead	Cheetah-Corolla	Four Formula 3 Stillwell Series
1977	Ian Judd	Cheetah-Oldsmobile	Australian Hillclimb Championship
1979	Brian Shead	Cheetah Mk6-Toyota Celica	Australian Formula 2 Championship
1979	Brian Shead	Cheetah Mk6-Toyota Celica	Formula 2SM (AF2 Series at Amaroo Park Raceway)
1980	Peter Macrow	Cheetah Mk7-Holden Gemini	Victorian Formula 2
1981	Bob Prendergast	Cheetah Mk7-Volkswagen Golf	Victorian Hillclimb Championship
1983	Peter Beehag	Cheetah Mk7-Volkswagen Golf	Victorian Formula 2
1984	Peter Glover	Cheetah Mk7-Volkswagen Golf	Australian Formula 2 Championship
1985	Peter Glover	Cheetah Mk8-Volkswagen Golf	Australian Formula 2 Championship
1985	Jonathan Crooke	Cheetah Mk7-Volkswagen Golf	Victorian Formula 2
1985	Robert Rumble	Cheetah mk6 Renault	NSW Hillclimb Championship
1986	Jonathan Crooke	Cheetah Mk8-Volkswagen Golf	Australian Formula 2 Championship
1986	Derek Pingel	Cheetah Mk8-Volkswagen Golf	Queensland Racing Car Championships
1986	Robert Rumble	Cheetah mk6 Renault	NSW Hillclimb Championship
1987	Arthur Abrahams	Cheetah Mk8-Volkswagen Golf	Australian Formula 2 Championship
1988	Rohan Onslow	Cheetah Mk8-Volkswagen Golf	Australian Drivers' Championship / Australian Formula 2 Championship
1993	Graham Blee	Cheetah Mk6GE	Champion of Winton
1994	Craig Lowndes	Cheetah Mk9-Holden	Australian Silver Star
1995	James (Jim) Gleeson	Cheetah Mk8-Volkswagen Golf	Proflite Australia N.S.W. Formula 2 Driver's Championship
1997	Hugh Gartley	Cheetah Mk4 Toyota Corolla	Champion of Winton, Formula Libre
1998	Bruce Combe	Cheetah Mk7 Toyota Celica	Australian Hillclmb, Under 2 litre
2002	Brendon Cook	Cheetah Mk7-Volkswagen Golf	Australian Formula 2 Rookie of the Year
2004	Kevin Lewis	Ransberg Cheetah Volkswagen Golf	Australian Formula 2
2006	Kevin Lewis	Ransberg Cheetah Volkswagen Golf	Australian Formula 2
2006	Edward Gavin	Cheetah Mk8 Volkswagen Golf	Australian Formula 2 Rookie of the Year
2007	Edward Gavin	Cheetah Mk8 Volkswagen Golf	Australian Formula 2

== Lap records ==
Track	Distance	Class	Driver	Car	Year	Time
Symmons Plains	2.4 km	AF2	Jonathan Crooke	Cheetah Mk8 - Judd Golf VW	9/3/1986	54.73s
Baskerville	2.01 km	AF2	Jonathan Crooke	Cheetah Mk8 - Judd Golf VW	16/3/1986	50.24s
Surfers Paradise	3.2 km	AF2	Jonathan Crooke	Cheetah Mk8 - Judd Golf VW	18/5/1986	1m07.3s
Oran Park	2.62 km	AF2	Jonathan Crooke	Cheetah Mk8 - Judd Golf VW	8/6/1986	1m05.8s
Lakeside	2.4 km	AF2	Jonathan Crooke / Arthur Abrahams	Cheetah Mk8 - Judd Golf VW	15/6/1986	50.6s
Sandown	3.9 km	AF2	Arthur Abrahams	Cheetah Mk8 - Golf VW	14/9/1986	1m40.2s
Amaroo Park	1.946 km	AF2	Arthur Abrahams	Cheetah Mk8 - Golf VW	21/6/1987	46.52s
Winton Motor Raceway - Short Circuit	2.03 km	AF2	Arthur Abrahams	Ransberg Cheetah Mk8 - Golf VW	-/12/1988	56.9600s
Eastern Creek Raceway	3.93 km	AF2	Arthur Abrahams	Ransberg Cheetah - Golf VW	25/08/1991	1m29.3500s
Wakefield Park	2.2 km	AF2	Craig Smith	Cheetah Mk8 - Golf VW	16/09/2001	59.0361s
Adelaide International Raceway	2.41 km	AF2	Peter Glover	Cheetah - Golf VW	??	52.5
