= 1978 TAA Formula Ford Driver to Europe Series =

Seasons
- ← 1977 1979 →

The 1978 TAA Formula Ford Driver to Europe Series was an Australian motor racing competition for Formula Ford racing cars. It was the ninth national series for Formula Fords to be held in Australia.

The series was won by John Wright driving a Bowin P4.

== Schedule ==
The series was contested over eight rounds.

Round	Circuit	Date	Round winner	Car	Entrant
1	Sandown	5 February	Elwyn Bickley	Elwyn 002	
2	Oran Park	26 February	Wally Storey	Elwyn 001	
3	Calder	19 March	Peter Krefel	Royale RP21	Peter Krefel
4	Oran Park	26 March	John Wright	Bowin P4	
5	Amaroo Park	19 April	Russell Steel	Elfin 600	
6	Surfers Paradise	21 May	Elwyn Bickley	Elwyn 002	
7	Amaroo Park	9 July	Russell Norden	Mawer	
8	Calder	15 October	Russell Norden	Mawer	

== Series standings ==
Position	Driver	Car	Entrant	Points
1	John Wright	Bowin P4	John Wright	52
2	Gerry Witenden	Birrana F71	Gerry Witenden	52
3	Richard Davison	Hawke DL17	Richard Davison	45
4	Peter Krefel	Royale RP21	Peter Krefel	33
5	Don Bretland	Van Diemen	Don Bretland	31
6	Alan Goldsmith	Palliser	Paul Liston	25
7	Wally Storey	Elwyn 001	Mawer Engineering	24
8	Elwyn Bickley	Elwyn 002		23
9	Graham Smith	Bowin P4a		21
10	Russell Norden	Mawer		20
