= John Smith (racing driver, born 1952) =

Australian racing driver

- Nationality: Australian
- Born: August 12, 1952 (age 74) Sydney

Australian Touring Car Championship career
- Years active: 1981–93
- Teams: John Smith Racing; Toyota Team Australia; Caltex CXT Racing; Dick Johnson Racing
- Starts: 46

Championship titles
- 1977 1981 1986: Australian Formula Ford; Australian Formula 2 Australian 2-Litre Touring Cars
- Statistics up to date as of 26 March 2026.

John Smith (born 12 August 1952, Sydney) was a racing driver from Australia, active from 1970 to 1994. As of the 2026 Australian Grand Prix, Smith is the last Australian driver to have finished on the podium of the Australian Grand Prix in 1983, prior to it joining the world championship calendar in 1985.

== Racing career ==
The son of a car dealer, Smith originally raced a Mini Cooper before moving to Formula Vee single-seaters in 1974. In 1975 he bought a Rennmax Formula Ford and was the 1977 TAA Formula Ford Driver to Europe Series champion, having been runner-up the previous year.

In 1979, Allan Grice put Smith in contact with privateer Holden Torana driver Ralph Radburn for his debut in the Bathurst 1000, and the duo came an unlikely third. As a result of Smith's efforts, he was placed with Grice the following year.

Smith focussed on single seaters over the next few years, winning the 1981 Australian Formula 2 Championship in a Ralt RT1 and finishing as runner-up in the 1983 Australian Drivers' Championship in a Ralt RT4. He was also runner-up in the 1983 Australian Grand Prix.

From 1985 to 1988, Smith's activities were mostly in the Australian Touring Car Championship, driving for Toyota, although without any significant success; he returned to the series in Toyotas in 1990 and 1993. At the end of 1988, he took part in the Sandown Park Supersprint, the final round of the 1988 World Sportscar Championship, sharing an ADA with Arthur Abrahams, and finished 7th.

== Career results ==
=== Racing record ===
Season	Series	Position	Car	Team
1976	TAA Formula Ford Driver to Europe Series	**2nd**	Bowin P4A Ford	John Smith / Lappington Inn
1977	TAA Formula Ford Driver to Europe Series	**1st**	Bowin P4A Ford	Grace Bros Race Team
1979	New Zealand Formula Pacific	6th	Ralt RT1 Ford BDA	Graham Watson Racing
1979	Australian Drivers' Championship	4th	Ralt RT1 Ford BDA	Mr Juicy Racing
1979	Australian Formula 2 Championship	6th	Ralt - Ford	Mr Juicy Racing
1980	Australian Drivers' Championship	4th	Ralt RT1 Ford BDA	John Smith
1980	Australian Formula 2 Championship	**2nd**	Ralt - Ford	John Smith
1981	Australian Formula 2 Championship	**1st**	Ralt - Ford	John Smith
1981	National Panasonic Series	**3rd**	Ralt RT1 Ford BDA	John Smith
1982	Australian Drivers Championship	4th	Ralt RT4 Ford BDD	John Smith
1983	Australian Drivers Championship	**2nd**	Ralt RT4 Ford BDD	John Smith
1983	Australian Sports Car Championship	18th	Tiga SC80 - Mazda	John Smith
1984	Australian Drivers Championship	8th	Tiga TA81 Ford BDD	Porsche Cars Australia
1984	Australian Endurance Championship	45th	Toyota Sprinter	Toyota Team Australia
1985	Australian Touring Car Championship	7th	Toyota Sprinter; Toyota Corolla	Toyota Team Australia
1985	Australian Endurance Championship	4th	Toyota Corolla	Toyota Team Australia
1986	Australian 2-Litre Touring Car Championship	**1st**	Toyota Corolla	Toyota Team Australia
1987	Australian 2-Litre Touring Car Championship	4th	Toyota Corolla	Toyota Team Australia
1987	Australian Touring Car Championship	18th	Toyota Corolla	Toyota Team Australia
1988	World Sports Prototype Championship	66th	ADA 03 - Ford Cosworth DFL	ADA Engineering
1988	World Sports Prototype Championship (Group C2)	40th	ADA 03 - Ford Cosworth DFL	ADA Engineering
1989	Australian Drivers Championship	11th	Ralt RT21 -Holden	David Mawer
1990	Australian Endurance Championship	20th	Toyota Supra; Toyota Corolla	Toyota Team Australia
1993	Australian Touring Car Championship	11th	Toyota Corolla; Toyota Corolla Seca	Caltex CXT Racing
1993	Australian 2-Litre Touring Car Championship	**2nd**	Toyota Corolla; Toyota Corolla Seca	Caltex CXT Racing
1995	Australian GT Production Car Series	20th	Porsche 993 RSCS	Morgan & Banks
1997	Australian GT Production Car Series	12th	Porsche 993 RSCS	Morgan & Banks
2007	New South Wales Formula Ford Championship	15th	Lola T440	John Smith
2008	New South Wales Formula Ford Championship	12th	Lola T440	John Smith
2011	New South Wales Formula Ford Championship	**3rd**	Listec WIL013	Listec Cars Australia

==== Complete New Zealand Grand Prix results ====
Year	Team	Car	Qualifying	Main race
1979	(New Zealand) Greame Watson	Ralt RT1 Ford BDA	4th	4th
1980	(Australia) John Smith	Ralt RT1 Ford BDA	4th	8th
1981	(Australia) John Smith	March 77B Ford BDA	4th	4th

==== Complete Australian Grand Prix results ====
Year	Team	Car	Qualifying	Main race
1979	(Australia) John Smith	Ralt RT1 Ford BDA	10th	4th
1980	(Australia) John Smith	Ralt RT1 Ford BDA	12th	DNF
1981	(Australia) John Smith	Ralt RT4 Ford	8th	12th
1982	(Australia) John Smith	Ralt RT4 Ford BDD	8th	9th
1983	(Australia) John Smith	Ralt RT4 Ford BDD	3rd	**2nd**

=== Complete Australian Touring Car Championship results ===
(key) (Races in bold indicate pole position) (Races in italics indicate fastest lap)

Year	Team	Car	1	2	3	4	5	6	7	8	9	10	11	12	13	14	15	16	17	18	DC	Points
1981	John Smith	Ford XD Falcon	SYM	CAL	CAL	ORA	SAN	SAN	WAN	AIR	AIR	SUR	LAK; Ret								NC	0
1985	Toyota Team Australia	Toyota Corolla GT	WIN; 7	SAN; 9	SYM; 10	WAN; 11	AIR; 12	CAL; 11	SUR; 10	LAK; 8	AMA; 10	ORA; 15									7th	110
1986	Toyota Team Australia	Toyota Corolla GT	AMA	SYM; 9	SAN	AIR; 15	WAN	SUR	CAL; 15	LAK	WIN	ORA; 14									15th	35
1987	Toyota Team Australia	Toyota Corolla GT	CAL; Ret	SYM	LAK	WAN	AIR	SUR	SAN; 12	AMA	ORA										18th	6
1988	Toyota Team Australia	Toyota Corolla FX GT	CAL; 16	SYM; 13	WIN; 12	WAN; 11	AIR; 22	LAK; Ret	SAN; 15	AMA	ORA										NC	0
1989	Toyota Team Australia	Toyota Corolla FX GT	AMA	SYM	LAK	WAN	MAL	SAN	WIN	ORA; 22											NC	0
1990	Toyota Team Australia	Toyota Supra Turbo	AMA; Ret	SYM; 17	PHI; 12	WIN; Ret	LAK; 12	MAL	BAR	ORA											NC	0
1993	Caltex CXT Racing	Toyota Corolla FX-GT AE90	AMA; R1; 2	AMA; R2; 16	SYM; R3; 18	SYM; R4; 4	PHI; R5; 17	PHI; R6; 21	LAK; R7; 20	LAK; R8; 16	WIN; R9; 18	WIN; R10; Ret									11th	48
1993	Caltex CXT Racing	Toyota Corolla Seca AE93											EAS; R11; Ret	EAS; R12; 19	MAL; R13; 16	MAL; R14; 18	BAR; R15; 13	BAR; R16; 14	ORA; R17; 9	ORA; R18; DNS	11th	48

=== Complete Bathurst 1000 results ===
Year	Team	Car	Co-driver	Overall position	Class position	Laps
1979	Ralph Radburn	Holden LX Torana SS A9X Hatchback	(Australia) Ralph Radburn	**3rd**		155
1980	Craven Mild Racing	Holden VC Commodore	(Australia) Allan Grice	7th	7th	156
1981	Peter Williamson Toyota	Toyota Celica	(Australia) Peter Williamson	12th	**1st**	111
1985	Toyota Team Australia	Toyota Corolla GT	(Australia) Drew Price	17th	**1st**	147
1986	Toyota Team Australia	Toyota Corolla GT	(Australia) Drew Price	DNF		49
1987	Toyota Team Australia	Toyota Corolla GT	(Australia) Drew Price (Australia) John Faulkner	DNF		43
1988	Shell Ultra Hi Racing	Ford Sierra RS500	(Australia) Dick Johnson (Australia) John Bowe (Australia) Alfredo Costanzo	**2nd**		160
1989	Toyota Team Australia	Toyota Supra Turbo A	(Australia) Drew Price	DNF		35
1990	Toyota Team Australia	Toyota Supra Turbo A	(Australia) Peter McKay (Australia) Mark Poole	DNF		30
1993	Caltex CXT Racing Team	Toyota Corolla Seca	(Australia) Peter McKay (Australia) Mark Poole	DNF		33
1997	Playscape Racing	Ford Falcon EF	(Australia) Kevin Waldock	DNF		29

=== Complete World Touring Car Championship results ===
(key) (Races in bold indicate pole position) (Races in italics indicate fastest lap)

Year	Team	Car	1	2	3	4	5	6	7	8	9	10	11	DC	Points
1987	Toyota Team Australia	Toyota Corolla GT	MNZ	JAR	DIJ	NUR	SPA	BNO	SIL	BAT; Ret	CLD	WEL	FJI	NC	0

=== Complete World Sports Prototype Championship results ===
(key) (Races in bold indicate pole position) (Races in italics indicate fastest lap)

Year	Team	Car	1	2	3	4	5	6	7	8	9	10	11	DC	Points
1988	ADA Engineering	ADA 03 - Ford Cosworth	JRZ	JAR	MON	SIL	LMS	BRN	BHT	NUR	SPA	FJI	SAN; 7	68th	6

=== Complete Bathurst 12 Hour results ===
Year	Team	Co-drivers	Car	Class	Laps	Pos.	Class pos.
1991	(Australia) Caltex CXT Racing Team	(Australia) Colin Bond (Australia) Bruce Stewart	Toyota MR2	S	233	6th	**1st**
1992	(Australia) John Bourke	(Australia) John Bourke (Australia) Steve Griffiths	Toyota Supra	T	189	DNF	
1993	(Australia) Quell Fire & Safety Equipment	(Australia) Geoff Morgan (Australia) Kevin Waldock	Porsche 968 CS	C	263	DSQ	
1994	(Australia) Mercantile Mutual Dealer Team	(Australia) Jason Bargwanna (Australia) Scott Bargwanna	Toyota MR2	S	248	5th	**2nd**

=== Complete Eastern Creek 12 Hour results ===
Year	Team	Co-drivers	Car	Class	Laps	Pos.	Class pos.
1995	(Australia) Geoff Morgan	(Australia) Geoff Morgan (Australia) Brad Jones	Porsche 911 RSCS	X	111	DNF	

Sporting positions
Preceded by Richard Carter	TAA Formula Ford Driver to Europe Series; Champion; 1977	Succeeded by John Wright
Preceded by Richard Davison	Australian Formula 2 Championship; Champion; 1981	Succeeded by Lucio Cesario
Preceded by Inaugural	Australian 2-Litre Touring Car Championship; Champion; 1986	Succeeded by Mark Skaife
