= 1980 TAA Formula Ford Driver To Europe Series =

The 1980 TAA Formula Ford Driver to Europe Series was an Australian motor racing competition for Formula Ford racing cars. The series, which was the eleventh Australian Formula Ford Series, was won by Stephen Brook driving a Lola T440.

== Series schedule ==
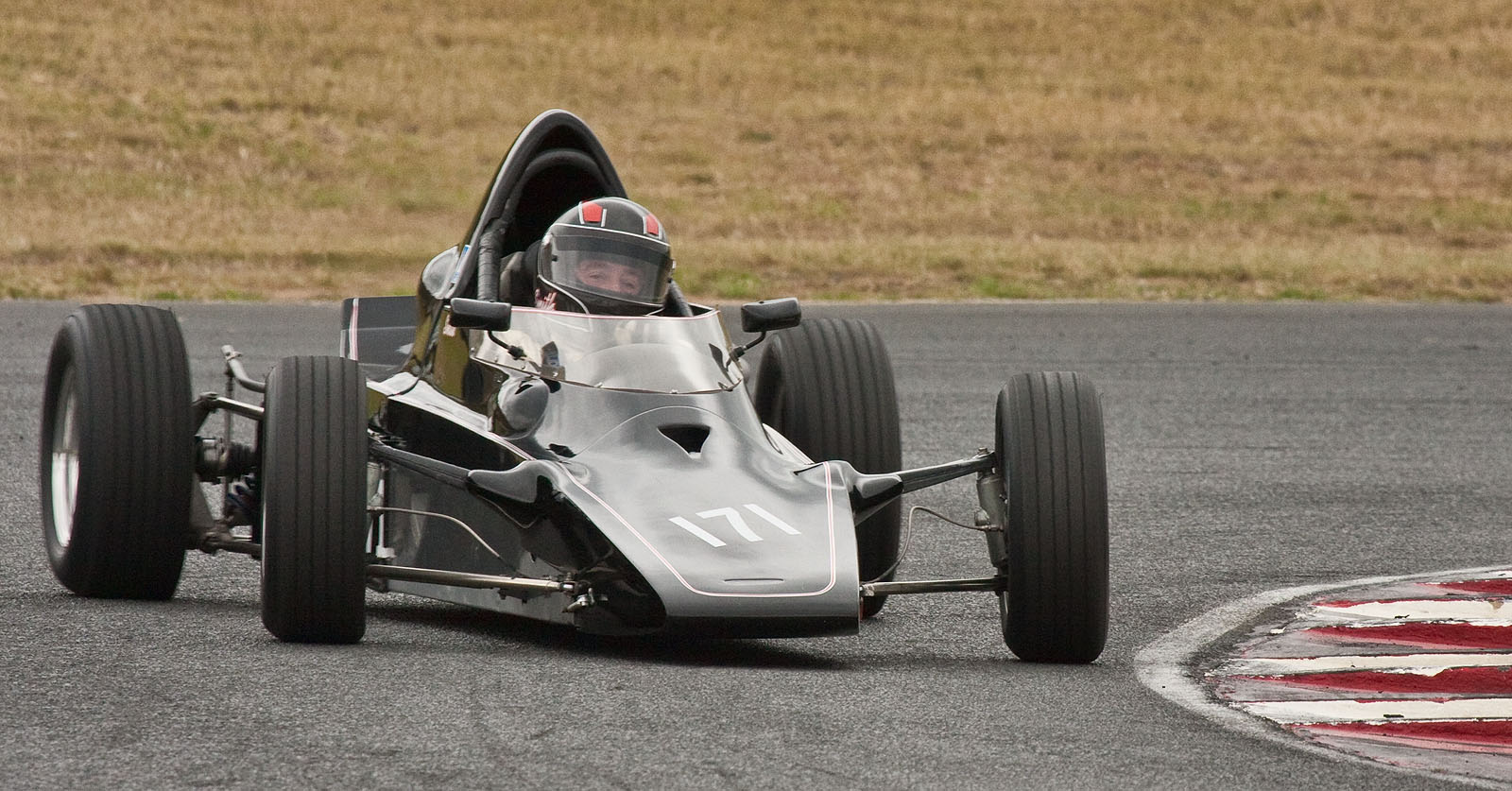
Stephen Brook won the series driving a Lola T440, similar to the example pictured above

The series was contested over eight rounds with one race per round.

Round	Circuit	Date	Winning driver	Car
1	Sandown	24 February	Stephen Brook	Lola T440
2	Calder	16 March	Stephen Brook	Lola T440
3	Amaroo Park	6 April	Wal Storey	Elwyn 002
4	Adelaide	1 June	Stephen Brook	Lola T440
5	Oran Park		Stephen Brook	Lola T440
6	Lakeside		Stephen Brook	Lola T440
7	Amaroo Park	10 August	Stephen Brook	Lola T440
8	Sandown	14 September	Warren Smith	Bowin P4A

== Points system ==
Points were awarded on a 20, 15, 12, 10, 8, 6, 4, 3, 2, 1 basis for the first ten places at each round.

== Series standings ==
Position	Driver	Car	Entrant	San	Cal	Ama	Ade	Ora	Lak	Ama	San	Total
1	Stephen Brook	Lola T440	Bob Holden	20	20	12	20	20	20	20	-	132
2	Warren Smith	Bowin P4A	W. Smith	-	10	8	15	12	3	12	20	80
3	David Earle	Elfin Aero	Thomson Motor Auctions	10	6	10	8	-	12	10	10	66
4	Ron Barnacle	Van Diemen	Dissaico Garge Equipment	6	8	6	3	10	10	8	4	55
5	Robyn Hamilton	Elfin 620B	Charlie	1	15	15	12	-	-	-	-	43
6	Graeme Wilson	Elfin 600	G. Wilson	15	12	-	10	-	-	-	-	37
7	Jeff Summers	Elfin 620B	J. Summers	-	8	-	-	4	8	-	-	20
=	Wally Storey	Elwyn 002		-	-	20	-	-	-	-	-	20
9	Garry Tully	Elfin 620B	G. Tully	-	-	1	-	-	15	3	-	19
10	Jeff Besnard	Mawer 004	Classic Trailers P/L	-	-	-	-	15	-	-	-	15
=	Jeff Walters	Bowin P4A	J. Walters	-	-	-	-	-	-	15	-	15
=	Ian Grainger	Bowin P4A	S. Brook	-	-	-	-	-	-	-	15	15
13	Terry Spears	Bowin P4A		12	-	2	-	-	-	-	-	14
14	Alan Bisset	Bowin	A. Bisset	-	-	-	-	3	-	4	6	13
15	Robert Simpson	Elfin	R. Simpson	-	-	-	6	-	-	6	-	12
=	Kim Jones	Elfin 620B		-	-	-	-	-	-	-	12	12
17	Geoff Howat	Bowin P4A	G. Howat	3	3	4	-	-	-	-	-	10
=	Rex Broadbent	Wren	R. Broadbent	-	-	-	2	-	-	-	8	10
19	Gos Cory	Elfin	G. Cory	-	-	-	-	6	-	2	1	9
20	Graham Smith	Bowin P4A		-	-	-	-	-	8	-	-	8
21	Alan Whitchurch	Bowin	D. Wilkins	-	-	-	-	-	6	-	-	6
22	Tony Boot	Elfin	T. Boot	4	1	-	-	-	-	-	-	5
23	Gary Batten	Bowin	G. Batten	-	4	-	-	-	-	-	-	4
=	Michael Truman	Royale	Michael Truman	-	-	3	1	-	-	-	-	4
=	Don Greig			-	-	-	-	4	-	-	-	4
=	Peter Ainscough	Elfin		-	-	-	-	-	4	-	-	4

Note: All cars were powered by mandatory 1600cc Ford four cylinder engines.
