= 1981 TAA Formula Ford Driver to Europe Series =

The 1981 TAA Formula Ford Driver to Europe Series was an Australian motor racing competition for Formula Ford racing cars.

The series, which was the twelfth Australian Formula Ford Series, was won by Phillip Revell driving a Lola T440.

== Series schedule ==
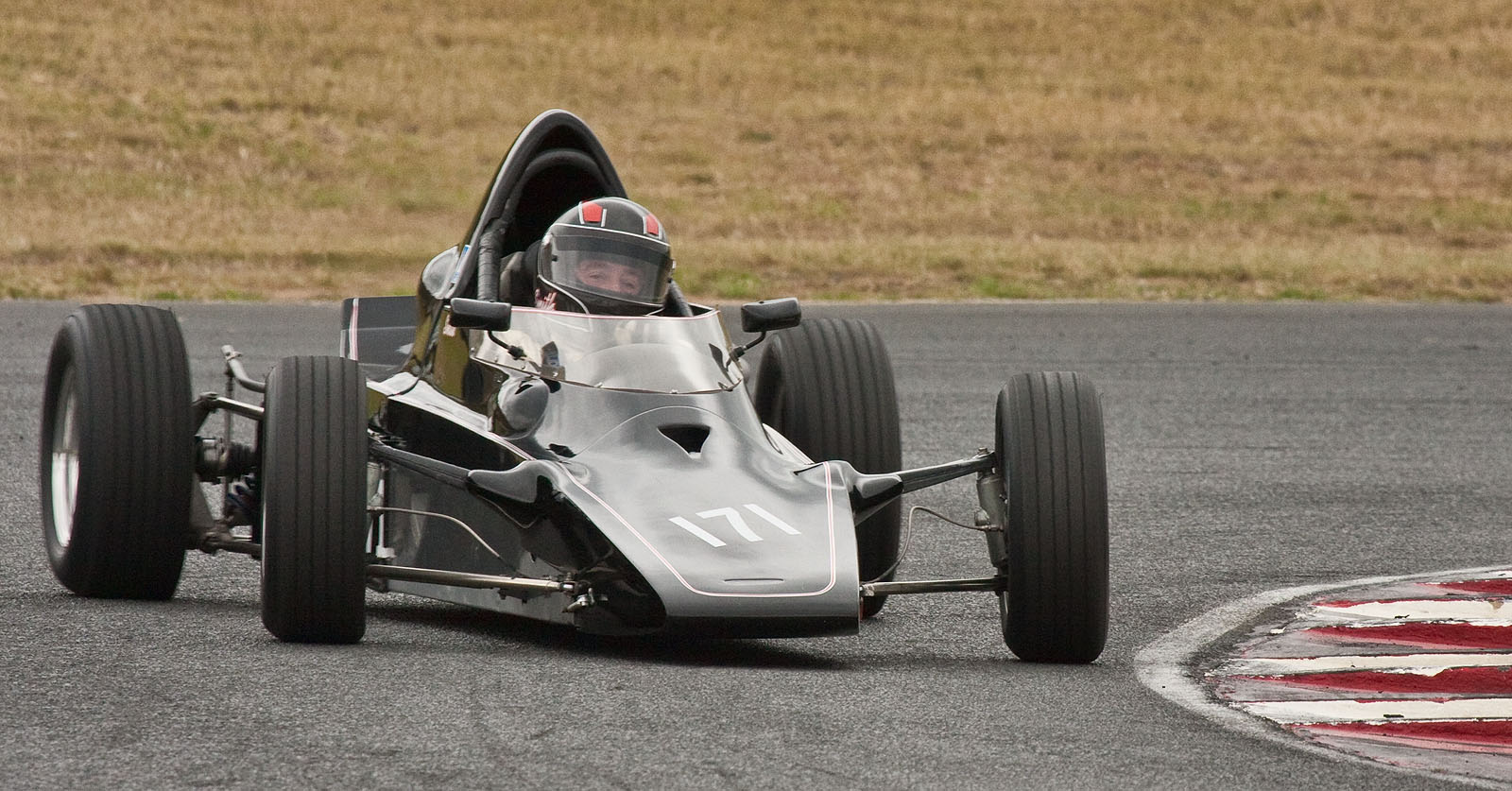
Phillip Revell won the series driving a Lola T440, similar to the example pictured above

The series was contested over eight rounds with one race per round.

Round	Circuit	Date	Winning driver	Car
1	Sandown	?? February	Phillip Revell	Lola T440
2	Calder	?? March	Phillip Revell	Lola T440
3	Amaroo Park	??	Don Bretland	Van Diemen RF75
4	Adelaide International Raceway	3 May	Jeff Summers	Elfin 620B
5	Oran Park	21 June	Phillip Revell	Lola T440
6	Amaroo Park	9 August	Phillip Revell	Lola T440
7	Surfers Paradise	20 August	Don Bretland	Van Diemen RF75
8	Sandown	13 September	Phillip Revell	Lola T440

== Points system ==
Points were awarded on a 20, 15, 12, 10, 8, 6, 4, 3, 2, 1 basis for the first ten places at each round.

== Series standings ==
Position	Driver	Car	Entrant	San	Cal	Ama	Ade	Ora	Ama	Sur	San	Total
1	Phillip Revell	Lola T440	Bob Holden Motors	20	20	10	-	20	20	15	20	125
2	Don Bretland	Van Diemen RF75	Don Bretland	15	6	20	12	10	12	20	15	110
3	Ron Barnacle	Van Diemen RF77	Nissalco Garage Equipment	10	15	3	6	-	15	12	4	65
4	Jeff Summers	Elfin 620B	Jeff Summers	8	2	-	20	8	4	8	12	62
5	Garry Tully	Elfin 620	Garry Tully	1	12	-	-	12	8	-	8	41
6	Bradley Jones	Elwyn 002	Bradley Jones	3	-	15	2	15	-	-	-	35
=7	Jeff Besnard	Mawer 004	Jeff Besnard	4	10	4	15	-	-	-	-	33
=7	Laurie Bennett	Wren	Laurie Bennett	-	4	6	-	1	10	2	10	33
9	David Earle	Elfin Aero	David Earle	12	-	-	-	4	6	4	6	32
10	Rex Broadbent	Wren	R.G. Broadbent	2	-	8	10	6	-	-	-	26
11	Ray Colenso	Elfin 600	Morris 850 Club Geelong	-	-	-	8	-	3	-	3	14
12	Kim Jones	Elfin 620B	Kim Jones	-	-	12	-	-	-	-	-	12
=13	Tony Boot	Elfin 600	Tony Boot	-	8	-	-	-	-	-	2	10
=13	Alan Swindells	Bowin		-	-	-	-	-	-	10	-	10
15	Robert Simpson	Elfin	Robert Simpson	6	-	-	-	-	2	-	1	9
16	David Stanley	Image Mk III	David Stanley	-	-	-	-	-	-	6	-	6
17	Steve Farrell	Elfin 600		-	3	2	-	-	-	-	-	5
18	Robert Benson	Elwyn		-	-	-	4	-	-	-	-	4
=19	Don Greig	Bowin P6	Don Greig	-	-	-	-	3	-	-	-	3
=19	Jack Lunenberg	Wren	Jack Lunenberg	-	-	-	3	-	-	-	-	3
=19	Warwick Rooklyn	Bowin P6		-	-	-	-	2	1	-	-	3
=19	Geoff Howat	Bowin		-	-	-	-	-	-	3	-	3
=23	Edward Vieusseux	Bowin		-	-	1	-	-	-	-	-	1
=23	Gary Batten	Bowin P4A	Gary Batten	-	1	-	-	-	-	-	-	1
=23	Alan Whitechurch	Bowin		-	-	-	-	-	-	1	-	1
