= 1972 TAA Formula Ford Driver to Europe Series =

The 1972 TAA Formula Ford Driver to Europe Series was an Australian motor racing competition open to Formula Ford racing cars. It was the third annual Australian national series for Formula Fords.

The series was won by Bob Skelton driving a Bowin P4a.

== Schedule ==
The series was contested over eight rounds.

| Round | Circuit | State | Date | Winning driver | Car |
| 1 | Warwick Farm | New South Wales | 13 February | Bob Beasley | Bowin P4a |
| 2 | Sandown | Victoria | 20 February | Bob Skelton | Bowin P4a |
| 3 | Calder | Victoria | 19 March | Bob Beasley | Bowin P4a |
| 4 | Sandown | Victoria | 16 April | Bob Skelton | Bowin P4a |
| 5 | Hume Weir | Victoria | 11 June | Bob Skelton | Bowin P4a |
| 6 | Oran Park | New South Wales | 25 June | Bob Skelton | Bowin P4a |
| 7 | Warwick Farm | New South Wales | 9 July | John Leffler | Bowin P4a |
| 8 | Amaroo Park | New South Wales | 23 July | John Leffler | Bowin P4a |

== Points system ==
Series points were awarded on a 10-9-8-76-5-4-3-2-1 basis for the first ten positions in each round.

Only the best three scores in Victorian races and the best three scores in New South Wales races were considered for each driver.

== Series standings ==
| Pos. | Driver | Car | Entrant | Points |
| 1 | Bob Skelton | Bowin P4a | Finnie Ford P/L | 57 |
| 2 | John Leffler | Bowin P4a | John Leffler Racing; Grace Bros. Race Team | 55 |
| 3 | Bob Beasley | Bowin P4a | Jack Brabham Ford | 53 |
| 4 | Enno Busselmann | Elfin 600 | Enno Busselmann | 47 |
| 5 | David Mingay | Birrana F71 | David Mingay | 38 |
| 6 | Mike Hall | Elfin 600 | Michael Hall | 30 |
| 7 | Peter Larner | Wren | Bill Reynolds | 21 |
| 8 | Len Searle | Bowin P4a | Len Searle; Gary Cooke Motors | 19 |
| 9 | Gerry Murphy | Elfin 600 | Gerry Murphy | 17 |
| 10 | David Green | Wren | Morley Ford | 14 |
| 11 | Murray Coombs | Wren | John Lucas Ford | 13 |
| = | Bob Kennedy | Elfin 600 | Bob Kennedy | 13 |
| 13 | Doug Heasman | Bowin P4a | Doug Heasman | 9 |
| 14 | Peter Edwards | Elfin 600 | Peter Edwards | 8 |
| 15 | Richard Carter | Hustler SC2; Talisman | Richard Carter | 6 |
| 16 | John Edmonds | Aztec AR8 | John Edmonds | 4 |
| 17 | Mike Twigden | Elfin Catalina | Michael Twigden | 1 |
