= 1973 TAA Formula Ford Driver to Europe Series =

The 1973 TAA Formula Ford Driver to Europe Series was an Australian motor racing competition open to Formula Ford racing cars. It was the fourth annual Australian national series for Formula Fords.

The series, which was sponsored by TAA, was won by John Leffler, driving a Bowin P4a and a Bowin P6F.

== Schedule ==
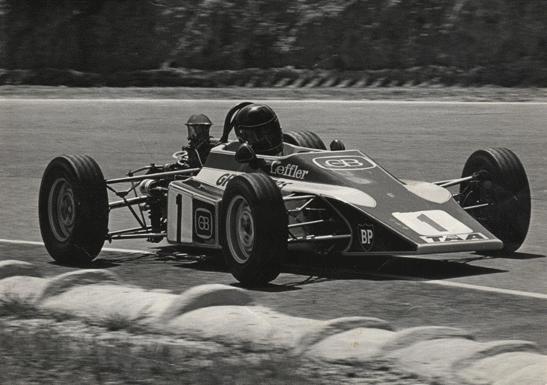
John Leffler won the series driving a Bowin P4a and a Bowin P6F (pictured)

The series was contested over nine rounds.

Round	Circuit	State	Date	Round winner	Car
1	Phillip Island	Victoria	28 January	John Leffler	Bowin P4a
2	Warwick Farm	New South Wales	11 February	David Mingay	Bowin P6F
3	Sandown	Victoria	18 February	John Leffler	Bowin P4a
4	Amaroo Park	New South Wales	4 March	John Leffler	Bowin P6F
5	Calder Raceway	Victoria		Peter Larner	Wren
6	Oran Park	New South Wales	20 May	Enno Buesselmann	Elfin 600
7	Hume Weir	Victoria	10 June	Paul Bernasconi	Bowin P4a
8	Lakeside	Queensland		John Leffler	Bowin P6F
9	Warwick Farm	New South Wales	15 July	John Leffler	Bowin P6F

== Points system ==
Points were awarded on a 10-9-8-7-6-5-4-3-2-1 basis at each round.

The worst results from one round in New South Wales and from one round in Victoria were dropped from each drivers final points score.

== Series standings ==
Position	Driver	Car	Entrant	Points
1	John Leffler	Bowin P4a & Bowin P6F	Grace Bros Race Team	68
2	David Mingay	Bowin P6F	David Mingay	61
3	Gerry Murphy	Elfin 600	Gerard Murphy	48
4	Paul Bernasconi	Bowin P4a	Paul Bernasconi	43
5	Peter Larner	Wren	Bill Reynolds	34
=	Terry Perkins	Elfin 600 & Elfin 620	Strapp Ford	34
7	Geoffrey Brabham	Elfin 620	Jack Brabham Ford	17
8	Dale Thompson	Bowin P4a	Dale Thompson	15
9	Chester Kernot	Elfin 600B	Chester Kernot	13
=	Stephen Brook	Bowin P4a	S Brook	13

Note: All cars were powered by 1.6 litre Ford engines.

Note: Only the top ten points-scorers are shown in the above table.
