= 1974 TAA Formula Ford Driver to Europe Series =

The 1974 TAA Formula Ford Driver to Europe Series was an Australian motor racing competition open to Formula Ford racing cars. It was the fifth annual Australian national series for Formula Fords.

The series was won by Terry Perkins, driving an Elfin 620FF and a Titan.

== Schedule ==
The series was contested over ten rounds with one race per round.

Round	Circuit	Date	Round winner	Car
1	Sandown	17 February	Geoff Brabham	Bowin P6F
2	Amaroo	3 March	Andrew Miedecke	Birrana
3	Calder	17 March	Andrew Miedecke	Birrana F73
4	Adelaide	31 March	Terry Perkins	Elfin 620FF
5	Surfers Paradise	19 May	Paul Bernasconi	Mawer
6	Oran Park	23 June	Terry Perkins	Elfin 620
7	Sandown	7 July	Peter Lissiuk	Titan Mk6C
8	Amaroo	21 July	Paul Bernasconi	Mawer
9	Oran Park	15 September	Terry Perkins	Titan
10	Calder	20 October	Andrew Miedecke	Birrana F73

== Series standings ==
Position	Driver	Car	Entrant	San	Ama	Cal	Ade	Sur	Ora	San	Ama	Ora	Cal	Total
1	Terry Perkins	Elfin 620FF & Titan	Strapp Ford	8	8	9	10	9	10	7	8	10	-	71
2	Andrew Miedecke	Birrana F73	A.W. Miedecke	7	10	10	-	8	-	9	9	8	10	64
3	Geoff Brabham	Bowin P6F	Grace Bros. Racing Team	10	9	-	9	5	9	8	7	6	2	59
4	Paul Bernasconi	Mawer 004	Mawer Engineering	-	-	-	7	10	-	-	10	9	8	44
5	Peter Lissiuk	Titan Mk6C	Peter Lissiuk	-	-	6	8	6	5	10	4	-	-	39
6	Peter Finlay	Palliser WDF2	P. Finlay	-	-	-	-	-	8	-	-	7	9	24
7	Bernie Haehnle	Bowin P6F	B.K. Haehnle	6	-	-	4	4	7	-	2	-	-	23
8	Peter Larner	Elfin 600	Peter Larner	9	-	7	-	-	-	5	-	-	-	21
=	Steve Wiessner	Elfin 600	Steve Wiessner	5	-	5	-	-	6	-	5	-	-	21
10	Peter Perkins	Elfin 620	Peter Perkins	-	-	8	6	-	-	-	-	-	6	20
11	Alan Whitchurch	Bowin P4	Coachcraft Ford	-	3	-	-	7	2	-	6	-	-	18
12	Gerry Murphy	Elfin 600	Murphy Johnston Imported Cars	-	7	-	-	2	-	-	1	5	-	15
13	John Edmonds	Wren	John Edmonds	4	-	-	5	-	-	2	-	-	3	14
=	John Davis	Bowin P4X	J.D. Racing	-	-	2	-	-	4	3	-	4	1	14
15	Dennis Irving	Elfin 600	Dennis Irving	-	4	3	-	-	-	-	-	-	4	11
16	Laurie Bennett	Elfin 600	Laurie Bennett	1	-	1	-	-	1	6	-	-	-	9
17	Graeme Peart	Elfin 600	Graeme Peart	-	-	-	-	-	-	-	-	-	7	7
18	Paul Fenech	Bowin P4	Stephen Brook	-	6	-	-	-	-	-	-	-	-	6
=	Bob Curro	Bowin P6F	R.J. Curro	-	-	-	-	3	-	-	-	3	-	6
=	John Tuxford	Bowin P4	J. Tuxford	-	-	-	-	1	3	-	-	2	-	6
21	Dale Thompson	Bowin P4A	D. Thompson	-	5	-	-	-	-	-	-	-	-	5
=	Len Croughan	Elfin 620	Len Croughan	2	-	-	3	-	-	-	-	-	-	5
=	Greg Carroll	Elfin 620	Greg Carroll	-	-	-	-	-	-	-	-	-	5	5
24	Brian Wilson	Bowin P4A	Brian Wilson	-	-	4	-	-	-	-	-	-	-	4
=	Peter Presser			-	-	-	-	-	-	4	-	-	-	4
26	Steve Dewhurst	Birrana		3	-	-	-	-	-	-	-	-	-	3
27	Stephen Brook	Bowin P6F	S. Brook	-	-	-	-	-	-	-	3	-	-	3
28	Peter Edwards	Elfin 600	The Guardsman Motor Inn	-	2	-	-	-	-	-	-	-	-	2
=	Werner Bekker	Elfin 620	Quickslot Miniature Raceway	-	-	-	2	-	-	-	-	-	-	2
30	Peter Lander	Bowin P4	Paul Bernasconi	-	1	-	-	-	-	-	-	-	-	1
=	Bryan Cook	Elfin 620FF	Bryan Cook	-	-	-	1	-	-	-	-	-	-	1
=	Kevin Loy	Bowin P6F	K. Loy	-	-	-	-	-	-	1	-	-	-	1
=	Peter Granger	Bowin P6F	Peter Granger	-	-	-	-	-	-	-	-	1	-	1
