= 1971 National Formula Ford Driver to Europe Series =

The 1971 National Formula Ford Driver to Europe Series was an Australian motor racing competition open to Formula Ford racing cars. It was the second annual Australian series for Formula Fords.

The series was won by Larry Perkins driving an Elfin 600.

== Schedule ==
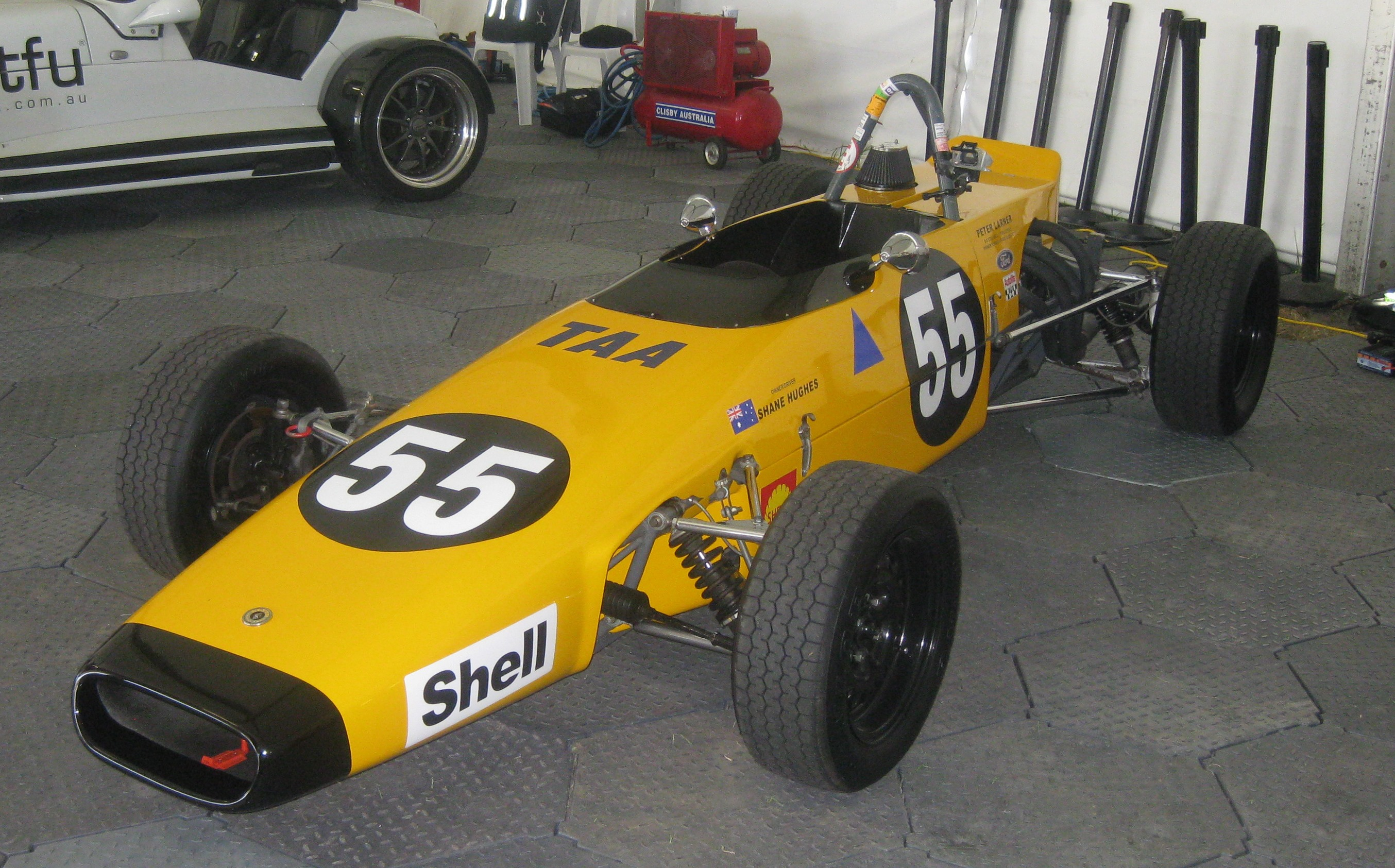
Larry Perkins won the series driving an Elfin 600 similar to that pictured above

The series was contested over twelve rounds.

Round	Circuit	State	Date	Round winner	Car
1	Calder	Victoria	21 March	Larry Perkins	Elfin 600
2	Sandown	Victoria	4 April	Larry Perkins	Elfin 600
3	Winton	Victoria	9 May	Phil Webber	Elfin 600
4	Phillip Island	Victoria	16 May	Gary Rush	Elfin 600
5	Hume Weir	Victoria	13 June	Bob Skelton	Bowin P4a
6	Oran Park	New South Wales	27 June	Larry Perkins	Elfin 600
7	Amaroo Park	New South Wales	25 July	Bob Beasley	Bowin P4a
8	Amaroo Park	New South Wales	22 August	Larry Perkins	Elfin 600
9	Warwick Farm	New South Wales	5 September	Larry Perkins	Elfin 600
10	Oran Park	New South Wales	19 September	Larry Perkins	Elfin 600
11	Hume Weir	Victoria	26 September	Bob Skelton	Bowin P4a
12	Phillip Island	Victoria	24 October	Michael Stillwell	Elfin 600

== Points system ==
Points were awarded on a 10-9-8-7-6-5-4-3-2-1 basis for the first ten places at each round except the Sandown round, for which double points were awarded.

== Series results ==
Position	Driver	Car	Entrant	Points
1	Larry Perkins	Elfin 600	BS Stillwell & Co Pty Ltd	106
2	Bob Skelton	Bowin P4a	Byrt Ford	
3	Garry Rush	Elfin 600	Garry Rush	
4	Michael Stillwell	Elfin 600	BS Stillwell & Co Pty Ltd	
5	Bob Beasley	Bowin P4a	Jack Brabham Ford	
6	Len Searle	Bowin P4a		

All cars were powered by a standard Ford Cortina 1600 GT engine.
