= 1975 TAA Formula Ford Driver to Europe Series =

The 1975 TAA Formula Ford Driver to Europe Series was an Australian motor racing competition open to Formula Ford racing cars. It was the sixth annual Australian national series for Formula Fords.

The series was won by Paul Bernasconi driving a Mawer 004.

== Schedule ==
The series was contested over nine rounds with one race per round.

Round	Circuit	State	Date	Round winner	Car
1	Calder	Victoria	16 March	Peter Finlay	Palliser WD4
2	Amaroo Park	New South Wales		Paul Bernasconi	Mawer 004
3	Oran Park	New South Wales		Paul Bernasconi	Mawer 004
4	Surfers Paradise	Queensland		Paul Bernasconi	Mawer 004
5	Sandown Park	Victoria	6 July	Peter Finlay	Palliser WD4
6	Amaroo Park	New South Wales		Peter Larner	Elfin 620
7	Oran Park	New South Wales		Paul Bernasconi	Mawer 004
8	Calder	Victoria		Peter Finlay	Palliser WD4

== Points system ==
Drivers were required to drop the points from their worst round from their totals. This round could not be the Surfers Paradise round, which was the only round held outside of the states of Victoria and New South Wales.

== Series results ==
Position	Driver	Car	Entrant	Total
1	Paul Bernasconi	Mawer 004	Grace Bros Levis Racing Team	56
2	Peter Finlay	Palliser WD4	Grace Bros Levis Racing Team	52
=	Peter Larner	Elfin 620	Peter Larner	52
4	John Davis	Bowin P4X	John Davis	40
5	Russell Norden	Birrana F71		28
=	Laurie Bennett	Elfin 600	Laurie Bennett	28
7	John Tuxford	Bowin P4A	John Tuxford	24
8	Alan Whitchurch	Bowin P4A	Alan Whitchurch	21
9	Peter Perkins	Elfin 620	Peter Perkins	18
10	Graeme Peart	Wren	Graeme Peart	12
