= 1979 TAA Formula Ford Driver To Europe Series =

Motor racing competition

The 1979 TAA Formula Ford Driver to Europe Series was an Australian motor racing competition open to Formula Ford racing cars. The series, which was the tenth national series for Formula Fords to be held in Australia, was won by Russell Norden driving a Mawer 004.

== Series schedule ==
The series was contested over eight rounds.

Round	Circuit	Date	Round winner	Car	Entrant
1	Sandown	February	Russell Nordern	Mawer 004	Bonds Coats Patons Ltd
2	Oran Park	25 February	Wally Storey	Elwyn 002	Bracks Slacks Pty Ltd
3	Calder		Russell Nordern	Mawer 004	Bonds Coats Patons Ltd
4	Amaroo Park		Stephen Brook	Bowin P6F	
5	Surfers Paradise		Russell Nordern	Mawer 004	Bonds Coats Patons Ltd
6	Adelaide International Raceway	3 June	Russell Nordern	Mawer 004	Bonds Coats Patons Ltd
7	Amaroo Park		Russell Nordern	Mawer 004	Bonds Coats Patons Ltd
8	Oran Park	July	Russell Nordern	Mawer 004	Bonds Coats Patons Ltd

== Points system ==
Points were awarded on a 15, 12, 10, 8, 6, 5, 4, 3, 2, 1 basis for the first ten places at each round.

== Series results ==
Position	Driver	Car	Entrant	Points
1	Russell Nordern	Mawer 004	Bonds Coats Patons Ltd	94
2	Wally Storey	Elwyn 002	Bracks Slacks Pty Ltd	91
3	Graham Smith	Bowin P4a	G Smith	63
4	Robyn Hamilton	Elfin 620B	R Hamilton; W Toet	58
5	Stephen Brook	Bowin P6F	Robert Curro Burwood; Ian Grainger	41
6	Richard Stiegler	Birrana F72	Bracks Slacks Pty Ltd	36
7	Russell Steel	Lola T440	Es-Car-Go Auto World	22
8	Don Bretland	Van Diemen	Magicparts	21
9	Gavin Green	Van Diemen	Ron Hodgson Racing	19
10	Tim Murray	Elfin		11
=	David Earle	Elfin Aero	Thomson Motor Auctions	11
13	Graeme Wilson	Elfin 600	G Wilson	7
14	Colin Jack	Bowin P4a	C Jack	6
15	Jeff Summers	Elfin 620	J Summers	5
=	Ian Grainger	Bowin P4a		5
=	Elwyn Bickley			5
=	Chris Davison	Elfin 620B	Chris Davison	5
=	Chris Patterson	Carboro	C Patterson	5
=	Alan Swindells	Bowin P6	A Swindells	5
21	Russell Allen	Hawke	Russell Allen	4
22	Alan Fisher			3
=	Geoff Howat	Bowin P4a	Boris Orazem Automotive	3
24	McLeod			2
=	Gary Parkinson			2
25	Sanderson			1
=	Stephen Finn			1

Note: All cars were powered by 1600cc Ford production block engines.
