= 1984 Formula Ford Driver to Europe Series =

The 1984 Formula Ford Driver to Europe Series was an Australian motor racing competition open to Formula Ford racing cars. It was the 15th Australian Formula Ford Series.

The series was won by Ron Barnacle driving a Royale RP31.

== Calendar ==
The series was contested over eight rounds with one race per round.

Round	Circuit	Date	Round winner	Car	Entrant
1	Sandown	19 February	Ron Barnacle	Royale RP31	Dolphin Race Hire
2	Oran Park	18 March	Michael Quinn	Lola T642A	
3	Surfers Paradise	13 May	Alan Swindells	Van Diemen	
4	Oran Park	27 May	Michael Quinn	Lola T642A	
5	Amaroo Park	5 August	Ron Barnacle	Royale RP31	Dolphin Race Hire
6	Sandown	9 September	Tomas Mezera	Reynard FF84	Dalcar Industries
7	Winton	14 October	Bradley Forgeard	Lola T642A	
8	Calder	18 November	Ron Barnacle	Royale RP31	Dolphin Race Hire

== Points system ==
Points were awarded on a 20-15-12-10-8-6-4-3-2-1 basis for the first ten positions at each round.

== Series standings ==
Position	Driver	Car	Entrant	San	Ora	Sur	Ora	Ama	San	Win	Cal	Total
1	Ron Barnacle	Royale RP31	Dolphin Race Hire	20	10	2	-	20	15	4	20	91
2	Garry Jones	Van Diemen	Garry Jones	8	15	12	12	2	12	8	6	75
3	Michael Quinn	Lola T642A		15	20	-	20	-	-	-	-	55
4	Geoff Walters	Elwyn 003		-	2	-	15	10	10	15	-	52
5	Tomas Mezera	Reynard FF84	Dalcar Industries	-	6	8	-	15	20	-	-	49
6	Bradley Forgeard	Van Diemen; Lola T642A		2	3	6	8	4	-	20	-	43
7	Laurie Bennett	Wren		10	-	-	-	-	6	10	12	38
8	Richard Carter	Matek M1		-	12	15	-	8	-	-	-	35
9	Alan Bisset	Reynard		-	-	-	-	-	-	12	15	27
10	Rodney Moody	Birrana		3	4	-	10	-	-	-	8	25
11	Alan Swindells	Van Diemen		-	1	20	-	-	-	-	-	21
12	Ian Thomas	Reynard		-	-	10	6	-	-	-	-	16
13	Tony Boot	Totem		-	-	-	-	-	3	-	10	13
=14	Mark Forrester	Reynard		12	-	-	-	-	-	-	-	12
=14	Jim Hunter	Royale		4	8	-	-	-	-	-	-	12
=14	Malcolm Oastler	Bowin P6		-	-	-	-	12	-	-	-	12
17	Steve Moody	Totem 002		-	-	4	3	-	1	3	-	11
=18	Greg Kentwell	Elwyn		6	-	1	-	-	-	-	3	10
=18	Roger Martin	PRS		-	-	-	-	-	4	6	-	10
20	Barry Ward	Galloway		-	-	-	-	-	8	-	-	8
=21	David Harrison	Elfin		-	-	-	2	-	-	-	4	6
=21	Tim Murray	Elwyn 003		-	-	-	-	6	-	-	-	6
23	Scott Elson	Wren		-	-	-	4	-	-	-	-	4
=24	Martin Tighe	Van Diemen		-	-	3	-	-	-	-	-	3
=24	Mathew Kane	Bowin P4A		-	-	-	-	-	3	-	-	3
=26	Teddy Angelo	Hawke		-	-	-	-	-	2	-	-	2
=26	Mark Poole	Elfin		-	-	-	-	-	-	2	-	2
=26	Lyndon Arnel			-	-	-	-	-	-	-	2	2
=29	Steven Pryce	PRS 83F		1	-	-	-	-	-	-	-	1
=29	Jon McKeon	Hawke DL17		-	-	-	1	-	-	-	-	1
=29	Kevin Lewis	Bowin P4		-	-	-	-	1	-	-	-	1
=29	Warwick Henderson	Wren		-	-	-	-	-	-	1	-	1
=29	Lindsay Yardley	Bowin P6F		-	-	-	-	-	-	-	1	1
