= 1982 TAA Formula Ford Driver to Europe Series =

The 1982 TAA Formula Ford Driver to Europe Series was an Australian motor racing competition for Racing Cars complying with Australian Formula Ford regulations. It was the thirteenth annual Australian national series for Formula Fords.

The series was won by Jeff Summers driving an Elfin 620B.

== Schedule ==
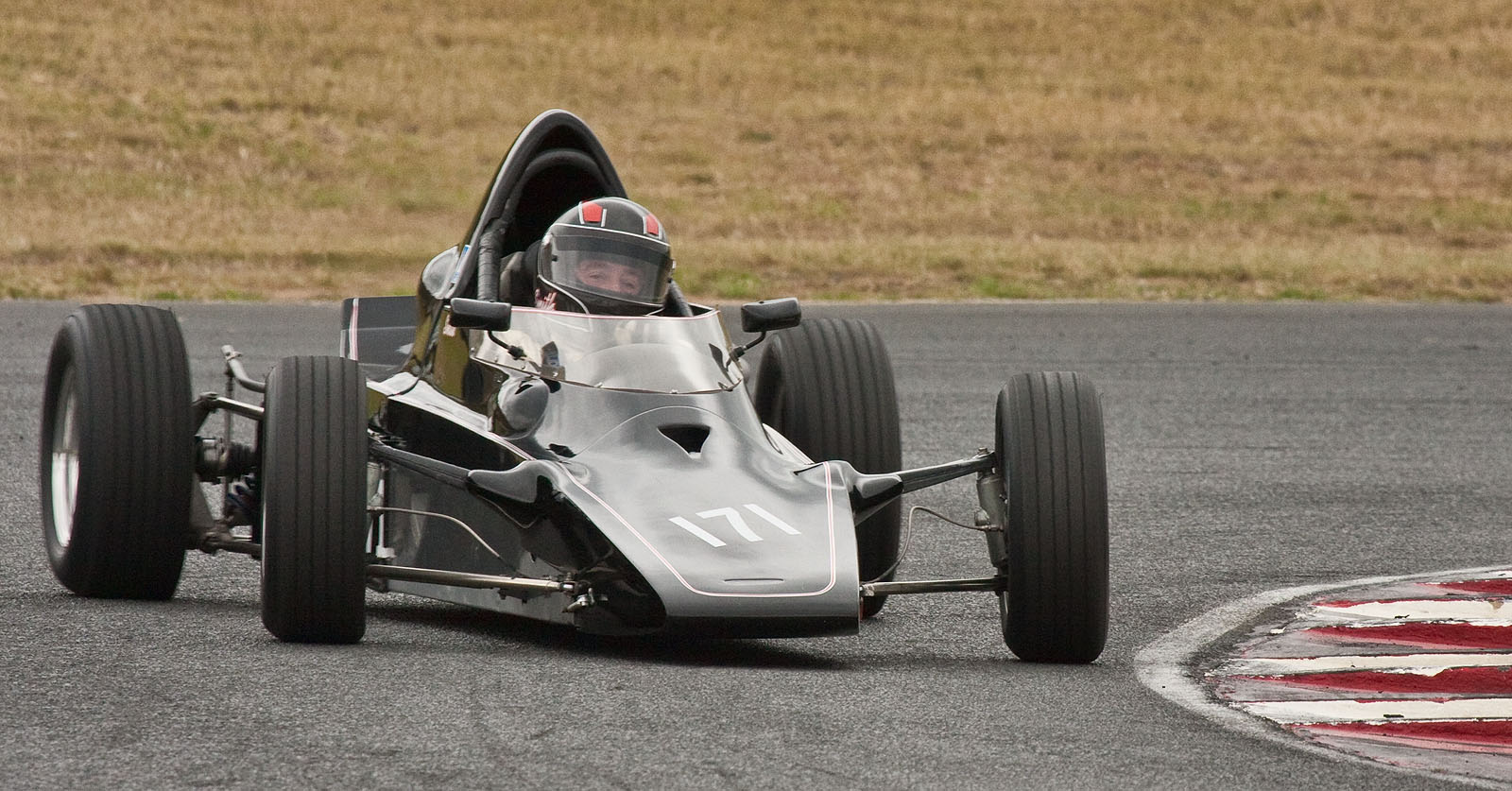
Warren Smith placed 3rd in the series driving a Lola T440 similar to the example pictured above

The series was contested over eight rounds.

Round	Circuit	Date	Round winner	Car
1	Sandown	14 February	Jeff Summers	Elfin 620B
2	Amaroo Park	11 April	Garry Tully	Elfin 620B
3	Surfers Paradise	16 May	Chris Clearihan	Bowin P4A
4	Oran Park	6 June	Geoff Walters	Elwyn 003
5	Amaroo Park	11 July	Garry Tully	Elfin 620B
6	Calder	1 August	Jeff Summers	Elfin 620B
7	Oran Park	22 August	Jon McGinn	Bowin P6F
8	Sandown	12 September	Warren Smith	Lola T440

Round 2 was to be held at an Oran Park meeting in March but, after that meeting was cancelled, an additional round was scheduled at a meeting at the same circuit in August.

== Points system ==
Points were awarded on a 20, 15, 12, 10, 8, 6, 4, 3, 2, 1 basis for the first ten places at each round.

== Series standings ==
Position	Driver	Car	Entrant	San	Ama	Sur	Ora	Ama	Cal	Ora	San	Total
1	Jeff Summers	Elfin 620B	J Summers	20	-	15	8	15	20	6	15	99
2	Garry Tully	Elfin 620B	G Tully	10	20	1	10	20	-	3	2	66
3	Warren Smith	Lola T440	Bob Holden Motors Manly Vale	-	2	10	6	12	-	15	20	65
4	Jon McGinn	Birrana F73; Bowin P6F	J McGinn; Edward Vieusseux Racing	6	-	-	12	-	12	20	4	54
5	Geoff Walters	Elwyn 003	G Walters	-	10	2	20	8	-	10	-	50
6	Chris Davison	Elfin 620B	C Davison	4	-	-	15	10	-	8	8	45
7	Warwick Rooklyn	Mawer 004	W Rooklyn	3	15	-	-	3	8	12	-	41
8	Laurie Bennett	Wren	L Bennett	15	12	-	-	6	4	2	1	40
9	Bruce Connolly	Galloway	B Connolly	-	-	-	-	2	15	-	10	27
10	Chris Clearihan	Bowin P4A	C Clearihan	1	1	20	-	-	-	-	-	22
11	Don Bretland	Van Diemen RF77	D Bretland	8	8	-	-	4	-	-	-	20
12	Tim Murray	Elwyn	T Murray	12	-	6	-	-	-	-	-	18
=	Gary Brabham	Birrana	GT Brabham	-	-	-	-	-	6	-	12	18
14	David Roberts	PRS RH01	D Roberts	-	4	4	4	-	-	-	-	12
=	Alan Swindells	Bowin P6F	A Swindells	-	-	12	-	-	-	-	-	12
16	David Stanley	Image Mk3	D Stanley	-	-	8	2	1	-	-	-	11
17	Neil Cunningham	Van Diemen	Alan Gow	-	-	-	-	-	10	-	-	10
=	Matthew Ruggles	Rennmax BN3	Bob Holden Motors Manly Vale	-	-	3	-	-	-	1	6	10
19	Tomas Mezera	Carlboro	T Mezera	-	6	-	3	-	-	-	-	9
20	Steve Farrell	Elwyn 003	Milldent Motorsport	-	-	-	-	-	-	4	-	4
21	Roger Martin	PRS	R Martin	-	-	-	-	-	3	-	-	3
=	Robert Benson	Wren 004	R Benson	-	3	-	-	-	-	-	-	3
=	Rodney Moody	Birrana F72	R Moody	-	-	-	-	-	-	-	3	3
24	Ron Barnacle	Elfin 620B	Nissalco Garage Equipment	2	-	-	-	-	-	-	-	2
=	John Edmonds	Birrana	J Edmonds	-	-	-	-	-	2	-	-	2
26	Mark Day	Wren	M Day	-	-	-	1	-	-	-	-	1
=	Alan Bisset	Wren 801	A Bisset	-	-	-	-	-	1	-	-	1

Cars were powered by 1.6 litre Ford engines, as mandated by Australian Formula Ford regulations.
