= 1970 Formula Ford National Series =

The 1970 Formula Ford National Series was an Australian motor racing competition open to Formula Ford racing cars. It was the first annual Australian series for Formula Fords.

The series was won by Richard Knight driving an Elfin 600.

== Series schedule ==
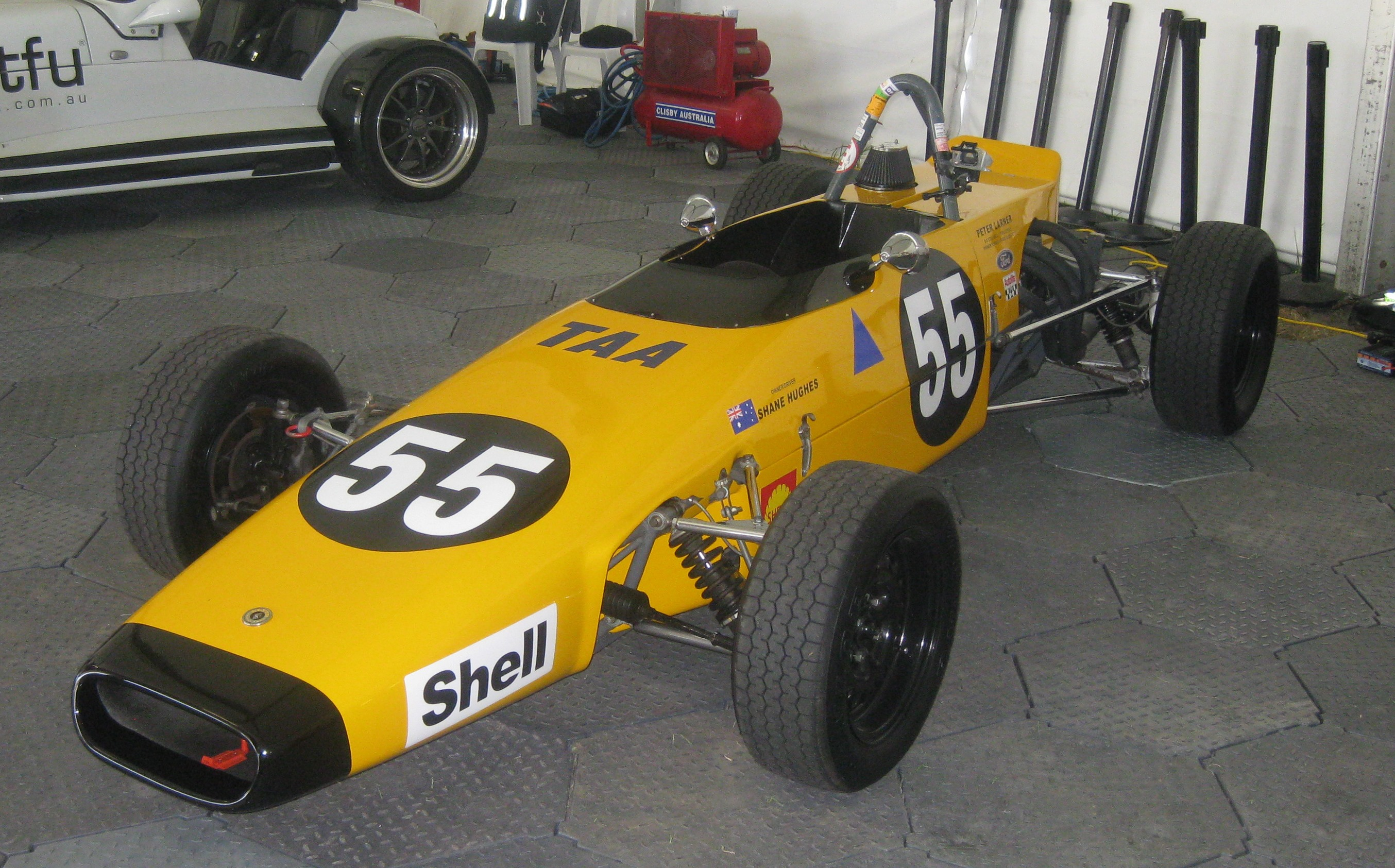
Richard Knight won the series driving an Elfin 600 similar to that pictured above

The series was contested over six rounds with one race per round.

Round	Circuit	State	Date	Round winner	Car
1	Sandown	Victoria	19 April	Richard Knight	Elfin 600
2	Amaroo Park	New South Wales		Richard Knight	Elfin 600
3	Oran Park	New South Wales		Richard Knight	Elfin 600
4	Warwick Farm	New South Wales	6 September	Bob Beasley	Bowin P4A
5	Phillip Island	Victoria		Richard Knight	Elfin 600
6	Warwick Farm	New South Wales	22 November	Richard Knight	Elfin 600

== Points system ==
Series points were awarded on a 9-6-4-3-2-1 basis for the first six places at each round.

== Series standings ==
Position	Driver	Car	Entrant	Points
1	Richard Knight	Elfin 600	B.S. Stillwell & Co.	74
2	Bob Beasley	Bowin P4A	Wright Ford Motors	71
3	Gary Rush	Bowin P4A	Byrt Ford Pty. Ltd.	30
4	Phillip Webber	Elfin 600	New Oakley Motors	26
5	Larry Perkins	Elfin 600	B.S. Stillwell & Co.	22
6	David Green	Wren	Morley Ford	18
7	Murray Coombs	Wren	John Lucas Ford	11
8	John Edmunds	Aztec AR8		8
9	Geoff Hood	Wren	Peter Wright Ford	5
10	Peter Stege	Elfin 600	Peter Stege	4
