= 1976 TAA Formula Ford Driver to Europe Series =

Australian motor racing competition

The 1976 TAA Formula Ford Driver to Europe Series was an Australian motor racing competition open to Formula Ford racing cars. It was the seventh Australian national series for Formula Fords. The series was won by Richard Carter driving a Birrana F73.

== Series schedule ==
The series was contested over eight rounds.

Round	Circuit	Date	Round winner	Car	Entrant
1	Sandown		Garry Dubois	Elfin 620B	Garry Dubois
2	Calder	14 March	John Davis	Bowin P4X	Grace Brothers Race Team
3	Oran Park		Garry Dubois	Elfin 620B	Garry Dubois
4	Amaroo Park	18 April	Richard Carter	Birrana F73	Grace Brothers Race Team
5	Surfers Paradise		Russell Norden	Mawer 004	Russell Norden Racing
6	Amaroo Park	15 August	John Smith	Bowin P4A	Lappington Inn
7	Oran Park		John Smith	Bowin P4A	Lappington Inn
8	Calder		John Smith	Bowin P4A	Lappington Inn

== Series results ==
Position	Driver	Car	Entrant	San	Cal	Ora	Ama	Sur	Ama	Ora	Cal	Total
1	Richard Carter	Birrana F73	Grace Brothers Race Team	9	9	8	10	8	-	7	6	57
2	John Smith	Bowin P4A	John Smith / Lappington Inn	4	-	7	8	-	10	10	10	49
3	John Davis	Bowin P4X	Grace Brothers Race Team	8	10	5	7	9	-	-	5	44
4	Michael Quinn	Bowin P4A	Michael Quinn Racing	5	7	6	4	-	-	9	8	39
5	Terry Shiel	Birrana F71	Terry Shiel	6	-	3	9	7	-	-	3	28
6	Garry Dubois	Elfin 620B	Garry Dubois	10	-	10	6	-	-	-	-	26
7	John Tuxford	Bowin P4A	John Tuxford	-	8	4	-	6	-	6	-	24
8	Russell Norden	Mawer 004	Russell Norden Racing	-	3	9	-	10	-	-	-	22
=	Stephen Brook	Bowin P6F	Stephen Brook	-	-	-	5	-	9	8	-	22
10	Laurie Bennett	Elfin 600	Laurie Bennett	7	-	-	-	3	6	1	1	18
11	Barry Ward	Birrana F72	Barry Ward	-	6	-	3	-	7	-	-	16
12	Barry Green	Palliser WDF4	Barry Green	-	-	-	-	-	-	5	9	14
13	Larry Storey	Elwyn	L Storey	3	4	2	-	-	-	4	-	13
14	Don Bretland	Elfin 620B	Don Bretland	-	-	1	-	-	8	2	-	11
15	Greg Carroll	Elfin 620	Greg Carroll	-	5	-	-	5	-	-	-	10
16	Richard Davison	Elfin 600	Richard Davison	2	-	-	2	-	-	-	4	8
17	Peter McInnes			-	-	-	-	-	-	-	7	7
18	Gerry Burges	Bowin P6F	Gerry Burges	1	1	-	-	2	-	-	-	4
=	Stephen Moody	Birrana F72	Stephen Moody	-	-	-	-	4	-	-	-	4
=	Paul McLucas	Elfin 600	Paul McLucas	-	-	-	-	-	4	-	-	4
21	Ron Barnacle			-	-	-	-	-	-	3	-	3
=	Stephen Cromer	Bowin P4A	Stephen Cromer	-	-	-	-	-	3	-	-	3
23	Peter Krefel	Royale	Peter Krefel	-	2	-	-	-	-	-	-	2
=	Ron Baddeley	Elfin	Ron Baddeley	-	-	-	-	-	-	-	2	2
25	Len Croughan	Elfin 620	Len Croughan	-	-	-	1	-	-	-	-	1
=	Stuart Hooper	Bowin	Stuart Hooper	-	-	-	-	1	-	-	-	1

- All cars were powered by mandatory 1600cc Ford pushrod engines.
- Only seven drivers were awarded points at Round 6 for reasons unknown.
