= 1987 Motorcraft Formula Ford Driver to Europe Series =

The 1987 Motorcraft Formula Ford Driver to Europe Series was an Australian motor racing competition open to Formula Ford racing cars. It was the 18th Australian Formula Ford Series.

The series was won by Peter Verheyen driving a Van Diemen RF86.

== Calendar ==
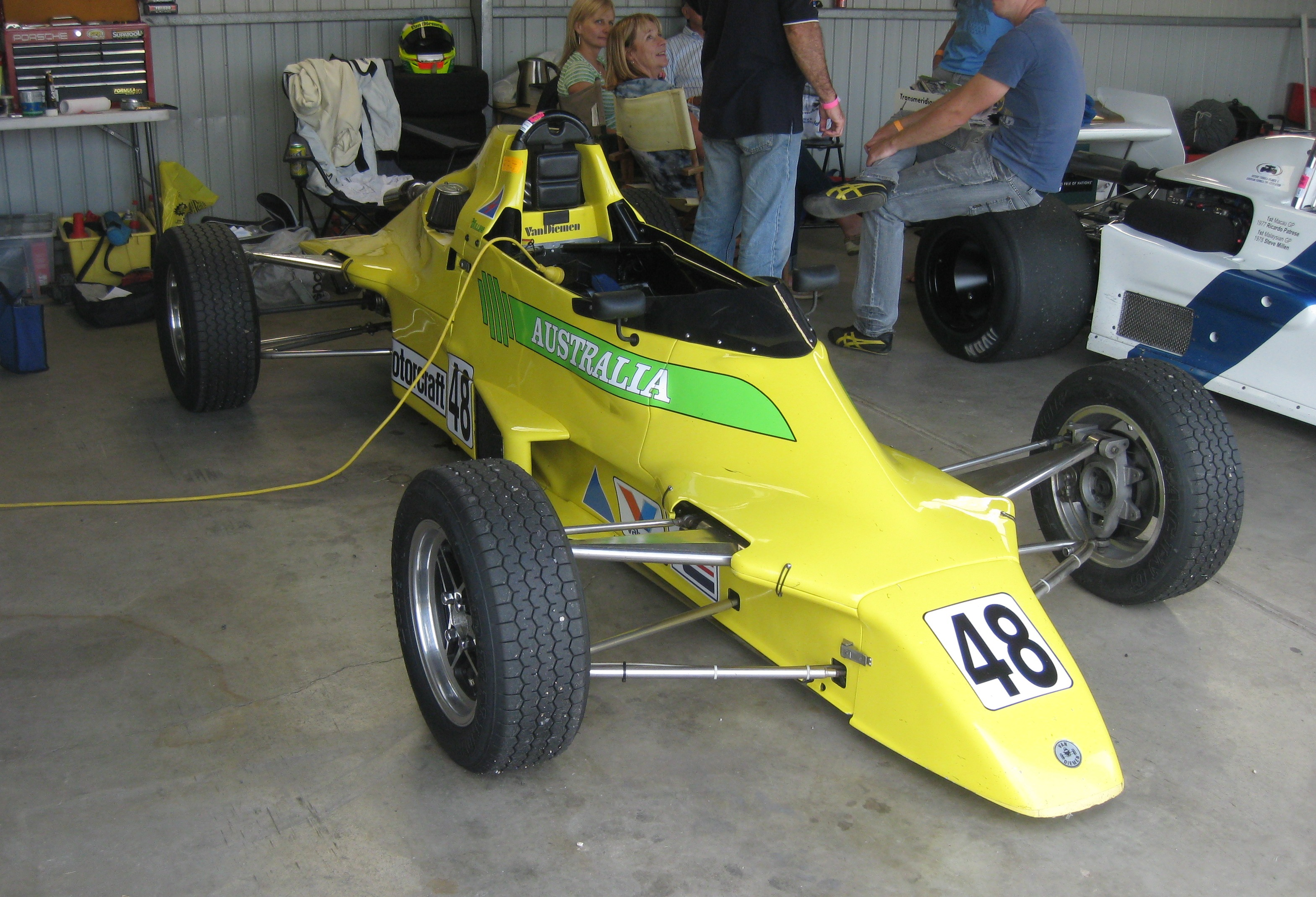
Peter Verheyen won the series driving a Van Diemen RF86 similar to that pictured above

The series was contested over nine rounds with one race per round.

Round	Circuit	Date	Round winner	Car
1	Oran Park	15 February	David Brabham	Van Diemen RF86
2	Winton	22 March	Peter Verheyen	Van Diemen RF86
3	Surfers Paradise		Peter Verheyen	Van Diemen RF86
4	Sandown Park	7 June	Geoff Walters	Van Diemen RF86
5	Oran Park	5 July	Geoff Walters	Van Diemen RF86
6	Amaroo Park	2 August	Geoff Walters	Van Diemen RF86
7	Adelaide International Raceway	23 August	Mike Mortimer	Van Diemen RF86
8	Calder Park		Martin Carpenter	Van Diemen RF86
9	Adelaide Parklands Circuit	14 November	Martin Carpenter	Van Diemen RF86

== Series standings ==
Position	Driver	Car	Entrant	Ora	Win	Sur	San	Ora	Am	AIR	Cal	Ade	Total
1	Peter Verheyen	Van Diemen RF86	Peter Verheyen	15	20	20	10	-	12	10	-	12	99
2	Geoff Walters	Van Diemen RF86	Formula Ford Race Hire	8	8	2	20	20	20	8	8	-	94
3	Martin Carpenter	Van Diemen RF86	Grand Prix Sportique	-	12	-	-	10	15	15	20	20	92
4	David Roberts	Van Diemen RF86	David Roberts	-	-	15	15	15	-	-	15	6	66
5	Roger Martin	PRS / Spectrum	Roger Martin	6	10	12	6	-	6	-	6	8	54
=6	Robert Bennett	RPB	Robert Bennett	3	6	6	12	12	-	4	-	-	43
=6	Garry Jones	Van Diemen RF82	Garry Jones	12	15	-	-	-	-	-	1	15	43
8	Mike Mortimer	Van Diemen RF86	Belgrave 2 Way Radio Centre	-	-	-	-	-	2	20	12	1	35
9	Andrew Gubb	Elwyn 003	Formula Ford Race Hire	4	4	3	-	8	-	-	10	-	29
=10	Andrew Burden	Elwyn 003	Andrew Burden	10	1	-	8	3	-	-	-	-	22
=10	Laurie Bennett	Wren	Laurie Bennett	-	-	1	2	-	3	12	4	-	22
12	David Brabham	Van Diemen RF86		20	-	-	-	-	-	-	-	-	20
13	Richard Carter	Matek M1	Richard Carter	-	-	-	-	1	8	-	-	10	19
14	Simon Kane	Mawer 004	Clive Kane Photography	-	-	-	1	6	10	-	-	-	17
15	Brett Peters	Flamecrusher	Brett Peters	-	-	8	-	4	1	-	-	-	13
16	Alan Swindells	Reynard FF84	Alan Swindells	-	-	10	-	-	-	-	-	-	10
17	Stephen Moody	Totem BM1	Stephen Moody	1	-	-	3	-	-	-	2	3	9
18	Alan Fish	Elwyn 003	Alan Fish	-	-	4	-	-	4	-	-	-	8
19	Phil De Wit	Elfin 620B	Alltoy Spares	-	-	-	4	-	-	3	-	-	7
20	Greg Hoogstrate	Elfin 620B	Greg Hoogstrate	-	-	-	-	-	-	6	-	-	6
21	Mark Larkham	Van Diemen RF81	Australian Sheet & Coil Pty Ltd	-	-	-	-	-	-	1	-	4	5
22	Andrew Clifford	Reynard FF84	Andrew Clifford	-	2	-	-	-	-	-	-	2	4
=23	Mark Seaton	Elfin 620B	Mark Seaton	-	3	-	-	-	-	-	-	-	3
=23	Mark Williamson	Bowin P6	Mark Williamson	-	-	-	-	-	-	-	3	-	3
=25	Tony Boot	Totem FF001	Tony Boot	2	-	-	-	-	-	-	-	-	2
=25	Glen Clark	Elwyn 003	Formula Ford Race Hire	-	-	-	-	2	-	-	-	-	2
=25	Russell Ingall	Elfin	David Craig	-	-	-	-	-	-	2	-	-	2

- The 1600cc Ford "Kent" engine was mandatory for all cars.
