= Australian Formula Ford Championship =

Motor racing competition

- Category: Open Wheel Racing; Formula Ford
- Country: Australia
- Inaugural season: 1970
- Engine suppliers: 1.6 litre Ford Duratec
- Tyre suppliers: Yokohama
- Drivers' champion: Seth Burchartz
- Teams' champion: Sonic Motor Racing Services
- Official website: formulaford.com.au

The Australian Formula Ford Championship is an Australian motor racing competition for drivers of Formula Ford racing cars, held annually since 1970. From 1970 until 1992 it was a national series and from 1993 until 2013 the series was sanctioned by the Confederation of Australian Motor Sport as the Australian Formula Ford Championship. From 2014 to 2018 it reverted to national series status. The Australian Formula Ford Championship name was then applied to the series by the Formula Ford Association from 2019.

Australian Formula Ford is renowned for producing future champions in other categories with many V8 Supercar drivers and Australian international open-wheeler drivers having had a background in the category.

== History ==
The Formula Ford category was established in Great Britain in 1967 and two years later Australia's first Formula Ford race was staged at the Sandown circuit in Victoria. A national series was contested in Australia for the first time in 1970 and then annually through to 1992. In the following year the series was granted national title status by CAMS and officially became the Australian Formula Ford Championship. After having powered Australian Formula Fords since the introduction of the category, the 1600cc Ford "Kent" engine was replaced by the third-generation Ford Fiesta unit for the 2006 Australian Championship. The "Kent" powered cars continued to be raced in various State championships under the "Formula Ford 1600" category name.

The series has served as a stepping stone for many Australian racing drivers who have gone on to greater things in motor racing both in Australia and overseas. Notably, 1971 winner Larry Perkins went on to race in the Formula One World Championship and other winners Russell Ingall, Craig Lowndes, Garth Tander and Jamie Whincup have each gone on to claim V8 Supercar titles. Other graduates of Australian Formula Ford include Brad Jones, Marcos Ambrose, Tomas Mezera, Jason Bright, Steven Richards, David Besnard, Will and Alex Davison, and nine-time Formula One race winner Mark Webber finished third in the F1 World championship on three occasions.

Formula Ford has also proven a popular proving ground for Australian racing car manufacturers. In its early years the series was dominated by Australian designs from Elfin Sports Cars, Bowin Cars, Mawer and Birrana. 1987 to 1997 was dominated by the British marque Van Diemen, winning eleven straight titles. The streak was broken in 1998 by Australian marque Spectrum, built by Borland Racing Developments. Van Diemen faded in the mid-2000s and Australian grids are now almost exclusively filled with Spectrums and French made Mygales.

Once mainly the domain of competitor self-run teams, the modern series is dominated by professional racing teams. Sonic Motor Racing Services and Synergy Motorsport both field multi-car teams, while some of those and Spectrum works team Borland Racing Developments also compete in the Victorian Formula Ford championship.

== Australian Formula Ford Series ==
In August 2013 the Confederation of Australian Motor Sport announced that the Australian Formula Ford Championship would be discontinued at the end of 2013. The Formula Ford Association subsequently announced that approval had been obtained from CAMS to organize a national series for 2014. It was contested over six rounds and was officially known as the Australian Formula Ford Series. "Kent" powered cars were re-introduced for the 2014 series.

During the 2016 season, the championship ran one event at a race meeting sanctioned by the Australian Auto Sport Alliance. [AASA]

In 2017, the Queensland round was run at a "RACERS' sanctioned race meeting.

For 2018 four of the seven rounds will be run at CAMS sanctioned race meetings, two at the AASA sanctioned "AMRS" series, and one at Queensland Raceway again.

The winner of the Australian Formula Ford Series was awarded a "golden ticket" to the INDYCAR Road to Indy Shootout, provided the driver is age-eligible per INDYCAR regulations. If the winner is ineligible (as was the case in 2016 because of age), the driver highest in points eligible for the award will claim the prize. The 2018 Australian Formula Ford winner won the Shootout, and was awarded a 2019 USF2000 ride fully funded by the promoters.

Now the winner is awarded a test in a current gen DJR supercar.

== State championships ==
Formula Ford has also proved to be a very popular category for state level series and championships, including competitions held in New South Wales, Victoria, Queensland, Western Australia and South Australia. In the majority these championships continue to utilise the first-generation Ford Kent engine. State level series have served as a stepping stone for kart racers looking for a cheap entry level into circuit racing before moving into the national series. State series often provided additional cars to the national series.

== Series winners and Australian Champions ==
=== National Series ===
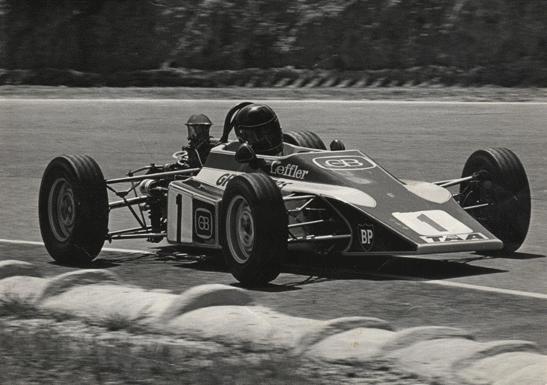
John Leffler won the 1973 TAA Formula Ford Driver to Europe Series driving a Bowin P4a and a Bowin P6F (pictured)

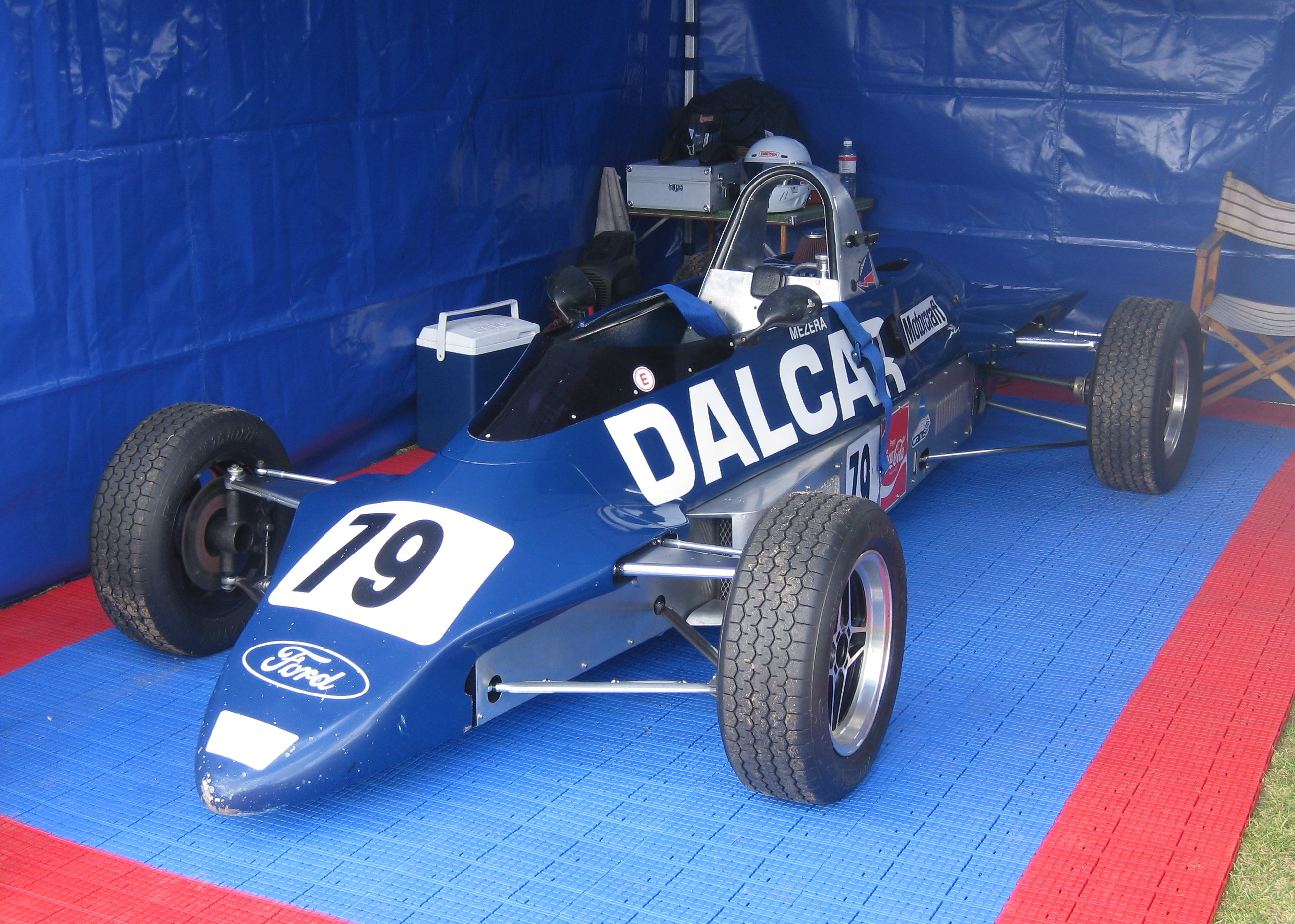
The Reynard FF83 with which Tomas Mezera won the 1985 Motorcraft Formula Ford Driver to Europe Series

Season	Series name	Series winner	Car
1970	Formula Ford National Series	Richard Knight	Elfin 600 FF
1971	National Formula Ford Driver to Europe Series	Larry Perkins	Elfin 600 FF
1972	TAA Formula Ford Driver to Europe Series	Bob Skelton	Bowin P4a
1973	TAA Formula Ford Driver to Europe Series	John Leffler	Bowin P4a & Bowin P6F
1974	TAA Formula Ford Driver to Europe Series	Terry Perkins	Elfin 620FF & Titan
1975	TAA Formula Ford Driver to Europe Series	Paul Bernasconi	Mawer 004
1976	TAA Formula Ford Driver to Europe Series	Richard Carter	Birrana F73
1977	TAA Formula Ford Driver to Europe Series	John Smith	Bowin P4A
1978	TAA Formula Ford Driver to Europe Series	John Wright	Bowin P4A
1979	TAA Formula Ford Driver to Europe Series	Russell Norden	Mawer 004
1980	TAA Formula Ford Driver to Europe Series	Stephen Brook	Lola T440
1981	TAA Formula Ford Driver to Europe Series	Phillip Revell	Lola T440
1982	TAA Formula Ford Driver to Europe Series	Jeff Summers	Elfin 620B
1983	Formula Ford Driver to Europe Series	Bruce Connolly	Galloway & Van Diemen
1984	Formula Ford Driver to Europe Series	Ron Barnacle	Royale RP31
1985	Motorcraft Formula Ford Driver to Europe Series	Tomas Mezera	Reynard FF83; Elwyn 003
1986	Motorcraft Formula Ford Driver to Europe Series	Warwick Rooklyn	Elwyn 003
1987	Motorcraft Formula Ford Driver to Europe Series	Peter Verheyen	Van Diemen RF86
1988	Motorcraft Formula Ford Driver to Europe Series	David Roberts	Van Diemen RF86
1989	Motorcraft Formula Ford Driver to Europe Series	Mark Larkham	Van Diemen RF89
1990	Motorcraft Formula Ford Driver to Europe Series	Russell Ingall	Van Diemen RF90
1991	Motorcraft Formula Ford Driver to Europe Series	Troy Dunstan	Van Diemen RF91
1992	Motorcraft Formula Ford Driver to Europe Series	Cameron McConville	Van Diemen RF92

=== Australian Formula Ford Championship ===
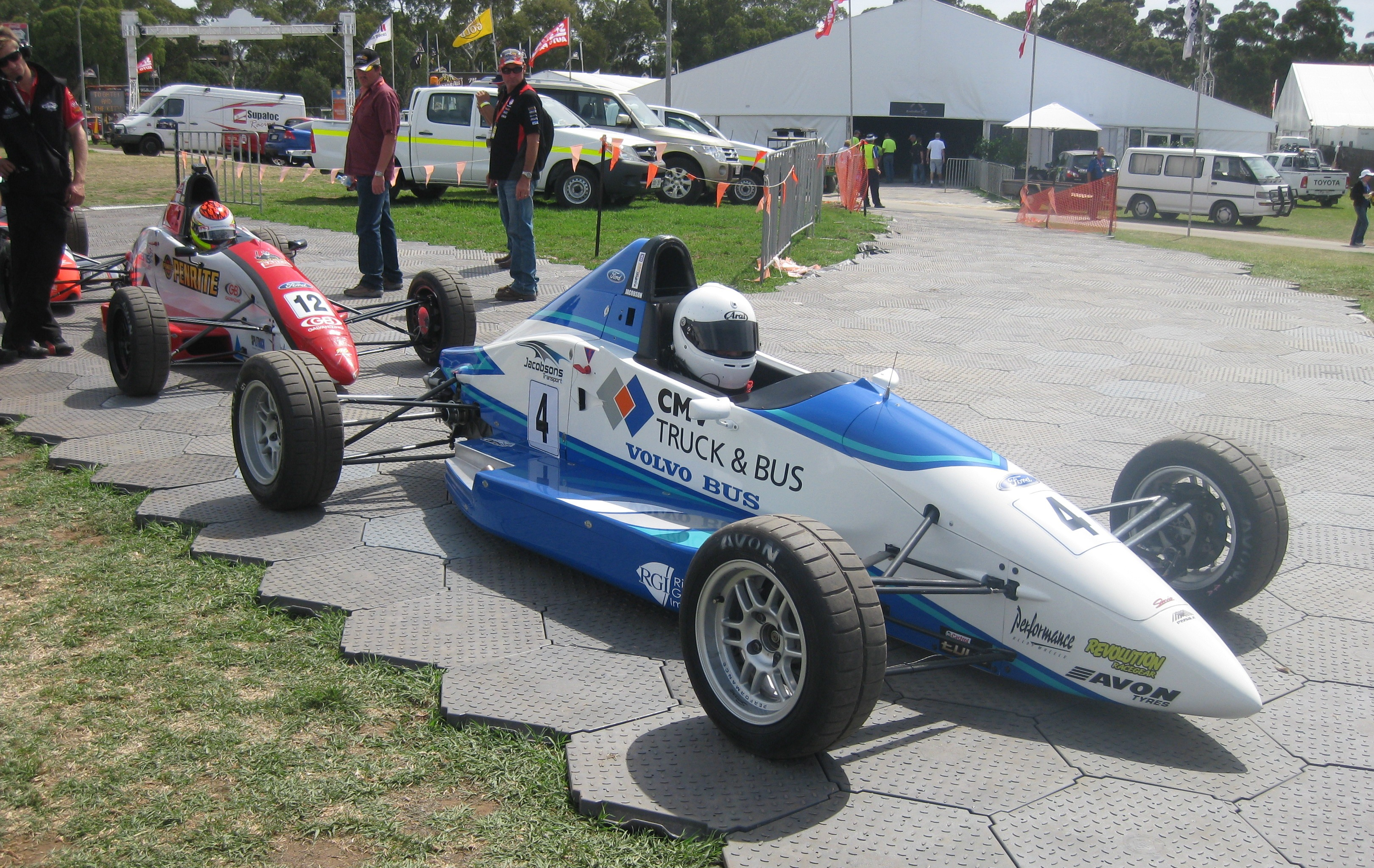
Garry Jacobson (Mygale SJ08a) at the opening round of the 2011 Championship

Season	Champion	Car
1993	Craig Lowndes	Van Diemen RF93
1994	Steven Richards	Van Diemen RF94
1995	Jason Bright	Van Diemen RF95
1996	David Besnard	Van Diemen RF96
1997	Garth Tander	Van Diemen RF95
1998	Adam Macrow	Spectrum 06
1999	Greg Ritter	Mygale SJ98
2000	Luke Youlden	Mygale SJ2000
2001	Will Davison	Van Diemen RF01
2002	Jamie Whincup	Van Diemen RF01
2003	Neil McFadyen	Stealth Van Diemen RF94
2004	David Reynolds	Van Diemen RF04
2005	Daniel Elliott	Van Diemen RF05
2006	John Martin	Spectrum 011
2007	Tim Blanchard	Mygale SJ07A
2008	Paul Laskazeski	Spectrum 011b
2009	Nick Percat	Mygale SJ07A
2010	Chaz Mostert	Spectrum 012
2011	Cam Waters	Mygale SJ10A
2012	Jack Le Brocq	Mygale SJ12A
2013	Anton de Pasquale	Mygale SJ13A

=== Australian Formula Ford Series ===
Season	Series winner	Car
2014	Thomas Randle	Mygale SJ13A
2015	Cameron Hill	Mygale SJ10A
2016	Leanne Tander	Mygale SJ10A
2017	Max Vidau	Mygale SJ10A
2018	Hunter McElrea	Mygale SJ10A

=== Australian Formula Ford Championship ===
Season	Champion	Car
2019	Angelo Mouzouris	Mygale SJ18A
2020	Not contested	
2021	Thomas Sargent	Mygale SJ13A
2022	Valentino Astuti	Mygale SJ15A
2023	Matthew Hillyer	Mygale SJ18A
2024	Eddie Beswick	Spectrum 014
2025	Kobi Williams	Spectrum 012b
2026	Seth Burchartz	Mygale SJ18A
