= John Leffler =

Australian racing driver

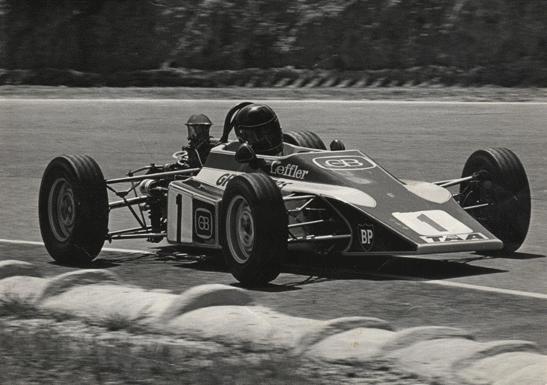
Leffler won the 1973 TAA Formula Ford Driver to Europe Series driving a Bowin P4a and a Bowin P6F (pictured)

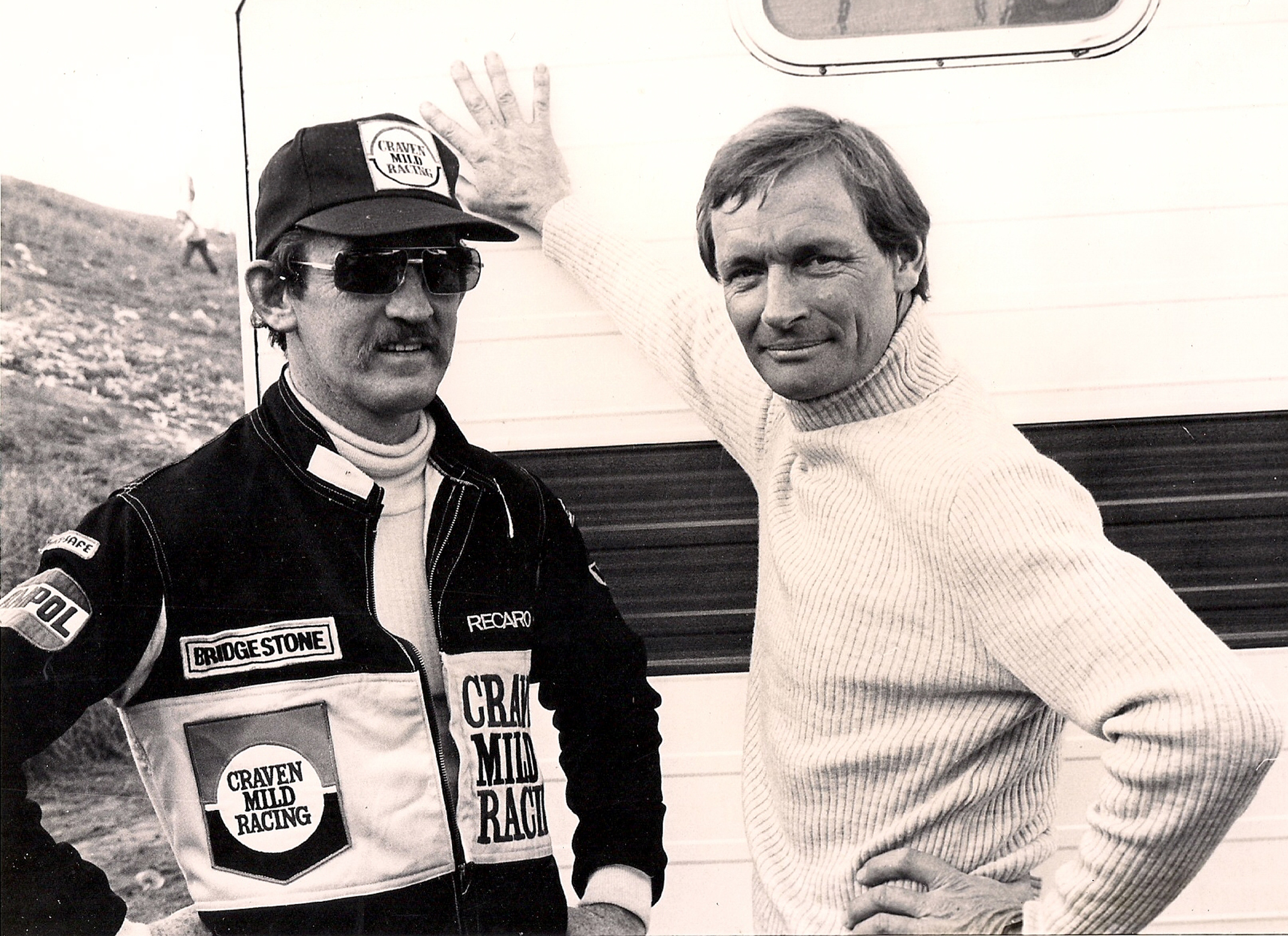
Leffler, pictured on the right with Allan Grice, in 1978

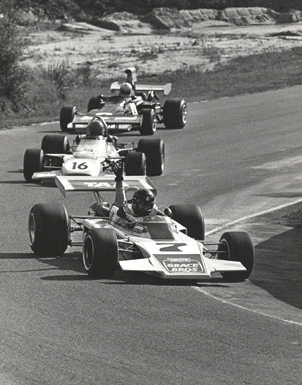
Bowin P8, driven by John Leffler

John William Myall Leffler (27 May 1940 – 11 June 2021) was an Australian racing driver. Leffler is best known for driving open-wheelers and winning the Australian Drivers' Championship in 1976.

Leffler drove Morris Coopers for many years in the 1960s. He finished second in the 1969 Rothmans 12 Hour Classic at Surfers Paradise driving a Morris Cooper S

In the early 1970s, Leffler ěturned his hand to Formula Ford racing a Bowin P6F in which he won the 1973 TAA Formula Ford Driver to Europe Series. In 1974 he contested the Australian Formula 2 Championship and finished third.

In 1975, Leffler stepped up to the Australian Drivers' Championship (the "Gold Star") and driving a Bowin P8 Chevrolet finished fifth in the series. The following year, he secured the 1976 Australian Drivers' Championship title in a Lola T400 with a string of consistent placings but without actually winning a round.

Leffler also co-drove for some of the leading Australian touring car drivers in endurance events. He co-drove with Bob Morris at the 1974 Sandown 250 finishing second in a Ron Hodgson Motors Holden Torana GTR XU-1 and at the 1978 Bathurst 1000 he came second with Allan Grice in a Craven Mild Racing Holden LX Torana SS A9X Hatchback. He is not related to Jason Leffler the IndyCar driver who was killed in 2013.

== Career results ==
Season	Championship / Series	Position	Car	Entrant
1972	TAA Formula Ford Driver to Europe Series	2nd	Bowin P4A Ford	Grace Bros. Race Team
1973	Australian Drivers' Championship	12th	Elfin MR5 Repco Holden	
1973	TAA Formula Ford Driver to Europe Series	1st	Bowin P4a Ford; Bowin P6F Ford	Grace Bros Race Team
1974	Australian Drivers' Championship	6th	Bowin P8 Ford	Grace Bros. Levi’s Racing Team
1974	Australian Formula 2 Championship	3rd	Bowin P8 Ford	Grace Bros. - Levi's Team
1975	Australian Drivers' Championship	5th	Bowin P8 Chevrolet	Grace Brothers Levi’s
1975	Australian Formula 2 Championship	10th	Brabham BT36 Ford	
1976	Australian Drivers' Championship	1st	Lola T400 Chevrolet	Grace Bros. Race Team
1976	Rothmans International Series	6th	Lola T400	Grace Bros. Racing Team
1977	Rothmans International Series	8th	Lola T400 Chevrolet	Grace Brothers Race Team
1977	Australian Drivers' Championship	2nd	Lola T400 Chevrolet	
1977	Rothmans International Series	8th	Lola T400	Grace Bros. Race Team
