= 1983 Formula Ford Driver to Europe Series =

The 1983 Formula Ford Driver to Europe Series was an Australian motor racing competition open to Formula Ford racing cars. The series, which was organised by the Light Car Club and the Formula Ford Association, was the fourteenth Australian national series for Formula Fords.

The series was won by Bruce Connolly driving a Galloway and a Van Diemen.

== Schedule ==
The series was contested over eight rounds with one race per round.

Round	Circuit	Date	Round winner	Car
1	Sandown	20 February	Bruce Connolly	Galloway
2	Amaroo Park	10 April	Bruce Connolly	Galloway
3	Surfers Paradise	15 May	Malcolm Oastler	Bowin
4	Oran Park	29 May	Michael Quinn	Lola
5	Amaroo Park	10 July	Malcolm Oastler	Bowin
6	Calder	31 July	Bruce Connolly	Galloway
7	Sandown	11 September	Malcolm Oastler	Bowin
8	Winton	16 October	Bruce Connolly	Van Diemen

== Points system ==
Points were awarded on a 20-15-12-10-8-6-4-3-2-1 basis for the first ten places at each round.

== Series standings ==
Position	Driver	Car	Entrant	San	Ama	Sur	Ora	Ama	San	Win	Total	
1	Bruce Connolly	Galloway & Van Diemen		20	20	8	15	12	20	15	20	130
2	Malcolm Oastler	Bowin		4	-	20	12	20	10	20	-	86
3	Geoff Walters	Elwyn		12	12	12	10	15	-	-	-	61
4	Laurie Bennett	Wren		10	8	3	-	6	-	10	12	49
5	Ron Barnacle	Elfin		-	6	4	-	8	8	6	15	47
6	Michael Quinn	Lola		-	15	-	20	10	-	-	-	45
7	David Roberts	PRS		15	2	10	8	-	-	4	-	39
8	Warwick Rooklyn	Royale		8	-	15	-	-	-	12	-	35
9	Mark Forrester	PRS		2	-	-	4	2	15	-	8	31
10	Mark Day	Wren		-	-	-	6	-	12	-	10	28
11	David Stanley	Image		-	10	6	-	4	-	-	-	20
12	Teddy Angelo	Hawk		6	-	-	-	-	3	-	6	15
13=	Gary Jones	Van Diemen		-	4	1	-	3	-	-	-	8
13=	John Edmonds	Birrana		-	-	-	-	-	6	2	-	8
13=	Peter Randalls	Elfin		-	-	-	-	-	-	8	-	8
13=	Roger Martin	PRS		1	3	-	-	-	-	-	4	8
17	David Harrison	Elfin		-	-	-	1	-	2	-	3	6
18=	Richard Carter	Matek		-	-	-	3	1	-	-	-	4
18=	Mark Grierson	Elfin		-	-	-	-	-	4	-	-	4
20=	Tim Murray	Elwyn		3	-	-	-	-	-	-	-	3
20=	Steve Price	Bowin		-	-	-	-	-	-	3	-	3
22=	Martin Tighe	Van Diemen		-	-	2	-	-	-	-	-	2
22=	Alan Bisset	Wren		-	-	-	2	-	-	-	-	2
22=	Paul Feltham	PRS		-	-	-	-	-	-	-	2	2
25=	Matthew Ruggles	Elfin		-	1	-	-	-	-	-	-	1
25=	Terry Kay	Bowin		-	-	-	-	-	1	-	-	1
25=	Anthony Swan	Hawk		-	-	-	-	-	-	1	-	1
25=	Chris Meaden	Elfin		-	-	-	-	-	-	-	1	1

Note: All cars were powered by a mandatory 1600cc Ford pushrod engine.
