= 1986 Motorcraft Formula Ford Driver to Europe Series =

The 1986 Motorcraft Formula Ford Driver to Europe Series was an Australian motor racing competition open to Formula Ford racing cars. It was the 17th Australian Formula Ford Series and the second to carry the Motorcraft Formula Ford Driver to Europe Series name.

The series was won by Warwick Rooklyn driving an Elwyn 003/004.

== Calendar ==
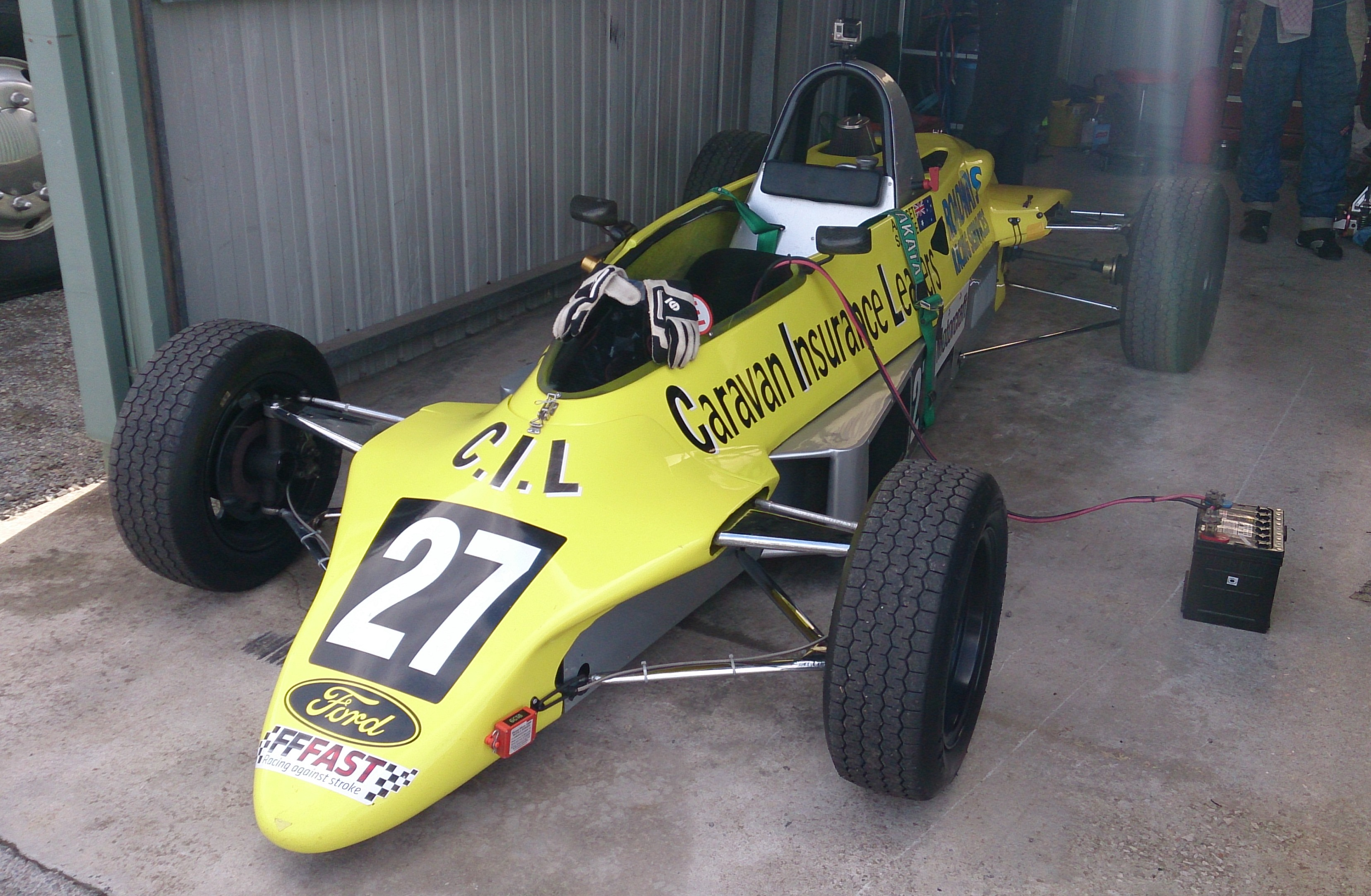
Alan Bisset placed second driving this Reynard 84FF. The car is pictured in 2015 in its 1986 colors.

The series was contested over eight rounds with one race per round.

Round	Circuit	Date	Winning driver	Winning car
1	Mallala	16 March	Warwick Rooklyn	Elwyn 003/004
2	Sandown	13 April	Geoff Walters	Elwyn 003
3	Surfers Paradise	18 May	David Brabham	Van Diemen RF85
4	Oran Park	8 June	Dave Stanley	Elwyn 003
5	Winton	29 June	Alan Bisset	Reynard 84FF
6	Oran Park	13 July	Andrew Burden	Lola T624A
7	Amaroo Park	3 August	Dave Stanley	Elwyn 003
8	Adelaide	25 October	Roger Martin	PRS

== Points system ==
Points were awarded on a 20-15-12-10-8-6-4-3-2-1 basis for the first ten places at each round.

== Series standings ==
Position	Driver	Car	Entrant	Mal	San	Sur	Ora	Win	Ora	Ama	Ade	Total
1	Warwick Rooklyn	Elwyn 003/004	Formula Ford Race Hire	20	10	12	12	10	-	8	8	80
2	Alan Bisset	Reynard 84FF	Alan Bisset	10	15	10	6	20	8	-	6	75
3=	David Stanley	Elwyn 003	Elwyn Brickley	15	-	-	20	15	-	20	4	74
3=	Roger Martin	Crisp PR5-02 & PRS	Roger Martin & HFC Financial Services	12	12	6	4	2	6	12	20	74
5	David Brabham	Van Diemen RF85	D Brabham	-	-	20	-	4	15	15	15	69
6	Andrew Burden	Lola T642A	Andrew Burden	-	-	8	15	12	20	6	-	61
7	Richard Carter	Matek M1	R Carter	-	-	-	10	-	12	10	12	44
8	Mark Poole	Elfin	Mark Poole	8	4	3	-	8	10	-	-	33
9=	Garry Jones	Reynard & Van Diemen	Garry Jones	2	-	-	8	6	1	4	10	31
9=	Geoff Walters	Elwyn 003	Logan Homes	-	20	-	-	1	4	2	1	28
11=	Ian Thomas	Reynard 84FF	I Thomas	-	-	15	2	-	-	-	-	17
11=	Steve Moody	Totem BM-1	Stephen Moody	4	8	4	1	-	-	-	-	17

- The 1600cc four cylinder Ford Kent engine was mandatory for all cars.
- The above table lists the first twelve placegetters only.
