= 1971 Australian Formula 2 Championship =

The 1971 Australian Formula 2 Championship was a CAMS sanctioned motor racing title for drivers of Australian Formula 2 racing cars. It was the fifth Australian Formula 2 Championship.

The championship was won by Henk Woelders driving an Elfin 600C Waggott.

== Calendar ==
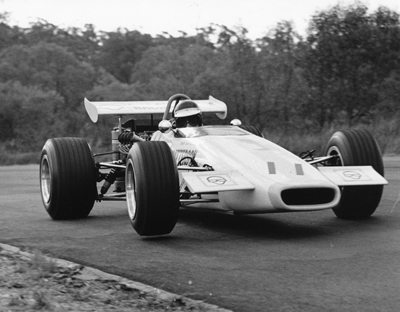
Championship winner Henk Woelders (Elfin 600B) at the Lakeside round

The championship was contested over a six heat series with one race per heat. Heats were staged concurrently with those of the 1971 Australian Drivers' Championship which was open to drivers of both Australian Formula 1 and Australian Formula 2 cars.

Heat	Heat name	Circuit	State	Date	Winning driver	Car
1	Governor's Trophy	Lakeside	Queensland	6 June	Tony Stewart	Elfin 600B England Ford
2	Angus & Coote Diamond Trophy	Oran Park	New South Wales	27 June	Henk Woelders	Elfin 600C Waggott
3	Glynn Scott Memorial Trophy	Surfers Paradise	Queensland	29 August	Henk Woelders	Elfin 600C Waggott
4	Victoria Trophy	Sandown Park	Victoria	12 September	Henk Woelders	Elfin 600C Waggott
5		Symmons Plains	Tasmania	25 September	Tony Stewart	Elfin 600B England Ford
6	Rothmans Trophy	Mallala	South Australia	11 October	Henk Woelders	Elfin 600C Waggott

== Points system ==
Championship points were awarded on a 9–6–4–3–2–1 basis to the first six placegetters in the Formula 2 class at each heat. Each driver could retain points only from his/her best five heat results.

== Results ==
Position	Driver	Car	Entrant	Lak.	Ora.	Sur.	San.	Sym.	Mal.	Total
1	Henk Woelders	Elfin 600C Waggott	Bill Patterson Racing	4	9	9	9	–	9	40
2	Tony Stewart	Elfin 600B England Ford	Paul England Pty Ltd; Box Hill Auto Sales	9	6	2	–	9	6	32
3	Jack Bono	Elfin 600B Lotus Ford	Graham Collier	2	4	4	6	4	–	20
4	John Walker	Elfin 600B Lotus Ford	City State Racing Team	–	3	6	–	–	–	9
5	Ivan Tighe	Elfin 600B	Ivan Tighe	6	–	–	–	–	–	6
=	Garrie Cooper	Elfin 600B Lotus Ford	Elfin Sports Cars	–	–	–	–	6	–	6
7	Vern Hamilton	Elfin 600B	Vern Hamilton	3	2	–	–	–	–	5
8	John Ampt	Elfin Mono 11B Ford	John Ampt	–	–	–	4	–	–	4
9	Ross Ambrose	Elfin 600B Lotus	Ross Ambrose	–	–	3	–	–	–	3
=	Ken Hastings	McLaren M4A Ford	Clive Millis Motors	–	–	–	3	–	–	3
11	Clive Millis	Elfin 600B Ford	Clive Millis Pty Ltd	1	–	–	–	–	–	1
=	Don Uebergang	Elfin 600B	Don Uebergang	–	1	–	–	–	–	1
=	Bob Webb	Ausper	Bob Webb	–	–	1	–	–	–	1

Note:

- Only four Formula 2 cars were classified as finishers at Heat 4
- Only three Formula 2 cars were classified as finishers at Heat 5
- Only two Formula 2 cars were classified as finishers at Heat 6
