= 1977 TAA Formula Ford Driver to Europe Series =

The 1977 TAA Formula Ford Driver to Europe Series was an Australian motor racing competition open to Formula Ford racing cars. The series, which was the eighth national series for Formula Fords to be held in Australia, was won by John Smith driving a Bowin P4a.

== Schedule ==
The series was contested over eight rounds.

Round	Circuit	Date	Round winner	Car	Entrant
1	Oran Park		Richard Carter	Birrana F73	
2	Sandown	February	John Smith	Bowin P4a	Grace Bros Race Team
3	Calder		John Smith	Bowin P4a	Grace Bros Race Team
4	Oran Park		John Smith	Bowin P4a	Grace Bros Race Team
5	Amaroo Park		John Smith	Bowin P4a	Grace Bros Race Team
6	Surfers Paradise	May	John Smith	Bowin P4a	Grace Bros Race Team
7	Amaroo Park	14 August	Lyn Arnel	Lola T440	Grace Bros Race Team
8	Calder	16 October	Andrew Newton	Van Diemen RF77	Andrew Newton

== Results ==
Position	Driver	Car	Entrant	Points
1	John Smith	Bowin P4a	Grace Bros Race Team	115
2	Grant Walker	Titan		69
3	Barry Green	Elfin 620b		51
4	Don Bretland	Elfin 600		42
5	Lyndon Arnel	Lola T442		32
6	Richard Carter	Birrana F73		20
6	Andrew Newton	Van Diemen RF77		20
8	John Tuxford	Bowin P4a		15
8	Wally Storey	Elwyn		15
10	Len Croughan	Elfin 620		12
