= Bowin P8 =

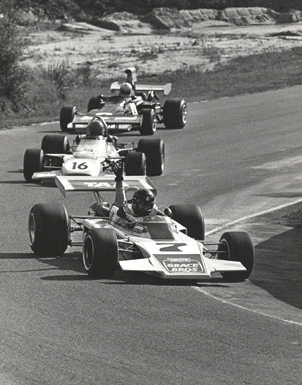
Bowin P8, driven by John Leffler.

The Bowin P8 is a Formula 5000 and Formula 2 racing car, designed and built between 1972 and 1974 by Bowin.

== Specifications ==
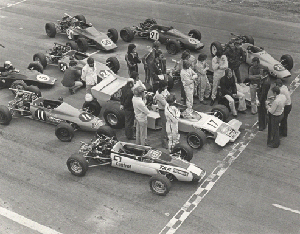
Several Bowin vehicles at the starting line of a track. The P8 is in the center of the first row.

The chassis was a high-rigidity monocoque design of high-strength alloy and steel, utilising the latest assembly techniques, with emphasis placed on ease of maintenance and repair. This supported a body which was a full aerodynamic wedge incorporating side radiators. The cockpit's interior was covered in fully moulded seat and trim sections, making it exceptionally comfortable and roomy.

The rear suspension incorporated twin radius arms, parallel links, Armstrong adjustable dampers, and fully adjustable spherical bearings. The front suspension was a double-wide-based wishbone design with Armstrong adjustable dampers and fully adjustable spherical bearings. The coil spring units for both front and rear were mounted inboard with "Bowin variable rate spring control".

The P8 was steered by a cam-adjustable magnesium rack and pinion designed by Bowin, with an energy-absorbing steering column surmounted by a leather-covered steering wheel. The brakes were Girling 9.75 in (24.8 cm) disc brakes with alloy caliper assemblies. The twin braking system was adjustable for length and had an adjustable-ratio balance control. The rear brakes were mounted inboard on the gearbox to reduce unsprung weight. The wheels were magnesium, with 10 in × 13 in (25 cm × 33 cm) in the front and 12 in × 13 in (30 cm × 33 cm) or 14 in × 13 in (36 cm × 33 cm) in the rear.

It had a wheelbase of 93 in (240 cm), a track of 61 (front) and 63 (rear), and a weight of 800 lb (360 kg) (including the twin cam engine).

The transmission was a Hewland FT2000, providing five speeds and reverse, and it had an alloy adaptor plate. The hydraulic clutch system was complete, including the release mechanism on the gearbox.

The engine was water-cooled by twin, cross-flow, lightweight, side-mounted radiators, with a deaerator control tank and pressure cap. The alloy oil tank was incorporated in the monocoque body and was fitted with antisurge baffles, a deaireator system, alloy pipes, hoses and fittings, and an alloy oil cooler. Fuel was contained in cells in the side panels. Each side had a capacity of 14 US gal (53 L) with a dedicated filter and breather. The P8 was supplied with engine mountings.

The electrical system was powered by a 12-volt, lightweight aircraft battery with a master battery control. It powered a starter solenoid via starter button and switches and an array of instruments, including a tachometer (0–10,000 rpm), oil pressure, water temperature, and oil temperature.

All suspension parts were finished in new Bowin Satin; the others were cadmium-plated and stove-enamelled. The body was painted in the customer's choice of colour.
