= 1981 National Panasonic Series =

The '1981 National Panasonic Series' was an Australian motor racing contest for Formula Pacific and Australian Formula 2 racing cars. It was the inaugural National Panasonic Series.

The series, which was sponsored by National Panasonic, was won by Bruce Allison, driving a Ralt RT4.

== Schedule ==
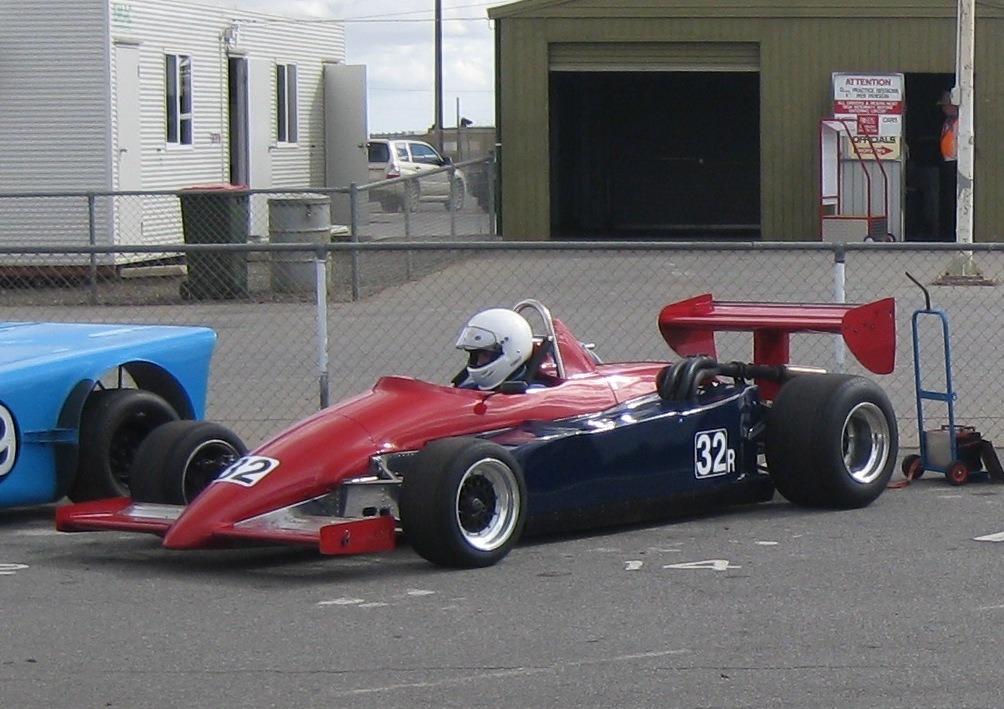
Bruce Allison won the series driving a Ralt RT4 similar to that pictured above

The series was contested over four rounds with two heats per round.

Round	Circuit	State	Date
1	Lakeside	Queensland	19 July
2	Adelaide International Raceway	South Australia	26 July
3	Calder Raceway	Victoria	9 August
4	Oran Park	New South Wales	23 August

== Points system ==
"Points" were allocated on a 20-19-18-17-16-15-14-13-12-11-10-9-8-7-6-5-4-3-2-1 basis for the first 20 places in each heat at each round and then aggregated for each driver to determine the actual round placings. Series points were then awarded, on a 9-6-4-3-2-1 basis, for the first six round placings.

== Series results ==
Position	Driver	No.	Car	Entrant	Points
1	Bruce Allison	62	Ralt RT4	B Allison	20
2	Andrew Miedecke	2	Ralt RT4	A Miedecke	19
3	John Smith	71	Ralt RT1	Ralt Australia	18

The above table lists only the first three placings in the series.
