= 2025 Australian Formula Ford Series =

Motor racing competition

The 2025 Australian Formula Ford Series was a motor racing title for drivers of Formula Ford racing cars. It was the 56th national series for Formula Fords to be held in Australia.

The championship was won by Kobi Williams, who captured the title in the final round at Phillip Island Grand Prix Circuit. Following this season, the category would receive championship status; thus this season would be the final run under the Australian Formula Ford Series moniker.

== Calendar ==
The following circuits hosted a round of the 2025 championship.

Rd	Circuit	Dates	Event	Maps
1	(Victoria (state)) Phillip Island Grand Prix Circuit (Phillip Island, Victoria)	16–18 May	Victorian State Race Series	2025 Australian Formula Ford Series is located in Australia
2	Morgan Park Raceway (Warwick, Queensland)	6–8 June	Queensland State Championships	2025 Australian Formula Ford Series is located in Australia
3	Sydney Motorsport Park (Eastern Creek, New South Wales)	25–26 July	NSW Motor Racing Championships	2025 Australian Formula Ford Series is located in Australia
4	(Victoria (state)) Sandown Raceway (Melbourne, Victoria)	22–24 August	Victorian State Race Series	2025 Australian Formula Ford Series is located in Australia
5	The Bend Motorsport Park (Tailem Bend, South Australia)	19–21 September	South Australian State Championships	2025 Australian Formula Ford Series is located in Australia
6	(Victoria (state)) Phillip Island Grand Prix Circuit (Phillip Island, Victoria)	4–5 October	Victorian State Race Series	2025 Australian Formula Ford Series is located in Australia

== Teams and drivers ==
Entrant	Chassis	No	Driver	Rounds
CoolDrive Auto Parts	Mygale SJ12	3	(Australia) Jarrod Hurst	1, 4, 6
MVA Racing	Spectrum 015	5	(Australia) Joe Imbrogno	1–5
	Spectrum 014	11	(Australia) Fraser Hie	1
Kettle/Zena Sport	Spectrum	14	(Australia) Jack Johnson	1, 4, 6
Anglo Australian Motorsport	Spirit WL06	15	(Australia) Lachlan Mineeff	1–4
Anglo Australian Motorsport	Spirit WL11	76	(Australia) Ashton Gealy	All
Versa	Spectrum 011b	16	(Australia) Hunter Salvatore	1–2
Joe Fawcett Motorsport	Spectrum 015	23	(Australia) Joe Fawcett	All
Tickford Racing	Mygale SJ18a	24	(Australia) Seth Burchartz	1, 4, 6
	Mygale SJ11a	25	(Australia) Nicolas Mendez	1
BJ Workwear/Hard Yakka	Spectrum 015	36	(Australia) Isaac Demellweek	3–5
Kinetic Motorsport	Mygale SJ10a	42	(Australia) Carly Fleming	1
Kaleb Belak Racing	Spectrum 014	43	(Australia) Kaleb Belak	1, 3, 5–6
	Mygale SJ09	44	(Australia) Jack Pennacchia	1, 4
Marcos Ambrose Motorsport	Spectrum 015	45	(Australia) Tabitha Ambrose	1, 3–6
Marcos Ambrose Motorsport	Spectrum 012	61	(Australia) Brad James	1, 3–4, 6
Fabcon	Spectrum 015	48	(Australia) Jamie Rowe	All
William Lowing Motorpsort	Mygale SJ10	53	(Australia) William Lowing	1, 3–4
BF Racing	Spectrum 011	55	(Australia) Andrew Torti	5
BF Racing	Spectrum 015	86	(New Zealand) Toby McCormack	1–2
BF Racing	Mygale SJ12a	88	(Australia) Lachlan Evennett	1–2, 4–6
Jacal Racing	Van Diemen RF06	80	(Australia) Jason Liddell	3
	Van Diemen RF90	90	(Australia) Craig Arnold	4
Borland Racing Developments	Spectrum 012b	94	(Australia) Kobi Williams	All

== Results and standings ==
=== Results ===
Rd	Race	Circuit	Pole position	Fastest lap	Winning driver	Winning team
1	1	(Victoria (state)) Phillip Island Grand Prix Circuit	(Australia) Kobi Williams	(Australia) Joe Fawcett	(Australia) Kobi Williams	Borland Racing Developments
1	2	(Victoria (state)) Phillip Island Grand Prix Circuit		race cancelled		
1	3	(Victoria (state)) Phillip Island Grand Prix Circuit		(Australia) Kobi Williams	(Australia) Joe Fawcett	Joe Fawcett Motorsport
2	1	(Queensland) Morgan Park Raceway	(Australia) Kobi Williams	(Australia) Kobi Williams	(Australia) Kobi Williams	Borland Racing Developments
2	2	(Queensland) Morgan Park Raceway		(Australia) Kobi Williams	(Australia) Kobi Williams	Borland Racing Developments
2	3	(Queensland) Morgan Park Raceway		(Australia) Kobi Williams	(Australia) Lachlan Evennett	BF Racing
3	1	(New South Wales) Sydney Motorsport Park	(Australia) Kobi Williams	(Australia) William Lowing	(Australia) Joe Fawcett	Joe Fawcett Motorsport
3	2	(New South Wales) Sydney Motorsport Park		(Australia) Joe Fawcett	(Australia) Joe Fawcett	Joe Fawcett Motorsport
3	3	(New South Wales) Sydney Motorsport Park		(Australia) Joe Fawcett	(Australia) William Lowing	William Lowing Motorsport
4	1	(Victoria (state)) Sandown Raceway	(Australia) Lachlan Evennett	(Australia) William Lowing	(Australia) Lachlan Evennett	BF Racing
4	2	(Victoria (state)) Sandown Raceway		(Australia) William Lowing	(Australia) Kobi Williams	Borland Racing Developments
4	3	(Victoria (state)) Sandown Raceway		(Australia) Kobi Williams	(Australia) Lachlan Evennett	BF Racing
5	1	(South Australia) The Bend Motorsport Park	(Australia) Kobi Williams	(Australia) Kobi Williams	(Australia) Kobi Williams	Borland Racing Developments
5	2	(South Australia) The Bend Motorsport Park		(Australia) Lachlan Evennett	(Australia) Lachlan Evennett	BF Racing
5	3	(South Australia) The Bend Motorsport Park		(Australia) Kobi Williams	(Australia) Kobi Williams	Borland Racing Developments
6	1	(Victoria (state)) Phillip Island Grand Prix Circuit	(Australia) Kobi Williams	(Australia) Lachlan Evennett	(Australia) Kobi Williams	Borland Racing Developments
6	2	(Victoria (state)) Phillip Island Grand Prix Circuit		(Australia) Kobi Williams	(Australia) Kobi Williams	Borland Racing Developments
6	3	(Victoria (state)) Phillip Island Grand Prix Circuit		(Australia) Kobi Williams	(Australia) Kobi Williams	Borland Racing Developments

=== Championship standings ===
Pos.	Driver	(Victoria (state)) PHI1			(Queensland) MOR			(New South Wales) SYD			(Victoria (state)) SAN			(South Australia) BEN			(Victoria (state)) PHI2			Pts
Pos.	Driver	R1	R2	R3	R1	R2	R3	R1	R2	R3	R1	R2	R3	R1	R2	R3	R1	R2	R3	Pts
1	(Australia) Kobi Williams	1	C	2	1	1	3	10	7	2	2	1	2	1	Ret	1	1	1	1	287
2	(Australia) Joe Fawcett	2	C	1	2	2	2	1	1	3	4	4	3	4	2	3	3	3	5	259
3	(Australia) Lachlan Evennett	3	C	3	3	3	1				1	2	1	2	1	2	2	2	2	233
4	(Australia) Jamie Rowe	Ret	C	9	5	4	8	3	4	4	3	3	5	3	6	5	4	4	3	189
5	(Australia) Tabitha Ambrose	17	C	18				7	9	7	9	13	10	8	7	6	8	10	Ret	122
=	(Australia) Ashton Gealy	16	C	17	8	8	9	11	8	9	7	12	11	DSQ	8	Ret	Ret	11	9	122
7	(Australia) Giuseppe Imbrogno	12	C	11	6	5	4	6	Ret	Ret	Ret	8	Ret	6	4	7				114
8	(Australia) Lachlan Mineeff	7	C	10	4	6	6	4	3	Ret	Ret	9	Ret							99
9	(Australia) Seth Burchartz	4	C	4							Ret	Ret	DNS				5	5	4	59
10	(Australia) Hunter Salvatore	5	C	6	Ret	9	7													38
=	(New Zealand) Toby McCormack	8	C	Ret	7	7	5													38
12	(Australia) Brad James	10	C	7				5	5	6	Ret	11	8				6	7	6	36
13	(Australia) Fraser Hie	9	C	15																15
guest drivers ineligible for points
-	(Australia) William Lowing	6	C	5				2	2	1	5	5	4							0
-	(Australia) Jack Johnson	11	C	8							Ret	10	7				Ret	8	8	0
-	(Australia) Isaac Demellweek							8	10	8	6	6	6	5	3	4				0
-	(Australia) Kaleb Balek	13	C	16				9	6	5				7	5	8	9	6	Ret	0
-	(Australia) Jason Liddell							12	11	10										0
-	(Australia) Nicolas Mendez	14	C	12																0
-	(Australia) Jarrod Hurst	15	C	14							8	7	9				7	9	7	0
-	(Australia) Carly Fleming	18	C	19																0
-	(Australia) Andrew Torti													9	9	9				0
-	(Australia) Jack Pennacchia										Ret	DNS	DNS							0
Pos.	Driver	R1	R2	R3	R1	R2	R3	R1	R2	R3	R1	R2	R3	R1	R2	R3	R1	R2	R3	Pts
Pos.	Driver	(Victoria (state)) PHI1			(Queensland) MOR			(New South Wales) SYD			(Victoria (state)) SAN			(South Australia) BEN			(Victoria (state)) PHI2			Pts
