= Bowin Cars =

Bowin Car Logo

Bowin Cars was an Australian designer and manufacturer of motor racing cars from 1968 to 1976. The company was founded by John Vincent Joyce (1938–2002), a successful designer and builder of racing cars and in later years gas appliances incorporating Low NOx Technology.

== History ==
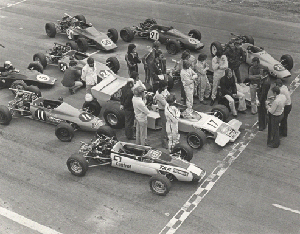
A collection of Bowin vehicles. The model in the foreground is a P4, number 17 is a P8 and the car a top left of the photo is a P6.

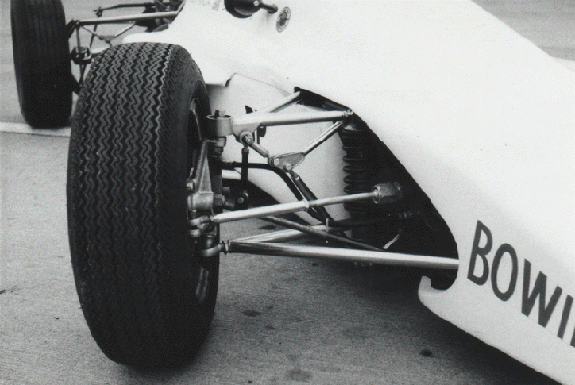
A close up of the Bowin P6 suspension

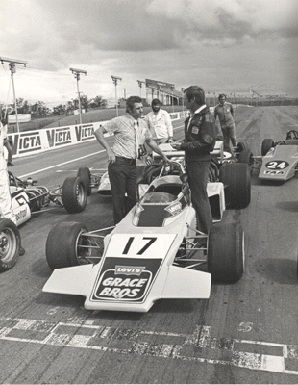
Bowin founder John Joyce talking to champion Australian racing driver John Leffler

Approximately ten racing cars were sold for export to Canada, New Zealand and South East Asia. Bowin Cars have raced successfully in these countries as well as Europe.

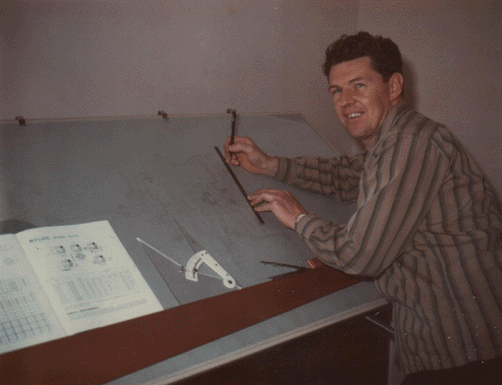
John Joyce designing his next racing car. Taken in the early 1970s

== Models ==
All Bowin Cars started with the letter P, which simply stood for project.

=== Earlier Models ===
In fact, two Formula Juniors were designed and built by John Joyce prior to the formation of Bowin Cars.

- (P1) - A Cooper-based car in 1959
- (P2) - The Koala in 1962.

=== Bowin Models ===
- Bowin P3 - 1967-1968 P3 Australian National Formula Car
- Bowin P4 - 1970-1974 P4 Formula Ford Car
- Bowin P6 - 1972-1974 P6 Formula Ford & Formula 2 Car
- Bowin P7 - 1973-1975 P7 ?
- Bowin P8 - 1973-1975 P8 Formula 2 & Formula 5000 Car
