= Elfin Type 600 =

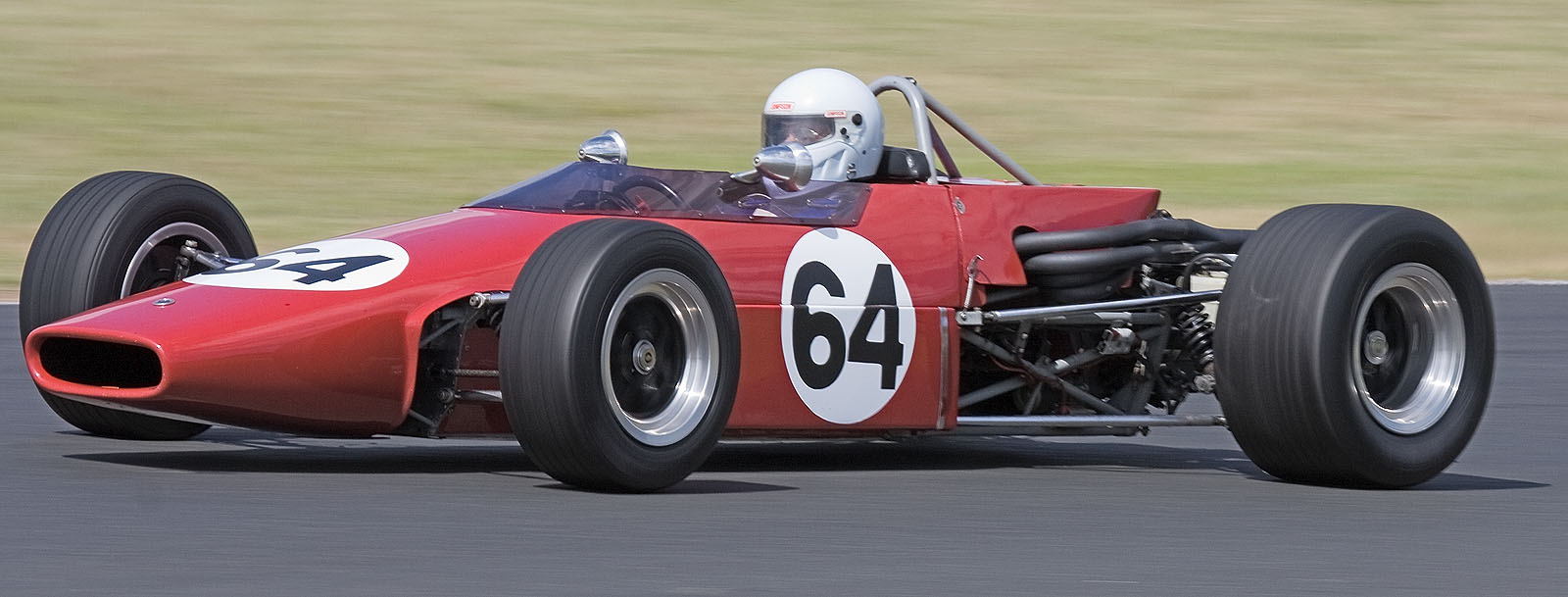

Overview
- Manufacturer: Elfin Sports Cars
- Production: 1968-1971; 1969-1972 (600 FF)
- Designer: Garrie Cooper

Body and chassis
- Class: Australian 1½ Litre Formula; Australian Formula 2 Australian National Formula; Australian Formula 1 Australian Formula 3 Formula Ford

Chronology
- Predecessor: Elfin Type 100 Mono
- Successor: Elfin 622

The Elfin Type 600 is a Formula car produced from 1968 to 1971 by Elfin Sports Cars in Australia. The model was originally developed to compete in the Australian 1½ Litre Formula but later variants were also produced for other categories including Australian Formula 2, the Australian National Formula, Australian Formula 1, Australian Formula 3 and Formula Ford.

The model has won numerous major titles including the 1968 Australian 1½ Litre Championship, 1971 Australian Formula 2 Championship, 1972 Australian Formula 2 Championship, the 1970 and 1971 Australian Formula Ford Series, the 1970 and 1971 New Zealand Formula Ford Championships, the 1968 Singapore Grand Prix, the 1968 and 1969 Malaysian Grand Prix and the 1983 Australian Hillclimb Championship.

The car cost $6500 when it was new.

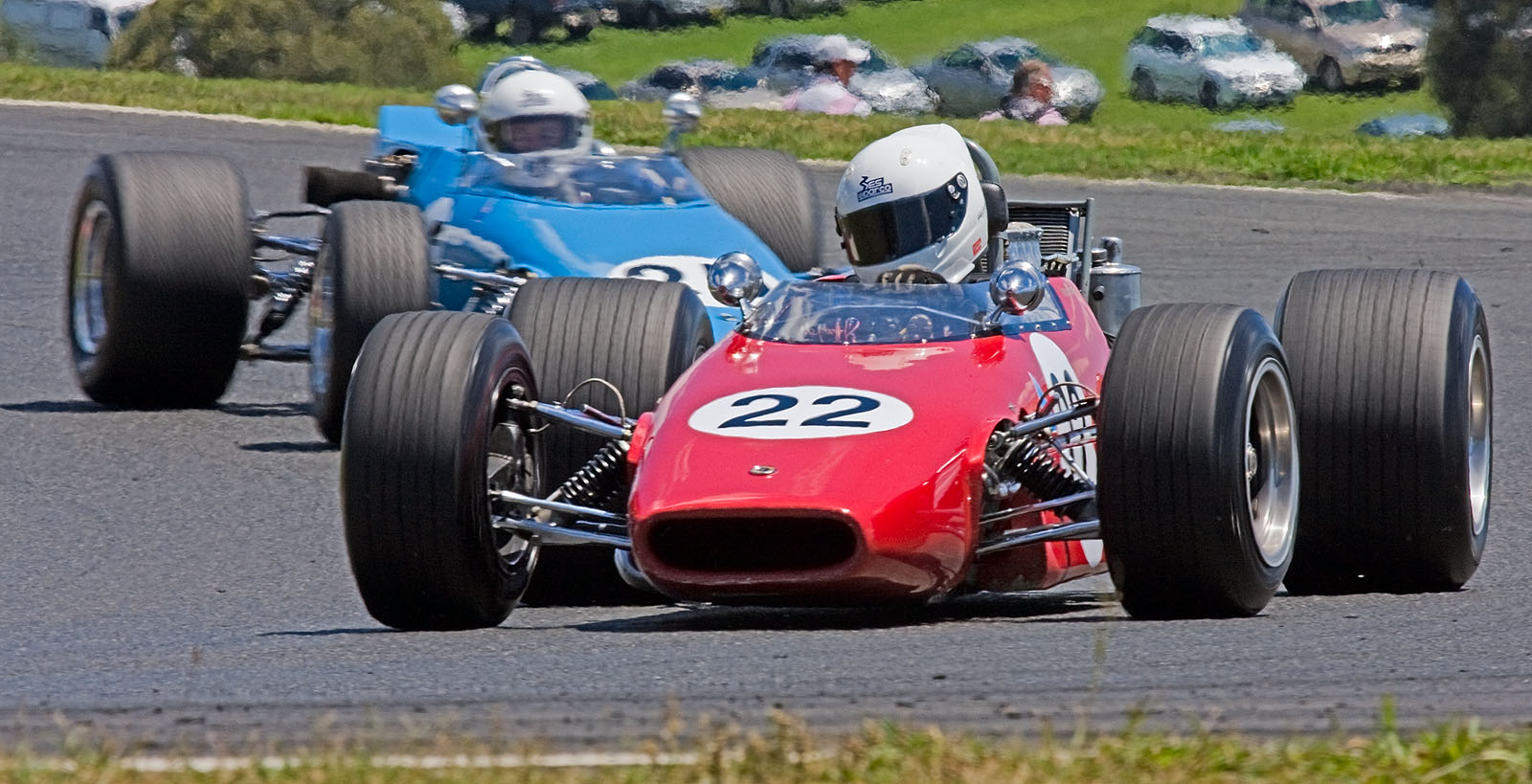
Elfin 600 C

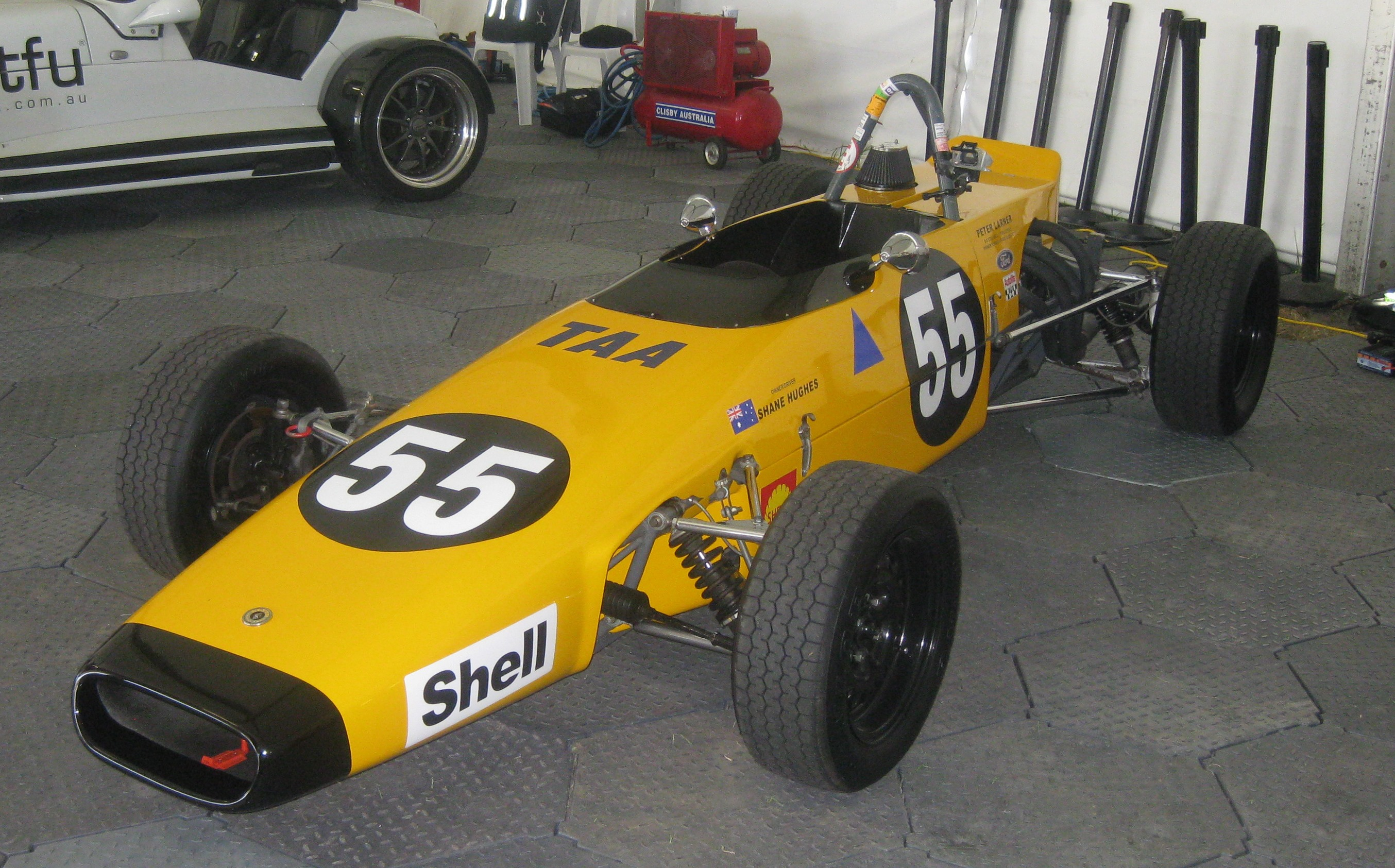
Elfin 600 FF

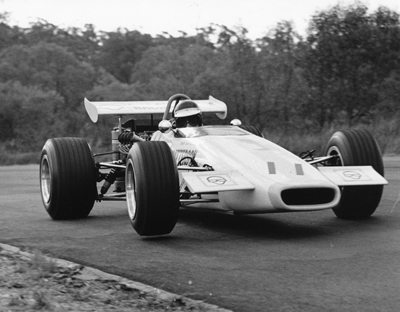
Elfin 600 E
