= Bowin P4 =

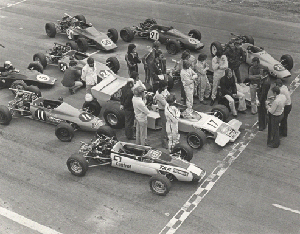
Bowin P4 (foreground)

The Bowin P4 is a Formula Ford race car designed and built in Australia in the 1970s by Bowin. Drivers of Bowin P4s won the TAA Formula Ford Driver to Europe Series in 1972, 1977 and 1978. Many of the cars still race today in the Historic Formula Ford category.
