= Hume Weir Motor Racing Circuit =

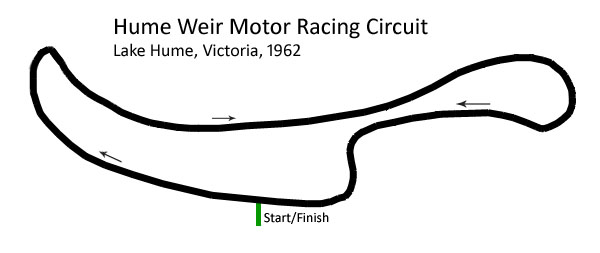
- Location: Lake Hume, Victoria
- Coordinates: 36°06′50″S 147°00′50″E
- Opened: 2 November 1959
- Closed: 27 March 1977
- Major events: Australian Formula 2 Championship; Australian Sports Car Championship

1960-77 circuit
- Length: 1.6 km (0.99 mi)
- Race lap record: 42.7 (Alfredo Costanzo, Birrana 274 Ford, 1975)

1959-60 circuit
- Length: 1.29 km (0.80 mi)

The Hume Weir Motor Racing Circuit is a now disused motorsport track built on the Victorian side of the Murray River at Lake Hume near Albury-Wodonga in Australia.

== History ==
The circuit was built in a disused quarry left over from the construction of the Hume Weir, which had taken place between 1919 and 1931.The track was used for both motorcycle and car racing.

The opening race meeting was held on 2 November 1959. Originally 1.28 km in length, the track was extended to 1.6 km in 1960 and was sealed in the same year.

The final meeting was staged on 27 March 1977. The lap record, set by Alfredo Costanzo driving a Birrana, stands at 42.7 seconds. It was established during the third round of the 1975 Australian Formula 2 Championship on 15 June 1975.

=== Alpine Rally ===
After the final race meeting in 1977, the circuit continued to be used for stages of the Alpine Rally during the 1980s and possibly the early 1990s.

== Today ==
The circuit has been in a state of disrepair for many years. Further damage was caused to the circuit in the mid-2000s by construction work on the nearby dam wall which had been undertaken due to concern that the wall may be moving.

== Major races ==
Race	Date	Winning driver	Car
1973 Australian Formula 2 Championship (Round 1)	3 June	Leo Geoghegan	Birrana 272 Ford
1974 Australian Formula 2 Championship (Round 1)	16 June	Leo Geoghegan	Birrana 274 Ford
1975 Australian Formula 2 Championship (Round 3)	15 June	Alfredo Costanzo	Birrana 274 Ford
1976 Australian Formula 2 Championship (Round 2)	13 June	Peter Larner	Elfin 700
1976 Australian Sports Car Championship (Round 4)	26 September	Alan Hamilton	Porsche Turbo
