= 1973 Australian Formula 2 Championship =

The 1973 Australian Formula 2 Championship was an Australian motor racing competition for Australian Formula 2 cars. It was sanctioned by the Confederation of Australian Motor Sport (CAMS) as an Australian National Title and was the seventh Australian Formula 2 Championship to be awarded by CAMS.

The championship was dominated by multiple-championship winning driver Leo Geoghegan, who scored a perfect 54 points from six round wins over the course of the season.

== Calendar ==
The championship was contested over a seven-round series with one race per round.

Round	Circuit	State	Date
1	Hume Weir	Victoria	3 June
2	Oran Park	New South Wales	5 August
3	Amaroo Park	New South Wales	19 August
4	Surfers Paradise	Queensland	2 September
5	Symmons Plains	Tasmania	23 September
6	Adelaide International Raceway	South Australia	7 October
7	Calder	Victoria	21 October

== Points system ==
Championship points were awarded on a 9-6-4-3-2-1 basis to the first six eligible finishers at each round. Only holders of a General Competition License issued by CAMS were eligible for points and each driver could retain points only from his/her best six round results.

== Results ==
Position	Driver	Car	Entrant	Hum.	Ora.	Ama.	Sur.	Sym.	Ade.	Cal.	Total
1	Leo Geoghegan	Birrana 272 Ford; Birrana 273 Ford	Grace Bros. Racing Team	9	9	9	9	9	(6)	9	54
2	Enno Busselmann	Birrana 273 Ford	Bob and Marj Brown	-	-	-	4	1	9	6	20
3	Bob Skelton	Bowin P6 Ford	Finnie Ford Miranda	-	4	6	1	6	-	-	17
4	Chris Farrell	Dolphin 732 Ford	Chris Farrell	-	1	3	3	3	4	-	14
5	Bruce Allison	Bowin P6 Ford	Hobby & Toyland Racing	-	-	-	6	4	-	-	10
=	Ray Winter	Mildren Mono Ford	Ray Winter	-	2	4	-	-	-	4	10
7	Tony Stewart	Birrana 273 Ford	5AD/City State Racing Team	6	3	-	-	-	-	-	9
8	Peter Brock	Birrana 273 Ford	Peter Brock	-	6	1	-	-	-	-	7
9	Chas Talbot	Elfin 600E Waggott	Chas Talbot	4	-	-	-	-	-	-	4
=	Bob Johns	Lotus 59 Ford	Bob Johns	2	-	-	2	-	-	-	4
=	Ian Fergusson	Bowin P3a Ford	Ian Fergusson	-	-	2	-	2	-	-	4
12	Bob Holden	Brabham BT36 Ford	Bob Holden	3	-	-	-	-	-	-	3
=	Paul Hamilton	Elfin 600 Ford	Paul Hamilton	-	-	-	-	-	-	3	3
14	Mike Stillwell	Elfin 622 Ford	B. S. Stillwell Ford	1	-	-	-	-	-	-	1
