= 1975 Australian Formula 2 Championship =

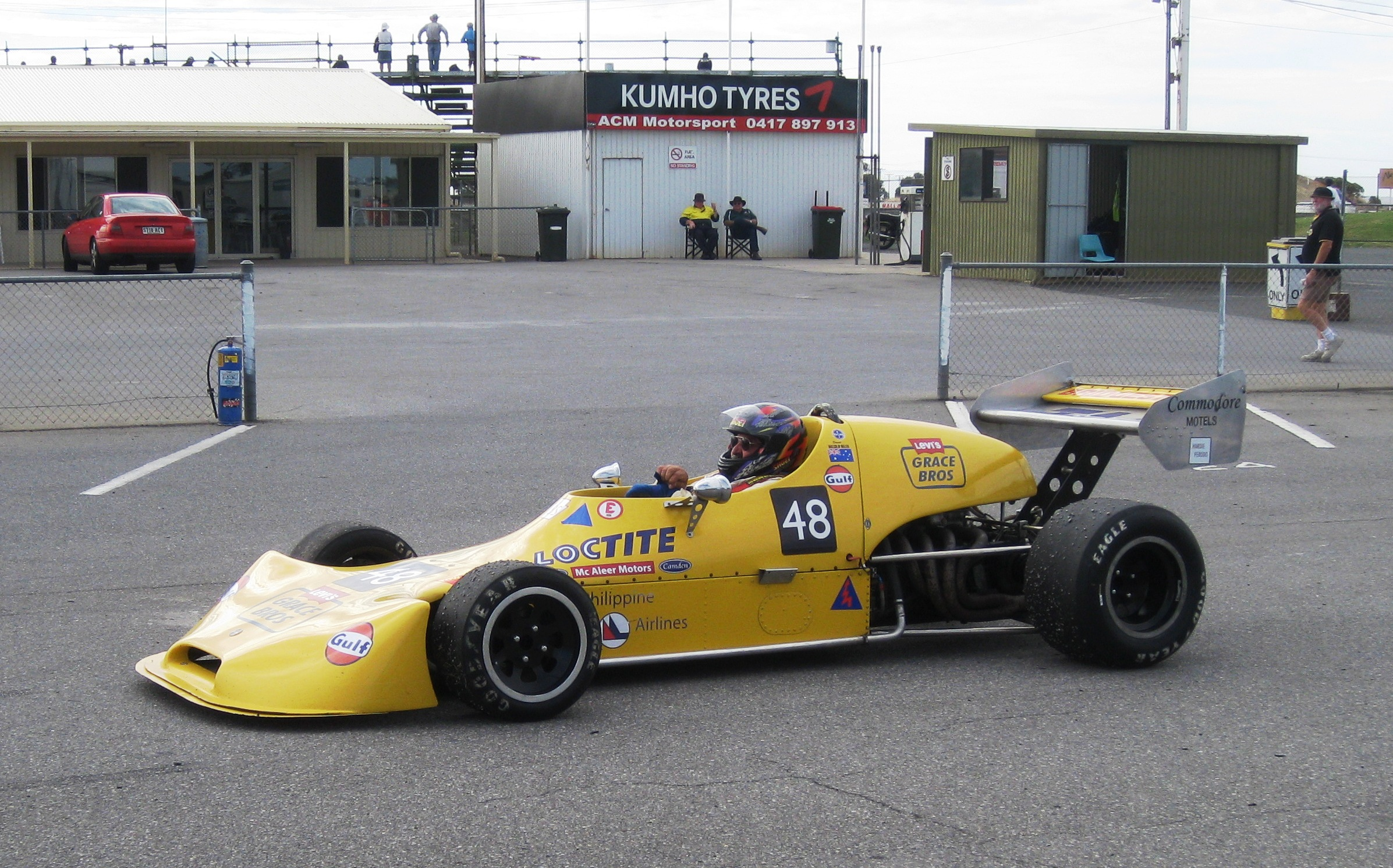
Geoff Brabham won the 1975 Australian Formula 2 Championship in a Grace Bros sponsored Birrana 274, similar to that pictured above.

The 1975 Australian Formula 2 Championship was a CAMS sanctioned Australian motor racing title open to Racing Cars complying with Australian Formula 2 regulations. It was the ninth Australian Formula 2 Championship to be awarded by CAMS. The championship was won by Geoff Brabham, driving a Birrana 274 Ford.

== Calendar ==
The championship was contested over a seven round series with one race per round.

Round	Name	Circuit	State	Date	Winner	Car
1		Calder	Victoria	25 May	Andrew Miedecke	Rennmax BN7 Ford
2		Amaroo Park	New South Wales	1 June	Geoff Brabham	Birrana 274 Ford
3		Hume Weir	Victoria	15 June	Alfredo Costanzo	Birrana 274 Ford
4		Sandown	Victoria	5 July	Ken Shirvington	March 732 Ford
5		Calder	Victoria	10 August	Alfredo Costanzo	Birrana 274 Ford
6		Symmons Plains	Tasmania	28 September	Geoff Brabham	Birrana 274 Ford
7	Rothmans Trophy	Phillip island	Victoria	30 November	Geoff Brabham	Birrana 274 Ford

== Points system ==
Championship points were awarded on a 9-6-4-3-2-1 basis to the first six place-getters at each round.

== Results ==
Position	Driver	No.	Car	Entrant	Cal.	Ama.	Hum.	San.	Cal.	Sym.	Phi.	Total.
1	Geoff Brabham	10	Birrana 274 Ford	Grace Bros-Levi's Racing Team	6	9	6	-	-	9	9	39
2	Alfredo Costanzo	5	Birrana 274 Ford	Alfredo Costanzo	-	-	9	-	9	2	4	24
3	Andrew Miedecke	2	Rennmax BN7 Ford	Grace Bros-Levi's Racing Team	9	-	3	-	-	4	6	22
4	Ken Shirvington	3	March 732 Ford	Ken Shirvington	3	-	1	-	6	6	-	16
5	Ray Winter	27	Mildren Ford	Ray Winter	4	4	-	-	-	1	-	9
6	Chris Farrell	6	Elfin 622 Ford	Chris Farrell	-	3	-	-	2	3	-	8
7	John Macdonald		Brabham BT41 Ford		-	6	-	-	-	-	-	6
=	Tony Stewart	21	Brabham BT36 Ford	Tony Stewart	2	-	4	-	-	-	-	6
9	Chas Talbot	12	Birrana 274 Ford	Chas. Talbot	-	-	2	-	3	-	-	5
10	John Leffler		Brabham BT36 Ford		-	-	-	-	4	-	-	4
11	Enno Busselmann		Elfin 622 Ford	Enno Busselmann	-	-	-	-	-	-	3	3
12	Tony Maw		Elfin 700 Ford	Helena Rubinstein Racing Team	-	2	-	-	-	-	-	2
=	Graeme Crawford		Biranna 273 Ford	Graeme Crawford	-	-	-	-	-	-	2	2
14	Rob Butcher		Asp 330 Toyota	Rob Butcher	1	-	-	-	-	-	-	1
=	Wolfgang Prejawa	26	Birrana 274 Ford	Wolfgang Prejawa	-	1	-	-	-	-	-	1
=	Peter Warren		Birrana 273 Ford		-	-	-	-	1	-	-	1
=	Doug MacArthur		Lola T360 Ford	Doug MacArthur	-	-	-	-	-	-	1	1

- Note: No points were awarded at the Sandown round as the race was stopped early due to heavy rain.
