= 1974 Australian Formula 2 Championship =

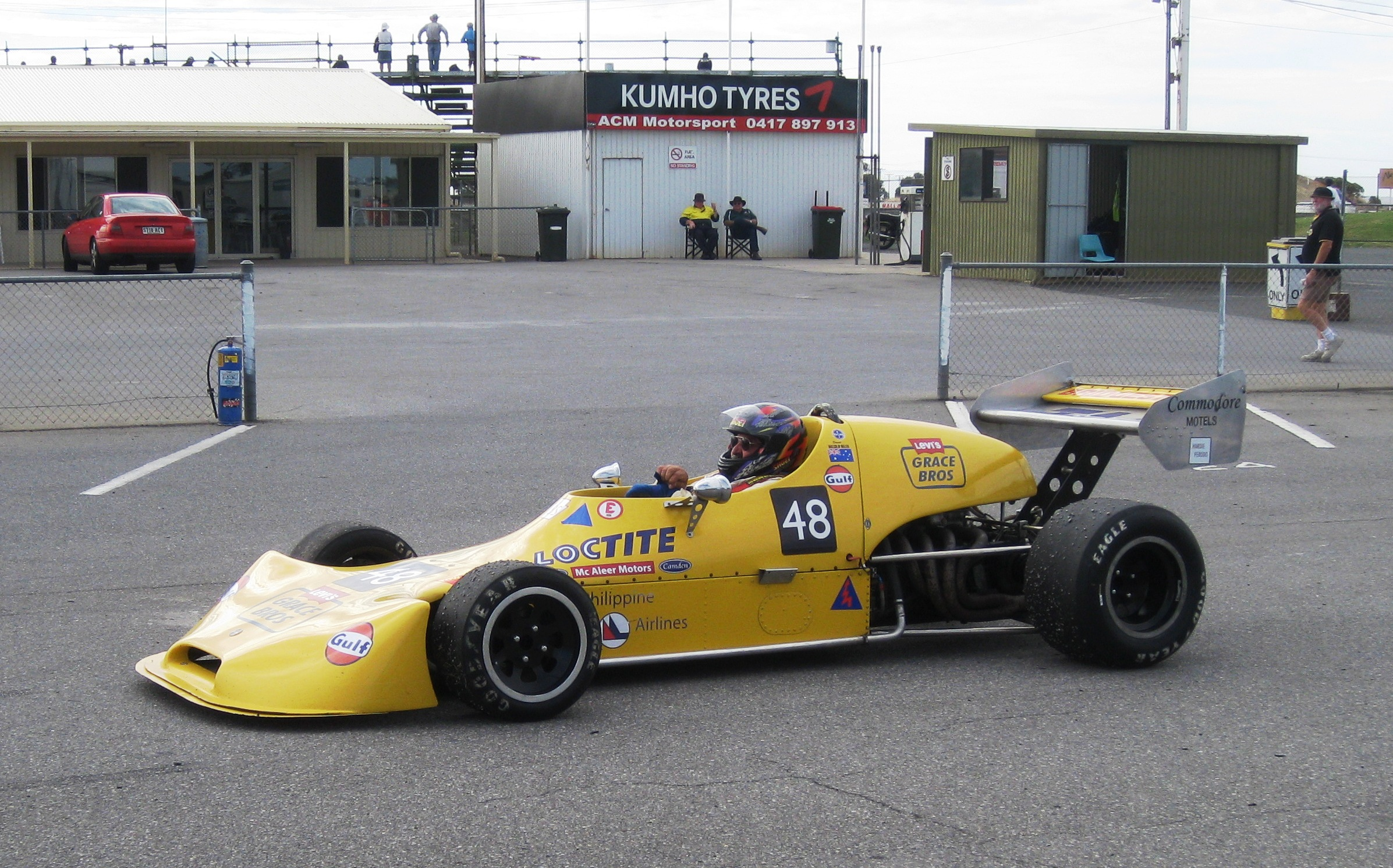
Leo Geoghegan won the championship in this Birrana 274. The car is pictured in 2010.

The 1974 Australian Formula 2 Championship was an Australian motor racing competition for Australian Formula 2 racing cars. It was authorised by the Confederation of Australian Motor Sport (CAMS) as an Australian National Title and was the eighth Australian Formula 2 Championship to be awarded by CAMS. The championship was sponsored by Melbourne shirt-maker Van Heusen, which provided $50,000 prizemoney for the eight round series.

The championship was won by Leo Geoghegan driving a Birrana 274 Ford for the Grace Bros. Levis Racing Team.

== Calendar ==
The championship was contested over an eight round series with one race per round.

| Round | Circuit | State | Date | Winning driver | Car |
| 1 | Hume Weir | Victoria | 16 June | Leo Geoghegan | Birrana 274 Ford |
| 2 | Oran Park | New South Wales | 23 June | Leo Geoghegan | Birrana 274 Ford |
| 3 | Amaroo Park Raceway | New South Wales | 21 July | Bob Muir | Birrana 273 Ford |
| 4 | Calder | Victoria | 18 August | Leo Geoghegan | Birrana 274 Ford |
| 5 | Symmons Plains | Tasmania | 22 September | Bob Muir | Birrana 273 Ford |
| 6 | Phillip Island | Victoria | 13 October | John Leffler | Bowin P8 Ford |
| 7 | Adelaide International Raceway | South Australia | 27 October | Bob Muir | Birrana 273 Ford |
| 8 | Lakeside | Queensland | 8 December | Ray Winter | Mildren Mono Ford |

== Points system ==
Championship points were awarded on a 9-6-4-3-2-1 basis to the first six eligible finishers at each round. Only holders of a General Competition License issued by CAMS were eligible for points and each driver could retain points only from his/her best seven round results.

== Championship standings ==
| Position | Driver | No. | Car | Entrant | Hum | Ora | Ama | Cal | Sym | Phi | Ade | Lak | Total |
|---|---|---|---|---|---|---|---|---|---|---|---|---|---|
| 1 | Leo Geoghegan | 1 | Birrana 274 Ford | Grace Bros. Levis Racing Team | 9 | 9 | 6 | 9 | - | 2 | - | 6 | 41 |
| 2 | Bob Muir | 6; 18 & 3 | Rennmax BN6 Ford; Birrana 273 Ford | Bob & Marj Brown | - | 4 | 9 | 6 | 9 | - | 9 | - | 37 |
| 3 | John Leffler | 7 | Bowin P8 Ford | Grace Bros. Levis Racing Team | - | 2 | 4 | 4 | - | 9 | 6 | - | 25 |
| 4 | Ray Winter | 27 | Mildren Mono Ford | Ray Winter | - | - | 3 | 2 | 6 | - | 4 | 9 | 24 |
| 5 | Bruce Allison | 62 | Birrana 274 Ford | Hobby & Toyland Racing | 1 | - | - | 3 | - | 4 | - | 4 | 12 |
| 6 | Graeme Crawford | 66 | Birrana 273 Ford | Graeme Crawford | 2 | - | - | - | 4 | 3 | 2 | - | 11 |
| 7 | Johnnie Walker | 2 | Elfin 622 Ford | John Walker Motor Racing | 4 | 6 | - | - | - | - | - | - | 10 |
| 8 | Wolfgang Prejawa | 26 | Birrana 274 Ford | Wolfgang Prejawa | - | - | - | - | - | 6 | - | 2 | 8 |
| 9 | Enno Buesselmann | 18 | Birrana 273 Ford | Bob & Marj Brown | 6 | - | - | - | - | - | - | - | 6 |
| 9 | Tony Stewart | 21 | Brabham BT36 Ford | Tony Stewart Wholesale Cars | 3 | 1 | 2 | - | - | - | - | - | 6 |
| 11 | Ken Shirvington | 21 | March 732 Ford | Ken Shirvington | - | - | - | - | - | - | 3 | 1 | 4 |
| 12 | Max Stewart | 6 | March 722 Ford | Max Stewart Motors | - | 3 | - | - | - | - | - | - | 3 |
| 12 | Chris Farrell | 36 | Elfin 600B Ford | Chris Farrell | - | - | - | - | 3 | - | - | - | 3 |
| 12 | Ian Douglass | 77 | March 733M/743 Ford | Ian Douglass | - | - | - | - | - | - | - | 3 | 3 |
| 15 | Craig McAllister | 10 | Elfin 622 Ford | Oxford Spares | - | - | - | - | - | 1 | 1 | - | 2 |
| 16 | Paul Hamilton | 88 | Elfin 600 Ford | Paul Hamilton | - | - | 1 | - | - | - | - | - | 1 |
| 16 | Mike Stillwell | 6 | Elfin 622 Ford | B.S. Stillwell Ford | - | - | - | 1 | - | - | - | - | 1 |

Note:

- New Zealander Ken Smith (March 712M/732 Ford) finished 4th at Hume Weir and 6th at Amaroo Park but was not eligible for points.
- Malaysian driver Sonny Rajah (March 732 Ford) finished 6th at Hume Weir and 3rd at Symmons Plains but was not eligible for points.
- There were only four eligible finishers at the Symmons Plains round.
