= 1976 Australian Formula 2 Championship =

The 1976 Australian Formula 2 Championship was a CAMS sanctioned motor racing title for drivers of Australian Formula 2 racing cars. The title was contested over a four round series:

- Round 1, Calder, Victoria, 23 May
- Round 2, Hume Weir, New South Wales, 13 June
- Round 3, Oran Park, New South Wales, 1 August
- Round 4, Phillip Island, Victoria, 21 November

Championship points were awarded on a 9-6-4-3-2-1 basis to the top six placegetters at each round.

== Results ==
Position	Driver	No.	Car	Entrant	R1	R2	R3	R4	Total
1	Graeme Crawford	66	Birrana 273 Ford		9	6	2	6	23
2	Peter Larner		Elfin 700		-	9	6	3	18
3	Chris Farrell	36	Elfin 622		4	4	3	-	11
4	Andrew Miedecke	2	Rennmax BN7	Grace Bros	-	-	9	-	9
4	Enno Busselmann		Elfin 622		-	-	-	9	9
6	Wolfgang Prejawa		Birrana 274		-	3	-	4	7
7	Chas Talbot		Birrana 274 England		6	-	-	-	6
8	Doug MacArthur		Lola T360		3	1	1	-	5
9	Clive Millis	7	Elfin 630		-	-	4	-	4
10	Michael Stack		Cheetah		2	-	-	-	2
10	Ian Fergusson		Bowin P6		-	2	-	-	2
10	Ray Hanger		Dolphin		-	-	-	2	2
13	Werner Bekker		Elfin 620		1	-	-	-	1
13	Graeme Smith		Birrana 274		-	-	-	1	1
