= 1987 Australian Formula 2 Championship =

The 1987 Australian Formula 2 Championship was a CAMS sanctioned motor racing title for drivers of Australian Formula 2 racing cars. It was the 20th Australian Formula 2 Championship.

The championship was won by Arthur Abrahams driving a modified version of a Cheetah Mk.8 after championship leader Mark McLaughlin (Elfin 852) collided with third placed driver Graeme Smith (Cheetah Mk.7) in the warm-up of the final race of the season. Abrahams only win was at the final race compared to McLaughlin's three. The other race wins were taken by Cheetah driver Derek Pingel and Ralt RT30 driver David Brabham. Abrahams won the championship by 20 points. Smith stayed third, 41 points behind McLaughlin and just four points ahead of Pingel. Magnum driver Neil Israel was a further three points behind.

== Calendar ==
The championship was contested over a six-round series with one race per round.

- Round 1, Symmons Plains, Tasmania, 8 March
- Round 2, Lakeside, Queensland, 5 April
- Round 3, Adelaide International Raceway, South Australia, 3 May
- Round 4, Amaroo Park, New South Wales, 21 June
- Round 5, Mallala Motor Sport Park, South Australia, 9 August
- Round 6, Sandown Park, Victoria, 13 September .

== Points system ==
Championship points were awarded on a 30–27–24–21–19–17–15–14–13–12–11–10–9–8–7–6–5–4–3–2 basis to the first 20 finishers in each round.

== Results ==
Position	Driver	No.	Car	Entrant	R1	R2	R3	R4	R5	R6	Total
1	Arthur Abrahams	19	Cheetah Mk.8 Volkswagen	Arthur Abrahams	6th	2nd	3rd	2nd	2nd	1st	152
2	Mark McLaughlin	9	Elfin 852 Volkswagen	Elfin Sports Cars Pty Ltd	1st	1st	4th	4th	1st	DNS	132
3	Graeme Smith	27	Cheetah Mk.7 Volkswagen	Graeme Smith	5th	5th	9th	5th	4th	Ret	91
4	Derek Pingel	5	Cheetah Mk.8 Volkswagen	Derek Pingle	Ret	3rd	1st	3rd	Ret	13th	87
5	Neil Israel	44	Magnum 863 Volkswagen	Magnum Racing Australia	4th	4th	7th	Ret		2nd	84
6	Jon Crooke	1	Cheetah Mk.8 Volkswagen	Michael Borland	2nd	Ret	2nd	9th			67
7	Ian Caldwell	6	Cheetah Mk.6 Toyota	Ian Caldwell		10th	15th	10th	9th	10th	56
8	Rohan Onslow	1	Cheetah Mk.8 Volkswagen	Michael Borland					3rd	5th	43
8	Grahame Blee	2	Cheetah Mk.6 Toyota	Bill Slattery's Truck & Bus Sales	7th	Ret	11th	6th	Ret		43
10	Ian Richards	11	Richards 201C Volkswagen	Ian Richards	3rd	Ret	8th	Ret			38
11	Wayne Ford	31	Ralt RT3 Volkswagen; Ralt RT3 Ford	Wayne Ford		8th	Ret		6th	DNS	31
12	David Brabham	8	Ralt RT30 Volkswagen	Australian Motor Racing Pty Ltd		Ret	Ret	1st			30
12	Barry Johnson		Cheetah Mk.8 Ford			Ret		7th		7th	30
14	Dave Thompson	53	Ralt RT4 Nissan	Autosport Pty Ltd		6th	10th			Ret	29
14	David Goode		Elfin 630B			7th		8th			29
16	John Wise		Cheetak Mk.7 Volkswagen							3rd	24
17	Chris Hocking		Cheetak Mk.6 Toyota							4th	21
18	Peter Beehag	14	PBS 852 Nissan	Peter Beehag			5th				19
18	Mike Holmes	22	Elfin 700 Volkswagen	Mike Holmes					5th		19
20	Craig Sparks	3	Richards 201 Volkswagen	Craig Sparks			6th		Ret		17
20	Thomas Crozier	26	Cheetak Mk.8 Volkswagen	Thomas Crozier	DNS				Ret	6th	17
22	Tom Coull	24	Elfin 620B Ford	Tom Coull			Ret		7th		15
23	Bob Jennings	4	Cheetak Mk.7 Nissan	Bob Jennings					8th		14
23	Robert Antel		Elfin GE Two-25 Volkswagen							8th	14
25	Shane Flynn	77	Kaditcha F283A Volkswagen	Avanti Spares	DNS	9th	DNS				13
25	Rodney Moody		Cheetak Mk.6 Toyota							9th	13
27	Graham Sharley	30	Cheetah Toyota	Graham Sharley					10th		12
28	Salvatore Astuti		Cheetak Mk.6 Ford							11th	11
29	Michael Lock	10	Richards 201B Volkswagen	Michael Lock			12th				10
29	Ray Cutchie		Ralt RT4 Ford							12th	10
31	Mike Drewer	45	Cheetak Mk.7 Toyota	Michael John Drewer			13th		Ret		9
32	Tony Rees	78	Ralt RT3	AG Rees			14th				8
32	Max Engellenner		Crabtree BMW							14th	8
	Vince McLaughlan		Cheetah Mk.8 Volkswagen		Ret		Ret		Ret	Ret	0
	Adrian Martin		Ralt RT1 Ford		Ret						0
	Guy Richards		Cheetah BMW		DNS		Ret				0
	Noel Orphan		Elfin 700 Ford			Ret					0
	Rob Newman		Cheetah Mk.7 Toyota					Ret		DNS	0
	Steve Noble		Richards 201B Volkswagen					Ret		DNS	0
	Bob Power		Ralt RT3 Volkswagen					Ret			0
	Barry Ward		Ralt RT30 Volkswagen						Ret	DNS	0
	Carl Gibson		Elfin 792 Volkswagen							Ret	0
	Phil Sutton		Elfin 623		DNS						0
	Ron Barnacle		Wren Volkswagen				DNS			DNS	0
	Mark Potter		Elfin 700 Ford							DNS	0
