= 1980 CRC Chemicals 300 =

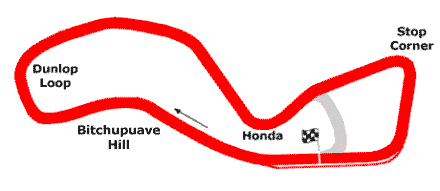
Layout of the Amaroo Park Raceway

The 1980 CRC Chemicals 300 was a Touring Car race staged at Amaroo Park Raceway in New South Wales, Australia on 10 August 1980. The race, which was organised by the Australian Racing Drivers Club, was contested over 155 laps, a total distance of 300.7 km (185.8 miles). It was a non-championship event which did not count towards either the 1980 Australian Touring Car Championship or the 1980 Australian Championship of Makes.

The race was won by Peter Brock and John Harvey driving a Holden Commodore entered by the Marlboro Holden Dealer Team.

== Results ==
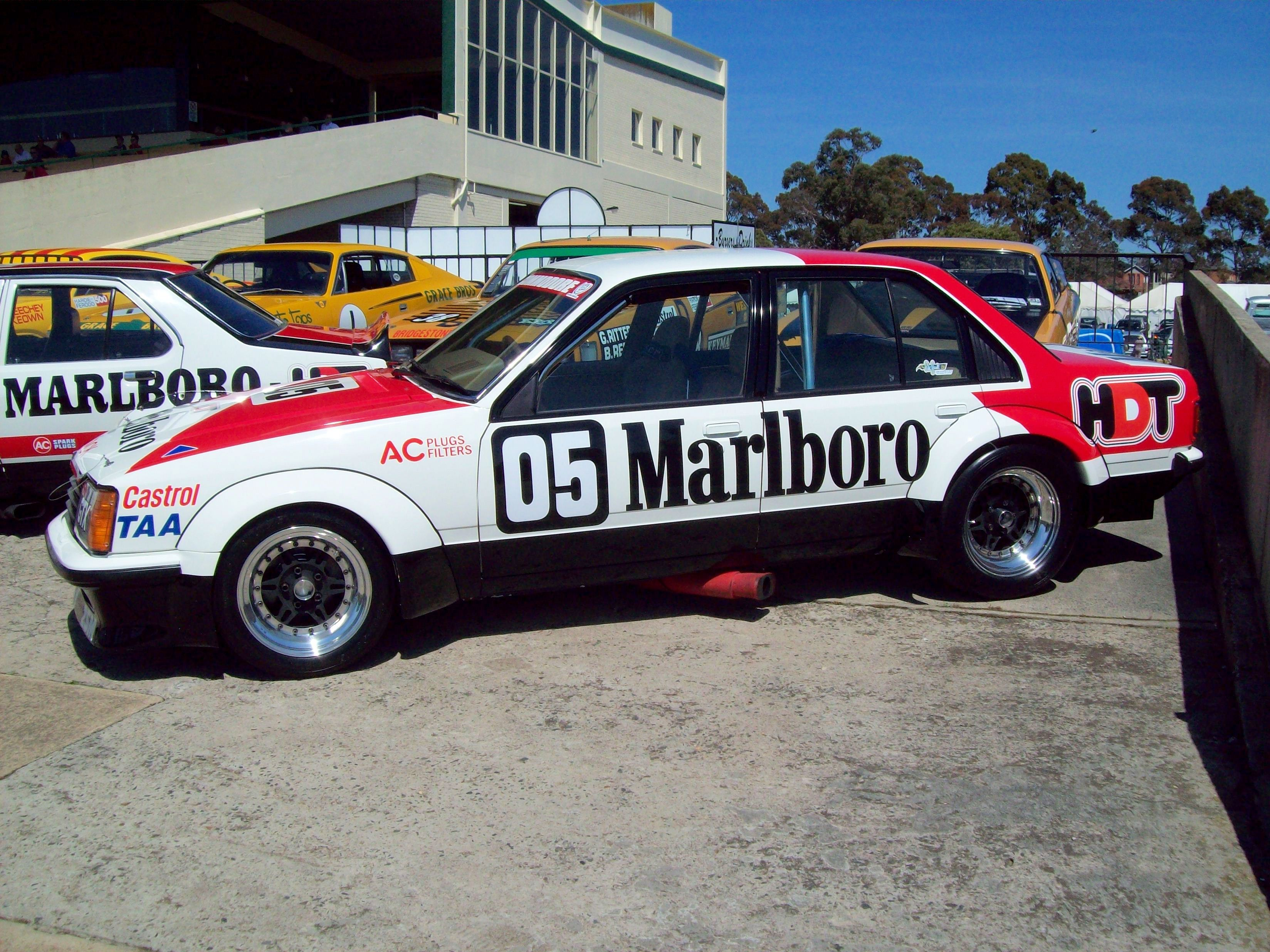
Peter Brock and John Harvey won the race driving a Holden Commodore entered by the Marlboro Holden Dealer Team. (2009 image).

Position	Drivers	No.	Car	Entrant	Class	Class Pos.	Laps
1	Peter Brock, John Harvey	05	Holden Commodore	Marlboro Holden Dealer Team	Over 3000cc	1	155
2	Dick Johnson	17	Ford Falcon XD	D. Johnson	Over 3000cc	2	155
3	Peter Williamson, Charlie O'Brien	77	Toyota Celica	Peter Williamson Pty. Ltd.	Under 2000cc	1	153
4	Barry Seton, Don Smith	44	Ford Capri	Barry Seton	2001-3000cc	1	152
5	Steve Masterton, Colin Bond	52	Ford Capri	Masterton Homes P/L	2001-3000cc	2	152
6	Gary Cooke, Warwick Brown	11	Holden Commodore	Citizen Watches (Aust) Pty. Ltd.	Over 3000cc	3	151
7	John Duggan	10	Mazda RX-3	T. Kavich	2001-3000cc	3	148
8	Alan Browne, Brian Sampson	15	Holden Commodore	Re-Car Racing	Over 3000cc	4	146
9	Ray Gulson, John French	56	Alfa Romeo GTV	R. Gulson	Under 2000cc	2	144
10	Allan Grice, Bob Morris	7	Holden Commodore	Craven Mild Racing	Over 3000cc	5	143
11	John Bundy, N. Carr	94	Mazda RX-3	J.F. Bundy	2001-3000cc	4	143
12	Garry Leggatt, David Seldon	70	Isuzu Gemini	G. C. Leggatt	Under 2000cc	3	143
13	Graham Mein, Geoff Russell	57	Ford Escort	G. Mein	Under 2000cc	4	139
14	Larry Kogge, John Chambers	90	Mazda RX-3	L. Kogge	2001-3000cc	5	138
15	John Gates, Alexandra Surplice	21	Triumph Dolomite	A. Surplice	Under 2000cc	5	116
16	Fred Geissler	80	Holden Commodore	F. Geissler	Over 3000cc	6	109
DNF	Michael O'Hehir, Don Holland	73	Mazda RX-3	M. O'Hehir	2001-3000cc	-	138
DNF	Graeme Bailey, Doug Clark	61	Toyota Celica	Chickadee Chicken	Under 2000cc	-	109
DNF	Barry Jones, Geoff Leeds	41	Mazda RX-3	Darrell Lea Chocolate Shops P/L	2001-3000cc	-	102
DNF	Mike Quinn, John Smith	88	Toyota Corolla Levin	Peter Williamson Pty. Ltd.	Under 2000cc	-	52
DNF	Ron Dickson, Bob Stevens	2	Chevrolet Camaro	R. Dickson	Over 3000cc	-	34
DNF	Murray Carter	18	Ford Falcon XD	M. Carter	Over 3000cc	-	32
DNF	Bill Stanley, Ian Messner	33	Ford Escort	W. G. Stanley	Under 2000cc	-	26
DNF	John Faulkner, Gary Dumbrell	79	Ford Escort	Ford Four Car Club	Under 2000cc	-	12
DNF	Allan Bryant, Graeme Whincup	45	Mazda RX-7	Precinct Performance	2001-3000cc	-	11
DNS	Phil Alexander, Mike Griffin	35	Mazda RX-3	P. Alexander	2001-3000cc	-	-
DNS	Ken Kemp, Greg McCombie	38	Mazda RX-3	K. Kemp	2001-3000cc	-	-
DNS	Terry Daly, Peter Hopwood	12	Ford Capri	Trend Windows Pty. Ltd.	2001-3000cc	-	-
DNS	Peter McLeod, Mal Brewster	30	Mazda RX-7	McLeod Mazda	2001-3000cc	-	-

== Notes ==
- Entries in Official Programme: 40
- Starters: 25
- Finishers: 16
- Pole Position: Peter Brock, 54.7s
- Race time of winning car: 2h 31m 33.5s
- Winning margin: 44.5s
- Fastest Lap: No lap times were recorded
