= Amaroo Park =

Former motor racing circuit in Annangrove, New South Wales, Australia

Amaroo Park Raceway
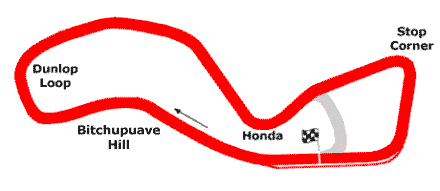
- Location: Annangrove, New South Wales
- Coordinates: 33°39′3″S 150°56′1″E
- Owner: Oscar Glaser
- Opened: 16 November 1963; 62 years ago Reopened: 31 May 1970; 55 years ago
- Closed: Closed 1st time: Mid-1968; Closed 2nd time: 23 August 1998; 27 years ago
- Major events: Australian Super Touring Championship (1996–1997); Australian Touring Car Championship (1974–1978, 1985–1994); Sun-7 Chesterfield Series (1971–1981); Castrol 6 Hour (1970–1987); Amaroo Park 300 (1980–1987)

Full Circuit (1967–1998)
- Length: 1.930 km (1.199 mi)
- Turns: 10
- Race lap record: 0:44.36 ( (Australia) John Bowe, Veskanda C1, 1987, Group A Sports Cars)

Amaroo Park Raceway was a 1.930 km (1.199 mi) motor racing circuit located in Annangrove, New South Wales, in the present-day north-western suburbs of Sydney, Australia. Opened in 1963, the road circuit served as a venue for a variety of competitions including the Castrol 6 Hour motorcycle race, rounds of the Australian Touring Car Championship, Australian Drivers' Championship, Australian Formula Ford Championship, Australian Sports Sedan Championship, the AMSCAR Series for touring cars, historic racing and others. The last Australian Touring Car Championship round to take place at the circuit was in 1994.

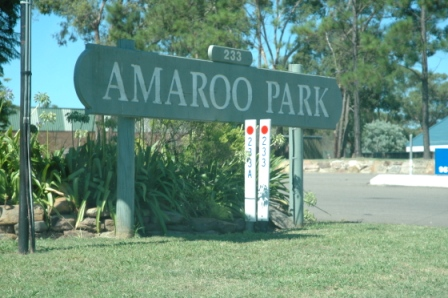
The Amaroo Park sign fronting Annangrove Road is still in place.

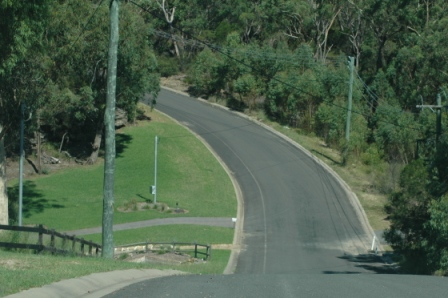
This road (signposted as Hillclimb Drive) was built over a section of the spectator area, and was not part of the actual racing circuit. The actual hillclimb was located some 1.5 km (0.93 mi) to the north of the main circuit. Today's Everett Pl. was the access rd for the hillclimb.

From 1970, Amaroo Park was run and promoted by the Australian Racing Drivers Club (ARDC) who also promoted the Mount Panorama Circuit in Bathurst, and later were the promoters of Sydney's Eastern Creek Raceway.

The ARDC lost money promoting the Super Touring Bathurst 1000 from 1997 to 1999 and this circuit was sold to recover some of the loss.

== History ==
Amaroo Park was built by Industrialist Oscar Glaser as part of a plan to build a full motorsport complex. This began with a hillclimb track, as well as a dirt short track, a motocross track, a little used speedway track, and finally the main (relatively short) 1.8 km bitumen track. A full length Grand Prix circuit was planned but never built. The name Amaroo comes from the Aboriginal word meaning beautiful place.

The first motorcycle meeting was held on 26 February with a 30 lap production race won by Larry Simons on a BSA Mk.ll Spitfire in heavy rain.

The official opening meeting, promoted by the Amaroo Sporting Country Club, was held on 12 March 1967 with attendance restricted to members of several motoring clubs, around 1000 spectators visiting. The first event open to the general public was held on 9 April. More events followed, however poor spectator attendances blamed in part on poor facilities lead to the temporary closure of the circuit in mid 1968.

The circuit reopened on 31 May 1970 with much improved spectator facilities and racing now run by the ARDC, with the first of the motorcycle endurance races which came to be known as the Castrol Six Hour run by the Willoughby District Motorcycle Club later that year.

Amaroo Park held its own touring car series from 1971 to 1993, initially as the Sun-7 Chesterfield Series and then under various names, including the "AMSCAR Series" from 1982.

The complex had a hillclimb, a motocross track, a little used speedway track and a short circuit track.

The circuit closed forever after the last meeting was held there on 23 August 1998. The meeting was billed as the "Goodbye Amaroo State open Meeting" with a mix of classes including Sports Sedans, HQ's and Group N Historic Touring Cars. The final race held at Amaroo Park was a "Butchers Picnic" which included the top 3 cars from the competing classes all in one final race. The race was run as a Butchers Picnic as a salute to the very first meetings at the circuit where the first races run were indeed Butchers' Picnics. The race, called "The Last Race, The Main Event, Amaroo's Final Fling" started at 4:30 pm and was held over 10 laps. It was won by Sydney driver Ray Lintott driving a 4WD, twin-turbo Porsche 911 Turbo with a race time of 9:16.4942. The final driver, Andrew Papadopoulos driving an Alfa Romeo GTV, crossed the line at 4:40 pm bringing the curtain down on one of Australia's most popular race circuits after over 31 years of continuous operation. The ARDC also let Arthur Hayes, their No. 1 member (meaning he was card holder #1) wave the chequered flag for the race.

== A Lap of Amaroo Park ==
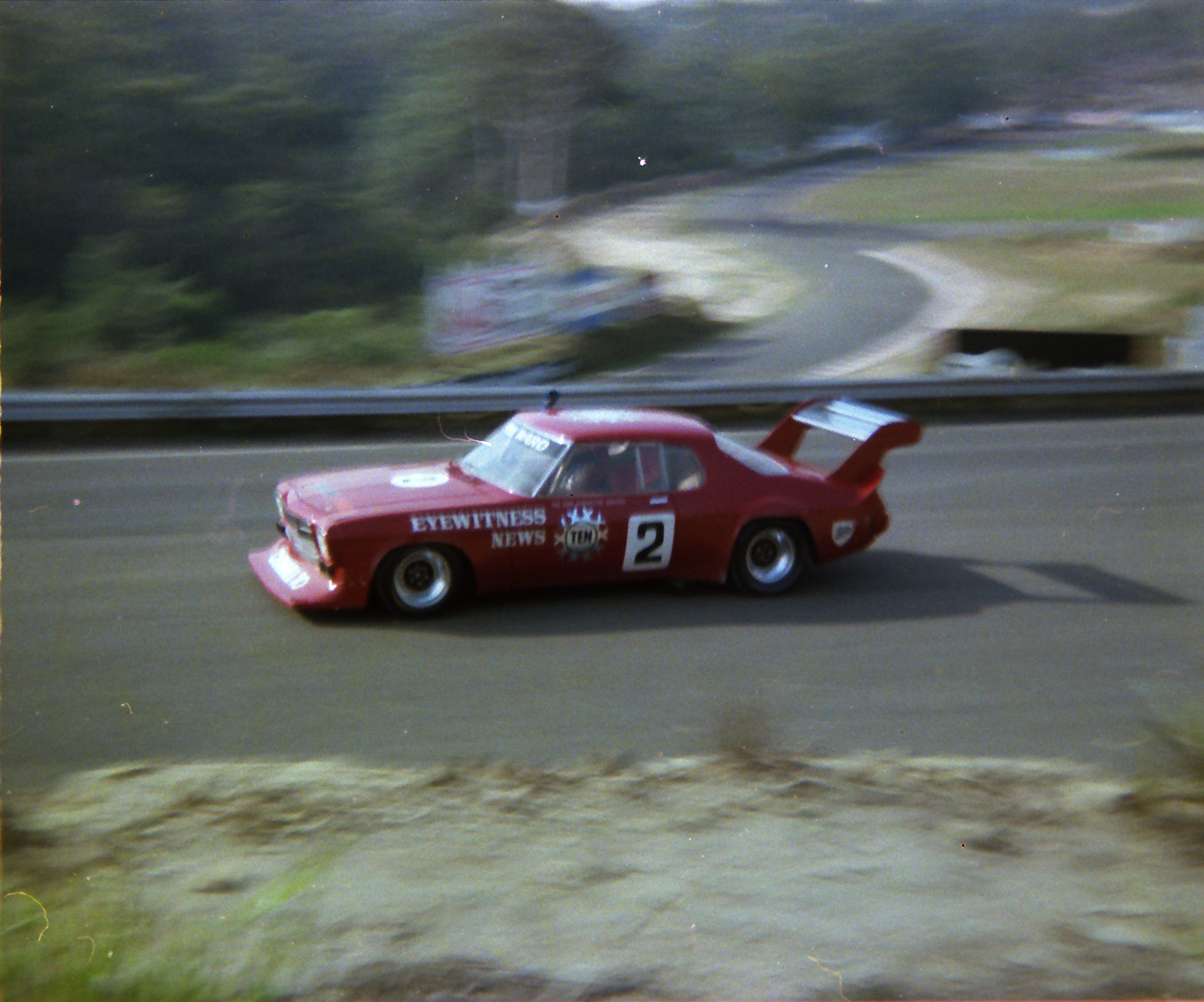
Phil Ward in his Holden Monaro Sports Sedan at the top of Bitupave Hill in 1980. The road in the background is the run from Honda to the Stop Corner clearly showing the elevation changes on the tight 1.930 km (1.199 mi) circuit

Amaroo Park started on the short pit straight, and from there the track had a kink to the right up towards Bitupave Hill. The track then turned left and dropped down into the right hand Dunlop Loop and onto the back straight which again kinked to the right and led into the tight left hander at Honda Corner. Prior to 1983, Honda Corner had no runoff on the inside of the track and was earth banking surrounded by a concrete wall. After the turn at Honda, there was another short right hand kink leading up to the tight right hand Stop Corner (sometimes called the Lake Corner). From there it was a short straight up to Wunderlich Corner, with the pit entry on the outside of the turn. Known as Wunderlich for sponsorship reasons, the turn was known during the 1970s as Ron Hodgson Corner due to sponsorship from Sydney's then largest Holden dealer, was the final turn on the circuit and led back onto the pit straight.

At the fastest part of the circuit, the run up to Bitupave Hill, the faster cars (Sports Sedans, Sports Cars and F5000) were able to reach just over 220 km/h (137 mph). Dunlop Loop, Honda and the Stop Corner were generally regarded as the best passing spots on the track.

During the late 1980s in order to slow down the motorbikes through the final turn which with zero runoff was seen as too dangerous, a small chicane was built into the inside of the corner.

At its closing the outright lap record for the 1.930 km (1.199 mi) circuit was 0:44.36, set by John Bowe in 1987 driving a 5.8L Chevrolet powered Veskanda C1 sports car.

== Australian Touring Car Championship ==
Amaroo Park first held a round of the Australian Touring Car Championship when it hosted Round 4 of the 1974 Australian Touring Car Championship. The race was won by Peter Brock driving a Holden Dealer Team Holden LJ Torana GTR XU-1. The circuit would go on to host 15 rounds of the championship between 1974 and its last ATCC round in 1994. The last race was won by Mark Skaife driving his Gibson Motorsport Holden VP Commodore giving Holden the bookends on Amaroo Park's participation in the ATCC.

Year	Winning Driver	Car	Team
Group C
1974	Peter Brock	Holden LJ Torana GTR XU-1	Holden Dealer Team
1975	Bob Morris	Holden LH Torana SL/R 5000 L34	Ron Hodgson Motors
1976	Charlie O'Brien	Holden LH Torana SL/R 5000 L34	
1977	Allan Moffat	Ford XB Falcon GT Hardtop	Moffat Ford Dealers
1978	Allan Grice	Holden LX Torana SS A9X Hatchback	Craven Mild Racing
Group A
1985	Jim Richards	BMW 635 CSi	JPS Team BMW
1986	Robbie Francevic	Volvo 240T	Mark Petch Motorsport
1987	Jim Richards	BMW M3	JPS Team BMW
1988	John Bowe	Ford Sierra RS500	Shell Ultra-Hi Racing
1989	John Bowe	Ford Sierra RS500	Shell Ultra-Hi Racing
1990	Jim Richards	Nissan Skyline HR31 GTS-R	Nissan Motorsport Australia
1991	Tony Longhurst	BMW M3 Evolution	Benson & Hedges Racing
1992	Mark Skaife	Nissan Skyline R32 GT-R	Winfield Team Nissan
Group 3A 5.0L Touring Cars
1993	John Bowe	Ford EB Falcon	Shell Racing
1994	Mark Skaife	Holden VP Commodore	Winfield Racing

== AMSCAR Series ==
One of the features of Amaroo Park's history has been the AMSCAR Series for touring cars, created by Amaroo's promoters, the Australian Racing Drivers Club and staged annually from 1982 to 1993. Popular with spectators and easy for Sydney's Channel 7 to telecast, it became the backbone of the Sydney touring car scene, a scene which once consisted mostly of privateers who have largely disappeared since Amaroo closed, with the major touring car teams now operating from Melbourne and south-east Queensland. On many occasions these events featured larger grid numbers than did the rounds of the national level Australian Touring Car Championship. This was mostly as the large number of Sydney privateers who usually filled the grid in the nationally televised (by Ch.7) Bathurst 1000, rarely raced outside of NSW or Queensland due to limited budgets.

The AMSCAR Series had its origins in Amaroo's own Sun-7 Chesterfield Series for touring cars, first held in 1971 and was won by Sydney's Lakis Manticas driving a Morris Cooper S. This would continue, under various names relating to series sponsorship, through to 1981. It was only from the beginning of the "Group A" category in Australia in 1985 that the headline teams started appearing in the series on a more regular basis, with part of the reason being that as Group A was new to Australia in 1985, the AMSCAR Series gave teams valuable testing under race conditions (also because from 1985 Amaroo would hold an annual round of the ATCC).

Frank Gardner's JPS Team BMW and its drivers Jim Richards and Tony Longhurst dominated from 1985 to 1987 (Richards in the 635 CSi was unbeaten at Amaroo in 1985 winning all 12 AMSCAR races, the ATCC round and the Endurance Championship race), while Gibson Motorsport, first with Nissan and later with Holden, also contested the series in the later years of Group A and into the new 5.0L V8 formula introduced in 1993, with Jim Richards winning in the team's Nissan Skyline GT-R in 1992 while Mark Skaife won for Gibson driving a Holden VP Commodore in 1993. Other top line teams to contest the AMSCAR series after the switch to Group A were Peter Brock's Holden Dealer Team (later known as Mobil 1 Racing), Dick Johnson Racing, 1988 series winner Colin Bond's Caltex CXT Racing Team, Tony Longhurst's Benson & Hedges team (evolved from JPS Team BMW), as well as Robbie Francevic's Volvo team.

The increasing national popularity of the Australian Touring Car Championship, improvements in Channel 7's ATCC telecast, and the 1991 economic recession which saw a number of privateer teams only racing in the two ATCC rounds in Sydney and the Bathurst 1000, all gradually reduced the grids until the AMSCAR Series was discontinued after the 1993 season. It was revived in 1997 and held at the ARDC's two circuits, Amaroo Park and Eastern Creek, but with the major teams holding exclusivity to V8 Supercar events, the mostly Sydney-based privateers were not numerous enough to make the series viable and the series folded after 1997.

== Amaroo Park 300 ==
Between 1980 and 1987, Amaroo Park ran what was usually the second endurance race of the touring car season (the Adelaide International Raceway endurance race usually preceded it by two weeks), though it was not until 1983 that it became a round of the Australian Endurance Championship.

The races were held over 155 laps of the 1.930 km (1.199 mi) circuit for a total of 300.7 km (186.8 mi). The 1984 Silastic 300 was the only race held under wet conditions. The final race in 1987 was known as the Hardie Irrigation 100 due to the distance being shortened to 100 laps rather than the usual 155.

=== Amaroo Park 300 winners ===
Year	Event name	Winning Driver(s)	Car	Team
Group C
1980	CRC Chemicals 300	Peter Brock; John Harvey	Holden VB Commodore	Marlboro Holden Dealer Team
1981	CRC Chemicals 300	Peter Brock; John Harvey	Holden VC Commodore	Marlboro Holden Dealer Team
1982	CRC Chemicals 300	Alan Jones; Barry Jones	Mazda RX-7	Barry Jones
1983	Silastic 300	George Fury	Nissan Bluebird Turbo	Nissan Motor Company
1984	Silastic 300	Gary Scott	Nissan Bluebird Turbo	Nissan Motorsport Australia
Group A
1985	Better Brakes 300	Jim Richards	BMW 635 CSi	JPS Team BMW
1986	Better Brakes 300	Jim Richards	BMW 635 CSi	JPS Team BMW
1987	Hardie Irrigation 100	Jim Richards	BMW M3	JPS Team BMW

== National championship rounds ==
Rounds of various Australian motor racing championship were held at the circuit.

=== Australian Drivers' Championship ===
Year	Driver	Car	Entrant
Australian Formula 1
1981	Alfredo Costanzo	McLaren M26 Chevrolet	Porsche Cars Australia
Formula Mondial
1985	John Bowe	Ralt RT4 Ford	Chris Leach Enterprises
1986	Terry Ryan	Ralt RT4 Ford	Terry Ryan Automotive
Australian Formula 2
1988	Barry Ward	Ralt RT30 Volkswagen	Barry Ward
Formula Holden
1989*	Neil Crompton	Ralt RT20 Holden	Boylan Racing
1989*	Simon Kane	Ralt RT21 Holden	Clive Kane Photography
1990	Mark Poole	Shrike NB89H Holden	TAFE Team Motorsport

* Amaroo hosted two rounds of the 1989 Australian Drivers' Championship (both held on the same day). Neil Crompton won Round 7 and Simon Kane won Round 8.

=== Australian Formula 2 Championship ===
Year	Driver	Car	Entrant
1972	Larry Perkins	Elfin 600B/E Ford	Provincial Motors
1973	Leo Geoghegan	Birrana 272 Ford	Grace Bros – 5AD City State Racing Team
1974	Bob Muir	Rennmax BN6 Ford	Bob & Marj Brown
1975	Geoff Brabham	Birrana 274 Ford	Bob & Marj Brown
1980	John Smith	Ralt RT1 Ford	John Smith
1981	John Smith	Ralt RT1 Ford	Ralt Australia
1984	Peter Glover	Cheetah Mk 7 Volkswagen	Peter Glover
1985	Peter Glover	Cheetah Mk 8 Volkswagen	Peter Glover
1987	David Brabham	Ralt RT30 Volkswagen	Australian Motor Racing Pty Ltd
1988	Barry Ward	Ralt RT30 Volkswagen	Barry Ward

=== Australian Sports Car Championship ===
Year	Driver	Car	Entrant
1976	Ian Geoghegan	Porsche 911S	Ian Geoghegan
1977	Alan Hamilton	Porsche 934 Turbo	Porsche Distributors
1978	Ross Bond	Bolwell Nagari	Ross Bond
1980	John Latham	Porsche Turbo	John Latham
1986	John Bowe	Veskanda C1 Chevrolet	Bernie van Elsen
1987	John Bowe	Veskanda C1 Chevrolet	Bernie van Elsen
1988	Ray Hanger	Rennmax Ford	Ray Hanger

=== Australian Sports Sedan Championship ===
Year	Driver	Car	Entrant
1980	Jim Richards	Ford XC Falcon Hardtop	Jim Richards
1981	Tony Edmondson	Alfa Romeo Alfetta GTV Chevrolet	Donald Elliott

== Lap records ==
For almost 10 years, Kevin Bartlett held Amaroo Park's outright lap record of 46.2 set in his Lola T332. This was broken on 26 May 1985 by reigning Australian Drivers' Champion John Bowe who recorded a 44.60 lap during the second round of the 1985 Australian Drivers' Championship, a race that Bartlett was actually doing television commentary on for Channel 7. Bowe himself then broke his own track record just under two years later when he recorded a lap of 44.36 in his Chevrolet powered Veskanda C1 during the second round of the 1987 Australian Sports Car Championship. That lap would stand as the lap record until the circuits closure in 1997.

The fastest official race lap records at the Amaroo Park are listed as:

Category	Time	Driver	Vehicle	Date
Full Circuit (1967–1998): 1.930 km (1.199 mi)
Group A / Group C Sports Cars	0:44.36	John Bowe	Veskanda C1	17 May 1987
Formula Mondial	0:44.60	John Bowe	Ralt RT4/85	26 May 1985
Formula Holden	0:45.07	Neil Crompton	Ralt RT20	6 August 1989
Formula 5000	0:46.2	Kevin Bartlett	Lola T332	1976
Australian Formula 2	0:46.52	Arthur Abrahams	Cheetah Mk 8	21 June 1987
Super Touring	0:50.157	Brad Jones	Audi A4 Quattro	20 July 1997
Group A Touring Car (1601-2500cc)	0:50.84	Tony Longhurst	BMW M3 Evolution	10 May 1992
Group A Touring Car (2501-6000cc)	0:50.88	Colin Bond	Ford Sierra RS500	10 May 1992
Group C Touring Car (3001-6000cc)	0:52.3	Bob Morris	Mazda RX-7	8 July 1984
Group C Touring Car (Up to 3000cc)	0:53.7	Fred Gibson	Nissan Bluebird Turbo	10 April 1983
Group A Touring Car (Up to 1600cc)	0:55.56	John Smith	Toyota Corolla AE82 Sedan	17 May 1987
