= 1981 CRC Chemicals 300 =

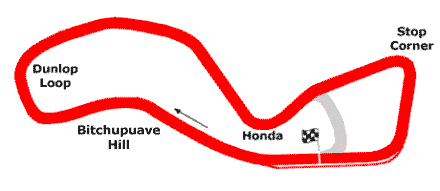
Layout of the Amaroo Park Raceway

The 1981 CRC Chemicals 300 was a Touring Car race staged at Amaroo Park Raceway in New South Wales, Australia on 9 August 1981. The race, which was organised by the Australian Racing Drivers Club, was contested over 155 laps, a total distance of 299.1 km. It was a non-championship event which did not count towards either the 1981 Australian Touring Car Championship or the 1981 Australian Endurance Championship.

The race was won by Peter Brock and John Harvey driving a Holden Commodore VC entered by the Marlboro Holden Dealer Team.

== Class structure ==
Cars competed in three classes:

- Four & five cylinders
- Six cylinders & Rotary
- Eight cylinders & over

== Results ==
Position	Drivers	No.	Car	Entrant	Laps
1	Peter Brock, John Harvey	05	Holden Commodore VC	Marlboro Holden Dealer Team	155
2	Dick Johnson	17	Ford Falcon XD	Palmer Tube Mills	155
3	Allan Grice	11	BMW 635 CSi	JPS Team	154
4	Warren Cullen, Gary Cooke	12	Holden Commodore VC	Warren Cullen	153
5	Steve Masterton, Bruce Stewart		Ford Capri	Masterton Homes	153
6	Barry Jones, Geoff Leeds	41	Mazda RX-7	Darrell Lea	152
7	Kevin Bartlett, Bob Forbes	9	Chevrolet Camaro	Nine Network Racing	151
8	David Seldon, Phil Ward	7	Isuzu Gemini ZZ	Suttons Motors	147
9	John Gates, John Craft		Ford Capri	Hulcraft Autos	147
10	Graham Mein, Geoff Russell		Ford Escort	Graham Mein	145
11	Alexandra Surplice, Doug Clark		Toyota Corolla	Alexandra Surplice	145
12	Peter McLeod, Peter Dane		Mazda RX-7	Peter McLeod	141
13	Terry Daly, Peter Hopwood		Ford Capri	Trend Windows	138
14	Garry Willmington, Bob Stevens		Ford Falcon	Garry Willmington	134
DNF	Peter Williamson, John Smith	77	Toyota Celica		89
DNF	Graeme Bailey, Steve Land		Toyota Celica	Chickadee	
DNF	Tony Edmondson, Brown	4	Holden Commodore VC	Re-Car	54
DNF	Colin Bond, Smith		Ford Capri		
DNF	Fred Geisler, Rogers		Holden Commodore VC		
DNF	Bob Muir, Geoghegan		Ford Falcon	Army Reserve	
DNF	Murray Carter		Ford Falcon		
DNF	Brian Callaghan, McKay		Ford Falcon XD		
DNF	Bob Holden		Ford Escort		
DNF	Phil Alexander		Mazda RX-3		
DNF	Charlie O'Brien		Holden Commodore VC	Citizens Watches	2

== Notes ==
- Entries: 37
- Pole Position: Dick Johnson, 54.0s
- Starters: 25
- Finishers: 14
- Race time of winning car: 2h 31m 16.8s
- Winning margin: 5.8s
- Four & five cylinders class winners: David Seldon & Phil Ward (Isuzu Gemini ZZ)
- Six cylinders & Rotary class winners: Allan Grice (BMW 635 CSi)
