= 1982 CRC Chemicals 300 =

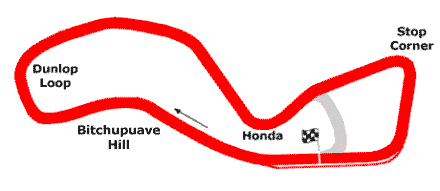
Layout of the Amaroo Park Raceway

The 1982 CRC Chemicals 300 was a motor race for Group C Touring Cars held at Amaroo Park Raceway in New South Wales, Australia on 8 August 1982. It was staged over 155 laps, a total distance of 300.7 km (186.85 miles). The race was organised by the Australian Racing Drivers Club.

The race was won by Alan Jones and Barry Jones driving a Mazda RX-7.

== Results ==
Position	Drivers	No.	Car	Entrant	Class	Laps
1	Alan Jones; Barry Jones	41	Mazda RX-7	Darrell Lea	Over 3000cc	155
2	Fred Gibson	56	Nissan Bluebird Turbo	Nissan Motorsport Australia	Up to 3000cc	154
3	Alan Browne; Allan Grice	4	Holden VH Commodore SS	Re-Car Racing	Over 3000cc	153
4	Larry Perkins; Gary Scott	05	Holden VH Commodore SS	Marlboro Holden Dealer Team	Over 3000cc	153
5	Phil Alexander; Ron Gillard	35	Mazda RX-7	Tokico	Over 3000cc	152
6	Jim Richards	31	BMW 635 CSi	JPS Team BMW	Over 3000cc	148
7	Greg Toepfer; Ken Mathews	19	Holden VH Commodore SS	Citizen's Watches Australia Pty Ltd	Over 3000cc	147
8	Brian Callaghan; Bob Muir	47	Ford XD Falcon	Brian Callaghan	Over 3000cc	144
9	Barry Seton; John Craft		Ford Capri III 3.0S	Hulcraft Autos	Up to 3000cc	144
10	Charlie O'Brien; Clive Benson-Browne	11	Holden VH Commodore SS	Launceston Hotel	Over 3000cc	106
?	Tony Kavich; Phil Ward	30	Mazda RX-7	Bagalow Motors Pty Ltd	Over 3000cc	
DNF	Terry Finnigan; John Gates	15	Holden VH Commodore SS		Over 3000cc	
DNF	George Fury	55	Nissan Bluebird Turbo	Nissan Motorsport Australia	Up to 3000cc	138?
DNF	Murray Carter; Rusty French	18	Ford XD Falcon	John Sands Racing	Over 3000cc	123?
DNF	Garry Rogers; Ron Wanless	16	Holden VH Commodore SS	Re-Car Racing	Over 3000cc	120?
DNF	Garry Willmington; Mike Griffin	8	Ford XD Falcon	Garry Willmington Performance	Over 3000cc	110
DNF	Terry Shiel	37	Mazda RX-7	Eurocars Mazda	Over 3000cc	70?
DNF	Warren Cullen; Garry Cooke	22	Holden VH Commodore SS		Over 3000cc	25
DNF	Barry Lawrence; Geoff Russell	28	Holden VH Commodore SS	Bayside Spares	Over 3000cc	12
DNF	Peter Dane; Peter McLeod	40	Mazda RX-7	Strongbow Racing Team	Over 3000cc	3
DNF	John Duggan; Don Holland	?	Mazda RX-7		Over 3000cc	0

=== Note ===
- Pole Position: Alan Jones (Mazda RX-7), 53.1s
- Entries: 35
- Starters: 21
- Finishers: 11
- Winners race time: 2 hr 28 min 22.9 sec
