= Birrana =

Australian motor racing organization

Birrana was the name of two motor racing organisations, both associated with South Australian racing driver and engineer Malcolm Ramsay. From 1971 to 1978 Birrana constructed a series of successful open-wheel racing cars under the Birrana name. It also constructed a Holden Kingswood HQ for Ramsay to compete in Group C Improved Production Touring Cars racing.

Ramsay brought the Birrana name back to motor racing in the 1990s running a series of Reynard Motorsport built Formula 3000 chassis in the Australian Drivers' Championship. Birrana came to dominate the championship winning titles with Jason Bright, Paul Stokell, Rick Kelly and Simon Wills as well as giving Mark Webber his first racing experience of wings and slicks open-wheeler racing. As Formula Holden started to wither, Birrana moved into V8 Supercar with Wills. Ramsay reduced his involvement as the team morphed into Team Dynamik. Today Ramsay continues the Birrana name as a mechanical engineering firm servicing the mining industry.

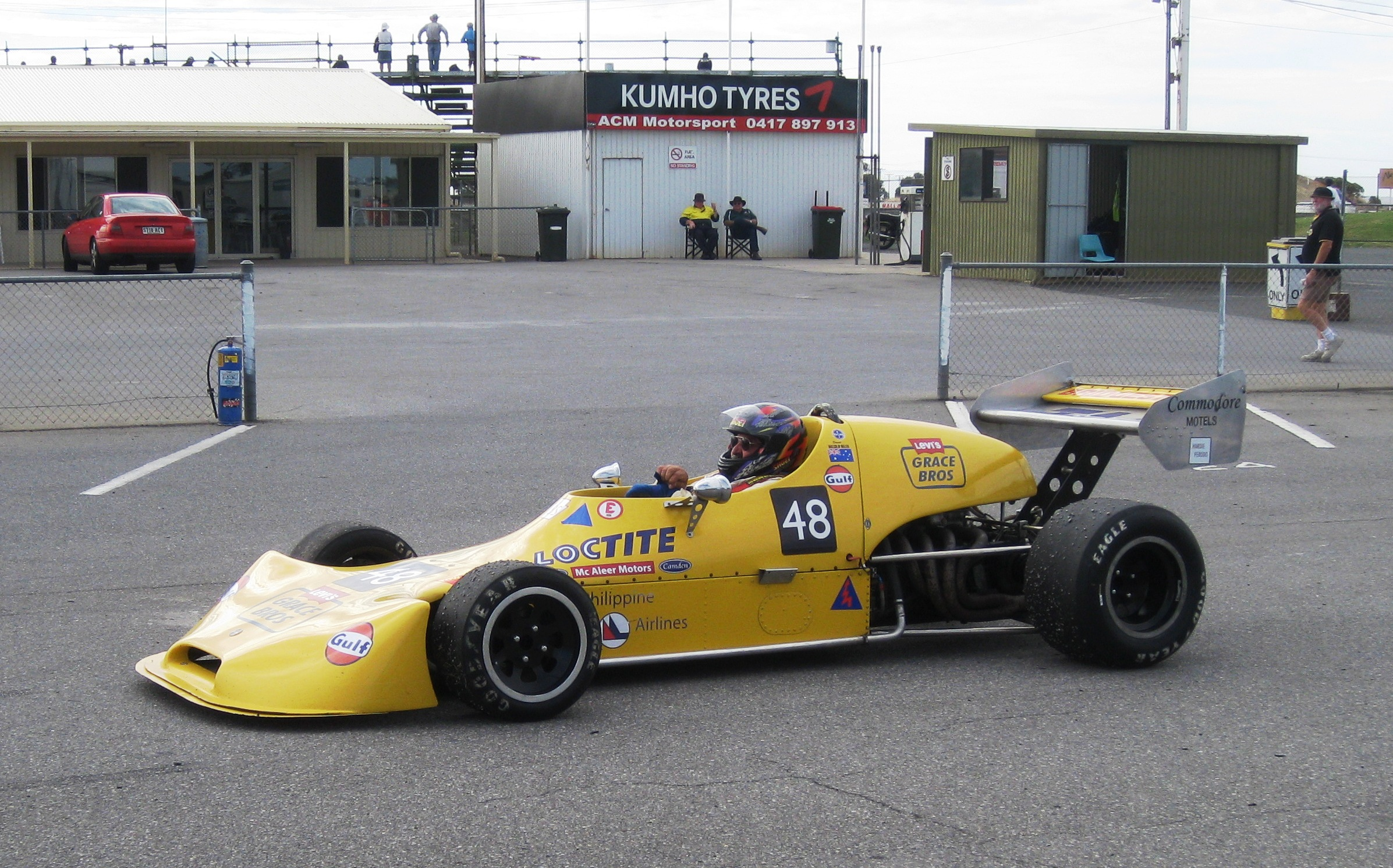
The Birrana 274 with which Leo Geoghegan won the 1974 Australian Formula 2 Championship, pictured in 2010

== Racing cars ==
=== Early designs ===
==== Birrana Formula Ford ====
The first Birrana was a Formula Ford built by Tony Alcock in 1971 for John Goss. Alcock was a designer builder who had previously worked for Elfin Sports Cars in Adelaide and for Brabham, Cosworth, McLaren and Cooper. "Birrana" is an Australian aboriginal word meaning "throwing stick".

==== Birrana 272 ====
The Birrana 272 was a monocoque Australian Formula 2 car, constructed by Alcock in Adelaide for South Australian racing driver Malcolm Ramsay. The 272 won the Australian Formula 2 class on its debut at the Sandown round of the 1972 Australian Drivers' Championship in April. It was later sold to Peter Brock, and subsequently won the opening round of the 1973 Australian Formula 2 Championship in the hands of Leo Geoghegan.

=== Birrana Racing Cars Pty Ltd ===
Birrana Racing Cars Pty Ltd was formed later in 1972 by Alcock and Ramsay and construction of racing cars was undertaken in a former service station in suburban Adelaide. The company would go on to sell a total of 16 cars.

==== Birrana F72 ====
The first car sold by Birrana Racing Cars was a Formula Ford, the F72 produced in 1972 for Steven Drewhurst of Melbourne.

==== Birrana 273 ====
The 273 was an Australian Formula 2 car. Leo Geoghegan used a factory team 273 to win the 1973 Australian Formula 2 Championship from Enno Busselman in a 273 entered by Bob & Marj Brown. Graeme Crawford also drove a 273 to win the 1976 Australian Formula 2 Championship.

Peter Brock also drove an ex-Leo Geoghegan Birrana 273 during the 1973 Australian F2 Championship, finishing second at Oran Park and sixth at Amaroo, while also winning a number of non-championship races. Brock ran the Birrana under the "Team Brock" banner and the car used a Ford engine, and later a Hart engine. Brock's Holden Dealer Team boss Harry Firth claimed that he let Brock race the Birrana to get formula cars out of his system.

==== Birrana F73 ====
The F73 was a Formula Ford design. Richard Carter drove an F73 to victory in the 1976 TAA Formula Ford Driver to Europe Series.

==== Birrana 274 ====
The 274 was the company's new Australian Formula 2 car for 1974 with Malcolm Ramsay announcing plans to build an initial batch of six cars. A 274 was used by Leo Geoghegan to win the 1974 Australian Formula 2 Championship from Bob Muir in a 273. Geoff Brabham took a 274 to victory in the 1975 Australian Formula 2 Championship.

==== Birrana 374 ====
The 374 was an Australian Formula 3 car.

Birrana Racing Cars Pty Ltd was closed in 1974. Bob and Marj Brown took two Birrana 273s and Tony Alcock to England to compete in the 1975 Formula Atlantic series. Later, Tony Alcock joined Graham Hill's Embassy Racing Formula One team. Later that year he was killed in a plane crash which also took the lives of Hill and four other Embassy Racing team members. There were three 374’s made by the team all that were very successful on track.

==== Birrana S74 ====
The S74 was a speedcar built to run at the Adelaide International Raceway half-mile bitumen oval. It utilised a mid-engined configuration.

==== Birrana A78 ====
The Birrana A78 was built by Malcolm Ramsay using 273 and 274 components for Ramsay to contest Rothmans Series events in Malaysia in 1978. Ramsay finished second in the Penang Grand Prix and the Selangor Grand Prix and third in Malaysian Grand Prix and was leading the series when it was cancelled. The A78, which was the last model to carry the Birrana name, was later sold to John Holmes of Queensland as were all Birrana patterns, jigs and dies.
