= Alpha Sports Productions =

Australian kit car manufacturer

Alpha Street Productions or Alpha Sports Productions
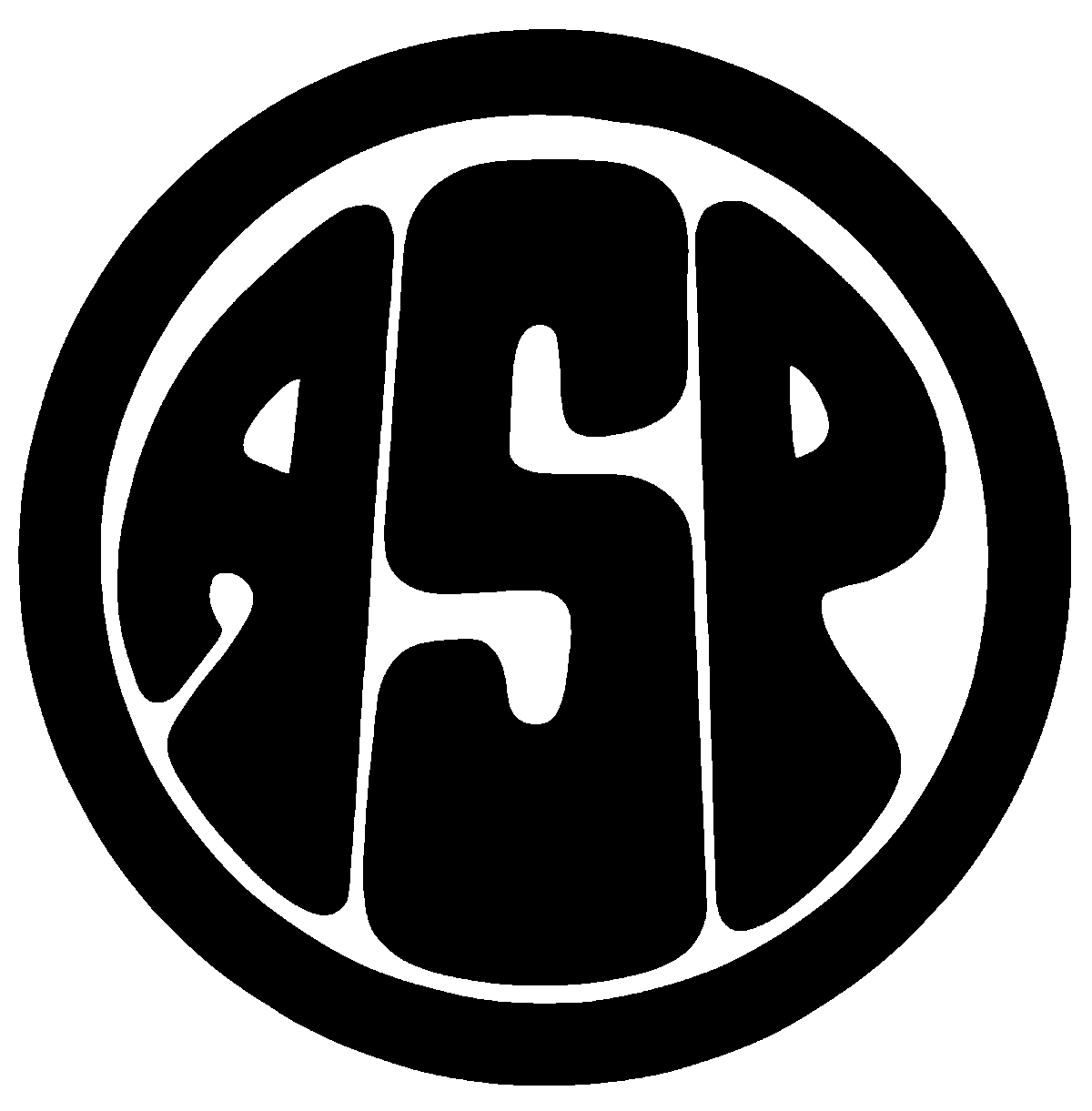
- Type: Private
- Industry: Automotive
- Founded: 1964
- Founder: Ray Lewis, Rory Thompson
- Headquarters: Adelaide, Australia
- Key people: Col Reilly, Doug Trengove
- Products: ASP 320, 330, 340, and 350
- Services: Automobile manufacturing

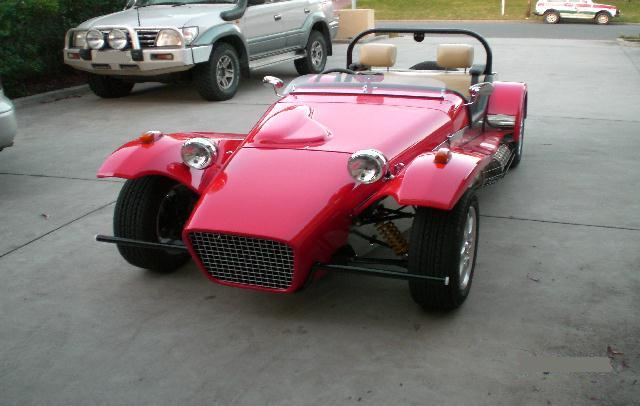
ASP 320 G model, running a Toyota 4AGE 20 Valve 1.6 L twin cam engine.

Alpha Street productions and later Alpha Sports Productions (ASP) were an Australian kit car and racing car manufacturer. It has made sports cars and open wheeler cars. Originally building cars based on the Lotus Seven but have evolved to construct their own distinctive designs.

== History ==
Alpha street productions was founded by Ray Lewis and Rory Thompson in the early sixties after the two had met through a common interest in sportscars. Ray, the part owner of Lewis Brothers Buses amongst other businesses provided the premises for their venture at his family home of Alpha house on Alpha Street Kensington Park in Adelaide. Rory however provided the technical knowledge after earning qualifications in mechanical engineering from the South Australian Institute of Technology.

Working initially on a Lotus 7 for Derek Jolly Rory decided certain deficiencies of the Lotus design could be overcome with the design of a new chassis. This first attempt at an entire car was named the Bacchus after the Greek god of wine. The first of the chassis was sold bare but further cars were built with a variety of drivetrains fitted.

After Ray returned from an overseas trip work began on what was now the Mk4 Bacchus Clubman. This car was renamed twice though, first from Bacchus to Shrike and then from Shrike to ASP, the company's initials. This first road car was known as the ASP 320A and was the only one of its type built. This car was sold to Paul Hannon who worked for the Savings Bank of South Australia and had spent time at the ASP premises when he was younger. The connection to the bank led the car to being used in an advertising campaign, driving sales of what was now the B spec of the new ASP Clubman.

Starting with the ASP 320B ASP started to build a car specifically for racing with four 320B's produced for this purpose, although most have found their way onto road registration since. From these 320B Clubmans came a short wheelbase version renamed the 340A. this was the beginning of a series of racing Clubmans. This first car known also as the Potts lightweight was owned by Doug Potts was powered by a Galant motor and was later converted to a road car by ASP employee Colin Reilly.

At about this time, 1971, ASP branched out into open wheeler formula cars with Formula 2 and 3 cars, the ASP 330. Four of these cars were built in period, three racing in Formula 3 and one in Formula 2. After this ASP returned exclusively to Clubman-style sports cars.

In 1972 two 340B cars were produced of a completely new design. One of these cars, Chassis 23 was built for Jim Doig who was still racing the car in 2021 and despite a large crash at The Bend in South Australia is intending to fix the car and have it back on track in 2022 for the cars 50th year. This design was followed closely by the 340C built from 1972 to 73. Six of these cars were built and all but one seem to have survived the intervening years.

These cars followed the Clubman Formula: single camshaft engine of no more than 1.3 litres capacity, front engine two seat racing cars. All were powered by either the Toyota Corolla 3K or Datsun A12 engine and ran a differential from a Morris.

By 1974 it had become clear that the company's finances were not as they should be, and a series of issues caused Ray to decide to wind the company up with Ray and Rory going their separate ways. However, after building some new road going ASP Clubmans in his spare time Rory decided to start a new business Alpha Sports Productions to build new models of the ASP 320. These were built by their owners under the supervision of Rory at his premises in Salisbury and not only resulted in a car, but the learning of all the skills to build the car being acquired by the owner. The final cars were known as the ASP 320G and were generally powered by 4AGE engines from a Toyota with some later owners moving to Mazda engines.

Ray Lewis died in November 2005. His previous years had been affected by an adverse reaction to prescription medication changing his personality. He was however still involved with the design of ASP cars, helping to design the Targa-style rollbar seen on the later cars. Rory Thompson followed him in 2020 bringing production of ASP sportscars to an end at least with one of the original founders at the helm.

== Models ==
=== Bacchus ===
The Bacchus represented the first original car from the Alpha Street factory. Named after the Greek god of wine these Lotus 7 inspired Clubman cars were powered by a variety of engines with a total of six cars completed under this name.

=== ASP 320 ===
The ASP 320 was born out of the previous Bacchus series of cars. Initially referred to as the Bacchus Mk 4 the car was renamed twice, once as the Shrike and then the ASP 320A. 320s continued to be made right up until the end of the company making it all the way to a G spec car with modern running gear in the traditional ASP 320 bodywork.

=== ASP 330 ===
The ASP 330 represented a change in ASP by branching out into open wheeler formula cars. Appearing in October 1972 in the hands of Bob Wilkin Four cars were built in period, three Formula 3's and one Formula 2.

• #25 Bob Wilkins

• #26 Doug Trengove

• #27 Chris Milton (factory supported car)

• #28 John Harvey

=== ASP 340 ===
==== 340A ====
The 340A, otherwise known as the Potts lightweight, was based on a 320B race chassis but shortened and lightened. campaigned by Doug Potts in period this car was later converted to road spec by ASP employee Colin Reilly.

==== 340B ====
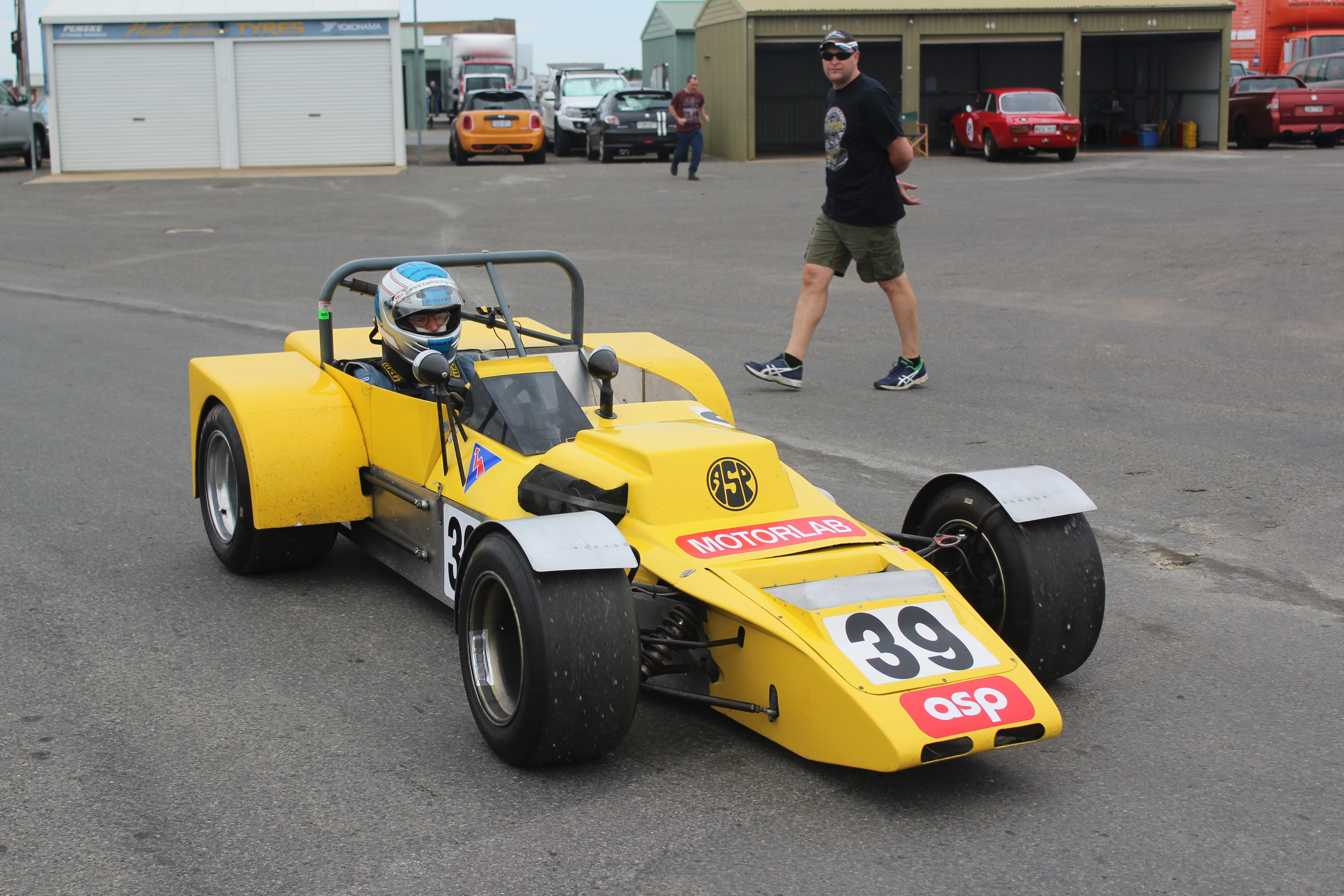
Jim Doig in his ASP 340B in the Paddock Area at Mallala Motor Sport Park

The new for 1972 340B was a new dedicated race chassis very different from its predecessors from the Alpha Street factory. Two cars of this type were produced in 1973 original owners and chassis numbers are as follows.

- #23 J Doig: Toyota Celica 1600
- #24 D Wallace: Ford 1500

Chassis #23, still owned and raced by Jim Doig, is a well known car in its home state of South Australia and beyond. It has been in constant use since new and has participated in more than 1,000 races to date.

Chassis #24 however has since been converted to road use.

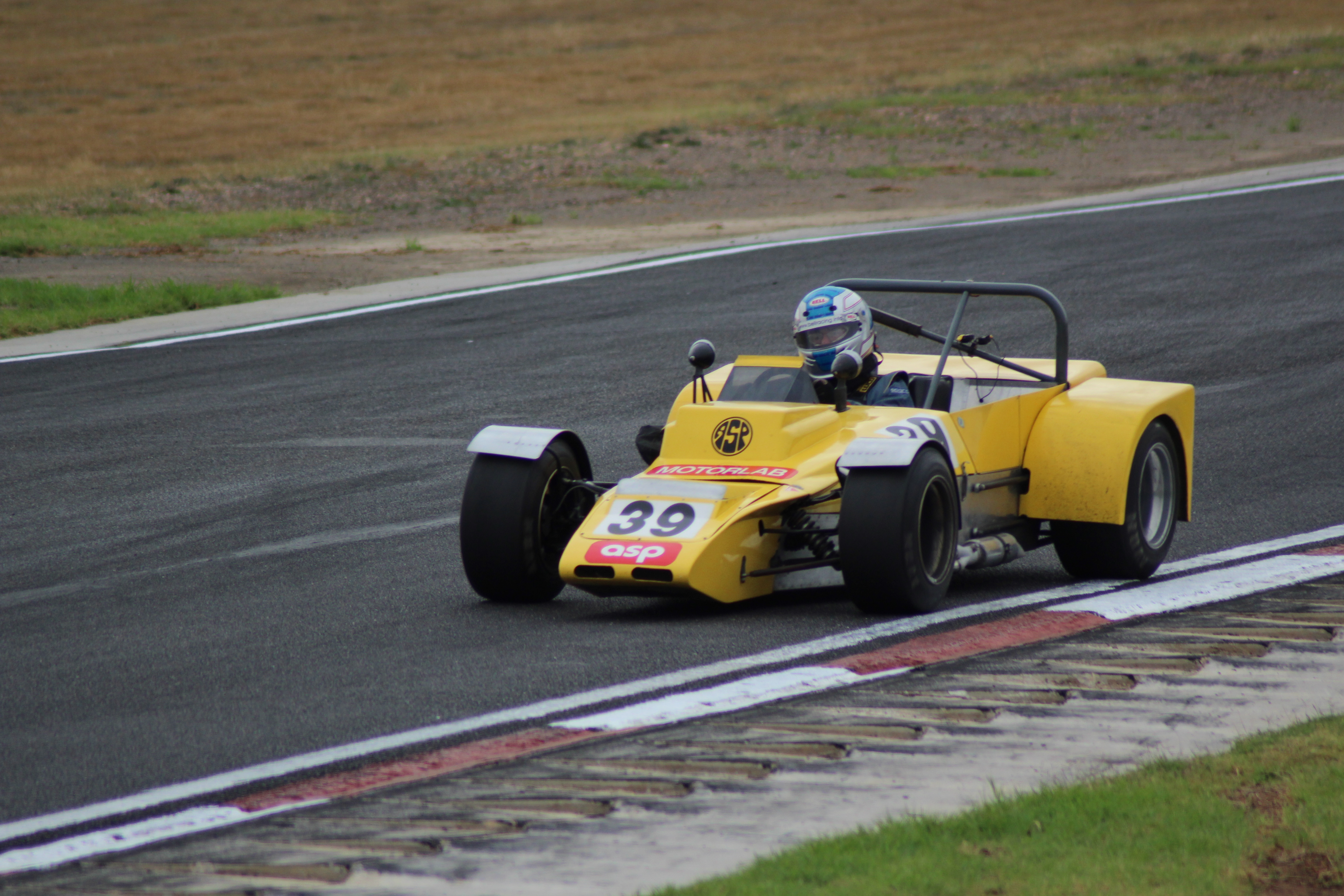

==== 340C ====
Guy Chick in his very original ASP 340C enterning turn 1 at Mallala in 2021

The 340C further developed the ideas introduced in the 340B in a dedicated lightweight racing chassis. In all six cars were built all to Clubman sports 1300 regulations with 1300cc engines. the original owners, car chassis numbers and engines are as follows The car owned by Alby Middleton was driven by Victorian racer Brique Reed and made its debut on the 31/3/1974 at Adelaide international raceway.

- #29 Alby Middleton: Datsun A12
- #30 David Mc Bean: Toyota 3K
- #31 David Walsh: Toyota 3K
- #32 Ken Durward: Datsun A12
- #33 John Blanden: Datsun A12
- #34 Jim Bidstrup: Toyota 3K

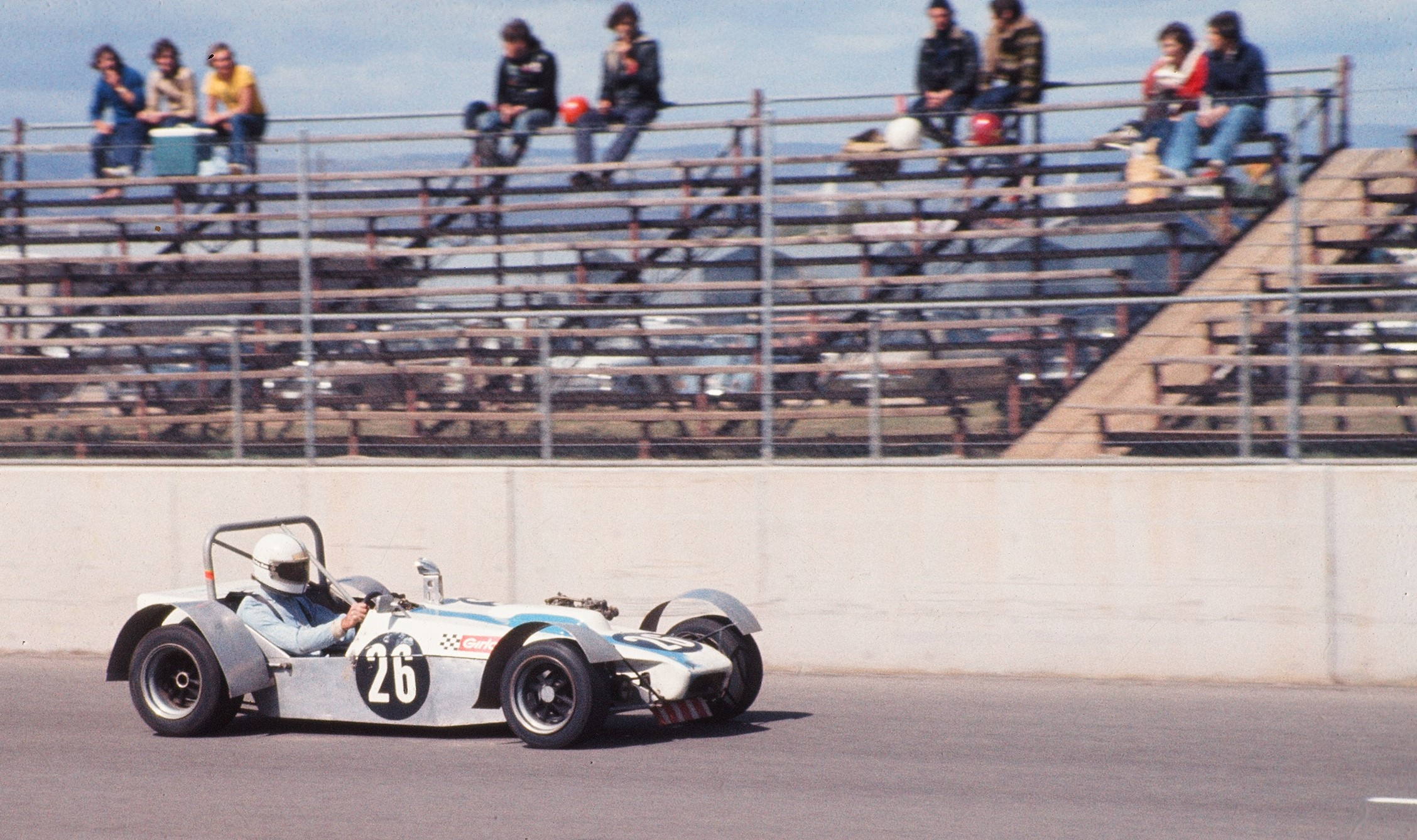
Ken Durward on the pit straight at Adelaide International Raceway in his 340C

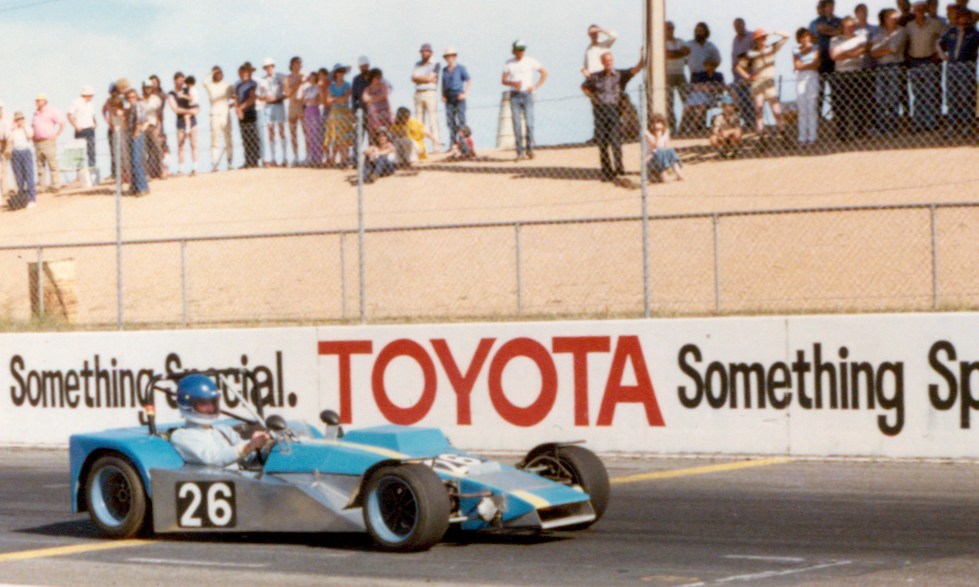
Ken Durward in a developed version of his 340C leaving the line at Adelaide International Raceway

These cars were built using 19x1.2 square steel tube nickel bronze welded to create a very light dedicated racing chassis with a short wheelbase. Front suspension was by unequal length non-parallel wishbones with externally mounted coilover shock absorbers. The rear suspension used a Morris live axle located by an A frame at the bottom which provided both fore-and-aft and lateral location while two short arms were used at the top. More than one car was later updated in period to longer wheelbase and four long arms and a Panhard rod for rear axle location.

=== ASP 350 ===
The ASP 350 was an attempt at building a new design of sports car by Rory Thompson based on readily available running gear. this car featured Holden commodore engine and drivetrain.

== Known ASP racing Chassis Histories ==
The following table documents known racing chassis numbers for Alpha Sports Productions (ASP) cars, including original owners, engines, and subsequent owners where known. This list reflects data compiled from long-term ASP owners, racers, and enthusiasts with direct access to period documentation and surviving vehicles.

Chassis numbers recorded by Alpha Sports Productions
Chassis	Model	Original owner	Original engine	Notes
1	Bacchus Mk1	B. Hanson	N/A	Sold as a chassis only; its later history was recorded as unknown.
2	Bacchus Mk2	G. Chapman	MGA 1500	
3	Bacchus Mk2	R. Lewis	Peugeot 1700	MG TC gearbox.
4	Bacchus Mk2	D. Baillie	Ford four-cylinder	The later Bacchus page lists a Ford engine; an earlier ASP history gives an Austin A40.
5	Bacchus Mk2	R. Dwyer	BMC D-series 1600	
6	Bacchus Mk2	G. Green	Austin A40	
7	Bacchus Mk3	R. Thompson	BMC 998 cc	The ASP site states that the chassis was destroyed by the factory after failing quality control.
7	ASP 320A	P. Hannon		The ASP site separately identifies the original ASP 320A as chassis 7, despite also assigning number 7 to the destroyed Bacchus Mk3.
8	ASP 320B	G. Lewis / R. Butcher	Toyota 3K 1100	The ASP 320B record specifies chassis numbers 8–10 and 14. The individual owner numbers on the same record are displaced by one.
9	ASP 320B	D. Hosking	Toyota 3K 1100	
10	ASP 320B	F. Giles	Toyota 3K 1100	The owner list on the ASP record incorrectly gives chassis 11; the model-level chassis range identifies the car as chassis 10.
11	ASP 320C	A. Hastings	Toyota 3K Aram 1300	Road chassis.
12	ASP 320C	R. White		Road chassis.
13	ASP 320C	J. Murray		Road chassis.
14	ASP 320B	A. Middleton	Toyota 3K 1100	The owner list on the ASP record incorrectly gives chassis 15; the model-level chassis range identifies the car as chassis 14.
15	ASP 320C	B. Harding		
16	ASP 320C	T. Hosking		
17	ASP 320C	R. Tilley		
18	ASP 320C	D. Dixon		
19	ASP 320C	R. Pagliaro		The ASP record states that chassis 19 was later crashed and rebuilt by R. Thompson.
20	ASP 320C	B. Trenorden		
21	ASP 320D	R. Thompson	Datsun 1200	Described by ASP as the "simple chassis".
22	ASP 340A	D. Potts	Mitsubishi Galant 1400	Also known as the "Potts lightweight".
23	ASP 340B	J. Doig	Toyota Celica 1600	
24	ASP 340B	D. Wallace	Ford 1500	
25	ASP 330	R. Wilkins	Ford 1300	Subsequently associated with R. Butcher and J. Scotcher.
26	ASP 330	D. Trengove	Ford 1500	
27	ASP 330	C. Milton	Ford 1300	Factory car.
28	ASP 330	J. Harvey	Toyota 1300	Subsequently associated with D. Hahn, D. Robins, R. Thompson and J. Thompson.
29	ASP 340C	A. Middleton	Datsun A12 1298	
30	ASP 340C	D. McBean	Toyota 3K	
31	ASP 340C	D. Walsh	Toyota 3K	
32	ASP 340C	K. Durward	Datsun A12 1298	
33	ASP 340C	J. Blanden	Datsun A12 1298	
34	ASP 340C	J. Bidstrup	Toyota 3K	
35	ASP 320E	R. Thompson	Toyota 4A-GE	
36	ASP 320F	K. Riddle		Later associated with D. Sprod.
39	ASP 320G	B. Finch	Toyota 4A-GE 20-valve Silver Top	
44	ASP 320G	B. Finch		Second ASP 320G recorded for B. Finch.
47	ASP 320G	R. Gibb	Toyota 4A-GE 20-valve Black Top	
49	ASP 320G	R. Clarke	Toyota 4A-GE 20-valve Silver Top	
52	ASP Clubman		Toyota 4A-GE 20-valve Black Top	Shown on the ASP site under construction; owner and exact subtype have not been established.
53	ASP 320G	B. Schultz		
54	ASP 330 F2	C. Hoffman	Alfa Romeo twin-cam 1600	One of two later ASP 330s built by clients with factory assistance.
55	ASP 330	P. Hannell		Later client-built ASP 330 with factory assistance; engine listed by ASP as "tba".
59	ASP 320H	J. Thompson	Toyota 2ZZ-GE 1.8	

== See also ==
- List of automobile manufacturers
- List of car brands
