= Lotus-Ford Twin Cam =

Twin Cam
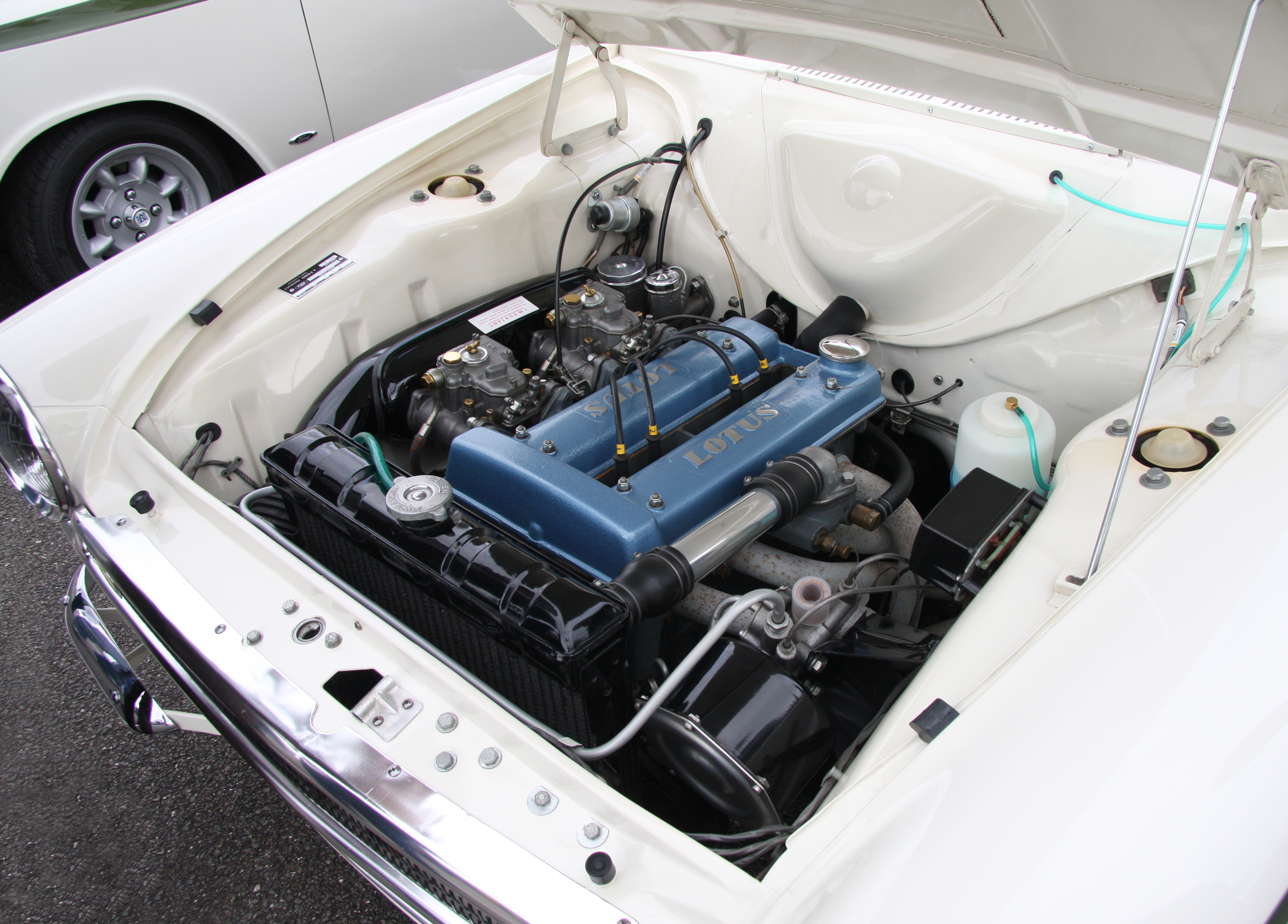

Overview
- Manufacturer: Lotus Cars
- Also called: Lotus TwinCam, Cosworth TA
- Production: 1962–1975

Layout
- Configuration: Naturally aspirated I4
- Displacement: 1.5 L (1,498 cc; 91.4 cu in); 1.6 L (1,557 cc; 95.0 cu in); 1.6 L (1,594 cc; 97.3 cu in)
- Cylinder bore: 80.96 mm (3 3/16 in); 82.55 mm (3 1/4 in); 83.5 mm (3.29 in)
- Piston stroke: 72 3/4 mm (2.86 in)
- Cylinder block material: Cast iron (Ford 116E)
- Cylinder head material: Aluminium
- Valvetrain: Chain driven DOHC, 2 valves per cylinder
- Compression ratio: 9.5:1, 9.8:1, 10.5:1

Combustion
- Fuel system: Dell'Orto, Weber or Stromberg carburettors
- Fuel type: Petrol
- Oil system: Wet sump, Dry sump
- Cooling system: Water-cooled

Output
- Power output: 100 bhp (74.6 kW) (1500); 105 bhp (78.3 kW) (1600); 115 bhp (85.8 kW) (S/E); 126 bhp (94.0 kW) (Big Valve)
- Torque output: 102–113 lb⋅ft (138–153 N⋅m)

Chronology
- Successor: Lotus 907

The Lotus-Ford Twin Cam is an inline-four petrol engine developed by Lotus for the 1962 Lotus Elan. A few early examples displaced 1.5 litres, but the majority were 1.55-litre (1557cc) engines. It used a Ford "Kent" iron cylinder block and a new aluminium cylinder head with dual overhead camshafts. The Twin Cam was used in a variety of vehicles until Lotus stopped production in 1973. It was succeeded by the Lotus 907 engine.

== History ==
For the Lotus Elan, Lotus founder Colin Chapman wanted to find a less expensive engine than the costly all-alloy Coventry Climax FWE used in the original Lotus Elite. He felt that basing his new power-plant on an engine built in large volumes would keep costs down.

Chapman initially chose the Ford Kent inline-four used in the Ford Anglia as the basis of this new engine. The original Kent displaced 1.0 L (997 cc; 60.8 cu in) and had a cast iron block produced with Ford's thin-wall casting process, resulting in a relatively light part. While the original block only provided three main bearings for the crankshaft, the oversquare design kept piston speeds down and gave room for larger valves in the new cylinder head. When the larger 1.3 L (1,339 cc; 81.7 cu in) Kent engine for the Ford Consul Classic 109E was released, it became the platform for most of the development of the new Lotus engine.

Engine designer Harry Mundy had been working on two projects for Jean Daninos' Facel S.A. One design was an all-new quad-cam V6 displacing under 3.0 litres. The other was a new DOHC cylinder head to replace the failure-prone original on the 1.6-litre inline four Pont-à-Mousson engine used in the Facellia. Financial problems at Facel kept either engine from reaching production, but when Chapman found out about the smaller engine he commissioned Mundy to adapt the Facellia design to the Ford engine block. Mundy's design for Lotus comprised an aluminium cylinder head and an aluminium front cover and its back plate assembly containing the water pump and the camshaft drive chain.

After the initial design was finished, outside consultant Richard Ansdale produced detailed drawings of the new cylinder head. Lotus employee Steve Sanville headed the production engineering team that included Mike Costin, Neil Francis and Bob Dance. Harry Weslake conducted a flow bench analysis on the early head. Early Twin Cam prototypes had problems at the head joint. Keith Duckworth, who had already left Lotus for Cosworth Engineering, was brought back to look at the new cylinder head. Duckworth made several design changes, reshaping the ports and adding structure to the head.

The first Lotus Twin Cam engine was fired up on a test bench on October 10, 1961. This engine broke a crankshaft during testing; a failure blamed on the three main-bearing block. The first test vehicle to receive a Twin Cam was a left hand drive Ford Anglia, and the engine was installed on 18 January 1962. This Anglia is reported to have overtaken a Jaguar at well over 100 mph (161 km/h) in the hands of Jim Clark on his way home to Scotland from Goodwood.

In May 1962 Ford announced the 1498cc Kent engine. This engine first appeared in the Consul Classic/Capri 116E in August 1962, and then in the Cortina 1500 Super in January 1963. The engine had a taller deck height than the earlier Kent engines, and with a bore and stroke of 3 3/16 in × 2.864 in (80.96 mm × 72.75 mm), capacity was 1.5 L (1,498 cc; 91.4 cu in). Its crankshaft was carried in five main bearings. Power output was about 60 bhp (45 kW) at 4600 rpm. As soon as a block could be obtained work began to convert the Lotus cylinder head to the five-bearing, 1498 cc block. Duckworth assembled the first two production-specification engines, one of which powered a Lotus 23 on its racing debut at the Nürburgring. After building a limited number of 1.5 L Twin Cams, the bore was increased to 82.55 mm (3 1/4 in), raising the capacity to 1.56 L.

Assembly of the first 50 engines was contracted out to J.A.Prestwich. Prestwich also machined the raw cylinder head castings (cast by William Mills) on these early twin cam engines.

The Twin Cam had its official debut at the Earls Court Motor Show in October 1962. Total production of the engine was approximately 34,000 units, in 24 different varieties.

=== Engine name ===
Chapman named the engine the "Lotus Twin-Cam" at its introduction in 1962 and Lotus continued to use that name. When production switched from the Cortina-Lotus to the Ford Cortina Mark II-based Cortina Twin Cam in 1967, Ford began to call the engine the "Lotus-Ford Twin Cam". The engine is also known informally as the "Lotus TC" or the "Twink".

=== Successors ===
The Lotus 900 series of engines replaced the Twin Cam in Lotus' cars after 1973; Lotus ended production of the Twin Cam in 1975.

In 1977 it was announced that Caterham Cars had taken over the rights to build and develop the Twin Cam engine, using Ford blocks. Caterham also had the big-valve version (with twin Dell'Orto carburettors) emissions tested and obtained a certificate of compliance. Caterham had engine tuners Vegantune build them engines using reconditioned twin cam heads to supply the very important Japanese market. Caterham also had Vegantune develop a version of the Twin Cam using Ford's 1598-cc block (rather than basing it on the earlier 1498 cc unit) with their own, improved DOHC cylinder head. Called the VTA, this variant launched in 1983. Supplied to Caterham Cars as a replacement for the Twin Cam in the Caterham Seven, the VTA featured belt-driven cams. The engine used the later Crossflow block and displaced 1.6 or 1.7 litres. Power was 140 to 160 hp (104 to 119 kW). Around 40 units were supplied to Caterham but quality control was very uneven and Caterham eventually switched over to the Cosworth BDR or the single-cam 1700 Supersprint.

== Technical ==
The Twin Cam's displacement is usually rounded up to 1,558 cc (1.6 L). Its bore and stroke are 82.55 mm × 72.75 mm (3 1/4 in × 2.864 in) respectively, for an actual displacement of 1,557.46 cc (95.04 cu in). This allowed the Twin Cam to be over-bored by up to 1 mm (0.04 in) and still remain below the 1600 cc class limit permitted by FIA regulations. The over-bore limit of 1 mm is also stated in the FIA Homologation papers with the resultant displacement of 1,595 cc (83.55 mm x 72.75 mm, 1,595.42 cc).

The cylinder head has hemispherical combustion chambers (correct statement would have been "pear shaped chambers" since this has implications on the angle of the valves). Valve sizes are 1.53 in (39 mm) diameter inlet and 1.325 in (33.7 mm) diameter exhaust on all engines except the later "Big Valve" engines. The valve stem axis is inclined 27° from vertical on both intake and exhaust. Initial cam timing was 15/53/53/15 with the same cam profile as the ET418 Coventry Climax FWE cam, which resulted in 100 bhp (75 kW; 101 PS) at 5700 rpm for the 1,498cc engine with a 9.5:1 compression ratio. 1,557cc production engines had 22/62/62/22 cam timing with 0.349 in (8.9 mm) lift (developed by Cosworth as 'CPL1' -Cosworth Production Lotus) with 9.8:1 compression ratio.

The water pump used the engine front cover as its housing, making water pump replacement difficult. The intake manifold was a series of short tubular stubs cast as an integral part of the cylinder head. The heads for 175CD Zenith-Stromberg carburettor had two siamesed stubs (part of the head casting), making them not interchangeable with earlier heads using Dell'Orto DHLA40 or 40DCOE Weber carburetors, whose intake was four individual tubes (also part of the head casting). Exhaust gases were handled either by a cast-iron manifold or a fabricated tubular header, depending on application.

The original in-block camshaft was retained and, as in the original 116E, drove the side-mounted distributor and nearby external oil pump/filter assembly, minimizing modifications to the mass-produced iron block. The original cam along with the DOHC cam sprockets were driven by a long front-mounted, single-row 3/8-inch (9.5 mm) Renold roller timing chain.

Early Lotus blocks were simply standard Ford production line items selected for having the thickest cylinder walls, and were identified by an "A" stamped into the timing cover mating face. Later blocks were specially cast with Twin Cam production in mind and identified by an "L" cast into the block under the engine mount. Twin Cam blocks came from 6 basic casting versions. Prior to 1968 the first 4 digits were often ground off the block and "3020" was stamped in its place.

1962 to 1967

The 116E-6015 block with round main bearing caps and 4 bolt crankshaft
The 120E-6015 block with round main bearing caps and 4 bolt crankshaft

1967-1975

The 3020-6015 block with round main bearing caps and 6 bolt crankshaft
The 681F-6015 block with round main bearing caps and 6 bolt crankshaft
The 681F-6015 block with square main bearing caps and 6 bolt crankshaft
The 701M-6015 block with square main bearing caps and 6 bolt crankshaft

Early engines used a crankshaft, connecting rods and pistons from Lotus. The crank was cast iron, and the pistons had a slight crown and were fly-cut to clear the valves. A revised Twin Cam was released in 1966. In this version the fly-cuts were smaller, and the con-rods were Ford 125E parts. The flywheel was also attached to the crankshaft by six bolts, an increase of two over the previous model. The Twin Cam had a problem with oil surge, and the attachment of the starter motor was subject to flexing when trying to spin the high-compression engine.

Early engines had the word "Lotus" in script cast in raised letters on the cam cover above each camshaft. Later engines had a raised border across the front of the cam cover with the word "Lotus" cast in raised text set within it. The portion of the cover over the cams was smooth.

=== Special Equipment tune ===
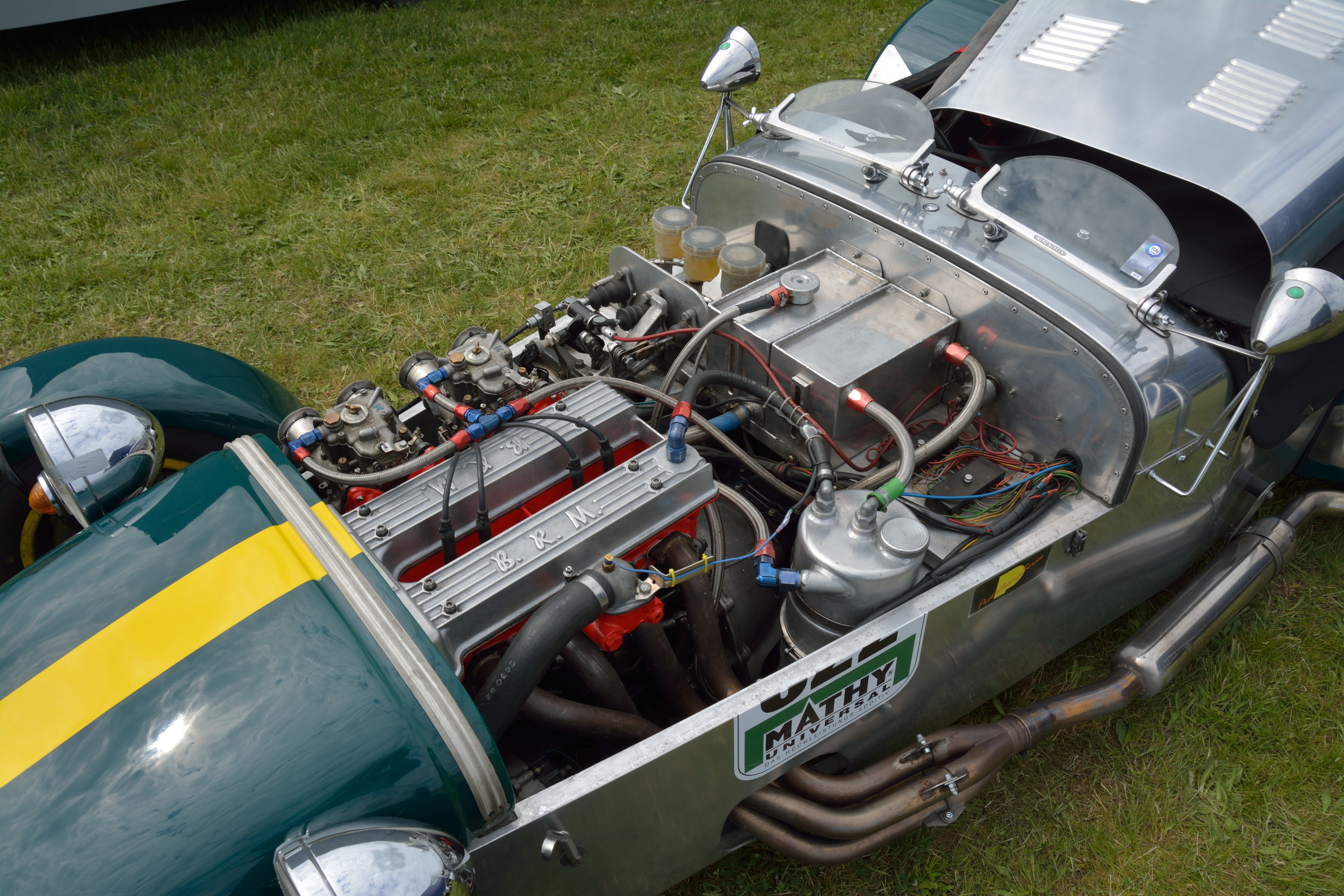
BRM cam cover

Lotus began to offer more highly tuned Special Equipment engines as options in their cars. The parts for these engines could also be bought from Lotus Components Ltd. At first, these were Cosworth developed and assembled engines with cast cranks and Cosworth name plates on the cam cover. Duckworth was responsible for the design of the Special Equipment cams. Cosworth later distanced themselves from this business, and Lotus started selling equivalents. BRM Phase I received BRM camshafts and high compression cast pistons, and BRM Phase II added Mahle forged pistons, BRM forged conrods, small-end bushes and big-end bolts to the Phase I. When offered in assembled form, these engines carried a BRM name plate on a specially cast 'BRM' cam cover, but the actual assembly of these high performance 'BRM' road engines was carried out by the BRM Engine Development Division of Rubery Owen & Co. Ltd., an affiliated company of BRM through its ownership, not by BRM itself. The Special Equipment ('S/E') engines had 26/66/66/26 cam timing.

Originally applied to tuned Elans and Lotus Cortinas, the term "Special Equipment" was later used by Lotus to designate those Series 2 and later Elans with higher output motors, and are referred to as Elan S/Es.

==== SSE ====
In 1968 Sanville began building a series of Twin Cams using a new camshaft called the Super Special Equipment cam, or D-Type, that was based on the Coventry Climax FWA 3060 cam. Heads used in SSE engines were shaved by 0.04 in (1.0 mm), boosting the compression ratio to 10.3:1. The ignition was advanced slightly, and larger chokes and different jets were fitted to the Weber carburettors. Power was estimated to be 124–126 bhp (92–94 kW), fully three years prior to the release of the Big Valve engine. Some SSE engines are said to have left the factory in Super Weber S/E Elans.

=== Big Valve engine ===
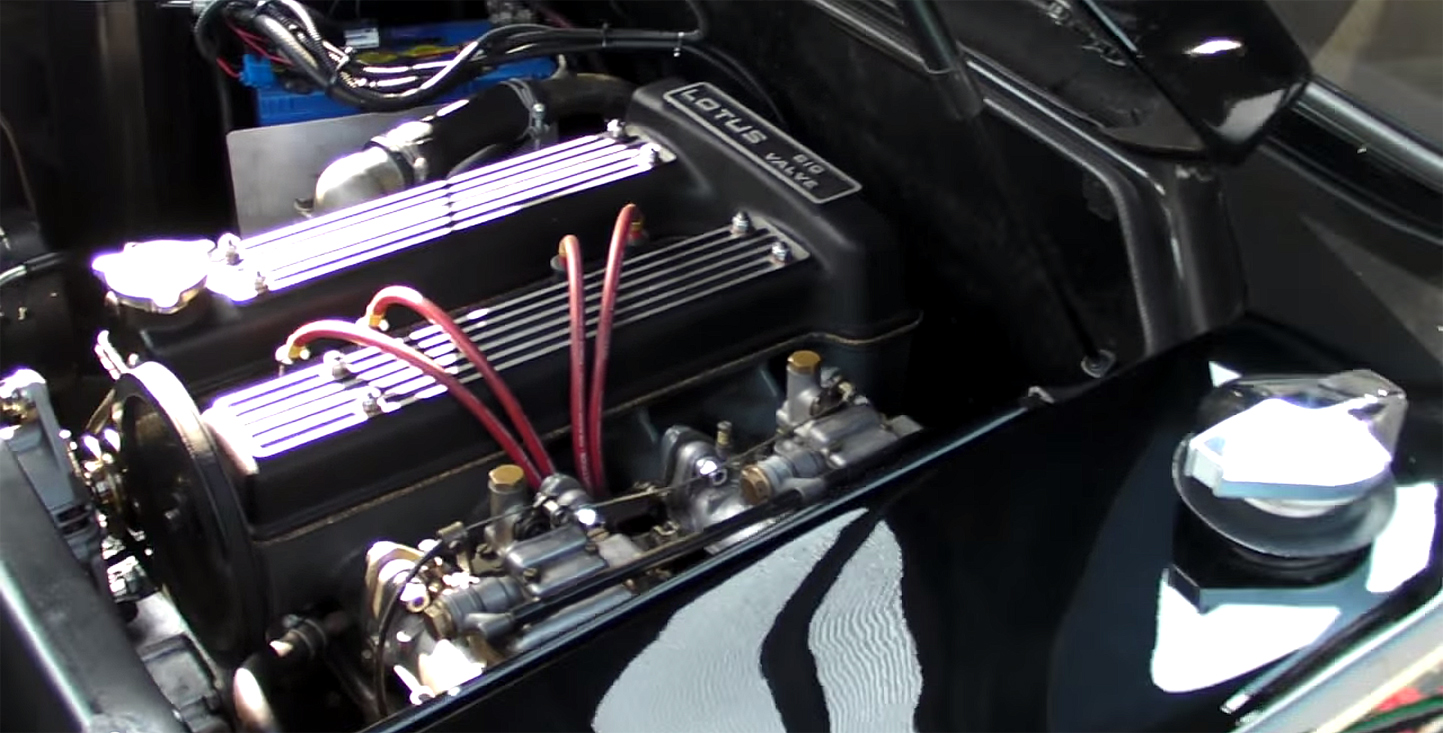
Big Valve engine

The Big Valve Twin Cam was a project of Lotus' Engineering Director Tony Rudd. Rudd reduced the deck height by 0.04 in (1.0 mm) to raise the compression ratio to 10.5:1, increased the diameter of the inlet valves to 1.565 in (39.8 mm), modified the inlet runners' shape for the larger valves and installed Super Special Equipment D-type camshafts. Power was increased 20% over the regular engine's 105 to 126 hp (78.3 to 94.0 kW). Big Valve engines were offered in the Elan Sprint, Elan +2 130, and Lotus Europa Twin Cam Special models. Cam covers for Big Valve engines had the words "Lotus" and "Big Valve" cast in raised letters across the front of the cam cover. The portion of the cover over the camshafts had raised ribs cast in.

Big Valve engines had the same 26/66/66/26 timing as the S/E engines but with 0.360 in (9.1 mm) lift. "Special" spec engines had 26/66/66/26 timing with 0.362 in (9.2 mm) lift.

The larger inlet valves are compatible with earlier non Big Valve cylinder heads with very little modification, however increasing intake valve size by itself will not produce a measurable increase in power. The majority of the power gain comes from modifying the size and shape of the intake runners (porting) and fitting uprated camshafts.

== Engine / Application chart ==
Engine model	Bore	Stroke	Displacement	Power^{1}	Torque	Year(s)	Applications
1500	80.96 mm (3 3/16 in)	72.75 mm (2.864 in)	1.5 L (1,498 cc; 91.4 cu in)	100 bhp (75 kW) at 5700 rpm	102 lb⋅ft (138 N⋅m) at 4500 rpm	1962	Elan 1500
1600	82.55 mm (3 1/4 in)	72.75 mm (2.864 in)	1.6 L (1,558 cc; 95.1 cu in)	105 bhp (78 kW) at 5500 rpm	108 lb⋅ft (146 N⋅m) at 4000 rpm	1962-1964	Elan 1600
1600	82.55 mm (3 1/4 in)	72.75 mm (2.864 in)	1.6 L (1,558 cc; 95.1 cu in)	105 bhp (78 kW) at 5500 rpm	108 lb⋅ft (146 N⋅m) at 4000 rpm	1964-1965	Elan S2
1600	82.55 mm (3 1/4 in)	72.75 mm (2.864 in)	1.6 L (1,558 cc; 95.1 cu in)	105 bhp (78 kW) at 5500 rpm	108 lb⋅ft (146 N⋅m) at 4000 rpm	1965-1968	Elan S3
1600	82.55 mm (3 1/4 in)	72.75 mm (2.864 in)	1.6 L (1,558 cc; 95.1 cu in)	105 bhp (78 kW) at 5500 rpm	108 lb⋅ft (146 N⋅m) at 4000 rpm	1968-1971	Elan S4
1600	82.55 mm (3 1/4 in)	72.75 mm (2.864 in)	1.6 L (1,558 cc; 95.1 cu in)	105 bhp (78 kW) at 5500 rpm	108 lb⋅ft (146 N⋅m) at 4000 rpm	1963-1964	Lotus Cortina
1600	82.55 mm (3 1/4 in)	72.75 mm (2.864 in)	1.6 L (1,558 cc; 95.1 cu in)	105 bhp (78 kW) at 5500 rpm	108 lb⋅ft (146 N⋅m) at 4000 rpm	1964-1966	Ford Cortina Lotus
1600	82.55 mm (3 1/4 in)	72.75 mm (2.864 in)	1.6 L (1,558 cc; 95.1 cu in)	105 bhp (78 kW) at 5500 rpm	108 lb⋅ft (146 N⋅m) at 4000 rpm	1965-1968	Ginetta G4
1600	82.55 mm (3 1/4 in)	72.75 mm (2.864 in)	1.6 L (1,558 cc; 95.1 cu in)	105 bhp (78 kW) at 5500 rpm	108 lb⋅ft (146 N⋅m) at 4000 rpm	1966-1970	Ford Cortina Twin Cam
1600	82.55 mm (3 1/4 in)	72.75 mm (2.864 in)	1.6 L (1,558 cc; 95.1 cu in)	105 bhp (78 kW) at 5500 rpm	108 lb⋅ft (146 N⋅m) at 4000 rpm	1968-1971	Ford Escort Twin Cam
1600	82.55 mm (3 1/4 in)	72.75 mm (2.864 in)	1.6 L (1,558 cc; 95.1 cu in)	105 bhp (78 kW) at 5500 rpm	108 lb⋅ft (146 N⋅m) at 4000 rpm	1971-1972	Europa Twin Cam
1600	82.55 mm (3 1/4 in)	72.75 mm (2.864 in)	1.6 L (1,558 cc; 95.1 cu in)	105 bhp (78 kW) at 5500 rpm	108 lb⋅ft (146 N⋅m) at 4000 rpm	1973	Seven Twin Cam
1600	82.55 mm (3 1/4 in)	72.75 mm (2.864 in)	1.6 L (1,558 cc; 95.1 cu in)	105 bhp (78 kW) at 5500 rpm	108 lb⋅ft (146 N⋅m) at 4000 rpm	1973-1974	Caterham 7
Special Equipment	82.55 mm (3 1/4 in)	72.75 mm (2.864 in)	1.6 L (1,558 cc; 95.1 cu in)	115 bhp (86 kW) at 6250 rpm	108 lb⋅ft (146 N⋅m) at 5000 rpm	1964–1965	Elan S2 S/E
Special Equipment	82.55 mm (3 1/4 in)	72.75 mm (2.864 in)	1.6 L (1,558 cc; 95.1 cu in)	115 bhp (86 kW) at 6250 rpm	108 lb⋅ft (146 N⋅m) at 5000 rpm	1965–1968	Elan S3 S/E
Special Equipment	82.55 mm (3 1/4 in)	72.75 mm (2.864 in)	1.6 L (1,558 cc; 95.1 cu in)	115 bhp (86 kW) at 6250 rpm	108 lb⋅ft (146 N⋅m) at 5000 rpm	1968–1970	Elan S4 S/E
Special Equipment	82.55 mm (3 1/4 in)	72.75 mm (2.864 in)	1.6 L (1,558 cc; 95.1 cu in)	118 bhp (88 kW) at 6000 rpm	112 lb⋅ft (152 N⋅m) at 4600 rpm	1970–1971	Late Elan S4 S/E
Special Equipment	82.55 mm (3 1/4 in)	72.75 mm (2.864 in)	1.6 L (1,558 cc; 95.1 cu in)	118 bhp (88 kW) at 6000 rpm	112 lb⋅ft (152 N⋅m) at 4600 rpm	1967–1972	Elan +2, +2S
Big Valve	82.55 mm (3 1/4 in)	72.75 mm (2.864 in)	1.6 L (1,558 cc; 95.1 cu in)	126 bhp (94 kW) at 6500 rpm	113 lb⋅ft (153 N⋅m) at 5500 rpm	1971–1974	Elan Sprint
Big Valve	82.55 mm (3 1/4 in)	72.75 mm (2.864 in)	1.6 L (1,558 cc; 95.1 cu in)	126 bhp (94 kW) at 6500 rpm	113 lb⋅ft (153 N⋅m) at 5500 rpm	1972-1975	Europa Twin Cam Special
Big Valve	82.55 mm (3 1/4 in)	72.75 mm (2.864 in)	1.6 L (1,558 cc; 95.1 cu in)	126 bhp (94 kW) at 6500 rpm	113 lb⋅ft (153 N⋅m) at 5500 rpm	1972-1975	Elan +2S 130, +2S 130/5

== Controversies ==
Different sources report different, sometimes conflicting information with regard to naming, power outputs, and other items. Some of these are listed below.

1. Some sources distinguish between engines built prior to 1966 and those built after by calling the earlier ones Mark 1 and the later Mark 2. Another source states that these names are not officially recognized, and that the different versions are properly differentiated by calling versions with numbers up to 7799 "rope-seal" engines, and the later ones "lip-seal" engines. The same source says that there is no such thing as an early or late cylinder head.
2. The generally accepted power ratings for the Twin Cam are 105 hp (78 kW) for the standard engine, 115 hp (86 kW) for the S/E, and 126 for the Big Valve. One source says that early power outputs were overstated, and that this was "corrected" in later manuals. True outputs are claimed to be 90 hp (67 kW) at 5500 rpm for a standard 1600, 93 hp (69 kW) at 6000 rpm for early S/E, and 95 hp (71 kW) at 6250 rpm for late S/E, with Big Valve output still estimated to have been 126 hp (94 kW) at 6500 rpm. Still another source states that the "correction" is itself a typographical error, and that no Twin Cam ever gave less than 103 hp (77 kW).
3. While the Big Valve engine, with an output of 126 hp (94 kW), is generally agreed to be the most powerful factory Twin Cam, some sources ask whether it was more a sales gimmick than a significant enhancement to the engine. While Rudd achieved his stated goal of a 20% increase in power when compared to the standard Twin Cam's 105 hp (78 kW), it was less than 10% more powerful than an S/E, and had just one more horsepower than the SSE. The Big Valve is said to have lacked the smoothness of other Twin Cams, with peak power coming on at much higher engine speeds than even the SSE. When an Elan Sprint with a Big Valve engine was tested by Motor magazine in March 1971, it was found to be 0.3 seconds slower to 100 mph (161 km/h) than an S/E with Stromberg carburettors tested by the same magazine in April 1970. In either case, the Big Valve engine is agreed to have been a sales success.
4. Several sources say that 22 of the 1.5 L engines made their way into road-going "Elan 1500" models, all of which were subsequently recalled and upgraded to 1.6-litre engines. They may also report that the 1.5 Ls were used in various Lotus 20B, 22, 23, and 26R cars as well as in Elan and Lotus Cortina prototypes. Another source states that only 11 such engines were ever built, and that these were used in Lotus 23s and Elans for development work only.

== Cosworth developments ==
Cosworth founders Keith Duckworth and Mike Costin were both former employees of Lotus. Their new company developed the Twin Cam for competition use under Cosworth Project Code TA, with specific versions designated with an 'Mk.' prefix. One of the initial batch became the experimental Cosworth Mk.X in 1962. This was followed in 1963 by the dry-sump Mk.XII with racing camshafts designated the 'CPL2' (26/66/66/26) and high compression Cosworth pistons, used actively by Team Lotus in Lotus 20B, 22, 23 and 23B.

The Mk.XII was developed into the Mk.XIII for Formula racing with the addition of a Cosworth 12-bolt forged steel crankshaft, Cosworth forged conrods, wilder camshafts and 45DCOE Weber carburetors. The use of the original Ford camshaft as jackshaft is abolished and Cosworth-made jackshaft was installed. Although all Mk.XIII was dry-sump requiring externally-driven scavenge/pressure pumps, this bespoke jackshaft retained the oil pump drive cam to keep the interchangeability with the wet-sump Mk.XV. The Mk.XIII became a big seller in 1965 when the SCCA created the Formula B category in America. The dominance of the Mk.XIII in Formula B was nearly absolute against its main rivals the Satta/Hruska-designed Alfa Romeo 105/115 1.6 L (1,570 cc) DOHC unit, and the Alex von Falkenhausen-designed SOHC 1.6 L (1,573 cc) BMW M116 engine. This in turn allowed the now-viable engineering firm to reduce its previous near-total dependence on Lotus. The proliferation of the Mk.XIII triggered the establishment of new European-style racing-engine builders in the US performing rebuilding and maintenance work needed on the Mk.XIII while also contributing to Cosworth's revenue.

Other Cosworth engines based on the Lotus-Ford Twin Cam include the Mk.XV for the Lotus 26R and Lotus Cortina (almost all for Team Lotus and affiliated teams) and the Mk.XVI, a version of the Mk.XIII for the 1.5 Liter Class.

Cosworth designed its own aluminium reverse-flow 2-valve gear-driven SOHC cylinder head for the same Ford 116E block. This head shared many basic design attributes with the Coventry Climax FWE head and was used with a short-stroke forged steel crank for a 1 Liter Formula 2 engine named the SCA in 1964. This was followed by a gear-driven DOHC 4-valve cross-flow aluminium head on the same block with a Mk.XIII forged crank for a new 1.6 Liter Formula 2 engine named the FVA in 1966. This is when Cosworth's involvement in the development of the Lotus TwinCam ended.

=== Cosworth TA ===
Designation	Bore	Stroke	Displacement	Horsepower	Application	Notes
Mk.X	80.96 mm (3 3/16 in)	72 3/4 mm (2.86 in)	1.5 L (1,498 cc; 91.4 cu in)	n/a	Lotus 23	Experimental prototype racing Twin Cam
Mk.XII	83.5 mm (3.29 in)	72 3/4 mm (2.86 in)	1.6 L (1,594 cc; 97.3 cu in)	140 hp (104 kW) at 6500 rpm	Lotus 20B, 22, 23	Dry sump, stock crank and rods
Mk.XIII	83.5 mm (3.29 in)	72 3/4 mm (2.86 in)	1.6 L (1,594 cc; 97.3 cu in)	140–150 hp (104–112 kW) at 6500 rpm	Formula B, Lotus 22, 23B, 23C, Lotus 47	Mk.XII with steel crank and rods, dry sump
Mk.XV	83.5 mm (3.29 in)	72 3/4 mm (2.86 in)	1.6 L (1,594 cc; 97.3 cu in)	130–140 hp (97–104 kW)	Lotus 26R, Lotus Cortina	Wet sump, steel crank and rods
Mk.XVI	80.96 mm (3 3/16 in)	72 3/4 mm (2.86 in)	1.5 L (1,498 cc; 91.4 cu in)	140–150 hp (104–112 kW)	Formula 1 and Australasian open-wheel classes.	Dry sump.

== Motorsports ==
The Twin Cam made its racing debut in May 1962 as a Cosworth Mk.X in a Lotus 23 driven by Jim Clark at the Nürburgring. Clark led the field until being overcome by exhaust fumes.

Twin Cam made several appearances in Formula 1 in the Cosworth Mk.XVI form during the 1 1/2-litre (92 cu in) formula that ran from 1961 to 1965. Its first appearance was at the 1963 South African Grand Prix in a Brabham BT6 driven by David Prophet. The engine appeared in two cars in the 1964 British Grand Prix, one being the Gerard Racing Cooper T73 driven by John Taylor and the other the John Willment Automobiles Brabham BT10. The only recorded finish was ninth place at the 1965 South African Grand Prix, again in the Willment Brabham.

Cosworth Mk.XV powered the Elan 26R of the Willment Team and driver John Miles to 15 seasonal wins and the 1966 Autosport Championship title.

Third-party engine builders continued development after 1966 for the Elan and Cortina as well as for Formula 2, 3 and other classes. Early tuners included Holbay, Vegantune, and Novamotor, joined later by Brian Hart, Richardson, Wilcox and others who focused mainly on the Formula classes.

Roger Barr won the 1968 US Formula B National Championship using a Twin Cam, with numerous modifications made to both it and the Crossle chassis.
