= Elfin 622/623 =

Elfin 622
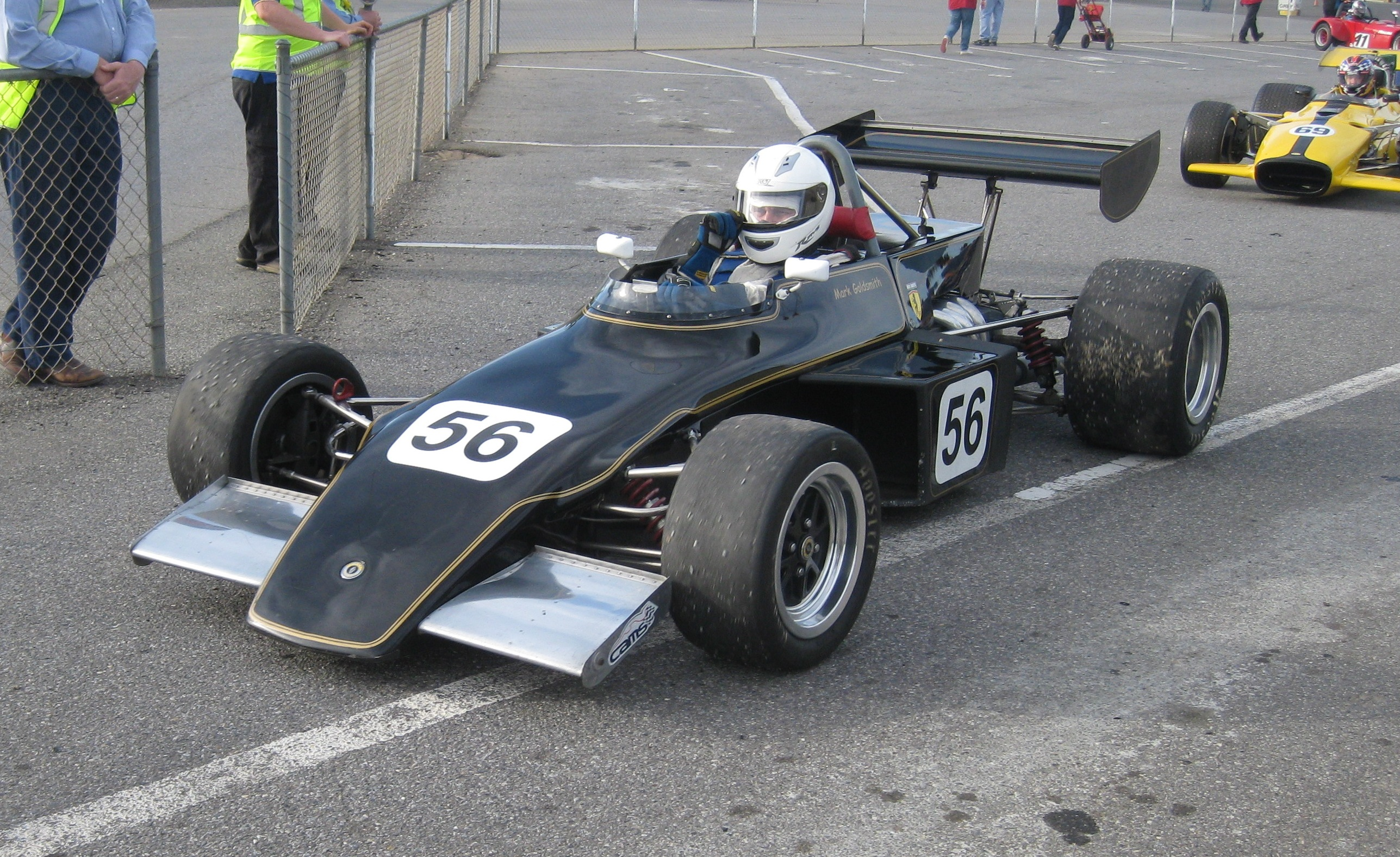
- Elfin 622

Overview
- Manufacturer: Elfin Sports Cars
- Production: 622 : 1972-1974; 6 produced 623 : 1973-1974; 8 produced
- Designer: Garrie Cooper

Body and chassis
- Class: Australian Formula 2 Australian Formula 3

Chronology
- Predecessor: Elfin Type 600
- Successor: Elfin 630

The Elfin 622 is an Australian Formula 2 racing car produced from 1972 to 1974 by Elfin Sports Cars. Elfin also produced a version of this car optimised for Australian Formula 3 called the Elfin 623.

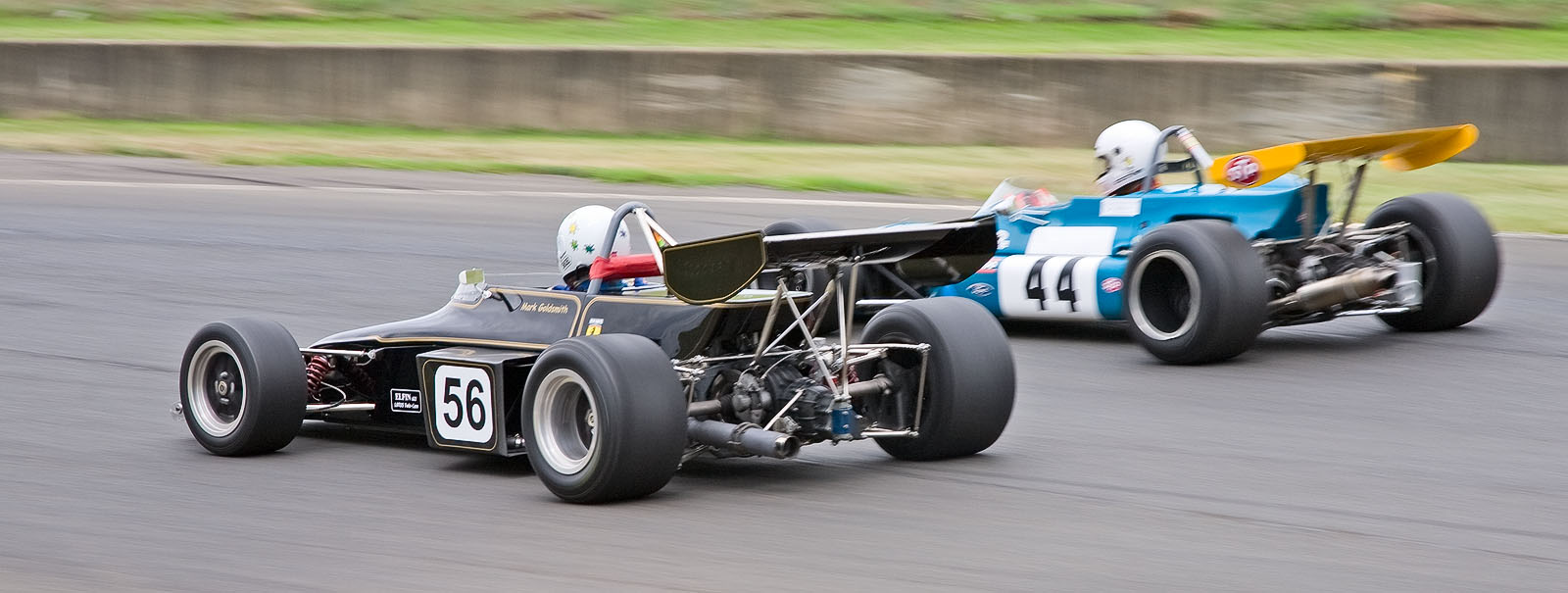
Elfin 622 (foreground)

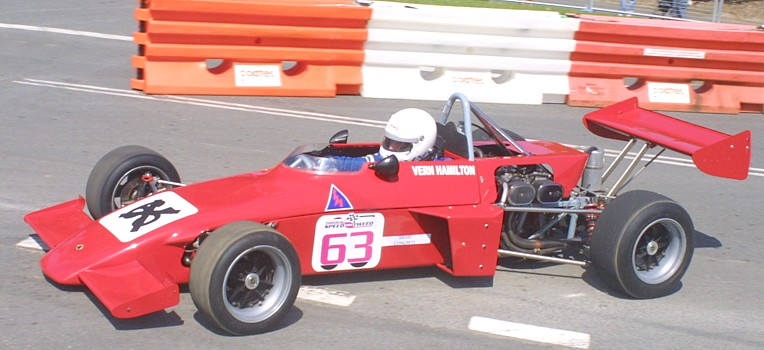
Elfin 623
