= Surfers Paradise International Raceway =

Motor sport facilitity 1966–1987

- Location: Carrara, Queensland, Australia
- Coordinates: 28°0′59″S 153°22′34″E
- Opened: 1966
- Closed: 27 August 1987; 39 years ago
- Major events: Tasman Series (1968, 1970–1975); Australian Touring Car Championship (1969, 1971–1977, 1979–1987); Australian Grand Prix (1975); Australian GT (1982–1985); Australian Drivers' Championship (1966–1969, 1971–1975, 1977)

Full Circuit (1966–1987)
- Length: 3.219 km (2.000 mi)
- Turns: 7
- Race lap record: 1:04.300 ( (Australia) John Bowe, Veskanda C1, 1986, Group A/C)

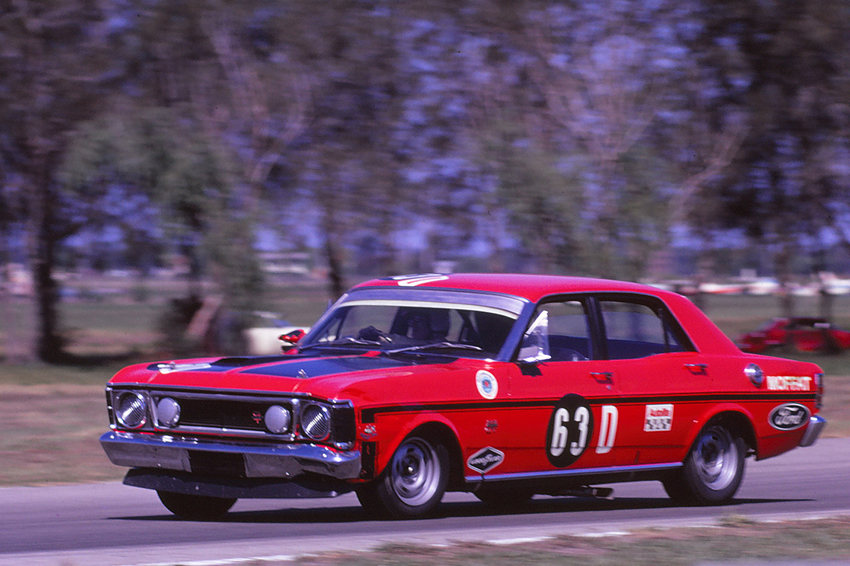
Allan Moffat at Surfers Paradise International Raceway in the works Ford Falcon GTHO Phase II in 1970/71

Surfers Paradise International Raceway was a motor racing complex on the Gold Coast, Queensland, Australia. The 3.219 km (2.000 mi) long circuit was designed and built by Keith Williams, a motor racing enthusiast who also designed and built the Adelaide International Raceway in South Australia in 1972. It was located opposite the Surfers Paradise Ski Gardens at Carrara.

== The circuit ==
Surfers Paradise Raceway included a dragstrip along the main straight (a design later incorporated into the Williams owned Adelaide International Raceway), with a very fast right-hander under the Dunlop Bridge leading to a tight corner that turned the track back to a medium-length straight. Then a fast left hander before rushing into a series of rights and lefts that skirted the only hill on the property (commonly known as Repco Hill). A slow right called that opened up brought the track back to the main straight.

The right hand turn under the Dunlop Bridge was widely considered the fastest and most daunting corner in Australian motorsport until the building of the Chase chicane at the Mount Panorama Circuit in 1987, with many top drivers including Allan Moffat, John Harvey and Tony Edmondson all having crashed there over the years.

Within the circuit lay an airstrip and quarter-mile speedway similar to the one that used to sit within the lower part of the Amaroo Park circuit in Sydney. Drag racing commenced at Easter in 1966, with the June meet, the Winternationals, beginning in 1968. The Winternationals became the largest drag racing meet outside the United States.

Keith Williams sold the raceway in 1984, and the circuit closed at the end of 1987 after 21 years of operation, with the final meeting held on 27 August. The outright lap record of 1:04.3 was set in 1986 and was held by John Bowe driving a Chevrolet powered Veskanda C1 Group A/Group C sports car. In 1987 it was sold by Westmark Corporation for $8.5 million, double what it paid fot it nine months earlier.

The Winternationals moved to Willowbank Raceway in 1988, where the race continues to this day. After years of neglect, it was finally destroyed in 2003. The site has since been redeveloped as Emerald Lakes canal estate.

In 1993, after years of neglect, volunteers and police helped get the drag racing strip back to a usable state for "Operation: Drag" to stop hoon drag racing on streets. This involved the Blue Light foundation who helped run the event which was a $10 entry to drag race against someone else in a safe environment instead of on public roads.

== Major races ==
=== Tasman Series ===
With Lakeside well established as a Queensland's round of the Tasman Series it was not until 1968 that the series visited Surfers Paradise. As typified the 1968 series Jim Clark (Lotus Ford) and Chris Amon (Ferrari) filled the top two positions with Clark's teammate Graham Hill completing the podium. Formula 5000 Tasman Series rounds were also held at the circuit each year from 1970 to 1975.

Year	Winner	Car	Entrant
1968	(United Kingdom) Jim Clark	Lotus 49T Ford	Team Lotus
1970	(New Zealand) Graham McRae	McLaren M10A Chevrolet	
1971	(Australia) Frank Matich	McLaren M10B Repco Holden	Rothmans Team Matich
1972	(New Zealand) Graham McRae	Leda GM1 Chevrolet	Grid International (NZ) Ltd
1973	(Australia) Frank Matich	Matich A50 Repco Holden	Frank Matich
1974	(Belgium) Teddy Pilette	Chevron B24 Chevrolet	Chevron Racing Team VDS
1975	(Australia) Johnnie Walker	Lola T332 Repco Holden	Walker Racing

=== Australian Grand Prix ===
The Australian Grand Prix visited just once, in 1975. In torrential rain Max Stewart took his Lola T400 Formula 5000 to victory from John Leffler, who was second on a day when the F5000's were badly out-handled by Ray Winter driving his AF2 Mildren Mono Ford.

Year	Winner	Car	Entrant
1975	(Australia) Max Stewart	Lola T400 Chevrolet	Max Stewart Motors

=== Rothmans International Series ===
With the demise of the Tasman Series after 1976, the void was filled with the Rothmans International Series from 1976 to 1979. The first race scheduled for Surfers Paradise on 29 February 1976 was cancelled.

Year	Winner	Car	Entrant
1976	Race Cancelled	Race Cancelled	Race Cancelled
1977	(Australia) Warwick Brown	Lola T430 Chevrolet	Racing Team VDS
1978	(Australia) Warwick Brown	Lola T332 Chevrolet	Racing Team VDS
1979	(Republic of Ireland) David Kennedy	Wolf WR4 Ford Cosworth	Theodore Racing

=== Australian Touring Car Championship ===
The circuit hosted rounds of the Australian Touring Car Championship in 1969, 1971–72, 1974–77 and from 1979 until the circuits closure in 1987.

Year	Driver	Car	Entrant
Improved Production
1969	(Australia) Norm Beechey	Holden HK Monaro GTS327	Norm Beechey
1971	(Canada) Allan Moffat	Ford Boss 302 Mustang	Team Coca-Cola AMR
1972	(Australia) Bob Jane	Chevrolet Camaro ZL-1	Bob Jane Racing
Group C
1973	(Australia) Peter Brock	Holden LJ Torana GTR XU-1	Holden Dealer Team
1974	(Australia) Peter Brock	Holden LH Torana SL/R 5000	Holden Dealer Team
1975	(Australia) Colin Bond	Holden LH Torana SL/R 5000 L34	Holden Dealer Team
1976*	(Australia) Peter Brock	Holden LH Torana SL/R 5000 L34	Bill Patterson Holden
1977*	(Canada) Allan Moffat	Ford XC Falcon GS500 Hardtop	Moffat Ford Dealers
1979	(Australia) Bob Morris	Holden LX Torana A9X SS Hatchback	Channel Seven
1980	(Australia) Peter Brock	Holden VB Commodore	Holden Dealer Team
1981	(Australia) Dick Johnson	Ford XD Falcon	Dick Johnson Racing
1982	(Australia) Dick Johnson	Ford XD Falcon	Dick Johnson Racing
1983	(Canada) Allan Moffat	Mazda RX-7	Allan Moffat Racing
1984	(Australia) Dick Johnson	Ford XE Falcon	Dick Johnson Racing
Group A
1985	(New Zealand) Jim Richards	BMW 635 CSi	JPS Team BMW
1986	(Australia) Peter Brock	Holden Commodore VK	Holden Dealer Team
1987	(New Zealand) Jim Richards	BMW M3	JPS Team BMW

* The 1976 and 1977 ATCC rounds at Surfers were the Rothmans 300 endurance races

=== Endurance races ===
Numerous endurance races were staged at the circuit, most notably the Rothmans 12 Hour events.

Event	Winning drivers	Winning car	Date	Category
1966 Rothmans 12 Hour International Sports Car Race	Jackie Stewart; Andrew Buchanan	Ferrari 250LM	21 August 1966	Group A Sports Cars
1967 Surfers Paradise Four Hour	Kevin Bartlett; Doug Chivas	Alfa Romeo Giulia Super	9 April 1967	Production cars
1967 Rothmans 12 Hour	Bill Brown; Greg Cusack	Ferrari 250LM	3 September 1967	Group A Sports Cars
1968 Surfers Paradise 4 Hour	John French	Alfa Romeo GTV	9 June 1968	Production cars
1968 Surfers Paradise 6 Hour	Leo Geoghegan; Ian Geoghegan	Ferrari 250LM	1 August 1968	Group A Sports Cars
1969 Rothmans 12 Hour Classic	Bill Gates; John Bertram	Ford XT Falcon GT	5 January 1969	Production cars
1969 Chevron Surfers Paradise 6 Hour	Kunimitsu Takahashi; Yoshikayo Sunago	Nissan R380A-III	2 November 1969	Group A Sports Cars etc.
1970 Rothmans 12 Hour	Colin Bond; Tony Roberts	Holden HT Monaro GTS350	4 January 1970	Production cars
1970 Rothmans 250 Production Classic	Allan Moffat	Ford XW Falcon GT-HO Phase II	1 November 1970	Production cars
1971 Rothmans 250	Allan Moffat	Ford XY Falcon GT-HO Phase III	7 November 1971	Group E Series Production Touring Cars
1972 Chesterfield 300	Allan Moffat	Ford XY Falcon GT-HO Phase III	26 November 1972	Group E Series Production Touring Cars
1973 Chesterfield 300	Peter Brock	Holden LJ Torana GTR XU-1	12 November 1973	Group C Touring Cars
1974 Chesterfield 300	Colin Bond	Holden LH Torana SL/R 5000	10 November 1974	Group C Touring Cars
1975 Rothmans 300	Allan Moffat	Ford XB Falcon GT Hardtop	9 November 1975	Group C Touring Cars
1976 Rothmans 300	Peter Brock	Holden LH Torana SL/R 5000 L34	7 November 1976	Group C Touring Cars
1977 Rothmans 300	Allan Moffat	Ford XC Falcon GS500 Hardtop	6 November 1977	Group C Touring Cars
1978 Rothmans 300	Peter Brock	Holden LX Torana A9X SS Hatchback	5 November 1978	Group C Touring Cars
1979 Rothmans 300	Charlie O'Brien	Holden LX Torana A9X SS 4-Door	4 November 1979	Group C Touring Cars
1980 Compact Tennis 400	Charlie O'Brien	Holden Commodore VC	2 November 1980	Group C Touring Cars
1981 Surfers Paradise International Resort 300	Allan Moffat	Mazda RX-7	1 November 1981	Group C Touring Cars
1982 Gold Coast 300	Allan Moffat	Mazda RX-7	7 November 1982	Group C Touring Cars
1983 Gold Coast 300	Allan Grice	Holden Commodore VH	30 October 1983	Group C Touring Cars
1984 Motorcraft 300	Peter Brock	Holden Commodore VK	4 November 1984	Group C Touring Cars
1985 Motorcraft 300	Jim Richards	BMW 635 CSi	27 October 1985	Group A Touring Cars
1986 BP Plus 300	George Fury; Glenn Seton	Nissan Skyline DR30 RS	24 August 1986	Group A Touring Cars

== National championship rounds ==
Rounds of various Australian motor racing championship were held at the circuit. Winners of the Surfers Paradise round of a selection of these championships is shown below.

=== Australian Drivers' Championship ===
Year	Driver	Car	Entrant
Australian National Formula / Australian 1½ Litre Formula
1966	(Australia) Spencer Martin	Repco-Brabham BT11A Climax	Bob Jane Racing
1967	(Australia) Spencer Martin	Repco-Brabham BT11A Climax	Bob Jane Racing Team
1968	(Australia) Kevin Bartlett	Brabham BT23D Alfa Romeo	Alec Mildren Racing
Australian National Formula / Australian Formula 2
1969	(Australia) Kevin Bartlett	Mildren Mono Waggott	Alec Mildren Racing
Australian Formula 1 / Australian Formula 2
1971	(Australia) Frank Matich	McLaren M10B Repco Holden	Rothmans Team Matich
1972	(Australia) Frank Matich	Matich A50 Repco Holden	Frank Matich Racing
1973	(Australia) John McCormack	Elfin MR5 Repco Holden	Ansett Team Elfin
1974	(Australia) Max Stewart	Lola T330 Chevrolet	Max Stewart Motors
1975	(Australia) Max Stewart	Lola T400 Chevrolet	Sharp Corporation
1977	(Australia) John McCormack	McLaren M23 Repco Leyland	Budget Rent-A-Car System

=== Australian Sports Car Championship ===
Year	Driver	Car	Entrant
1969	(Australia) Frank Matich	Matich SR4 Repco	Rothmans Team Matich
1972	(Australia) John Harvey	McLaren M6B Repco	Bob Jane Racing
1982	(Australia) Chris Clearihan	Kaditcha Chevrolet	Chris Clearihan
1983	(Australia) Chris Clearihan	Kaditcha Chevrolet	Chris Clearihan
1984	(Australia) Bap Romano	Romano WE84 Cosworth	Bap Romano Racing
1985	(Australia) Chris Clearihan	Kaditcha Chevrolet	Chris Clearihan
1986	(Australia) John Bowe	Veskanda C1 Chevrolet	Bernard van Elsen

=== Australian Sports Sedan Championship ===
Year	Driver	Car	Entrant
1976	(Canada) Allan Moffat	Chevrolet Monza	Allan Moffat Racing
1977	(Australia) Bob Jane	Holden HQ Monaro Chevrolet	Bob Jane 2UW Racing Team
1978	(Australia) Allan Grice	Chevrolet Corvair	Craven Mild Racing
1979	(Australia) Phil Ward	Holden HQ Monaro Chevrolet	Channel 10 - NSW Building Society
1980	(Australia) Tony Edmondson	Alfa Romeo Alfetta GTV Repco Holden	Donald Elliott

=== Australian GT Championship ===
Year	Driver	Car	Entrant
1982	(Australia) Alan Jones	Porsche 935/80	Porsche Cars Australia
1983	(Australia) Rusty French	Porsche 935/80	John Sands Racing
1984	(Australia) Allan Grice	Chevrolet Monza	Re-Car Racing
1985	(Australia) Bryan Thomson	Chevrolet Monza	Thomson-Fowler Motorsport

== Lap records ==
The fastest official lap records at Surfers Paradise International Raceway are listed as:

Class	Time	Driver	Vehicle	Date
International Circuit (1966–1987): 3.219 km (2.000 mi)
Group A Sports Car (Over 3 litres); Group C Sports Car	1:04.3	(Australia) John Bowe	Veskanda C1	24 August 1986
Formula One	1:04.7	(Republic of Ireland) David Kennedy	Wolf WR4	18 February 1979
Group A Sports Car (1.6 to 3 litres)	1:05.8	(Australia) Bap Romano	Romano WE84	13 May 1984
Australian GT	1:09.8	(Australia) Allan Grice	Chevrolet Monza	26 August 1984
Group A Sports Car (Up to 1.6 litres)	1:13.4	(Australia) Andrew Roberts	Roberts S2	13 May 1984
Group C Touring Car (3001–6000cc)	1:15.0	(Canada) Allan Moffat (Australia) Peter Brock	Mazda RX-7; Holden VH Commodore	15 May 1983
Group A Touring Car (Under 2500cc)	1:15.5	(New Zealand) Jim Richards	BMW M3	31 May 1987
Group C Touring Car (Up to 3000cc)	1:16.1	(Australia) George Fury	Nissan Bluebird Turbo	15 May 1983
Group A Touring Car (Over 2500cc)	1:16.4	(Australia) George Fury	Nissan Skyline DR30 RS	31 May 1987

== See also ==
- Sports on the Gold Coast, Queensland
- Surfers Paradise Street Circuit
