= 1970 Australian Drivers' Championship =

Motor racing competition

Seasons
- ← 1969 1971 →

The 1970 Australian Drivers' Championship was a CAMS sanctioned motor racing title for drivers of Australian Formula 1 and Australian Formula 2 racing cars. The winner of the title, which was the fourteenth Australian Drivers' Championship, was awarded the 1970 CAMS Gold Star.

The championship was won by Leo Geoghegan driving a Lotus 39 Repco and a Lotus 59B Waggott.

== Calendar ==
The championship was contested over six rounds with one race per round.

Round	Race name	Circuit	State	Date	Round winner	Car
1	Tasmanian Road Racing Championship	Symmons Plains	Tasmania	2 March	John Harvey	Repco Brabham BT23E
2	Lakeside Governor's Trophy	Lakeside	Queensland	7 June	Max Stewart	Mildren Waggott
3	Diamond Trophy	Oran Park Raceway	New South Wales	28 June	Max Stewart	Mildren Waggott
4	Sam Hordern Trophy	Warwick Farm	New South Wales	6 September	Leo Geoghegan	Lotus 59B Waggott
5	Victorian Trophy Gold Star 100	Sandown	Victoria	13 September	John Harvey	Jane Repco
6		Mallala	South Australia	12 October	Leo Geoghegan	Lotus 59B Waggott

== Points system ==
Championship points were awarded on a 9-6-4-3-2-1 basis to the first six finishers in each round. Only the best five round results could be retained by each driver.

== Results ==
Position	Driver	Car	Entrant	Sym	Lak	Ora	War	San	Mal	Total
1	Leo Geoghegan	Lotus 39 Repco; Lotus 59 Waggott	Geoghegan's Sporty Cars	6	-	6	9	3	9	33
2	Max Stewart	Mildren Waggott	Alec Mildren Racing Pty Ltd	3	9	9	-	-	6	27
3	John Harvey	Repco Brabham BT23E	Bob Jane Shell Racing Team	9	6	1	-	9	-	25
4	Garrie Cooper	Elfin 600D Repco	Elfin GT Harrison Racing Team	-	-	4	6	6	-	16
5	Malcolm Ramsay	Elfin 600C Repco	Elfin GT Harrison Racing Team	-	-	3	3	-	3	9
6	Bob Muir	Rennmax BN3 Waggott	Robert Muir Motors	-	-	-	4	4	-	8
7	Glyn Scott	Bowin P3 Cosworth; Elfin 600 Waggott	Glyn Scott	1	4	-	-	-	-	5
7	John McCormack	Elfin 600C Coventry Climax; Elfin 600C Repco	John McCormack	-	3	2	-	-	-	5
9	Kevin Bartlett	Mildren Mono Waggott	Alec Mildren Racing Pty Ltd	4	-	-	-	-	-	4
9	Barry Kirk	Elfin 600K Ford	Barjan Mobile Auto Electrics	-	-	-	-	-	4	4
9	Jack Bono	Repco Brabham BT2 Ford	Graham Collier Tools	-	2	-	2	-	-	4
12	Len Goodwin	McLaren M4A Cosworth	Pat Burke Racing; Len Goodwin	2	1	-	-	-	-	3
13	Tony Stewart	Elfin 600B Ford	Paul England	-	-	-	-	2	-	2
13	Helene Bittner	Rebelle Ford	Helene Bittner	-	-	-	-	-	2	2
15	Ian Ferguson	Bowin P3A Ford	Ian Ferguson	-	-	-	1	-	-	1
15	Maurie Quincey	Elfin 600B Ford	Maurie Quincey	-	-	-	-	1	-	1

Note: There were only five classified finishers at the Mallala round.
