= 1975 Australian Drivers' Championship =

Motor racing competition

Seasons
- ← 1974 1976 →

The 1975 Australian Drivers' Championship was a CAMS sanctioned Australian motor racing title open to Australian Formula 1 cars and Australian Formula 2 cars. The championship winner was awarded the 1975 CAMS "Gold Star". The title, which was the nineteenth Australian Drivers' Championship, was won by John McCormack driving an Elfin MR6 Repco-Holden.

== Calendar ==
The championship was contested over a five-round series.

Round	Race name	Circuit	Date	Round format	Round winner	Car	Report
1	Australian Grand Prix	Surfers Paradise	21 August	One race	Max Stewart	Lola T400 Chevrolet	Report
2	Marlboro 100	Sandown	14 September	One race	Johnnie Walker	Lola T332 Repco-Holden	
3	Radio 2JJ Gold Star race	Oran Park	21 September	Two heats	John McCormack	Elfin MR6 Repco-Holden	
4	TAA Gold Star race	Calder	19 October	Two heats	John McCormack	Elfin MR6 Repco-Holden	
5	Phillip Island Classic Cup	Phillip Island	23 November	One race	Kevin Bartlett	Lola T400 Chevrolet	

== Points system ==
Championship points were awarded on a 9, 6, 4, 3, 2, 1 basis to the first six placegetters at each round. Only holders of a current and valid full General Competition License issued by CAMS were eligible.

== Championship results ==
Position	Driver	No.	Car	Entrant	Sur	San	Ora	Cal	Phi	Total points
1	John McCormack	9	Elfin MR6 Repco-Holden	Ansett Team Elfin	3	-	9	9	6	27
2	Johnnie Walker	25	Lola T332 Repco-Holden	John Walker	-	9	3	6	4	22
3	Max Stewart	1	Lola T400 Chevrolet	Sharp Corporation	9	-	6	4	-	19
4	Kevin Bartlett	5	Lola T400 Chevrolet	Shell Racing	-	4	1	3	9	17
5	John Leffler	7	Bowin P8 Chevrolet	Grace Brothers Levis	6	3	4	-	1	14
6	Bruce Allison	62	Lola T332 Chevrolet	Hobby & Toyland Racing	-	6	-	-	-	6
7	Ray Winter	27	Mildren Mono Ford	Ray Winter	4	-	-	-	-	4
8	Paul Bernasconi	6	Lola T330 Chevrolet	Sharp Corporation	-	2	-	2	-	4
9	Enno Busselmann	10	Elfin 622 Ford	Enno Busselmann	-	-	-	-	3	3
10	Chris Milton	10	McLaren M22 Chevrolet	Labrador Pharmacy/Shell Racing	2	-	-	1	-	3
11	Garrie Cooper	12	Elfin MR5 Repco-Holden	Ansett Team Elfin	-	-	2	-	-	2
=	Ian Fergusson		Bowin P6 Ford	Ian Fergusson	-	-	-	-	2	2
13	John Goss	2	Matich A53 Repco-Holden	John Goss Racing P/L	-	1	-	-	-	1

Note: New Zealander Graeme Lawrence placed fourth in the Surfers Paradise round but was not eligible to score championship points.

== Championship name ==
Contemporary publications used various names for the championship including Australian Formula 1 Championship, Australian Drivers' Championship and Australian National Formula One Championship. CAMS uses the term Australian Drivers' Championship in its historical documentation and this term has been used in this article.
