= 1975 Australian Grand Prix =

Coordinates: 28°0′59″S 153°22′34″E

- Round 1 of 5 of the 1975 Australian Drivers' Championship

Race details
- Date: 31 August 1975
- Official name: XL Australian Grand Prix
- Location: Surfers Paradise International Raceway, Surfers Paradise, Queensland
- Course: Permanent racing facility
- Course length: 3.219 km (2.000 miles)
- Distance: 50 laps, 160.95 km (100.00 miles)
- Weather: Heavy rain

Pole position
Driver	(Australia) Bruce Allison	Lola-Chevrolet
- Time: 1'05.8

Fastest lap
Driver	(Australia) Max Stewart	Lola-Chevrolet
- Time: 1'17.8

Podium
First	(Australia) Max Stewart	Lola-Chevrolet
Second	(Australia) John Leffler	Bowin-Chevrolet
Third	(Australia) Ray Winter	Mildren Mono-Ford

The 1975 Australian Grand Prix was a motor race for Australian Formula 1 and Australian Formula 2 racing cars, held on a very wet track at the Surfers Paradise International Raceway in Queensland, Australia on 31 August 1975. It was the fortieth Australian Grand Prix and was also Round 1 of the 1975 Australian Drivers' Championship.

1974 Australian Grand Prix winner Max Stewart won his second AGP ahead of John Leffler and Ray Winter.

== Qualifying classification ==
Pos	No.	Driver	Car	Qual	Gap
1	62	(Australia) Bruce Allison	Lola T332 / Chevrolet 5.0L V8	1:05.8	—
2	2	(Australia) John Goss	Matich A53 / Repco Holden 5.0L V8	1:05.8	+0.0
3	7	(Australia) John Leffler	Bowin P8 / Chevrolet 5.0L V8	1:07.2	+1.4
4	9	(Australia) John McCormack	Elfin MR6 / Repco Holden 5.0L V8	1:07.4	+1.6
5	5	(Australia) Kevin Bartlett	Lola T400 / Chevrolet 5.0L V8	1:08.4	+2.6
6	1	(Australia) Max Stewart	Lola T400 / Chevrolet 5.0L V8	1:08.4	+2.6
7	4	(Australia) Jon Davison	Matich A50 / Repco Holden 5.0L V8	1:08.4	+2.6
8	14	(New Zealand) Graeme Lawrence	Lola T332 / Chevrolet 5.0L V8	1:09.0	+3.2
9	15	(Australia) Terry Hook	Lola T332 / Chevrolet 5.0L V8	1:10.2	+4.4
10	27	(Australia) Ray Winter	Mildren Mono / Ford 1.6L I4	1:11.1	+5.3
11	12	(Australia) Garrie Cooper	Elfin MR5B / Repco Holden 5.0L V8	1:11.2	+5.4
12	31	(Australia) Enno Buesselmann	Elfin 622 / Ford 1.6L I4	1:11.3	+5.5
13	10	(Australia) Chris Milton	McLaren M22 / Chevrolet 5.0L V8	1:12.4	+6.6
14	16	(Australia) Ross Switzer	Rennmax BN7 / Ford 1.6L I4	1:17.6	+11.8

== Race classification ==
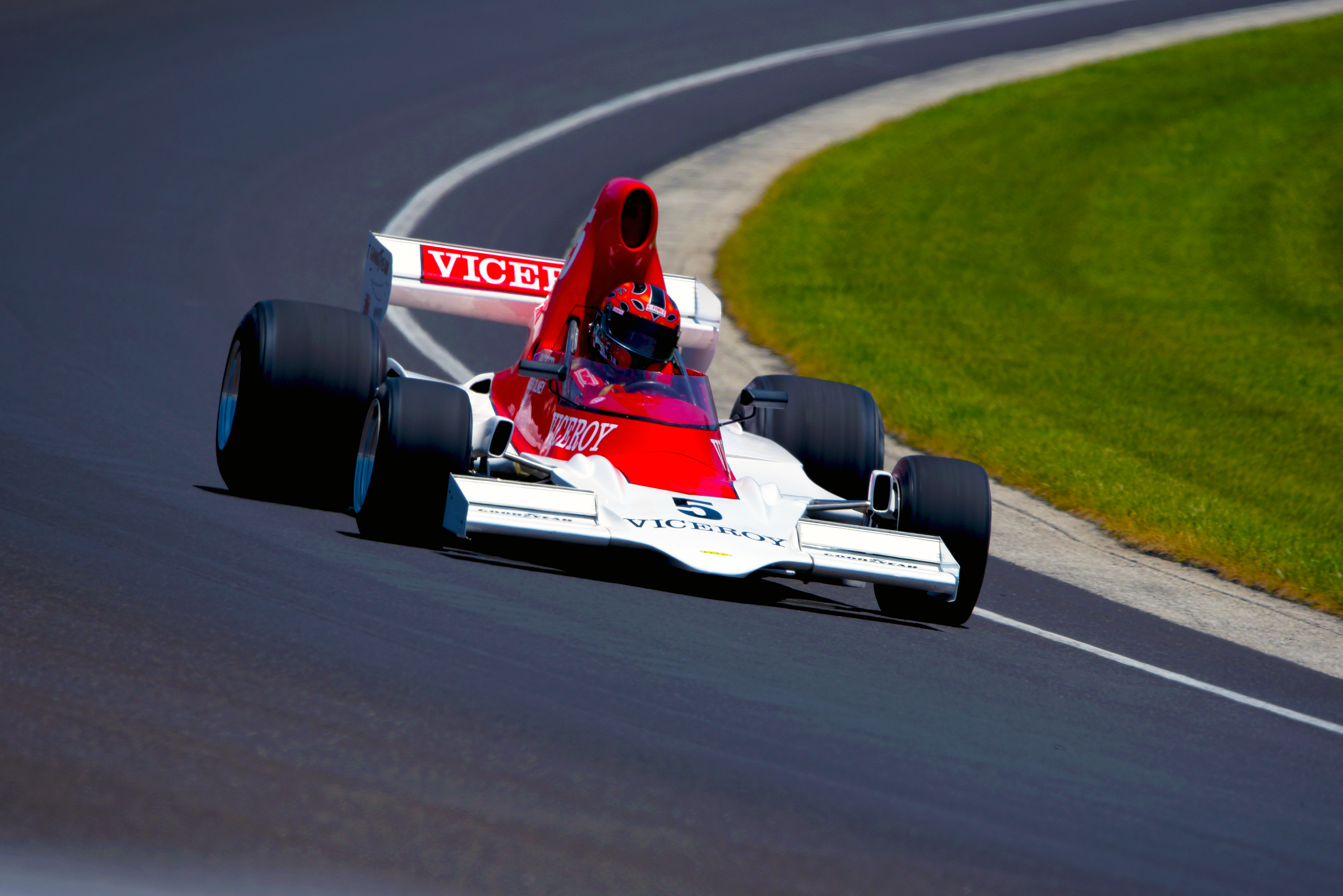
The race was won by Max Stewart driving a Lola T400 similar to the example pictured above

Pos	No.	Driver	Car	Entrant	Laps	Time / Remarks
1	1	(Australia) Max Stewart	Lola T400 / Chevrolet 5.0L V8	Sharp Corporation of Australia	50	1h 06m 55.1s
2	7	(Australia) John Leffler	Bowin P8 / Chevrolet 5.0L V8	Grace Bros-Levi's Racing Team	50	1h 07m 08.5s
3	27	(Australia) Ray Winter	Mildren Mono / Ford 1.6L 4cyl	Ray Winter	48	
4	14	(New Zealand) Graeme Lawrence	Lola T332 / Chevrolet 5.0L V8	Wix Filters	48	
5	9	(Australia) John McCormack	Elfin MR6 / Repco Holden 5.0L V8	Ansett Racing Team	47	
6	10	(Australia) Chris Milton	McLaren M22 / Chevrolet 5.0L V8	Labrador Pharmacy / Shell Racing	47	
7	4	(Australia) Jon Davison	Matich A50 / Repco Holden 5.0L V8	Jon Davison	41	
Ret	12	(Australia) Garrie Cooper	Elfin MR5B / Repco Holden 5.0L V8	Ansett Team Elfin	36	front suspension
Ret	62	(Australia) Bruce Allison	Lola T332 / Chevrolet 5.0L V8	Zupps of Mt Gravatt / Hobby & Toyland Racing	17	poor visibility / tyres
Ret	5	(Australia) Kevin Bartlett	Lola T400 / Chevrolet 5.0L V8	Shell Racing / Kevin Bartlett	9	poor visibility
Ret	16	(Australia) Ross Switzer	Rennmax BN7 / Ford 1.6L 4cyl	Ross Switzer	8	unsuitable tyres
Ret	2	(Australia) John Goss	Matich A53 / Repco Holden 5.0L V8	John Goss Racing	4	poor visibility / rough engine
Ret	31	(Australia) Enno Buesselmann	Elfin 622 / Ford 1.6L I4	Enno Buesselmann	3	poor visibility
Ret	15	(Australia) Terry Hook	Lola T332 / Chevrolet 5.0L V8	Sharp Corporation of Australia	1	unsuitable tyres

=== Notes ===
- Pole position: Bruce Allison - 1'05.8
- Winner's average speed: 144.36 km/h, 89.70 mph
- Fastest lap: Max Stewart - 1'17.8 (148.94 km/h, 95.54 mph)

Preceded by 1974 Australian Grand Prix	Australian Grand Prix; 1975	Succeeded by 1976 Australian Grand Prix
