= Kevin Bartlett (racing driver) =

Australian motor racing driver

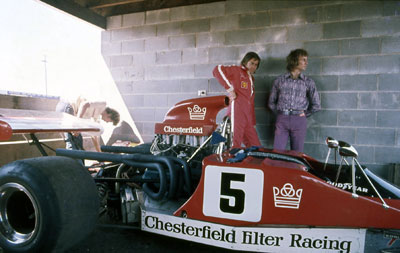
- Kevin Bartlett and his Lola T300 at the Surfers Paradise round of the 1972 Australian Drivers' Championship
- Nationality: Australian
- Born: Kevin Reginald Bartlett; 25 May 1940 (age 86) Coffs Harbour, New South Wales, Australia
- Retired: 1990

Australian Touring Car Championship
- Years active: 1960, 1966-67, 1980-83, 1985-87
- Teams: Alec Mildren Racing; Nine Network Race Team; Mitsubishi Ralliart
- Starts: 40
- Wins: 3
- Best finish: 2nd in 1980 Australian Touring Car Championship

Previous series
- 1985 1977 1970 1966-75 1966-75 1965: Australian GT Championship; Australian Sports Sedan Championship; USAC Championship Cars; Tasman Series; Australian Drivers' Championship; Australian 1½ Litre Championship

Championship titles
- 1968 1969 1969 1974: Australian Drivers' Championship; Australian Drivers' Championship; Macau Grand Prix; Bathurst 1000

Kevin Reginald Bartlett (born 25 May 1940 in Coffs Harbour, New South Wales), often known by his nickname "KB", is an Australian former open wheel and touring car racing driver who won the Australian Drivers' Championship in 1968 and 1969, as well as the 1974 Bathurst 1000. Bartlett was named in Wheels magazine's annual yearbook in 2004 as one of Australia's 50 greatest race drivers. He placed #15 on the list.

== Racing career ==
Bartlett first arrived on the Australian racing scene in 1958 when he competed in the Touring Car Scratch Race at Bathurst, driving a 950cc Morris Minor.

Over the next few years, Bartlett progressed through the levels of Australian motorsport before his big break came when he was hired to drive for 1960 Australian Grand Prix winner Alec Mildren in the Tasman Series of open wheel racing. Bartlett proved competitive in this series and would become a fixture of Alec Mildren Racing for the next decade racing a long line of open-wheel racing cars and Alfa Romeo touring cars. Bartlett won the 1965 International 6 Hour Touring Car Race for the Mildren team, driving an Alfa Romeo TI Super with Frank Gardner and he also won the 1967 Surfers Paradise Four Hour, driving a similar car with Doug Chivas.

Bartlett got his first works drive via motoring journalist and part time rally driver Evan Green at Bathurst driving a Morris Mini de Luxe for the BMC team in the 1965 Armstrong 500.

At the 1967 Bathurst Easter meeting, Bartlett became the first driver to ever lap the 6.172 km mountain circuit at an average speed of over 100 mph driving a 1964 Repco Brabham BT11A Climax.

In 1969, Bartlett took his Mildren-Alfa Romeo to the win at the Macau Grand Prix for Formula Libre cars. Bartlett considers the win as one of the highlights of his motor racing career. He returned to the event in 2019 for the 50th anniversary of his win.

In 1970, Bartlett traveled to the United States to compete in the USAC Championship (aka Indy Car) series, attempting and failing to qualify for the Indianapolis 500. Bartlett competed in three other Indy Car races, but failed to finish.

Bartlett was signed on to co-drive with John Goss in the 1973 Bathurst 1000, in a brand-new Ford XA Falcon GT Hardtop.They qualified on pole position for the race and led for over three-and-a-half hours, but crashed out of the race on lap 110. They returned the in 1974 and won the event with Bartlett holding off the Bob Forbes Torana and bringing the Goss Falcon home in the rain. Bartlett's Bathurst-winning drive in 1974 was achieved while he still carried hip and pelvis injuries from a major crash at the Pukekohe round of the Tasman Series nine months earlier.

Bartlett was a fixture of Formula 5000 throughout the 70s with a series of Lolas and briefly the unique Brabham BT43 Formula 5000. As the decade closed and Formula 5000 declined, Bartlett returned to touring cars, developing the American Chevrolet Camaro Z28 for Australian Group C with the partnership of Kerry Packer's television network the Nine Network. The car (which Bartlett had purchased new from Unser Chevrolet in New Mexico) debuted, without Bartlett, at the 1979 Bathurst 1000. Bartlett was to co-drive with Bob Forbes, but a bad F5000 crash in the Brabham BT43 at the Sandown Gold Star Round on 9 September 1979 saw Bartlett watch the race from a wheelchair nursing a broken arm and leg with F5000 and Sports Sedan racer John McCormack taking his place in the car.

Bartlett was back in 1980 and was the only driver to seriously challenge the Holden Dealer Team Holden Commodore VB of Peter Brock in the 1980 Australian Touring Car Championship. Bartlett would go on to take pole position for the 1980 Bathurst 1000 at Bathurst in the Camaro but his race was soured by the car being forced to run drum brakes on the rear with his first stop to change the rear drums coming after only 14 laps (guest Channel 7 pit reporter Chris Economaki reported that the drums were so hot when they came off the car that they literally blistered the paint on the inside pit wall). Later in the race Bartlett tangled with a baby car class Isuzu Gemini on top of The Mountain simply because he had run out of brakes and couldn't stop in time. The Gemini rolled and after coming into the pits Bartlett told a national television audience that he was sorry for the incident but that the blame lay squarely with CAMS regulations not allowing the Camaro's to run 4-wheel disc brakes. In the interview he told Channel 7's Evan Green "And of course with our stupid bloody CAMS rules not allowing us to have disc brakes in the back this thing just doesn't stop, its bloody dangerous out there without discs. And I just hit him, and just rolled him. You know sure he made a mistake, but in a normal situation I should have been able to slow up enough. This car doesn't stop, it slows up. That's the difference".

Bartlett only contested two rounds of the 1981 Australian Touring Car Championship in the Camaro, which by now was allowed to run 4 wheel disc brakes making it a much safer and much more formidable challenger. He then chose not to race in the 1981 Hang Ten 400 at Sandown, but still went to Bathurst as one of the favourites. He claimed his second pole in a row on The Mountain in frightfully wet conditions, recording a time that was 15.46 seconds slower than he had been 12 months earlier. After a good start where he was dicing with Brock's Holden Commodore and the Ford Falcon's of Dick Johnson and Bob Morris (who would eventually finish 1st and 2nd respectively), a number of small problems, including a crash with the Commodore of Ron Wanless saw the Camaro finally finish 13th, 11 laps down on Johnson. The crash with Wanless prompted a fired up KB to tell Channel 7 that "A complete and utter amateur nincumpoop got in the way" and that he was "Going to punch him in the mouth when the race was over", though he later told that he thankfully didn't go through with it after finding out that Wanless was also a semi-professional boxer.

The Camaro was coming towards the end of its development in 1982. He finished equal third on points with Allan Moffat in the 1982 Australian Touring Car Championship, winning his final ATCC race at Sydney's Oran Park in Round 4. He then enlisted the services of Colin Bond to be his co-driver in the Australian Endurance Championship. Bond drove the Camaro in the 250 km Perrier Gold Cup at Oran Park where the car was competitive but suffered tyre problems. They then went to the 1982 Bathurst 1000 as a strong contender for their third straight pole position, but suffered a set-back in qualifying when a tyre blew on top of The Mountain, sending bond into the guardrail. Despite this, Bartlett qualified the car in fourth place. Bartlett then had an early race duel for third place with the Falcon of Dick Johnson and the second Dealer Team Commodore of John Harvey which went on for a number of laps. Bartlett's race ended on lap 27 when the Camaro blew its left rear tyre at Reid Park, sending him into the fence and causing the car to roll onto its roof and slide across the track with a close following Johnson only just missing him.

Bartlett's final race in the Camaro came in the Oran Park round of the 1983 ATCC, though by this time he was not competitive and he only recorded a ninth-place finish. He then went on to be Dick Johnson's co-driver in the 1983 Bathurst 1000, though the race weekend was a disaster for the team after Johnson's Hardie's Heroes crash at Forrest's Elbow destroyed the Greens-Tuf Falcon. A car swapping deal was then done and the team had another Falcon ready to run for the race, but the hastily built Ford was well off the pace and was eventually retired on lap 61.

Bartlett's autobiography entitled "Big Rev Kev" was published in 1983.

In 1984, Bartlett headed Mitsubishi's first factory backed attack on the Bathurst 1000 with the Mitsubishi Starion turbo running in the new Group A class that would become uniform in 1985. Unfortunately Bathurst would prove problematic for the team with the cars being forced to run components that weren't compatible with the engine's electronics and the car was uncompetitive. Bartlett then led Mitsubishi's first assault on the Australian Touring Car Championship in 1985, finishing in a fine third place in the opening round at Winton, but ultimately dropping to ninth in the series as the established teams got their Group A cars up to speed. He and motoring journalist Peter McKay then went on to finish 9th outright and second in class in the 1985 Bathurst 1000 at Bathurst.

During 1985, Bartlett also drove a ground effects De Tomaso Pantera designed and built by ex-Formula One mechanic and Kaditcha racing cars owner Barry Lock to finish fourth in the 1985 Australian GT Championship. Bartlett only drove in the opening round of the 1986 ATCC at Amaroo Park in a privately entered Starion (though he would not complete enough laps to be classified as a finisher), and would join the Frank Gardner run JPS Team BMW as a co-driver in the team's second BMW 635 CSi for the Sandown 500 and the Bathurst 1000 where he would co-drive with Trevor Crowe. Unfortunately, the BMW was a non finisher in both races.

In 1987, Bartlett drove a Maserati Biturbo for World Touring Car Championship team Pro Team Italia on their visit to Australia and New Zealand. While the Maserati was, on paper, a strong contender, in reality the car was under developed and well off the pace and although driving with Armin Hahne and Bruno Giacomelli (who failed to qualify at Bathurst), the car only lasted 29 laps of the race.

1988 saw Bartlett team with longtime rival John Harvey in a Bob Forbes Racing owned Holden VL Commodore SS Group A SV in the Bathurst 1000. After the new car had some teething problems in practice, they would start 22nd on the grid. The car initially raced faster than it qualified and Harvey (who started) was soon into the top-ten and battling with the BMW M3 of Peter Brock, but was forced to pit after 20 laps with a clutch problem. Ultimately, they would finish in 14th place, 21 laps down on the winners.

After another start in a privately entered Mitsubishi Starion turbo in the 1989 Bathurst 1000, Bartlett's final drive in racing was the 1990 Bathurst 1000, sharing a Bob Forbes Racing Holden Commodore VL with Russell Ingall and Rohan Onslow.

According to Bartlett, the 1990 Bathurst 1000 nearly killed him. The night before the race the team had bled the car's water system and unfortunately left the heater tap on which was not discovered until after the race. The result was that both Bartlett and Ingall suffered from dehydration with Bartlett collapsing in the pits and being placed on a drip after his driving stint (making matters worse was during his stint Bartlett knocked his water bottle over and had nothing to drink). Onslow, who was cross entered in the car and was the co-driver of the team's lead Commodore with Mark Gibbs, was forced to finish the race in the No. 13 car as neither Bartlett nor Ingall could do so. A couple of months after the race, Bartlett suffered a heart attack which required a quadruple bypass, effectively ending his 32-year racing career. His specialists put his heart attack down to the trauma he suffered during the race.

== Retirement ==
In his retirement, Bartlett works part-time to maintain the famous Bowden collection of historic racing cars, which includes Bartlett's Chevrolet Camaro.

On 24 October 2000, Bartlett was awarded the Australian Sports Medal for his motor racing achievements.

== Career results ==
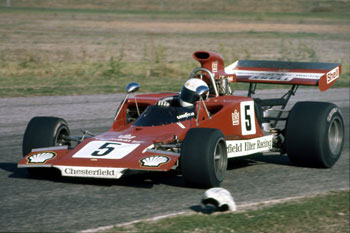
Bartlett placed 2nd in the 1972 Australian Drivers' Championship driving a Lola T300

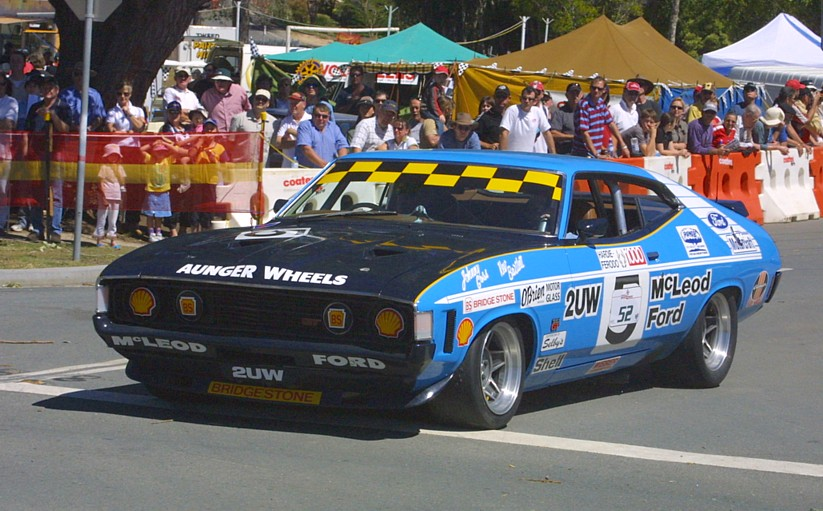
John Goss's reproduction of the 1974 Bathurst 1000 winning Falcon

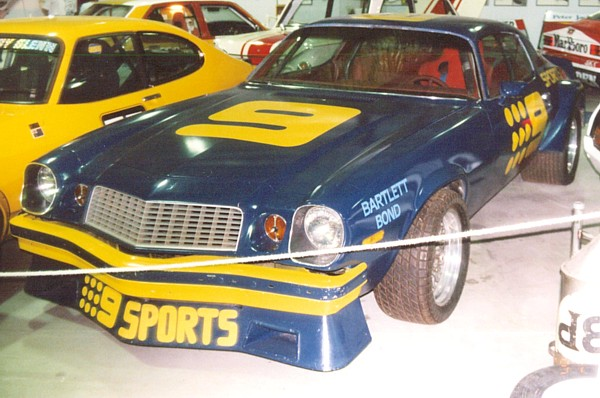
Bartlett's Chevrolet Camaro

Season	Series	Position	Car	Team / Entrant
1960	Australian Touring Car Championship (Under 1000cc)	**2nd**	Morris Minor 1000	K Bartlett
1965	Australian Formula 2 Championship	**3rd**	Elfin Imp	Jim McGuire
1965	Australian 1½ Litre Championship	8th	Elfin Imp	Jim McGuire
1966	Tasman Series	11th	Repco Brabham BT2 Ford	Alec Mildren Racing
1966	Australian Drivers' Championship	**3rd**	Brabham BT11A Coventry Climax FPF	Alec Mildren Racing
1966	Australian Touring Car Championship	**3rd**	Alfa Romeo GTA	Alec Mildren Racing
1967	Tasman Series	6th	Brabham BT11A Coventry Climax FPF	Alec Mildren Racing
1967	Australian Drivers' Championship	**3rd**	Brabham BT11A Coventry Climax FPF	Alec Mildren Racing
1967	Australian Touring Car Championship	4th	Alfa Romeo GTA	Alec Mildren Racing
1968	Tasman Series	13th	Brabham BT11A Coventry Climax FPF	Alec Mildren Racing
1968	Australian Drivers' Championship	**1st**	Brabham BT23D Alfa Romeo	Alec Mildren Racing
1969	Tasman Series	13th	Brabham BT23D Alfa Romeo	Alec Mildren Racing
1969	Australian Drivers' Championship	**1st**	Mildren Mono Alfa Romeo; Mildren Mono Waggott TC4V	Alec Mildren Racing
1970	Tasman Series	3rd	Mildren Mono Waggott TC4V	Alec Mildren Racing
1970	Australian Drivers' Championship	9th	Mildren Mono Waggott TC4V	Alec Mildren Racing
1971	Tasman Series	5th	Mildren (Franklen) Chevrolet	Alec Mildren Racing
1971	Australian Drivers' Championship	**2nd**	McLaren M10B Chevrolet	Kevin Bartlett Shell Racing
1972	Tasman Series	5th	McLaren M10B Chevrolet	Kevin Bartlett Shell Racing
1972	Australian Drivers' Championship	**2nd**	Lola T300 Chevrolet	Shell / Chesterfield Racing
1972	L&M Continental 5000 Championship	18th	McLaren M10B Chevrolet & Lola T300 Chevrolet	Eisert Jones Racing; Kevin Bartlett
1973	Tasman Series	11th	Lola T300 Chevrolet	Chesterfield Filter Racing
1973	Australian Drivers' Championship	7th	Lola T300 Chevrolet	Chesterfield Filter Racing
1974	Australian Drivers' Championship	**2nd**	Lola T332 Chevrolet	Chesterfield Filter Racing
1975	Tasman Series	8th	Lola T400 Chevrolet	Chesterfield Filter Racing
1975	Australian Drivers' Championship	4th	Lola T400 Chevrolet	Shell Racing K Bartlett
1976	Peter Stuyvesant International Series	7th	Lola T400 Chevrolet	K Bartlett Shell Sport
1976	Rothmans International Series	4th	Lola T400 Chevrolet	K Bartlett Shell Sport
1976	Australian Drivers' Championship	8th	Lola T400 Chevrolet	Shellsport
1977	Australian Drivers' Championship	6th	Lola T400 Chevrolet	K Bartlett
1977	Australian Sports Sedan Championship	7th	Holden LX Torana	ShellSport
1978	Australian Drivers' Championship	3rd	Brabham BT43 Chevrolet	Thomson Motor Auctions
1979	Rothmans International Series	15th	Lola T400 Chevrolet	Thomson Motor Auctions
1980	Australian Touring Car Championship	**2nd**	Chevrolet Camaro Z28	Nine Network Race Team
1981	Australian Touring Car Championship	11th	Chevrolet Camaro Z28	Nine Network Race Team
1982	Australian Touring Car Championship	**3rd**	Chevrolet Camaro Z28	Nine Network Race Team
1983	Australian Touring Car Championship	37th	Chevrolet Camaro Z28	Idaps People
1983	Better Brakes AMSCAR Series	23rd	Chevrolet Camaro Z28	Idaps People
1984	Australian Super Series	6th	Mitsubishi Starion Turbo	Kevin Bartlett
1985	Australian Touring Car Championship	9th	Mitsubishi Starion Turbo	Ralliart Australia
1985	Australian GT Championship	4th	De Tomaso Pantera	Paul Halstead/Toy Shop

=== Complete Australian Drivers' Championship results ===
Year	Team	Car	1	2	3	4	5	6	Rank	Points
1966	Alec Mildren Racing	Brabham BT11A Coventry Climax FPF	LAK; 2	SUR; Ret	MAL; Ret	SAN; 2	SYM; Ret	WAR; 1	**3rd**	21
1967	Alec Mildren Racing	Brabham BT11A Coventry Climax FPF	LAK; 1	SUR; Ret	SAN; Ret	MAL; 2	SYM; 6	WAR; Ret	**3rd**	16
1968	Alec Mildren Racing	Brabham BT23E Alfa Romeo	BAT; Ret	LAK; 1	SUR; 1	SAN; Ret	MAL; 2	WAR; 1	**1st**	33
1969	Alec Mildren Racing	Mildren Mono Alfa Romeo Mildren Mono Waggott TC4V	SYM; 1AR	BAT	SAN; 2AR	MAL; 4W	SUR; 1AR	WAR; 1W	**1st**	36
1970	Alec Mildren Racing	Mildren Mono Waggott TC4V	SYM; 3	LAK; Ret	ORA	WAR	SAN	MAL	9th	4
1971	Kevin Bartlett Shell Racing	McLaren M10B Chevrolet	LAK; 1	ORA; Ret	SUR; 4	SAN; 1	SYM; 6	MAL; 3	**2nd**	22
1972	Shell / Chesterfield Racing	Lola T300 Chevrolet	SAN; Ret	ORA; 2	SUR; 4	SYM	ADE; 1	WAR; 2	**2nd**	24
1973	Chesterfield Filter Racing	Lola T300 Chevrolet	SUR; 10	ADE; Ret	PHI; 3	SAN; 9	PHI; Ret		7th	4
1974	Chesterfield Filter Racing	Lola T332 Chevrolet	ORA; Ret	SUR; 3	CAL; 2	SAN; 2	ORA; Ret	PHI; 1	**2nd**	25
1975	Shell Racing Kevin Bartlett	Lola T400 Chevrolet	SUR; Ret	SAN; 3	ORA; 6	CAL; 4	PHI; 1		4th	17
1976	Shellsport	Lola T400 Chevrolet	SAN; Ret	ORA; 2	CAL; 9	PHI			8th	6
1977	Kevin Bartlett	Lola T400 Chevrolet	SUR; 4	SAN; 3	CAL; Ret	PHI; 6			6th	8
1978	Thomson Motor Auctions	Brabham BT43 Chevrolet	ORA; 2	SAN; 5	CAL; Ret				**3rd**	8

=== Complete Tasman Series results ===
Year	Team	Car	1	2	3	4	5	6	7	8	Rank	Points
1966	Alec Mildren Racing Pty Ltd	Repco Brabham BT2 Ford	PUK	LEV	WIG	TER	WAR; Ret	LAK; 5	SAN; 8	LON	11th	2
1967	Alec Mildren Racing Pty Ltd	Repco Brabham BT11A Coventry Climax FPF	PUK; Ret	LEV	WIG; 5	TER	LAK; 5	WAR; 6	SAN; 5	LON; 5	6th	9
1968	Alec Mildren Racing	Brabham BT11A Coventry Climax FPF	PUK	LEV	WIG	TER	SUR; 5	WAR; Ret	SAN; 8	LON; 5	13th	2
1969	Alec Mildren Racing	Brabham BT23E Alfa Romeo	PUK	LEV	WIG	TER	LAK; Ret	WAR; 4	SAN; Ret		9th	3
1970	Alec Mildren Pty. Ltd.	Mildren Mono Waggott TC4V	LEV; Ret	PUK; 5	WIG; Ret	TER; 5	SUR; 2	WAR; 1	SAN; Ret		**3rd**	19
1971	Alec Mildren Racing Pty Ltd	Mildren Chevrolet	LEV; Ret	PUK; Ret	WIG; Ret	TER; 4	WAR; 3	SAN; Ret	SUR; DNS		8th	7
1972	Kevin Bartlett Shell Racing	McLaren M10B Chevrolet	PUK; 4	LEV; Ret	WIG; 3	TER; 1	SUR; Ret	WAR; 3	SAN; Ret	AIR; Ret	5th	20
1973	Chesterfield Filter Racing	Lola T300 Chevrolet	PUK; Ret	LEV; 4	WIG; 7	TER; 8	SUR; 10	WAR; 8	SAN; Ret	AIR; 9	11th	3
1975	Chesterfield Filter Racing	Lola T400 Chevrolet	LEV; 3	PUK; Ret	WIG; Ret	TER; 3	ORA; 10	SUR; 6	AIR; Ret	SAN; 4	7th	12

=== American Open-Wheel ===
(key) (Races in bold indicate pole position)

==== USAC Indycars ====
Year	Team	1	2	3	4	5	6	7	8	9	10	11	12	13	14	15	16	17	18	Rank	Points
1970	Webster Racing	PHX	SON; 12	TTN	IND; DNQ	MIL	LAN	CDR; 16	MIS	IRP	ISF	MIL	ONT; Ret	DQF	ISF	MSF	TTN	CSF	PHX	NC	0

==== Indianapolis 500 ====
Year	Chassis	Engine	Start	Finish	Team
1970	Eisert	Ford	DNQ		Webster Racing

=== Complete Australian Touring Car Championship results ===
(key) (Races in bold indicate pole position) (Races in italics indicate fastest lap)

Year	Team	Car	1	2	3	4	5	6	7	8	9	10	DC	Points
1960	K Bartlett	Morris Minor 1000	GNO; 2*										2nd (class)	-
1966	Alec Mildren Racing	Alfa Romeo GTA	BAT; 3										3rd	-
1967	Alec Mildren Racing	Alfa Romeo GTA	LAK; 4										4th	
1980	Nine Network Racing Team	Chevrolet Camaro Z28	SYM; 2	CAL; 2	LAK; 4	SAN; 1	WAN; 4	SUR; Ret	AIR; 1	ORA; DSQ			2nd	52
1981	Nine Network Racing Team	Chevrolet Camaro Z28	SYM	CAL	ORA; 3	SAN	WAN	AIR; 3	SUR; Ret	LAK			11th	12
1982	Nine Network Racing Team	Chevrolet Camaro Z28	SAN; 4	CAL; Ret	SYM; 3	ORA; 1	LAK; Ret	WAN	AIR; 3	SUR			3rd	31
1983	Kevin Bartlett	Chevrolet Camaro Z28	CAL	SAN	SYM	WAN	AIR	SUR	ORA; 9	LAK			37th	9
1985	Ralliart Australia	Mitsubishi Starion Turbo	WIN; 3	SAN; 8	SYM; DNS	WAN; 7	AIR; 8	CAL; 9	SUR; DNS	LAK; DNS	AMA	ORA	9th	75
1986	Kevin Bartlett	Mitsubishi Starion Turbo	AMA; NC	SYM	SAN	AIR	WAN	SUR	CAL	LAK	WIN	ORA	NC	0

* 2nd in class in 1960. Outright result not known.

=== Complete World Touring Car Championship results ===
(key) (Races in bold indicate pole position) (Races in italics indicate fastest lap)

Year	Team	Car	1	2	3	4	5	6	7	8	9	10	11	DC	Points
1987	(Italy) Pro Team Italia	Maserati Biturbo	MNZ	JAR	DIJ	NUR	SPA	BNO	SIL	BAT; Ret	CLD; Ret	WEL	FJI	NC	0

=== Complete Asia-Pacific Touring Car Championship results ===
(key) (Races in bold indicate pole position) (Races in italics indicate fastest lap)

Year	Team	Car	1	2	3	4	DC	Points
1988	(Australia) Bob Forbes Racing	Holden VL Commodore SS Group A SV	BAT; 14	WEL	PUK	FJI	NC	0

=== Complete Bathurst 500/1000 results ===
Year	Car#	Team	Co-drivers	Car	Class	Laps	Pos.	Class pos.
1963	16		(Australia) Bill Reynolds	Holden EH 179	C	115	NA	7th
1965	55	(Australia) BMC	(Australia) Ron Haylen	Morris Mini de Luxe	A	111	28th	6th
1966	8		(Australia) John Harvey	Volvo 122S	D	119	15th	4th
1967	61	(Australia) Alec Mildren Alfa Romeo	(Australia) Laurie Stewart	Alfa Romeo 1600 GTV	E	130	4th	**2nd**
1968	1	(Australia) Alec Mildren Racing Pty Ltd	(Australia) Doug Chivas	Alfa Romeo 1750 GTV	E	129	4th	**1st**
1969	71	(Australia) Alec Mildren Alfa Romeo	(Australia) Len Goodwin	Alfa Romeo 1750 GTV	E	126	8th	1st
1971	55	(Australia) Sinclair Ford Pty Ltd	drove solo	Ford XY Falcon GT-HO Phase III	E	126	14th	7th
1973	5	(Australia) McLeod Ford	(Australia) John Goss	Ford XA Falcon GT Hardtop	D	110	DNF	DNF
1974	5	(Australia) McLeod Ford – 2UW	(Australia) John Goss	Ford XA Falcon GT Hardtop	3001–6000cc	163	**1st**	**1st**
1975	1	(Australia) John Goss Racing Pty Ltd	(Australia) John Goss	Ford XB Falcon GT Hardtop	D	10	DNF	DNF
1976	15	(Australia) Captain Peter Janson	(New Zealand) Peter Janson	Holden LH Torana SL/R 5000 L34	3001cc – 6000cc	158	5th	5th
1977	11	(Australia) Bob Forbes	(Australia) Bob Forbes	Holden LX Torana SS A9X Hatchback	3001cc – 6000cc	147	DNF	DNF
1978	10	(Australia) Garry & Warren Smith Pty Ltd	(Australia) Bob Forbes	Holden LX Torana SS A9X Hatchback	A	136	22nd	10th
1980	9	(Australia) Nine Network Racing Team	(Australia) Bob Forbes	Chevrolet Camaro Z28	3001–6000cc	152	11th	10th
1981	9	(Australia) Nine Network Racing Team	(Australia) Bob Forbes	Chevrolet Camaro Z28	8 Cylinder & Over	111	13th	8th
1982	9	(Australia) Nine Network Racing Team	(Australia) Colin Bond	Chevrolet Camaro Z28	A	27	DNF	DNF
1983	17	(Australia) Dick Johnson Racing	(Australia) Dick Johnson	Ford XE Falcon	A	61	DNF	DNF
1984	66	(Australia) Equipe Sixty Six (Hong Kong)	(Australia) Peter Fitzgerald	Mitsubishi Starion Turbo	Group A	27	DNF	DNF
1985	42	(Australia) Mitsubishi Ralliart	(Australia) Peter McKay	Mitsubishi Starion Turbo	B	157	9th	**2nd**
1986	9	(Australia) JPS Team BMW	(New Zealand) Trevor Crowe	BMW 635 CSi	C	109	DNF	DNF
1987	1	(Italy) Pro Team Italia	(West Germany) Armin Hahne (Italy) Bruno Giacomelli	Maserati Biturbo	1	29	DNF	DNF
1988	12	(Australia) Bob Forbes Racing	(Australia) John Harvey	Holden VL Commodore SS Group A SV	A	140	14th	10th
1989	44	(Australia) Sutherland Mitsubishi	(Australia) Gary Scott (Australia) Terry Shiel	Mitsubishi Starion Turbo	A	141	18th	16th
1990	13	(Australia) Bob Forbes Racing	(Australia) Russell Ingall (Australia) Rohan Onslow	Holden VL Commodore SS Group A SV	1	146	17th	15th

=== Complete 24 Hours of Daytona results ===
Year	Team	Co-drivers	Car	Class	Laps	Pos.	Class pos.
1985	(Australia) Allan Moffat Racing	(Canada) Allan Moffat (Australia) Gregg Hansford (Australia) Peter McLeod	Mazda RX-7	GTO	482	24th	7th

Sporting positions
Preceded by Roberto Bussinello; Ralph Sachs	Winner of the Sandown 500; 1965 (with Frank Gardner)	Succeeded by Tony Roberts; Bob Watson
Preceded by Spencer Martin	Winner of the Australian Drivers' Championship; 1968 and 1969	Succeeded by Leo Geoghegan
Preceded by Jan Bussell	Macau Grand Prix; Winner; 1969	Succeeded by Dieter Quester
Preceded by Allan Moffat; Ian Geoghegan	Winner of the Bathurst 1000; 1974 (with John Goss)	Succeeded by Peter Brock; Brian Sampson
