= 1965 Australian Formula 2 Championship =

Australian motor racing championship

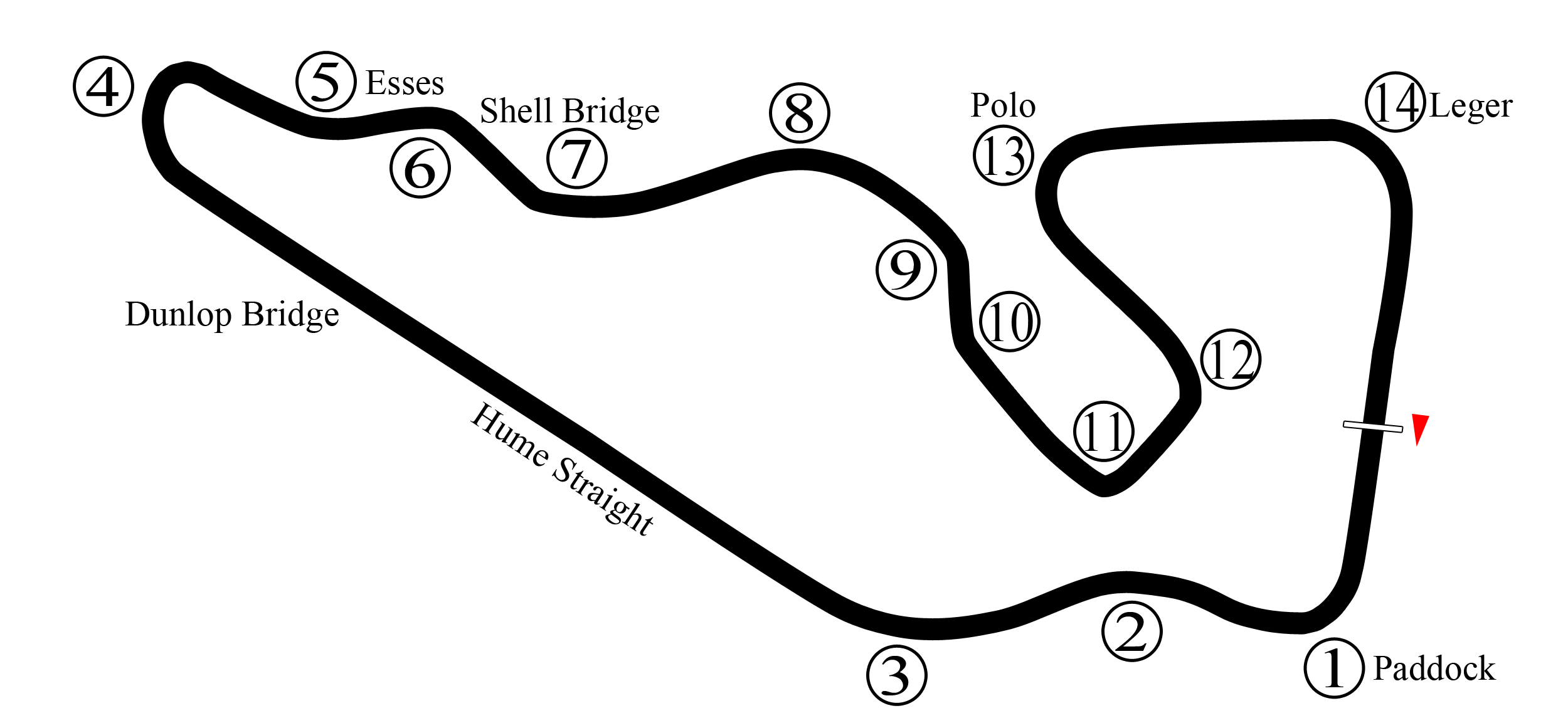
Layout of the Warwick Farm Raceway (1960-1973)

The 1965 Australian Formula 2 Championship was a CAMS sanctioned motor racing title open to Racing Cars complying with Australian Formula 2. The championship was contested over a single, 34 lap, 76.5 mile (123 km) race at the Warwick Farm circuit in New South Wales, Australia on 19 September 1965. It was the second Australian Formula 2 Championship to be awarded.

The championship was won by Greg Cusack, driving a Repco Brabham Cosworth.

== Results ==
Position	Driver	No.	Car	Entrant	Laps
1	Greg Cusack	1	Repco Brabham Cosworth	G Cusack	34
2	Max Stewart	12	Rennmax Ford	M Stewart	34
3	Kevin Bartlett	11	Elfin Imp	J McGuire	33
4	Ralph Sach	3	Repco Brabham Ford	Alec Mildren Racing Pty Ltd	
5	John Marchiori	5	Lotus 20 Ford	Bamar Engineering	
6	Ken Shirvington	8	Lotus 20B Cosworth	KW Shirvington	
?	P West	10	Lotus 20 Cosworth	Hy-Grade Service Station	
?	R McCaughey	14	Lotus 18 Ford	R McCaughey	
?	K Pinkstone		Brabham		
?	A Lazich	20	Piranha Fiat	Rolls Motors Pty Ltd	
?	D Ferris	4	Lotus 20 Ford	Middle Cove Friendly Garage	
?	D Collins	15	Lotus 18 Ford	Amoco Swan Street	
DNF	Tim Schenken	16	Lotus 18 Ford	T Schenken	20
DNF	Les Howard	7	Lotus 27 Ford	Howard & Sons Racing Team	3
DNF	Ian Kaufman	17	Elfin Cosworth	I Kaufman	

=== Notes ===
- Pole position: Greg Cusack, 1m 42.3s
- Starters: 15
- Finishers: 10
- Fastest lap: Greg Cusack, 1m 41.2s, 80.04 mph, new Formula 2 lap record
