= 1974 Australian Drivers' Championship =

Motor racing competition

Seasons
- ← 1973 1975 →

The 1974 Australian Drivers' Championship was a CAMS sanctioned Australian motor racing title for drivers of Australian Formula 1 and Australian Formula 2 racing cars with the winner awarded the 1974 CAMS "Gold Star". It was the 18th Australian Drivers' Championship.

The championship was won by Max Stewart driving a Lola T330 Chevrolet.

== Calendar ==
The championship was contested over six rounds:

Round	Name	Circuit	State	Date	Format
1	Chesterfield Filter Cup	Oran Park	New South Wales	4 August	Two Heats
2	The Glynn Scott Memorial Trophy	Surfers Paradise	Queensland	1 September	Two Heats
3		Calder	Victoria	20 October	Two Heats
4	Marlboro 100 (Incorporating the Victorian Trophy Race)	Sandown Park	Victoria	3 November	One race
5	Australian Grand Prix	Oran Park	New South Wales	17 November	One race
6		Phillip Island	Victoria	24 November	One race

== Points system ==
Championship points were awarded on a 9-6-4-3-2-1 basis to the top six placegetters at each round. Only holders of a CAMS General Competition Licence were eligible, therefore any placings gained by international licence holders were ignored by CAMS when allocating championship points.

== Championship standings ==
Position	Driver	Car	Entrant	Ora.	Sur.	Cal.	San.	Ora.	Phi.	Total
1	Max Stewart	Lola T330 Chevrolet	Max Stewart Motors	9	9	9	9	9	6	51
2	Kevin Bartlett	Lola T332 Chevrolet	Chesterfield Filter Racing	-	4	6	6	-	9	25
3	Phil Moore	Elfin MR5 Repco-Holden	Ansett Team Elfin	3	6	3	4	-	-	16
4	Garrie Cooper	Elfin MR5 Repco-Holden	Ansett Team Elfin	-	1	4	-	3	3	11
5	John McCormack	Elfin ML6 Leyland; Elfin MR5 Repco-Holden	Ansett Team Elfin	2	-	-	-	6	-	8
6	John Leffler	Bowin P8 Ford	Grace Bros - Levi's Team	1	2	2	2	-	-	7
6	Jon Davison	Matich A50 Repco-Holden	Jon Davison	-	-	-	3	4	-	7
8	Warwick Brown	Lola T332 Chevrolet	Pat Burke Racing	6	-	-	-	-	-	6
9	John Goss	Matich A53 Repco-Holden	McLeod Ford	4	-	-	-	-	-	4
9	Kurt Seeberg	Brabham BT36 Ford	Ken Dykes Racing	-	-	-	-	-	4	4
11	Bruce Allison	Birrana 274 Ford		-	3	-	-	-	-	3
12	Chas Talbot	Birrana 274 Ford	Chas Talbot	-	-	1	-	-	-	1
