= 1968 Surfers Paradise 4-Hour =

Coordinates: 28°0′59″S 153°22′34″E

The 1968 Surfers Paradise 4-Hour was an endurance race for Series Production Touring Cars. It was held at the Surfers Paradise International Raceway in Queensland, Australia on 9 June 1968. The race was won by John French, driving an Alfa Romeo GTV.

== Classes ==
The race was open to models of which at least 200 had been manufactured in Australia or 100 had been imported after 1 January 1964. Cars competed in five classes according to the retail price of each model.

== Results ==
| Position | Drivers | No. | Car | Entrant | Laps |
|---|---|---|---|---|---|
| | Class A : Up to $1800 | | | | |
| 1 | Peter Lefranke; K. Turner | | Toyota Corolla | Farsley Motors | 132 |
| 2 | Jim Laing-Peach; Bob Drane | | Toyota Corolla | Dranes Tuning Shoppe | 128 |
| 3 | Allan Johns; Dave Frazer | | Hillman GT | Allan Johns | 127 |
| 4 | Fred Sayers; Graham Finan | | Morris Mini De Luxe | Fred Sayers | 127 |
| | Class B : $1801 to $2100 | | | | |
| 1 | Barry Tapsall | 26 | Datsun 1600 | B. Tapsall | 137 |
| 2 | Ann Thomson; Toni Lefranke | | Morris Cooper | Grand Prix Auto Service | 131 |
| 3 | W. Collins; N. McLeod | | Morris Cooper | W. Collins | 126 |
| 4 | T. Gilltrap; Stuart Anderson | 22 | Hillman Arrow | T. Gilltrap | 124 |
| Disq | Radford; D. Seldon | | Morris Cooper | Varsity Auto Centre | 135 |
| | Class C : $2101 to $3000 | | | | |
| 1 | M. McGregor; F. Hunt | | Morris Cooper S | M McGregor | 140 |
| 2 | Mike Champion; Barry Arentz | | Ford XR Falcon V8 | Competition Cars | 140 |
| 3 | T. Basile; Joe Vasta | | Fiat 125 | Tony Basile | 135 |
| 4 | Glyn Scott; Max Volkers | | Ford XT Falcon V8 | G. Scott Motors | 134 |
| ? | Paul Zacka; Graham Perry | | Holden HK V8 Automatic | | |
| DNF | Gracie; James | | Morris Cooper S | | |
| DNF | Cam Skinner; Stanley | | Morris Cooper S | Marque Motors | |
| Disq | Mal Brewster; Digby Cooke | | Morris Cooper S | Marque Motors | 142 |
| | Class D : $3001 to $4500 | | | | |
| 1 | Bill Gates; Jim Bertram | | Ford XR Falcon GT | Bill Gates | 143 |
| 2 | Ken Stacey; Bruce McIntyre | | Ford XR Falcon GT | Wright Ford Motors | 142 |
| 3 | Dennis Geary; Murray Harrod | | Ford XR Falcon GT | Denis Geary Motors | 140 |
| 4 | Roy Griffiths; Ian Ferguson | | Ford XR Falcon GT | R. Griffith | 138 |
| 5 | Gerry Trebilcock; Neville Trebilcock | | BMW 1600 | G. Trebilcock | 133 |
| | Class E : Over $4500 | | | | |
| 1 | John French | 61 | Alfa Romeo GTV | Alec Mildren (Qld.) | 146 |
| 2 | Keith Littlemore; Graham Littlemore | 63 | Alfa Romeo GTV | Grand Prix Auto Service | 139 |
| 3 | Frank Perry; D. Morrow | | Alfa Romeo GTV | F. Perry | 137 |

=== Notes ===
- Starters: 26
- Non-finishers: 4
