= 1974 Australian Grand Prix =

- Round 5 of 6 of the 1974 Australian Drivers' Championship

Race details
- Date: November 17, 1974
- Official name: XXXIX Australian Grand Prix
- Location: Oran Park Raceway, Sydney, New South Wales
- Course: Permanent racing facility
- Course length: 2.620 km (1.628 miles)
- Distance: 61 laps, 159.82 km (99.308 miles)
- Weather: Sunny

Pole position
Driver	(Australia) Max Stewart	Lola-Chevrolet
- Time: 1'05.2

Fastest lap
Driver	(Australia) Warwick Brown	Lola-Chevrolet
- Time: 1'05.2

Podium
First	(Australia) Warwick Brown	Lola-Chevrolet
Second	(Australia) John McCormack	Elfin-Repco Holden
Third	(New Zealand) Graeme Lawrence	Lola-Chevrolet

The 1974 Australian Grand Prix was a motor race held at Oran Park Raceway in New South Wales, Australia on 17 November 1974. It was open to Racing Cars complying with Australian Formula 1 or Australian Formula 2. The race, which was the thirty-ninth Australian Grand Prix, was Round Five of the 1974 Australian Drivers' Championship.

Australian driver Max Stewart won the race, ahead of John McCormack and Graeme Lawrence. It was Stewart's first Australian Grand Prix victory.

== Classification ==
Results were as follows:

== Qualifying ==
Pos	Driver	No.	Car	Entrant	Qual	Gap
1	(Australia) Max Stewart	6	Lola T330 / Chevrolet 5.0L V8	Max Stewart Motors	1:05.2	—
2	(Australia) Warwick Brown	2	Lola T332 / Chevrolet 5.0L V8	Pat Burke Racing	1:05.3	+0.1
3	(Australia) Kevin Bartlett	5	Lola T332 / Chevrolet 5.0L V8	Chesterfield Filter Racing	1:05.9	+0.7
4	(Italy) Lella Lombardi	1	Matich A51 / Repco Holden 5.0L V8	Ansett Team	1:07.0	+1.8
5	(Australia) John McCormack	9	Elfin MR5 / Repco Holden 5.0L V8	Ansett Team Elfin	1:07.5	+2.3
6	(New Zealand) Graeme Lawrence	14	Lola T332 / Chevrolet 5.0L V8	Marlboro Racing	1:08.0	+2.8
7	(Australia) Garrie Cooper	3	Elfin MR5 / Repco Holden 5.0L V8	Ansett Team Elfin	1:09.2	+4.0
8	(Australia) Jon Davison	4	Matich A50 / Repco Holden 5.0L V8	J. Davison	1:09.2	+4.0
9	(Australia) John Leffler	7	Bowin P8 / Hart 1.6L I4	Grace Bros. Race Team	1:09.7	+4.5
10	(Australia) John Goss	8	Matich A53 / Repco Holden 5.0L V8	John Goss Racing Pty. Ltd.	1:11.9	+6.7
11	(Australia) Ken Shirvington	15	March 732 / Hart 1.6L I4	K. Shirvington	1:14.4	+9.2

== Race ==
Pos	Driver	No.	Car	Entrant	Laps	Time
1	(Australia) Max Stewart	6	Lola T330 / Chevrolet 5.0L V8	Max Stewart Motors	61	1h 08m 43.0s
2	(Australia) John McCormack	9	Elfin MR5 / Repco Holden 5.0L V8	Ansett Team Elfin	61	1h 09m 43.3s
3	(New Zealand) Graeme Lawrence	14	Lola T332 / Chevrolet 5.0L V8	Marlboro Racing	60	1h 08m 51.2s
4	(Australia) Jon Davison	4	Matich A50 / Repco Holden 5.0L V8	J. Davison	59	1h 09m 13.0s
5	(Australia) Garrie Cooper	3	Elfin MR5 / Repco Holden 5.0L V8	Ansett Team Elfin	58	1h 09m 19.9s
Ret	(Australia) Kevin Bartlett	5	Lola T332 / Chevrolet 5.0L V8	Chesterfield Filter Racing	58	fuel pick up
Ret	(Australia) Warwick Brown	2	Lola T332 / Chevrolet 5.0L V8	Pat Burke Racing	49	harmonic balancer
Ret	(Italy) Lella Lombardi	1	Matich A51 / Repco Holden 5.0L V8	Ansett Team	47	oil pump
Ret	(Australia) John Leffler	7	Bowin P8 / Hart 1.6L 4cyl	Grace Bros. Race Team	26	valve
DNS	(Australia) John Goss	8	Matich A53 / Repco Holden 5.0L V8	John Goss Racing Pty. Ltd.		engine bearing
DNQ	(Australia) Ken Shirvington	15	March 732 / Hart 1.6L 4cyl	K. Shirvington		Did not qualify

== Notes ==
- Attendance: More than 20,000
- Pole position: Max Stewart - 1'05.2
- Fastest lap: Warwick Brown - 1'05.2, 146.3 km/h (90.9 mph), new outright record

== Notes & references ==
Preceded by 1973 Australian Grand Prix	Australian Grand Prix; 1974	Succeeded by 1975 Australian Grand Prix
