= Toby Lee Series =

Defunct Australian motor racing series

- Category: Touring car racing Sports Sedan; Formula 5000
- Country: Australia
- Inaugural season: 1970
- Folded: 1975
- Last Drivers' champion: Max Stewart

The Toby Lee Series was an Australian motor racing series run at Oran Park Raceway in Sydney, between 1970 and 1975.

In 1970 Oran Park, with backing from sponsors Toby Lee (a brand of shirts) and department store Grace Bros, launched a new series of races for Group E Series Production sedans. The "Toby Lee Series" usually featured a 100 lap final round and quickly became very popular, attracting large crowds to Oran Park.

The series featured a number of leading Sydney-based drivers, such as Holden Dealer Team driver Colin Bond, emerging Ford privateer John Goss, Ford stalwart Fred Gibson and Chrysler drivers Leo Geoghegan and Doug Chivas. The Toby Lee played its part in popularising production sedan racing and in establishing the passionate Holden-Ford rivalry that would endure for decades to come.

After three years of racing under Series Production regulations (1970–1972) the Toby Lee Series switched to Sports Sedans for the 1973 and 1974 seasons. 1973 saw competitive racing with big fields. Leading contenders included John Harvey and Colin Bond in Torana Repco V8s, Bill Brown and Jim McKeown driving Porsche Carreras, Leo Geoghegan's Porsche 911S, and Allan Moffat's Ford Mustang Boss 302. But when John McCormack rolled out his highly modified Chrysler Valiant Charger Repco V8 in 1974 it dominated the series. This led to a lessening of interest in the series and the fields dwindled in the second half of 1974.

For its final year of 1975 a radical switch was made away from sedan racing altogether and the Toby Lee became an open-wheeler Formula 5000 series. Max Stewart's Lola T400 won the 1975 series from the Matich A53 of John Goss.

== List of winners ==
Year	Driver	Car	Team
1970	Fred Gibson	Ford Falcon GTHO Phase I	Road & Track
1971	Fred Gibson	Ford Falcon GTHO Phase II	Road & Track
1972	Colin Bond	Holden Torana GTR XU-1	Holden Dealer Team
1973	John Harvey	Holden Torana Repco V8	Bob Jane Racing
1974	John McCormack	Chrysler Charger Repco Holden V8	Ansett Team Elfin
1975	Max Stewart	Lola T400	Sharp Racing Team
