= 1984 Australian Super Series =

The 1984 Australian Super Series was an Australian motor racing competition for Group E Series Production Cars. With prizemoney totaling $200,000, the series was claimed, at the time, to be "the richest race series staged in Australia".

The series was won by Peter Fitzgerald driving a Mitsubishi Starion.

== Race schedule ==
The series was contested over six rounds with two heats and a final at each round.

Round	Circuit	State	Date	Round winner	Car
1	Calder Park	Victoria	29 April	Peter Fitzgerald	Mitsubishi Starion
2	Adelaide International Raceway	South Australia	6 May	Brian Sampson	Mitsubishi Starion
3	Amaroo Park	New South Wales	20 May	Peter Fitzgerald	Mitsubishi Starion
4	Adelaide International Raceway	South Australia	1 July	Peter Fitzgerald	Mitsubishi Starion
5	Amaroo Park	New South Wales	8 July	Peter Fitzgerald	Mitsubishi Starion
6	Calder Park	Victoria	29 July	Peter Fitzgerald	Mitsubishi Starion

== Series standings ==
Position	Driver	Car	Entrant	Points
1	Peter Fitzgerald	Mitsubishi Starion	Eastside Mitsubishi / Palcolor Phot Services	118
2	Brian Sampson	Mitsubishi Starion	Melbourne Clutch & Brake Service Pty Ltd	90
3	Ross Burbidge	Alfa Romeo Alfasud	John French	?
4	Colin Bond	Alfa Romeo GTV6	Network Alfa	?
5	Phil Alexander	Ford Laser	Alexander Rotary	?
6	Kevin Bartlett	Mitsubishi Starion	Kevin Bartlett	?
7	Brad Jones	Mitsubishi Starion	Bradley Jones	?
