= Rennmax =

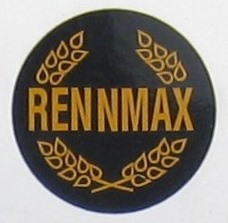

The Rennmax name was applied to a series of open wheel racing cars and sports racing cars constructed by Rennmax Engineering in Sydney, Australia between 1962 and 1978. Rennmax Engineering was established by Bob Britton in 1961, its name derived from the 1950s German NSU motorcycles Max and Rennmax, with "Renn" meaning race. The 1953 and 1954 250cc World Championships were won by Werner Haas riding a NSU Rennmax.

== Models ==
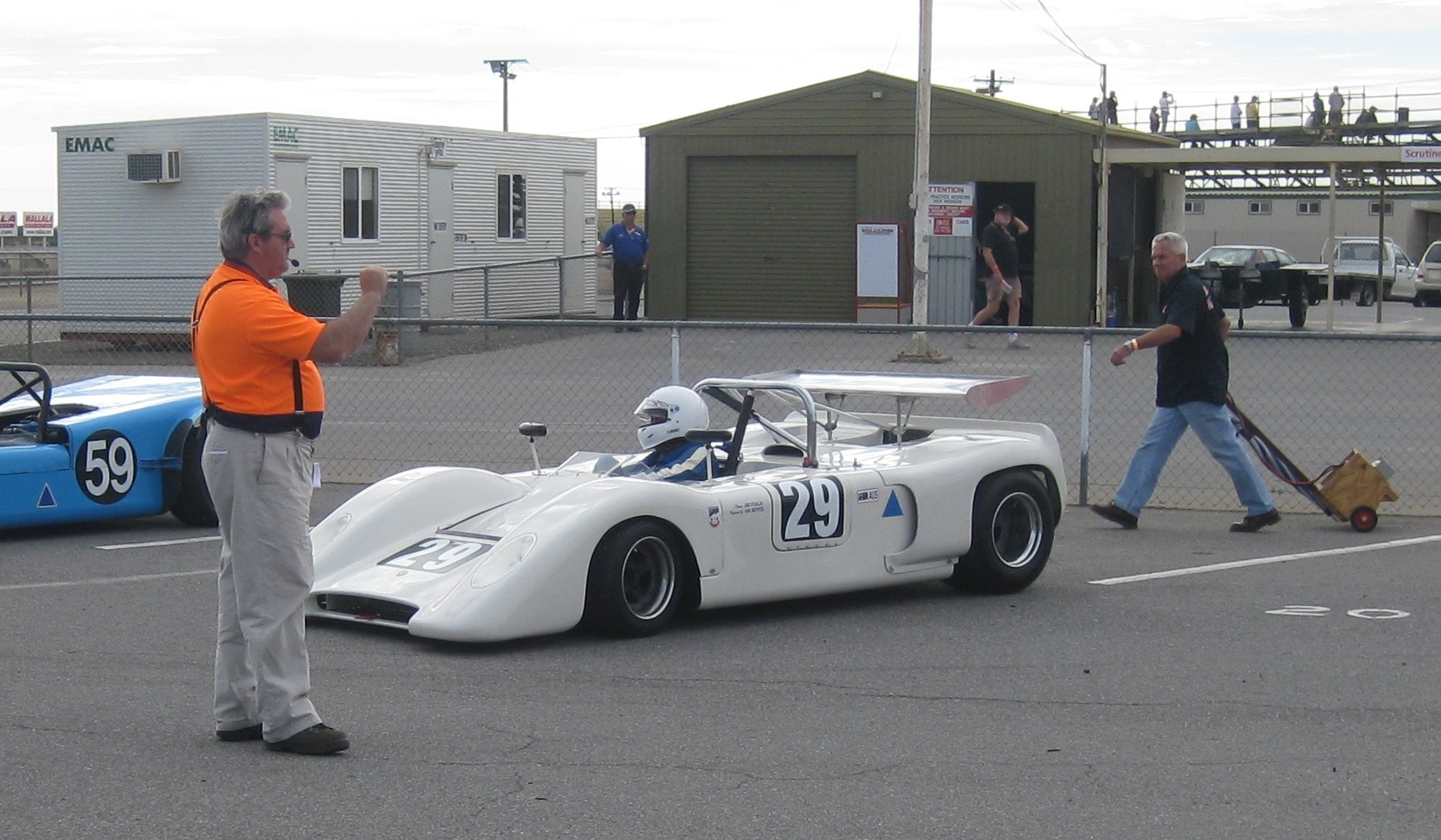
1971 Rennmax BN6 sports racing car

Although Rennmax cars are often referred to by model designations such as BN2, BN3 etc., Britton claimed that the origins of these were unknown to him and in practice he did not even stamp chassis numbers on his creations. The following list utilises these unofficial model designations and also includes models which were built by Rennmax Engineering but raced under names other than Rennmax.

=== Rennmax Climax ===
The first Rennmax chassis, built for Noel Hall in 1962, utilised numerous components from Hall's Cooper, including a 2.2-litre Coventry Climax engine.

=== Rennmax BN1 ===
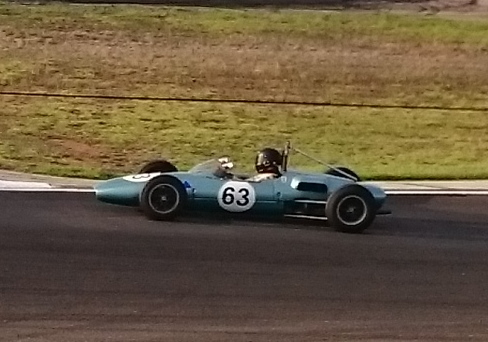
Rennmax BN1

The Rennmax BN1 was a single seater racing car incorporating concepts from the Lotus 20 & Lotus 22 designs. At least 6 examples were built circa 1962–1964.

=== Rennmax Vee ===
The Rennmax Vee was a Formula Vee racing car produced in series for Greg Cusack and Bruce Burr. Nine cars were built during 1965–66. The cars were originally referred to as CBs but each example was later renamed to "Rennmax".

=== Mildren Maserati ===
The Mildren Maserati was a sports racing car built for Alec Mildren in 1965. It was constructed in the style of the Lotus 23, utilised various components from a Cooper T51 and was powered by a 2.9-litre Maserati Type 61 engine.

=== Lotus 23 replica ===
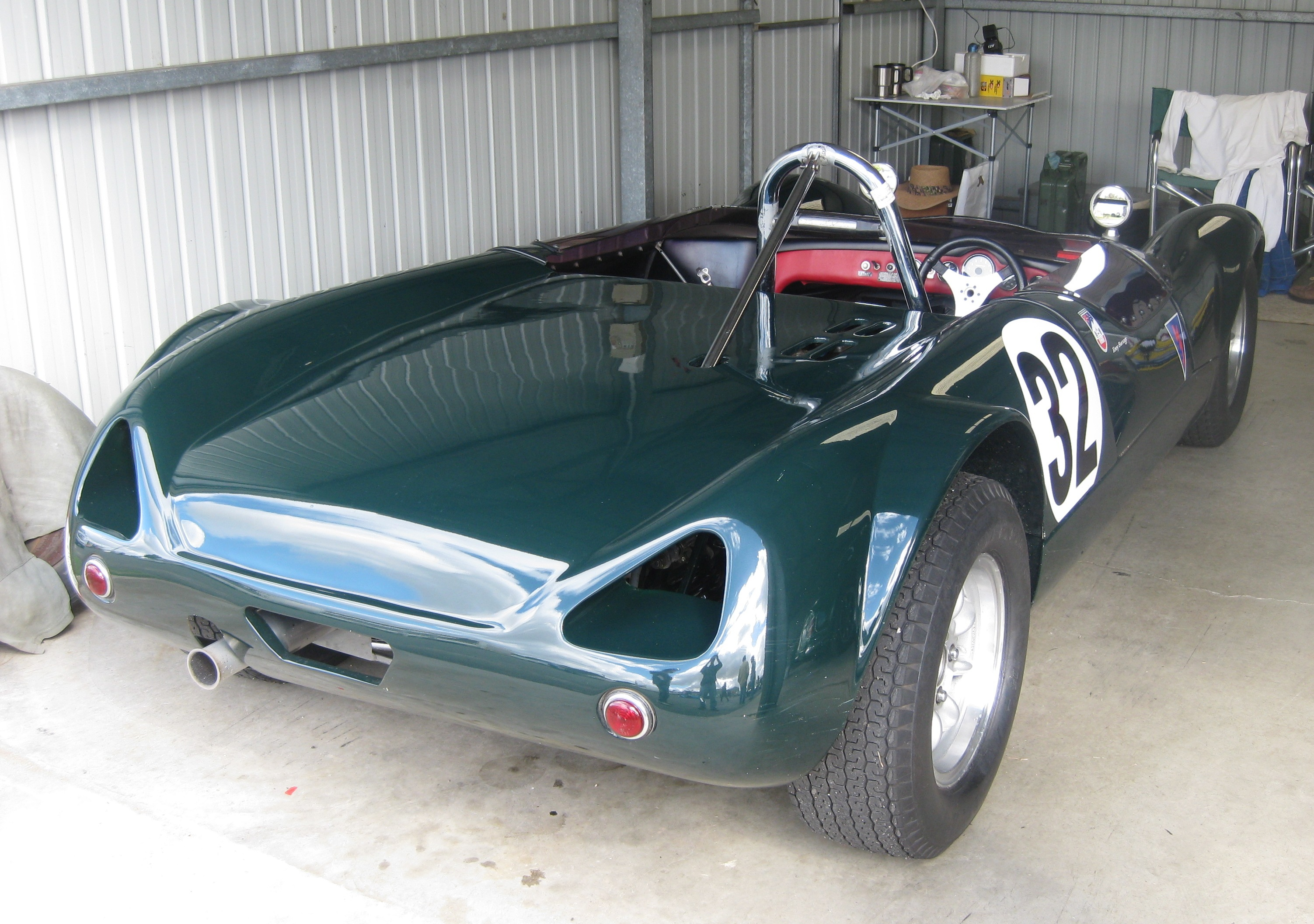
Rennmax 23B, a replica of the Lotus 23B

A series of replica Lotus 23 sports racing cars were constructed in the mid 1960s.

=== Matich SR3 ===
The Matich SR3 sports racing cars were constructed by Rennmax Engineering for Frank Matich. Bob Britton then accompanied Matich to the United States when he competed in the 1967 Can-Am season.

=== Rennmax BN2 ===
The Rennmax BN2 was a one-off single seater model, based on the Brabham BT14 and built for Max Stewart in February 1968. It used a 1.5-litre Ford twin cam engine.

=== Mildren (Waggott) ===
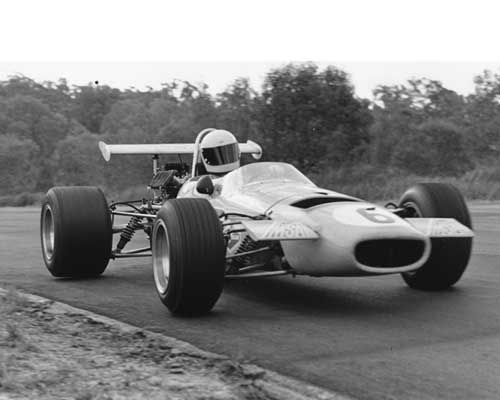
Max Stewart won the 1971 Australian Drivers' Championship at the wheel of the Mildren Waggott

The Mildren, based on the Brabham BT23, was produced for Alec Mildren in 1968. Initially power by a 1.6 Alfa Romeo engine, it later used a Waggott powerplant. Racing as the Mildren Waggott, the car was used by Max Stewart to win the 1969 Australian Formula 2 Championship, the 1970 Australian Formula 2 Championship and the 1971 Australian Drivers' Championship.

=== Rennmax BN3 ===
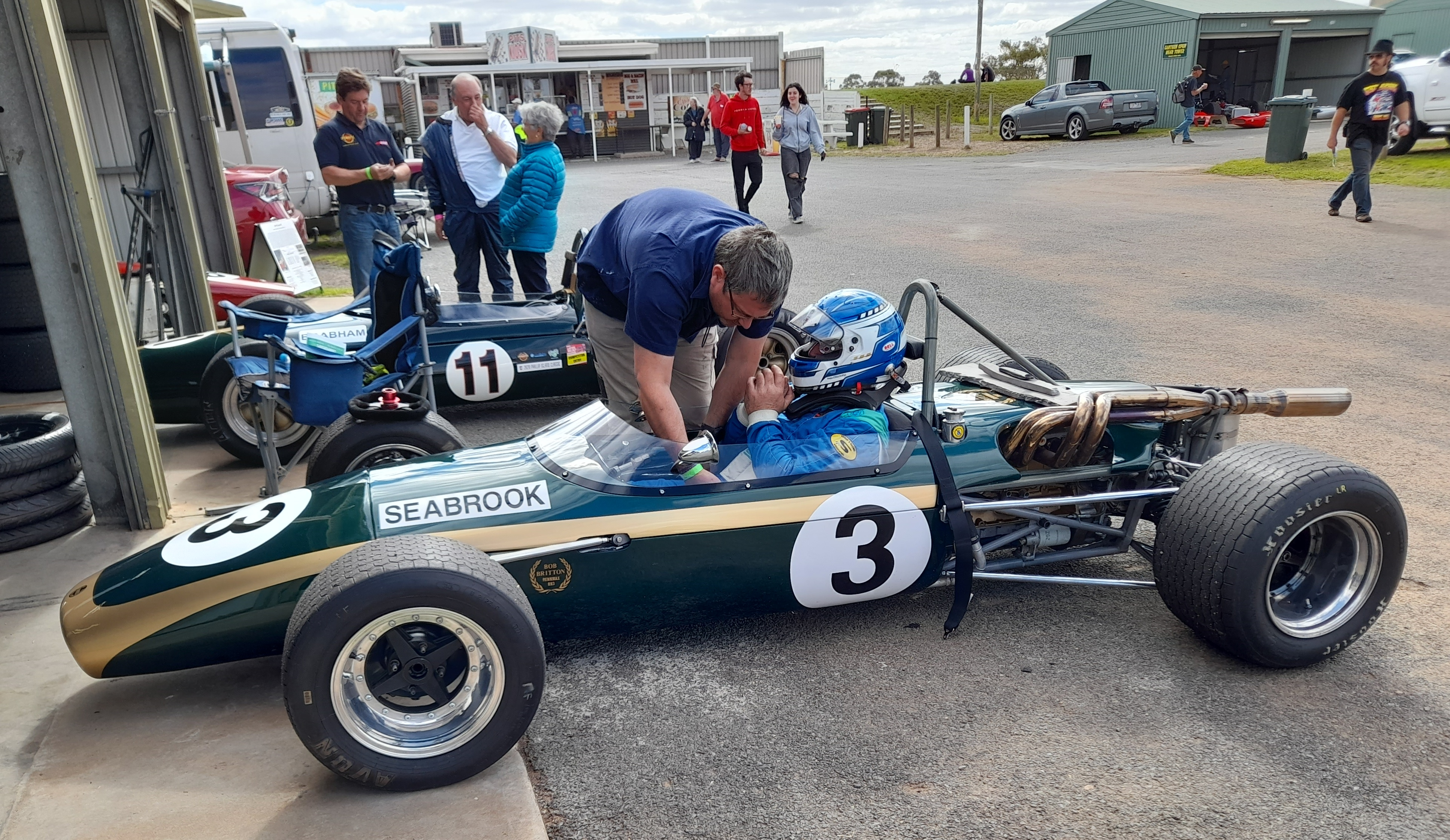
Rennmax BN3

The Rennmax BN3 was an open wheeler design derived from the Brabham BT23-based Mildren. Five examples were built between 1968 and 1971.

=== Rennmax BN6 (Sports racing car) ===
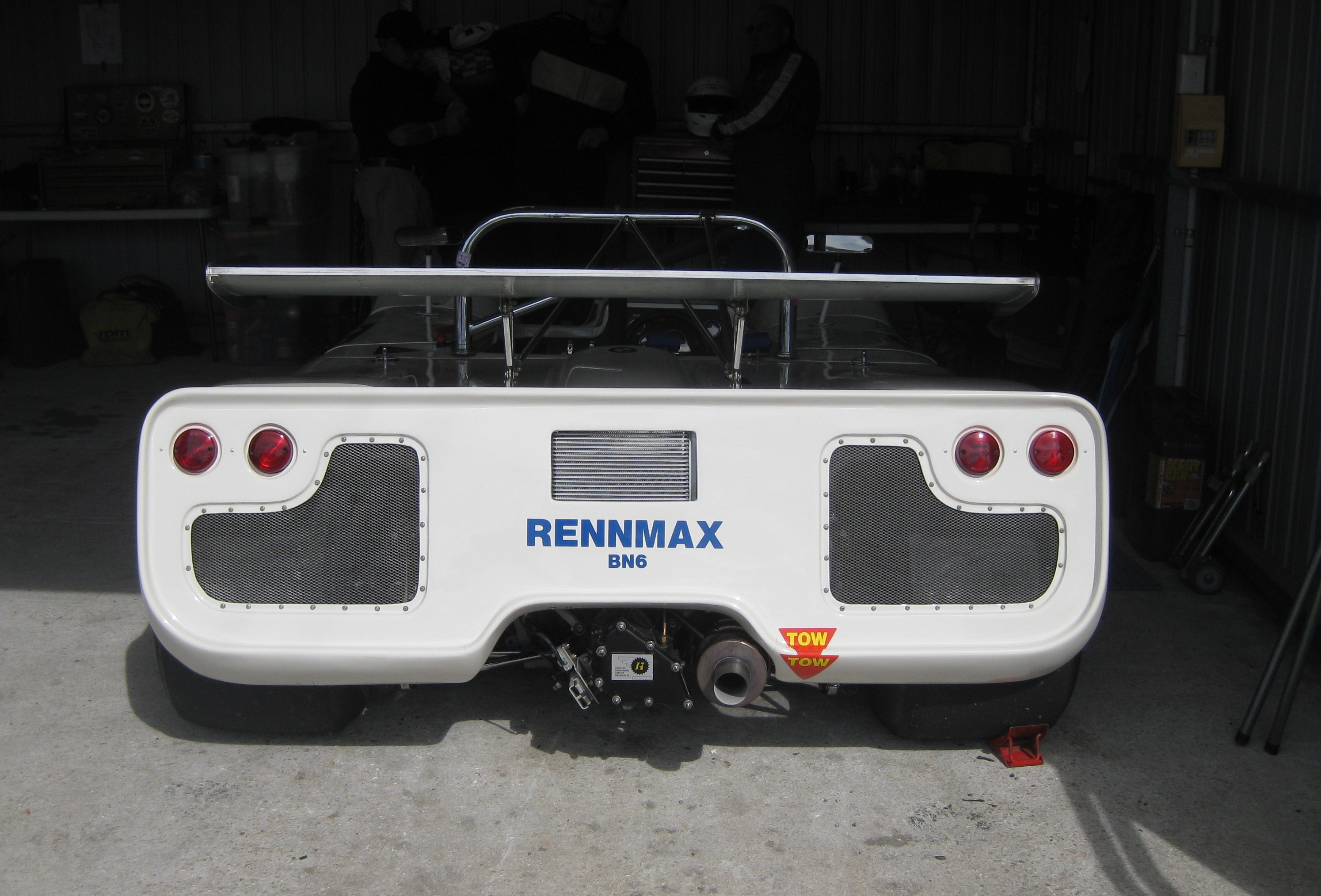
Rennmax BN6

A Rennmax sports racing car, powered by a 2-litre BMW engine, was built in 1970 for Doug Macarthur. A second chassis was built the following year for Ray Hanger who also commissioned another example in 1982. This model has been referred to as the Rennmax BN6 although this designation has also been applied to an Australian Formula 2 car of 1974. (see Rennmax BN6 (Formula 2) below)

=== Rennmax Repco ===
The Rennmax Repco was a one off sports racing car built in 1972 for Lionel Ayers and powered by a 5-litre Repco V8 engine.

=== Rennmax BN6 (Formula 2) ===
The Rennmax BN6 was a one off prototype of the BN7 Australian Formula 2 car of 1974. The BN6 designation has also been applied to the 1970-71 Rennmax sports racing car. (see Rennmax BN6 (Sports racing car) above).

=== Rennmax BN7 ===
The Rennmax BN7 was an Australian Formula 2 car of 1974, four of which were built.

=== Rennmax Vee (2nd series) ===
A second Formula Vee design was released in 1975. Fourteen examples were built.
