= 1970 Australian Formula 2 Championship =

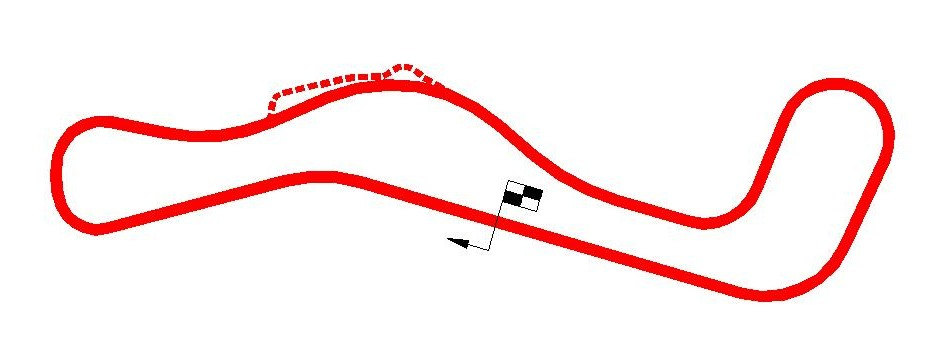
Layout of the Lakeside International Raceway

The 1970 Australian Formula 2 Championship was an Australian motor racing title for drivers of racing cars complying with Australian Formula 2 regulations. The title, which was recognised by the Confederation of Australian Motor Sport as the fourth Australian Formula 2 Championship, was decided over a single 40-lap, 60-mile (97 km) race, staged at the Lakeside circuit in Queensland, Australia on 27 September 1970. There were seven starters in the event.

The championship was won by Max Stewart driving a Mildren Waggott.

== Results ==
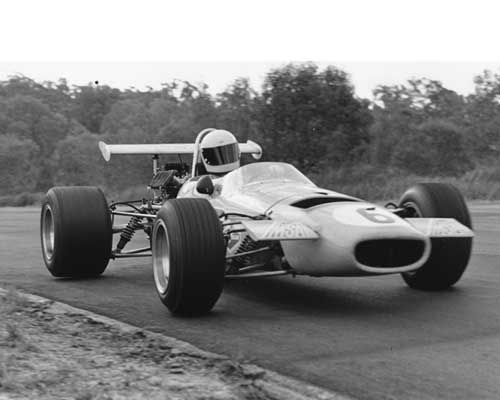
Max Stewart won the championship driving a Mildren Waggott TC4V. Car and driver are pictured above at Lakeside in 1971.

Position	Driver	No.	Car	Entrant	Laps
1	Max Stewart	6	Mildren Waggott TC4V	Alec Mildren Racing	40
2	John Walker		Elfin	Gilbert Motor Bodies	39
3	Jack Bono		Brabham BT6 Ford	J. Bono	38
4	Ken Goodwin		Rennmax	Peter Clarke Surfboards	38
5	Vern Hamilton	65	Elfin 600B	Vern Hamilton	38
6	Brian Power		Rennmax	Brian Power Shell Racing	38
DNF	Don Uebergang		Elfin 600B		

=== Notes ===
- Fastest lap: Max Stewart, 53.4s, (101.31 mph), new Australian Formula 2 lap record.
