= 1967 Surfers Paradise Four Hour =

Coordinates: 28°0′59″S 153°22′34″E

The 1967 Surfers Paradise Four Hour was an endurance race for “Production Touring Cars”, held at the Surfers Paradise International Raceway in Queensland, Australia on 9 April 1967. The race, which was organised by the Queensland Racing Drivers Club, was the first Surfers Paradise Four Hour, superseding the Lowood Four Hour race which had been run in 1964, 1965 and 1966.

Outright victory was awarded to the Alfa Romeo Giulia Super entered by Alec Mildren Racing Pty Ltd and driven by Kevin Bartlett and Doug Chivas.

== Class structure ==
Entries were divided into four classes based on price:

- Class A : Up to $1800
- Class B : $1801 to $2000
- Class C : $2001 to $2400
- Class D : Over $2401 to $4000

== Results ==
Position	Drivers	No.	Car	Entrant	Laps
	Class A				
1	G Scott, Bill Gates	13	Datsun Bluebird	Glyn Scott Motors	
2	Harry Cape, Ian Ferguson	12	Mitsubishi Colt Fastback	HC Cape	
3	M Byrne, T Hatton	11	Ford Cortina	BP Toowong Service Station	
?	John Roxburgh, Doug Whiteford	10	Datsun Bluebird	Datsun Racing Team	
	Class B				
1	P Cray, D Holland	22	Morris Cooper	G Stewart's Sports Car Centre	
2	J Hughes, D Lucas	20	Morris Cooper	Coorparoo Junction Service Station	
3	J Thomson, B Romano	23	Ford Cortina	Jeff Thompson	
4	P Harrison, B Arentz	21	Ford Cortina 220	PJ Harrison	
	Class C				
1	Graham Littlemore, Peter Lefrancke	38	Morris Cooper S	Janet McMenemy	131
2	Warren Gracie, Don James	36	Morris Cooper S	PG Lefranke	
3	Mal Brewster, Digby Cooke	31	Morris Cooper S	Marque Motors	
?	Joe Camilleri, Bob Moir	30	Morris Cooper S	JP Camilleri	
?	Peter Brown, Bob Cook	32	Morris Cooper S	Baulkham Hill Service Satation	
?	T Cavanagh, R Riley	33	Morris Cooper S	Best-Auto-Rebores	
?	Mike McGregor, J Lacey	34	Morris Cooper S	M McGregor	
?	J Leffler, L Carne	35	Morris Cooper S	John Leffler	
?	C Warnes, P Hunt	37	Morris Cooper S	CV Warnes	
	Class D				
1	Kevin Bartlett, Doug Chivas	40	Alfa Romeo Giulia Super	Alec Mildren Racing Pty Ltd	134
2	Frank Matich, Harry Firth	41	Ford XR Fairmont V8 Automatic	Ford Motor Company of Australia	131
3	Brian Lawler, H Gapps	42	Ford XR Falcon 500	Jubilee Motors Pty Ltd	
4	J Kinsley, P Finlay	43	Ford Cortina GT	Nuford Motors Pty Ltd	
5	Lionel Williams, Fay-Marie Strudwick	44	Holden HR X2	Howsans Garage	

Twenty two cars fronted for the race.

- Outright : Alec Mildren Racing Pty Ltd
- First Automatic: Ford Motor Co of Australia
- First Six Cylinder: Howsons Garage
