= 1969 Australian Formula 2 Championship =

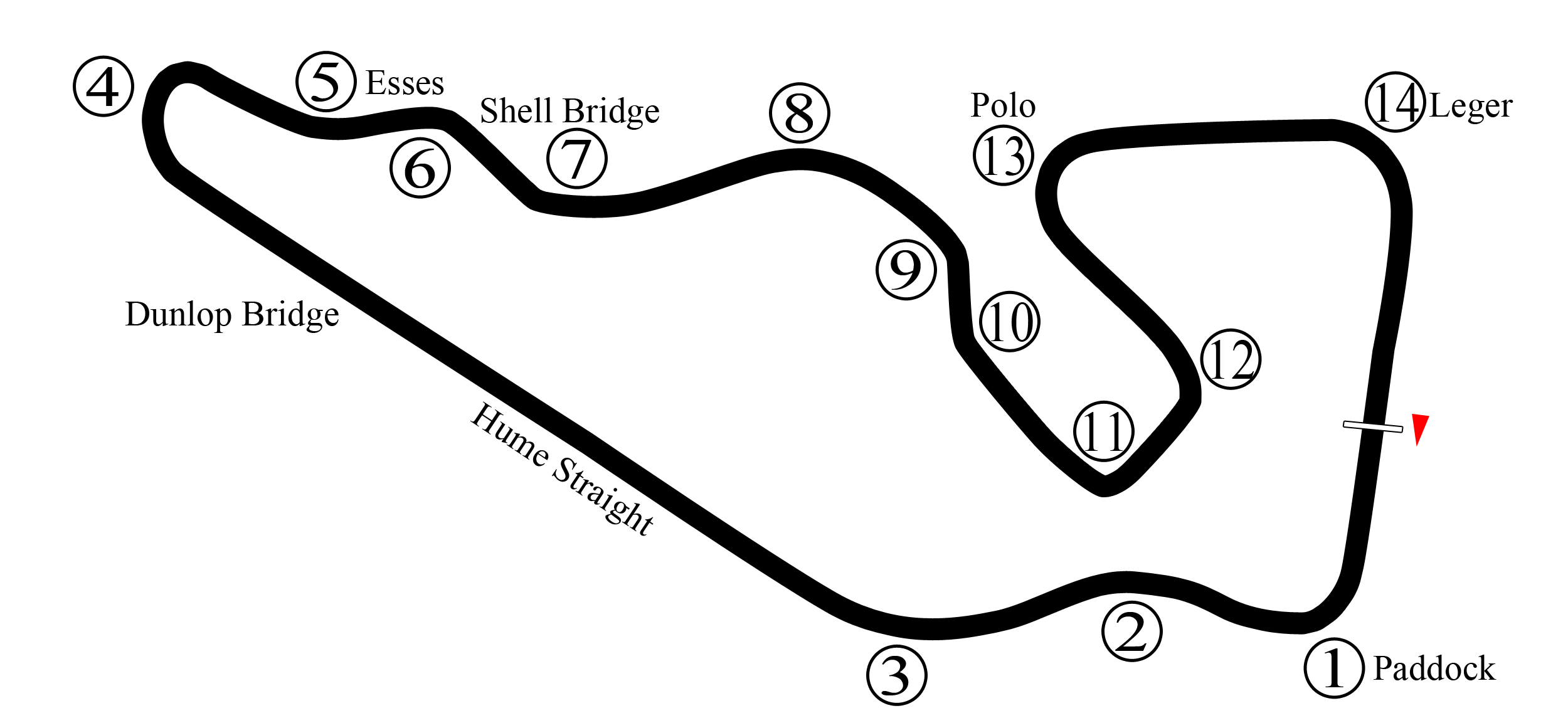
Layout of the Warwick Farm Raceway (1960-1973)

The 1969 Australian Formula 2 Championship was a CAMS sanctioned Australian motor racing title open to racing cars complying with Australian Formula 2. The title, which was the third Australian Formula 2 Championship, was contested concurrently with the 1969 Sam Hordern Memorial Trophy which was staged at Warwick Farm in New South Wales, Australia on 7 December 1969. The championship was won by Max Stewart driving a Mildren Waggott.

== Results ==
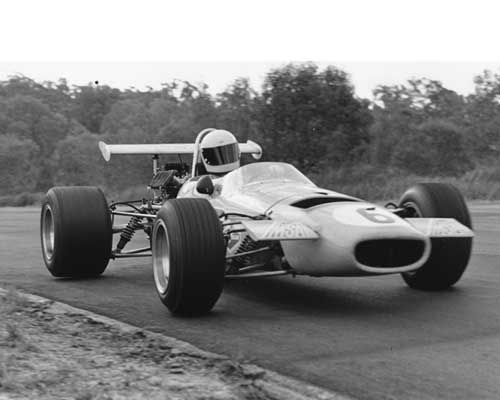
Championship winner Max Stewart in the Mildren Waggott, pictured in 1971

Position	Driver	No.	Car	Entrant	Laps
1	Max Stewart	6	Mildren Waggott	Alec Mildren Racing	45
2	Niel Allen	2	McLaren M4A Ford Cosworth FVA	NE Allen Competition	45
3	Ken Goodwin	14	Rennmax BN3 Ford	Peter Clark Surfboards	41
4	Ivan Tighe	12	Elfin 600B Ford	Ivan Tighe	41
5	Glyn Scott	20	Bowin P3 Ford Cosworth FVA	Glyn Scott Motors	40
6	Ian Ferguson	15	Bowin P3 Ford	Ian Ferguson	40
7	Alan Stewart	18	Monarch Ford	Alan Stewart	23
DNF	Alf Costanzo	8	McLaren M4A Ford Cosworth FVA	Argo Racing Pty Ltd	0

Note: The 1969 Sam Hordern Memorial Trophy, which incorporated the 1969 Australian Formula 2 Championship, was a round of the 1969 Australian Drivers' Championship. It was open to both Australian National Formula cars and Australian Formula 2 cars, however the former were not eligible for the Australian Formula 2 Championship and thus are not included in the above table.
