= Max Stewart =

Australian racing driver

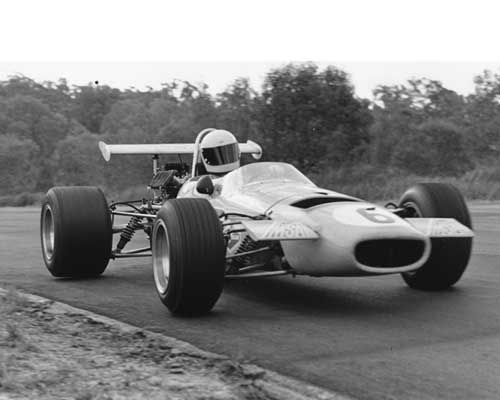
Max Stewart in the Alec Mildren Racing-entered Mildren Waggott TC4V at Lakeside International Raceway in 1971

Malcolm Clarke "Max" Stewart (14 March 1935 – 20 March 1977) was an Australian racing driver. He was known as the "Jolly Green Giant" for his disposition and height.

Stewart was born in Orange, New South Wales. He began his motorsport career racing motorcycles, being selected to represent Australia at the 1955 Isle of Man TT, but withdrew due to work commitments. After racing Karts and touring cars, he moved to open wheelers in 1965 with much success, winning the 1967 and 1968 Australian One and a Half Litre Championships. Stewart was selected to drive for Alec Mildren Racing, and went on to win the 1969 and 1970 Australian Formula 2 Championships driving a 1.6-litre Mildren Waggott. In 1970, he competed in a 2-litre Mildren Waggott in which he ran strongly in the 1970 Tasman Series with a number of podiums, and finished second to Jackie Stewart in the 1970 JAF Grand Prix for Formula Libre cars. He also won the 1971 Australian Drivers' Championship and the 1972 Singapore Grand Prix.

Stewart later raced a Lola T330, winning the 1974 Australian Drivers' Championship and the 1974 Australian Grand Prix. He then developed an initially troublesome Lola T400, winning the 1975 Australian Grand Prix and the 1975 Toby Lee Series. He led the 1976 Australian Grand Prix from Vern Schuppan and John Goss until he retired a few laps from the end.

Stewart lost his life on 20 March 1977, the day after being critically injured in an accident while practicing at Calder Park Raceway, near Melbourne. During a very wet practice session, an unsighted Stewart in his Lola had run into the back of Vern Schuppan's Elfin MR8.

== Career results ==
Year	Championship / Series	Position	Car	Entrant
1965	Australian Formula 2 Championship	2nd	Rennmax Ford	
1967	Australian Drivers' Championship	5th	Rennmax BN1 Ford	Max Stewart Motors
1967	Australian 1½ Litre Championship	1st	Rennmax BN1 Ford	Max Stewart Motors
1968	Australian Drivers' Championship	6th	Rennmax BN2 Ford	Max Stewart Motors
1968	Australian 1½ Litre Championship	1st	Rennmax BN2 Ford	Max Stewart Motors
1969	Tasman Series	13th	Mildren Alfa Romeo 1.6 L	Alec Mildren Racing
1969	Australian Drivers' Championship	3rd	Mildren Waggott TC4V	Alec Mildren Racing
1969	Australian Formula 2 Championship	1st	Mildren Waggott TC4V	Alec Mildren Racing
1970	Tasman Series	3rd	Mildren Waggott TC4V	Alec Mildren Racing
1970	Australian Drivers' Championship	2nd	Mildren Waggott TC4V	Alec Mildren Racing
1970	Australian Formula 2 Championship	1st	Mildren Waggott TC4V	Alec Mildren Racing
1971	Australian Drivers' Championship	1st	Mildren Waggott TC4V	Alec Mildren Racing; Max Stewart Motors
1972	Tasman Series	9th	Elfin MR5 Repco-Holden	Max Stewart Motors
1972	Australian Drivers' Championship	6th	Elfin MR5 Repco-Holden	Max Stewart Motors
1973	Tasman Series	6th	Lola T330 Chevrolet	Lola Cars Ltd
1973	Australian Drivers' Championship	7th	Lola T330 Chevrolet	Seiko Service Centre
1973	SCCA L&M Championship	12th	Lola T330 Chevrolet	Stewart Motors
1974	Tasman Series	2nd	Lola T330 Chevrolet	Max Stewart Motors
1974	Australian Drivers' Championship	1st	Lola T330 Chevrolet	Max Stewart Motors
1974	Australian Formula 2 Championship	12th	March 722 Ford	Max Stewart Motors
1975	Tasman Series	10th	Lola T400 Chevrolet	Max Stewart Motors
1975	Australian Drivers' Championship	3rd	Lola T400 Chevrolet	Sharp Racing Team
1975	Toby Lee Formula 5000 Series	1st	Lola T400 Chevrolet	
1976	Australian Drivers' Championship	2nd	Lola T400 Chevrolet	
1977	Rothmans International Series	4th	Lola T400 Chevrolet	Max Stewart

Sporting positions
Preceded by Leo Geoghegan	Winner of the Australian Drivers' Championship; 1971	Succeeded by Frank Matich
Preceded by Frank Matich	Winner of the Australian Drivers' Championship; 1974	Succeeded by John McCormack
Preceded by Graeme McRae	Winner of the Australian Grand Prix; 1974 and 1975	Succeeded by John Goss
