= 1971 Australian Drivers' Championship =

Motor racing competition

Seasons
- ← 1970 1972 →

The 1971 Australian Drivers’ Championship was a CAMS sanctioned motor racing title open to Australian Formula 1 and Australian Formula 2 racing cars. It was the fifteenth Australian Drivers' Championship and the first to feature cars complying with a new for 1971 Australian Formula 1 which permitted cars with production based V8 engines of up to 5 litre capacity (commonly known as Formula 5000 cars) or racing engines of up to eight cylinders and up to 2 litre capacity. The championship winner was awarded the 1971 CAMS Gold Star and the title of Australian Champion Driver.

The championship was won by Max Stewart from Kevin Bartlett, Alan Hamilton and John McCormack, with only two points separating first from fourth after the final race.

== Calendar ==
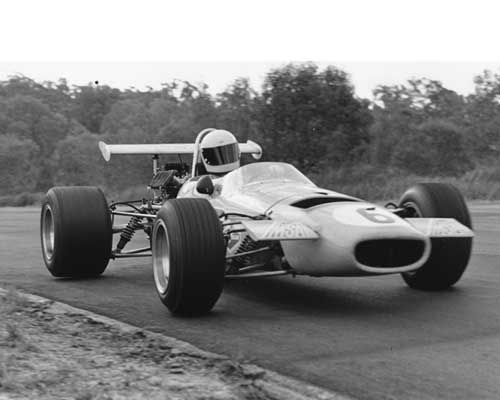
Max Stewart won the 1971 championship driving a Mildren Waggott

The championship was contested over a six race series. Races were staged concurrently with those of the 1971 Australian Formula 2 Championship

Race	Race name	Circuit	Date	Winning driver	Car
1	Governor's Trophy	Lakeside	6 June	Kevin Bartlett	McLaren M10B Chevrolet
2	Angus & Coote Diamond Trophy	Oran Park Raceway	27 June	Max Stewart	Mildren Waggott
3	Glynn Scott Memorial Trophy	Surfers Paradise International Raceway	29 August	Frank Matich	McLaren M10B Repco Holden
4	Victoria Trophy	Sandown	12 September	Kevin Bartlett	McLaren M10B Chevrolet
5	Examiner 1000	Symmons Plains	25 September	Tony Stewart	Elfin 600B England
6	Rothmans Trophy	Mallala Race Circuit	11 October	John McCormack	Elfin MR5 Repco Holden

== Points system ==
Championship points were awarded on a 9-6-4-3-2-1 basis to the first six placegetters in each race. Each driver could retain points only from his/her best five race results. Only holders of a General Competition License issued by CAMS were eligible to compete for the title.

== Championship standings ==
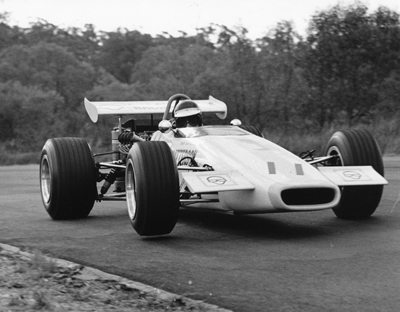
Henk Woelders (Elfin 600C) contesting the opening race of the 1971 Australian Drivers' Championship

Position	Driver	Car	Entrant	Lak	Ora	Sur	San	Sym	Mal	Total
1	Max Stewart	Mildren Waggott	Alec Mildren Racing; Max Stewart Motors	6	9	3	-	1	4	23
2	Kevin Bartlett	McLaren M10B Chevrolet	Kevin Bartlett Shell Racing	9	-	4	9	-	-	22
=	Alan Hamilton	McLaren M10B Chevrolet	Porsche Distributors Racing	4	6	6	-	-	6	22
4	John McCormack	Elfin MR5 Repco Holden	Elfin Sports Cars	-	-	-	6	6	9	21
5	Tony Stewart	Elfin 600B England Ford	Paul England Pty Ltd	3	3	-	-	9	1	16
6	Henk Woelders	Elfin 600C Waggott	Bill Patterson Racing	1	4	1	3	-	2	11
7	Warwick Brown	McLaren M4A Cosworth	Pat Burke Racing	-	-	2	4	4	-	10
8	Frank Matich	McLaren M10B Repco Holden	Rothmans Team Matich	-	-	9	-	-	-	9
9	Jack Bono	Elfin 600B Ford	Graham Collier	-	2	-	2	2	-	6
10	Garrie Cooper	Elfin 600B Lotus	Elfin Sports Cars	-	-	-	-	3	-	3
=	Colin Hyams	Lola T192 Chevrolet	Colin Hyams	-	-	-	-	-	3	3
12	Ivan Tighe	Elfin 600B Ford	Ivan Tighe	2	-	-	-	-	-	2
13	John Walker	Elfin 600C Ford	City State Racing Team	-	1	-	-	-	-	1
=	John Ampt	Elfin Mono IIB Ford	John Ampt	-	-	-	1	-	-	1

New Zealander Graeme Lawrence (Brabham BT30 Ford) placed second at Oran Park, but not being an Australian resident he did not qualify for championship points.
