= Mildren (racing cars) =

Series of racing vehicles

The Mildren name was used on a series of racing vehicles constructed for, or acquired by, Australian racing team owner Alec Mildren during the 1960s and early 1970s.

== Mildren Maserati ==
The Mildren Maserati was a one-off sports car which was built in 1964, utilizing a clone of a Lotus 19 chassis with components from a Cooper T51 and a 2.9 litre Maserati Type 61 engine. The chassis was constructed by Bob Britton, who also produced racing cars under the Rennmax name. The car was driven to victory in the 1965 Victorian Sports Car Championship by Kevin Bartlett. It was also favoured to win the 1965 Australian Tourist Trophy in the hands of Frank Gardner, but it failed to start the race after an engine failure in a preliminary heat.

The Mildren Maserati was sold to Tasmanian Ross Ambrose in 1966 and was subsequently fitted with a 2.2-litre Coventry Climax engine and raced as the Rennmax-Climax. In 1969 Ambrose had the car re-engined with a 4.4 litre Traco-Oldsmobile powerplant and then race it as the Traco-Rennmax.

== Mildren Waggott (Rennmax BN3) ==
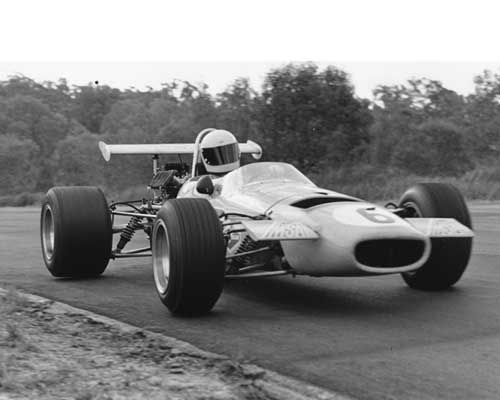
Max Stewart won the 1971 Australian Drivers' Championship at the wheel of the Mildren Waggott

The Mildren Waggott was a space frame open wheeler racing car built by Bob Britton for Alec Mildren Racing, as one of a number of cars built to the Rennmax BN3 design, which itself was derived from the Brabham BT23. Originally powered by a 1.6 litre Alfa Romeo engine, the car was driven by Max Stewart in the 1969 Tasman Series, but a lack of power and high oil use by the Alfa engine saw the car subsequently fitted with a 1.6 litre Waggott engine.

Stewart drove the car to victory in the 1969 Australian Formula 2 Championship, the 1970 Australian Formula 2 Championship and the 1971 Australian Drivers' Championship, with a 2.0 litre Waggott engine called the TC4V being used to win the third title. Stewart also won the 1972 Singapore Grand Prix with the car which was Ford powered for this race.

== Mildren Mono ==
The Mildren Mono was a monocoque open wheeler racing car which was designed by Len Bailey and built by Alan Mann Racing. The Mono, which replaced the teams old Formula 2 chassis, the 1965 model Brabham BT16 and its 2.5L Coventry Climax engine (the Brabham Climax was sold to race driver Col Green), debuted in late 1968 at Warwick Farm Raceway in the hands of Frank Gardner and was powered by the 315 bhp (235 kW; 319 PS), 2.5 L (2,462 cc) Alfa Romeo Tipo 33 V8 engine, the same as which was already in use in the teams other car, a Formula 2 Brabham BT23D. As the official Australian Alfa Romeo importer, Alec Mildren was able to obtain the V8 engines from the Autodelta which was the same one as used in Alfa's 1967 model T33/2 Daytona 2.5L endurance racing sports car. Kevin Bartlett drove the car to victory in the 1969 Australian Drivers' Championship utilizing the Alfa Romeo engine and 4 cylinder, four valve per cylinder Waggott engines of 1850cc and 2 litre capacity.

For racing in 1969, the Mildren Mono-Alfa Romeo was fitted with high front and rear wings, with Bartlett telling that the teams Brabham BT23D was the first open wheel race car in Australia to use wings during the 1968 Australian Drivers' Championship. For the 1969 Tasman Series Frank Gardner drove the Mono Alfa while Bartlett drove the Brabham Alfa. Although the combination was to prove the fastest of the "local" entries, the Alfa V8 lacked the pace of the Cosworth DFV derived DFW V8 (rated at ~360 bhp (268 kW; 365 PS)) and V6 Ferrari's (rated at 300 bhp (224 kW; 304 PS)) powered cars. After racing in all 8 series events, Gardner was the highest placed Australian in 6th place.

Following the Tasman Series, Gardner as per usual returned to his London base while Kevin Bartlett took over the Mono and with it won the 1969 Macau Grand Prix, becoming the first Australian to win the race. In 1969 Bartlett also raced the Mildren Mono-Alfa in the inaugural JAF Grand Prix held to Formula Libre rules allowing for Formula 2, 2.5L and 1.6L cars. The race was held at the Fuji Speedway in Japan (in its original configuration with the 30° banked first turn). There he qualified the car in 4th place, being fastest after the first qualifying session. However, a burned piston after setting his fastest lap put him out for the rest of qualifying and saw him drop to 4th on the grid. The race ended early for the Mildren Mono-Alfa after the replacement engine fitted overnight also burned a piston.

In winning the 1969 Australian Drivers' Championship, defending champion Bartlett (having used the Brabham BT23D-Alfa Romeo V8 in 1968) alternated in using the Alfa Romeo V8 and a 2.0L Waggott TC4V engine, with the Alfa in the Mono for the power circuits such as Symmons Plains, Sandown and Surfers, with the smaller and lighter Waggott fitted for the tighter tracks at Mallala and the team's home base of Sydney at Warwick Farm.

By 1970 the Mono was in the hands of Sydney driver Bob Muir. In two known races with the car, he qualified the Mono (fitted with a 2 litre Waggott) 12th for the 1970 Australian Grand Prix at Warwick Farm Raceway, but his race ended on lap 15 when he crashed the car. He also drove the Mono in the 1971 Australian Grand Prix, also held at Sydney's Warwick Farm. Against the much more powerful Formula 5000 cars, Muir put the Mono-Waggott on the front row of the grid, less than a second behind the F5000 of defending (and eventual) race winner Frank Matich in his self-designed Matich A50 powered by a Repco-Holden V8. His race however was a disaster. Before completing the first lap, Muir was into the pits to retire, the Waggott TC4V engine having a bent valve.

The Mono was later raced as a Ford powered Australian Formula 2 car by Ray Winter, finishing third in the rain-affected 1975 Australian Grand Prix at Surfers Paradise against a field composed primarily of "Formula 5000" cars.

The car was commonly referred to as the "Yellow Submarine", due to the Mildren team cars generally being painted yellow.

== Mildren Chevrolet ==
The Mildren Chevrolet was a Chevrolet powered monocoque Formula 5000 racing car, designed by Len Bailey with assistance from Frank Gardner. The car was driven by Kevin Bartlett in the 1970 Australian Grand Prix, but failed to finish. It was also driven by Bartlett in the 1971 Tasman Series, with Bartlett placing seventh in that series.
