= Waggott Engineering =

Waggott Engineering was an Australian automotive engineering company which gained fame for the engines which it produced for motor sport applications from the 1950s through to the 1970s. The company had its origins in a machine shop opened in 1948 by Merv Waggott. Initially concentrating on commercial refrigerator repairs and general engineering it later diversified into the production of after-market parts for automotive and motor sport applications. This was followed in the mid-1950s by the development and production of the Waggott TC engine. Although based on the six-cylinder Holden “Grey” motor it was extensively modified with twin overhead camshafts, a special crankshaft and three twin choke Weber carburettors. As fitted to the Centaur Waggot in which John French won the 1962 Australian GT Championship, the engine was producing 202 bhp, over three times the 62 bhp output of the standard Holden unit.

The Waggott TC4V engine followed in 1968. This was developed from the four-cylinder Ford Cortina engine block with the addition of a new head design featuring twin overhead camshafts and four valves per cylinder. The TC4V saw success in 1600cc form in Australian Formula 2 racing and in 2000cc form in Australian Formula 1. A 1600cc variant with two valves per cylinder was produced to meet new, more restrictive Australian Formula 2 regulations which applied from 1971.

At this time Waggott Engineering were specialising in camshaft development but also offered automotive “balancing, boring and dyno tuning services”. Although founder Merv Waggott was to die in a plane crash in 1982, the company continued and is now trading as Waggott Cams and headed by Merv’s son Peter.

== Championships ==
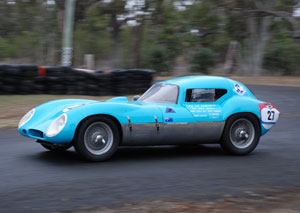
The Waggott TC powered Centaur in which John French won the 1962 Australian GT Championship

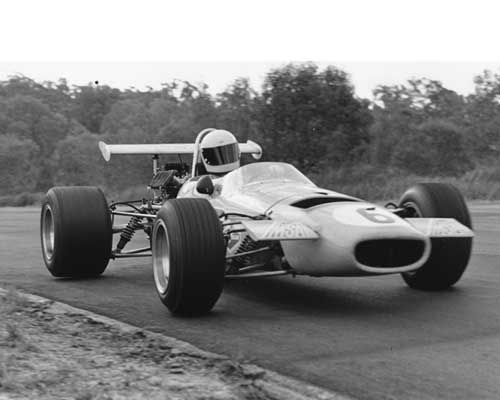
The Waggott TC4V powered Mildren in which Max Stewart won the 1971 Australian Drivers' Championship

The following Australian motor racing championships were won with Waggott powered cars.

Championship	Driver	Car
1962 Australian GT Championship	John French	Centaur Waggott TC
1969 Australian Formula 2 Championship	Max Stewart	Mildren Waggott TC4V
1970 Australian Drivers' Championship	Leo Geoghegan	Lotus 59B Waggott TC4V
1970 Australian Formula 2 Championship	Max Stewart	Mildren Waggott TC4V
1971 Australian Drivers' Championship	Max Stewart	Mildren Waggott TC4V
1971 Australian Formula 2 Championship	Henk Woelders	Elfin 600C Waggott
