= Alec Mildren =

Australian racing driver (1915–1998)

- Nationality: Australian
- Born: Alec Graham Mildren; 19 August 1915 Burwood, New South Wales, Australia
- Died: 28 August 1998 (aged 83)

Australian Drivers' Championship
- Years active: 1957 to 1961
- Best finish: 1st in 1960 Australian Drivers' Championship

Championship titles
- 1960 1960: Australian Drivers' Championship; Australian Grand Prix

Alec Graham Mildren (19 August 1915 – 28 August 1998) was active in Australian motor racing as a driver from 1938 to 1961, and subsequently as the owner of Alec Mildren Racing.

== Racing career ==
Mildren began his racing career in an Austin in 1938 and then raced a variety of cars including a Singer, a Ford Special, an MG TB and two Rileys. These were followed by a series of Coopers, with Mildren placing second in both the 1958 and 1959 Australian Drivers' Championships. A Maserati powered Cooper T51 was campaigned during 1960, Mildren winning the 1960 Australian Grand Prix and the 1960 Australian Drivers' Championship. He retired from racing during 1961.

=== Career results ===
Season	Championship	Position	Car	Entrant
1957	Australian Drivers' Championship	10th	Cooper T20 Bristol; Cooper T41 Coventry Climax	AG Mildren
1958	Australian Drivers' Championship	2nd	Cooper T43 Coventry Climax	AG Mildren Pty Ltd
1959	Australian Drivers' Championship	2nd	Cooper T43 Coventry Climax; Cooper T45 Coventry Climax	AG Mildren Pty Ltd
1960	Australian Drivers' Championship	1st	Cooper T51 Maserati	AG Mildren Pty Ltd
1961	Australian Drivers' Championship	5th	Cooper T51 Maserati	AG Mildren Pty Ltd

== Alec Mildren Racing ==
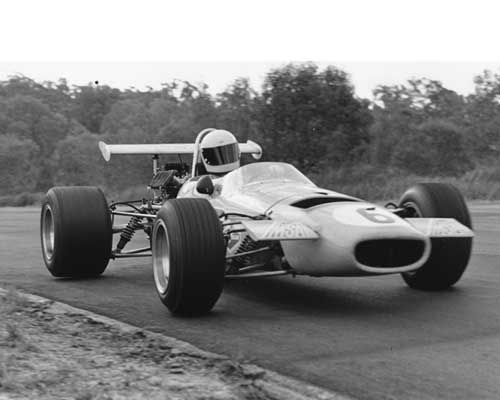
Max Stewart in the Alec Mildren Racing entered Mildren Waggott in 1971

In late 1963 Mildren announced the formation of Alec Mildren Racing. The team met with success in Australian endurance races, winning the 1964 Sandown 6 Hour International, the 1965 International 6 Hour Touring Car Race and the 1967 Surfers Paradise Four Hour with Alfa Romeos. Kevin Bartlett won the 1968 Australian Drivers' Championship in an Alec Mildren Racing entered Brabham and the 1969 Australian Drivers' Championship in the team's Mildren Mono. The latter was one of a number of cars raced by the team under the Mildren marque name. Max Stewart won the 1969 and 1970 Australian Formula 2 Championships in the team's Mildren Waggott and then won the 1971 Australian Drivers' Championship in the same car, entered by Alec Mildren Racing in early rounds of the series and by Max Stewart Motors in later rounds.

Racing for Alec Mildren at the Bathurst Easter meeting in 1967, Kevin Bartlett set the first ever 100 mph (161 km/h) lap of the then 6.172 km (3.835 mi) Mount Panorama Circuit with a time of 2:17.7 in a 2.5-litre Brabham Coventry-Climax during the NSW Road Racing Championships. For his efforts Bartlett was awarded 100 bottles of champagne to add to the 20 bottles he had been awarded for winning the pole with a time of 2:17.2. On the same day Bartlett also drove one of Mildren's Alfa Romeo GTA's to victory in the touring car race over the Ford Mustang of Bob Jane who while having a power advantage with the Ford V8 engine, ran out of brakes at the end of the 4th lap. During the race Bartlett reduced Under 2.0 Litre lap record by some 9 seconds in the process, leaving the new mark at 2:44.9.

According to Kevin Bartlett, the reason that the Mildren team cars were always painted yellow was because Alec Mildren sometimes confessed that as he got older, his eyesight wasn't 100% anymore. One day while boarding a plane at Sydney Airport, Mildren noticed one of the airport service vehicles standing out as it was painted bright yellow. After seeing this he went and found out where they got the paint for their service vehicles and from then on, the Mildren Racing cars stood out in their bright DCA yellow against other racing cars of the day which were generally either black, white, racing (dark) green or racing (dark) blue.

== Business interests ==
A family car dealership company, which was established by Mildren in 1953 and would later have prestige dealerships for Saab and Volvo Mildren Prestige operated up until 2017.

Sporting positions
Preceded by Len Lukey	Winner of the Australian Drivers' Championship; 1960	Succeeded by Bill Patterson
Preceded by Stan Jones	Winner of the Australian Grand Prix; 1960	Succeeded by Lex Davison
