= Australian Formula 1 =

Australian motor racing category

Motor racing formula
- Category: Open wheel car
- Country or region: Australia
- Championships: Australian Drivers' Championship
- Inaugural season: 1970
- Status: Defunct
- Folded: 1983

Australian Formula 1 (AF1) was a motor sport category for open-wheeler racing cars which was current in Australia from 1970 to 1983.

AF1 was introduced by the Confederation of Australian Motor Sport in 1970, initially restricting cars to non-supercharged engines of no greater than 2.5-litre capacity, running on commercial fuel. AF1 was essentially a new name for the Australian National Formula which had been Australia’s premier racing category from 1964 to 1969.

Effective 23 February 1971, AF1 was changed to a two-part formula catering for racing cars fitted with 5.0-litre production based pushrod V8 engines (internationally known as Formula 5000 cars) and those fitted with less-restricted non-supercharged engines of eight or fewer cylinders and no more than 2-litre capacity. The smaller engine option was discontinued after 1976. The main engines used were Chevrolet and Repco-Holden V8s, though occasionally a Ford V8 was seen in action without success.

In March 1979, Formula Pacific cars (using 1.6-litre production-based four-cylinder engines) became eligible for Australian Formula 1 alongside the existing 5.0-litre cars and 1980 saw the addition of 3.0-litre FIA Formula One cars to the mix. For 1982, Australian Formula 1 was restricted to Formula Pacific cars only. In 1983 CAMS adopted Formula Mondial as the new Australian Formula 1 but allowed cars complying with Formula Pacific to compete alongside the new cars for that year. (Formula Mondial was an FIA approved international formula very similar to Formula Pacific but with cars restricted to using the 1.6-litre Ford Cosworth BDA four-cylinder engine.) For 1984 CAMS changed the category name from “Australian Formula 1” to “Formula Mondial”.

The Australian Drivers' Championship (for the CAMS Gold Star award) was open to drivers of AF1 cars throughout the life of the formula, i.e. from 1970 to 1983. During those years the term Australian Formula 1 Championship was often used in lieu of Australian Drivers Championship however the latter is used by the Confederation of Australian Motor Sport in its official records of the championship.

The Australian Grand Prix was contested by AF1 cars during the years 1970 to 1983 inclusive, although the 1970 event also permitted Formula 5000 cars and the 1981 race was restricted to cars complying with the Formula Pacific section of AF1.

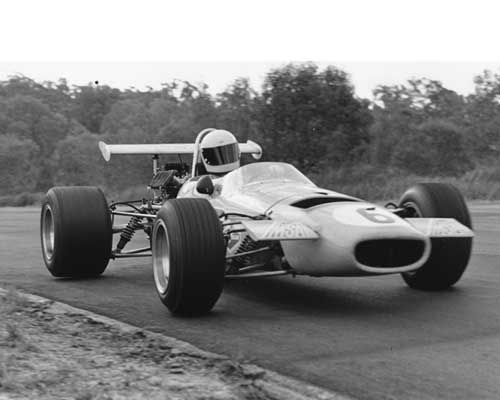
2 litre Mildren Waggott AF1 car with which Max Stewart won the 1971 Australian Drivers' Championship

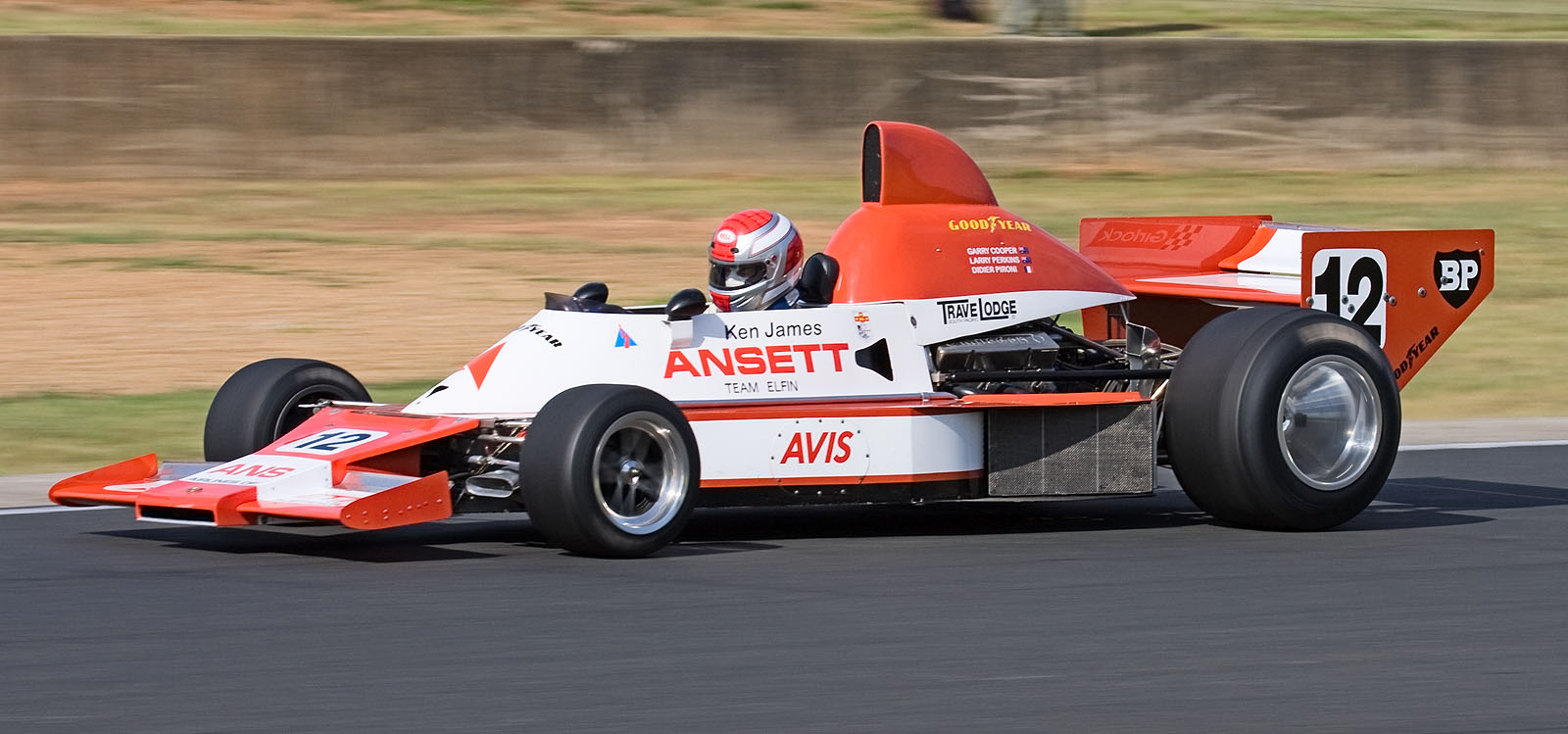
5 litre Elfin MR8 Chevrolet AF1 car
