= Lola T400 =

1973 English formula 5000 racing car

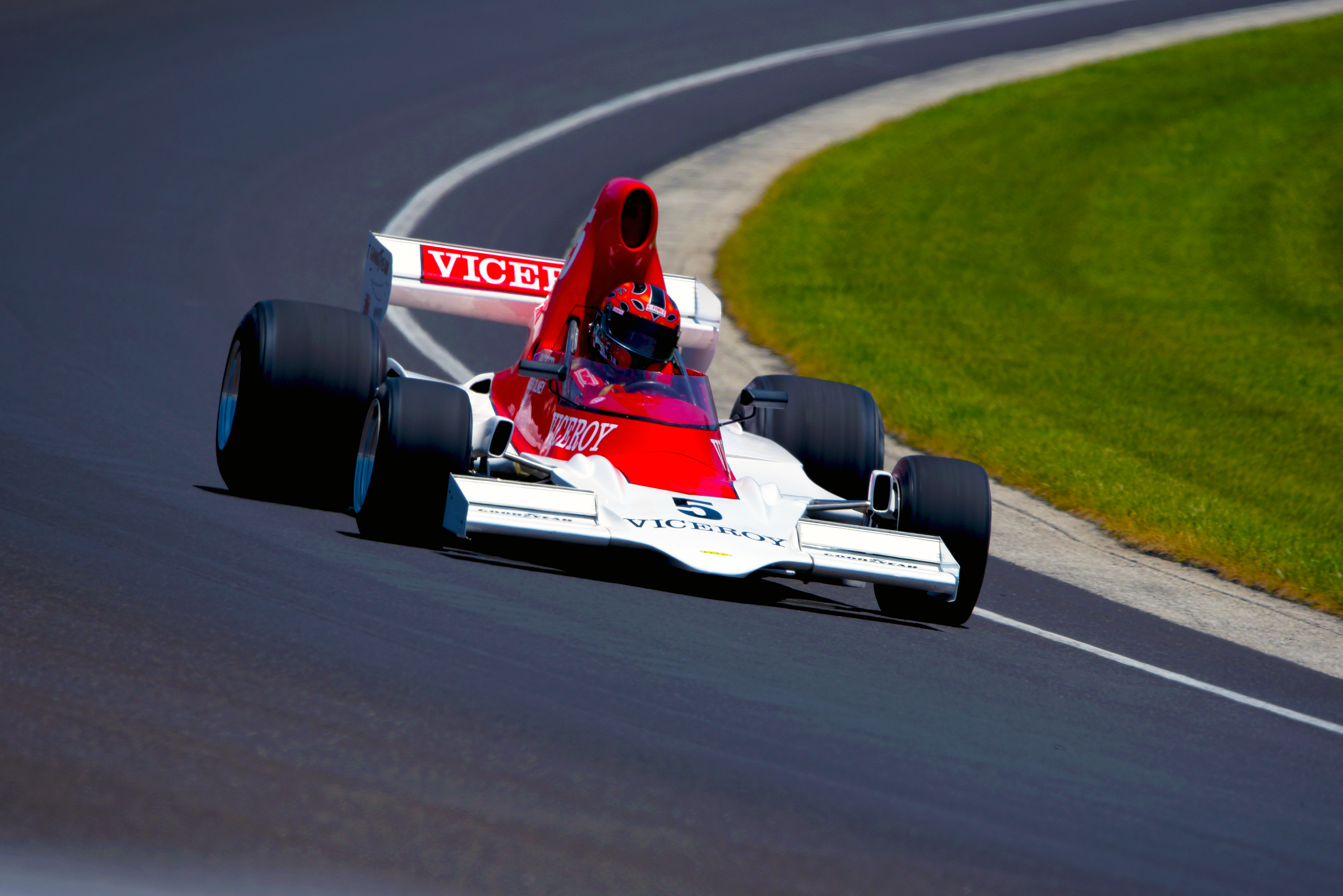
- Category: Formula 5000
- Constructor: Lola Cars
- Designer: Eric Broadley

Technical specifications
- Chassis: Steel and aluminium monocoque with load-bearing engine-transmission assembly
- Suspension: Inboard springs and Fox shocks front and rear, operated by top rocker arm with front and lower rear A arms of streamline tubing
- Engine: mid-engine, longitudinally mounted, 4,940 cc (301.5 cu in), Chevrolet, 90° V8, NA mid-engine, longitudinally mounted, 4,994 cc (304.8 cu in), Repco Holden, 90° V8, NA
- Transmission: Hewland DG300 Five-speed manual
- Weight: 665 kg (1,466 lb)

Competition history
- Notable entrants: Vel's Parnelli Jones Racing
- Notable drivers: Mario Andretti; Al Unser
- Debut: 1973

After the great success of the T332 in the 1974 Formula 5000 season (18 out of 21 top 3 finishes in the US), much was expected of the new high-tech Lola T400. Described by development driver Frank Gardner as "the most sophisticated Formula 5000 to be built so far", the T400 was a completely new design, strikingly different from its T300, T330 and T332 predecessors.

== Description ==
Built with a heavily revised aerodynamics and suspension system, the T400 baffled and perplexed teams. The radiators were mounted in front of the rear wheels, as part of the mandatory deformable structure, so the aerodynamics could be significantly cleaner. However, the key difference was designer Eric Broadley's adoption of rising rate suspension, with rocker arms and inboard springs, both at the front and the rear. This would, eventually, prove very successful, but at first nobody really understood how to make it work.

== Shock absorbers ==
This design was not only the first to move the shock absorbers inside the bodywork, and out of the air-stream, but both mounting points of the shocks moved with the suspension, increasing the spring rate and shock damping with the movement, and therefore referred to as "rising rate". Haas and Vel's Parnelli Jones, the top two US teams, quickly forgot about their T400s and wheeled out their 1974 T332s. In Australia, the two leading drivers had returned to their earlier cars mid-way through the Tasman series but later persevered with the T400s and eventually made winning cars out of them. In the UK, VDS also pressed on and got one of their cars working really well at the end of the season; four wins in the last eight races securing a second F5000 title for Teddy Pilette. Of 27 top 3 finishes in the US, the T332 took 20, including all nine wins, the T400 just three and everyone else put together shared the other four.

== Suspension system ==
Eventually, the very advanced and complex suspension system was figured out by Lola and updates and chassis setup instructions tamed the beast. However, the US series ended in 1976, so little time was available to demonstrate the T400's full potential. In recent years sophisticated computer modeling has been used to further enhance the T400's chassis performance. Two of the 14 T400s were wrecked in accidents, but the recent whereabouts of all twelve of the survivors are known.
