= 1974 Oran Park 100 =

1974 Oran Park 100 Grand Prix
- Race 5 of 8 in 1974 Tasman Series

Race details
- Date: February 3, 1974
- Official name: Oran Park 100
- Location: Oran Park Raceway, Sydney, New South Wales
- Course: Permanent racing facility
- Course length: 1.960 km (1.218 miles)
- Distance: 90 laps, 176.40 km (109.20 miles)
- Weather: Sunny

Pole position
Driver	(Australia) John McCormack	Elfin MR5
- Time: 39.900

Fastest lap
Driver	(Australia) Johnnie Walker	Lola T330
- Time: 40.000

Podium
First	(Australia) Max Stewart	Lola T330
Second	(Australia) Johnnie Walker	Lola T330
Third	(Australia) Warwick Brown	Lola T332

The 1974 Oran Park 100, one of three races marketed as the Peter Stuyvesant $100,000 was the fifth round of the 1974 Tasman Series. It was open to racing cars complying with the Tasman Formula, which permitted Formula 5000-style cars and 2-litre cars. The race and was held at Oran Park Raceway on 3 February 1974.

It was held on the same circuit that would in November be used for the Australian Grand Prix. Australian driver Max Stewart won the race and would go on to win the Grand Prix as well.

== Classification ==
Pos	Driver	Car	Laps	Time
1	(Australia) Max Stewart	Lola T330 / Chevrolet 4995cc V8	90	1h 01m 22.0s
2	(Australia) Johnnie Walker	Lola T330 / Repco 4994cc V8	90	
3	(Australia) Warwick Brown	Lola T332 / Chevrolet 4995cc V8	90	
4	(Australia) John McCormack	Elfin MR5 / Repco 4994cc V8	90	
5	(United Kingdom) Peter Gethin	Chevron B24 / Chevrolet 4995cc V8	90	
6	(Belgium) Teddy Pilette	Chevron B24 / Chevrolet 4995cc V8	90	
7	(New Zealand) Graeme Lawrence	Lola T332 / Chevrolet 4995cc V8	90	
8	(Australia) John Leffler	March 722 / Cosworth 1790cc 4cyl	87	
9	(Australia) Garrie Cooper	Elfin MR5 / Repco 4994cc V8	83	
10	(New Zealand) Baron Robertson	Elfin MR5 / Repco 4994cc V8	73	
Ret	(Australia) Bob Muir	Matich A52 / Repco 4994cc V8	69	Fuel Pump
Ret	(New Zealand) David Oxton	Begg FM5 / Chevrolet 4995cc V8	48	Rocker Stud
Ret	(New Zealand) Garry Pedersen	McLaren M18 / Chevrolet 4995cc V8	48	Driveshaft
Ret	(Australia) Errol Richardson	Wortmeyer SCV / Chevrolet 4995cc V8	5	Accelerator
DSQ	(New Zealand) Graham McRae	McRae GM2 / Chevrolet 4995cc V8	4	Disqualified
