= 1979 Rothmans International Series =

Seasons
- ← 1978 none →

The 1979 Rothmans International Series was an Australian motor racing series open to Australian Formula 5000, World Formula 1 and Australian Formula Pacific cars. It was the fourth and final Rothmans International Series.

Despite his best placing in the series being a 2nd in the final round at Oran Park, the series was won by ex-F1 driver Larry Perkins driving an Australian designed and built Elfin MR8 Chevrolet.

The series included three Formula One cars, though only one featured prominently in the series. Irishman David Kennedy drove a Wolf WR4 powered by the Cosworth DFV to 4th place in the series including winning the Surfers Paradise round and setting the circuits outright lap record of 1:04.400 seconds (this record wasn't beaten until 1986). English driver Geoff Lees drove a Cosworth powered Ensign MN09, though luck deserted him after a second place finished in the opening round at Sandown in Melbourne and he only finished 11th in the series. The third F1 car was driven by Adelaide based driver John McCormack. His was a McLaren M23, converted to F5000 specification and powered by a Repco-Leyland V8. The 1973 British Grand Prix winning McLaren suffering unreliability until the final round at Oran Park where it scored a 5th placed finish giving McCormack 9th place in the series.

== Calendar ==
The series was contested over four rounds with one race per round.

Round	Circuit	Date	Winning driver	Car	Entrant
1	Sandown Park	4 February	Alfredo Costanzo	Lola T430 Chevrolet	Porsche Cars Australia
2	Adelaide International Raceway	11 February	Alfredo Costanzo	Lola T430 Chevrolet	Porsche Cars Australia
3	Surfers Paradise	18 February	David Kennedy	Wolf WR4 Ford Cosworth DFV	Theodore Racing
4	Oran Park	25 February	Warwick Brown	Lola T332 Chevrolet	Racing Team VDS

== Points system ==
Points were awarded on a 10-9-8-7-6-5-4-3-2-1 basis for the first ten places at each of the first three rounds.

Points were awarded on a 15-14-13-12-11-10-9-8-7-6-5-4-3-2-1 basis for the first fifteen places at the fourth round.

== Series results ==
Position	Driver	No.	Car	Entrant	San	Ade	Sur	Ora	Total points
1	Larry Perkins	12	Elfin MR8 Chevrolet	Ansett Team Elfin	4	8	9	14	35
2	Alfredo Costanzo	84	Lola T430 Chevrolet	Porsche Cars Australia	10	10	8	-	28
3	Warwick Brown	111	Lola T332 Chevrolet	Racing Team VDS	-	-	7	15	22
4	David Kennedy	6	Wolf WR4 Ford Cosworth DFV	Theodore Racing	8	-	10	-	18
=	John Wright	76	Lola T400 Chevrolet	J Wright	-	5	-	13	18
6	Colin Bond	14	Brabham BT43 Chevrolet	Thomson Motor Auctions Pty Ltd	-	2	-	12	14
7	Colin Trengrove	34	Lola T332 Chevrolet	Trengrove Racing Cars	-	3	-	10	13
8	Vern Schuppan	11	Elfin MR8 Chevrolet	Ansett Team Elfin	6	-	6	-	12
9	John McCormack	7	McLaren M23 Repco Leyland	McCormack Uniparts Team	-	-	-	11	11
10	Graham McRae	1	McRae GM3 Chevrolet	Thomson Motor Auctions Pty Ltd	3	7	-	-	10
11	Geoff Lees	8	Ensign MN09 Ford Cosworth DFV	Theodore Racing	9	-	-	-	9
=	John Walker	25	Lola T332 Chevrolet	Magnum Wheels	-	9	-	-	9
=	Bob Johns	32	Ralt RT1 Ford	G Johns	-	-	-	9	9
=	Jim Richards	9	Matich A53 Repco Holden	J Richards	5	-	4	-	9
15	Kevin Bartlett	3	Lola T400 Chevrolet	Thomson Motor Auctions Pty Ltd	7	-	-	-	7
=	Rob Butcher	10	Lola T332 Chevrolet	R Butcher	1	6	-	-	7
17	Jon Davison	24	Lola T332 Chevrolet	JD Davison	-	-	5	-	5
18	Bob Creasy	16	Birrana 273 Ford	Robert Creasy	-	4	-	-	4
19	Salt Walther	77	McRae GM1 Chevrolet	Thomson Motor Auctions Pty Ltd	-	-	3	-	3
20	Terry Hook	15	Lola T332 Chevrolet	TA Hook	2	-	-	-	2
=	Barry Singleton	19	Gardos BL1 Repco Holden	Barry Singleton Motors	-	-	2	-	2
22	Ivan Tighe	38	Chevron B37 Chevrolet	B Allison	-	-	1	-	1
