= 1977 Rothmans International Series =

Seasons
- ← 1976 1978 →

The 1977 Rothmans International Series was an Australian motor racing competition open to Formula 5000 Racing Cars. The series, which was the second Rothmans International Series, was won by Warwick Brown driving a Lola T430 Chevrolet.

== Schedule ==
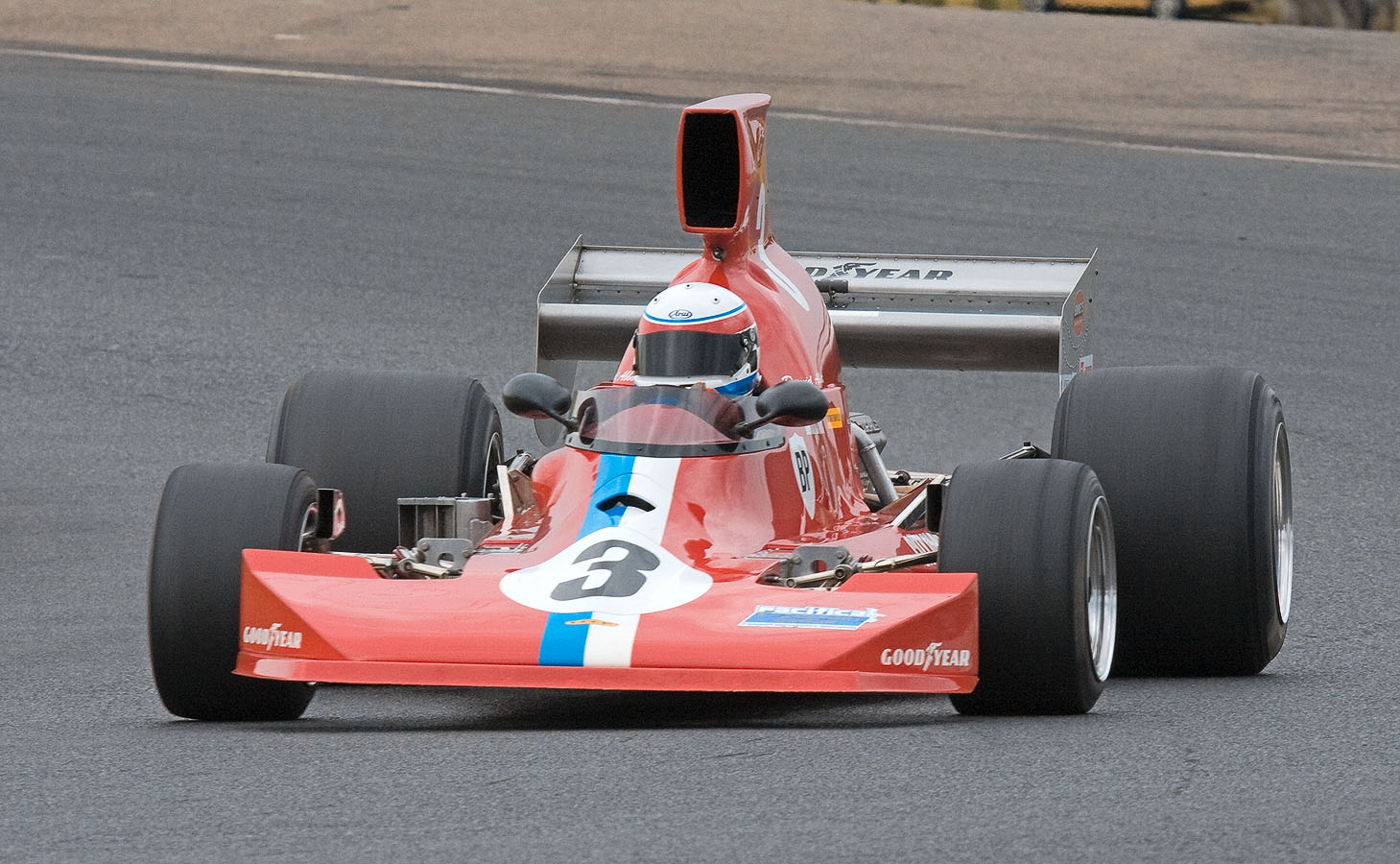
Warwick Brown won the series driving this Lola T430 (pictured in 2008)

The series was contested over four rounds with one race per round.

Round	Name	Circuit	Date	Winning driver	Car	Report
1	Australian Grand Prix	Oran Park	6 February	Warwick Brown	Lola T430 Chevrolet	Report
2		Surfers Paradise	13 February	Warwick Brown	Lola T430 Chevrolet	
3		Sandown Park	20 February	Max Stewart	Lola T400 Chevrolet	
4		Adelaide International Raceway	27 February	Alan Jones	Lola T332C Chevrolet	

== Points system ==
Series points were awarded on a 9-6-4-3-2-1 basis for the first six places at each round.

== Series results ==
Position	Driver	Car	Entrant	Ora	Sur	San	Ade	Total
1	Warwick Brown	Lola T430 Chevrolet	Racing Team VDS	9	9	-	6	24
2	Peter Gethin	Chevron B37 Chevrolet	Racing Team VDS	6	6	-	3	15
3	Alan Jones	Lola T332C Chevrolet & Lola T332 Chevrolet	Theodore Racing / Bill Patterson Motors	3	2	-	9	14
4	Max Stewart	Lola T400 Chevrolet	Max Stewart	-	-	9	2	11
=	John Goss	Matich A53 Repco Holden	John Goss Racing	4	3	-	4	11
6	Alfredo Costanzo	Lola T332 Chevrolet	Auto Sprint Motors	1	1	4	-	6
=	Garrie Cooper	Elfin MR8-C Chevrolet	Ansett Team Elfin	-	-	6	-	6
8	John Leffler	Lola T400 Chevrolet	Grace Brothers Race Team	-	4	-	-	4
9	Dave Powell	Matich A51 Repco Holden	Dave Powell	-	-	3	-	3
=	John McCormack	McLaren M23 Repco Leyland	Budget Rent-A-Car System	-	-	2	1	3
11	Vern Schuppan	Elfin MR8-C Chevrolet	Ansett Team Elfin	2	-	-	-	2

There were only five classified finishers at the Sandown Park round.
