= 1978 Rothmans International Series =

Seasons
- ← 1977 1979 →

The 1978 Rothmans International Series was an Australian motor racing competition open to Australian Formula 1 cars. The series, which was the third Rothmans International Series, was won by Warwick Brown, driving a Lola T332 Chevrolet.

== Schedule ==
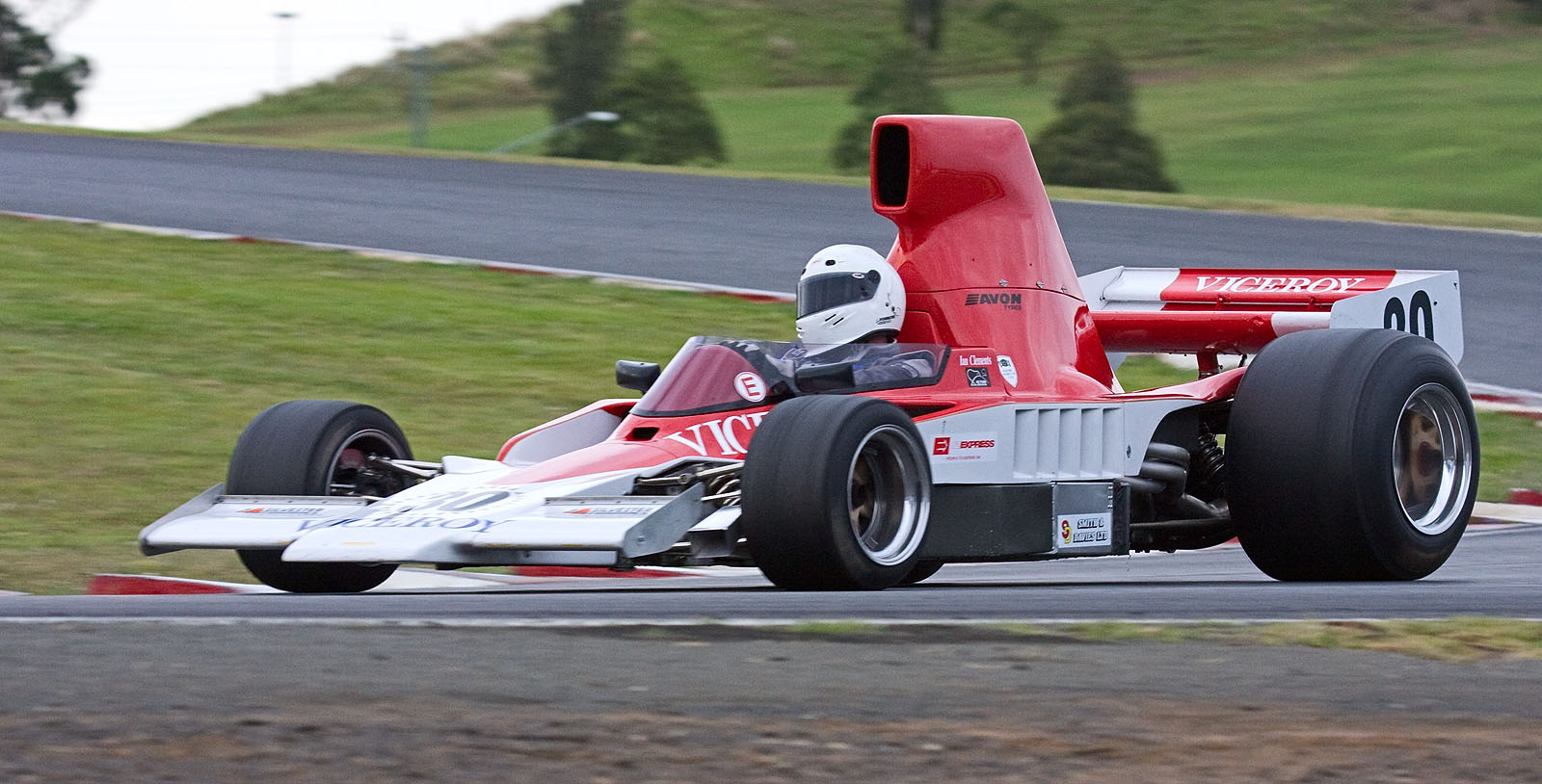
Warwick Brown won the series driving a Lola T332 similar to the example pictured above

The series was contested over four rounds with one race per round.

Round	Circuit	Date	Winning driver	Car
1	Sandown Park	5 February	Warwick Brown	Lola T332 Chevrolet
2	Adelaide International Raceway	12 February	Warwick Brown	Lola T332 Chevrolet
3	Surfers Paradise International Raceway	19 February	Warwick Brown	Lola T332 Chevrolet
4	Oran Park	26 February	Warwick Brown	Lola T332 Chevrolet

== Points system ==
Series points were awarded on a 9-6-4-3-2-1 basis for the first six places at each round.

== Series results ==
Position	Driver	Car	Entrant	San	Ade	Sur	Ora	Total
1	Warwick Brown	Lola T332 Chevrolet	Racing Team VDS	9	9	9	9	36
2	Vern Schuppan	Elfin MR8 Chevrolet	Ansett Team Elfin	-	6	6	3	15
3	Bruce Allison	Chevron B37 Chevrolet	Bill Patterson Racing	-	3	-	6	9
4	John Walker	Lola T332 Chevrolet	Magnum Wheels	-	4	3	1	8
5	Garrie Cooper	Elfin MR8 Chevrolet	Ansett Team Elfin	6	-	-	-	6
=	Graham McRae	McRae GM3 Chevrolet	Graham McRae	-	2	-	4	6
7	John Cannon	March 761 Chevrolet	Anglo-American Racing	4	-	-	-	4
=	Don Breidenbach	Lola T332 Chevrolet	Tropicana Racing Team	-	-	4	-	4
=	John Goss	Matich A53 Repco Holden	John Goss Racing Pty Ltd	1	1	-	2	4
10	Alan Hamilton	Lola T430 Chevrolet	Porsche Car Distributors	2	-	1	-	3
=	Keith Holland	Lola T332 Chevrolet	Jon Davison	3	-	-	-	3
12	John David Briggs	Lola T332 Chevrolet	Tropicana Racing Team	-	-	2	-	2
