= New Zealand F5000 =

Formula 5000 or F5000 is a historic single seater, open wheeler series that is currently run in New Zealand.

== Regulations ==
The cars are made to be kept as period correct as possible and thus are split into two classes Group A which are cars built before 1971 and Group B cars built in and after 1971. They run period correct brakes and wheels, bodywork, shock absorbers, and try to keep historical accuracy with liveries and paintwork. The Group A cars have a minimum weight of 567 kg and the Group B cars have to run with a minimum weight of 612 kg. They run with 5.0L big block engines mainly built by Chevrolet or Ford.

== Cars ==
There are currently seven different manufactures being represented; Lola, Begg, March, Talon, McLaren, McRae and Elfin.

=== Lola ===
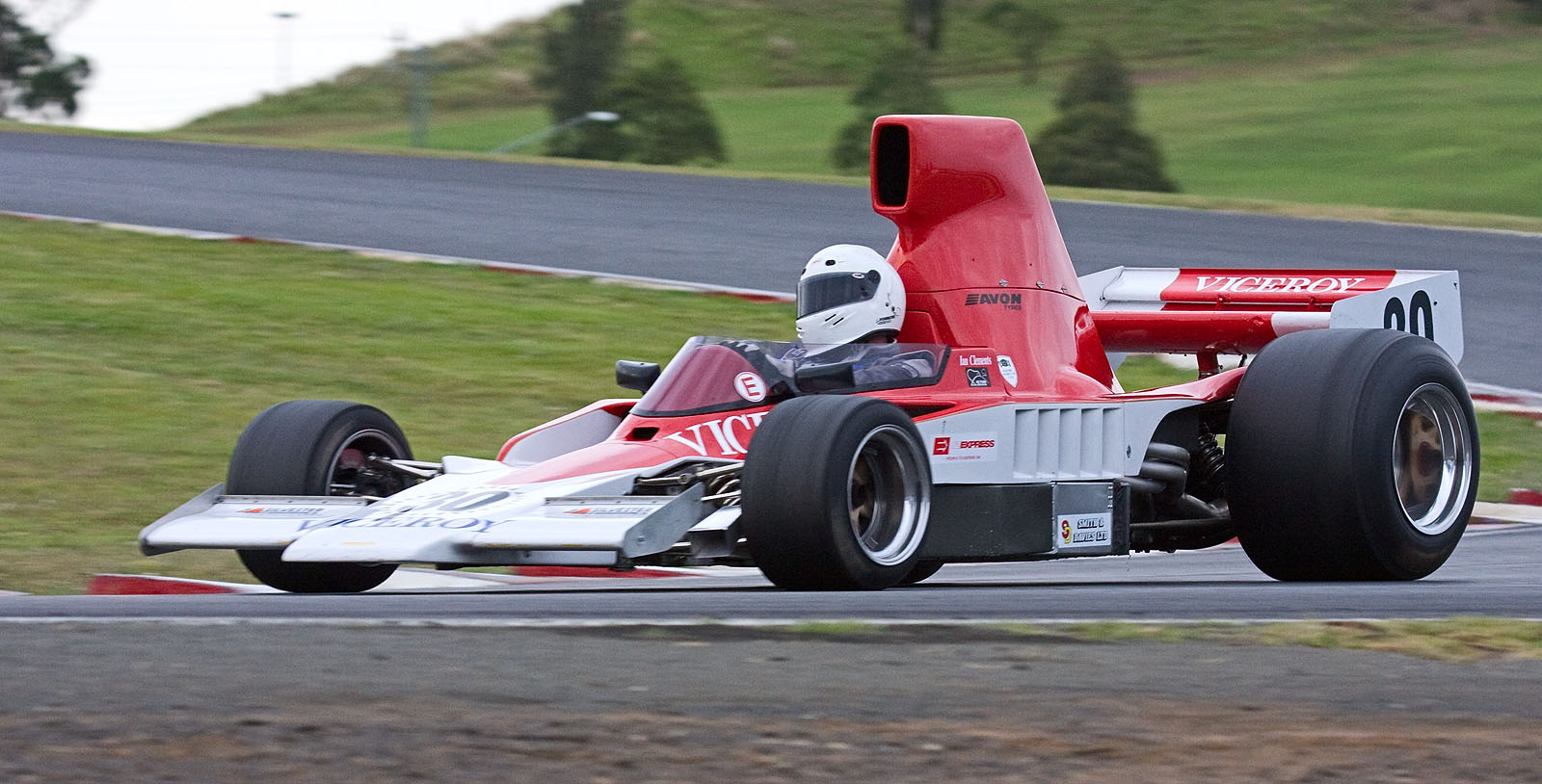
A Lola T332 being driven by Russell Greer at Eastern Creek for a Tasman revival round.

Currently the Lola T430, T142, T190, T330, T400 and T332 are used.

=== Begg ===
The Begg FM2, FM4, FM5 and 018 are currently driven.

=== March ===
Only the 73A/2 is driven.

=== Talon ===
Only the MR1 is in the series.

=== McLaren ===
The M22 and M23 are used.

=== McRae ===
The GM1 is driven.

=== Elfin ===
The MR8A is the only Elfin in the field.

== Taupo Historic Grand Prix ==
In 2016, there was a plan to hold a Race of Champions meeting between the Formula 5000 cars and Historic F1 cars at Bruce McLaren Motorsport Park. This went ahead on the 28th and 29 January 2017. The race was won by Historic F1 driver Michael Lyons, 3.8 seconds ahead of Ken Smith, who was the top F5000 driver.
