= 1975 Tasman Series =

Motorsport series in Australia and New Zealand

The 1975 Tasman Series, (officially the Tasman Championship for Drivers), was a motor racing competition open to Racing Cars complying with the Tasman Formula. Contested over eight rounds in New Zealand and Australia beginning on 5 January and ending on 23 February, it was the twelfth and final Tasman Series. The series was organised jointly by the Motorsport Association of New Zealand and the Confederation of Australian Motorsport and was promoted as the Peter Stuyvesant International Series for the 1975 Tasman Championship.

The series was won by Australian driver Warwick Brown in his fourth year of Formula 5000 racing with the Pat Burke Racing team, driving a Lola T332 Chevrolet. The series was resolved in a dramatic final race inwhat turned out to be the final Tasman Series race of all, at Sandown Raceway. Brown, fellow Australian Johnnie Walker and New Zealander Graeme Lawrence all sat on 30 points prior to the last race. All three struck trouble but with a sixth position Brown claimed the final point in Tasman Series history, breaking the deadlock to win the crown by one point. Race wins had been shared around with Brown and Lawrence each winning twice, with single victories going to Walker, Chris Amon who finished fifth in the points behind the winless but consistent John McCormack, and to Graham McRae and John Goss who each completed partial series runs focussed on their home country events.

In the aftermath of this series, the two legs of the Tasman Series broke apart. The New Zealand half became the Peter Stuyvesant Series and converted to Formula Atlantic in 1977. The Australian half became the Rothmans International Series.

== Races ==
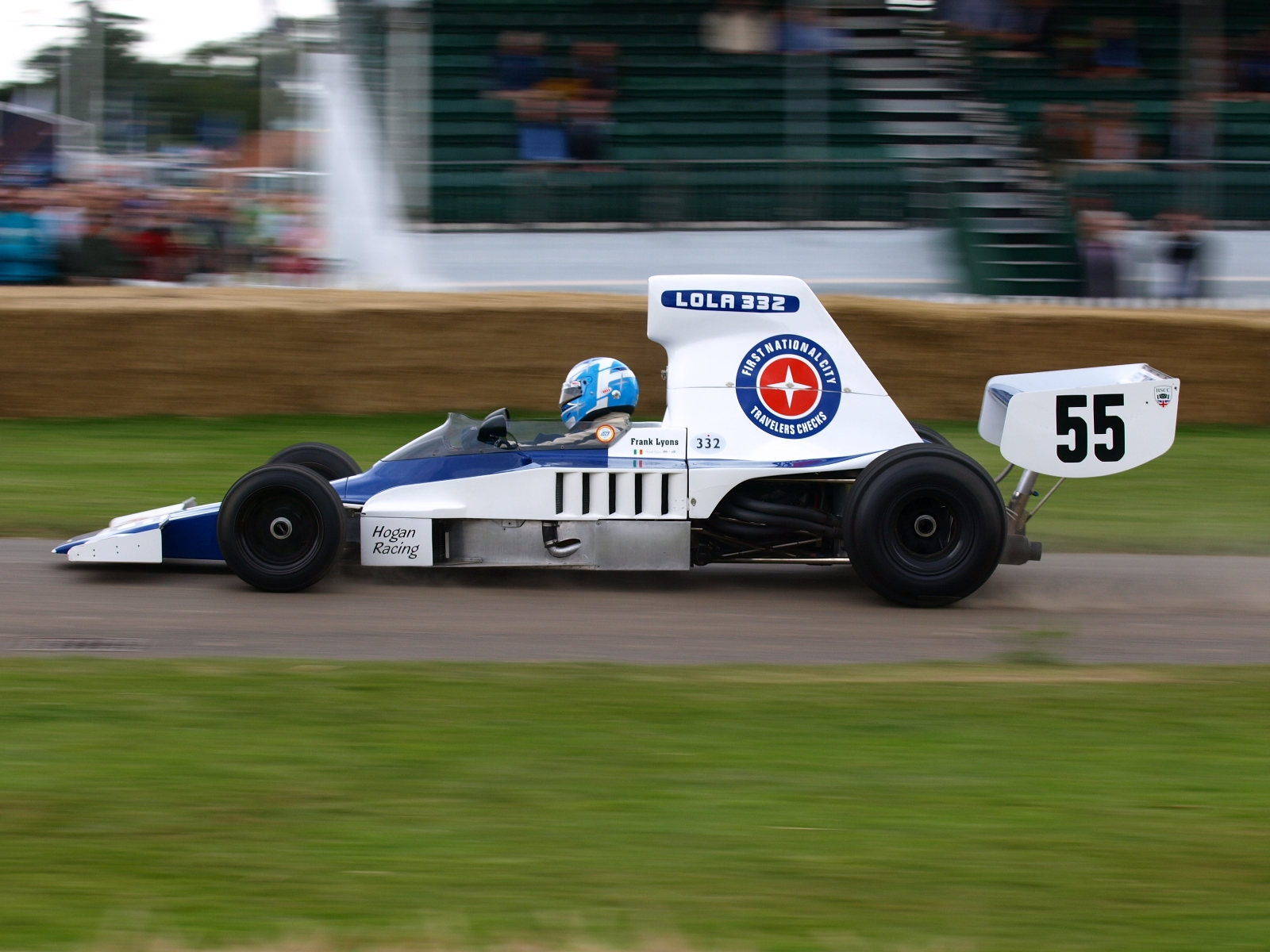
Warwick Brown won the series driving a Lola T332 similar to the example pictured above

Additional information sourced from:

| Round | | Name | Circuit | Date | Winning driver | Winning car | Winning entrant | Report |
|---|---|---|---|---|---|---|---|---|
| New Zealand | 1 | Levin International | Levin | 5 January | (New Zealand) Graeme Lawrence | Lola T332 Chevrolet | Marlboro /Singapore Airlines / Wix Filters | Report |
| New Zealand | 2 | New Zealand Grand Prix | Pukekohe | 12 January | (Australia) Warwick Brown | Lola T332 Chevrolet | Pat Burke Racing | Report |
| New Zealand | 3 | Lady Wigram Trophy | Wigram | 19 January | (New Zealand) Graham McRae | McRae GM2 Chevrolet | Commercial Bank of Australia | Report |
| New Zealand | 4 | Teretonga International | Teretonga | 26 January | (New Zealand) Chris Amon | Talon MR-1 Chevrolet | MacCormack Racing | Report |
| Australia | 5 | Oran Park 100 | Oran Park | 2 February | (Australia) Warwick Brown | Lola T332 Chevrolet | Pat Burke Racing | Report |
| Australia | 6 | Surfers Paradise 100 | Surfers Paradise | 9 February | (Australia) Johnnie Walker | Lola T332 Repco-Holden | Walker Racing | Report |
| Australia | 7 | Adelaide 100 | Adelaide | 16 February | (New Zealand) Graeme Lawrence | Lola T332 Chevrolet | Singapore Airlines | Report |
| Australia | 8 | Sandown Park Cup | Sandown | 23 February | (Australia) John Goss | Matich A53 Repco-Holden | John Goss Racing | Report |

== Points system ==
Championship points were awarded at each round on the following basis:

| Position | 1 | 2 | 3 | 4 | 5 | 6 |
|---|---|---|---|---|---|---|
| Points | 9 | 6 | 4 | 3 | 2 | 1 |

== Championship Standings ==
| Pos | Driver | Car | Entrant | LEV | PUK | WIG | TER | ORA | SUR | ADE | SAN | Pts |
|---|---|---|---|---|---|---|---|---|---|---|---|---|
| 1 | (Australia) Warwick Brown | Lola T332 Chevrolet | Part Burke Racing | 2 | 1 | Ret | Ret | 1 | 8 | 2 | 6 | 31 |
| 2 | (New Zealand) Graeme Lawrence | Lola T332 Chevrolet | Singapore Airlines | 1 | 3 | 5 | 9 | 2 | 9 | 1 | Ret | 30 |
| = | (Australia) Johnnie Walker | Lola T332 Repco Holden | Walker Racing | 4 | 4 | 3 | 4 | 3 | 1 | 3 | Ret | 30 |
| 4 | (Australia) John McCormack | Elfin MR6 Repco Holden | Ansett Team Elfin | 8 | 6 | 2 | 2 | 5 | 5 | DNS | 2 | 23 |
| 5 | (New Zealand) Chris Amon | Talon MR1 Chevrolet | McCormack Racing | Ret | 7 | Ret | 1 | 4 | Ret | 4 | 5 | 17 |
| 6 | (Australia) John Goss | Matich A53 Repco Holden | John Goss Racing | | | | | Ret | 3 | Ret | 1 | 13 |
| 7 | (New Zealand) Graham McRae | McRae GM2 Chevrolet; Matich A51 Repco Holden | Commercial Bank of Australia; Ampol (Australia) | Ret | Ret | 1 | DNS | 8 | 4 | | | 12 |
| = | (Australia) Kevin Bartlett | Lola T400 Chevrolet | Chesterfield Filter Racing | 3 | Ret | Ret | 3 | 10 | 6 | Ret | 4 | 12 |
| 9 | (New Zealand) Ken Smith | Lola T332 Chevrolet | la Vilase Travel Agents | 5 | 5 | 9 | 8 | 6 | 2 | Ret | 7 | 11 |
| = | (Australia) Max Stewart | Lola T400 Chevrolet | Max Stewart Motors | Ret | 8 | 4 | 5 | 7 | Ret | 5 | 3 | 11 |
| 11 | (New Zealand) Jim Murdoch | Begg 018 Chevrolet | Begg & Allen Ltd | 6 | 2 | 7 | Ret | DNS | | 7 | Ret | 7 |
| 12 | (New Zealand) David Oxton | Lola T330 Chevrolet | Coca-Cola Bottlers (N.Z.) Ltd | | | 6 | Ret | | | | | 1 |
| = | (New Zealand) Baron Robertson | Elfin MR5 Repco Holden | Robertson Racing | 9 | 11 | DNS | 6 | | | | | 1 |
| = | (Australia) Garrie Cooper | Elfin MR5 Repco Holden | Ansett Team Elfin | | | | | Ret | 7 | 6 | 8 | 1 |
| Pos | Driver | Car | Entrant | LEV | PUK | WIG | TER | ORA | SUR | SAN | ADE | Pts |

| Colour | Result |
|---|---|
| Gold | Winner |
| Silver | Second place |
| Bronze | Third place |
| Green | Points classification |
| Blue | Non-points classification |
| Blue | Non-classified finish (NC) |
| Purple | Retired, not classified (Ret) |
| Red | Did not qualify (DNQ) |
| Red | Did not pre-qualify (DNPQ) |
| Black | Disqualified (DSQ) |
| White | Did not start (DNS) |
| White | Withdrew (WD) |
| White | Race cancelled (C) |
| Blank | Did not practice (DNP) |
| Blank | Did not arrive (DNA) |
| Blank | Excluded (EX) |

=== Key ===
| Abbreviation | Circuit |
|---|---|
| ADE | Adelaide |
| LEV | Levin |
| ORA | Oran Park |
| PUK | Pukekohe |
| SAN | Sandown |
| SUR | Surfers Paradise |
| TER | Teretonga |
| WIG | Wigram |
