= Chris Amon =

New Zealand racing driver (1943–2016)

Chris Amon MBE
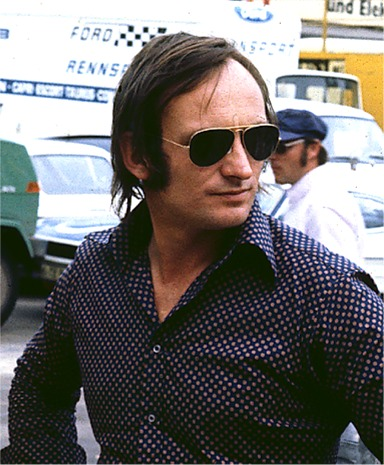
- Amon in 1973
- Born: Christopher Arthur Amon; 20 July 1943; Bulls, Rangitikei, New Zealand
- Died: 3 August 2016 (aged 73); Rotorua, Bay of Plenty, New Zealand
- Spouse: Tish Wotherspoon (m. 1977)
- Children: 3

Formula One World Championship career
- Nationality: (New Zealand) New Zealander
- Active years: 1963–1976
- Team(s): Parnell, privateer Brabham, McLaren, Cooper, Amon, Ferrari, March, Matra, Tecno, Tyrrell, BRM, Ensign, Wolf–Williams
- Entries: 108 (96 starts)
- Championships: 0
- Wins: 0
- Podiums: 11
- Career points: 83
- Pole positions: 5
- Fastest laps: 3
- First entry: 1963 Monaco Grand Prix
- Last entry: 1976 Canadian Grand Prix

24 Hours of Le Mans career
- Years: 1964–1967, 1969, 1971–1973
- Teams: Cunningham, Shelby, Ferrari, Matra, BMW
- Best finish: 1st (1966)
- Class wins: 1 (1966)

Christopher Arthur Amon (/ˈeɪmən/; 20 July 1943 – 3 August 2016) was a New Zealand racing driver and motorsport executive who competed in Formula One from 1963 to 1976. Widely regarded as one of the greatest drivers to never win a Formula One Grand Prix, (Note: Per several sources:) Amon won the 24 Hours of Le Mans in 1966 with Ford, as well as the 24 Hours of Daytona in 1967 with Ferrari.

Born and raised in Bulls, Amon learned to drive aged six and initially competed in hillclimbing before progressing to national motor racing competition in 1962. Amon joined Reg Parnell Racing the following year, making his Formula One debut at the Monaco Grand Prix. After a non-classified championship finish in his rookie season, Amon scored his maiden points finish with fifth-place at the 1964 Dutch Grand Prix. Following intermittent Grand Prix appearances in 1965, Amon became a test driver for McLaren and moved into sportscar racing. After winning the 1966 24 Hours of Le Mans in the Ford GT40 Mk.II alongside Bruce McLaren, Amon was signed by Ferrari for 1967, achieving his maiden podium at the Monaco Grand Prix amongst winning the 24 Hours of Daytona; he finished a career-best fifth in the World Drivers' Championship.

After struggling with reliability at Ferrari in 1968 and 1969, Amon departed the team in search of Cosworth DFV-powered machinery. He scored several further podiums with March in 1970 before a two-year stint with Matra. Amon then made sporadic appearances for Tecno and Tyrrell in his 1973 campaign. Amon had founded Chris Amon Racing in 1966—when he entered the Italian Grand Prix in a privateer Brabham BT11—and competed with them at four Grands Prix in 1974, driving the AF101. Amon made further appearances for BRM, Ensign, and Wolf–Williams before retiring at the end of the 1976 season.

Amon was renowned for his poor luck in Formula One, losing out on several World Championship Grand Prix victories due to mechanical faults. Across 14 seasons, he achieved five pole positions, three fastest laps, and 11 podiums, with two non-championship wins at the 1970 BRDC International Trophy and the 1971 Argentine Grand Prix. Outside of Formula One, Amon won the Tasman Series in 1969 with Scuderia Veloce. Amon was appointed a Member of the Order of the British Empire in the 1993 Queen's Birthday Honours, and inducted into the New Zealand Sports Hall of Fame in 1995.

== Early life ==
Amon was born in Bulls, New Zealand, and attended Whanganui Collegiate School. He was the only child of wealthy sheep-owners Ngaio and Betty Amon. He learned to drive at the age of six, taught by a farm worker on the family farm. On leaving school, he persuaded his father to buy him an Austin A40 Special, which he entered in some minor local races and hillclimbs along with practice on the family farm. He progressed to a 1.5-litre Cooper and then an old 2.5-litre Maserati 250F, but only began to draw attention when he drove the Cooper-Climax T51 which Bruce McLaren had used to win his maiden Grand Prix.

In 1962, Amon entered the Cooper for the New Zealand winter series, but was hampered by mechanical problems. However, Scuderia Veloce entered him in a similar car, and, in the rain at Lakeside, he performed well. One of the spectators there was the English racing driver Reg Parnell, who persuaded Amon to come to England and race for his team. In a test at Goodwood Amon continued to impress and was on the pace in the Goodwood International Trophy and Aintree 200 pre-season races.

== Racing career ==
=== 1960s ===
==== 1963 ====
For the 1963 Formula One season, the Parnell team were using the year old Lola Mk4A, powered by 1962 specification Climax V8 engines. Amon was teamed with the very experienced Maurice Trintignant for the first race of the season at Monaco and his Grand Prix career started with what was to become typical bad luck: Trintignant's Climax developed a misfire, so he took over Amon's car.

At the 1963 Belgian Grand Prix, Amon was partnered by Lucien Bianchi and started ahead of him from 15th position. After nine laps, however, an oil fire ended his race. He continued to experience mechanical problems at the Dutch, Mexican and German Grands Prix; and after an accident in practice for the Italian Grand Prix left him hanging out of his car's cockpit with three broken ribs, he missed both the Italian and United States rounds.

Amon usually qualified in the midfield and generally outpaced his teammates, who included his good friend Mike Hailwood. His best results of the year were seventh at the French and British Grands Prix. During this time, however, Amon's social life was attracting as much attention as his driving. He was a member of the Ditton Road Flyers, the social set named after the road in London where Amon shared an apartment with his Formula One colleagues Peter Revson, Hailwood and Tony Maggs.

Parnell was nonetheless impressed with Amon's results in what was regarded as less-than-competitive machinery and promoted him to team leader. Parnell died from peritonitis in January 1964 and his son Tim took over the team.

==== 1964 ====
In a series of four pre-season races in Britain and Italy, Amon recorded three fifth places at Snetterton, Silverstone and Syracuse. He failed to qualify for the first F1 race of the season, the Monaco GP, but at the next race, the Dutch GP, he scored his first World Championship points. The rest of his season, however, was blighted by mechanical problems.

==== 1965 ====
Parnell was offered BRM engines for 1965, but only if it ran Richard Attwood as its regular driver. Reluctantly, Parnell agreed and Attwood took Amon's place. Spotting an opportunity, Bruce McLaren quickly signed Amon for his new McLaren team, but when no second McLaren F1 car materialised, Amon could only drive in sports car races.

At the French GP, Amon rejoined Parnell to stand in for an injured Attwood. Amon also competed in a Formula Two race in Stuttgart and won. He returned to Germany for the German GP as second Parnell driver, but mechanical failure again forced an early retirement. His last drive before Attwood's return, a non-championship race in Enna, Sicily, also ended in retirement.

==== 1966 ====
During 1966, Amon continued to race for McLaren in Can-Am. He was intended to drive the second McLaren M2B but difficulties with engine supply meant that the team never made the intended expansion to two cars. (James Garner's character Pete Aron's helmet and car livery in the film Grand Prix were modelled on Amon driving a McLaren, which caused the movie makers to have to encourage other cars to be painted in the 'Yamura' colours and other drivers (Bruce McLaren included) to wear Amon-style helmets.)

However, an opportunity arose to drive for the Cooper F1 team after Richie Ginther left them for Honda. Amon drove for Cooper at the French GP and was scheduled to drive for them for the rest of the season, until the more successful John Surtees left Scuderia Ferrari to join Cooper and Amon found himself dropped.

Amon made one other F1 appearance during the year, driving a Brabham BT11 powered by an old 2-litre BRM engine at the Italian GP under the banner of "Chris Amon Racing". He failed to qualify.

Amon did however, score his biggest success to date when he partnered Bruce McLaren in a 7-litre Ford GT40 Mark II and Ken Miles to Ford's dead-heat "photo-finish" after Miles was instructed to slow down despite leading at the Le Mans 24-hour race, spearheading a formation finish. He subsequently received an invitation to meet Enzo Ferrari at the Ferrari home in Maranello, where he signed to race for Ferrari in 1967 alongside Lorenzo Bandini, Mike Parkes and Ludovico Scarfiotti.

==== 1967 ====
Amon's first year with Ferrari did not begin auspiciously. En route to Brands Hatch for the pre-season Formula One Race of Champions, he crashed his road car and, following race practice, had to withdraw. Tragedy then struck the Ferrari team when Bandini died following a crash during the 1967 Monaco Grand Prix, Mike Parkes broke both his legs at the Belgian Grand Prix and, in the aftermath, Ludovico Scarfiotti went into temporary retirement. Amon, therefore, became Ferrari's only driver for the rest of the season, until joined by Jonathan Williams for the final race in Mexico. Amon scored his first podium in his first official outing for the Scuderia in Monaco, and at the end of 1967, he had achieved four third places finishing fifth in the Drivers' Championship, in what was going to be the most successful season of his career.

Amon's Ferrari contract also included sports car racing and he began 1967 by winning the Daytona 24 Hours and 1000km Monza events with Bandini in the 4-litre Ferrari 330-P4. He finished the year partnering Jackie Stewart to a second place at the BOAC 500, thereby clinching the manufacturer's world championship for Ferrari by one point over Porsche.

==== 1968 ====
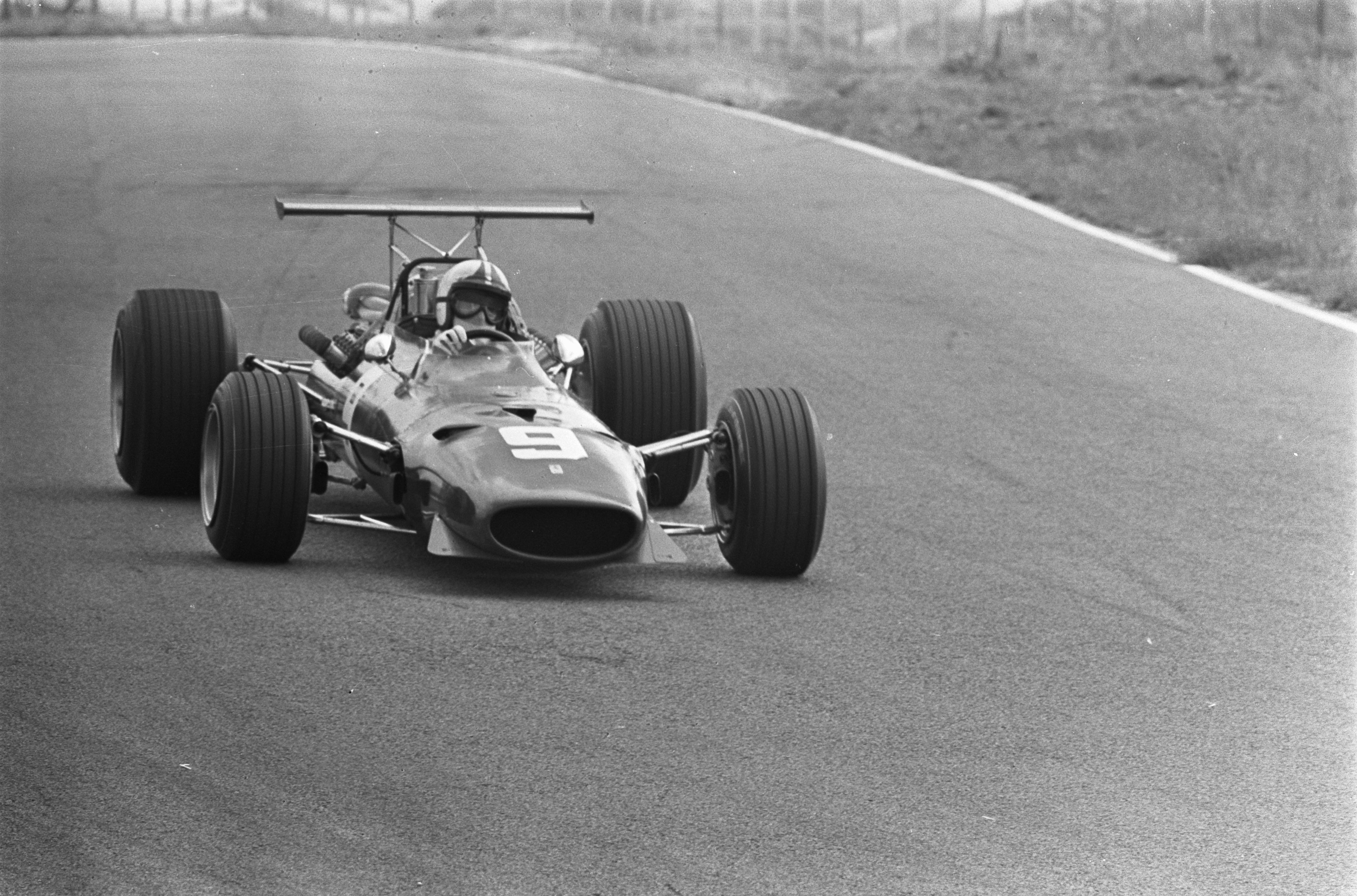
Amon driving for Ferrari in the 1968 Dutch Grand Prix

1968 was the year aerodynamics first played a significant role in F1 car design and Amon worked with engineer Mauro Forghieri to place aerofoils on the Ferrari 312.

In January 1968, Amon had returned home to New Zealand and Australia to compete in the 1968 Tasman Series which was used by many of the top Formula One drivers as a warm up series to the World Championship. For the 1968 series Ferrari decided to use the 2.4 engines with a new Dino 166 F2 chassis rather than a downsized 3-litre V12. Using the 246T Amon won the first two rounds of the Tasman Series, including the 1968 New Zealand Grand Prix, before narrowly losing the series to the Lotus-Ford of Jim Clark. The Dino 246 Tasmania was better handling than Clark's Lotus 49T which was still wingless and a difficult proposition. Impressed by Amon's driving in the NZ rounds, Ferrari dispatched a new four-valve version of the 2.4 V6 for the Australian rounds and this gave another 15 hp, but with lesser reliability which, combined with the fact Clark was the best driver in the world at the time, cost Amon the series, although in the final round at Sandown Park he duelled wheel to wheel with Clark before being pipped at the line.

After the first race of the F1 season in South Africa, Amon achieved pole positions in three of the following four races (at the Spanish, Belgian and Dutch Grands Prix) but ever-present mechanical problems meant he secured only a single Championship point from them. Throughout the rest of the season, he never qualified lower than fifth place and nearly scored victories at the British and Canadian rounds and he suffered a 100 mph crash in Italy which demolished his car. In Britain, he duelled to the line with Jo Siffert's Lotus 49B and in Canada he dominated the race despite a malfunctioning clutch. Seventeen laps from the finish, however, his car's transmission failed and a distraught Amon had to be consoled by Jacky Ickx. From at least ten promising starts that season, he was only able to finish five races and score ten Championship points. His best finish was second place to Siffert's Lotus-Cosworth at the British Grand Prix.

Outside F1, Amon was runner-up in the Formula Two race at Zolder, Belgium, testing the Dino 166 F2. He also came third in that year's BRDC International Trophy.

==== 1969 ====
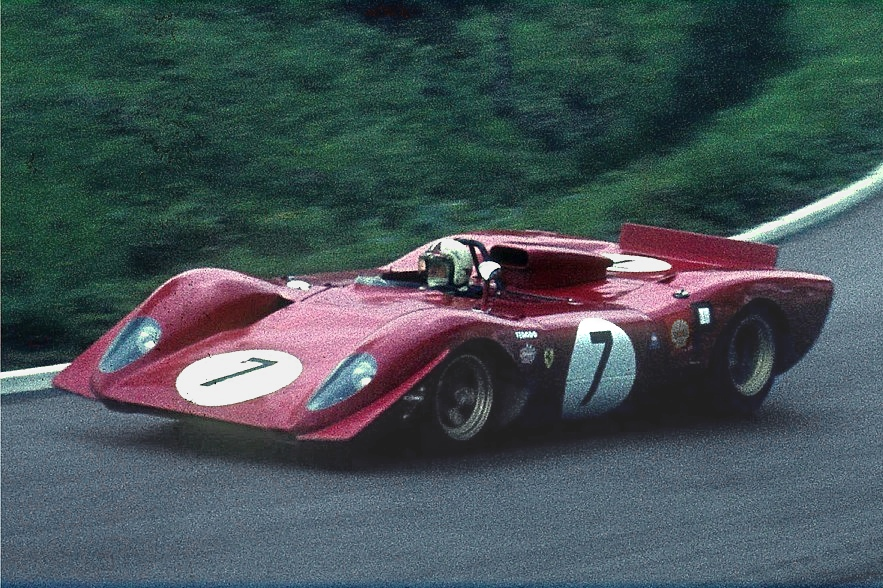
Amon in the 3.0L Ferrari 312P during the 1969 Nürburgring 1000 km.

Amon began 1969 with success driving the Dino engined 246 Tasmania in the Tasman Series that included winning both the New Zealand and Australian Grands Prix. In straight fights, he beat new Gold Leaf Lotus team leader, Jochen Rindt, into second in the races at Pukekohe and Sandown. He would ultimately win the seven race Tasman Series, probably the best of the seven-year 2.5-litre international formula series in this country and the nearest to World Championship level racing in New Zealand, with ferocious competition between Rindt, Graham Hill, Amon and Williams driver Piers Courage. It was actually much more serious racing than the McLaren dominated Can-Am series in the US in which the big sports cars required few gear changes and were essentially cruised to victory with little real competition, where the Tasman cars were essentially marginally lower power F1 cars, as difficult to drive as GP cars on unforgiving very dangerous narrow tracks. Amon finished with four wins, two-thirds and one retirement, but in Formula One his poor luck continued. Despite six starts from top-six positions, he was only able to achieve a third-place at the Dutch GP. The ageing 312 was still quick at the start of the season and after the Lotus 49Bs of Rindt and Graham Hill crashed spectacularly after high wing failure in the opening laps at Barcelona, Amon dominated the Spanish GP until the almost inevitable engine breakage on lap 56, 40 seconds ahead of Stewart's Matra. At Monaco Amon ran second to Stewart for the first 17 laps losing a second a lap to Stewart, but still gaining a second a lap on the third placed G. Hill who survived the race of attrition to win. Ferrari's F1 V12 engine was too unreliable and although its replacement had proven very fast in testing, it had suffered many mechanical breakages. Amon had no reason to believe it would be any more dependable than the V12, so although the new engine was clearly more powerful, he decided to leave Ferrari for a Cosworth DFV powered team. He was more influenced by views of Jackie Stewart and Jochen Rindt, who believed it was essential to be Ford DFV-powered to be competitive.

In addition to Formula One, Amon also drove for Ferrari in the 1969 International Championship for Makes, partnering Pedro Rodriguez to a fourth place in the BOAC 500 at Brands Hatch and coming second at the 12 Hours of Sebring, but retiring from the 1000km Nürburgring and 1000km Monza races, all in the Ferrari 312P sportscar. He also drove in a few Can-Am races. His last race for Ferrari would be the 1970 1000 km Monza, where he finished as runner-up.

=== 1970s ===
==== 1970 ====
For the 1970 Formula One season, Amon made what was to be the first of several moves to smaller, newer teams. March Engineering had been formed the previous year to build custom chassis for Formulas 2 and 3, but quickly moved into F1, designing and building the March 701. Amon and Siffert were signed as drivers, with IndyCar driver Mario Andretti making an occasional appearance in a third car. March also sold their 701 chassis to Tyrrell, where Jackie Stewart drove it to its first victory in that year's Spanish GP.

Amon won the pre-season Silverstone International Trophy, but once the F1 season began he found himself prevented from converting good qualifying positions into good results. He qualified second behind Stewart's Tyrrell-March for the season-opening South African Grand Prix only for his own March to overheat within fourteen laps. Amon then qualified sixth for the Spanish Grand Prix only for his March's Ford-Cosworth DFV engine to expire within ten laps. He qualified and ran second in the 1970 Monaco Grand Prix until his suspension failed twenty laps from the finish. This was the race where Amon refused to drive unless his entry number was changed from 18 – the number under which his then teammate Lorenzo Bandini had crashed and died in Monaco – to 28.

Amon's close second place from a third-place start at the 1970 Belgian Grand Prix finally gave the March works team their first points finish. At that race, Amon set fastest lap at over 152 miles per hour, a lap record which still stands as of 2016, as it was the last race on the full-length Spa-Francorchamps circuit. However, after qualifying fourth for the next race, the Dutch Grand Prix, his car's clutch broke after just one lap. Amon duplicated his Belgian result at the 1970 French Grand Prix. After a disappointing performance in the British GP at Brands Hatch where Amon finished fifth after being outqualified by tyro Ronnie Peterson in a private 701 on the same tyres, conflict with team boss Max Mosley over the non-delivery of three-quarters of Amon's expected pay for the season saw him provided with inferior DFVs and two backmarker seventh places in Austria and Italy, Amon finished the season strongly with strong drives to third at Mosport, fifth at Watkins Glen and fourth in Mexico. At Watkins Glen in the USGP, he was robbed of a probably certain victory, in the opinion of March designer Robin Herd, by a puncture.

By the end of the year, disagreements with March co-founders Mosley and Robin Herd meant that Amon had decided to move to another relatively new team, Matra.

==== 1971 ====
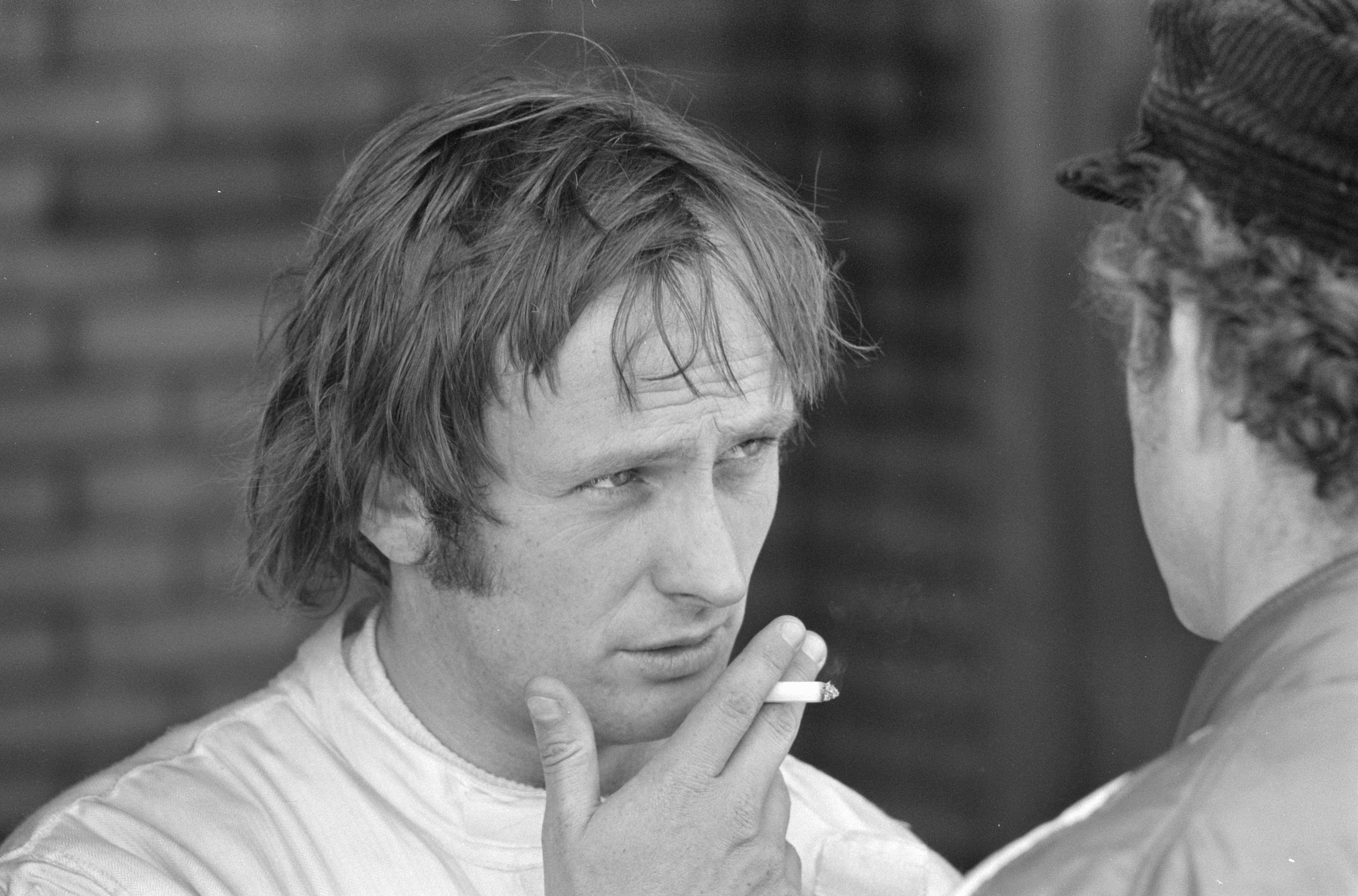
Amon at the 1970 Dutch Grand Prix

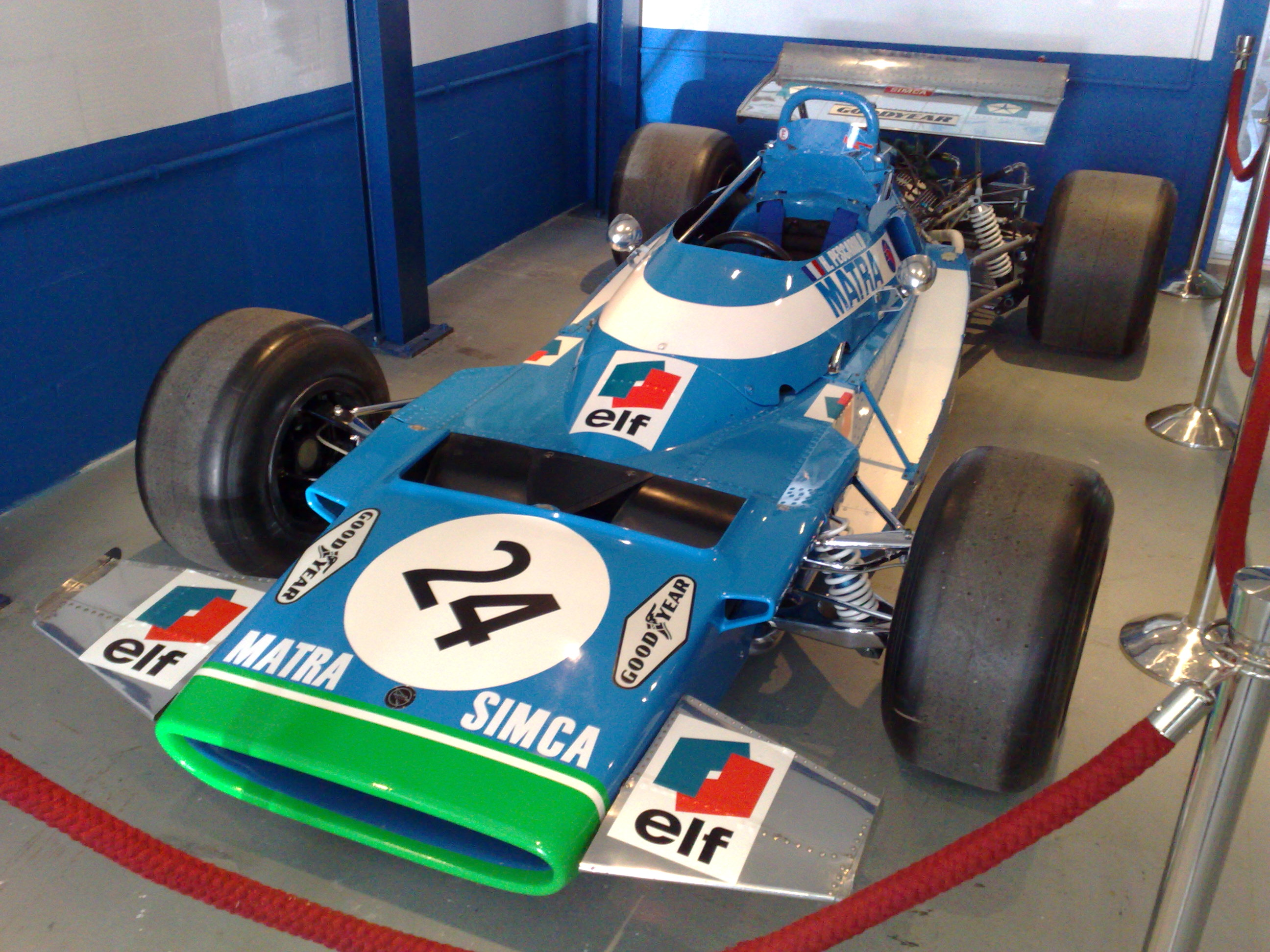
Chris Amon's Matra MS120 racing car, used in the 1971 Argentine Grand Prix

In 1971, Amon, now driving for the Matra factory team, once again scored a pre-season victory, this time at the Argentine Grand Prix. Once the Formula One season had begun, he managed to convert a third-place start at the Spanish GP into a third-place podium finish and scored a couple of fifth places in the South African and French GPs. Apart from these results, however, his run of poor F1 returns continued. He had a major accident at the Nürburgring and it sidelined him for the next race at the Österreichring. At the Italian GP, he qualified in pole position and despite a poor start to the race looked as if he would capitalise on it – until the visor on his helmet became detached. Amon had to slow to avoid risking a major accident, thereby allowing other drivers to catch and overtake him. He finished the race in sixth place, scoring just one Championship point.

During the year, Amon also competed in the non-championship Questor Grand Prix at the new Ontario Motor Speedway, where he qualified second and, despite suffering a puncture during the race, managed to finish fourth.

In the Tasman Series, Amon started from fourth at the Levin Circuit and in the race, he battled with David Oxton and John Cannon but managed to finish third. Amon's third race at Wigram Airfield starting fifth and spun at the start to drop him to the back of the field but managed to climb up to fifth.

==== 1972 ====
In the 1972 Formula One season, Amon, again driving for Matra achieved a handful of points-scoring finishes, but only one podium appearance, at the French GP. Here he achieved the fifth and final pole position of his career and was leading the race until a puncture forced him to pit. However, he climbed back through the field, breaking the circuit's lap record to finish third.

With the money he had made from motorsport, Amon decided to set up a racing engine firm with former BRM engineer Aubrey Woods. Amon Racing Engines supplied Formula 2 engines to a few drivers, but the company quickly became too expensive to run and was sold to March for a loss.

Matra decided to end their participation in Formula One at the end of 1972, so Amon found himself looking to return to March as a driver. The place, however, was given to Jean-Pierre Jarier, purportedly for financial reasons. Amon therefore signed for another recently formed F1 team, Tecno.

==== 1973 ====
Tecno had entered Formula One the previous year, with their own flat-twelve engine. Their first year had been dismal, so they jumped at the chance to sign Amon for the new season. The testing of a new chassis, the PA123-006, designed by former Lotus and McLaren mechanic Allan McCall, proved to be time-consuming. After its non-appearance for the Spanish GP, Amon and Tecno team manager David Yorke met with Enzo Ferrari to see if Amon could be released from his contract to develop the new Ferrari B3 for Ickx and Mezarrio, in a supposedly one off GP drive at Monaco. Yorke rejected the release, and Amon admitted he would not have left Ferrari if offered the drive for a season.

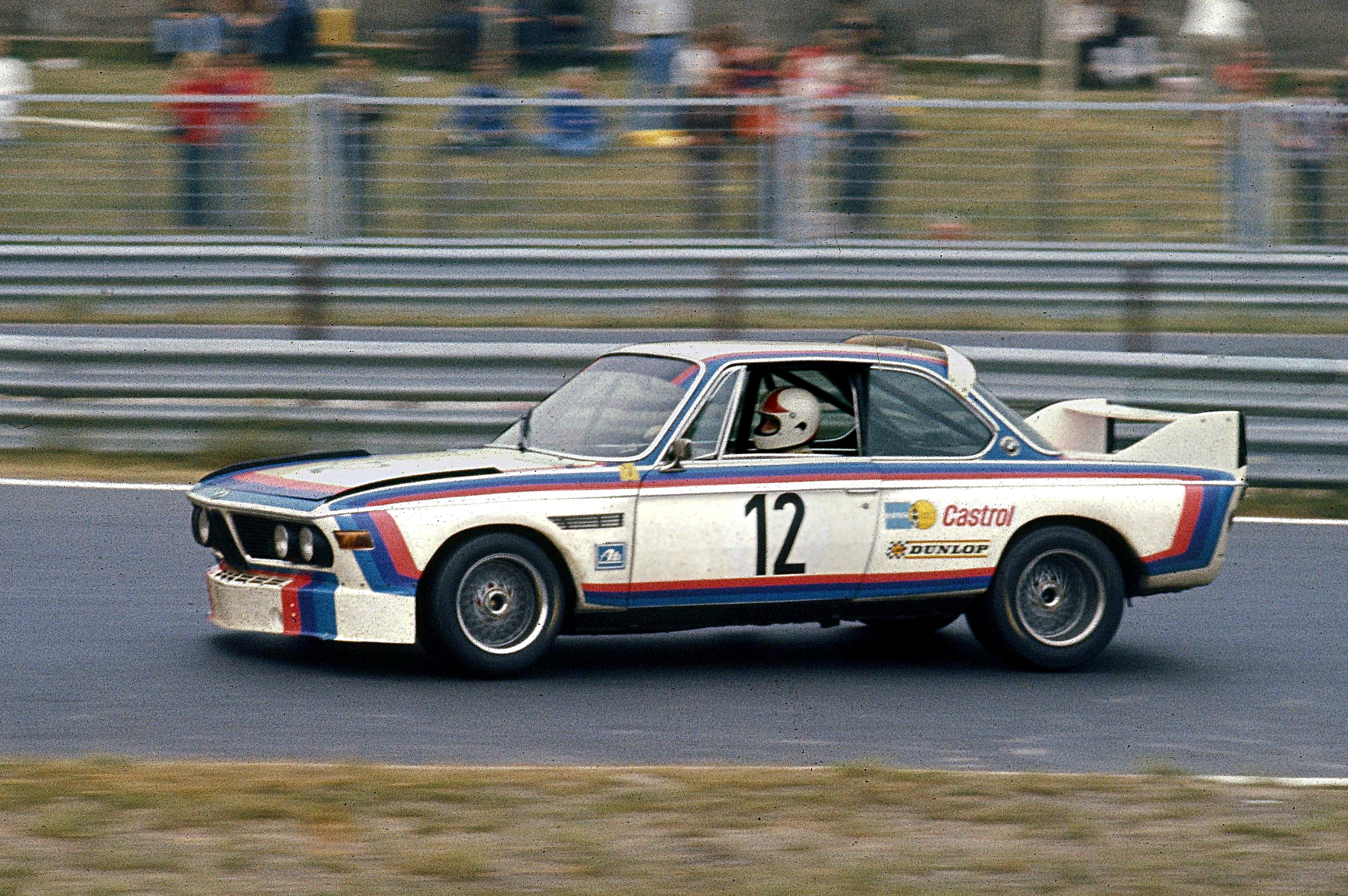
Chris Amon won the 1973 Nürburgring 6-hour race, sharing a works BMW 3.0 CSL with Hans-Joachim Stuck

Tecno were not able to field the PA123-006 until the fifth race of the season, the Belgian Grand Prix. Amon qualified 15th and finished sixth, three laps behind race winner Jackie Stewart, but scoring what would turn out to be the team's only point in F1. At the next race, in Monaco, Amon qualified 12th and ran seventh before retiring with an overheating engine. The chassis felt good but Amon was unhappy with the car. He decided to concentrate on a still in-development Tecno chassis built by unproven designer Gordon Fowell. This was against the view of the Tecno team and sponsors Martini Rossi who required the car and driver to appear at races While Amon commented at the time that it was "the best chassis I've ever sat in", it too proved virtually undriveable. Amon refused to drive the McCall designed Tecno in the Swedish or German Gps and withdrew from the Austrian GP after qualifying. By the time of the Austrian GP, four races from the end of the season, Amon's patience had run out and he left the team. He would later claim that the months he spent with the team "felt like ten [seasons]".

Tyrrell offered Amon a third car – the 005 – in which to drive the last two races of the season. In Canada, he finished tenth, three laps behind Peter Revson's victorious McLaren. Amon then withdrew, along with Stewart, from the final race of the year, in the United States, following the death of their teammate François Cevert during qualifying.

==== 1974 ====
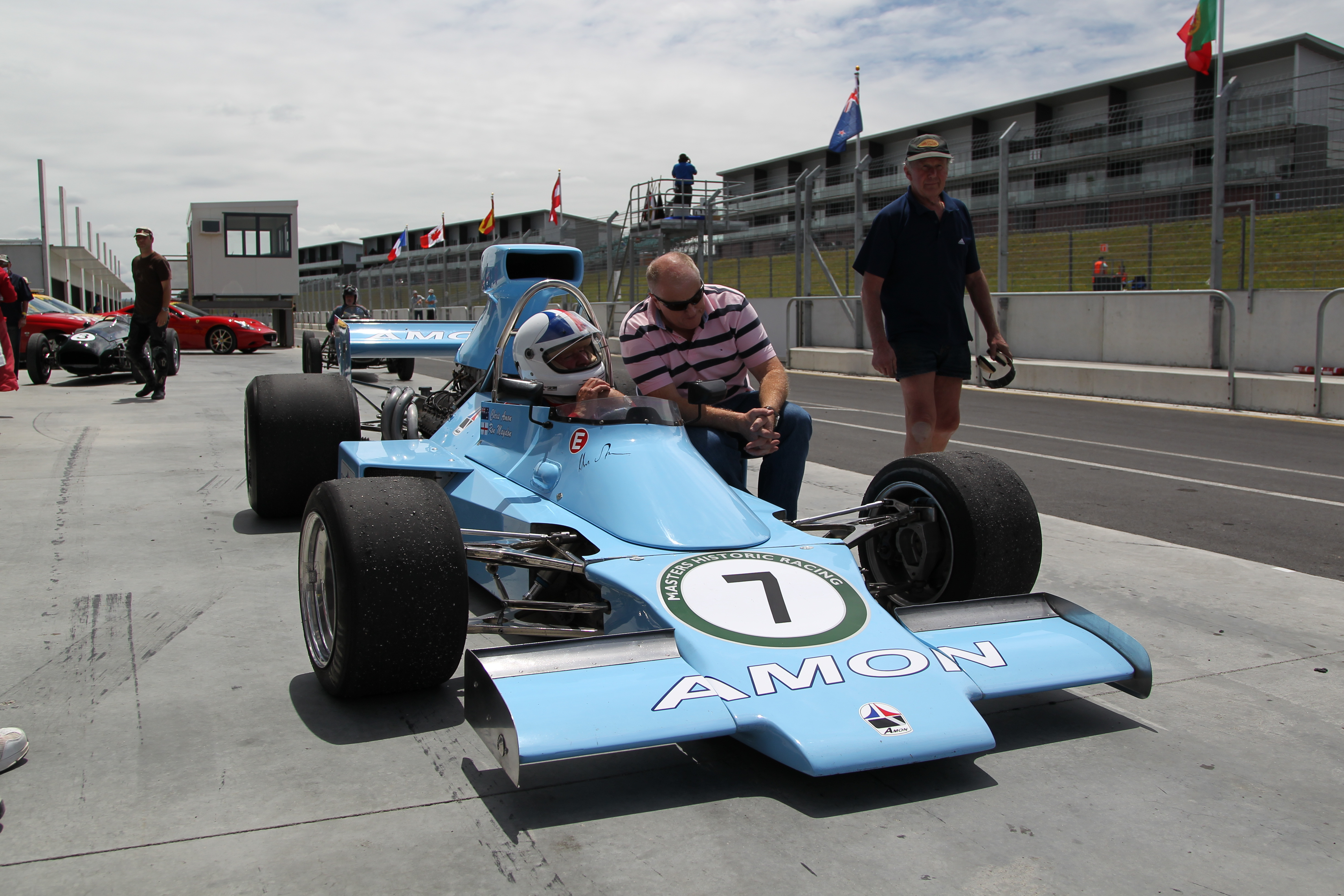
Chris Amon seated in the Amon AF101 at the NZ Festival of Motor Racing 2011

For the 1974 F1 season, Amon revived Chris Amon Racing. Gordon Fowell designed the car, the AF101, which featured a single central fuel tank, titanium torsion bars and a forward driving position. Structurally, however, it proved to be weak and was not ready for an F1 appearance until the fourth race of the season, the Spanish GP. Amon was only able to qualify 23rd, thanks to brake-disc vibration that only became worse with the tyres for the wet race that followed. Despite cautious driving, a brake shaft finally broke and Amon was forced to retire after 22 laps.

Following further work and testing, Amon returned for the Monaco GP and qualified twentieth, but, thanks to mechanical problems, he was unable to start the race. Further problems and illness meant Amon was not able to reappear with the F101 until the Italian GP, three races from the end of the season, but this time he was unable to qualify. That sealed the fate of both the car and Chris Amon Racing, leaving Amon to drive the season's last two races with the faltering BRM team. He would later reveal that he had turned down a chance to join the Brabham team earlier in the season.

==== 1975 ====
Amon contested the 1975 F5000 Tasman series against only Australasian drivers. He qualified on the front row of three of the four New Zealand rounds and scored a victory at Teretonga in January 1975 in rainy conditions by 24.2 seconds. In the Australian rounds, the competition was always harder with more good cars and the locals on their own tracks. Amon had a frustrating series of races unable to pass, South Australian Johnnie Walker, in a superior Lola T332 chassis with Repco-engineered V8. At Surfers Paradise, running from the back of the grid he managed to eventually pass Walker by widening the braking zone in the only corner where overtaking was usually possible. Amon brushed the edge of the track on repeated laps, got extra grip and passed Walker to take the lead. He had been forced to miss most of the practice session, when Customs seized his car's gearbox. In the race, the brilliant effort went for nothing as the Chev engine blew. At Oran Park and Adelaide, he followed Walker the whole way to fourth and third, unable to pass. In the final deciding race for the Tasman Series with Brown, Walker and Lawrence still in contention, Walker lost his T332 on the first lap and it demolished on wooden barriers surrounding Sandown's car and horse racing tracks. Amon was never in contention and finished fourth. Amon intended to compete in F5000 in both Europe and the US in 1975 but started in only one round of both series, managing a pole in one Shellsport round in the UK and a 4th place overall at the Long Beach GP in a two heat race. He used different Talon F5000 cars for both races. Apart from these successes, Amon's racing career seemed once again to have stalled. Yet the speed he showed in qualifying for a couple of UK F5000 races encouraged Mo Nunn of the small Ensign team to give him a race driving the Ensign N175. Amon managed seventh in the non-championship Swiss GP at Dijon, which led to two more drives for the team, finishing 12th in both the Austrian and Italian GPs. At Monza after a long pit stop he finally ran at competitive pace, running four laps down but keeping pace with the leading Ferrari 312T of Niki Lauda for a number of laps. Progressive evaluation of the possibilities of what was slowing the N175 led Amon to change the airbox alignment on the day of the Italian GP and this resulted in a two-second gain (much like the change in air cooler position that lost and gained two seconds on Hunt's McLaren M23 resolved by the 1976 French GP). Ironically Amon never raced the N175 again and the high airboxes had been banned by the time N176 ran at Jarama the following year, but the flash of testing and driving genius was enough to give Amon another chance. Although the results were unremarkable, he and Nunn worked well together, so Amon joined Ensign for the 1976 F1 season.

==== 1976 ====
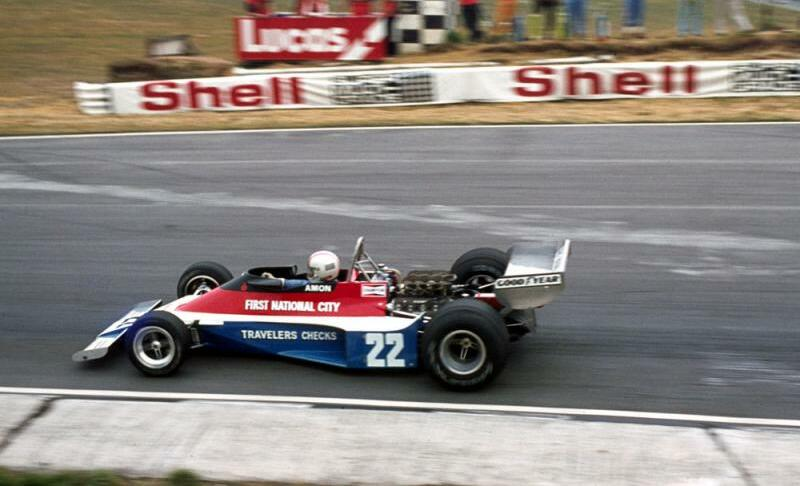
Amon driving for Ensign at the 1976 British Grand Prix.

Ensign's first race of the season was the South African GP where Amon qualified 18th and showed a revival of form, climbing to seventh place, in the old Ensign N174 and contesting sixth with Mario Andretti in the Parnelli Ford, in the last laps before a last minute refueling stop left him 14th. Thereafter results began to improve, with Amon qualifying 17th and finishing eighth in the USA West GP; qualifying tenth and finishing fifth in the Spanish GP; and then qualifying eighth for the Belgian GP. More points then seemed likely from the race until his car lost a wheel 19 laps from the finish and Amon was lucky to escape unhurt from the ensuing accident. He then achieved a third-place grid position start for the Swedish GP using a Nicholson rebuilt Cosworth for the first time and in the race looked as if he would join Tyrrell drivers Jody Scheckter and Patrick Depailler on the podium, until suspension failure threw him from the track after 38 laps.

Amon had again been lucky to escape serious injury and decided to miss the next race, the French GP. He returned for the British GP, qualifying in sixth and running fourth in the race when his Ford-Cosworth DFV engine developed a water leak. Rather than risk losing an engine, his team called him in to retire.

At the German GP problems dogged his attempts to qualify well, but it was Niki Lauda's crash during the second lap of the race that had a far greater impact. Amon refused to restart the race and Nunn fired him from the team. Amon declared his retirement from the sport and returned to New Zealand.

"I'd seen too many people fried in racing cars at that stage. When you've driven past Bandini, Schlesser, Courage and Williamson, another shunt like that was simply too much. It was a personal decision..."
(Amon, on his retirement in 1976)

However, Walter Wolf contacted Amon and persuaded him to drive for his Wolf–Williams team in the North American races near the end of the season. After recording some promising times in preparation for the Canadian GP, however, Amon was involved in a heavy collision with another car during qualifying and once again was lucky to walk away unharmed. He then did not take part in either the Canadian or United States Grands Prix.

==== 1977 ====
Amon turned down an offer of a full-time F1 drive for 1977, but did attempt a return to Can-Am racing in 1977 with a Wolf-Dallara WD1. However, after only one race he quit, saying "I'm just not enjoying this anymore". His place was taken by the young and then unknown Canadian Gilles Villeneuve, whom Amon would, later that year, recommend to Enzo Ferrari.

In the meantime, Amon returned once again to New Zealand, this time to retire from F1 motor racing for good.

=== 2000s ===
2003

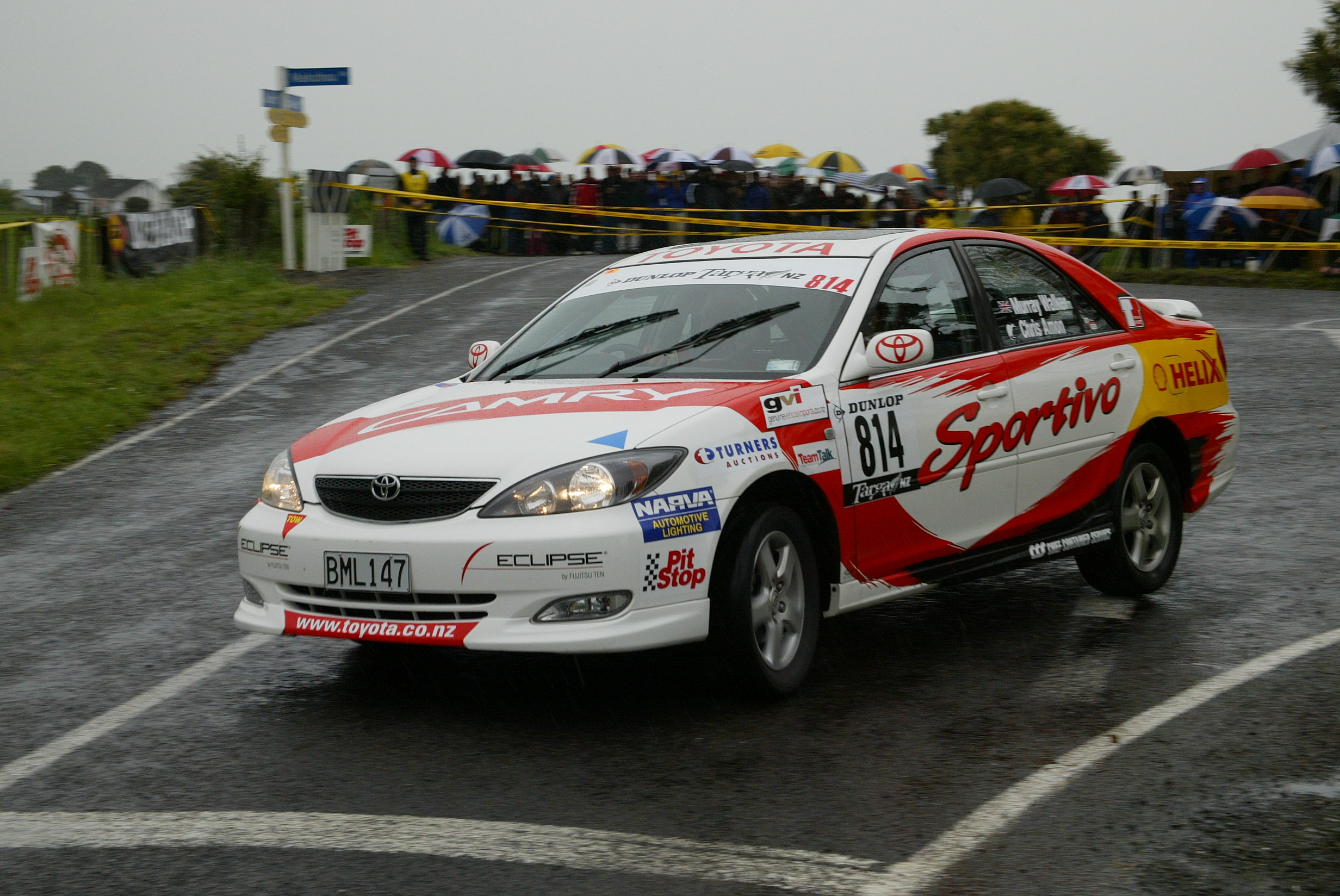
Chris Amon and Murray Walker, Dunlop Targa NZ 2003

Amon came out of retirement for a one-off appearance in the 2003 Dunlop Targa New Zealand with motorsport commentator Murray Walker as his navigator. The pair completed the week-long Auckland to Wellington Tarmac Rally in a Toyota Camry Sportivo, the same car previously used by Walker and Colin Bond in Australia's Targa Tasmania.

== Retirement ==
After his retirement from F1, Amon dedicated himself to running the family farm in New Zealand's Manawatū District for many years. After retiring from farming, he lived in Taupō in New Zealand's North Island. In the early 1980s he became more well known in New Zealand from test-driving vehicles on the TV motoring series Motor Show and later consulted for Toyota New Zealand, tuning the 1984 Toyota Corolla and subsequent cars for sale there. He also appeared in TV commercials for the company, where much was made of the acclaim he won from Enzo Ferrari. Amon participated in the 2004 EnergyWise Rally where he won ahead of Brian Cowan. Amon drove a Toyota Prius for the event.

In the 1993 Queen's Birthday Honours, Amon was appointed a Member of the Order of the British Empire, for services to motor sport.

Amon was involved in the design of the upgraded Taupo Motorsport Park circuit, used for the New Zealand round of the 2006–07 A1 Grand Prix season in January 2007. At the New Zealand Festival of Motor Racing in 2011, Amon's life and career were honoured with a selection of his cars being driven and also used the event to raise funds for the Bruce McLaren trust. Amon was also honoured at the festival in January 2013.

== Death ==
Amon died in Rotorua Hospital on 3 August 2016, aged 73, of cancer. He was survived by his wife Tish Wotherspoon, who married in 1977, their three children and their grandchildren. One of his sons, James, is a qualified High Performance personal trainer. He trained Central Districts Stags cricket team, and was revealed to be Brendon Hartley's personal trainer.

== Legacy ==
Amon is widely regarded as one of the best F1 drivers never to win a championship Grand Prix. His reputation for bad luck was such that fellow driver Mario Andretti once joked that "if he became an undertaker, people would stop dying". Former Ferrari Technical Director Mauro Forghieri stated that Amon was "by far the best test driver I have ever worked with. He had all the qualities to be a World Champion but bad luck just wouldn't let him be".

Despite never winning a championship Formula One Grand Prix, Amon won two non-championship GPs, the Silverstone International Trophy, the 1000 km Monza, the Daytona 24 Hours, six Tasman Series races and one series championship, and, perhaps most significant of all, the famous 24 Heures du Mans (alongside Bruce McLaren). These races included many of Amon's otherwise more successful fellow Formula One drivers. Amon also remains the only driver from New Zealand and Oceania to have raced for Scuderia Ferrari in Formula One.

In Formula One, Amon took part in 96 Grands Prix, achieving five poles, leading 183 laps in seven races, reaching the podium 11 times and scoring a total of 83 Championship points. Amon holds the record for the most different makes of car raced by a Formula 1 World Championship driver, with thirteen. A biography Forza Amon by journalist Eoin Young charts Amon's racing career and gives some insights into his personal life. The book makes clear one point on which Amon himself disagrees with most commentators, the issue of his bad luck. Amon has pointed out on several occasions that he competed for a decade and a half in Formula One and survived some serious accidents, notably in 1976, whilst others, including friends like Bruce McLaren, suffered serious injury and death. In 2008, motorsport journalist Alan Henry rated Chris Amon as his 13th greatest driver.

Reflecting on the 1968 racing death of Jim Clark, Amon said: "If this can happen to Jimmy, what chance do the rest of us have? I think we all felt that. It seemed like we'd lost our leader." In 1995, Amon was inducted into the New Zealand Sports Hall of Fame.

Amon's name has been given to the Toyota Racing Series driver's championship trophy, and the International Scholarship to support drivers who win his trophy to further their careers in single-seater racing. The Toyota Racing Series serves as motorsport's version of "winter ball" in New Zealand during January and February. Following his death, his name was also lent to the Manfeild Autocourse in Feilding, Manawatū.

== Racing record ==
=== Career summary ===
Season	Series	Team	Races	Wins	Poles	F/Laps	Podiums	Points	Position
1963	Formula One	Reg Parnell Racing	6	0	0	0	0	0	NC
1963	Australian Drivers' Championship	Scuderia Veloce	3	0	0	0	0	0	NC†
1963	British Saloon Car Championship	Sunbeam Talbot Ltd.	1	0	0	0	0	0	NC
1963	British Saloon Car Championship – Class B	Sunbeam Talbot Ltd.	1	0	0	0	0	0	NC
1964	Formula One	Reg Parnell Racing	8	0	0	0	0	2	16th
1964	Tasman Series	Reg Parnell Racing	4	0	0	0	0	0	NC
1964	Trophées de France	Midland Racing Partnership	2	0	0	0	0	2	18th
1964	24 Hours of Le Mans	Briggs S. Cunningham	1	0	0	0	0	N/A	DSQ
1965	British Formula Two	Ian Raby Racing	8	0	0	0	0	0	NC
1965	British Formula Two	Midland Racing Partnership	8	0	0	0	0	0	NC
1965	Formula One	Reg Parnell Racing	2	0	0	0	0	N/A	NC
1965	24 Hours of Le Mans	Shelby-American Inc.	1	0	0	0	0	N/A	DNF
1966	Can-Am	Bruce McLaren Motor Racing	6	0	0	1	2	10	6th
1966	British Sports Car Championship	Bruce McLaren Motor Racing	4	0	0	1	3	0	NC
1966	Formula One	Cooper Car Company	1	0	0	0	0	0	NC
1966	Formula One	Chris Amon Racing	1	0	0	0	0	0	NC
1966	24 Hours of Le Mans	Shelby-American Inc.	1	1	0	0	1	N/A	**1st**
1967	Formula One	Scuderia Ferrari	10	0	0	0	4	20	5th
1967	World Sportscar Championship	Scuderia Ferrari	3	2	?	?	2	N/A	NC
1967	Can-Am	North American Racing Team	3	0	0	0	0	2	12th
1967	Can-Am	Bill Harrah	3	0	0	0	0	2	12th
1967	24 Hours of Le Mans	Scuderia Ferrari	1	0	0	0	0	N/A	DNF
1967	24 Hours of Daytona	Scuderia Ferrari	1	1	?	?	1	N/A	**1st**
1968	Formula One	Scuderia Ferrari	11	0	3	0	1	10	10th
1968	Tasman Series	Chris Amon	8	2	1	5	4	36	**2nd**
1968	European Formula Two	Scuderia Ferrari	2	0	0	0	0	0	NC
1968	Can-Am	Modern Classic Motors	1	0	0	0	0	0	NC
1969	Can-Am	Chris Amon	8	0	0	1	3	39	6th
1969	Can-Am	McLaren Cars	8	0	0	1	3	39	6th
1969	Can-Am	Formula 1 Enterprises	8	0	0	1	3	39	6th
1969	Tasman Series	Scuderia Veloce	7	4	2	3	6	44	**1st**
1969	Formula One	Scuderia Ferrari	6	0	0	0	1	4	12th
1969	24 Hours of Le Mans	Scuderia Ferrari	1	0	0	0	0	N/A	DNF
1970	Formula One	March Engineering	13	0	0	1	3	23	8th
1970	Can-Am	March Engineering	3	0	0	0	0	28	11th
1971	Formula One	Equipe Matra Sports	10	0	1	0	1	9	11th
1971	Tasman Series	STP Corporation	5	0	0	0	2	15	5th
1971	24 Hours of Le Mans	Equipe Matra-Simca	1	0	0	0	0	N/A	DNF
1972	Formula One	Equipe Matra	11	0	1	2	1	12	10th
1972	24 Hours of Le Mans	Equipe Matra-Simca Shell	1	0	0	0	0	N/A	DNF
1973	European Touring Car Championship – Division 2	BMW Motorsport	5	1	2	2	2	32	7th
1973	European Touring Car Championship	BMW Motorsport	2	1	?	?	2	32	7th
1973	British Saloon Car Championship	BMW Motorsport	0	0	0	0	0	0	NC
1973	British Saloon Car Championship – Class D	BMW Motorsport	0	0	0	0	0	0	NC
1973	Formula One	Martini Racing Team	4	0	0	0	0	1	21st
1973	Formula One	Elf Team Tyrrell	1	0	0	0	0	1	21st
1973	24 Hours of Le Mans	BMW Motorsport	1	0	0	0	0	N/A	DNF
1974	Formula One	Team BRM	2	0	0	0	0	0	NC
1974	Formula One	Chris Amon Racing	1	0	0	0	0	0	NC
1975	Tasman Series	McCormack Racing	8	1	0	1	1	17	5th
1975	Formula One	HB Bewaking Team Ensign	2	0	0	0	0	0	NC
1975	SCCA/USAC Formula 5000	McCormack Racing	1	0	0	0	0	12	13th
1976	Formula One	Team Ensign	7	0	0	0	0	2	18th
1976	Formula One	Walter Wolf Racing	0	0	0	0	0	2	18th

^{†} As Amon was a guest driver, he was ineligible for championship points.

=== Formula One World Championship results ===
(key) (Races in bold indicate pole position; races in italics indicate fastest lap)

Year	Entrant	Chassis	Engine	1	2	3	4	5	6	7	8	9	10	11	12	13	14	15	16	WDC	Pts
1963	Reg Parnell Racing	Lola Mk4A	Climax FWMV 1.5 V8	MON; DNS	BEL; Ret	NED; Ret	FRA; 7	GBR; 7	GER; Ret	ITA; DNS	USA									NC	0
1963	Reg Parnell Racing	Lotus 24	BRM P56 1.5 V8									MEX; Ret	RSA							NC	0
1964	Reg Parnell Racing	Lotus 25	BRM P56 1.5 V8	MON; DNQ	NED; 5	BEL; Ret	FRA; 10	GBR; Ret	GER; 11			USA; Ret	MEX; Ret							16th	2
1964	Reg Parnell Racing	Lotus 25	Climax FWMV 1.5 V8							AUT; Ret	ITA									16th	2
1965	Reg Parnell Racing	Lotus 25	BRM P56 1.5 V8	RSA	MON	BEL	FRA; Ret			GER; Ret	ITA	USA	MEX							NC	0
1965	Ian Raby Racing	Brabham BT3	BRM P56 1.5 V8					GBR; DNS	NED											NC	0
1966	Bruce McLaren Motor Racing	McLaren M2B	Ford 406 3.0 V8	MON; DNA	BEL; DNA		GBR; DNA	NED; DNA												NC	0
1966	Cooper Car Company	Cooper T81	Maserati 9/F1 3.0 V12			FRA; 8			GER											NC	0
1966	Chris Amon Racing	Brabham BT11	BRM P60 1.9 V8							ITA; DNQ	USA	MEX								NC	0
1967	Scuderia Ferrari SpA SEFAC	Ferrari 312/67	Ferrari 242 3.0 V12	RSA	MON; 3	NED; 4	BEL; 3	FRA; Ret	GBR; 3	GER; 3	CAN; 6	ITA; 7	USA; Ret	MEX; 9						5th	20
1968	Scuderia Ferrari SpA SEFAC	Ferrari 312/67	Ferrari 242 3.0 V12	RSA; 4																10th	10
1968	Scuderia Ferrari SpA SEFAC	Ferrari 312/67/68	Ferrari 242 3.0 V12		**ESP**; Ret	MON	**BEL**; Ret													10th	10
1968	Scuderia Ferrari SpA SEFAC	Ferrari 312/68	Ferrari 242C 3.0 V12					**NED**; 6	FRA; 10	GBR; 2	GER; Ret	ITA; Ret	CAN; Ret	USA; Ret	MEX; Ret					10th	10
1969	Scuderia Ferrari SpA SEFAC	Ferrari 312/69	Ferrari 255C 3.0 V12	RSA; Ret	ESP; Ret	MON; Ret	NED; 3	FRA; Ret	GBR; Ret	GER	ITA	CAN	USA	MEX						12th	4
1970	March Engineering	March 701	Ford Cosworth DFV 3.0 V8	RSA; Ret	ESP; Ret	MON; Ret	BEL; 2	NED; Ret	FRA; 2	GBR; 5	GER; Ret	AUT; 8	ITA; 7	CAN; 3	USA; 5	MEX; 4				8th	23
1971	Équipe Matra Sports	Matra MS120B	Matra MS71 3.0 V12	RSA; 5	ESP; 3	MON; Ret	NED; Ret	FRA; 5	GBR; Ret	GER; Ret	AUT	**ITA**; 6	CAN; 10	USA; 12						11th	9
1972	Équipe Matra	Matra MS120C	Matra MS72 3.0 V12	ARG; DNS	RSA; 15	ESP; Ret	MON; 6	BEL; 6		GBR; 4										10th	12
1972	Équipe Matra	Matra MS120D	Matra MS72 3.0 V12						**FRA**; 3		GER; 15	AUT; 5	ITA; Ret	CAN; 6	USA; 15					10th	12
1973	Martini Racing Team	Tecno PA123-006	Tecno Series-P 3.0 F12	ARG	BRA	RSA	ESP	BEL; 6	MON; Ret	SWE	FRA	GBR; Ret	NED; Ret	GER	AUT; DNS	ITA				21st	1
1973	Elf Team Tyrrell	Tyrrell 005	Ford Cosworth DFV 3.0 V8														CAN; 10	USA; DNS		21st	1
1974	Chris Amon Racing	Amon AF101	Ford Cosworth DFV 3.0 V8	ARG	BRA	RSA	ESP; Ret	BEL	MON; DNS	SWE	NED	FRA	GBR	GER; DNQ	AUT	ITA; DNQ				NC	0
1974	Team BRM	BRM P201	BRM P200 3.0 V12														CAN; NC	USA; 9		NC	0
1975	HB Bewaking Team Ensign	Ensign N175	Ford Cosworth DFV 3.0 V8	ARG	BRA	RSA	ESP	MON	BEL	SWE	NED	FRA	GBR	GER	AUT; 12	ITA; 12	USA			NC	0
1976	Team Ensign	Ensign N174	Ford Cosworth DFV 3.0 V8	BRA	RSA; 14	USW; 8	ESP; 5													18th	2
1976	Team Ensign	Ensign N176	Ford Cosworth DFV 3.0 V8					BEL; Ret	MON; 13	SWE; Ret	FRA	GBR; Ret	GER; Ret	AUT	NED	ITA				18th	2
1976	Walter Wolf Racing	Wolf–Williams FW05	Ford Cosworth DFV 3.0 V8														CAN; DNS	USA	JPN	18th	2

=== Non-championship Formula One results ===
(key) (Races in bold indicate pole position; races in italics indicate fastest lap)

Year	Entrant	Chassis	Engine	1	2	3	4	5	6	7	8	9	10	11	12	13	14
1963	Reg Parnell Racing	Lola Mk4A	Climax FWMV 1.5 V8	LOM	GLV; 5	PAU	IMO	SYR	AIN; 6	INT; Ret	ROM	SOL; Ret	KAN; DNA	MED	AUT; 4	OUL	RAN
1964	Reg Parnell Racing	Lotus 25	BRM P56 1.5 V8	DMT; 5	NWT	SYR; 5	AIN; Ret	INT; 5	SOL; Ret	MED; 4	RAN						
1965	Scuderia Centro Sud	BRM P57	BRM P56 1.5 V8	ROC	SYR	SMT	INT; Ret										
1965	Reg Parnell Racing	Lotus 25	BRM P56 1.5 V8					MED; Ret	RAN								
1967	Scuderia Ferrari SpA SEFAC	Ferrari 312/66	Ferrari 218 3.0 V12	ROC; DNS	SPC	INT	SYR	OUL	ESP								
1968	Scuderia Ferrari SpA SEFAC	Ferrari 312/67	Ferrari 242 3.0 V12	ROC; 4	INT; 3												
1968	Scuderia Ferrari SpA SEFAC	Ferrari 312/68	Ferrari 242C 3.0 V12			OUL; 2											
1969	Scuderia Ferrari SpA SEFAC	Ferrari 312/69	Ferrari 255C 3.0 V12	ROC	INT; 10	MAD	OUL										
1970	March Engineering	March 701	Ford Cosworth DFV 3.0 V8	ROC; Ret	**INT**; 1	OUL											
1971	Équipe Matra Sports	Matra MS120	Matra MS71 3.0 V12	ARG; 1	ROC												
1971	Équipe Matra Sports	Matra MS120B	Matra MS71 3.0 V12			QUE; 4	SPR	**INT**; 12	RIN	OUL	VIC						
1972	Frank Williams Racing Cars	Politoys FX3	Ford Cosworth DFV 3.0 V8	ROC	BRA	INT	OUL	REP	VIC; Ret								
1974	Chris Amon Racing	Amon AF101	Ford Cosworth DFV 3.0 V8	PRE	ROC	INT; DNS											
1975	HB Bewaking Team Ensign	Ensign N175	Ford Cosworth DFV 3.0 V8	ROC	INT	SUI; 9											
1976	Team Ensign	Ensign N174	Ford Cosworth DFV 3.0 V8	ROC; 5	INT; DNS												

=== Complete Tasman Series results ===
(key) (Races in bold indicate pole position; races in italics indicate fastest lap)

Year	Team	Chassis	Engine	1	2	3	4	5	6	7	8	Rank	Pts
1964	Reg Parnell Racing	Lola Mk4A	Climax FPF 2.5 L4	LEV; Ret	PUK; Ret	WIG; Ret	TER; Ret	SAN	WAR	LAK	LON	NC	0
1968	Chris Amon	Dino 246 Tasmania	Ferrari 2.4 V6	PUK; 1	**LEV**; 1	WIG; 2	**TER**; 4	**SUR**; Ret	WAR; 4	SAN; 2	LON; 7	2nd	36
1969	Scuderia Veloce	Dino 246 Tasmania	Ferrari 2.4 V6	**PUK**; 1	LEV; 1	WIG; 3	TER; 3	**LAK**; 1	WAR; Ret	SAN; 1		1st	44
1971	STP Corporation	March 701	Ford Cosworth DFW 2.5 V8	LEV; 3		WIG; 5	TER					5th	15
1971	STP Corporation	Lotus 70	Ford Cosworth DFW 2.5 V8		PUK; 9			WAR; 2	SAN; 4	SUR		5th	15
1975	McCormack Racing	Talon MR1	Chevrolet 5.0 V8	LEV; Ret	PUK; 7	WIG; Ret	TER; 1	WAR; 4	SUR; Ret	AIR; 4	SAN; 5	5th	17

=== Complete British Saloon Car Championship results ===
(key) (Races in bold indicate pole position; races in italics indicate fastest lap.)

Year	Team	Car	Class	1	2	3	4	5	6	7	8	9	10	11	Pos.	Pts	Class
1963	Sunbeam-Talbot Ltd	Sunbeam Rapier Series IIIA	B	SNE	OUL	GOO	AIN	SIL ?	CRY	SIL	BRH	BRH	OUL	SIL	NC	0	NC
1973	BMW Motorsport	BMW 3.0 CSL	D	BRH	SIL	THR	THR	SIL	ING	BRH	SIL; DNS	BRH			NC	0	NC

=== Complete 24 Hours of Le Mans results ===
Year	Team	Co-drivers	Car	Class	Laps	Pos.	Class pos.
1964	(United States) Briggs S. Cunningham	(Germany) Jochen Neerpasch	Shelby Cobra Daytona-Ford	GT +3.0	131	DSQ	DSQ
1965	(United States) Shelby-American Inc.	(United States) Phil Hill	Ford GT40 Mk.II	P +5.0	89	DNF	DNF
1966	(United States) Shelby-American Inc.	(New Zealand) Bruce McLaren	Ford GT40 Mk.II	P +5.0	360	**1st**	**1st**
1967	(Italy) SpA Ferrari SEFAC	(Italy) Nino Vaccarella	Ferrari 330 P3 Spyder	P +5.0	105	DNF	DNF
1969	(Italy) SpA Ferrari SEFAC	(Switzerland) Peter Schetty	Ferrari 312P Coupe	P 3.0	0	DNF	DNF
1971	(France) Equipe Matra-Simca	(France) Jean-Pierre Beltoise	Matra-Simca MS660	P 3.0		DNF	DNF
1972	(France) Equipe Matra-Simca Shell	(France) Jean-Pierre Beltoise	Matra-Simca MS670	S 3.0	1	DNF	DNF
1973	(Germany) BMW Motorsport	(Germany) Hans-Joachim Stuck	BMW 3.0CSL	T 5.0	160	DNF	DNF

== See also ==
- Formula One drivers from New Zealand

Sporting positions
Preceded by Jochen Rindt; Masten Gregory	Winner of the 24 Hours of Le Mans; 1966; With: Bruce McLaren	Succeeded by Dan Gurney; A. J. Foyt
Preceded by Jim Clark	Tasman Series; Champion; 1969	Succeeded by Graeme Lawrence
Preceded by Jack Brabham	BRDC International Trophy; Winner; 1970	Succeeded by Graham Hill
