= Johnnie Walker (racing driver) =

Australian racing driver (1944–2024)

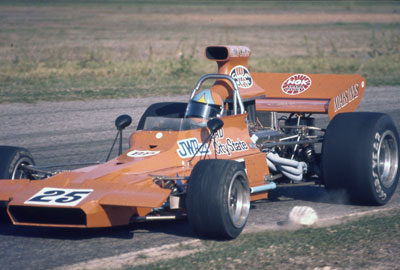
Walker in the Matich A50 in 1972

John Walker (3 September 1944 – 6 May 2024) was an Australian racing driver.

== Biography ==
Johnnie Walker was born in Adelaide, South Australia on 27 September 1943, He first raced in the early 1960s at Mallala in his Holden FE road car. After competing in the Australian Formula 2 Championship, he graduated to Formula 5000 in 1972, driving an Elfin MR5 and a Matich A50 before switching to the Lola marque in late 1973.

Walker finished second in both the 1973 and 1975 Australian Drivers' Championships before breaking through to win the title in 1979 in his Lola T332 Chevrolet. He also won the 1979 Australian Grand Prix at Wanneroo Raceway.

In 1975, Walker was highly competitive in the Tasman Series going into the final round at Sandown as equal series leader with Warwick Brown and Graeme Lawrence. However he crashed his Lola on the first lap demolishing 50 metres of the horse racetrack's running rails.

Walker drove several touring car races for the Holden Dealer Team in 1975-1976 including co-driving with Colin Bond in the 1975 Hardie Ferodo 1000 where they placed third in a Holden Torana SL/R 5000 L34.

Walker died on 6 May 2024, at the age of 79.

== Career results ==
Results sourced from Driver Database.

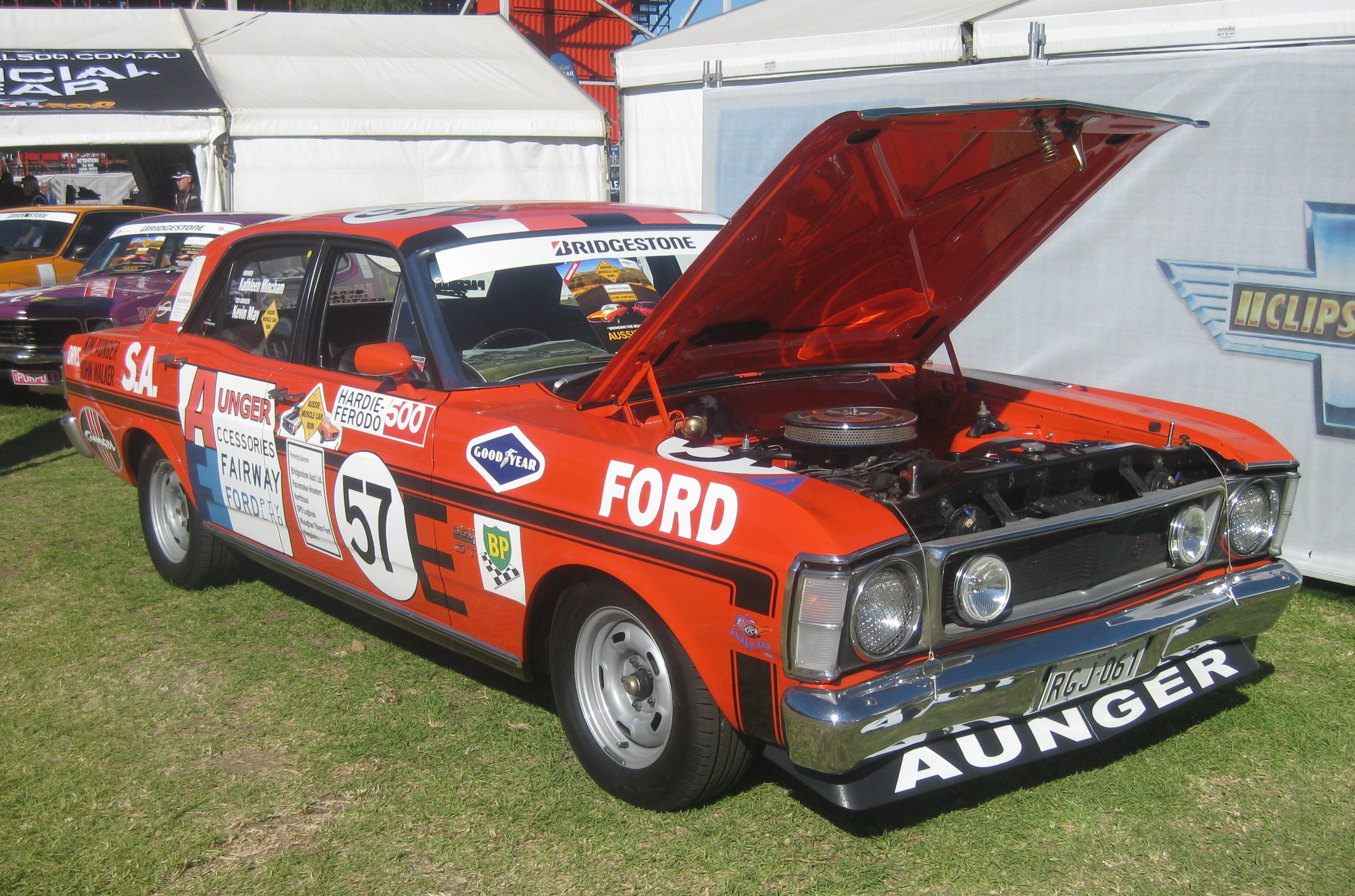
A race replica of the Ford XW Falcon GTHO driven by Kim Aunger and John Walker in the 1970 Hardie-Ferodo 500

Season	Series	Position	Car	Team
1965	Australian Drivers' Championship	10th	Elfin Catalina Ford	Gilbert Motor Bodies
1967	Australian Drivers' Championship	18th	Elfin Mono	Gilbert Motor Bodies
1967	Australian 1½ Litre Championship	9th	Elfin Mono	Gilbert Motor Bodies
1968	Australian Drivers' Championship	9th	Elfin Mono 2B Ford	Gilbert Motor Bodies
1968	Australian 1½ Litre Championship	4th	Elfin Mono 2B Ford	Gilbert Motor Bodies
1969	Australian Drivers' Championship	NC	Elfin 600B Ford	Gilbert Motor Bodies
1970	Australian Drivers' Championship	NC	Elfin 600B Ford	Gilbert Motor Bodies
1970	Australian Formula 2 Championship	**2nd**	Elfin	Gilbert Motor Bodies
1971	Australian Drivers' Championship	13th	Elfin 600B	City State Racing Team
1971	Australian Formula 2 Championship	4th	Elfin 600B Ford	
1972	Tasman Series	12th	Elfin MR5 Repco-Holden	City State Racing Team
1972	Australian Drivers' Championship	4th	Matich A50 Repco-Holden	5AD / City State Racing
1973	Tasman Series	9th	Matich A50 Repco-Holden	Johnnie Walker
1973	Australian Drivers' Championship	**2nd**	Lola T330 Repco-Holden	John Walker Motor Racing
1973	SCCA L&M Championship	21st	Matich A50 Repco-Holden	Johnnie Walker
1974	Tasman Series	4th	Lola T330 Repco-Holden	
1974	Australian Formula 2 Championship	7th	Elfin 622	
1975	Tasman Series	**2nd**	Lola T332 Repco-Holden	
1975	Australian Drivers' Championship	**2nd**	Lola T332 Repco-Holden	John Walker
1978	Rothmans International Series	4th	Lola T332 Chevrolet	Magnum Wheels
1979	Rothmans International Series	11th	Lola T332 Chevrolet	Magnum Wheels
1979	Australian Drivers' Championship	**1st**	Lola T332 Chevrolet	Magnum Wheels
1981	Australian Sports Car Championship	4th	Porsche Turbo	Magnum Wheels

=== Complete Tasman Series results ===
(key) (Races in bold indicate pole position) (Races in italics indicate fastest lap)

Year	Team	Car	1	2	3	4	5	6	7	8	DC	Points
1972	(Australia) City State Racing	Elfin MR5 Repco-Holden	PUK	LEV	WIG	TER	SUR	WAR	SAN	AIR; 4	12th	3
1973	(Australia) Johnnie Walker	Elfin MR5 Repco-Holden	PUK	LEV	WIG	TER	SUR; 4	WAR; 4	SAN; 5	AIR; Ret	9th	8
1974	(Australia) Johnnie Walker	Lola T330 Repco-Holden	LEV; 1	PUK; 7	WIG; Ret	TER; Ret	ORA; 2	SUR; 5	SAN; 3	AIR; Ret	3rd	21
1975	(Australia) Johnnie Walker	Lola T332 Repco-Holden	LEV; 4	PUK; 4	WIG; 3	TER; 4	ORA; 3	SUR; 1	AIR; 3	SAN; Ret	2nd	30

=== Complete Bathurst 500/1000 results ===
Year	Team	Co-drivers	Car	Class	Laps	Pos.	Class pos.
1970	(Australia) Aunger Accessories / Fairway Ford	(Australia) Kym Aunger	Ford XW Falcon GTHO Phase II	E	18	DNF	DNF
1971	(Australia) City State Racing Team	(Australia) Malcolm Ramsay	Holden LC Torana GTR XU-1	D	124	18th	11th
1975	(Australia) Holden Dealer Team	(Australia) Colin Bond	Holden LH Torana SL/R 5000 L34	D	154	**3rd**	**3rd**
1978	(Australia) Settlement Road Motor Wreckers	(Australia) Warren Cullen	Holden LX Torana SS A9X Hatchback	A	152	7th	7th

Sporting positions
Preceded by Graham McRae	Australian Grand Prix; Winner; 1979	Succeeded by Alan Jones
Preceded by Graham McRae	Australian Drivers' Championship; Champion; 1979	Succeeded by Alfredo Costanzo
