= 1975 New Zealand Grand Prix =

- Race 3 of 8 in 1975 Tasman Series
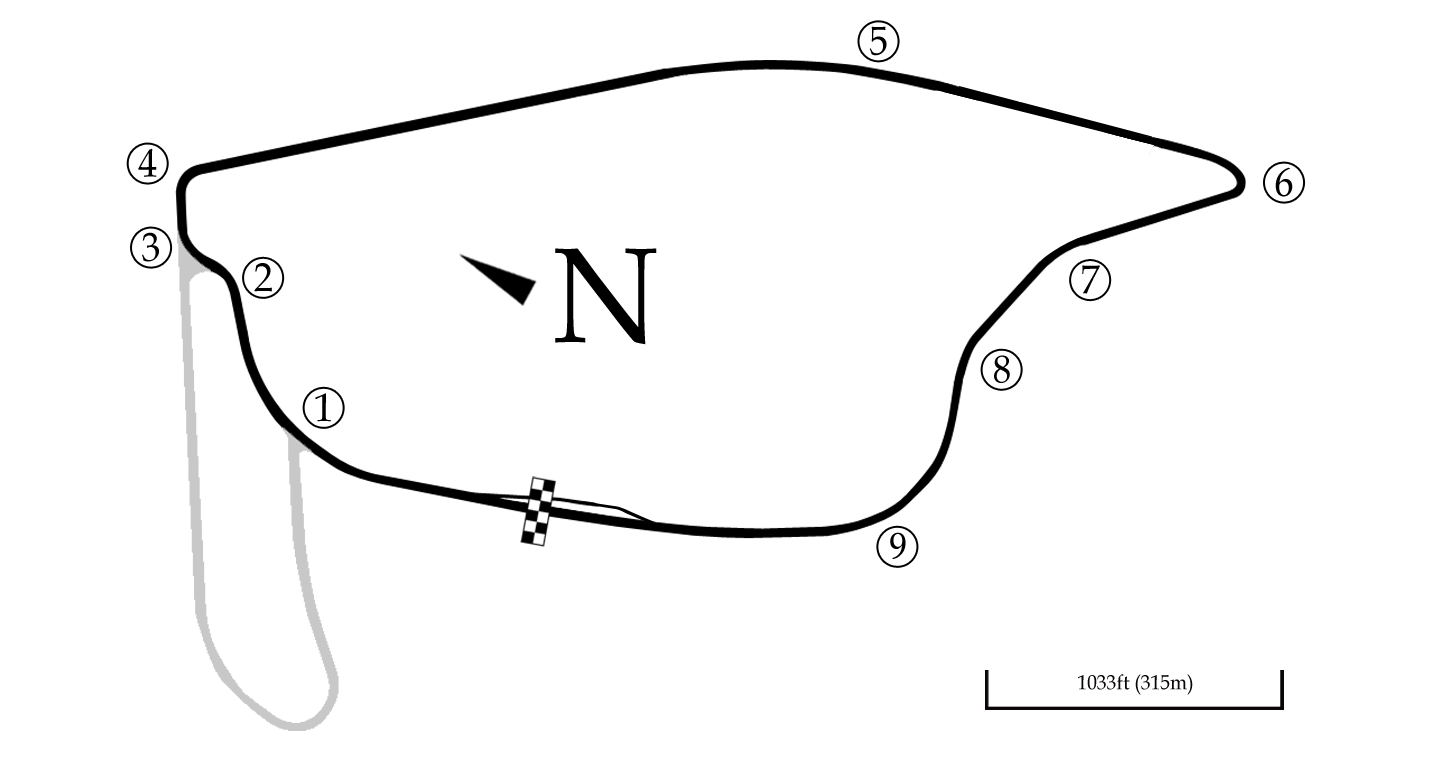

Race details
- Date: 12 January 1975
- Location: Pukekohe Park Raceway, Pukekohe, New Zealand
- Course: Permanent racing facility
- Course length: 2.82 km (1.76 miles)
- Distance: 58 laps, 164 km (102 miles)
- Weather: Overcast

Pole position
Driver	(New Zealand) Graham McRae	McRae-Chevrolet
- Time: 1:00.5

Fastest lap
Driver	(New Zealand) Chris Amon	Talon-Chevrolet
- Time: 1:03.8

Podium
First	(Australia) Warwick Brown	Lola-Chevrolet
Second	(New Zealand) Jim Murdoch	Begg-Chevrolet
Third	(New Zealand) Graeme Lawrence	Lola-Chevrolet

The 1975 New Zealand Grand Prix was a race held at the Pukekohe Park Raceway on 12 January 1975. The race had 20 starters.

It was the 21st New Zealand Grand Prix, and doubled as the second round of the 1975 Tasman Series. Australian Warwick Brown won his first NZGP in his Lola T332 with a dominant performance where he lapped the entire field in the 58-lap race. The rest of the podium was completed by New Zealanders Jim Murdoch and Graeme Lawrence.

== Classification ==
Pos	No.	Driver	Team	Car	Laps	Time
1	2	(Australia) Warwick Brown	Pat Burke Racing	Lola T332 / Chevrolet 4995cc V8	58	1hr 9min 53.4sec
2	19	(New Zealand) Jim Murdoch	Begg & Allen Ltd.	Begg 018 / Chevrolet 4995cc V8	57	+ 1 Lap
3	14	(New Zealand) Graeme Lawrence	Marlboro / Wix / Singapore Airlines	Lola T332 / Chevrolet 4995cc V8	57	+ 1 Lap
4	7	(Australia) Johnnie Walker	Walker Racing	Lola T332 / Repco 4994cc V8	57	+ 1 Lap
5	11	(New Zealand) Ken Smith	La Valise Travel Ltd.	Lola T332 / Chevrolet 4995cc V8	57	+ 1 Lap
6	9	(New Zealand) John McCormack	Ansett Team	Elfin MR6 / Repco 4994cc V8	56	+ 2 Laps
7	1	(New Zealand) Chris Amon	Jack MacCormack	Talon MR1 / Chevrolet 4995cc V8	56	+ 2 Laps
8	6	(Australia) Max Stewart	Max Stewart Motors	Lola T400 / Chevrolet 4995cc V8	55	+ 3 Laps
9	69	(New Zealand) Steve Millen	David Schollum	Chevron B20 / Cosworth 1840cc 4cyl	54	+ 4 Laps
10	17	(New Zealand) Robbie Booth	David Motors Ltd.	Begg FM4 / Chevrolet 4995cc V8	54	+ 4 Laps
11	12	(New Zealand) Baron Robertson	Robertson Racing	Elfin MR5 / Repco 4994cc V8	52	+ 6 Laps
12	15	(New Zealand) Frank Bray	Brambies (NZ) Freighters Racing Team	Brabham BT29 / Cosworth 1950cc 4cyl	49	+ 9 Laps
Ret	5	(Australia) Kevin Bartlett	Chesterfield Racing	Lola T400 / Chevrolet 4995cc V8	46	Gearbox
Ret	22	(New Zealand) Graham McRae		McRae GM2 / Chevrolet 4995cc V8	9	Handling

Preceded by none	Tasman Series; 1975	Succeeded by 1973 Levin International
Preceded by 1974 New Zealand Grand Prix	New Zealand Grand Prix; 1975	Succeeded by 1976 New Zealand Grand Prix
