= Rothmans International Series =

1970s Australian motor racing series

- Category: Single seaters Formula 5000; Formula 1 Formula Pacific
- Country: Australia
- Inaugural season: 1976
- Folded: 1979
- Last Drivers' champion: (Australia) Larry Perkins
- Last Teams' champion: Ansett Team Elfin

The Rothmans International Series was an Australian motor racing series which was staged annually from 1976 to 1979. Initially open to Australian Formula 1 cars (commonly referred to as Formula 5000s), for the final year it was for ‘’Australian Formula 5000’’, ‘’World Formula 1’’ and ‘’Australian Formula Pacific’’ cars.

== History ==
When the joint Australian-New Zealand open-wheeler series, the Tasman Series was discontinued after the 1975 series, the four Australian former Tasman races became the Rothmans International Series.

The series was run during February of each year from 1976 to 1979, with races at Sandown, Adelaide International Raceway, Oran Park and Surfers Paradise International Raceway.

Future (1983) 24 Hours of Le Mans winner Vern Schuppan, driving for Theodore Racing, won the 1976 Rothmans International Series in a Lola T332-Chevrolet with the final round at Surfers Paradise being washed out. Former Tasman Series winner Warwick Brown won the 1977 and 1978 Rothmans titles driving the Lola for the VDS team. Former Formula One driver and future six time Bathurst 1000 winner Larry Perkins was the final series winner in 1979 in an Elfin MR8-Chevrolet driving for Ansett Team Elfin.

Some notable drivers who competed in the Rothmans International Series included future (1980) Formula One World Champion Alan Jones, former Tasman Series champion Englishman Peter Gethin, 1974 Bathurst 1000 and 1976 Australian Grand Prix winner John Goss, twice Gold Star winner Kevin Bartlett, triple Australian Grand Prix and Tasman Series champion Kiwi Graham McRae, three time Gold Star winner John McCormack, and future four-time Australian Drivers Champion Alfredo Costanzo. Colin Bond, the 1969 Bathurst 500 winner as well as being a three time Australian Rally champion and the 1975 Australian Touring Car Champion, also drove in the 1979 series as did Kiwi Jim Richards who would go on to win multiple big races and championships including 4 Australian Touring Car Championships and 7 Bathurst 1000's.

== List of series winners ==
Year	Driver	Car	Team
1976	(Australia) Vern Schuppan	Lola T332-Chevrolet	(Hong Kong) Theodore Racing
1977	(Australia) Warwick Brown	Lola T430-Chevrolet	(Belgium) Racing Team VDS
1978	(Australia) Warwick Brown	Lola T332-Chevrolet	(Belgium) Racing Team VDS
1979	(Australia) Larry Perkins	Elfin MR8-Chevrolet	(Australia) Ansett Team Elfin
