= Warwick Brown =

Australian racing driver (born 1949)

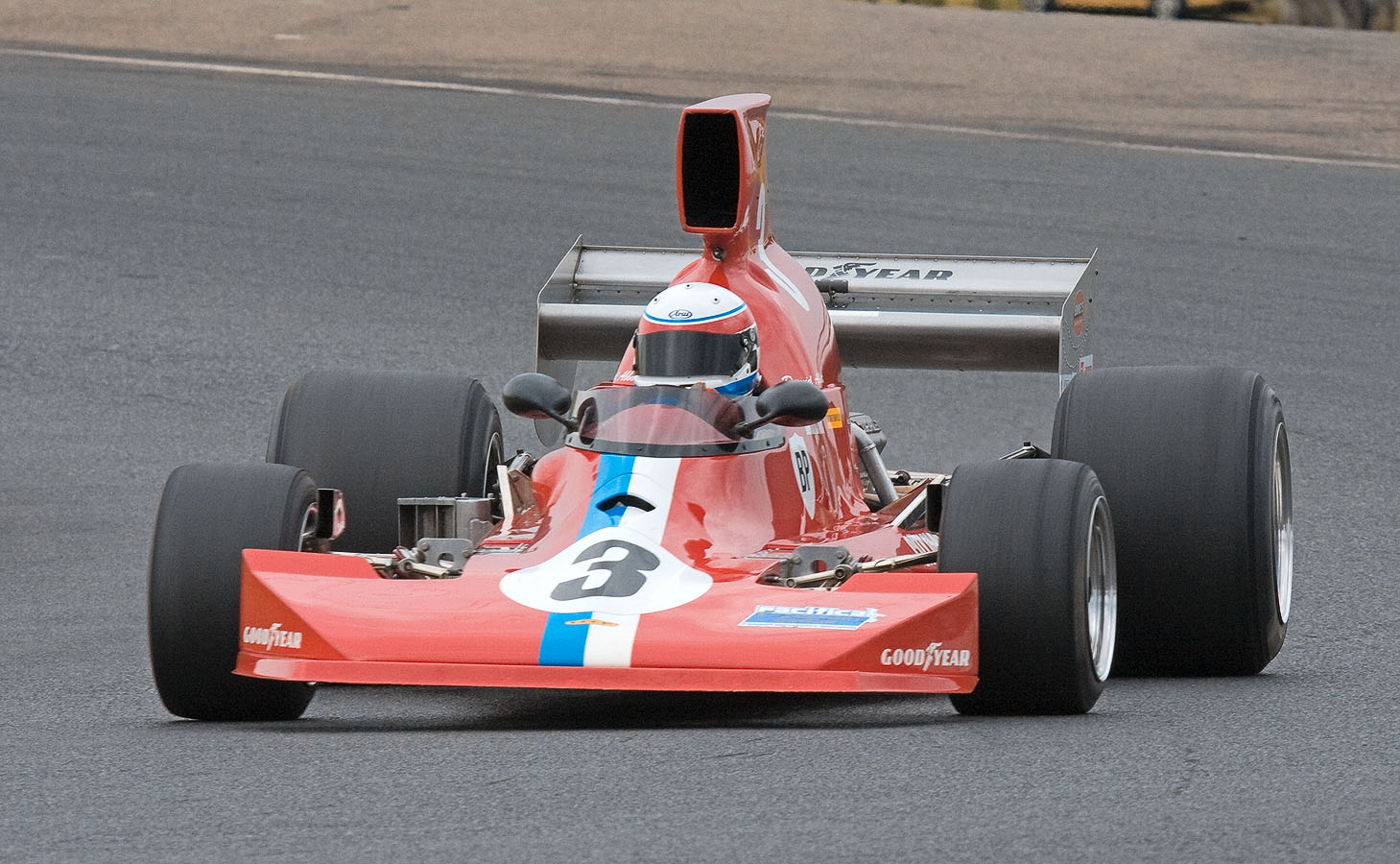
- Brown won the 1977 Rothmans International Series, including the 1977 Australian Grand Prix, driving Lola T430 HU2, pictured above in its 1977 livery.
- Born: 24 December 1949 (age 76); Sydney, Australia

Formula One World Championship career
- Nationality: (Australia) Australian
- Active years: 1976
- Team: Wolf–Williams
- Entries: 1
- Championships: 0
- Wins: 0
- Podiums: 0
- Career points: 0
- Pole positions: 0
- Fastest laps: 0
- First entry: 1976 United States Grand Prix

Warwick Brown (born 24 December 1949) is a former racing driver from Australia.

== Racing career ==
Brown participated in a single Formula One Grand Prix, on 10 October 1976. He drove a Wolf–Williams Racing car at the 1976 United States Grand Prix and finished 14th, five laps behind the winner James Hunt. Brown suffered the loss of third and fifth gears during the race, as well as rear brake problems.

Brown was more successful in the Tasman Series, which he won in 1975, driving a Lola T332 Chevrolet. He also won the Rothmans International Series in Australia twice, in 1977 driving a Lola T430 Chevrolet and in 1978 driving a Lola T332 Chevrolet, both for the VDS Team. In the course of winning these series, Brown also won the 1975 New Zealand Grand Prix and the 1977 Australian Grand Prix.

After competing in the SCCA/USAC Formula 5000 Championship in North America from 1974 to 1976, Brown contested the Can-Am Series and was the runner-up to fellow Australian Alan Jones in the 1978 US Can-Am Series driving a Lola T333CS-Chevrolet for the VDS Team.

== Career summary ==
Season	Series	Position	Car	Team
1971	Australian Drivers' Championship	7th	McLaren M4A Cosworth	Pat Burke Racing
1972	Tasman Series	13th	McLaren M10B Chevrolet	Pat Burke Racing
1972	Australian Drivers' Championship	5th	McLaren M10B Chevrolet	Pat Burke Racing
1973	Tasman Series	7th	Lola T300 Chevrolet	Team Target
1974	Tasman Series	6th	Lola T332 Chevrolet	Pat Burke Racing
1974	Australian Drivers' Championship	8th	Lola T332 Chevrolet	Pat Burke Racing
1974	SCCA/USAC Formula 5000 Championship	7th	Lola T332 Chevrolet	Pat Burke Racing
1975	Tasman Series	1st	Lola T332 Chevrolet	Pat Burke Racing
1975	SCCA/USAC Formula 5000 Championship	7th	Talon MR1A Chevrolet	Jack McCormack Racing
1976	SCCA/USAC Formula 5000 Championship	7th	Lola T332C Chevrolet; Lola T430 Chevrolet	Bay Racing; Racing Team VDS
1977	Rothmans International Series	1st	Lola T430 Chevrolet	Racing Team VDS
1978	Rothmans International Series	1st	Lola T332 Chevrolet	Racing Team VDS
1978	Can-Am Series	2nd	Lola T333CS Chevrolet	Racing Team VDS
1979	Rothmans International Series	3rd	Lola T333CS Chevrolet	Racing Team VDS

=== Complete Formula One results ===
(key)

Year	Entrant	Chassis	Engine	1	2	3	4	5	6	7	8	9	10	11	12	13	14	15	16	WDC	Pts
1976	Walter Wolf Racing	Wolf–Williams FW05	Ford Cosworth DFV 3.0 V8	BRA	RSA	USW	ESP	BEL	MON	SWE	FRA	GBR	GER	AUT	NED	ITA	CAN	USA; 14	JPN	NC	0

Sporting positions
Preceded by Peter Gethin	Tasman Series Champion; 1975	Succeeded by None
Preceded by John McCormack	New Zealand Grand Prix; Winner; 1975	Succeeded by Ken Smith
Preceded by John Goss	Australian Grand Prix; Winner; 1977	Succeeded by Graham McRae
