= Lola T430 =

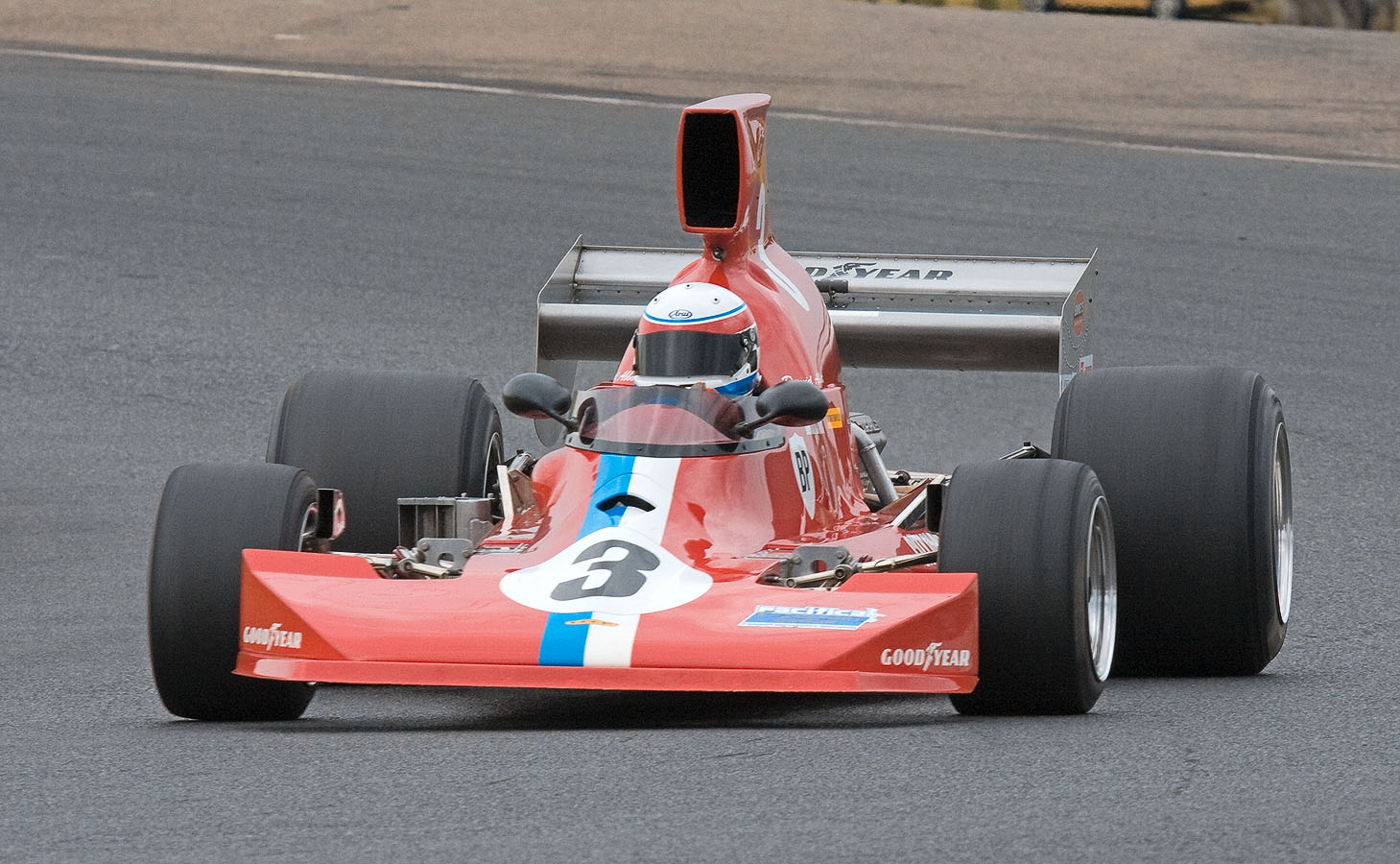
- Category: Formula 5000
- Constructor: Lola Cars
- Designer: Eric Broadley

Technical specifications
- Chassis: Steel and aluminium monocoque with load-bearing engine-transmission assembly
- Suspension: Inboard springs and Fox shocks front and rear, operated by top rocker arm with front and lower rear A arms of streamline tubing
- Engine: mid-engine, longitudinally mounted, 4,940 cc (301.5 cu in), Chevrolet, 90° V8, NA mid-engine, longitudinally mounted, 4,994 cc (304.8 cu in), Repco Holden, 90° V8, NA
- Transmission: Hewland DG300 5-speed manual
- Weight: 670–800 kg (1,480–1,760 lb)

Competition history
- Debut: 1976

The Lola T430 is an open-wheel formula race car, designed, developed and built by British manufacturer and constructor Lola Cars, for Formula 5000 racing, in 1976.
