= Lola T332 =

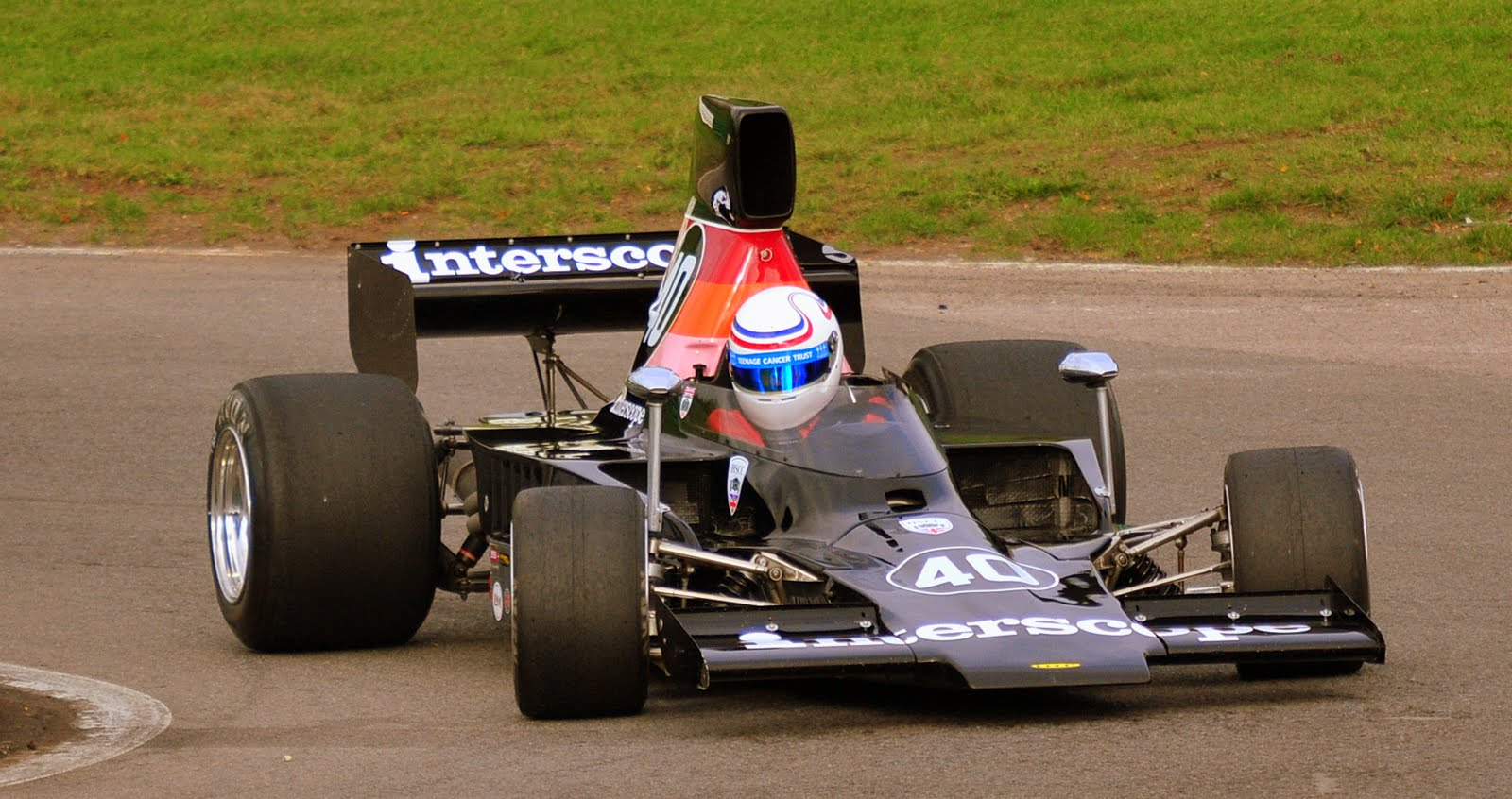
- Lola T332 at Mallory Park, October 2009.
- Category: Formula 5000
- Constructor: Lola Cars
- Designer: Eric Broadley

Technical specifications
- Chassis: Steel and aluminium monocoque with load-bearing engine-transmission assembly
- Suspension (front): Independent, wishbones and inclined coil spring/shock absorber units
- Suspension (rear): Independent, single top link, twin tower links and coil spring/shock absorber units
- Axle track: Front: 1,625 mm (64.0 in); Rear: 1,625 mm (64.0 in)
- Wheelbase: 2,591 mm (102.0 in)
- Engine: Mid-engine, longitudinally mounted, 4,940 cc (301.5 cu in), Chevrolet, 90° V8, NA; Mid-engine, longitudinally mounted, 4,994 cc (304.8 cu in), Repco Holden, 90° V8, NA
- Transmission: Hewland DG300 Five-speed manual
- Power: 500–600 hp (373–447 kW); 325–420 lb⋅ft (441–569 N⋅m)
- Weight: 650–665 kg (1,433–1,466 lb)

Competition history
- Notable entrants: Penske Motorsport; Carl Hass Racing; Team VDS; Vel's Parnelli Jones Racing
- Notable drivers: (Australia) Kevin Bartlett (Australia) Warwick Brown (New Zealand) Graeme Lawrence (Australia) Alan Jones (United States) Mario Andretti (United Kingdom) David Hobbs (United Kingdom) Brian Redman (Australia) Johnnie Walker (Australia) Vern Schuppan (United States) Sam Posey
- Debut: 1973

The Lola T332 was a race car designed and built by Lola Cars for use in Formula 5000 racing and made its racing debut in 1973. The T332 was successful around the globe with race victories in places such as Australia, the United Kingdom, New Zealand and the United States. The Lola commonly used the 5.0-litre Chevrolet V8 engine, though some competitors in Australia and New Zealand used the slightly cheaper and less powerful Australian made 5.0-litre Repco Holden V8. The T332 was a refinement to the previous T330 model, and was considered by Lola Cars to be their most successful Formula 5000 car of its time.

== Race history ==
The alloy/steel tub of the T332 followed standard Lola design practice with twin bulkheads and utilised a semi-stressed engine and transmission. Twin side radiators were mounted in front of the rear wheels which were located by upper and lower links and radius rods. Driven through a Hewland DG300 five-speed transmission, a Chevrolet powered T332 was once timed at 305 km/h (190 mph) at the now closed Ontario Motor Speedway in Ontario, California.

The T332 dominated the last three years of the US F5000 championship, with Briton Brian Redman taking the title three times in a row in 1974–76, his most serious rivals Al Unser and Mario Andretti, in 1974–75 in Parnelli T332C. Australian driver Warwick Brown used a T332 to win the 1975 Tasman Series as well as the 1975 New Zealand Grand Prix. In doing so he became the only Australian driver to ever win the Tasman Series. New Zealand driver Ken Smith also used a Lola T332 to win the 1976 New Zealand Grand Prix. Ken Smith had obtained Redman's 1974 US winning chassis and a couple of extremely powerful US F5000 chevy engines. Lawrence, after a serious accident in the 72 NZGP regained competitive form in a new T332 in the 1974 Tasman and by 1975 had upgraded his chassis to the specs of Andretti's US car and running with real sponsorship from Malboro, Singapore Airlines and Wix, was Warwick Brown's most serious rival during the 1975 Tasman. As a side note, both the 1975 and 1976 New Zealand Grands Prix were held at Pukekohe Park Raceway. It was generally thought in the 1975 Tasman the two best drivers, Graham McRae in a McRae GM2 and Chris Amon in a Talon (a modified version of the GM2) were very much at a disadvantage compared with Lawrence, Brown and Smith in the Lola 332T, although to some extent that was compensated by the very fast Firestone F5000 tyres used by McRae for the last time in NZ which meant McRae took pole or deadheated for pole time in the four kiwi rounds of the last Tasman. McRae himself found his own T332 far faster than his GM2 in the 1974/75 US Travellers Cheque F5000 series. Although not able to equal the engine preparation of the Haas or Parnelli teams running at F1 level, even in 1975 at Watkins Glen, Laguna Seca and Long Beach, McRae in a T332 was still as quick as Jarier or Unser while his T332 lasted. In Australasia the T400 never matched the T332 although after its disastrous 1975 series, Max Stewarts T400 was often competitive in 1976 and 1977. In the Shellsport F5000 series in 1975, Peter Gethin and Pilete's T400 was probably quicker than the best T332s of Guy Edwards and Ian Ashley and in 1976 Keith Holland in a T400 often matched Edward's and David Purley 3.6 March and Chevron cars. The last two new T332c F5000s in 1977 were built for Alan Jones for the 1977 Australian Tasman rounds and Keith Holland Shellsport campaign that year.

During its competition life, the T332 also won the US Formula A/F5000 Championship in 1974 and 1975 driven by British driver Brian Redman, the British Formula 5000 Championship in 1974 driven by Formula One driver Bob Evans and the 1979 Australian Drivers' Championship when driven by South Australian Johnnie Walker who also won the 1979 Australian Grand Prix in his T332. Walker also used a T332 to finish second in the 1975 Australian Drivers' Championship.
