= 1976 Australian Drivers' Championship =

Motor racing competition

Seasons
- ← 1975 1977 →

The 1976 Australian Drivers' Championship was an Australian motor racing competition open to Australian Formula 1 cars and Australian Formula 2 cars. It was authorised by the Confederation of Australian Motor Sport as an Australian National Title with the winner awarded the CAMS Gold Star. The title was the 20th Australian Drivers' Championship.

The championship was won by John Leffler driving a Lola T400.

== Calendar ==
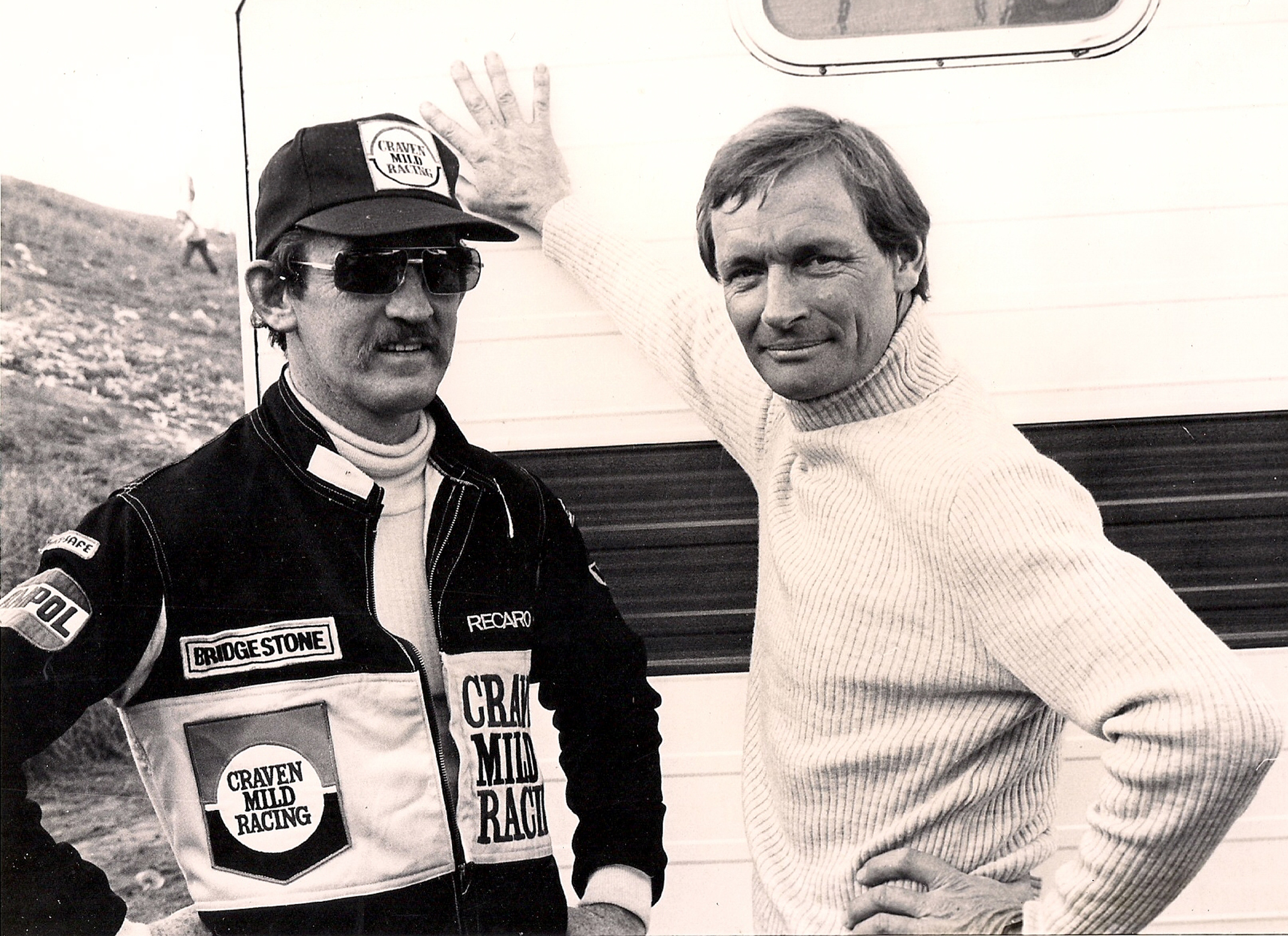
1976 Australian Drivers' Championship winner John Leffler (pictured on the right), in 1978

The championship was contested over a four-round series.

| Round | Round/race name | Circuit | State | Date | Round format | Winner | Car | Report |
|---|---|---|---|---|---|---|---|---|
| 1 | Australian Grand Prix | Sandown Park | Victoria | 12 September | One race | John Goss | Matich A51/53 Repco Holden | Report |
| 2 | Unnamed | Oran Park | New South Wales | 19 September | One race | Max Stewart | Lola T400 Chevrolet | |
| 3 | Unnamed | Calder Raceway | Victoria | 17 October | Two Heats | John McCormack | McLaren M23 Repco-Leyland | |
| 4 | Mirafiori 5000 | Phillip Island | Victoria | 28 November | One race | Alf Costanzo | Lola T332 Chevrolet | |

== Points system ==
Championship points were awarded on a 9–6–4–3–2–1 basis to the first six place-getters at each round. For Round 3 only, round placings were determined by allocating points to the first fourteen place-getters in each heat on a 20–16–13–11–10–9–8–7–6–5–4–3–2–1 basis. Championship points were then awarded on the standard 9–6–4–3–2–1 basis to the top six drivers for that round. Only holders of current and valid full General Competition Licenses issued by CAMS were eligible for the championship.

== Results ==
| Position | Driver | Car | Entrant | San. | Ora. | Cal. | Phi. | Total |
|---|---|---|---|---|---|---|---|---|
| 1 | John Leffler | Lola T400 Chevrolet | Grace Bros Racing | 6 | 4 | 6 | 6 | 22 |
| 2 | Max Stewart | Lola T400 Chevrolet | M Stewart | – | 9 | 3 | – | 12 |
| 3 | John McCormack | McLaren M23 Repco-Leyland | J McCormack; Budget Rent-a-Car | – | – | 9 | 2 | 11 |
| 4 | Bruce Allison | Lola T332 Chevrolet | B Allison; Hobby & Toyland | – | 3 | 4 | 3 | 10 |
| 5 | John Goss | Matich A51/53 Repco Holden | John Goss Racing Pty Ltd | 9 | – | – | – | 9 |
| 5 | Alf Costanzo | Lola T332 Chevrolet | Stock 84 Brandy; A. Costanzo | – | – | – | 9 | 9 |
| 7 | Garrie Cooper | Elfin MR8 Chevrolet | Ansett Team Elfin | – | 2 | 2 | 4 | 8 |
| 8 | Kevin Bartlett | Lola T400 Chevrolet | Shellsport | – | 6 | – | – | 6 |
| 9 | Chris Milton | McLaren M22 Chevrolet | John Martin's / Shellsport | 4 | – | – | – | 4 |
| 10 | Andrew Miedecke | Brabham BT36 Ford | Grace Bros Racing | 3 | – | – | – | 3 |
| 11 | Chris Farrell | Elfin 622 Ford | C. Farrell | – | 1 | – | – | 1 |
| 11 | Gil Cameron | McLaren M10B Chevrolet | VYI's Fashion Sunglasses | – | – | 1 | – | 1 |
| 11 | John Edmonds | Elfin MR5B Repco Holden | Hi-Way Denims; J. Edmonds | – | – | – | 1 | 1 |

Note:

- There were only five classified finishers at the Sandown Park round.
- Vern Schuppan (Elfin MR8 Chevrolet) placed second at the Sandown Park round but was not eligible to score championship points.

== Championship name ==
The championship has been referred to by various names including the 1976 Australian Formula 1 Championship, the 1976 Gold Star Championship, the 20th Australian Formula 1 Drivers Championship for the 1976 C.A.M.S. Gold Star Award and the 1976 Australian Drivers' Championship. The latter term is used by CAMS in historical records and has been used in this article.
