= 1978 Australian Grand Prix =

- Round 2 of the 1978 Australian Drivers' Championship

Race details
- Date: 10 September 1978
- Official name: XLIII Australian Grand Prix
- Location: Sandown International Motor Racing Circuit, Melbourne, Victoria, Australia
- Course: Permanent racing facility
- Course length: 3.100 km (1.926 miles)
- Distance: 49 laps, 148.8 km (92.448 miles)
- Weather: Sunny

Pole position
Driver	(Australia) John McCormack	McLaren-Leyland
- Time: 1'00.9

Fastest lap
Driver	(New Zealand) Graham McRae	McRae-Chevrolet
- Time: 1'01.9

Podium
First	(New Zealand) Graham McRae	McRae-Chevrolet
Second	(Australia) John Briggs	Matich-Repco Holden
Third	(Australia) Peter Edwards	Lola-Chevrolet

The 1978 Australian Grand Prix was a motor race open to cars complying with Australian Formula 1, (commonly referred to as Formula 5000 cars). It was held on 10 September 1978 at the Sandown International Motor Racing Circuit, in Victoria, Australia.

It was the forty third Australian Grand Prix held and it was the Golden Anniversary AGP with the first being run in 1928. It also doubled as Round 2 of the 1978 Australian Drivers' Championship.

== Summary ==
=== Qualifying ===
John McCormack started on pole in his McLaren M23 alongside Kiwi Graham McRae in his own designed and built McRae GM3, complete with a unique clear perspex cockpit cover allowing people to see McRae at work in the car. Before the start McCormack's crew discovered in the warm up that a blown head gasket in qualifying had resulted in damage to the 5.0L Leyland's cylinder heads but had no time to replace it so McCormack started under a cloud. Vern Schuppan qualified his Ansett Team Elfin MR8 3rd with a time equal to that of McRae with the Lola's of Alan Hamilton and Jon Davison rounding out the top 5 qualifiers.

Ian Adams did not practice in his Lola T330, but was permitted to start the race from the rear of the grid.

=== Race ===
McRae won the start and was never headed despite slowing on the start/finish line for confirmation of a 'bad sportsmanship' flag for not slowing enough past Coopers crash on lap 22, and a spin at the Dandenong Road corner (turn 7 on the old circuit) on lap 32. During the time of Cooper's crash alone McRae extended his lead over Jon Davison and Vern Schuppan by more than half the length of the almost 1 km long front straight as others slowed for the yellow flags where McRae did not resulting in the bad sportmanship flag for McRae.

Alfredo Costanzo was the first to retire on lap 5 when he lost 2nd gear in Kevin Bartlett's spare Lola T400B, while McCormack retired his McLaren from 3rd place with head gasket failure on lap 6.

McRae won the 49 lap race by two laps from John Briggs driving an older model Matich A51 Repco-Holden, with Peter Edwards in a Lola T332 finishing 3rd. McRae's fastest race lap of 1:01.9 (average speed of 180.29 km/h or 112 mph) was also the fastest lap of the race.

The race was marred by several crashes, with two drivers taken to hospital. On lap 22 Garrie Cooper broke some ribs and badly broke his leg in a 250 km/h crash at Rothmans Rise on the back straight, completely destroying his self-designed Elfin MR8 in the process. Cooper's simple explanation of the crash was that "something broke" sending him sliding sideways along the old fence that separated the race track from the horse track. Five laps later, his 3rd placed teammate Vern Schuppan had tangled with the ex-Alan Jones Lola T332 of 2nd placed Jon Davison in turn 1 and had to retire with damage, leaving both Ansett Team Elfin cars with heavy damage. The crash also saw Davison retire with his car with terminal damage just moments later at Holden Corner (turn 2). Then with only 3 laps left, Alan Hamilton badly crashed his Lola T430 into the old Dunlop Bridge coming through the high speed causeway onto the main straight. The car crashed into the base of the bridge and was torn in two with Hamilton's body exposed at the front of the car while he was still strapped to his seat (thankfully this time drivers heeded the yellow flags and proceeded slowly through the scene as Hamilton and what was left of his car had bounced back onto the race track). Hamilton was unconscious and was taken to hospital with minor head injuries and some broken bones but went on to make a full recovery.

== Classification ==
=== Qualifying ===
Pos	No	Driver	Car	Entrant	Qual	Gap
1	1	(Australia) John McCormack	McLaren M23 / Leyland 5.0L V8	J McCormack	1:00.9	—
2	2	(New Zealand) Graham McRae	McRae GM3 Chevrolet 5.0L V8	Thomson Motor Auctions	1:01.3	+0.4
3	11	(Australia) Vern Schuppan	Elfin MR8 Chevrolet 5.0L V8	Ansett Team Elfin	1:01.3	+0.4
4	19	(Australia) Alan Hamilton	Lola T430 Chevrolet 5.0L V8	Porsche Cars Australia	1:02.0	+1.1
5	24	(Australia) Jon Davison	Lola T332 Chevrolet 5.0L V8	Ranger Truck Rentals	1:02.3	+1.4
6	10	(Australia) Chris Milton	Lola T332 Chevrolet 5.0L V8	Shellsport	1:03.3	+2.4
7	3	(Australia) Kevin Bartlett	Brabham BT43 Chevrolet 5.0L V8	Thomson Motor Auctions	1:03.5	+2.6
8	40	(Australia) Chas Talbot	Lola T332 Chevrolet 5.0L V8	C Talbot	1:04.0	+3.1
9	15	(Australia) Terry Hook	Lola T332 Chevrolet 5.0L V8	T Hook	1:04.7	+3.8
10	84	(Australia) Alfredo Costanzo	Lola T400B Chevrolet 5.0L V8	Auto Sprint Motors	1:04.8	+3.9
11	33	(Australia) John Briggs	Matich A51 Repco Holden 5.0L V8	John Roberts Motors Pty Ltd	1:04.8	+3.9
12	5	(Australia) Peter Middleton	Elfin MR5 Repco Holden 5.0L V8	P Middleton	1:07.0	+6.1
13	12	(Australia) Garrie Cooper	Elfin MR8 Chevrolet 5.0L V8	Ansett Team Elfin	1:09.1	+8.2
14	21	(Australia) Peter Edwards	Lola T332 Chevrolet 5.0L V8	Shellsport	1:10.2	+9.3
15	98	(Australia) Barry Singleton	Chevron B24 Chevrolet 5.0L V8	Barry Singleton Motors Pty Ltd	1:12.2	+11.3
16	4	(Australia) Gary Dumbrell	McRae GM1 Chevrolet 5.0L V8	Wynne's Friction Proof Racing	1:12.7	+11.8
17	34	(Australia) Colin Trengrove	Lola T330 Chevrolet 5.0L V8	Trengrove Racing Cars	1:22.7	+21.8
18	14	(Australia) Bronwyn Taylor	Matich A50 Repco Holden 5.0L V8	Bronwyn Taylor	1:39.3	+38.4
19	18	(Australia) Ian Adams	Lola T330 Chevrolet 5.0L V8	I Adams	DNP	

=== Race ===
Pos	No	Driver	Car	Entrant	Laps	Time
1	2	(New Zealand) Graham McRae	McRae GM3 Chevrolet 5.0L V8	Thomson Motor Auctions	49	52m 45.2s
2	33	(Australia) John Briggs	Matich A51 Repco Holden 5.0L V8	John Roberts Motors Pty Ltd	47	
3	21	(Australia) Peter Edwards	Lola T332 Chevrolet 5.0L V8	Shellsport	45	
4	5	(Australia) Peter Middleton	Elfin MR5 Repco Holden 5.0L V8	P Middleton	43	
5	3	(Australia) Kevin Bartlett	Brabham BT43 Chevrolet 5.0L V8	Thomson Motor Auctions	42	
6	18	(Australia) Ian Adams	Lola T330 Chevrolet 5.0L V8	I Adams	39	
7	15	(Australia) Terry Hook	Lola T332 Chevrolet 5.0L V8	T Hook	37	
Ret	19	(Australia) Alan Hamilton	Lola T430 Chevrolet 5.0L V8	Porsche Cars Australia	46	Accident
Ret	98	(Australia) Barry Singleton	Chevron B24 Chevrolet 5.0L V8	Barry Singleton Motors Pty Ltd		
Ret	24	(Australia) Jon Davison	Lola T332 Chevrolet 5.0L V8	Ranger Truck Rentals	27	Accident
Ret	11	(Australia) Vern Schuppan	Elfin MR8 Chevrolet 5.0L V8	Ansett Team Elfin	27	Accident
Ret	12	(Australia) Garrie Cooper	Elfin MR8 Chevrolet 5.0L V8	Ansett Team Elfin	22	Accident
Ret	10	(Australia) Chris Milton	Lola T332 Chevrolet 5.0L V8	Shellsport	18	
Ret	40	(Australia) Chas Talbot	Lola T332 Chevrolet 5.0L V8	C Talbot		
Ret	4	(Australia) Gary Dumbrell	McRae GM1 Chevrolet 5.0L V8	Wynne's Friction Proof Racing		
Ret	1	(Australia) John McCormack	McLaren M23 Leyland 5.0L V8	J McCormack	6	Head Gasket
Ret	84	(Australia) Alfredo Costanzo	Lola T400B Chevrolet 5.0L V8	Auto Sprint Motors	5	Gearbox
DNS	34	(Australia) Colin Trengrove	Lola T330 Chevrolet 5.0L V8	Trengrove Racing Cars		
DNS	14	(Australia) Bronwyn Taylor	Matich A50 Repco Holden 5.0L V8	B Taylor		

== Notes ==
- Pole position: John McCormack - 1:00.9
- Fastest lap: Graham McRae - 1:01.9
- Winner's average speed: 172.76 km/h (107.35 mph)

== Post Race Exhibition ==
After the race, McRae was awarded the Lex Davison Trophy for winning from five time World Champion Juan Manuel Fangio, stating in his short victory speech that he never thought he would ever get to meet Mr Fangio and that he believed it was a greater honour than having won his 3rd AGP. Following this Fangio, Australia's three time world champion, Jack Brabham, Bob Jane driving a Maserati, and former racer turned Holden dealer Bill Patterson driving a Cooper, had a spirited three lap demonstration/race with Fangio and Brabham clearing out and swapping the lead many times. Fangio was driving a Mercedes-Benz W196 that he raced in 1954 and 1955, while Brabham (not yet Sir Jack) drove the Repco-Brabham V8 powered Brabham BT19 in which he won the 1966 World Championship of Drivers. Brabham 'won' the demonstration, just ahead of Fangio, with Patterson and Jane some distance behind in 3rd and 4th.

The 67-year-old Fangio had been invited to the meeting by race organiser's to demonstrate his Mercedes. However the great man stated that he would not demonstrate his World Championship winning Mercedes, he was going to race it. Fangio also intended to drive in a T-shirt like he had in his Formula One days, but had to conform to safety regulations about uncovered body parts and wore a full set of white overalls, though he was permitted to use his old goggles and Herbie Johnson racing helmet.

Despite not having raced competitively for 20 years, Juan Manuel Fangio was still the holder of a full FIA Super Licence which he would still hold at the time of his death in 1995.

The fastest lap of the demonstration was a 1:21.6 by Jack Brabham, almost 20 seconds slower than McRae's fastest lap for the Grand Prix. Showing that it was more a demonstration than a race, Jack's lap was some 17 seconds slower than the old Tasman Series races at the circuit, with the series lap record being a 1:04.500 by Chris Amon in a Ferrari set in 1968.

Preceded by 1977 Australian Grand Prix	Australian Grand Prix; 1978	Succeeded by 1979 Australian Grand Prix
