= 1976 Rothmans International Series =

Seasons
- ← none 1977 →

The 1976 Rothmans International Series was an Australian motor racing competition open to single seater racing cars complying with Australian Formula 1. The series, which was the first Rothmans International Series, was won by Vern Schuppan, driving a Lola T332 Chevrolet.

== Schedule ==
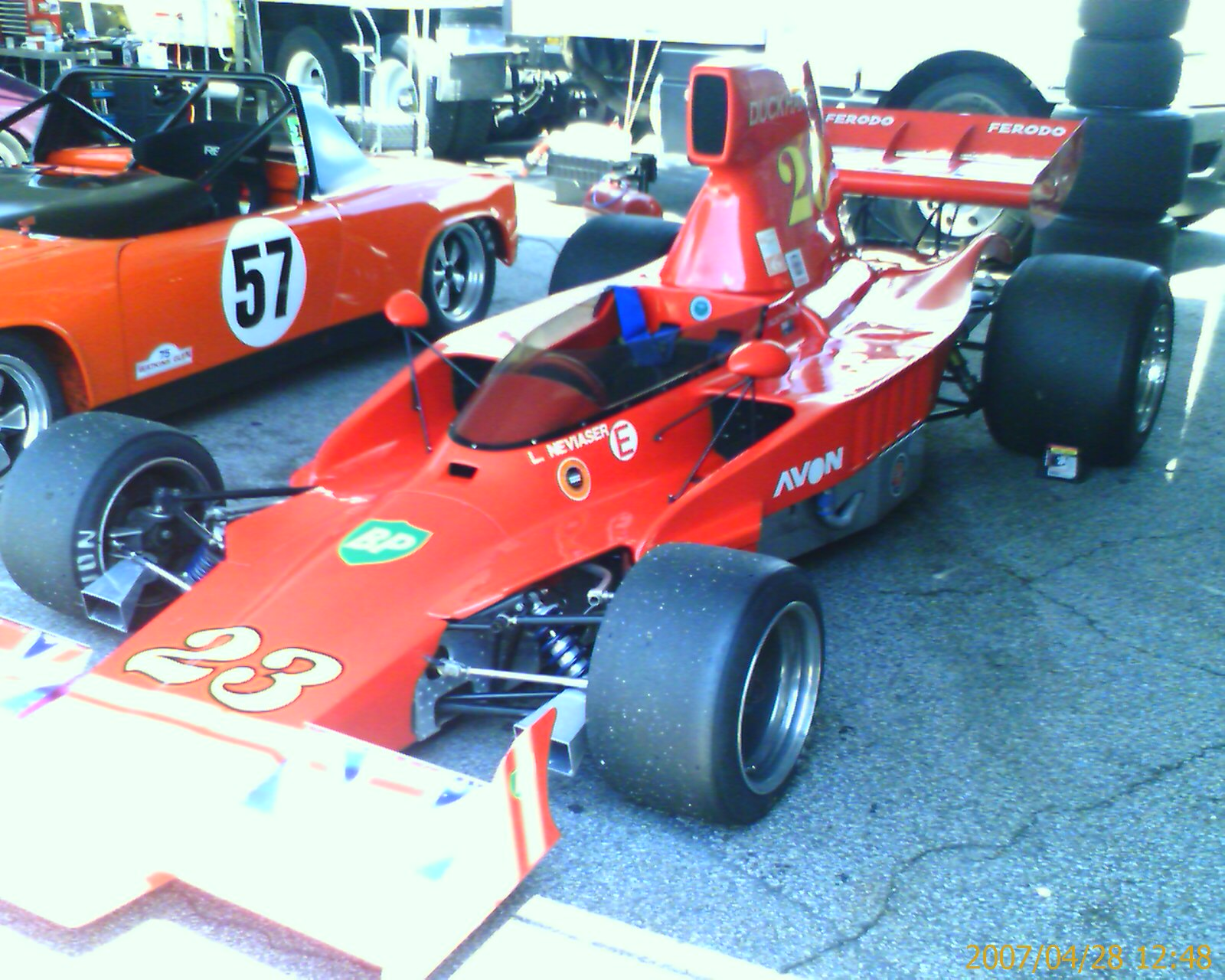
Vern Schuppan won the series driving a Lola T332 similar to the example pictured

The 1976 Rothmans International Series was contested over four rounds with one race per round.

| Round | Name | Circuit | Date | Winning driver | Car |
| 1 | Oran Park 100 | Oran Park | 1 February | Vern Schuppan | Lola T332 Chevrolet |
| 2 | N/A | Adelaide International Raceway | 8 February | Ken Smith | Lola T330 Chevrolet |
| 3 | Sandown Park Cup | Sandown Park | 15 February | John Cannon | March 73A/751 Chevrolet |
| 4 | Surfers Paradise 100 | Surfers Paradise | 29 February | Race cancelled | |

The final round was postponed for one week due to heavy rain and flooding and the rescheduled race was cancelled after qualifying due to further rain.

== Points system ==
Series points were awarded on a 9-6-4-3-2-1 basis for the first six places at each round.

== Series results ==
| Position | Driver | Car | Entrant | Ora | Ade | San | Sur | Total |
| 1 | (Australia) Vern Schuppan | Lola T332 Chevrolet | Theodore Racing | 9 | 6 | 6 | - | 21 |
| 2 | (New Zealand) Ken Smith | Lola T330 Chevrolet | La Valise Racing | 4 | 9 | 3 | - | 16 |
| 3 | (Canada) John Cannon | March 73A/751 Chevrolet | Anglo American Racing | - | - | 9 | - | 9 |
| 4 | (Australia) Kevin Bartlett | Lola T400 Chevrolet | K Bartlett Shell Sport | 6 | 2 | - | - | 8 |
| 5 | (Australia) John Goss | Matich A51 Repco Holden | John Goss Racing Pty Ltd | 2 | - | 4 | - | 6 |
| 6 | (Australia) John Leffler | Lola T400 Chevrolet | Grace Bros Race Team | - | 4 | - | - | 4 |
| 7 | (Australia) Terry Hook | Lola T332 Chevrolet | Sharp Corporation of Australia | 3 | - | - | - | 3 |
| = | (Australia) Chris Milton | McLaren M18/22 Chevrolet | John Martins Shell Sport | - | 3 | - | - | 3 |
| 9 | (Australia) Jon Davison | Matich A50 Repco Holden | Southern Comfort Racing Team | - | - | 2 | - | 2 |
| 10 | (United Kingdom) David Purley | Lola T330 Chevrolet | Richard Oaten Racing | 1 | - | - | - | 1 |
| = | (Australia) John McCormack | Elfin MR6 Repco Holden | Ansett Team Elfin | - | 1 | - | - | 1 |
| = | (Australia) Gil Cameron | McLaren M10B Chevrolet | V.Y.I.'s Sunglasses | - | - | 1 | - | 1 |
