= 1977 Australian Drivers' Championship =

Motor racing competition

Seasons
- ← 1976 1978 →

The 1977 Australian Drivers' Championship was an Australian motor racing competition for racing cars complying with Australian Formula 1 or with Australian Formula 2. It was the 21st Australian Drivers' Championship to be awarded by the Confederation of Australian Motor Sport.

The championship winner, John McCormack, was awarded the 1977 CAMS Gold Star.

== Calendar ==
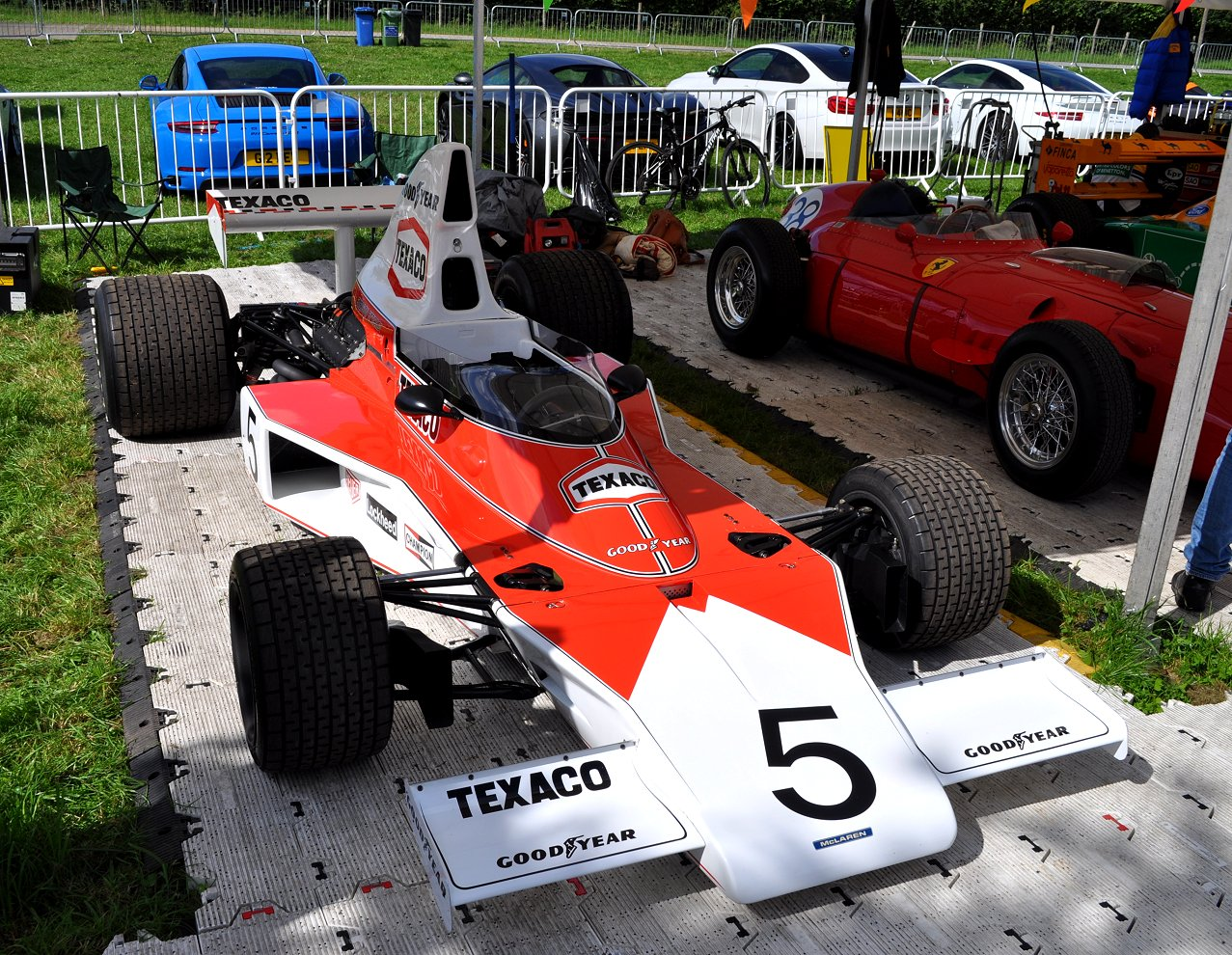
John McCormack won the championship driving a McLaren M23, similar to the example pictured above, but fitted with a Repco-Leyland V8 engine rather than a Ford Cosworth DFV.

The championship was contested over a four-round series.

Round	Name	Circuit	Date	Format	Round winner	Car
1	Glyn Scott Memorial Trophy	Surfers Paradise	28 August	One race	John McCormack	McLaren M23 Repco-Leyland
2	Rothmans 10,000	Sandown Park	11 September	One race	Alfredo Costanzo	Lola T332 Chevrolet
3		Calder	16 October	Two heats	Jon Davison	Lola T332 Chevrolet
4		Phillip Island	13 November	One race	John Leffler	Lola T400 Chevrolet

== Points system ==
Championship points were awarded on a 9-6-4-3-2-1 basis to the first six place-getters at each round.

Where a round was contested over two heats, points were allocated on a 20-16-13-11-10-9-8-7-6-5-4-3-2-1 basis to the first 14 place-getters in each heat. The six drivers attaining the highest aggregate from both heats were then awarded the championship points for that round. Where more than one driver attained the same total, the relevant placing was awarded to the driver who was higher placed in the last heat.

== Championship standings ==
Position	Driver	No.	Car	Entrant	Sur.	San.	Cal.	Phi.	Total
1	John McCormack	77	McLaren M23 Repco-Leyland	Budget F1 Team	9	-	6	4	19
2	John Leffler	1	Lola T400 Chevrolet	Grace Bros. Racing	4	3	-	9	16
3	Alan Hamilton	9	Lola T430 Chevrolet	Alan Hamilton	-	6	3	6	15
4	Alfredo Costanzo	84	Lola T332 Chevrolet	Auto Sprint Motors	-	9	4	-	13
5	Jon Davison	4	Lola T332 Chevrolet	Jon Davison	-	-	9	-	9
6	Kevin Bartlett	5	Lola T400 Chevrolet	Kevin Bartlett	3	4	-	1	8
7	Garrie Cooper	12	Elfin MR8 Chevrolet	Ansett Team Elfin	6	-	-	-	6
=	Peter Edwards	11	Lola T332 Chevrolet	P.J. Edwards	-	2	1	3	6
9	Terry Hook	15	Lola T332 Chevrolet	Terry Hook	2	-	2	-	4
10	Chas Talbot	17 & 20	Begg FM5 Chevrolet	Chas Talbot	1	1	-	-	2
=	Graeme Smith		Birrana 274 Ford	Graeme Smith Trucks	-	-	-	2	2

== Championship name ==
Sources vary as to the actual name of the championship.

- The 1977 CAMS Manual of Motor Sport refers to the Australian Formula 1 Championship - Gold Star Award, stating that "The phrase "Australian Champion Driver" shall be reserved exclusively for the winner of the CAMS Gold Star".
- Australian Competition Yearbook, 1978 Edition uses the term Australian Drivers' Championship.
- Historical records published by CAMS use the term Australian Drivers' Championship.
