= 1967 Australian Tourist Trophy =

The 1967 Australian Tourist Trophy was a motor race staged at the Surfers Paradise International Motor Circuit in Queensland, Australia on 21 May 1967. The race was open to Group A Sports Cars and was recognized by the Confederation of Australian Motor Sport as an Australian national title race. It was the eleventh Australian Tourist Trophy. The race was won by Frank Matich driving a Matich SR3 Oldsmobile.

== Results ==
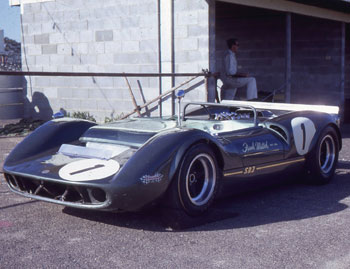
Frank Matich won the 1967 Australian Tourist Trophy driving a Matich SR3. The example above is pictured in 1968.

Position	Driver	No.	Car	Entrant	Class	Class pos.
1	Frank Matich	1	Matich SR3 Oldsmobile	Frank Matich Pty. Ltd.	Over 2000cc	1
2	Allan Hamilton	9	Porsche 906 Spyder	Porsche Distributors Pty. Ltd.	1500-2000cc	1
3	Glyn Scott	20	Lotus 23B	Glyn Scott Motors	1500-2000cc	2
4	Bill Gates	50	Lotus Elan	G.P. Cars	1500-2000cc	3
5	Bob Beasley	40	Lotus Elan	Phipps Developments	1500-2000cc	4
6	Max Brunninghausen	30	Alfa Romeo Giulia TZ	Ian Hindmarsh Motors	1500-2000cc	5
?	Peter Lefrancke	46	Centaur Mk1b	Peter Lefrancke	1100-1500cc	1
?	Barry Lock	87	Lotus Super 7	Barry Lock	1100-1500cc	2
?	John French	10	Mini	BMC (Aust) Pty. Ltd.	Up to 1100cc	1
?	Leigh Bayley	16	Austin-Healey Sprite	Barry Broomhall Motors	Up to 1100cc	2
?	Tim Harlock	42	Centaur	T.D.J. Harlock	Up to 1100cc	3
?	Anne Thompson	21	Lotus 15	Glyn Scott Motors	1100-1500cc	?
?	Harry Cape	22	Lotus Elan	Harry Cape	1500-2000cc	?
DNF	Barry Broomhall	56	Austin-Healey Sprite	Barry Broomhall Motors	Up to 1100cc	-
DNS	John Scott-Davies	5	Lola T70	John Scott-Davies	Over 2000cc	-
DNS	Brian Foley	8	Broadspeed GTS	Foley Motors	1100-1500cc	-

=== Race statistics ===
- Race distance : 40 laps, 80 miles
- The race commenced with a Le Mans start
- Number of starters: 14
- Number of finishers: Not yet ascertained
- Winner's race time: 55:16.9
- Winner's race average speed: 87.2 mph
- Fastest lap: Frank Matich (Matich SR3): 1:30.0 (98.63 mph): Lap record for Sports Cars
