= 1977 Australian Grand Prix =

- Round 1 of the 1977 Rothmans International Series

Race details
- Date: 6 February 1977
- Official name: XLII Australian Grand Prix
- Location: Oran Park Raceway, Sydney
- Course: Permanent racing facility
- Course length: 2.620 km (1.628 miles)
- Distance: 58 laps, 151.96 km (94.424 miles)
- Weather: Sunny

Pole position
Driver	(Australia) Warwick Brown	Lola-Chevrolet
- Time: 1'05.7

Fastest lap
Driver	(Australia) Alan Jones	Lola-Chevrolet
- Time: 1'06.4

Podium
First	(Australia) Warwick Brown	Lola-Chevrolet
Second	(United Kingdom) Peter Gethin	Chevron-Chevrolet
Third	(Australia) John Goss	Matich-Repco Holden

The 1977 Australian Grand Prix was a motor race held at Oran Park International Raceway in Sydney, New South Wales, Australia on 6 February 1977. It was the forty second Australian Grand Prix and also the first round of the 1977 Rothmans International Series. The race was open to Australian Formula 1 cars and Australian Formula 2 cars.

The race was won by Warwick Brown (Lola T430), his first and only Australian Grand Prix victory. Alan Jones (Lola T332) actually finished his 58th and final lap 40 seconds ahead of Brown, however officials penalised Jones 60 seconds for jumping the start and he was officially classified in 4th place.

== Classification ==
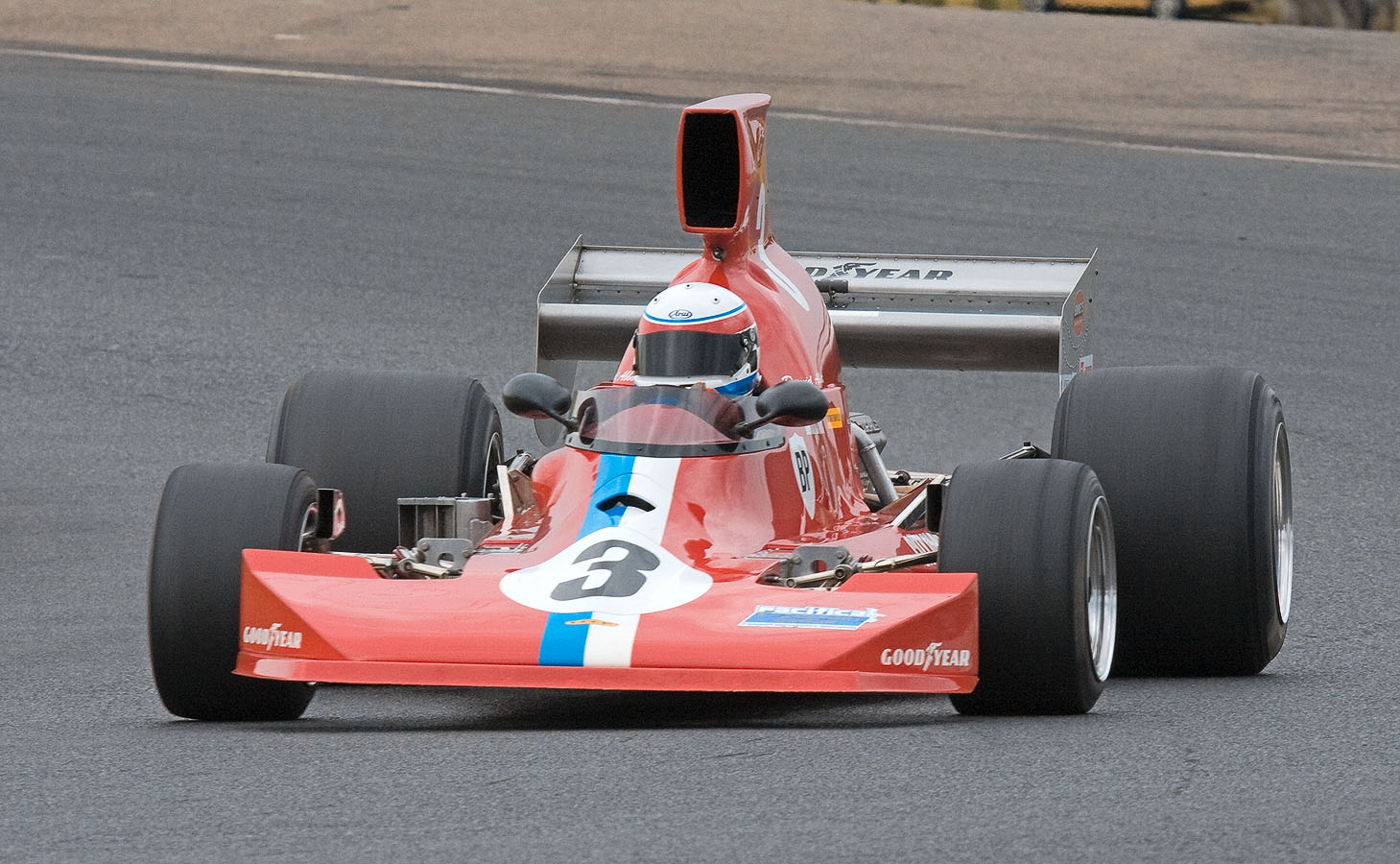
Warwick Brown won the race driving this Lola T430 (pictured in 2008)

Results as follows:

== Qualifying ==
Pos	No	Driver	Car / engine	Qual	Gap
1	3	(Australia) Warwick Brown	Lola T430 / Chevrolet 5.0L V8	1:05.7	—
2	6	(Australia) Alan Jones	Lola T332 / Chevrolet 5.0L V8	1:06.0	+0.3
3	4	(United Kingdom) Peter Gethin	Chevron B24 / Chevrolet 5.0L V8	1:06.1	+0.4
4	2	(Australia) John Goss	Matich A53 / Repco Holden 5.0L V8	1:06.1	+0.4
5	16	(Australia) Max Stewart	Lola T400 / Chevrolet 5.0L V8	1:06.9	+1.2
6	5	(Australia) Kevin Bartlett	Lola T332 / Chevrolet 5.0L V8	1:07.3	+1.6
7	1	(Australia) Vern Schuppan	Elfin MR8 / Chevrolet 5.0L V8	1:07.3	+1.6
8	84	(Australia) Alfredo Costanzo	Lola T332 / Chevrolet 5.0L V8	1:07.7	+2.0
9	12	(Australia) Garrie Cooper	Elfin MR8 / Chevrolet 5.0L V8	1:08.0	+2.3
10	15	(Australia) Terry Hook	Lola T332 / Chevrolet 5.0L V8	1:09.8	+4.1
11	17	(Australia) Ken Shirvington	Lola T400 / Chevrolet 5.0L V8	1:10.4	+4.7
12	10	(Australia) Chris Milton	Gardos OR2 / Chevrolet 5.0L V8	1:10.9	+5.2
13	14	(Australia) Jon Davison	Matich A51 / Repco Holden 5.0L V8	1:11.1	+5.4
14	62	(Australia) Dave Powell	Matich A51 / Repco Holden 5.0L V8	1:11.3	+5.6
15	19	(Australia) John Edmonds	Elfin MR5B / Repco Holden 5.0L V8	1:11.7	+6.0
16	8	(New Zealand) Graeme Lawrence	Lola T332 / Chevrolet 5.0L V8	DNP	
17	77	(Australia) John McCormack	McLaren M23 / Leyland 5.0L V8	DNP	
–	7	(Australia) John Leffler	Lola T400 / Chevrolet 5.0L V8	DNP	engine

== Race ==
Pos	No.	Driver	Car / engine	Entrant	Laps	Time
1	3	(Australia) Warwick Brown	Lola T430 / Chevrolet 5.0L V8	Racing Team VDS	58	1h 05m 31.9s
2	4	(United Kingdom) Peter Gethin	Chevron B24 / Chevrolet 5.0L V8	Racing Team VDS	58	1h 05m 46.7s
3	2	(Australia) John Goss	Matich A53 / Repco Holden 5.0L V8	John Goss Racing	58	1h 05m 49.2s
4	6	(Australia) Alan Jones	Lola T332 / Chevrolet 5.0L V8	Theodore Racing (Hong Kong) / Bill Patterson Motors	58	1h 05m 51.9s
5	1	(Australia) Vern Schuppan	Elfin MR8 / Chevrolet 5.0L V8	Ansett Team Elfin	57	
6	12	(Australia) Garrie Cooper	Elfin MR8 / Chevrolet 5.0L V8	Ansett Team Elfin	56	
7	15	(Australia) Terry Hook	Lola T332 / Chevrolet 5.0L V8	Terry Hook Racing	54	
8	10	(Australia) Chris Milton	Gardos OR2 / Chevrolet 5.0L V8	C & C Racing	52	
9	14	(Australia) Jon Davison	Matich A51 / Repco Holden 5.0L V8	J. Davison	52	
10	19	(Australia) John Edmonds	Elfin MR5B / Repco Holden 5.0L V8	J. Edmonds	48	
11	5	(Australia) Kevin Bartlett	Lola T332 / Chevrolet 5.0L V8	Magnum Wheels	45	
Ret	77	(Australia) John McCormack	McLaren M23 / Leyland 5.0L V8	Budget Motor Racing Team	42	blown engine
Ret	8	(New Zealand) Graeme Lawrence	Lola T332 / Chevrolet 5.0L V8		18	broken engine pushrod
Ret	62	(Australia) Dave Powell	Matich A51 / Repco Holden 5.0L V8	D. Powell	17	overheating
Ret	84	(Australia) Alfredo Costanzo	Lola T332 / Chevrolet 5.0L V8	Stock 84	8	broken drive shaft
DNS	16	(Australia) Max Stewart	Lola T400 / Chevrolet 5.0L V8	M. Stewart		dropped valve
DNS	17	(Australia) Ken Shirvington	Lola T400 / Chevrolet 5.0L V8	K. Shirvington		dropped valve
DNS	7	(Australia) John Leffler	Lola T400 / Chevrolet 5.0L V8	Grace Bros. Racing Team	–	engine

== Notes ==
- Pole Position: Warwick Brown – 1:05.7
- Fastest Lap: Alan Jones – 1:06.4
- Average speed of winning car: 138.6 km/h
- Alan Jones was penalised 60 seconds for jumping the start

Preceded by 1976 Australian Grand Prix	Australian Grand Prix; 1977	Succeeded by 1978 Australian Grand Prix
