= 1968 Australian Tourist Trophy =

Layout of the Mallala Race Circuit (1964-present)

The 1968 Australian Tourist Trophy was a motor race staged at the Mallala Race Circuit in South Australia, Australia on 29 January 1968. The race was open to Group A Sports Cars and was recognized by the Confederation of Australian Motor Sport as an Australian national title race. It was the twelfth Australian Tourist Trophy.

The race was won by Frank Matich driving a Matich SR3 Repco-Brabham. It was his fourth Australian Tourist Trophy victory.

== Results ==
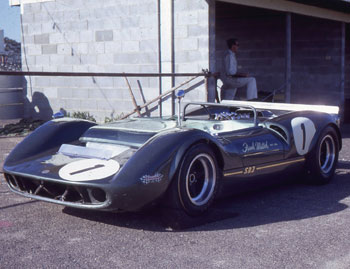
Frank Matich won the 1968 Australian Tourist Trophy driving a Matich SR3. The car is pictured at Surfers Paradise International Raceway in August 1968

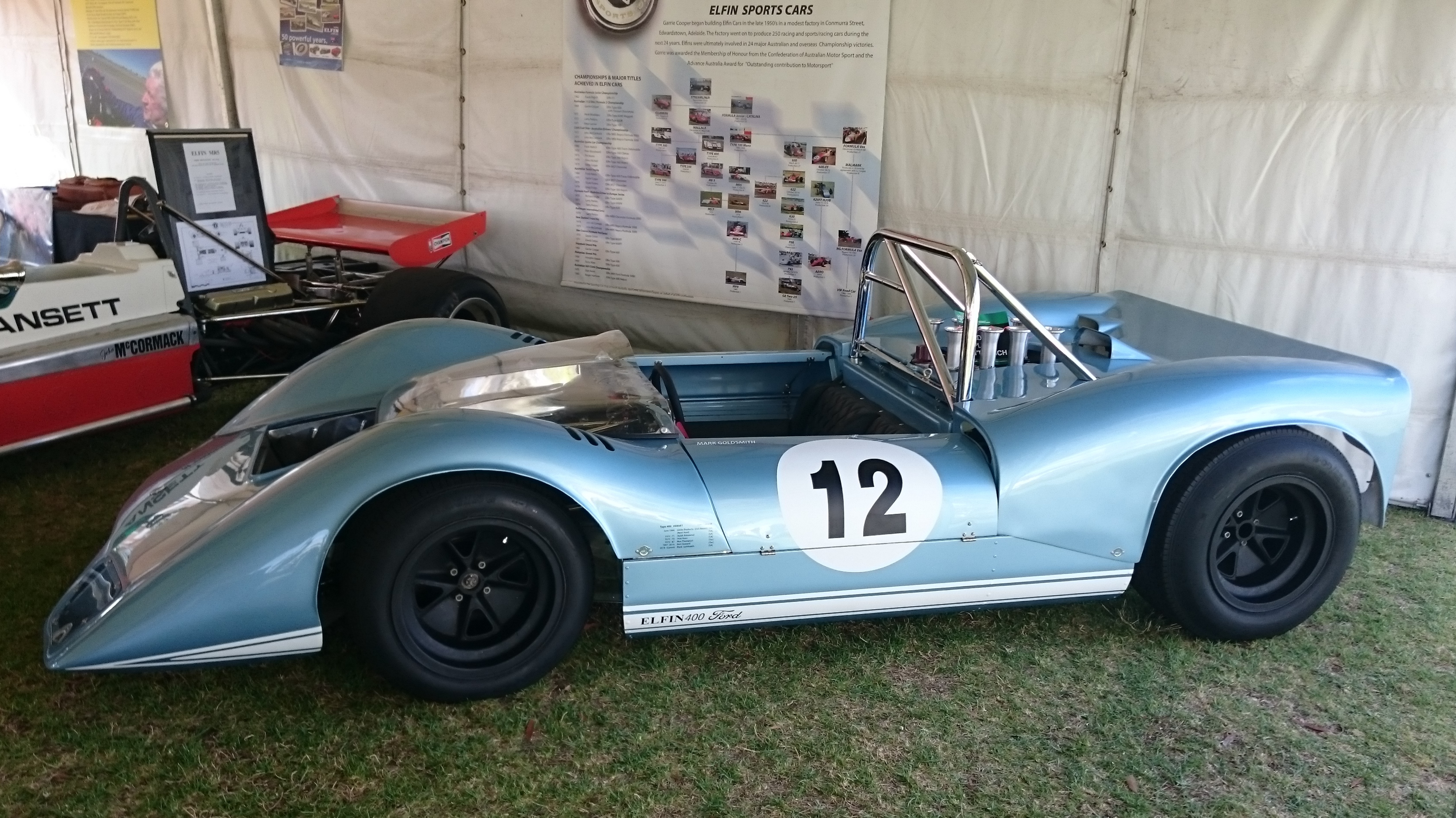
The Elfin 400 in which Noel Hurd placed fifth in the race. The car is pictured in 2017

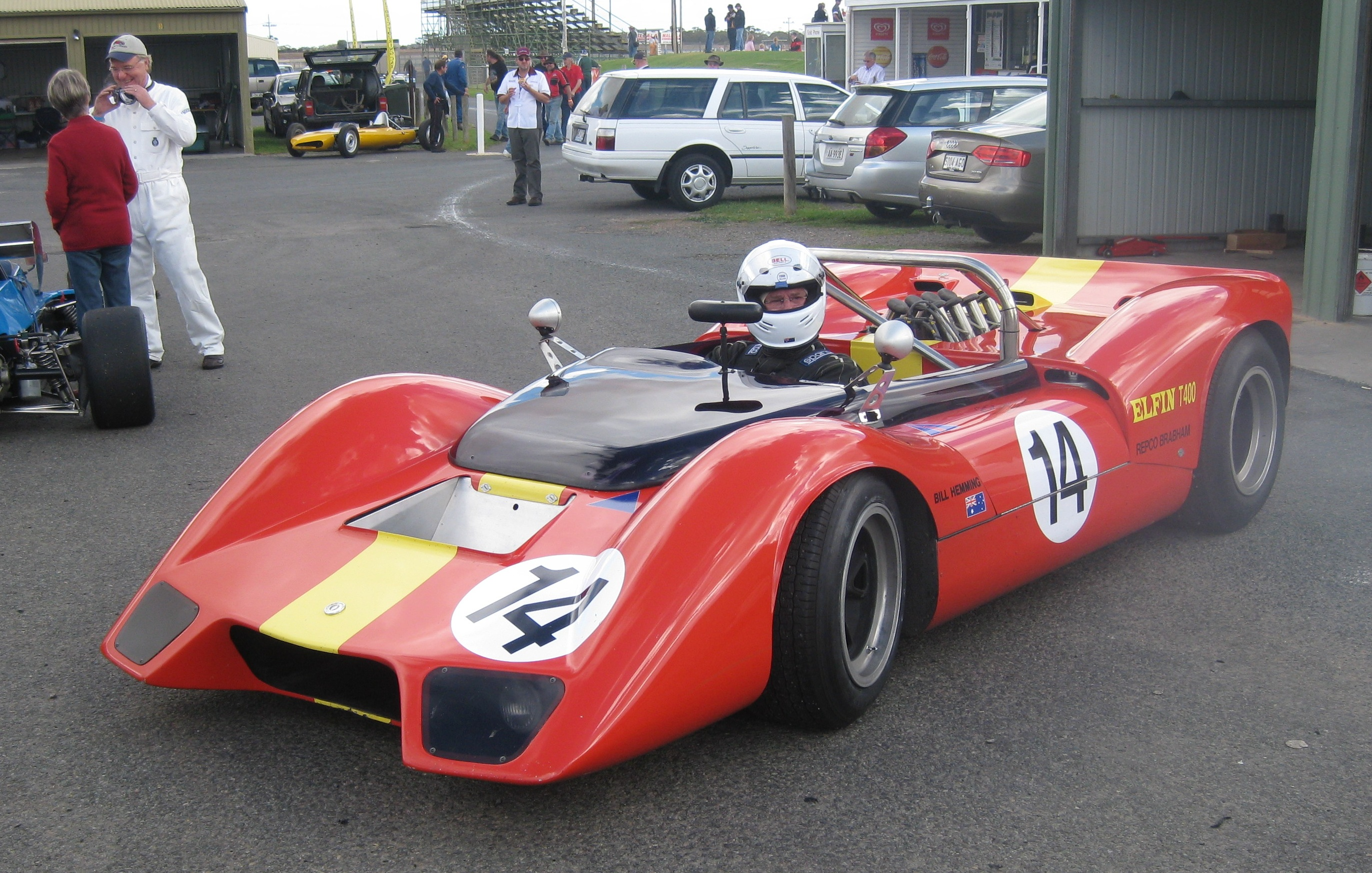
Ian Cook drove this Elfin 400, retiring after 23 laps. The car is pictured at Mallala in 2011 in its Bob Jane Racing Team colours

Position	Driver	No.	Car	Entrant	Class pos.	Class	Laps
1	Frank Matich	1	Matich SR3 Repco-Brabham RB620	Frank Matich Pty. Ltd.	1	Over 3000 cc	47
2	Geoff Vercoe	34	Cicada Ford	Trengove & Vercoe	1	1101 - 1500 cc	44
3	Ralph Boord	60	Olympus Ford	D. Smith & Sons	2	1101 - 1500 cc	41
4	Granton Harrison	52	Elfin Clubman	G. Harrison	1	1500 - 2000 cc	40
5	Noel Hurd	12	Elfin 400 Globe Ford	Globe Products	2	Over 3000 cc	38
6	Gary Chapman	79	Honda S800	Dalton Honda Motors	1	Up to 1100 cc	38
7	G. Mobbs	102	Elfin Clubman	G. Mobbs	2	Up to 1100 cc	37
8	G. Evans	69	MGA s/c	MG Racing Team	2	1500 - 2000 cc	32
9	Charlie Tuckey	61	Nova III	Aunger Racing	3	Up to 1100 cc	20
DNF	Malcolm Ramsay	26	Elfin 300 Ford	Gilbert Motor Bodies	-	1101 - 1500 cc	25
DNF	Ian Cook	8	Elfin 400 Repco RB620	Bob Jane Racing Team	-	Over 3000 cc	23

=== Race statistics ===
- Race distance: 47 laps, 75 miles
- Pole position: Frank Matich, 1:14.5
- Number of starters: 11
- Winner's race time: 64:37.3
- Fastest lap: 1:16.5, Frank Matich, (Matich SR3) - lap record for Sports Cars
