= 1976 Australian Grand Prix =

- Round 1 of the 1976 Australian Drivers' Championship

Race details
- Date: 12 September 1976
- Official name: XLI Australian Grand Prix
- Location: Sandown International Motor Racing Circuit, Melbourne, Victoria
- Course: Permanent racing facility
- Course length: 3.100 km (1.926 miles)
- Distance: 47 laps, 145.70 km (90.522 miles)
- Weather: Sunny

Pole position
Driver	(Australia) Max Stewart	Lola-Chevrolet
- Time: 1'01.5

Fastest lap
Driver	(Australia) John Goss (Australia) Vern Schuppan	Matich-Repco Holden; Elfin-Chevrolet
- Time: 1'01.1

Podium
First	(Australia) John Goss	Matich-Repco Holden
Second	(Australia) Vern Schuppan	Elfin-Chevrolet
Third	(Australia) John Leffler	Lola-Chevrolet

The 1976 Australian Grand Prix was a motor race held at the Sandown International Motor Racing Circuit in Victoria, Australia on 12 September 1976. It was open to racing cars complying with either Australian Formula 1 or Australian Formula 2.

The race was the forty first Australian Grand Prix and doubled as Round 1 of the 1976 Australian Drivers' Championship. John Goss won the race driving a Matich A53 Repco-Holden, and in doing so became the only driver to win both of Australia's highest profile motor races, the Australian Grand Prix and the Bathurst 1000. Goss won the 47 lap race by just half a second from Australian international Vern Schuppan who was driving an Elfin MR8 Chevrolet entered by Ansett Team Elfin. Finishing third, over a lap behind, was John Leffler driving a Lola T400 Chevrolet.

== Qualifying results ==
Pos.	No.	Driver	Car	Entrant	Time	Gap
1	16	(Australia) Max Stewart	Lola T400 / Chevrolet 5.0L V8	M Stewart	1:01.5	—
2	12	(Australia) Vern Schuppan	Elfin MR8 / Chevrolet 5.0L V8	Ansett Team Elfin	1:02.5	+1.0
3	2	(Australia) John Goss	Matich A53 / Repco Holden 5.0L V8	John Goss Racing Pty Ltd	1:04.1	+2.6
4	4	(Australia) Jon Davison	Matich A51 / Repco Holden 5.0L V8	Jon Davison Southern Comfort Racing	1:06.1	+4.6
5	10	(Australia) Chris Milton	McLaren M22 / Chevrolet 5.0L V8	John Martin's / Shell Sport	1:06.5	+5.0
6	62	(Australia) Bruce Allison	Lola T332 / Chevrolet 5.0L V8	B Allison	1:07.1	+5.6
7	15	(Australia) Terry Hook	Lola T332 / Chevrolet 5.0L V8	Terry Hook Racing	1:08.1	+6.6
8	68	(Australia) John Edmonds	Elfin MR5B / Repco Holden 5.0L V8	J Edmonds	1:08.5	+7.0
9	6	(Australia) Ken Shirvington	Lola T400 / Chevrolet 5.0L V8	K Shirvington	1:09.1	+7.6
10	23	(Australia) Steven Fraser	Cicada / Ford 5.0L V8	SH & DG Fraser	1:12.9	+11.4
11	39	(Australia) Gil Cameron	McLaren M10B / Chevrolet 5.0L V8	VYI's Sunglasses	1:13.3	+11.8
12	5	(Australia) Kevin Bartlett	Lola T400 / Chevrolet 5.0L V8	Shellsport K Bartlett	1:16.7	+15.2
13	7	(Australia) John Leffler	Lola T400 / Chevrolet 5.0L V8	Grace Bros Racing	1:34.9	+33.4
14	20	(Australia) Andrew Miedecke	Brabham BT36 / Ford 1.6L I4	Grace Bros Racing	1:08.5	+7.0
15	83	(Australia) Peter Larner	Elfin 700 / England 1.6L I4	P Larner	1:08.6	+7.1
16	33	(Australia) Mike Stack	Cheetah Mk6 / Ford 1.6L I4	M Stack	1:11.4	+9.9
17	17	(Australia) John Millard	Brabham BT36 / Ford 1.6L I4	Chrystal Millard	DNP	

== Race results ==
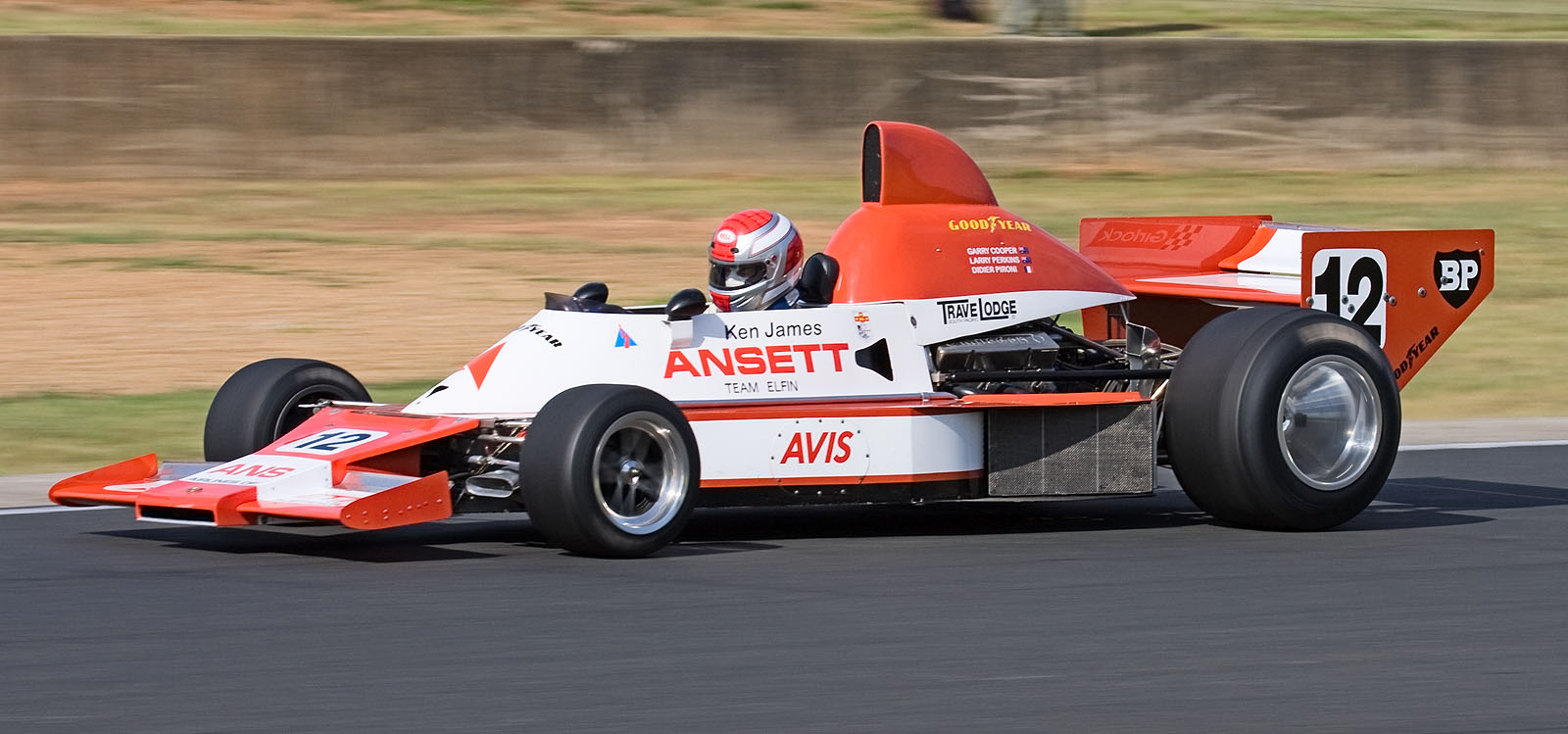
Vern Schuppan placed second in the race driving an Elfin MR8, similar to that pictured above

Pos.	No.	Driver	Car	Entrant	Laps	Time
1	2	(Australia) John Goss	Matich A53 / Repco Holden 5.0L V8	John Goss Racing Pty Ltd	47	48m 41.4s
2	12	(Australia) Vern Schuppan	Elfin MR8 / Chevrolet 5.0L V8	Ansett Team Elfin	47	48m 41.9s
3	7	(Australia) John Leffler	Lola T400 / Chevrolet 5.0L V8	Grace Bros Racing	46	
4	10	(Australia) Chris Milton	McLaren M22 / Chevrolet 5.0L V8	John Martin's / Shell Sport	39	
5	20	(Australia) Andrew Miedecke	Brabham BT36 / Ford 1.6L 4cyl	Grace Bros Racing	37	
Ret	5	(Australia) Kevin Bartlett	Lola T400 / Chevrolet 5.0L V8	Shellsport K Bartlett	33	engine
Ret	23	(Australia) Steven Fraser	Cicada / Ford 5.0L V8	SH & DG Fraser	27	
Ret	16	(Australia) Max Stewart	Lola T400 / Chevrolet 5.0L V8	M Stewart	26	engine
Ret	4	(Australia) Jon Davison	Matich A51 / Repco Holden 5.0L V8	Jon Davison Southern Comfort Racing	19	engine
Ret	83	(Australia) Peter Larner	Elfin 700 / England 1.6L 4cyl	P Larner	17	crash
Ret	15	(Australia) Terry Hook	Lola T332 / Chevrolet 5.0L V8	Terry Hook Racing	12	engine
Ret	39	(Australia) Gil Cameron	McLaren M10B / Chevrolet 5.0L V8	VYI's Fashion Sunglasses	8	engine
Ret	6	(Australia) Ken Shirvington	Lola T400 / Chevrolet 5.0L V8	K Shirvington	1	crash
Ret	62	(Australia) Bruce Allison	Lola T332 / Chevrolet 5.0L V8	B Allison	1	stuck throttle / crash
Ret	68	(Australia) John Edmonds	Elfin MR5B / Repco Holden 5.0L V8	J Edmonds	0	clutch
DNS	33	(Australia) Mike Stack	Cheetah Mk6 / Ford 1.6L 4cyl	M Stack		
DNS	17	(Australia) John Millard	Brabham BT36 / Ford 1.6L 4cyl	Chrystal Millard		

Preceded by 1975 Australian Grand Prix	Australian Grand Prix; 1976	Succeeded by 1977 Australian Grand Prix
