= Repco =

Australian automotive engineering/retailer company

- Formerly: Automotive Grinding Company
- Industry: Automotive
- Founded: 1922
- Founder: Geoff Russell
- Headquarters: Melbourne, Victoria, Australia
- Area served: Australia, New Zealand
- Products: Auto parts
- Services: Auto parts distributor
- Number of employees: 4,000
- Parent: Genuine Parts Company
- Website: repco.com.au

Repco as a Formula One engine manufacturer
Formula One World Championship career
- First entry: 1966 Monaco Grand Prix
- Last entry: 1969 South African Grand Prix
- Races entered: 33
- Chassis: Brabham, LDS
- Constructors' Championships: 2 (1966, 1967)
- Drivers' Championships: 2 (1966, 1967)
- Race victories: 8
- Podiums: 25
- Points: 126
- Pole positions: 7
- Fastest laps: 4

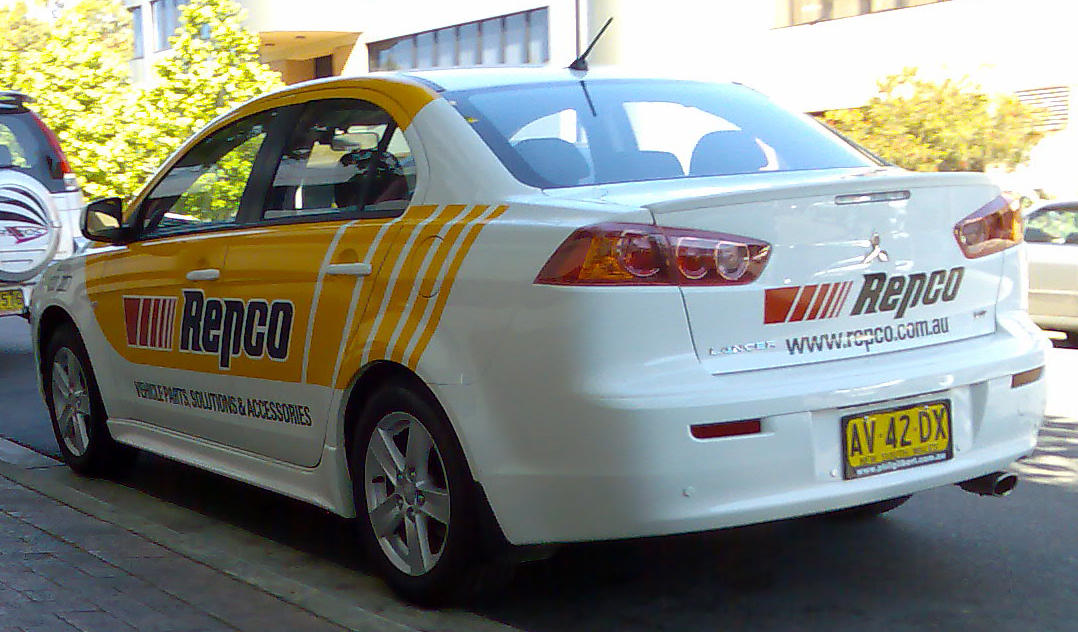
Repco Mitsubishi Lancer company car

Repco is an Australian automotive engineering/retail company. Its name is an abbreviation of Replacement Parts Company and was for many years known for reconditioning engines and for specialised manufacturing, for which it gained a high reputation. It is now best known as a retailer of spare parts and motor accessories.

The company gained fame for developing the engines that powered the Brabham Formula One cars in which Jack Brabham and Denny Hulme won the 1966 and 1967 World Championship of Drivers titles. Brabham-Repco was awarded the International Cup for F1 Manufacturers in the same two years.

Repco currently runs a series of stores across Australia and New Zealand specialising in the sale of parts and aftermarket accessories.

== History ==
Repco was founded by Geoff Russell in 1922 and first traded under the name Automotive Grinding Company, from premises in Collingwood, Victoria.

Repco was listed on the Australian Securities Exchange (ASX) in 1937. It was acquired by Pacific Dunlop in 1988 and delisted.

In September 2001 Repco was purchased by a private equity consortium, before again becoming a listed company, this time as a dual listed company on the ASX and New Zealand Exchange. Following acquisition of all shares by CCMP Capital in December 2006, Repco was again delisted. On 1 July 2013, Repco and the entire Exego group (consisting of Ashdown-Ingram, Mcleod Accessories and Motospecs) were acquired by Genuine Parts Company.

In August 2026, GPC Asia Pacific, the parent company of both Repco and Sparesbox, announced that Australian direct-to-consumer automotive retailer Sparesbox would be integrated into Repco under the Repco Performance Hub brand, with the transition taking effect from 8 September 2026.

== Sponsorships ==
Since 2021, the company has held the naming rights to the Bathurst 1000 and Supercars Championship. It previously sponsored Garry Rogers Motorsport and Dick Johnson Racing and the 1979 Round Australia Trial. In 2024, Repco became the title sponsor of the D1NZ National Drifting Championship, a sanctioned championship under Motorsport New Zealand, the official FIA appointed governing body of motor-racing in New Zealand.

== Repco V8 engine ==
In 1964 the Australian/New Zealand Tasman Series was created with a 2,500 cc capacity limit applied to engines. Jack Brabham approached Repco to develop a suitable engine, and together they decided to base the SOHC design on Oldsmobile Jetfire 215 ci block with six cylinder-head studs per cylinder. Combined with a short stroke flat-plane crankshaft, Repco designed cylinder heads, camshafts and two-stage chain/gear cam drive, a 2.5 L engine was built in 1965 with its cylinder head cast by Commonwealth Aircraft.

In 1963 the international motor racing body, the FIA, announced that the maximum engine capacity for the Formula One category would be doubled to three litres to start from the 1966 season. Despite calls for a "return to power" having been made, few teams were prepared as the main engine supplier in the UK, Coventry Climax, decided to get out of race engine building (under licence from Coventry Climax, Repco actually manufactured the 2.5L, Coventry Climax FPF straight-4 motor for the Australian and New Zealand racing markets).

Jack Brabham used his friendship with engineer Phil Irving at Repco. He proposed they design and build a 3 L version of the 2.5 L engine by using a longer stroke flat-plane crankshaft.

The Repco board agreed to his proposal in light of the expected rival 2.75 L Coventry Climax FPF DOHC engine being of four-cylinder configuration deemed to be near-obsolete, and the plan to build the Cosworth DFV (revealed at the end of 1965 by Ford, its sponsor) was not known yet. A small team at Repco under Phil Irving developed the F1 engine, fitted with two valves per cylinder SOHC heads from the 2.5L version.

The first advantage of this Repco 620 V8 was its compact size and lightness, which allowed it to be bolted into an existing 1.5-litre Formula One chassis. With no more than 310 bhp (231 kW), the Repco was by far the least powerful of the new 3-litre engines, but unlike the others it was frugal, light and compact. Also unlike the others, it was reliable and due to low weight and power, the strain on chassis, suspension, brakes and tyres was low.

This engine being based on British/American Rover V8/Buick 215 block is a common misconception. The Oldsmobile version of this engine, although sharing the same basic architecture, had cylinder heads and angled valve covers designed by Oldsmobile engineers to look like a traditional Olds V8 and was produced on a separate assembly line. Oldsmobile's intention to produce a higher-powered, turbo-charged Jetfire version led to significant differences from the Buick 215, primarily in cylinder head design: Buick used a 5-bolt pattern around each cylinder where Oldsmobile used a 6-bolt pattern. The sixth bolt was added to the intake manifold side of the head, one extra bolt for each cylinder, meant to alleviate a head-warping problem on high-compression versions. This meant that Buick heads would fit on Oldsmobile blocks, but not vice versa. Changing the compression ratio on an Oldsmobile 215 required changing the heads, but on a Buick 215, only the pistons, which was less expensive and simpler. General Motors later use of parts diagrams drawn for Oldsmobile in Buick parts catalogue showing a six-stud cylinder block sowed further confusion. Later Rover versions of the aluminum block and subsequent Buick iron small blocks went to a 4-bolt-per-cylinder pattern.

== Four world titles for the single-camshaft 16-valve ==
In 1966, the Repco engine was good enough to score three poles for Jack Brabham. In his one-off BT19, it helped him get four consecutive wins and both titles in the nine-race-long season, a unique accomplishment for a driver and constructor. This was his third title.

The 2,995.58 cc V8 Repco had a bore and stroke of 3.50 × 2.375" (88.9 × 60.3 mm). Initially it gave about 285 bhp (213 kW; 289 PS). A test-bed figure of 315 bhp (235 kW; 319 PS) at 7,800 rpm with 230 lb⋅ft (310 N⋅m) torque at 6,500 rpm was obtained. In race trim, about 299 bhp (223 kW; 303 PS) was available. In 1967, the bore and stroke remained unaltered. In that year, 330 bhp (246 kW; 335 PS) bhp at 8,500 rpm was often quoted. A test-bed figure of 327 bhp (244 kW; 332 PS) at 8,300 rpm was recorded. For 1968, a 32-valve version with 400 bhp (298 kW; 406 PS) at 9,500 rpm was planned. Only about 380 bhp (283 kW; 385 PS) at 9,000 rpm was achieved.

In 1967 the competition had made progress. Repco produced a new version of the engine, the 700 series, this time with a Repco designed block. Brabham scored two poles early in the year, but then the new Ford Cosworth DFV V8 appeared in the Lotus 49, setting a new pace with its 410 hp (310 kW) at 9,000 rpm, with Jim Clark and Graham Hill taking all poles in the rest of the season. As the Lotus was still fragile, the Brabham drivers scored two wins each. Brabham used new parts on his cars, which was not always helpful, so Denis Hulme collected more results and the title, followed by Brabham himself, who again won the constructors' title.

== The double-camshaft 32-valve ==
The new Ford engine, which was made available to other teams in 1968 also, convinced Brabham that more power was needed. With hindsight Brabham commented that the single cam motor's reliability may have been enough to supplant the more powerful Cosworths as late as the 1968 season. A new version of the Repco V8, with gear-driven double-overhead camshafts and four valves per cylinder, was produced for 1968 to maintain its competitiveness. A figure of 400 bhp (298 kW; 406 PS) at 9,500 rpm was targeted but only about 380 bhp (283 kW; 385 PS) at 9,000 rpm was achieved. The season was a disaster as it proved very unreliable due to insurmountable valve gear unreliability. There was also a 4.2-litre derivative for the Indianapolis 500. Jochen Rindt, who had moved to Brabham at the wrong time, managed to score two poles and two podiums that year, while Brabham himself collected only two points. The Repco project had always been hindered by the lengthy lines of communication between the UK and Australia, which made correcting problems very difficult. Repco, having spent far more money than originally envisaged and having sold very few customer versions of its engine, stopped the project.

For 1969, the works Brabham team and most of the private Brabham entries also used the ubiquitous Cosworth powerplant. A pair of older Brabham-Repcos were entered in the season opening 1969 South African Grand Prix by local drivers Sam Tingle and Peter de Klerk, but no points were scored on the engine marque's last appearance in the world championship.

Also, LDS fitted with Repcos were used in the South African Grand Prix in the late 1960s, as well as in the national F1 series there.

== Other racing ==
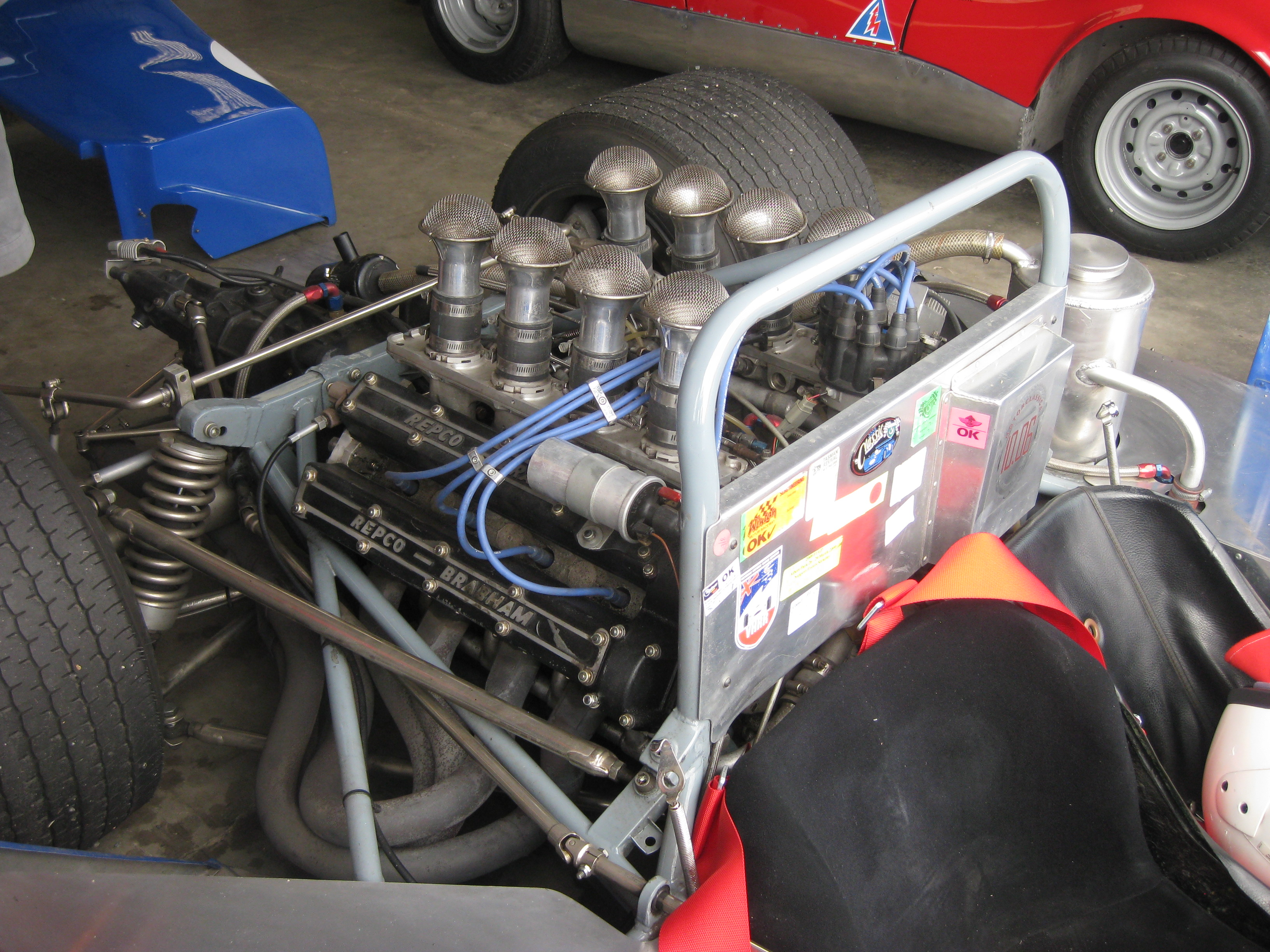
Repco Brabham 760 series 5-litre quad cam V8 engine in the Matich SR4 sports car

Repco had been involved in Australian motor racing many years prior to the association with Brabham. Most famous had been development of the engine of the series of Maybach Specials in the 1950s to various wins including the 1954 New Zealand Grand Prix.

The Brabham-Repco project was initially aimed at the Tasman Series, where Coventry-Climax's obsolete FPF four-cylinder engine was dominant in the mid-1960s. The 2.5-litre version of the Repco V8 was never very successful in this series, initially producing no more power than the FPF. It did, however, record one Tasman Series round win with Jack Brabham driving his Repco powered Brabham BT23A to victory in the 1967 South Pacific Trophy at the Longford Circuit in Tasmania.

Brabham-Repco's were also prepared and entered in the 1968 and 1969 Indianapolis 500. In 1969, Peter Revson finished fifth in such a car. He also won a USAC race in the same year.

1969 saw Leo Geoghegan drive his Lotus 39 powered by the 2.5L Repco V8 to victory in the inaugural Japanese Automobile Federation (JAF) Grand Prix held at the Fuji Speedway in Japan. The race was run to Formula Libre regulations with 2.5L cars mixed with Formula 2 and 1.6L cars.

Further versions of the V8 engine were produced, including a 4.3-litre variant for sports car racing and a turbo-charged version intended for United States Automobile Club races. Neither version met with any international success, the turbo in particular being labelled 'Puff the Tragic Wagon' by its development team due to its lack of horsepower (compared with "Puff, the Magic Dragon").

The sports car engine (increased in size to 5.0 litres) was, however, dominant domestically, powering cars to several wins in the Australian Sports Car Championship and its predecessor the Australian Tourist Trophy, most notably powering the Matich sports cars built and raced by Frank Matich, and Elfin Sports Cars built and raced by Garrie Cooper.

== Repco Brabham racing cars ==
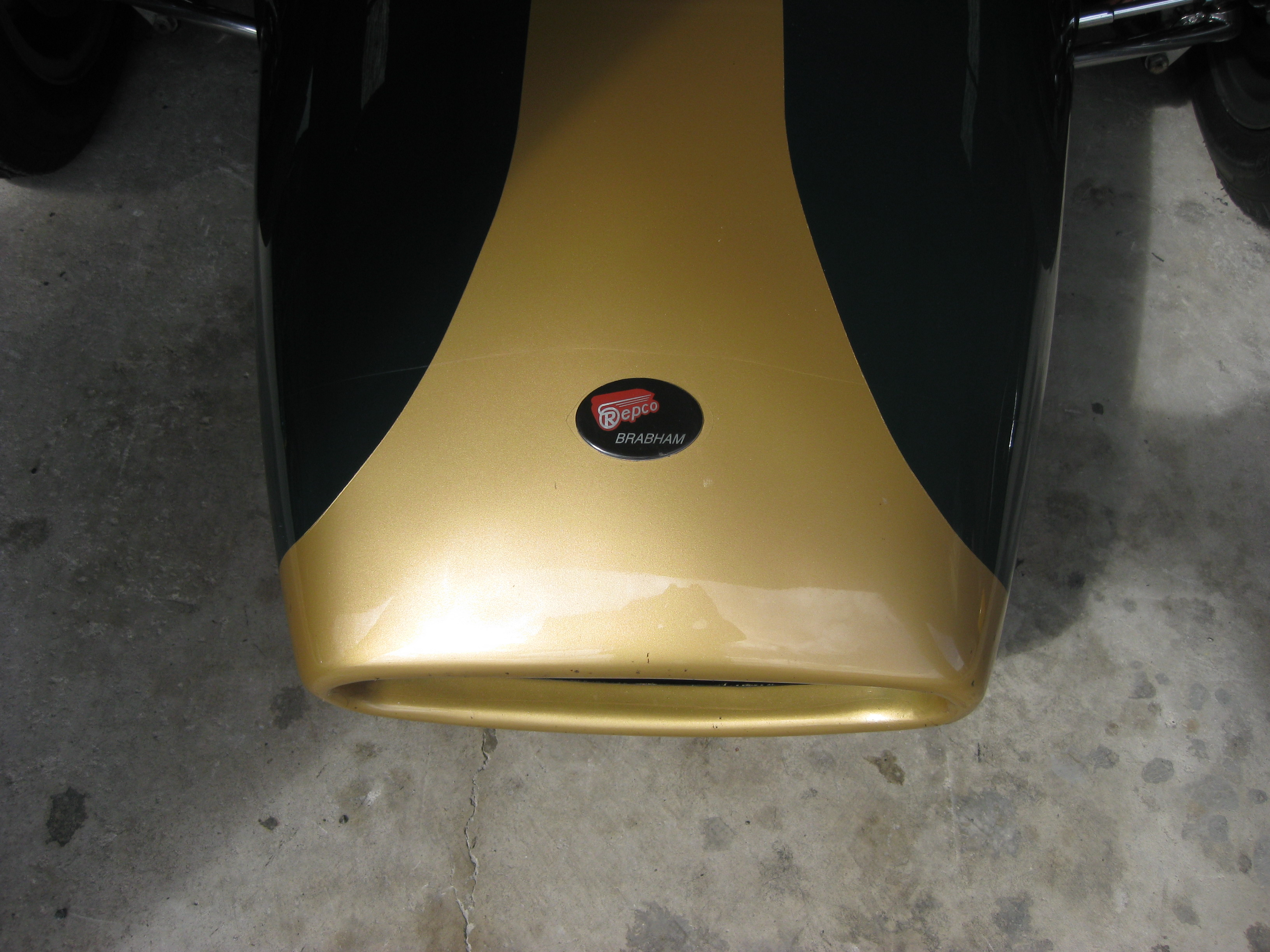
Repco Brabham badge on the nose of a Repco Brabham BT6 racing car

When Jack Brabham began building racing cars in England he named his cars Repco Brabhams, the result of a sponsorship deal between Brabham and Repco. This name was applied regardless of the engine used, and the arrangement existed through to the end of the 1960s. The agreement saw Repco's international marketing of its automotive parts and service equipment supported by Brabham's racing achievements.

== Formula 5000 engines ==
=== Repco Holden ===
Repco also developed and built the Repco-Holden Formula 5000 engine for Formula 5000 racing. Repco used the block and head castings of the Holden 308 V8 engine as its basis, but it featured many modifications including Lucas fuel injection, dual-coil Bosch ignition and more than 150 special components designed by Repco. The engine first tasted success in the 1970 Australian Grand Prix that was won by Frank Matich driving a Repco-Holden powered McLaren M10B.

The engine was then used extensively in racing vehicles including cars competing in the Tasman Series, the Australian Drivers' Championship, the Australian Sports Car Championship and the Australian Sports Sedan Championship.

By 1976, power for the 4.9 L (4,940 cc) Repco-Holden V8 (a slightly smaller cubic capacity than the base 5.0 L (5,044 cc) Holden) was rated at approximately 500 bhp (373 kW; 507 PS). This compared to approximately 520 bhp (388 kW; 527 PS) for the 5.0 L (4,958 cc) Chevrolet V8 and 470 bhp (350 kW; 477 PS) for the 4.9 L (4,931 cc) Repco Leyland V8.

Due to the success of the Repco-Holden V8, Holden enlisted Repco to carry out the development work (on the dynamometer only, according to Holden Dealer Team boss Harry Firth) on Holden's 308 engine for its Torana SL/R 5000 that was released in 1974. Firth believed that developing the engine on the dyno and not on the race track saw continual problems for the engine such as oil surge—especially in touring car racing. He also claimed to have already cured the oil problems while developing the still-born Torana GTR XU-1 V8 in 1972 and that Holden ignored his warnings about the Repco engine.

The list of Repco-Holden's Formula 5000 engine race, championship and series wins includes:

Australian Grand Prix

- 1970 – Frank Matich, McLaren M10B
- 1971 – Frank Matich, Matich A50
- 1976 – John Goss, Matich A53

Australian Drivers' Championship

- 1972 – Frank Matich, Matich A50
- 1973 – John McCormack, Elfin MR5
- 1975 – John McCormack, Elfin MR6

New Zealand Grand Prix

- 1973 – John McCormack, Elfin MR5
- 1974 – John McCormack, Elfin MR5

Australian Sports Car Championship

- 1975 – Garrie Cooper, Elfin MS7

Australian Sports Sedan Championship

- 1980 – Tony Edmondson, Alfa Romeo Alfetta GTV

Australian Tourist Trophy

- 1976 – Stuart Kostera, Elfin MS7

Toby Lee Series

- 1974 – John McCormack, Chrysler Charger

=== Repco Leyland ===
After the initial success of the Repco Holden engine, Australian racer John McCormack began looking for a cheaper and lighter alternative to the Holden and Chevrolet engines. In 1974, he and former Repco Brabham engineer Phil Irving found what they were looking for in the 4.4L alloy block Rover V8 engine that powered the Leyland P76. In its standard form, the 4.4 L (4,414 cc) engine produced approximately 200 bhp (149 kW; 203 PS). After being highly modified by Repco to be upsized to 4.9 L (4,931 cc), and after much development over three years, the Repco-Leyland V8 eventually produced around 470 bhp (350 kW; 477 PS) at its peak in 1977, which although a fair bit less than the power on offer from the Repco Holden and Chevrolet engines, was offset by the fact that it weighed only 160 kg (352.7 lb) compared to the cast iron blocks of the Holden (220 kg (485.0 lb)) and the Chevrolet (231.5 kg (510.4 lb)) engines.

In 1976, McCormack had purchased the 1973 British Grand Prix winning McLaren M23 (Chassis No. M23-2) from South African racer Dave Charlton and modified the car for Formula 5000 racing (the car was bought with all spares, but Charlton kept the Cosworth DFV engine). The Leyland was primarily chosen because its weight was comparable to that of the 168 kg (370.4 lb) DFV that the car had originally been designed to use and thus wouldn't upset the more finely tuned handling of the former Formula One race winner as would the much heavier Chevrolet or Holden V8s.

While McCormack would win the 1977 Australian Drivers' Championship with the Repco-Leyland, the engines themselves were known to be on the brittle side and often lacked the reliability of the Chevrolet and Holden V8s.

The list of Repco-Leyland's Formula 5000 engine race, championship and series results includes:

- 1976 Australian Drivers' Championship – 3rd (1 win @ Calder Park)
- 1977 Rothmans International Series – 9th
- 1977 Australian Drivers' Championship – 1st (1 win @ Surfers Paradise)
- 1977 Australian Grand Prix @ Oran Park – DNF (engine)
- 1978 Australian Drivers' Championship – 2nd (1 win @ Oran Park)
- 1978 Australian Grand Prix @ Sandown Raceway – DNF (engine) – Pole Position
- 1979 Rothmans International Series – 9th
- 1979 Australian Grand Prix @ Wanneroo Park – DNF (gearbox)

== International Cup for F1 Manufacturers – results ==
- 1966 Brabham-Repco – 1st
- 1967 Brabham-Repco – 1st
- 1968 Brabham-Repco – 8th
- 1969 Brabham-Repco – NC

== World Championship of Drivers – results ==
Year	Team	Driver	# of GPs	WC
1966	Brabham-Repco	Jack Brabham	9	World Champion
1966	Brabham-Repco	Denny Hulme	7	4th
1967	Brabham-Repco	Denny Hulme	11	World Champion
1967	Brabham-Repco	Jack Brabham	11	2nd
1967	Brabham-Repco	Guy Ligier	5	
1968	Brabham-Repco	Jochen Rindt	12	12th
1968	Brabham-Repco	Jack Brabham	11	23rd
1968	Brabham-Repco	Silvio Moser	4	23rd
1968	Brabham-Repco	Dan Gurney	1	
1968	Brabham-Repco	Dave Charlton	1	
1968	Brabham-Repco	John Love	1	
1968	Brabham-Repco	Kurt Ahrens Jr.	1	
1968	LDS-Repco	Sam Tingle	1	
1969	Brabham-Repco	Peter de Klerk	1	
1969	Brabham-Repco	Sam Tingle	1	

== Complete Formula One World Championship results ==
(key) (results in bold indicate pole position) (results in italics indicate fastest lap)

Year	Entrant	Chassis	Engine	Tyre	Drivers	1	2	3	4	5	6	7	8	9	10	11	12	Points	WCC
1966	Brabham Racing Organisation	Brabham BT19; Brabham BT20	620 3.0 V8	G		MON	BEL	FRA	GBR	NED	GER	ITA	USA	MEX				42 (49)	1st
1966	Brabham Racing Organisation	Brabham BT19; Brabham BT20	620 3.0 V8	G	(Australia) Jack Brabham	Ret	4	1	**1**	**1**	1	Ret	**Ret**	2				42 (49)	1st
1966	Brabham Racing Organisation	Brabham BT19; Brabham BT20	620 3.0 V8	G	(New Zealand) Denny Hulme			3	2	Ret	Ret	3	Ret	3				42 (49)	1st
1967	Brabham Racing Organisation	Brabham BT19; Brabham BT20; Brabham BT24	620 3.0 V8; 740 3.0 V8	G		RSA	MON	NED	BEL	FRA	GBR	GER	CAN	ITA	USA	MEX		63 (67)	1st
1967	Brabham Racing Organisation	Brabham BT19; Brabham BT20; Brabham BT24	620 3.0 V8; 740 3.0 V8	G	(Australia) Jack Brabham	**6**	**Ret**	2	Ret	1	4	2	1	2	5	2		63 (67)	1st
1967	Brabham Racing Organisation	Brabham BT19; Brabham BT20; Brabham BT24	620 3.0 V8; 740 3.0 V8	G	(New Zealand) Denny Hulme	4	1	3	Ret	2	2	1	2	Ret	3	3		63 (67)	1st
1967	Guy Ligier	Brabham BT20	620 3.0 V8	F	(France) Guy Ligier						10	8		Ret	Ret	11		63 (67)	1st
1968	Brabham Racing Organisation	Brabham BT24; Brabham BT26	740 3.0 V8; 860 3.0 V8	G		RSA	ESP	MON	BEL	NED	FRA	GBR	GER	ITA	CAN	USA	MEX	10	8th
1968	Brabham Racing Organisation	Brabham BT24; Brabham BT26	740 3.0 V8; 860 3.0 V8	G	(Australia) Jack Brabham	Ret	DNS	Ret	Ret	Ret	Ret	Ret	5	Ret	Ret	Ret	10	10	8th
1968	Brabham Racing Organisation	Brabham BT24; Brabham BT26	740 3.0 V8; 860 3.0 V8	G	(Austria) Jochen Rindt	3	Ret	Ret	Ret	Ret	**Ret**	Ret	3	Ret	**Ret**	Ret	Ret	10	8th
1968	Brabham Racing Organisation	Brabham BT24; Brabham BT26	740 3.0 V8; 860 3.0 V8	G	(United States) Dan Gurney					Ret								10	8th
1968	Team Gunston	Brabham BT20	620 3.0 V8	F	(Rhodesia) John Love	9												10	8th
1968	Scuderia Scribante	Brabham BT11	620 3.0 V8	F	(South Africa) Dave Charlton	Ret												10	8th
1968	Charles Vögele Racing	Brabham BT20	620 3.0 V8	G	(Switzerland) Silvio Moser			DNQ		5		NC	DNS	DNQ				10	8th
1968	Caltex Racing Team	Brabham BT24	740 3.0 V8	D	(West Germany) Kurt Ahrens Jr.								12					10	8th
1968	Team Gunston	LDS Mk3	620 3.0 V8	F	(Rhodesia) Sam Tingle	Ret												0	NC
1969	Team Gunston	Brabham BT24	620 3.0 V8	F		RSA	ESP	MON	NED	FRA	GBR	GER	ITA	CAN	USA	MEX		0	NC
1969	Team Gunston	Brabham BT24	620 3.0 V8	F	(Rhodesia) Sam Tingle	8												0	NC
1969	Jack Holme	Brabham BT20	620 3.0 V8	G	(South Africa) Peter de Klerk	NC												0	NC
