= McLaren M23 =

Formula One racing car

McLaren M23 McLaren M23B McLaren M23C McLaren M23D McLaren M23E
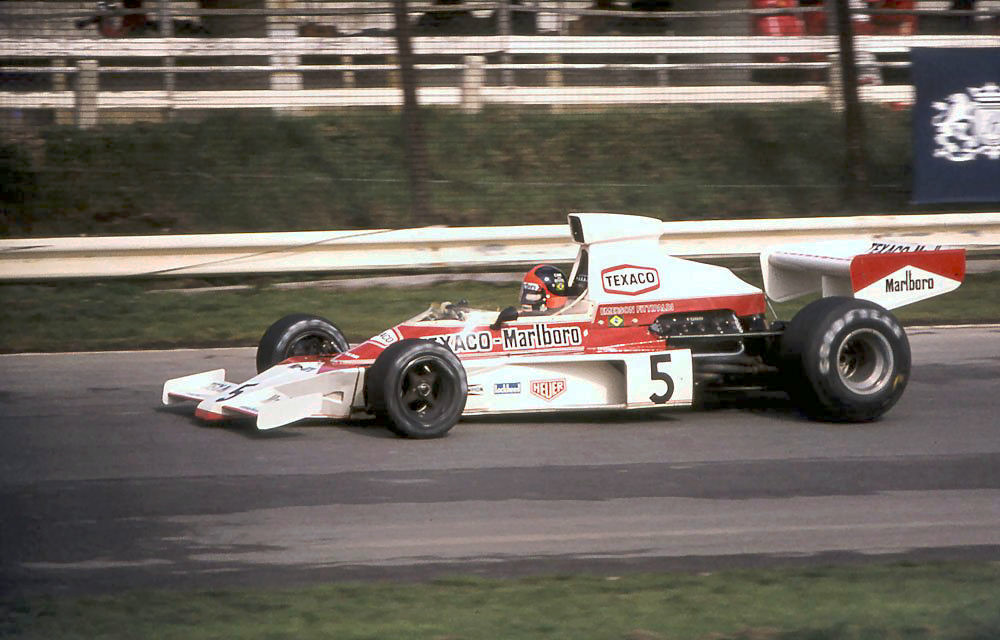
- Emerson Fittipaldi in the McLaren M23 at the 1974 British Grand Prix.
- Category: Formula One
- Constructor: McLaren Racing
- Designers: Gordon Coppuck (Chief Designer); John Barnard (Design Engineer); Dave Quill (Design Engineer); Ray Stokoe (Design Engineer)
- Predecessor: M19C
- Successor: M26

Technical specifications
- Chassis: Aluminium monocoque.
- Suspension (front): Double wishbone, with inboard coilover shock absorbers.
- Suspension (rear): Double wishbone.
- Axle track: 62 in (157 cm)
- Wheelbase: 101 in (257 cm)
- Engine: Ford-Cosworth DFV 2,993 cc (182.6 cu in) 90° V8, naturally aspirated, mid-mounted.
- Transmission: Hewland FG400 5/6-speed manual gearbox.
- Power: 465 hp (347 kW) @ 10,800 rpm 280 lb⋅ft (380 N⋅m) torque
- Weight: 575 kg (1,268 lb)

Competition history
- Notable entrants: Yardley Team McLaren; Marlboro Team Texaco; Marlboro Team McLaren
- Notable drivers: (New Zealand) Denny Hulme (United States) Peter Revson (West Germany) Jochen Mass (United Kingdom) Mike Hailwood (Brazil) Emerson Fittipaldi (United Kingdom) James Hunt
- Debut: 1973 South African Grand Prix
Races	Wins	Poles	F/Laps
83	16	14	10
- Constructors' Championships: 1 (1974)
- Drivers' Championships: 2 (1974: Fittipaldi; 1976: Hunt)
- Unless otherwise stated, all data refer to Formula One World Championship Grands Prix only.

The McLaren M23 was a Formula One racing car designed by Gordon Coppuck, with input from John Barnard, and built by the McLaren team. It was a development of the McLaren M16 Indianapolis 500 car. A Ford Cosworth DFV engine was used, which was prepared by specialist tuning company Nicholson-McLaren Engines. This helped push the DFV's horsepower output to around 490 bhp.

A total of 13 chassis were built, with serial numbers 1 to 12 and 14. No number 13 chassis was built, as it was deemed to be unlucky.

== History ==
=== 1973 ===
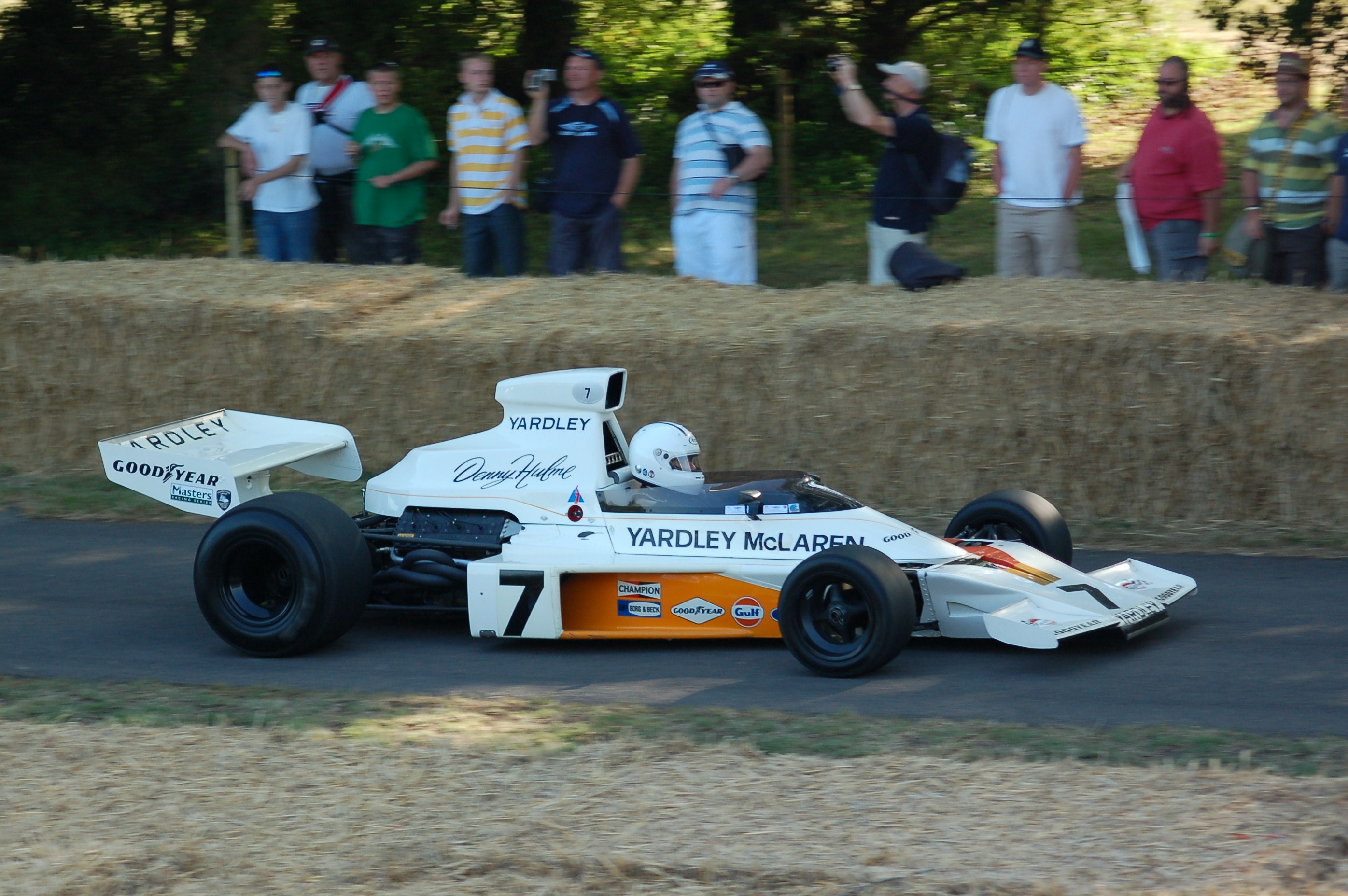
Denny Hulme's 1973 McLaren-Ford M23 being demonstrated at the Goodwood Festival of Speed

The M19 had reached the end of its development life and a new design was needed to keep pace with the latest generation of Formula One cars and regulations regarding deformable crash protection structures. Taking inspiration from the M16 Indycar and utilising the M19's rear suspension design, the new M23 was introduced for the 1973 season, and scored pole position with Denny Hulme on its very first outing. Hulme and Peter Revson took three wins between them that season, while rookie Jody Scheckter nearly added a fourth. Scheckter was responsible for one of the biggest accidents Formula One has ever seen, at the 1973 British Grand Prix, when he spun his M23 in front of the pack.

=== 1974 ===
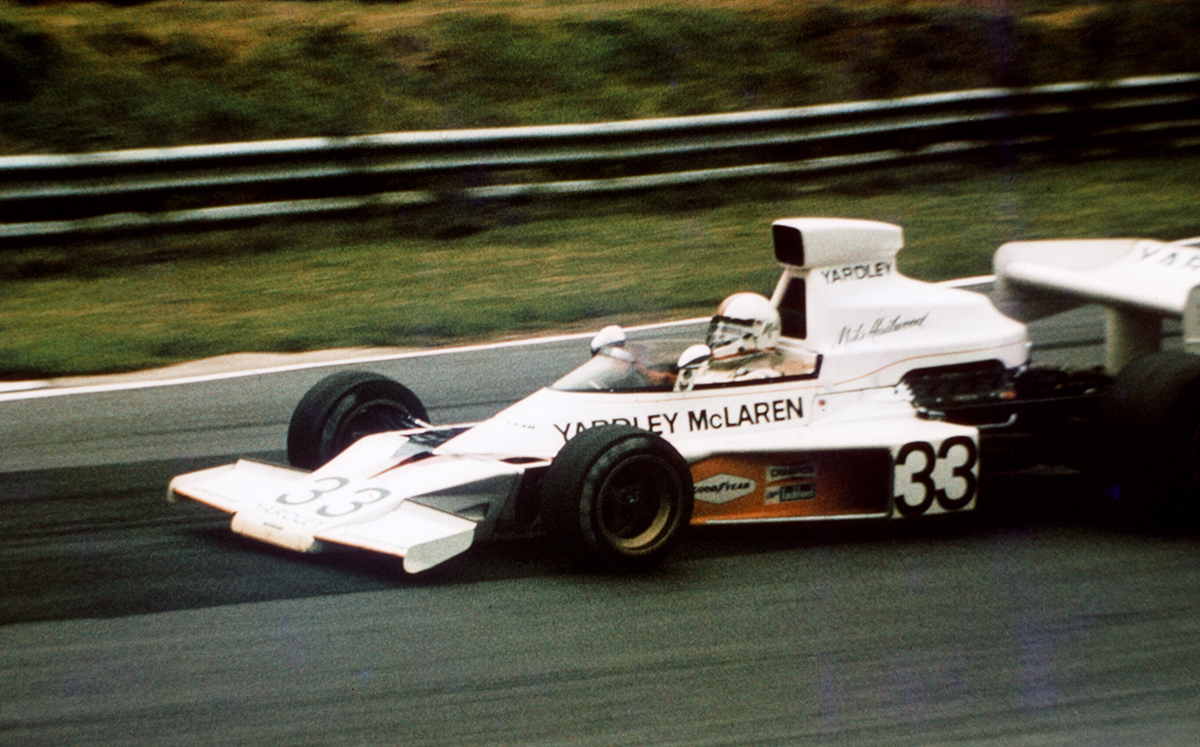
Mike Hailwood driving a Yardley-liveried McLaren M23 at Brands Hatch in 1974

Emerson Fittipaldi joined McLaren from Lotus in 1974. His knowledge of the Lotus 72 helped McLaren develop the M23B and that season Fittipaldi gave McLaren its first drivers' and constructors' world championships, beating Ferrari, Tyrrell and Lotus with four wins.

The season saw Marlboro become title sponsors of the team, which they would continue to be so until 1996. Fittipaldi worked on improving the car; a wider track and longer wheelbase were adopted. The revised M23 featured redesigned bodywork, wings and aerodynamics were introduced during the year.

Fittipaldi took three wins, while Hulme won once in a closely fought season.

=== 1975 ===
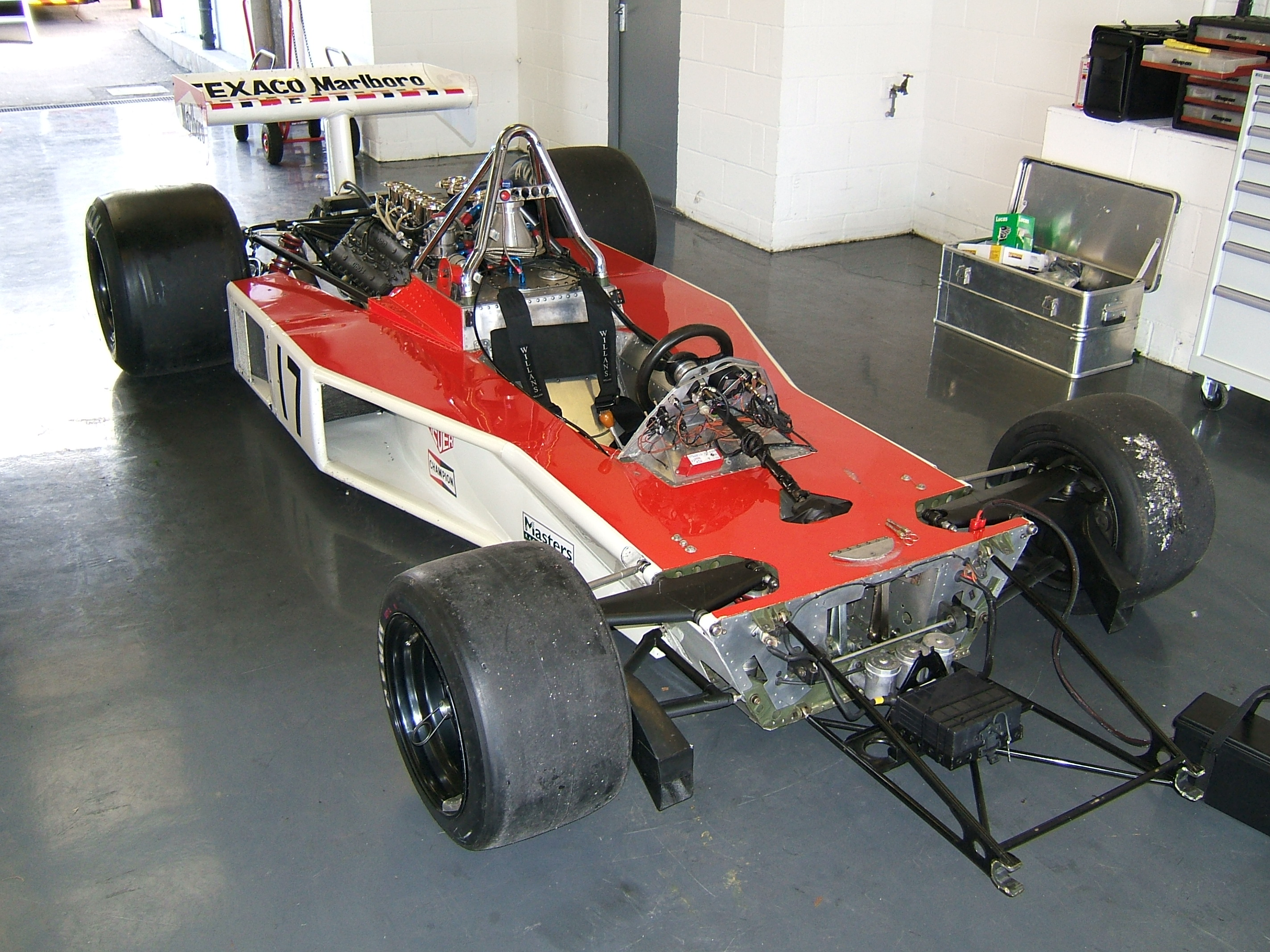
A McLaren M23 with much of its bodywork and front wing removed, Cosworth DFV visible in the rear. Note the exposed pedals between the front wheels and minimal upper-body crash protection, very different from today's F1 cars.

Further development in 1975 – including a 6-speed gearbox, a novelty for the time – resulted in the M23C, and helped Fittipaldi to second in the drivers' championship behind Niki Lauda, who had the benefit of Ferrari's 312T chassis and McLaren to third in the constructors' championship, behind Ferrari and Brabham.

The team experimented with different bodywork styles, including aerodynamic kickups in front of the rear wheels, different nose profiles and extended bodywork in front of the rear wheels, housing the oil coolers.

Also making an appearance were side mounted skirts which sealed the underside of the car to the racetrack, a precursor to the ground effect technology first seen properly with the Lotus 78. Most of these changes were adopted for the M23 and its successor, the McLaren M26.

=== 1976 ===
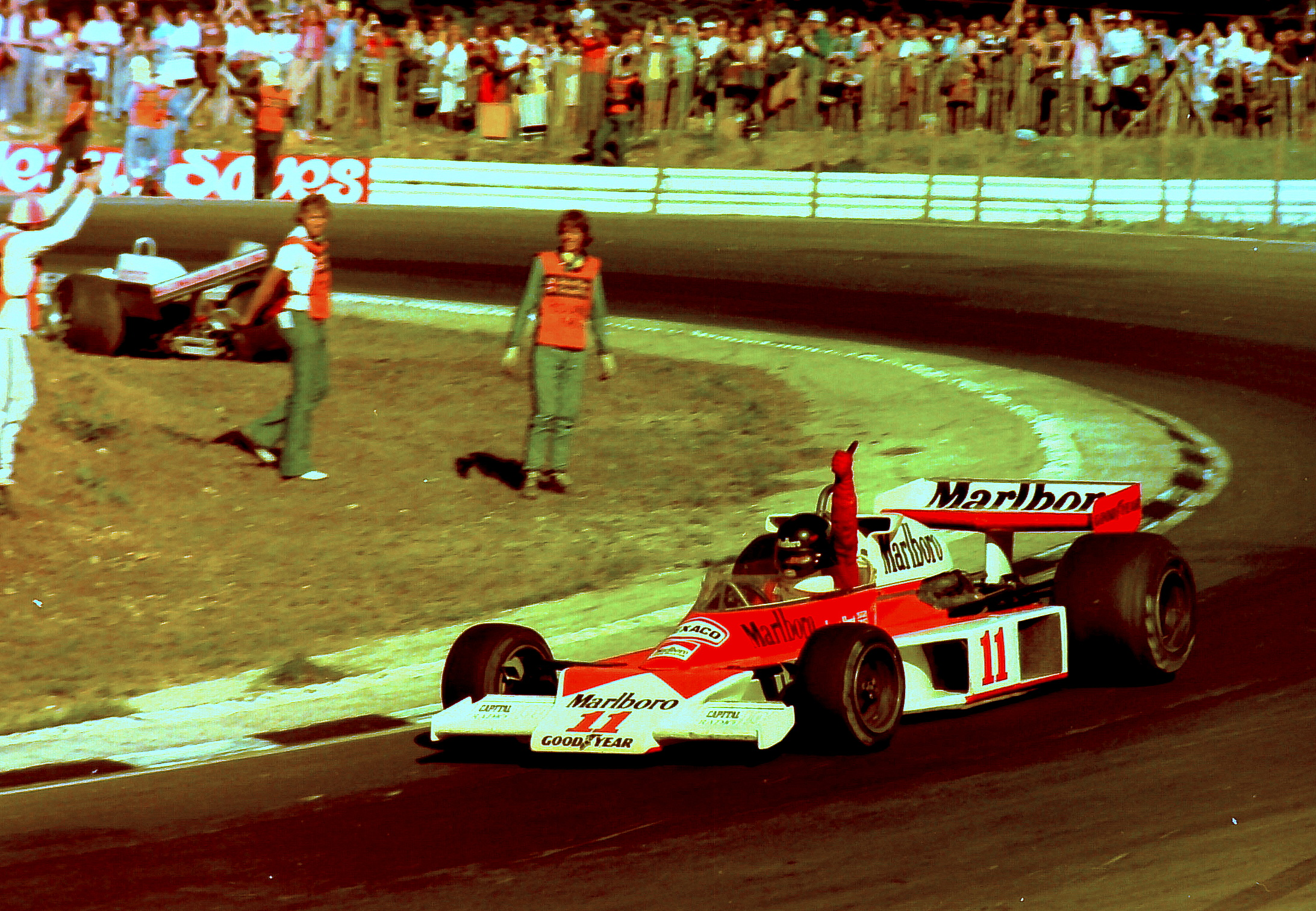
James Hunt won the British Grand Prix, but was later disqualified after the race.

At the end of 1975 Fittipaldi left the team to join his brother's Copersucar-sponsored Fittipaldi Automotive team. He was replaced by James Hunt, who went on to win a dramatic and controversial 1976 season with the M23D.

New regulations outlawing the tall airboxes over the engines were introduced for the Spanish Grand Prix. As a result the M23 sported mid mounted air scoops on either side of the roll bar. The oil coolers were repositioned to be in front of the rear wheels.

James Hunt won six races on his way to the world championship.

=== 1977 ===
The M26 was seen as the future and development had ended on the M23 by the end of 1976. However, when the new car proved troublesome, Hunt and Jochen Mass relied on the M23E in the early part of the 1977 season, and even though the car was now four years old it was still competitive, earning several pole positions and podium finishes.

Gilles Villeneuve made his Grand Prix debut at the 1977 British Grand Prix in an M23.

The M23 was not the most technically advanced F1 car compared to its competitors, but preparation and continual development helped it win 16 Grands Prix, two drivers' and one constructors' world championships in its lifetime.

=== Formula 5000 ===
The M23 that was sold to South African racer Dave Charlton who used it to run 14th in the 1975 South African Grand Prix at Kyalami (Peter Revson's 1973 British Grand Prix winning chassis No.M23-2), was then sold off to Adelaide based Australian racing driver John McCormack who had the car modified for use in Formula 5000 racing. With assistance from former Repco Brabham engineer Phil Irving, using a Repco modified, 4.9 L (4,931 cc), 470 bhp (350 kW; 477 PS) Leyland V8 in place of the Cosworth DFV, McCormack claimed the 1977 Australian Drivers' Championship. McCormack had chosen the alloy block Leyland for the car as it was similar in weight to the DFV the car was designed to use (the Leyland only weighed 160 kg (352.7 lb), just 8 kg (17.6 lb) less than the Cosworth) and caused much less of a handling imbalance than would have the much heavier Chevrolet (231.5 kg (510.4 lb)) or Repco Holden (220 kg (485.0 lb)) V8 alternatives in use in Australian F5000 racing. What the Repco Leyland gave away in power (both the alternatives were putting out at least 500 bhp (373 kW; 507 PS)) was often more than compensated for by the more finely tuned handling of the former British Grand Prix winning car. Unfortunately though, what the Repco Leyland really did lack against its rivals was not just outright power, but reliability.

McCormack also put his M23 on pole for the 1978 Australian Grand Prix, though a cracked head caused by a blown head gasket only discovered on the grid before the formation lap meant an early retirement from the race.

McLaren-Cosworth M23

== Complete Formula One World Championship results ==
(key) (results in bold indicate pole position; results in italics indicate fastest lap)

Year	Entrant	Engine	Tyres	Drivers	No.	1	2	3	4	5	6	7	8	9	10	11	12	13	14	15	16	17	Points	WCC
1973	Yardley Team McLaren	Ford Cosworth DFV; 3.0 V8	G			ARG	BRA	RSA	ESP	BEL	MON	SWE	FRA	GBR	NED	GER	AUT	ITA	CAN	USA			**58***	3rd
1973	Yardley Team McLaren	Ford Cosworth DFV; 3.0 V8	G	Denny Hulme				**5**	6	7	6	1	8	3	Ret	12	8	15	13	4			**58***	3rd
1973	Yardley Team McLaren	Ford Cosworth DFV; 3.0 V8	G	Peter Revson					4	Ret	5	7		1	4	9	Ret	3	1	5			**58***	3rd
1973	Yardley Team McLaren	Ford Cosworth DFV; 3.0 V8	G	Jody Scheckter									Ret	DNS					Ret	Ret			**58***	3rd
1973	Yardley Team McLaren	Ford Cosworth DFV; 3.0 V8	G	Jacky Ickx												3							**58***	3rd
1974	Marlboro Team Texaco	Ford Cosworth DFV; 3.0 V8	G			ARG	BRA	RSA	ESP	BEL	MON	SWE	NED	FRA	GBR	GER	AUT	ITA	CAN	USA			**73 (75)**	1st
1974	Marlboro Team Texaco	Ford Cosworth DFV; 3.0 V8	G	Emerson Fittipaldi	5	10	**1**	7	3	1	5	4	3	Ret	2	Ret	Ret	2	**1**	4			**73 (75)**	1st
1974	Marlboro Team Texaco	Ford Cosworth DFV; 3.0 V8	G	Denny Hulme	6	1	12	9	6	6	Ret	Ret	Ret	6	7	DSQ	2	6	6	Ret			**73 (75)**	1st
1974	Yardley Team McLaren	Ford Cosworth DFV; 3.0 V8	G	Mike Hailwood	33	4	5	3	9	7	Ret	Ret	4	7	Ret	15							**73 (75)**	1st
1974	Yardley Team McLaren	Ford Cosworth DFV; 3.0 V8	G	David Hobbs	33												7	9					**73 (75)**	1st
1974	Yardley Team McLaren	Ford Cosworth DFV; 3.0 V8	G	Jochen Mass	33														16	7			**73 (75)**	1st
1974	Scribante Lucky Strike Racing	Ford Cosworth DFV; 3.0 V8	G	Dave Charlton	23			19															**73 (75)**	1st
1975	Marlboro Team Texaco	Ford Cosworth DFV; 3.0 V8	G			ARG	BRA	RSA	ESP	MON	BEL	SWE	NED	FRA	GBR	GER	AUT	ITA	USA				**53**	3rd
1975	Marlboro Team Texaco	Ford Cosworth DFV; 3.0 V8	G	Emerson Fittipaldi	1	1	2	Ret	DNS	2	7	8	Ret	4	1	Ret	9	2	2				**53**	3rd
1975	Marlboro Team Texaco	Ford Cosworth DFV; 3.0 V8	G	Jochen Mass	2	14	3	6	1	6	Ret	Ret	Ret	3	7	Ret	4	Ret	3				**53**	3rd
1975	Lucky Strike Racing	Ford Cosworth DFV; 3.0 V8	G	Dave Charlton	31			14															**53**	3rd
1976	Marlboro Team McLaren	Ford Cosworth DFV; 3.0 V8	G			BRA	RSA	USW	ESP	BEL	MON	SWE	FRA	GBR	GER	AUT	NED	ITA	CAN	USA	JPN		**74 (75)**	2nd
1976	Marlboro Team McLaren	Ford Cosworth DFV; 3.0 V8	G	James Hunt	11	**Ret**	**2**	Ret	**1**	Ret	Ret	5	**1**	DSQ	**1**	**4**	1	Ret	**1**	**1**	3		**74 (75)**	2nd
1976	Marlboro Team McLaren	Ford Cosworth DFV; 3.0 V8	G	Jochen Mass	12	6	3	5	Ret	6	5	11	15	Ret	3	7		Ret	5	4	Ret		**74 (75)**	2nd
1977	Marlboro Team McLaren	Ford Cosworth DFV; 3.0 V8	G			ARG	BRA	RSA	USW	ESP	MON	BEL	SWE	FRA	GBR	GER	AUT	NED	ITA	USA	CAN	JPN	**60***	3rd
1977	Marlboro Team McLaren	Ford Cosworth DFV; 3.0 V8	G	James Hunt	1	**Ret**	**2**	**4**	7		Ret												**60***	3rd
1977	Marlboro Team McLaren	Ford Cosworth DFV; 3.0 V8	G	Jochen Mass	2	Ret	Ret	5	Ret	4	4	Ret	2	9									**60***	3rd
1977	Marlboro Team McLaren	Ford Cosworth DFV; 3.0 V8	G	Bruno Giacomelli	14														Ret				**60***	3rd
1977	Marlboro Team McLaren	Ford Cosworth DFV; 3.0 V8	G	Gilles Villeneuve	40										11								**60***	3rd
1977	Iberia Airlines	Ford Cosworth DFV; 3.0 V8	G	Emilio de Villota	36					13		DNQ	DNQ		DNQ	DNQ	17		DNQ				**60***	3rd
1977	Chesterfield Racing	Ford Cosworth DFV; 3.0 V8	G	Brett Lunger	30							DNS	11	DNQ	13	Ret	10	9	Ret	10	11		**60***	3rd
1978	Liggett Group/ BS Fabrications	Ford Cosworth DFV 3.0 V8	G			ARG	BRA	RSA	USW	MON	BEL	ESP	SWE	FRA	GBR	GER	AUT	NED	ITA	USA	CAN		**15**	8th
1978	Liggett Group/ BS Fabrications	Ford Cosworth DFV 3.0 V8	G	Brett Lunger	30	13	Ret	11	DNQ														**15**	8th
1978	Liggett Group/ BS Fabrications	Ford Cosworth DFV 3.0 V8	G	Nelson Piquet	29												Ret	Ret	9				**15**	8th
1978	Centro Aseguredor F1	Ford Cosworth DFV 3.0 V8	G	Emilio de Villota	28							DNQ											**15**	8th
1978	Melchester Racing	Ford Cosworth DFV 3.0 V8	G	Tony Trimmer	40										DNQ								**15**	8th

* 12 points in 1973 scored using the M19A and M19C
* 39 points in 1977 scored using the M26
* All points in 1978 scored using the McLaren M26
