= Matich =

The Matich name was applied to a series of sports racing cars and open wheel racing cars produced in Australia between 1967 and 1974 under the direction of Sydney-based racing driver and engineer Frank Matich.

== SR3 ==
The Matich SR3 was a Group A Sports Car built for Matich by Bob Britton in 1967. It was powered by an Oldsmobile V8 engine and was driven to victory by Matich in the 1967 Australian Tourist Trophy, Australia's premier sports car race of that year. Later in the year, Matich raced in both the US Can-Am series and in Australia, with two SR3s fitted with 4.4-litre (270 in^{3}) Repco-Brabham RB620 V8 engines. Matich won the 1968 Australian Tourist Trophy with a Repco powered SR3.

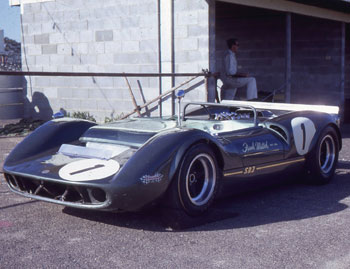
The Matich SR3 in the pits at Surfers Paradise in mid-1968

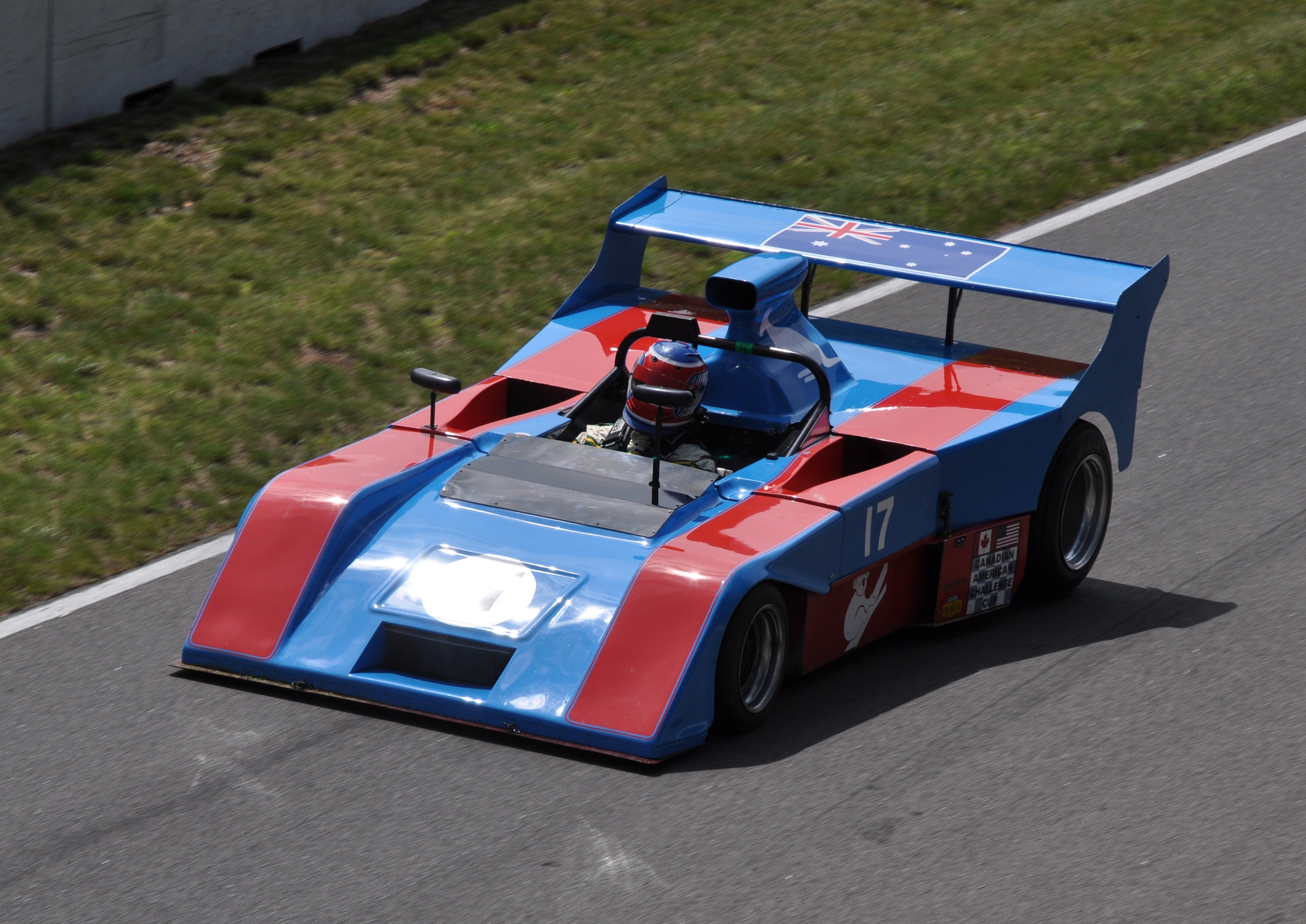
Re-bodied Matich SR3 in 2010

== SR4 ==
A completely new design, the Matich SR4, was produced with designer-frabricator Henry Nehrybecki for 1969 utilising a quad cam Repco-Brabham RB760 V8. Matich dominated the inaugural Australian Sports Car Championship in that year, winning all three heats with the SR4.

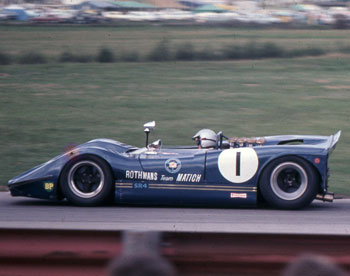
Matich in the SR4 at Surfers Paradise in May 1969

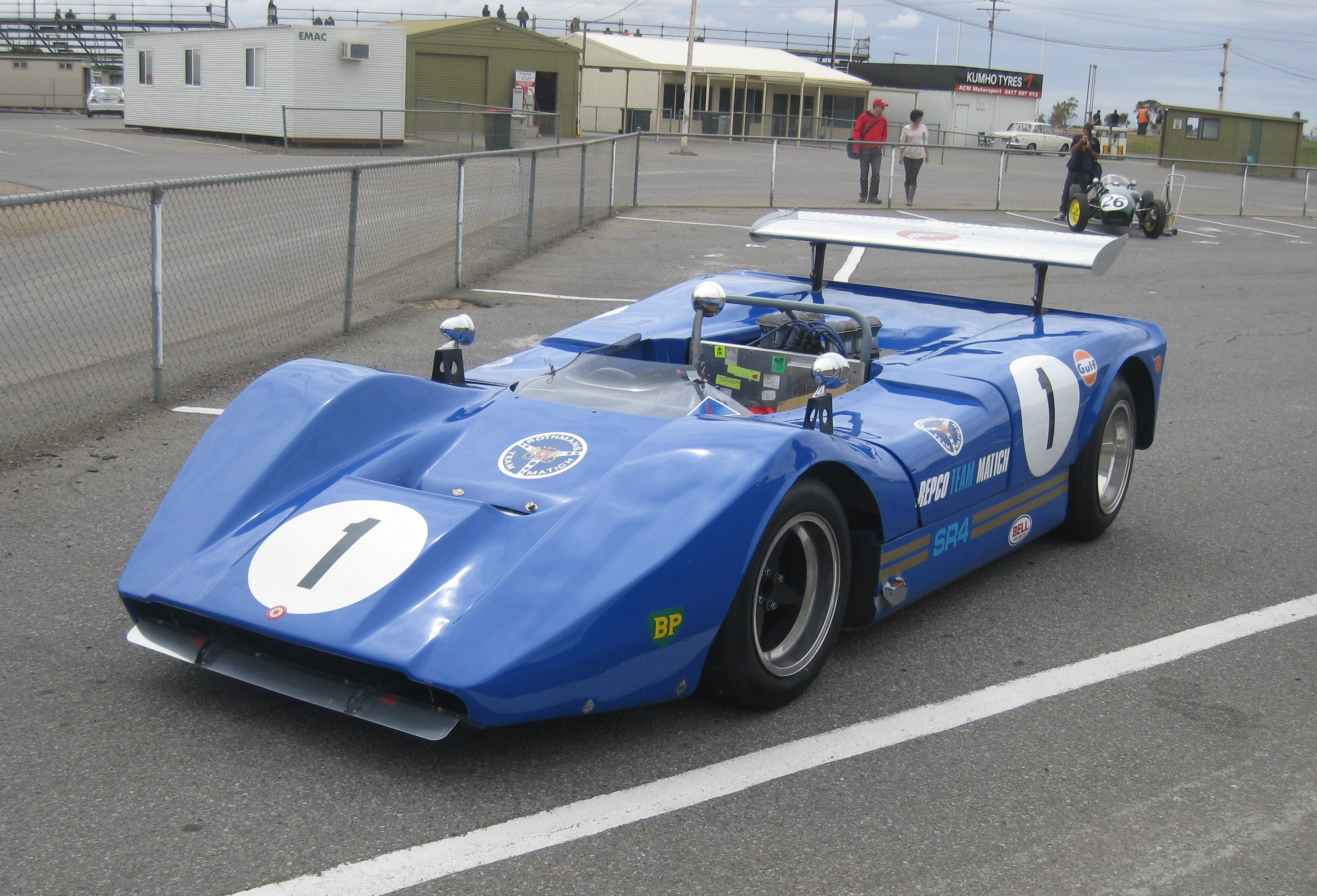
The Matich SR4 in 2013

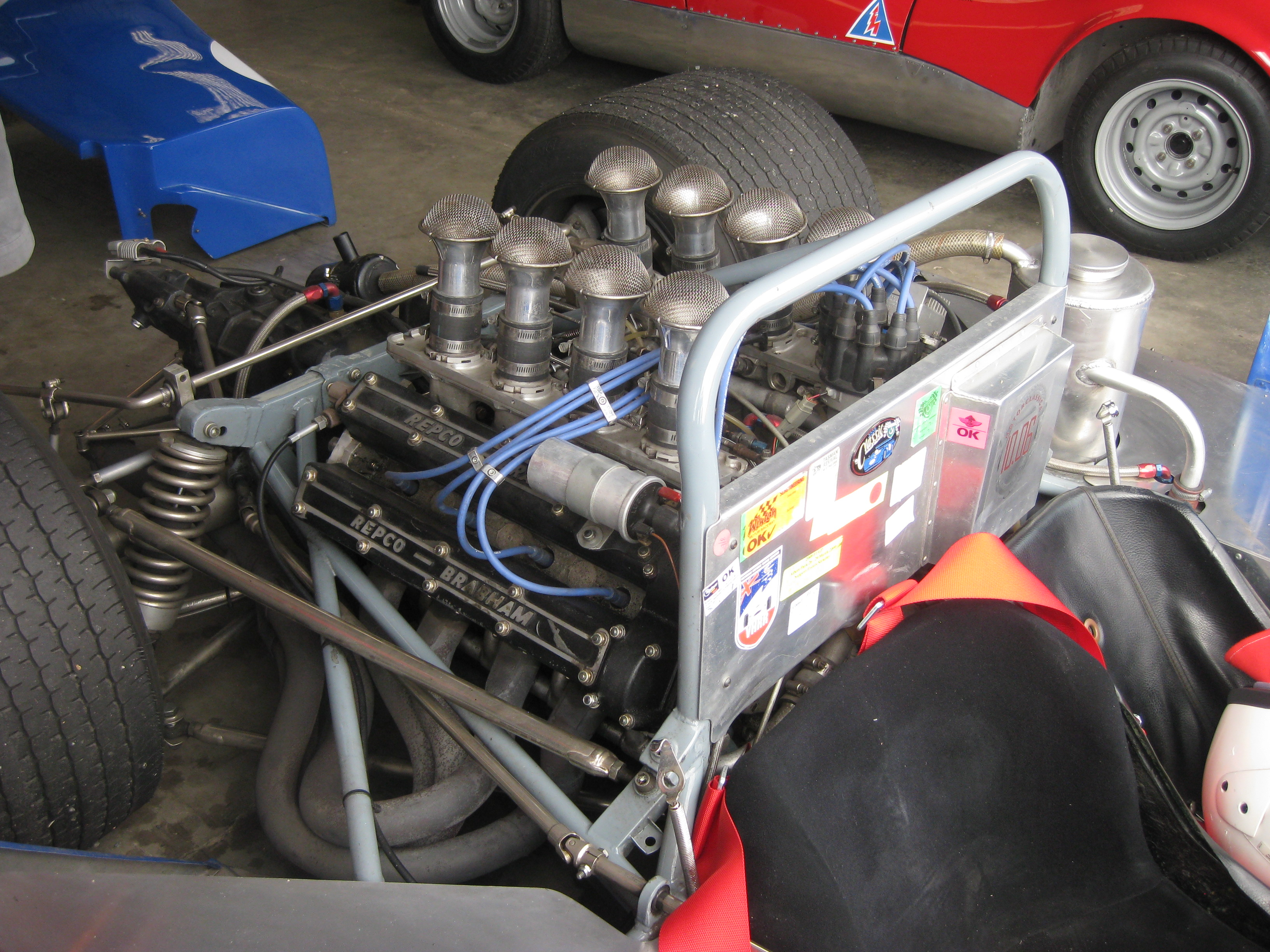
Repco-Brabham RB760 5-litre quad cam V8 engine in the Matich SR4 in 2012

== SR4B / SR5 ==
The SR4B was a sports racing car of circa 1969 which was powered by a Lotus Twin Cam engine. In 1970 it was revised, renamed as the Matich SR5 and fitted with a Waggott 2.0-litre powerplant.

== A50 / A51 / A52 / A53 ==
Matich A50 / A51 / A52 / A53
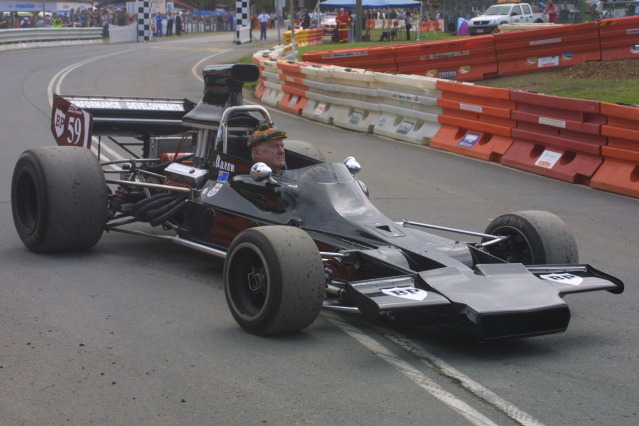
- Matich A50 at the Speed on Tweed in 2007.
- Category: Australian Formula 1 / Formula 5000
- Constructor: Commonwealth Aircraft Corporation
- Designers: Frank Matich; Henry Nehrybecki

Technical specifications
- Chassis: Aluminium and Titanium monocoque
- Suspension (front): Independent with upper and lower wishbones and inclined coil spring/shock units
- Suspension (rear): Independent with single upper link and radius rod, twin tower links and radius rod, inclined coil spring/shock units
- Axle track: Front: 1,549 mm (61.0 in); Rear: 1,625 mm (64.0 in)
- Wheelbase: 2,610 mm (103 in)
- Engine: Repco-Holden, Ford 4,998 cc (305.0 cu in), (Repco Holden) 90° V8, NA, mid-engine, longitudinally mounted
- Transmission: Hewland DG300 5-Speed manual
- Weight: 625 kg (1,378 lb)
- Tyres: Goodyear

Competition history
- Notable drivers: (Australia) Frank Matich (Australia) John Goss (New Zealand) Jim Richards (Australia) Johnnie Walker
- Debut: 1971 Australian Grand Prix (A50)

=== A50 ===
Following the adoption of Formula 5000 regulations into Australian Formula 1 in 1971, Matich and Nehrybecki produced the Matich A50, the first single seater to wear the Matich name. The A50 was designed as a replacement for Frank Matich's successful McLaren M10B (Frank Matich had taken over development from McLaren of the M10B for F5000 racing in 1970 and dubbed it the M10C). Designed on a modular basis with separate front suspension, cockpit and rear end, the car was powered by a 5.0 L Repco Holden V8 engine. Matich drove an A50 to victory in the car's first race, the 1971 Australian Grand Prix at Warwick Farm after qualifying on pole position. Just three months after his 1971 AGP success, Matich qualified the A50 on pole for the 1972 Australian Grand Prix at Sandown and led early before retiring with scavenge pump failure on lap 5. Frank Matich then went on to win the 1972 Australian Drivers' Championship at the wheel of his A50. A total of four A50s were built during this period.

Power output of the Repco-Holden engine around this time was approximately 470 bhp (350 kW; 477 PS)

=== A51 ===
2 new Matich A51s chassis 005 and 006 was constructed for Matich to contest the 1973 L&M Championship in the United States. Chassis 005 was used by Lella Lombardi in 2 races in 1974 and was later sold to John Goss who rebuilt it as an A53 and used it to win the 1976 Australian Grand Prix. Chassis 006 was modified and became the A52.

=== A52 ===
Matich built a revised car, the Matich A52, using A51-006 monocoque for the 1973 Australian Drivers' Championship. The A52 had side radiators, a shorter wheelbase, shorter nose and updated suspension. After just a single race, Matich withdrew from the championship and put his cars up for sale. It was later wrecked in a testing accident.

=== A53 ===
The Matich A53 was raced by Matich in the 1974 Tasman Series after which he retired from racing. The car was then sold to John Goss who finished 9th in the 1974 Australian Drivers' Championship. It failed to start the 1974 Australian Grand Prix at Oran Park due to engine failure. Goss then used the A53 to finish 13th in the 1975 Australian Drivers' Championship before poor visibility in the wet conditions and a rough engine caused his retirement in the 1975 Australian Grand Prix at Surfers Paradise.

Goss drove the car to 5th in the 1976 Rothmans International Series and then finished 6th in the 1976 Australian Drivers' Championship thanks to his Round 1 victory in the 1976 Australian Grand Prix at Sandown in Melbourne, Goss becoming the only driver to have won both the Bathurst 1000 and Australian Grand Prix in the process. Goss drove the A53-Repco to another 5th in the 1977 Rothmans International Series and 3rd in the 1977 Australian Grand Prix at Oran Park.

Goss' win in the 1976 Australian Grand Prix has so far proven to be the last time the race was won by an Australian designed, built and powered car, giving the Matich A53 a special place in Australia's motor racing history. Note that the Ralt cars that won the 1981-1984 Australian Grand Prix's were designed and built in England, despite Ralt having its origins in Australia in the 1950s,

Late in 1977, Goss, staying true to his touring, sports car/sedan ties, decided to replace the successful, but ageing Repco Holden V8 engine with a 4.9 L Ford engine. However, the Ford engine provided less power and ultimately proved uncompetitive compared to the Repco and, after Goss sold the car to Mel McEwin, it was replaced by another Repco-Holden unit.

During its competition life the Matich A50-53's Repco-Holden power output was rated around 500 bhp (373 kW; 507 PS).

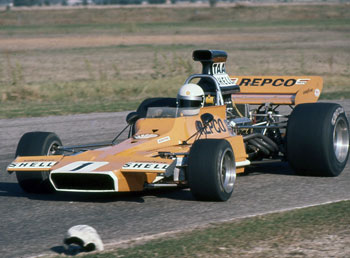
The Matich A50 of Frank Matich at the Surfers Paradise round of the 1972 Australian Drivers' Championship
