= Elfin Clubman =

Elfin Clubman may refer to one of three automobiles:

- Elfin Clubman, produced by Elfin Sports Cars from 1961 to 1965
- Elfin MS8 Clubman, produced by Elfin Sports Cars from 2006
- Elfin Type 3 Clubman, 1998 to 2007
