= McLaren LT170 =

Sports prototype racing car

- Category: Group A Sports Cars
- Constructor: McLaren
- Predecessor: McLaren M6B / Lola T70

Technical specifications
- Engine: Chevrolet 16-valve, OHV V8, naturally-aspirated, mid-mounted

Competition history
- Notable drivers: Howie Sangster

The McLaren LT170 was a sports prototype racing car, built in 1971. The LT170 was a hybrid of the Lola T70 and McLaren M6B Can-Am cars, and used a Chevrolet V8 engine. One car was built, which Howie Sangster used on the way to winning the 1972 Western Australia Sports Car Championship.

== Racing history ==
Part way through the 1971 Australian Sports Car Championship (ASCC), Pinocchio's Racing Team built a hybrid of the Lola T70 and McLaren M6B Can-Am sports prototypes, and christened the resulting car as the McLaren LT170. The car wore the customer version of the M6 McLaren bodywork, known as the M12. It made its debut in the third round of the series, held at Wanneroo Park, in the hands of Howie Sangster, who took second place and the fastest lap, finishing right behind John Harvey's conventional McLaren M6B. In conjunction with another second earlier in the season with a Matich SR3, Sangster took third in the driver's standings, with 12 points.

Sangster drove the car to victory in the 1972 Western Australian Sports Car Championship, which was also the Wanneroo Park round of the 1972 Australian Sports Car Championship. He finished almost a minute ahead of Stuart Kostera's Matich SR3. He entered the Wanneroo Park round of the 1973 Australian Sports Car Championship as well, but retired from the race.

Bill Maddocks contested the Adelaide round of the 1974 Australian Sports Car Championship with the LT170 and also competed in the final round at Symmons Plains. Maddocks continued to race the car in 1975.
