= Brabham BT43 =

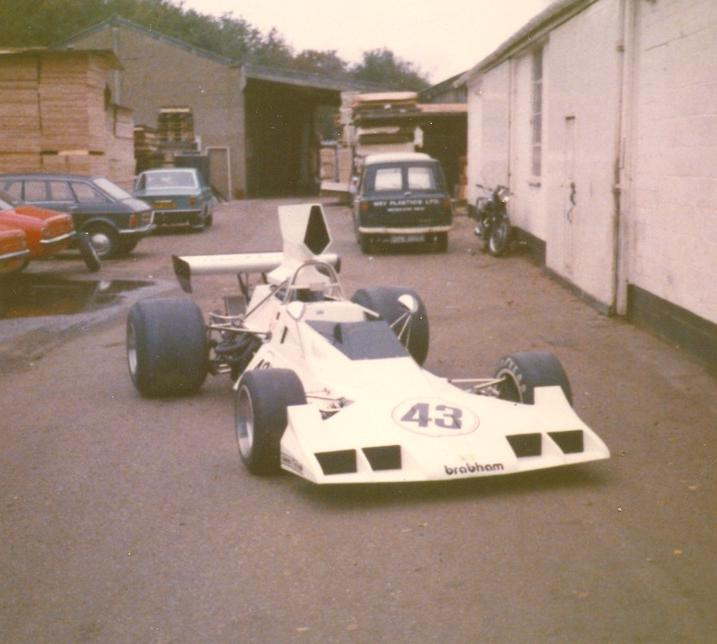
- Photograph of Brabham BT43 F5000 car taken by Bob Paton on debut in 1973 shown outside Motor Racing Developments Weylock Works, New Haw, Surrey UK
- Category: Formula 5000
- Constructor: Motor Racing Developments
- Designer: Geoff Ferris

Technical specifications
- Chassis: Aluminium monocoque with diffused Steel and Aluminium fittings. Non-load bearing engine in fabrication between monocoque and transmission.
- Suspension (front): Independent, upper asymmetric wishbone, upper mid mounted tubular anti-roll bar, mid mounted rack and pinion steering rack, lower symmetric wishbone, inclined coil spring/shock absorber units, outboard ventilated disc brakes, 13 x 10 wheels
- Suspension (rear): Independent, high mounted tubular anti-roll bar, upper and lower trailing arms with single upper link and reversed lower "A" arms, inclined coil spring/shock absorber units, inboard ventilated disc brakes, 13 x 17 wheels
- Axle track: Front: 56.0 in (1,420 mm); Rear: 60.0 in (1,520 mm)
- Wheelbase: 99.5 in (2,530 mm)
- Engine: mid-engine, longitudinally mounted, 4,940 cc (301.5 cu in), Chevrolet, 90° V8, NA
- Transmission: Hewland DG300 5 Speed and Reverse Transaxle manual transmission LG Cam and Pawl or Salisbury type differential
- Weight: 612 kg (1,349 lb)
- Fuel: 25 Gallon
- Tyres: Goodyear, Firestone, or Dunlop

Competition history
- Notable entrants: Adlards Crowne Racing; Adlards; Chuck Jones; Shellsport; Roadstar NSW; Thompsons Motor Auctions; Nine Wide World of Sports
- Notable drivers: (Republic of Ireland) Martin Birrane (United States) Brett Lunger (United Kingdom) Chris Craft (Australia) Kevin Bartlett (Australia) Colin Bond
- Debut: 1974

The Brabham BT43 was the only Formula 5000 racing car built by Motor Racing Developments (MRD). Initiated by Ron Tauranac, designed by Geoff Ferris, and built by a team including Nick Goozee (monocoque) and Bob Paton (construction), it was one of the last cars produced by MRD before MRD was closed by the then new Brabham owner Bernie Ecclestone. Based on the Formula Two Brabham BT40 (which was also designed by Geoff Ferris) the BT43 featured a modified monocoque that incorporated the triangular cross section pioneered by the Brabham BT42 Formula One car which was designed by Gordon Murray. This distinctive pyramid shape not only kept the aerodynamic "stagnation point" low but also neatly allowed the incorporation of a "crushable structure" as required by the 1973 regulations which specified that all fuel tanks were to be protected by deformable structures. Engine and gearbox were the then de facto F5000 standard combination of a Chevrolet 302 cubic inch engine in an unstressed mounting and a Hewland DG300 gearbox. The fitment of these into what was a relatively small Formula Two sized car presented some design challenges. Front suspension components were BT40 while rear suspension components were a combination of Formula One and BT40.

Rolled out in October 1973 and photographed by renowned motoring photographer David Phipps; the BT43 was initially tested at Silverstone by John Watson. This initial testing revealed a distinct lack of front end downforce.

== Racing history ==
=== 1974 ===
Owing to a combination of factors (not the least of which was the closing down of the MRD side of the Brabham business) the BT43 did not make its debut until June 30, 1974, at round 10 of the 1974 Rothmans F5000 Championship at Monza driven by Martin Birrane. Qualifying 15th in a field of 19 Birrane failed to finish retiring the car on lap 16. Birrane drove the car twice more: round 11 at Mallory Park on July 14, 1974, where he did not qualify; and round 13 at Thruxton on August 18, 1974, qualifying 15th in a field of 19 but again failed to finish retiring the car. This was to be Birrane's last appearance in the car as at the next round (round 14) at Brands Hatch on August 26, 1974, American Brett Lunger drove the car. Qualifying an impressive 7th out of a field of 21 on the Brands Hatch short circuit Lunger unfortunately had an accident on lap 28 of the scheduled 60 laps and retired the car. The BT43 did not make a further appearance in 1974 until the last round (round 18) of the 1974 Championship again at Brands Hatch but this time on the Grand Prix circuit with Chris Craft in the cockpit. Qualifying 13th out of a field of 25 Craft finally registered a result for the BT43 by finishing 7th completing 34 laps one lap down on the final round winner Australian Vern Schuppan driving a Chevron B24/28 for Team VDS. Double points for this final round helped to boost Craft's personal points tally in the series to 67 to finish equal ninth with compatriot Brian Redman.

=== 1975 ===
Round 1 of the 1975 Rothmans F5000 Championship at Brands Hatch on March 15, 1975, on the Grand Prix circuit saw Brett Lunger return to driving the BT43. Qualifying 15th in a field of 21 Lunger unfortunately had an accident on the warm-up lap and failed to start the race. The car did not appear again until round 4 at Silverstone on April 12, 1975, again in the hands of Lunger but this time sporting a new nose taken from a BT42. (This is possibly one source of the BT43 being erroneously described in some publications as a modified Formula One car rather than a purpose built and unique F5000). Qualifying 10th out of a field of 21, Lunger again failed to finish retiring on lap 12 of the scheduled 25 laps. The car made no further appearances in the 1975 Rothmans F5000 Championship.

Following its purchase by Chuck Jones in the USA the BT43's next appearance in 1975 was to be at the California Grand Prix which was round 9 of the 1975 US F5000 Championship at Riverside on October 26, 1975. With Jones as the entrant the BT43 was to be driven by Dick Parsons. However the car failed to arrive having been crashed by Parsons in testing. Records of what happened to the car after this and who and where it was repaired are non-existent.

=== 1976 ===
In late 1976 Australian racing driver Kevin Bartlett became aware of the car whilst in the US and tested it at Willow Springs. Impressed by it, he began negotiations to acquire it with the intention of using it in the 1977 Rothmans International Series in Australia. However an agreement was unable to be reached in time for the 1977 series.

=== 1977 ===
The repaired car's next appearance (sporting a new nose) was not in a race but in a motion picture as it was used in the filming of "The Betsy" during 1977. The car was the open wheel race car of the racing driver character named Angelo Perino played by a youthful Tommy Lee Jones.

=== 1978 ===
Following the conclusion of negotiations between Jones and Bartlett, the BT43 arrived in Australia in early January 1978 to participate in the 1978 Rothmans International Series. In a series dominated by Australian driver Warwick Brown driving a Team VDS Lola T332C with four wins from four starts; Bartlett in the BT43 could not manage a points finish, with sequential results of Retired, 8th, 15th, and Retired.

The first round of the 1978 Australian Drivers' Championship at Oran Park on July 30, 1978, proved to be more successful for Bartlett, with a second-place finish behind the McLaren M23-Leyland of John McCormack. This proved to be the highest placing achieved by the BT43 in its career. A distant 5th-place finish in the 1978 Australian Grand Prix at Sandown on September 10, 1978, which formed the second round of the 1978 Australian Drivers' Championship, kept Bartlett in, with a chance of taking the title. The third and final round of the series was run over two heats at Calder on October 15, 1978. However, no points at the final round meant that Bartlett finished the series in a distant third place on 8 points behind the winner Graham McRae in his McRae GM3 on 20 points and second-placed John McCormack in his McLaren M23-Leyland on 12 points.

=== 1979 ===
For the 1979 Rothmans International Series the BT43 was handed over to Colin Bond to drive with Bartlett reverting to his Lola T400. Bond had two points finishes with a 9th at the second round at Adelaide International Raceway on February 11, 1979 and a 4th at the fourth and final round at Oran Park on February 25, 1979. With additional points being awarded for the final round compared with the first three rounds, Bond's points tally was boosted to 14 points which meant he finished the series in a relatively flattering sixth place. Bartlett by comparison finished a lowly fifteenth on 7 points.

With the first round of the 1979 Australian Drivers' Championship also being the 1979 Australian Grand Prix held at Wanneroo Park on March 11, 1979 – only a fortnight after the final round of the 1979 Rothmans International Series – neither Bartlett or Bond made the trip across the continent to contest the Grand Prix.

When the BT43 made its next appearance at the second round of the 1979 Australian Drivers' Championship at Oran Park on July 29, 1979, two factors were evident. The first was dramatic modifications to the car primarily to cure the chronic lack of front end downforce exhibited since initial testing and in Bartlett's words its "unhealthy transition to spectacular oversteer"; while the second was the sponsorship of Bartlett's racing activities by Kerry Packer's Channel 9 television network. Modifications included: a new nose (similar to that of the Lola T400); removal of the nose-mounted radiators and replacement with two new radiators mounted on the end of each upper side of the pyramidic monocoque; and the change in livery. All of these changes were for nothing however as owing to an engine issue during practice the car failed to start the race. The third and final round of the 1979 Australian Drivers' Championship at Sandown Park on September 9, 1979, proved to be the BT43's final race. One further modification to the car was the addition of a new airbox which again was similar to that fitted to a Lola. Bartlett had taken a deposit on the car and raced it for its new owner. Bartlett was in second place early in the race – ahead of eventual second place getter and series winner Johnnie Walker driving a Lola T332 – and entering the bridge turn Bartlett had the centre of the right rear wheel collapse sending the BT43 into the catch fences breaking Bartlett's leg and arm and significantly damaging the BT43.

== Mystery of whereabouts and confirmation of demise ==
Whilst Bartlett was convalescing, Customs demanded that the duty be paid on the car or that it be exported. The prospective owner who had paid the deposit then sent the car "freight on" to a friend in the UK who refused to pay the bill. At this point in time (late 1979) all trace of the car disappeared and it was assumed that either the UK Customs or the freight forwarder had disposed of the car at the docks.

Questions over the BT43's whereabouts were raised in a thread on The Nostalgia Forum on the Autosport website on October 12, 2004, and it was not until September 17, 2013, that the mystery of its demise was confirmed by a post in the same thread.

== Racing record ==
=== 1974 Rothmans 5000 European Championship results ===
Points Awarded 20-15-12-10-8-6-4-3-2-1 for the top 10 places with double points for the final round
(key) (Results in bold indicate pole position; results in italics indicate fastest lap.)

Year	Entrant	Engine	Tyres	Drivers	1	2	3	4	5	6	7	8	9	10	11	12	13	14	15	16	17	18	DP	CP
1974	Adlards Crowne Racing	Chevrolet; 302.0 cu in V8	**F**		BRH	MAL	SIL	OUL	BRH	ZOL	THR	ZAN	MUG	MNZ	MAL	MON	THR	BRH	OUL	SNE	MAL	BRH	**8**	**8**
1974	Adlards Crowne Racing	Chevrolet; 302.0 cu in V8	**F**	(Republic of Ireland) Martin Birrane										Ret	DNQ		Ret						**8**	**8**
1974	Adlards Crowne Racing	Chevrolet; 302.0 cu in V8	**F**	(United States) Brett Lunger														Ret					**8**	**8**
1974	Adlards Crowne Racing	Chevrolet; 302.0 cu in V8	**F**	(United Kingdom) Chris Craft																		7	**8**	**8**

=== 1975 ShellSPORT 5000 European Championship results ===
Points Awarded 20-15-12-10-8-6-4-3-2-1 for the top 10 places with double points for the final round
(key) (Results in bold indicate pole position; results in italics indicate fastest lap.)

Year	Entrant	Engine	Tyres	Drivers	1	2	3	4	5	6	7	8	9	10	11	12	13	14	15	16	DP	CP
1975	Adlards	Chevrolet; 302.0 cu in V8	**F**		BRH	OUL	BRH	SIL	ZOL	ZAN	THR	SNE	MAL	THR	BRH	OUL	SIL	SNE	MAL	BRH	-	-
1975	Adlards	Chevrolet; 302.0 cu in V8	**F**	(United States) Brett Lunger	DNS			Ret													-	-

=== 1975 SCCA/USAC Formula 5000 Championship results ===
Points awarded
(key) (Results in bold indicate pole position; results in italics indicate fastest lap.)

Year	Entrant	Engine	Tyres	Drivers	1	2	3	4	5	6	7	8	9	DP	CP
1975	Chuck Jones	Chevrolet; 302.0 cu in V8	**G**		POC	MOS	WGL	ROA	MOH	ATL	LBH	LAG	RIV	-	-
1975	Chuck Jones	Chevrolet; 302.0 cu in V8	**G**	(United Kingdom) Dick Parsons									DNA	-	-

=== Rothmans International Series results ===
1978 points awarded on a 9-6-4-3-2-1 basis for the first six places at each round.
1979 points awarded on a 10-9-8-7-6-5-4-3-2-1 basis for the first ten places at each of the first three rounds and on a 15-14-13-12-11-10-9-8-7-6-5-4-3-2-1 basis for the first fifteen places at the fourth round.
(key) (Results in bold indicate pole position; results in italics indicate fastest lap.)

Year	Entrant	Engine	Tyres	Drivers	1	2	3	4	DP	CP
1978	Shellsport	Chevrolet; 302.0 cu in V8	**D**		SAN	AIR	SPI	OPR	-	-
1978	Shellsport	Chevrolet; 302.0 cu in V8	**D**	(Australia) Kevin Bartlett	Ret	8	15	Ret	-	-
1979	Thompsons Motor Auctions	Chevrolet; 302.0 cu in V8	**D**		SAN	AIR	SPI	OPR	**12**	**12**
1979	Thompsons Motor Auctions	Chevrolet; 302.0 cu in V8	**D**	(Australia) Colin Bond	Ret	NC	Ret	4	**12**	**12**

=== Australian Drivers Championship results ===
1978 Championship points were awarded on a 9-6-4-3-2-1 basis to the first six place-getters at each round.
Where a round was contested in two heats, points were allocated on a 20-16-13-11-10-9-8-7-6-5-4-3-2-1 basis to the first 14 place-getters in each heat. The six drivers attaining the highest aggregate from both heats were then awarded the championship points for that round. Where more than one driver attained the same total, the relevant placing was awarded to the driver who was higher placed in the last heat.
1979 Championship points were awarded on a 9-6-4-3-2-1 basis to the first six placegetters in each race.
(key) (Results in bold indicate pole position; results in italics indicate fastest lap.)

Year	Entrant	Engine	Tyres	Drivers	1	2	3	DP	CP
1978	Roadstar NSW	Chevrolet; 302.0 cu in V8	**G**		OPR	SAN	CAL	**8**	**8**
1978	Roadstar NSW	Chevrolet; 302.0 cu in V8	**G**	(Australia) Kevin Bartlett	2	5	Ret	**8**	**8**
1979	Nine Wide World of Sports	Chevrolet; 302.0 cu in V8	**D**		WAN	OPR	SAN	-	-
1979	Nine Wide World of Sports	Chevrolet; 302.0 cu in V8	**D**	(Australia) Kevin Bartlett		DNS	Ret	-	-

=== Non Championship Australian results ===
Year	Entrant	Engine	Tyres	Drivers	Rose City 10000
1978	Roadstar NSW	Chevrolet; 302.0 cu in V8	**G**		WIN
1978	Roadstar NSW	Chevrolet; 302.0 cu in V8	**G**	(Australia) Kevin Bartlett	3
