= Clubman =

Clubman may refer to:

- Clubman (racing car class)
- BL Mini Clubman, a small car produced by British Leyland from 1969 to 1980
- British Rail Class 168 Clubman, a diesel multiple-unit train
- Clubman TT, a motorcycle sport event in the Isle of Man from 1947 to 1956
- Elfin Clubman and Elfin Type 5 Clubman, sports cars produced by Elfin Sports Cars
- Elfin MS8 Clubman, a sports car produced by Elfin Sports Cars from 2006
- Mini Clubman (2007), a small car produced by BMW under the Mini brand from 2007
- Morris Mini Clubman, the Australian version of the BL Mini Clubman
- One of the clubmen, members of local defence groups in the English Civil War
