= 1971 Australian Sports Car Championship =

Seasons
- ← 1970 1972 →

The 1971 Australian Sports Car Championship was a CAMS sanctioned Australian motor racing title for drivers of Group A Sports Cars, Group B Improved Production Sports Cars and Group D Series Production Sports Cars. The title, which was the third Australian Sports Car Championship, was won by John Harvey driving a McLaren M6 Repco.

== Schedule ==
The championship was contested over a four heat series.

Heat	Heat name	Circuit	Date	Winning driver	Car
1	Endeavour Cup	Phillip Island	31 January	Lionel Ayers	MRC MkII Repco
2	RAC Trophy	Warwick Farm	2 May	John Harvey	McLaren M6 Repco
3	Western Australian Sports Car Championship	Wanneroo Park	15 August	John Harvey	McLaren M6 Repco
4		Mallala Race Circuit	14 November	John Harvey	McLaren M6 Repco

== Points system ==
Championship points were awarded on a 9-6-4-3-2-1 basis to the first six placegetters at each heat.

== Championship standings ==
Position	Driver	No.	Car	Entrant	Phi	War	Wan	Mal	Total
1	John Harvey	3, 76 & 71	McLaren M6 Repco	Bob Jane Racing	-	9	9	9	27
2	Lionel Ayers	1	MRC MkII Repco	Lionel Ayers	9	6	3	6	24
3	Howie Sangster	2	Matich SR3 Repco; McLaren LT170 Traco Chevrolet	Pinocchio's Racing Team	6	-	6	-	12
4	Alan Hamilton	12	Porsche 906	Porsche Distributors Racing	4	4	-	-	8
5	Phillip Moore	6	Elfin 300C; Elfin 360 Repco	Phillip Moore	3	-	-	4	7
6	Doug Macarthur	7	Rennmax BMW; Rennmax Repco	Doug Macarthur	-	2	-	3	5
7	Henry Michell	61	Elfin 360	Henry Michell	-	-	4	-	4
8	Stan Keen	8	Elfin 400 Ford	Stan Keen Motors	-	3	-	-	3
9	Ken Hastings	13	Elfin 400 Repco	Clive Millis Motors Pty Ltd	2	-	-	-	2
9	Stan Starcevich	5	Bob Jane Graduate	Stan Starcevich	-	-	2	-	2
9	Eric Boord	60	Olympus Ford	Shell Racing Team	-	-	-	2	2
12	Dennis Urhane	25	Elfin 300	Dennis Urhane	1	-	-	-	1
12	Ian Hindmarsh		Elfin BMC	Ian Hindmarsh Motors	-	1	-	-	1
12	Chris Royston	71	Lotus 47		-	-	1	-	1
12	Jim Doig	39	Lotus 7	Motorlab Racing	-	-	-	1	1
