= 1978 Australian Drivers' Championship =

Motor racing competition

Seasons
- ← 1977 1979 →

The 1978 Australian Drivers' Championship was a CAMS sanctioned Australian motor racing title open to Racing Cars complying with Australian Formula 1. It was the 22nd Australian Drivers' Championship to be awarded by CAMS. The title winner, Graham McRae, was awarded the 1978 CAMS Gold Star.

== Calendar ==
The championship was contested over a three-round series.

| Round | Round name | Circuit | Date | Format | Winner | Car | Report |
| 1 | Australian Gold Star Oran Park | Oran Park | 30 July | One race | John McCormack | McLaren M23 Repco-Leyland | |
| 2 | Australian Grand Prix | Sandown | 10 September | One race | Graham McRae | McRae GM3 Chevrolet | Report |
| 3 | Max Stewart Trophy | Calder | 15 October | Two heats | Graham McRae | McRae GM3 Chevrolet | |

== Points system ==
Championship points were awarded on a 9-6-4-3-2-1 basis to the first six place-getters at each round.

Where a round was contested in two heats, points were allocated on a 20-16-13-11-10-9-8-7-6-5-4-3-2-1 basis to the first 14 place-getters in each heat. The six drivers attaining the highest aggregate from both heats were then awarded the championship points for that round. Where more than one driver attained the same total, the relevant placing was awarded to the driver who was higher placed in the last heat.

== Championship results ==
| Position | Driver | No. | Car | Entrant | Ora | San | Cal | Total |
| 1 | Graham McRae | 2 | McRae GM3 Chevrolet | Thomson Motor Auctions | 2 | 9 | 9 | 20 |
| 2 | John McCormack | 1 | McLaren M23 Repco-Leyland | J McCormack | 9 | - | 3 | 12 |
| 3 | Kevin Bartlett | 3 | Brabham BT43 Chevrolet | Thomson Motor Auctions | 6 | 2 | - | 8 |
| 4 | Terry Hook | 19 | Lola T332 Chevrolet | T Hook | 1 | - | 6 | 7 |
| 5 | Peter Edwards | 21 | Lola T332 Chevrolet | Shellsport | - | 4 | 2 | 6 |
| = | John Briggs | 33 | Matich A51 Repco Holden | John Roberts Motors Pty Ltd | - | 6 | - | 6 |
| 7 | Ian Adams | 18 | Lola T330 Chevrolet | I Adams | - | 1 | 4 | 5 |
| 8 | Garrie Cooper | 12 | Elfin MR8 Chevrolet | Ansett Team Elfin | 4 | - | - | 4 |
| 9 | Peter Middleton | 5 | Elfin MR5 Repco Holden | P Middleton | - | 3 | - | 3 |
| = | John Bowe | | Elfin MR8 | Ansett Team Elfin | 3 | - | - | 3 |
| 11 | Bronwyn Taylor | 14 | Matich A50 Repco Holden | B Taylor | - | - | 1 | 1 |

== Championship name ==
The regulations for the championship were published by the Confederation of Australian Motor Sport under the name Australian Formula 1 Championship, and the Official Souvenir Program for the 1978 Australian Grand Prix listed the race as "Round 2, 1978 Australian Formula One Championship". However it was reported in the Australian Competition Yearbook (Number 8) as the Australian Drivers' Championship and is recognized by CAMS as the 1978 Australian Drivers' Championship and the latter term has been used for this article.
