= Elfin MS8 Streamliner =

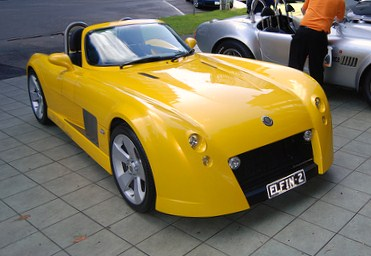

Overview
- Manufacturer: Elfin Cars
- Production: 2006–?
- Designer: Mike Simcoe

Body and chassis
- Class: Sports car (S)
- Body style: 2 seater
- Related: Elfin MS8 Clubman

Powertrain
- Engine: 5.7L V8

Dimensions
- Wheelbase: 2,290 mm (90.2 in)
- Length: 3,500 mm (137.8 in)
- Width: 1,710 mm (67.3 in)
- Curb weight: 1,100 kg (2,425 lb)

The Elfin MS8 Streamliner is a sports car, successor to the Elfin MS7, a Repco-Holden V8 powered sports racing car in which Elfin founder Garrie Cooper won the 1975 Australian Sports Car Championship, and Stuart Kostera won the 1976 Australian Tourist Trophy.

The MS8 was revealed at the 2004 Melbourne International Motor Show.

Sales to the UK were predicted for mid-2007. Two Elfin MS8s were sent to the UK for export evaluation and an office was set up in Chipping Norton, Oxfordshire.

== Design ==
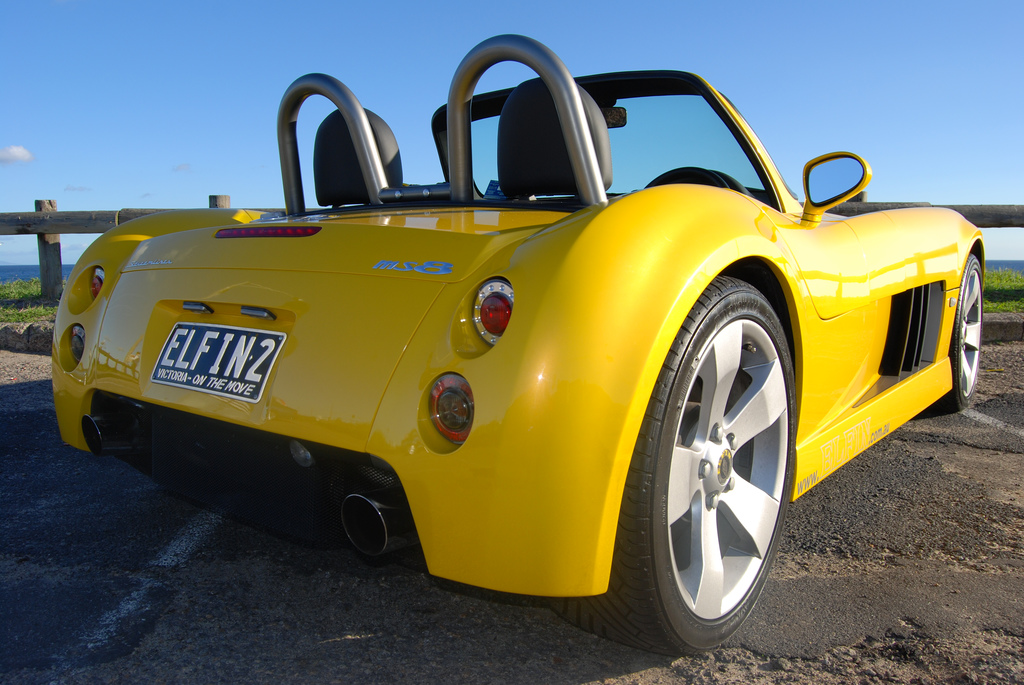
Rear view of the car

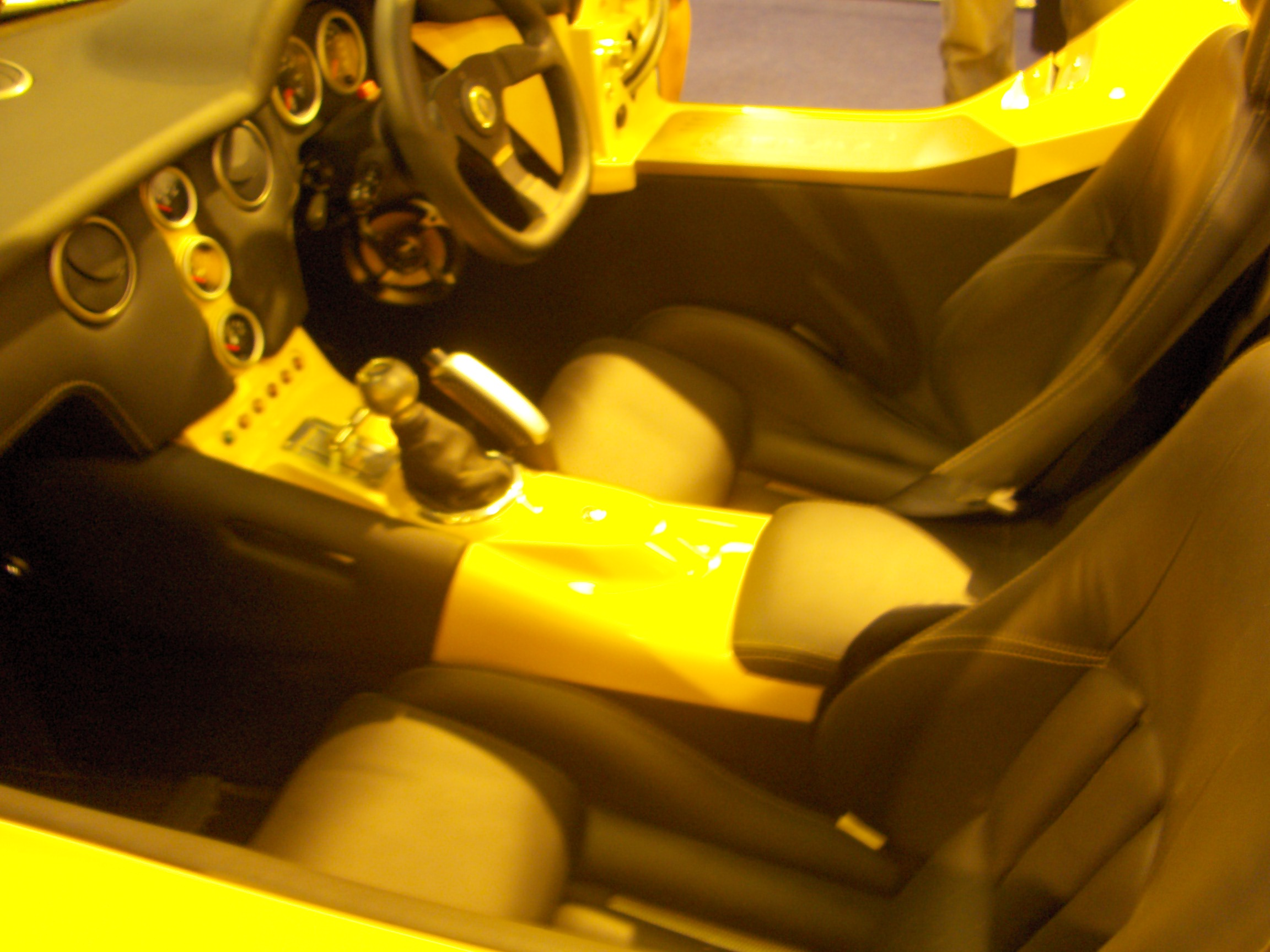
Interior

The Elfin MS8 Streamliner models have been designed by Elfin Sports Cars and styled by the Holden Design team when Mike Simcoe was Styling Director.

On July 5, 2006, Elfin announced that the MS8 Streamliner would be going into production. Problems had surfaced with emissions and noise regulations, which caused problems with the development cycle, but the car would reportedly have the same Holden-derived parts as the concept did. Elfin ceased production of all vehicles in 2012.

== Specification levels ==
There are two specifications for the Streamliner. One is the Roadster version, which is road registerable, and the other is the Racer version, which is a single-seat, track-only version. Sales started in July 2006, with the Streamliner selling for $119,990 (since revised to $99,990) and the Clubman for $98,990 (since revised to $84,990). Elfin claimed production would be limited to just 100 units.

=== Special editions ===
==== 50th Anniversary Streamliner ====
A '50th Anniversary' Streamliner model was planned to be released in a limited run of five cars. The cars are distinguished by a special paint colour of 'Garrie Cooper Gold', a cabin hardtop and bonnet scoop and burgundy trim. The hard top and bonnet scoop were designed by Mike Simcoe, the designer of the cars. One of the cars was planned to be a supercharged version with a V8 engine producing 350 kW (469 hp) and 660 N⋅m (487 lb⋅ft) of torque. The supercharger was provided and fitted by Walkinshaw Performance. Pricing was planned to be $128,500, with the supercharged version being $12,000 extra.

==== 'No Fear' Streamliner ====
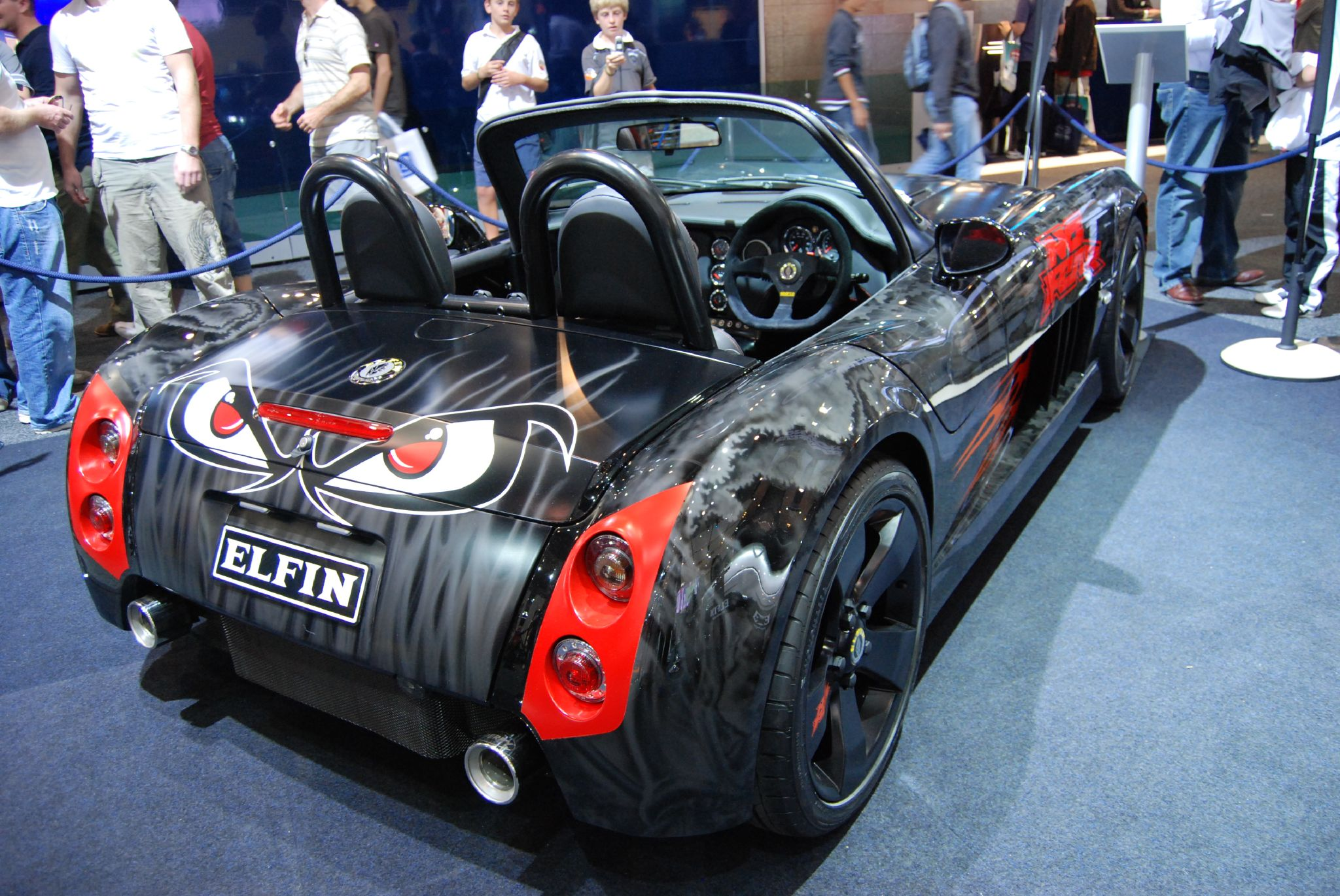
'No Fear' Streamliner rear view

In 2008, Elfin introduced a one-off promotional version of the MS8 Streamliner for the No Fear lifestyle brand whose products are sold exclusively at K-Mart stores throughout Australia. The car, designed by HSV's Adam Dean Smith, was displayed at the 2008 Melbourne International Motor Show and the Australian Grand Prix.

== Performance ==
Top speed: 275 km/h (171 mph)
Standing 400 m (0.25 mi): 13.7 s
0 - 100 km/h (62 mph): 5.3 seconds

== Technical specifications and features ==
=== Drivetrain ===
- 5.7-litre alloy V8 OHV 16 valves
- From 329 hp (245 kW; 334 PS)
- 6-speed gearbox
- Limited-Slip Differential (LSD)

=== Safety ===
- Traction control system
- ABS braking system
- Cruise control

=== Suspension ===
- Fully independent rear suspension with top and bottom wishbones plus toe link adjustment
- Front suspension with top and bottom chrome moly, unequal, aerofoil wishbones
- Fully adjustable race spec rose joints throughout
- Elfin alloy uprights (front and rear), fully adjustable for camber, caster & toe
- Coil over Koni shock absorbers, adjustable for bump, rebound and ride height

=== Brakes ===
- Slotted & ventilated 4 wheel disc brakes Front: 32 x 343 mm (13.5 in) discs
- Elfin alloy billet machined 6 pot calipers Rear: 18 x 315 mm (12.4 in) discs with handbrake
- Elfin alloy billet machined 4 pot calipers

=== Steering/Pedals ===
- Rack and pinion with adjustable steering column
- Fully adjustable alloy pedal box with brake bias adjustment

=== Wheels/Tyres ===
- Alloy 18" wheels
- 235 x 40 tyres

=== Construction ===
- Jig assembled, hand crafted multitubular space frame
- GRP body panels

=== Dimensions ===
- Front Track 1,460 mm (57.5 in)
- Rear Track 1,430 mm (56.3 in)
