= 1972 Australian Sports Car Championship =

Seasons
- ← 1971 1973 →

The 1972 Australian Sports Car Championship was an Australian motor racing series for Sports Cars. It was sanctioned by the Confederation of Australian Motor Sport as a national title and was the fourth Australian Sports Car Championship.

The championship was won by John Harvey driving a McLaren M6 Repco.

== Schedule ==
The championship was contested over six rounds:

Round	Name	Circuit	State	Date	Winning driver	Car
1	The Endeavour Cup	Phillip Island	Victoria	30 January	John Harvey	McLaren M6 Repco
2		Adelaide International Raceway	South Australia	9 April	John Harvey	McLaren M6 Repco
3	RAC Trophy Race	Warwick Farm	New South Wales	30 April	John Harvey	McLaren M6 Repco
4		Surfers Paradise	Queensland	18 June	John Harvey	McLaren M6 Repco
5	Western Australian Sports Car Championship	Wanneroo	Western Australia	20 August	Howie Sangster	McLaren LT170 Chevrolet
6	Tasmanian Sports Car Championship	Symmons Plains	Tasmania	12 November	John Harvey	McLaren M6 Repco

== Classes and points system ==
The championship was open to:

- Group A Sports Cars (Open)
- Group B Sports Cars (Closed)
- Group D Production Sports Cars

Cars competed in two classes, Over 2500cc and Up to 2500cc.

Points were awarded on a 9-6-4-3-2-1 basis to the first six placegetters in each class at each round and on a 4-3-2-1 basis to the first four outright placegetters at each round.

== Championship standings ==
Position	Driver	No.	Car	Entrant	Phi	Ade	War	Sur	Wan	Sym	Total
1	John Harvey	2, 76, 1	McLaren M6 Repco	Bob Jane Racing	13	13	13	13	2	13	67
2	Alan Hamilton	9	Porsche 906	Porsche Distributors	12	12	12	11	-	-	47
3	Phil Moore	6	Elfin 360 Repco	Phil Moore	-	-	8	7	11	12	38
4	Doug Macarthur		Rennmax Repco	Doug Macarthur	8	8	-	-	-	3	19
	Henry Michell	61	Elfin 360 Repco	Henry Michell	5	-	5	4	-	5	19
6	Howie Sangster	20	McLaren LT170 Chevrolet	Shell Racing	-	-	-	-	13	-	13
	Charlie Occhipinti		Elfin ME5 Chevrolet	Monza Motors	-	7	6	-	-	-	13
8	Ray Hanger	4	Rennmax BMW	Ray Hanger	3	4	-	3	-	-	10
9	Stan Keen	21	Elfin 400	Stan Keen Motors	-	-	-	9	-	-	9
	Stuart Kostera	27	Matich SR3	Stuart Kostera	-	-	-	-	9	-	9
11	Bruce Gowans	30	Lotus 23B Cosworth	A Ling	-	-	-	-	-	8	8
12	Chris Royston	47	Lotus 47	Shell Racing	-	-	-	-	6	-	6
	Max Thompson		Elfin 400 Ford	Max Thompson	-	-	-	-	-	6	6
14	Derek Vince	31	Graduate Mk 11	Derek Vince	-	-	-	-	5	-	5
15	Alan Nitschke		Ford Special	Vimy Ridge Service Station	-	4	-	-	-	-	4
	Bill O'Gorman		Matich SR5 Waggott	Bill O'Gorman Racing	-	-	2	-	-	2	4
	Bruce Leer		Milano GT2 Holden	Bruce Leer	-	-	4	-	-	-	4
	Gordon Mitchell	37	Austin-Healey Sprite	Gordon Mitchell	-	-	-	-	4	-	4
	Terry Southall		Elfin 400B Chevrolet	Terry Southall	-	-	-	-	-	4	4
20	Barry Bassingthwaite		Nota Sportsman Ford	Barry Bassingthwaite	-	-	3	-	-	-	3
21	Barry Coleman	55	Bolwell Mk.7	Barry Coleman	-	-	-	-	3	-	3
	Moss Angliss		Milano GT2 Holden	Bruce Leer	-	-	3	-	-	-	3
	Tony McAlinden	36	U2 Mk.8B	Tony McAlinden	-	-	-	-	3	-	3
24	Graeme Ibbotson	48	Jomax	Graeme Ibbotson	-	-	-	-	2	-	2
	Paul Gibson	10	Lotus 23B Ford	Hoot Gibson and Sons	2	-	-	-	-	-	2
26	Brian Cole	38	MG Midget		-	-	-	-	1	-	1
	Keith Murray		Welsor Waggott	Spinning Wheel Tyre Co	-	-	1	-	-	-	1
	Peter Turnbull		Turnham Climax	Peter Turnbull	-	-	-	-	-	1	1
