= 1976 Australian Tourist Trophy =

The 1976 Australian Tourist Trophy was a motor race staged at the Phillip Island circuit in Victoria, Australia on 21 November 1976. It was open to Group A Sports Cars and was recognized by the Confederation of Australian Motor Sport as an Australian national title. The race, which was organised by the Phillip Island Auto Racing Club, was the fourteenth Australian Tourist Trophy. It also carried the Endeavour Cup title.

The race was won by Stuart Kostera of Western Australia, driving an Elfin MS7.

== Results ==
Position	Driver	No.	Car	Entrant	Laps
1	Stuart Kostera	131	Elfin MS7 Repco Holden	Kostera Racing	30
2	Barry Singleton	61	McLaren M8 Chevrolet	Barry Singleton Motors	30
3	Alan Hamilton	9	Porsche 934	Jag Porsche Team	30
4	Rusty French	6	de Tomaso Pantera	Holley Performance	29
5	Geoff Walker	70	GP Datsun Clubman	Geoff Walker	27
6	Tony Rees	78	Farrell Clubman	AG Rees	26
7	Dale Kendall	56	Arbyen WDC1	Dale Kendall	24
DNF	Jim Phillips	3	Rennmax Repco	Shell Sport	
DNF	Eric Boord	19	Boral Ford	Shell Sport	
DNF	John White	18	Bolwell	John White	
DNF	Murray Wilson	35	Clubman	M Wilson	
DNF	Greg Doidge	31	Elfin 360 Repco	GSD Sheetmetal	18
DNF	Ken Walters	49	Gissing Holden	Ken Walters	
DNF	Paul Gibson	11	Rennmax Repco	Shell Sport	
DNF	Geoff Watson	21	Watson Corolla	Geoff Watson	
DNF	Ross Wemyss	4	Farrell	Ross Wemyss	
DNF	Peter Jones	68	Cheetah	Motor Improvements Team Toyota	
DNF	Andrew Newton	59	Hossack 3	Paul Newton	
DNF	Tom Crozier	58	Farrell	T Crozier	
DNF	Max Scorer	7	Scorer Sprite	Max Scorer	
DNF	Kevin Norden	12	Speco Elfin	Kevin Norden	1
DNF	Ian Burrell	17	Rennmax Oldsmobile	Keith Beard	0
DNF	Vic Butler	34	Lotus 23B	VA Butler	0
DNS	Dennis Hogan	37	Triton Mk2	Dennis Hogan	
DNS	John Allison	71	Allison		
DNS	Graham Docker	36	Bolwell	Graham Docker	
DNS	Bernard Bignell	8	Lotus 23B	Bernard Bignell	
DNS	Col Trengrove	46	ASP 340D	Trengrove Racing Cars	
DNS	Paul Trevethan	20	MGB GT V8	Broadwalk Racing Cars	
DNS	Leigh Gribble	82	Grimas	Leigh Gribble	
DNS	Alan Newton	54	R&T Chevrolet	Alan Newton	
DNS	David Phillips	15	Lotus 23	David K Phillips	
DNS	Warwick De Rose	24	Elfin 300	Warwick De Rose	
DNS	G. Stoll	38	FM Corolla	G Stoll	
DNS	Chris Hocking	74	Gordon C2	Motorfast Datsun	

Key:

- DNF = Did not finish
- DNS = Did not start

=== Race statistics ===
- Race distance: 30 laps, 88.2 miles, 141.9 km
- Pole position: Jim Phillips, 1:48.6
- Number of starters: 23
- Number of classified finishers: 7
- Race time of winning car: 57:37.9
- Fastest lap: Jim Phillips, 1:48.8
