= 1978 Australian Tourist Trophy =

The 1978 Australian Tourist Trophy was a motor race staged at the Calder circuit in Victoria, Australia on 3 December 1978. It was open to Group A Sports Cars and was recognized by the Confederation of Australian Motor Sport as an Australian Title. The race, which was the sixteenth Australian Tourist Trophy, was won by Greg Doidge driving an Elfin 360.

== Results ==
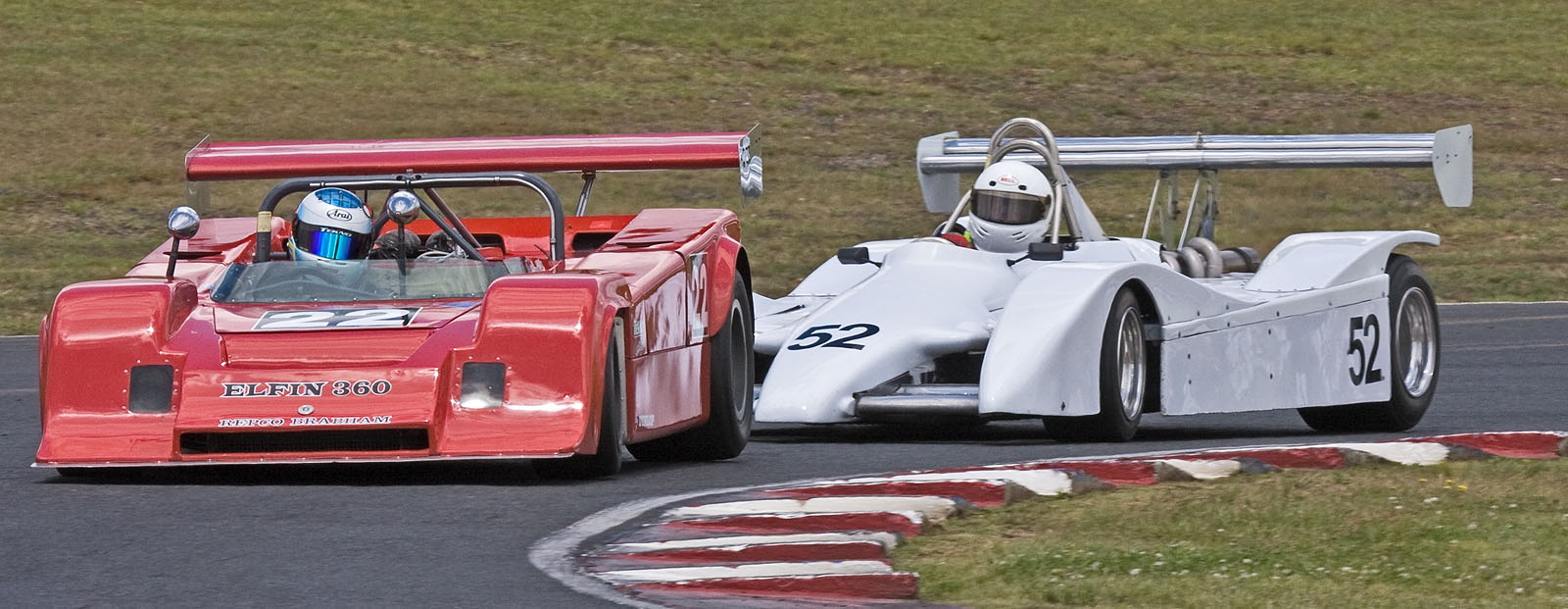
The race winning Elfin 360, pictured in 2008

| Position | Driver | No. | Car | Entrant | Laps |
| 1 | Greg Doidge | | Elfin 360 Repco | Stihl Chain Saws | 50 |
| 2 | Paul Gibson | 3 | Rennmax Repco 5.0 | Shellsport | 50 |
| 3 | Grant Gibson | 11 | Rennmax Repco 3.0 | Shellsport | 49 |
| 4 | Ross Wymss | | Allison Datsun | John Allison | 47 |
| 5 | Peter Jones | | Cheetah Corolla | Motor Improvements | 47 |
| 6 | Derek Fry | | Cheetah Corolla | Tubeframe Australia | 47 |
| 7 | Barry Main | | Bolwell Nagari | Brian Wood Ford | 46 |
| 8 | John Horswell | | Puma Corolla | Wanjay Waste | 44 |
| DNF | Hinrichs | | ? | ? | ? |
| DNF | Walters | | ? | ? | ? |
| DNF | Singleton | | McLaren | ? | ? |
| DNF | Drewer | | ? | ? | ? |
| DNF | Bignall | | Lotus 23B | ? | ? |
| DNF | ? | | ? | ? | ? |
| DNF | ? | | ? | ? | ? |
| DNF | ? | | ? | ? | ? |
| DNF | ? | | ? | ? | ? |
| Disq | Ken Hastings | | Volkswagen Karmann Ghia | ? | ? |

=== Race statistics ===
- Race distance: 50 laps, 50 miles, 80.5 km
- Race time of winning car: 37:28.2
- Number of starters: 18
- Number of finishers: 8
