= Elfin Type 350/360 =

Elfin Type 350 Elfin Type 360

Overview
- Manufacturer: Elfin Sports Cars
- Production: 1970-1975
- Designer: Garrie Cooper

Powertrain
- Engine: Coventry Climax 2.0–2.5 L (120–150 cu in) 16-valve L4 DOHC naturally-aspirated mid-engined Repco-Brabham 2.5–3.5 L (150–210 cu in) 16-valve V8 SOHC naturally-aspirated mid-engined
- Transmission: Hewland FT 200 5-speed manual transaxle

Chronology
- Predecessor: Elfin Type 300

The Elfin T350 and T360 were sports racing cars, designed, developed and built by Australian manufacturer Elfin, which were produced in limited numbers to compete in the Australian Sports Car Championship, between 1970 and 1975. They were powered by 2.0 or 2.5-litre Coventry Climax four-cylinder engines, but were also powered by 2.5 to 3.5-litre Repco-Brabham V8s.
