= 1979 Australian Drivers' Championship =

Motor racing competition

Seasons
- ← 1978 1980 →

A 1979 Australian Drivers' Championship was a CAMS sanctioned national motor racing title for drivers of Australian Formula 1 racing cars. The championship winner was awarded the 1979 CAMS Gold Star. The title, which was the 23rd Australian Drivers' Championship, was won by Johnnie Walker, driving a Lola T332.

== Schedule ==
The championship was contested over a three-round series with one race per round.

Round	Name	Circuit	State	Date	Round winner	Car	Report
1	Australian Grand Prix	Wanneroo Raceway	Western Australia	11 March	Johnnie Walker	Lola T332 Chevrolet	Report
2		Oran Park	New South Wales	29 July	John Bowe	Elfin MR8 Chevrolet	
3	Rothmans 10,000	Sandown	Victoria	9 September	Alfredo Costanzo	Lola T430 Chevrolet	

== Points system ==
Championship points were awarded on a 9-6-4-3-2-1 basis to the first six placegetters in each race.

== Results ==
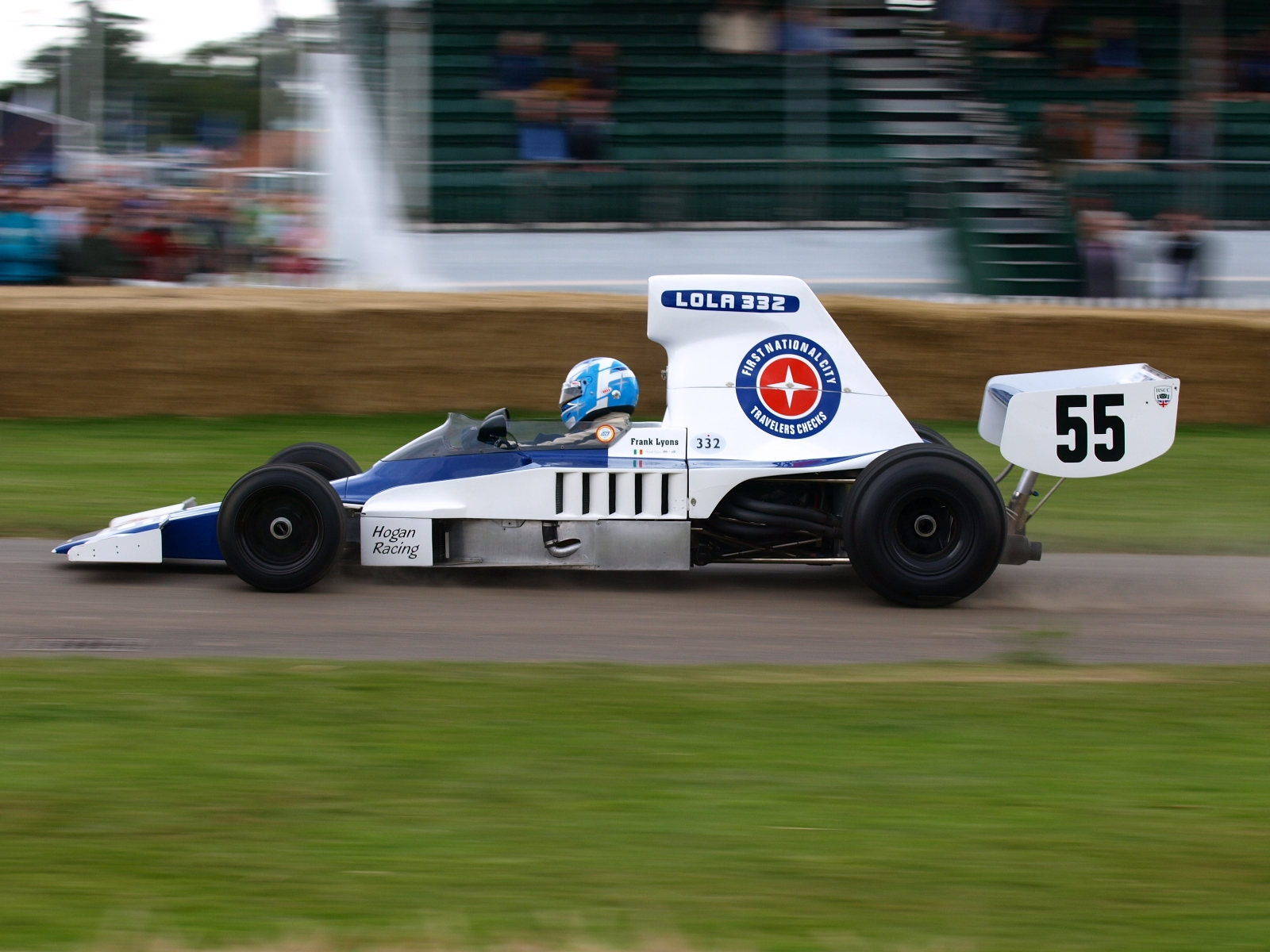
Johnnie Walker won the championship driving a Lola T332, similar to the example pictured above

Position	Driver	No.	Car	Entrant	Wan	Ora	San	Points
1	Johnnie Walker	25	Lola T332 Chevrolet	Magnum Wheels	9	4	6	19
2	John Bowe	11	Elfin MR8 Chevrolet	Ansett Team Elfin	6	9	-	15
3	Alfredo Costanzo	84	Lola T430 Chevrolet	Porsche Cars Australia	-	-	9	9
4	Rob Butcher	10	Lola T332 Chevrolet	Rob Butcher	4	-	4	8
4	John Smith	71	Ralt RT1 Ford	John Smith	3	3	2	8
6	John Wright	76	Lola T400 Chevrolet	John Wright	-	6	-	6
7	Graham McRae	2	McRae GM3	Settlement Road Wreckers	-	-	3	3
8	Chas Talbot	3	Lola T332C	Chas Talbot	-	2	-	2
8	Terry Hook	15	Lola T332 Chevrolet	Terry Hook	2	-	-	2
10	Peter Edwards	21	Lola T332	PJ Edwards	-	-	1	1
10	Paul Hamilton	88	Elfin 600		-	1	-	1
10	Barry Singleton	19	Gardos GL1 Chevrolet	Barry Singleton	1	-	-	1

== Championship name ==
Sources of the time differ as to the actual name of the championship with both Australian Drivers' Championship and Australian Formula 1 Championship being used. "Australian Drivers' Championship" is used by Confederation of Australian Motor Sport in its historic documentation and that term has been used here.
