= 1979 Australian Grand Prix =

- Round 1 of 3 of the 1979 Australian Drivers' Championship

Race details
- Date: 11 March 1979
- Official name: XLIV Australian Grand Prix
- Location: Wanneroo Raceway, Wanneroo, Western Australia
- Course: Permanent racing facility
- Course length: 2.411 km (1.498 miles)
- Distance: 63 laps, 151.893 km (93.374 miles)
- Weather: Sunny

Pole position
Driver	(Australia) Alfredo Costanzo	Lola-Chevrolet
- Time: 0'52.11

Fastest lap
Driver	(Australia) John Wright (Australia) Johnnie Walker	Lola-Chevrolet; Lola-Chevrolet
- Time: 0'54.92

Podium
First	(Australia) Johnnie Walker	Lola-Chevrolet
Second	(Australia) John Bowe	Elfin-Chevrolet
Third	(Australia) Rob Butcher	Lola-Chevrolet

The 1979 Australian Grand Prix was an open-wheel racing car race held at Wanneroo Raceway north of Perth in Western Australia on 11 March 1979.

The race, which was the first round of the 1979 Australian Drivers' Championship, was open to racing cars complying with Australian Formula 1 (incorporating Formula 5000 and Formula Pacific). It was recognised by the Confederation of Australian Motor Sport as the 44th Australian Grand Prix and was the only Australian Grand Prix to be held at the Wanneroo Raceway.

== Classification ==
Results as follows:

=== Qualifying ===
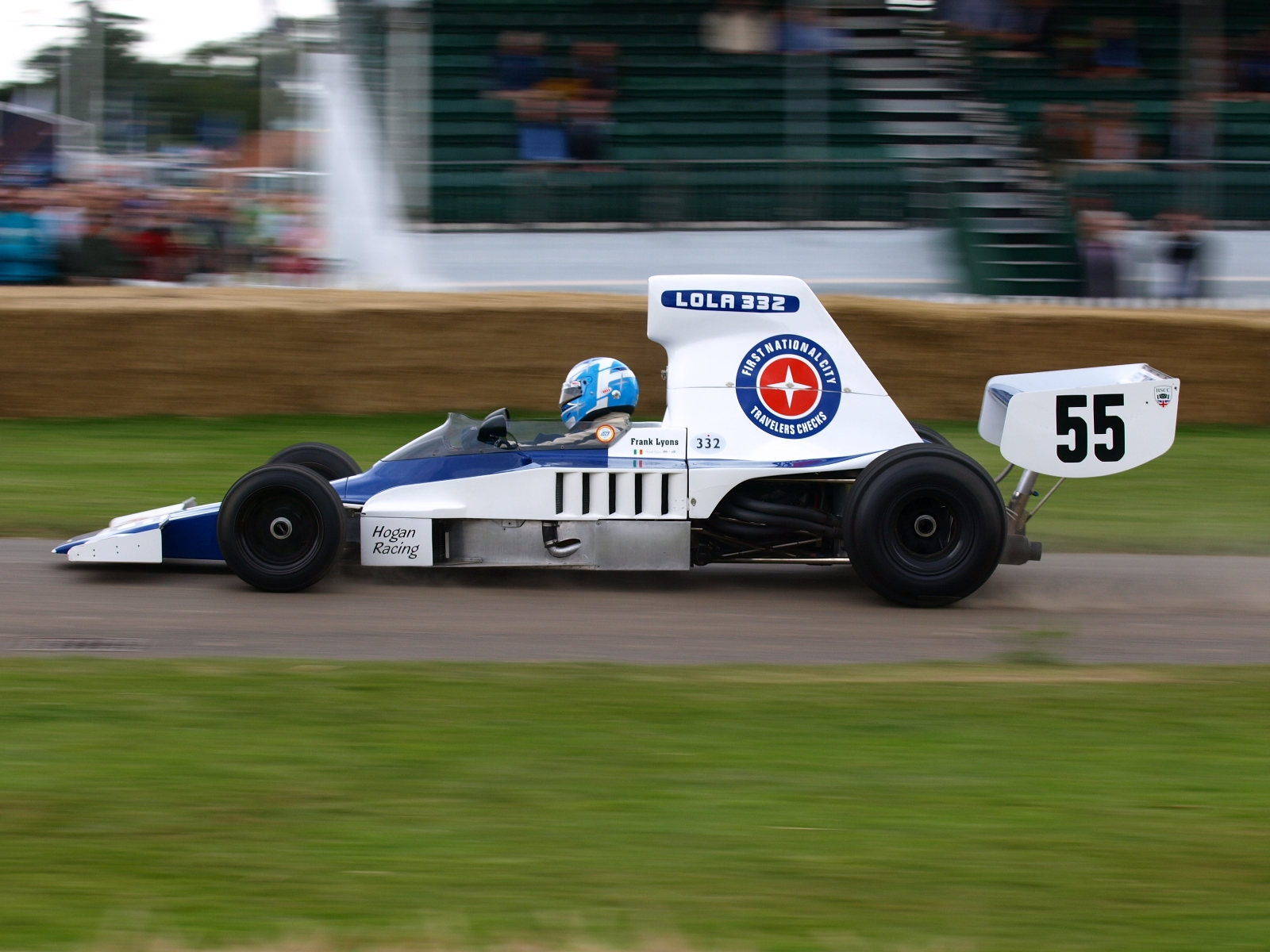
John Walker won the race driving a Lola T332, similar to that pictured above

Pos	No	Driver	Car	Entrant	Qual	Gap
1	84	(Australia) Alfredo Costanzo	Lola T430 / Chevrolet 5.0L V8	Alfredo Costanzo	0:52.11	—
2	12	(Australia) Larry Perkins	Elfin MR8 / Chevrolet 5.0L V8	Ansett Team Elfin	0:52.77	+0.66
3	25	(Australia) John Walker	Lola T332 / Chevrolet 5.0L V8	John Walker	0:53.00	+0.89
4	15	(Australia) Terry Hook	Lola T332 / Chevrolet 5.0L V8	Terry Hook	0:53.20	+1.09
5	24	(Australia) Jon Davison	Lola T332 / Chevrolet 5.0L V8	Ranger Truck Rentals	0:54.20	+2.09
6	76	(Australia) John Wright	Lola T400 / Chevrolet 5.0L V8	John Wright	0:54.27	+2.16
7	7	(Australia) John McCormack	McLaren M23 / Leyland 5.0L V8	John McCormack	0:54.67	+2.56
8	11	(Australia) John Bowe	Elfin MR8 / Chevrolet 5.0L V8	Ansett Team Elfin	0:55.30	+3.19
9	10	(Australia) Rob Butcher	Lola T332 / Chevrolet V8	Rob Butcher	0:55.85	+3.74
10	71	(Australia) John Smith	Ralt RT1 / Ford 1.6L I4	John Smith	0:56.59	+4.48
11	38	(Australia) Ivan Tighe	Chevron B37 / Chevrolet 5.0L V8	Ivan Tighe	0:57.11	+5.00
12	30	(Australia) Peter Larner	Chevron B39 / Ford 1.6L I4	Paul England Racing	0:57.30	+5.19
13	19	(Australia) Barry Singleton	Gardos GL1 / Chevrolet 5.0L V8	Barry Singleton	0:58.20	+6.09
14	8	(Australia) Rod Housego	Elfin 622 / Ford 1.6L I4	Rod Housego	1:00.70	+8.59
15	16	(Australia) Bob Creasy	Birrana 273 / Ford 1.6L I4	Bob Creasy	1:01.00	+8.89
16	40	(Australia) Geoff Nicol	Elfin 622 / Ford 1.6L I4	Geoff Nicol	1:01.89	+9.78
17	3	(Australia) Bill Downey	Minos / Ford 1.6L I4	Bill Downey	1:03.35	+11.24
18	17	(Australia) Bob Kingsbury	El Toro / Alfa Romeo 1.6L I4	Bob Kingsbury	1:05.45	+13.34

=== Race ===
Pos	No	Driver	Car	Entrant	Laps	Time
1	25	(Australia) John Walker	Lola T332 / Chevrolet 5.0L V8	John Walker	63	59m 09.72s
2	11	(Australia) John Bowe	Elfin MR8 / Chevrolet 5.0L V8	Ansett Team Elfin	63	59m 22.13s
3	10	(Australia) Rob Butcher	Lola T332 / Chevrolet 5.0L V8	Rob Butcher	61	
4	71	(Australia) John Smith	Ralt RT1 / Ford 1.6L I4	John Smith	61	
5	15	(Australia) Terry Hook	Lola T332 / Chevrolet 5.0L V8	Terry Hook	59	
6	19	(Australia) Barry Singleton	Gardos GL1 / Chevrolet 5.0L V8	Barry Singleton	59	
7	38	(Australia) Ivan Tighe	Chevron B37 / Chevrolet 5.0L V8	Ivan Tighe	49	
8	40	(Australia) Geoff Nicol	Elfin 622 / Ford 1.6L I4	Geoff Nicol	45	
Ret	76	(Australia) John Wright	Lola T400 / Chevrolet 5.0L V8	John Wright	62	Engine
Ret	17	(Australia) Bob Kingsbury	El Toro / Alfa Romeo 1.6L I4	Bob Kingsbury	39	Battery
Ret	7	(Australia) John McCormack	McLaren M23 / Leyland 5.0L V8	John McCormack	36	Gearbox
Ret	8	(Australia) Rod Housego	Elfin 622 / Ford 1.6L I4	Rod Housego	33	Exhaust
Ret	3	(Australia) Bill Downey	Minos / Ford 1.6L I4	Bill Downey	30	Transmission
Ret	24	(Australia) Jon Davison	Lola T332 / Chevrolet 5.0L V8	Ranger Truck Rentals	20	Fuel Pump
Ret	30	(Australia) Peter Larner	Chevron B39 / Ford 1.6L I4	Paul England Racing	8	Brakes / Suspension
Ret	12	(Australia) Larry Perkins	Elfin MR8 / Chevrolet 5.0L V8	Ansett Team Elfin	0	Accident
Ret	84	(Australia) Alfredo Costanzo	Lola T430 / Chevrolet 5.0L V8	Alfredo Costanzo	0	Accident
DNS	16	(Australia) Bob Creasy	Birrana 273 / Ford 1.6L I4	Bob Creasy	0	Gearbox

=== Notes ===
- Pole position: Alfredo Costanzo - 52.11
- Fastest lap: John Wright / John Walker - 54.92, 158.20 km/h (98.30 mph)
- Winner's average speed: 154.20 km/h (95.30 mph)

Preceded by 1978 Australian Grand Prix	Australian Grand Prix; 1979	Succeeded by 1980 Australian Grand Prix
