= McLaren M6A =

Prototype racing automobile

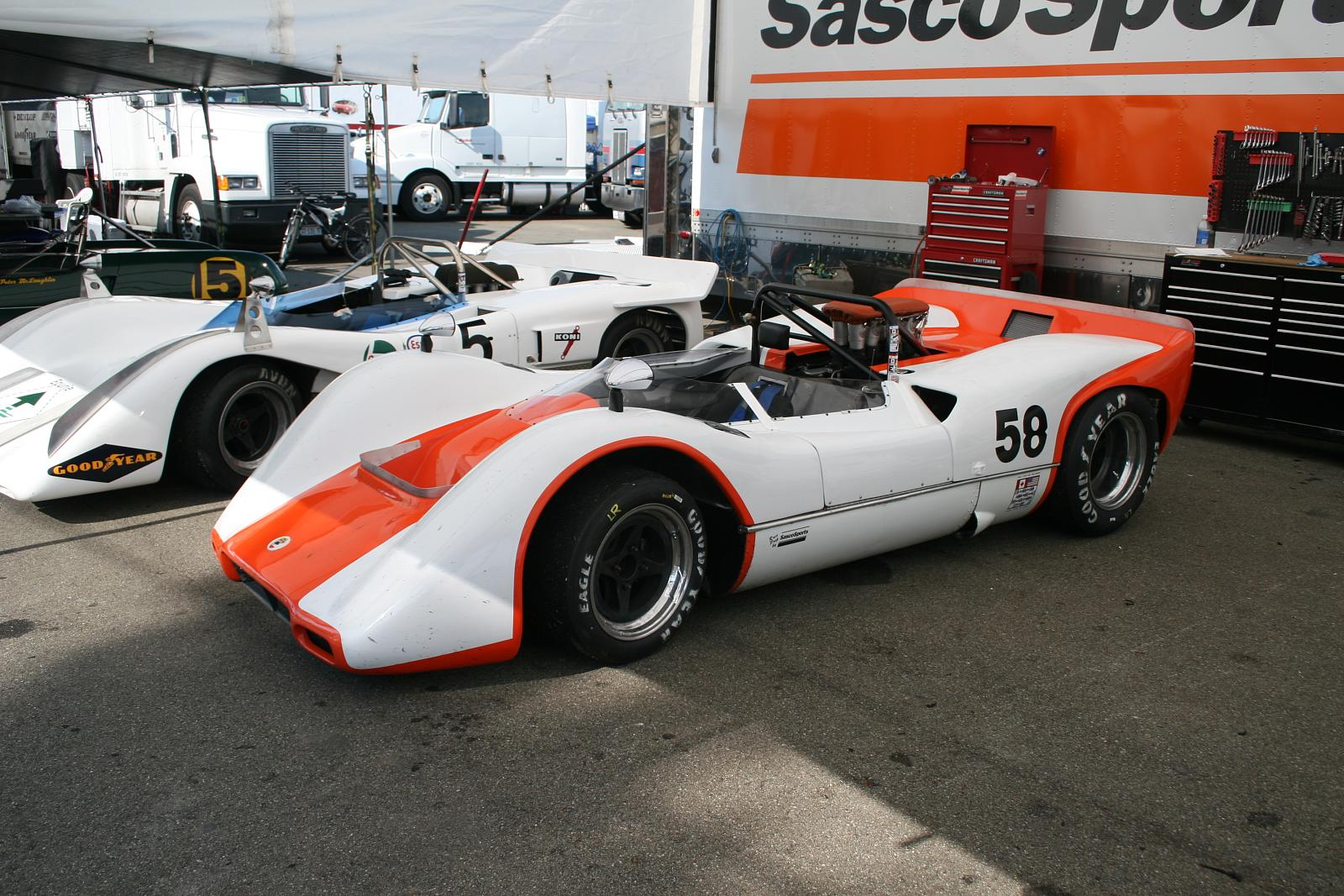
A McLaren M6B with an M8C in the background

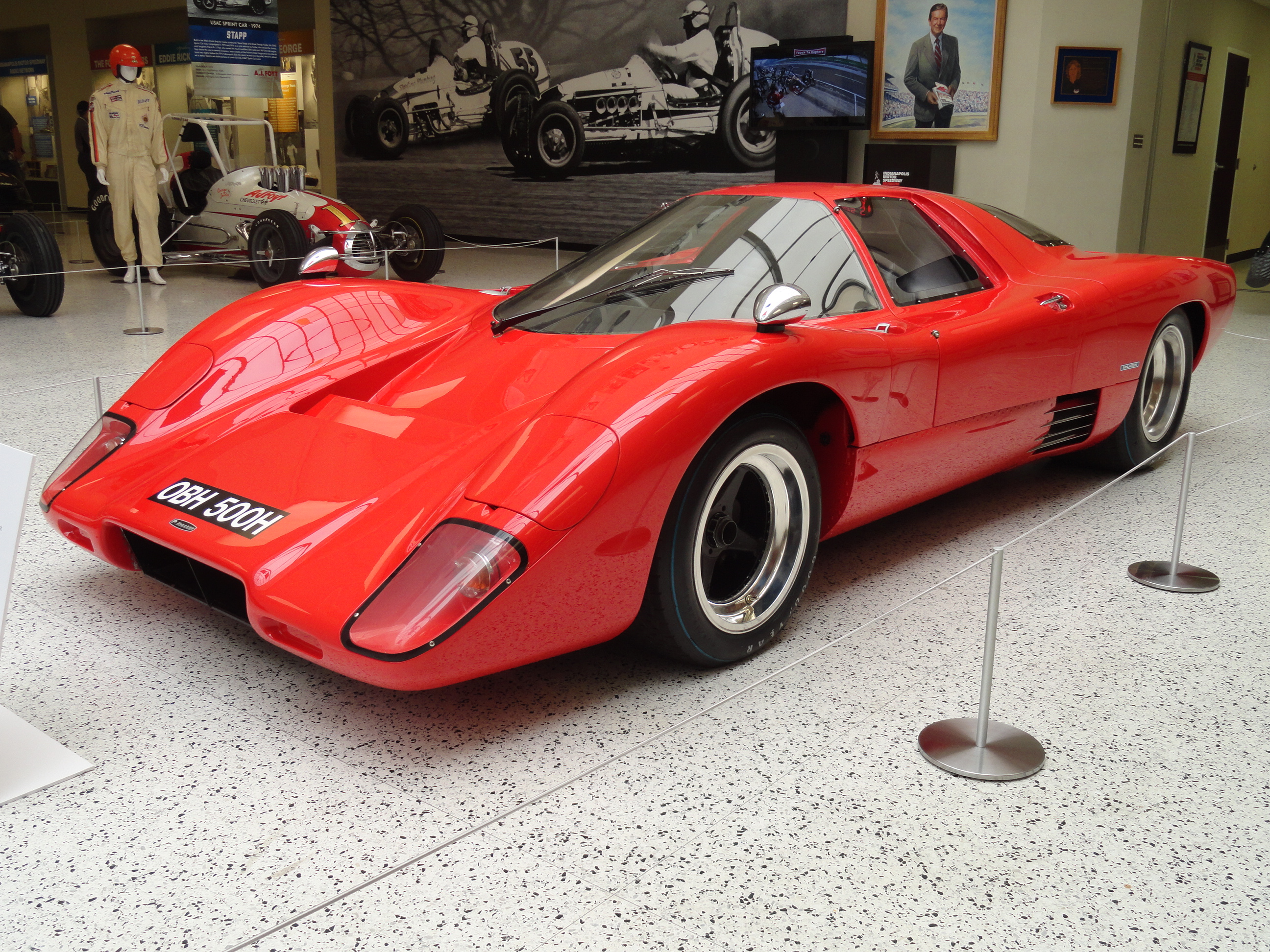
M6GT racecar turned road-legal coupe

The McLaren M6A was a Group 7 prototype race car designed and developed by driver Bruce McLaren, and built by his Bruce McLaren Motor Racing team for their entry in the 1967 Can-Am season. As a replacement for the team's M1Bs from 1966, the Chevrolet-powered M6A's improved design earned Bruce McLaren and his team their first of multiple Can-Am championships. After the M6As were replaced by the M8A in preparation for 1968, McLaren and technical partner Trojan–Tauranac Racing developed the M6B which was sold to customers for use in Can-Am as well as other racing series.

The M6 name was later used in the development of a closed-cockpit sports car for the 24 Hours of Le Mans known as the M6GT. The company's plan to homologate it for the FIA's Group 4 regulations was, however, never completed, and only a few M6GT prototypes were finished by McLaren and Trojan. Two M6GTs were later converted to road cars, one of which became Bruce McLaren's personal transport.

== Development ==
Bruce McLaren gathered several designers to develop the M6A during the off-season in early 1967. Along with McLaren himself, Robin Herd, Gordon Coppuck, Tyler Alexander, and Don Beresford all worked on the layout of the M6A's chassis and bodywork. The car featured the first monocoque chassis constructed by McLaren, while the bodywork was specifically shaped to increase downforce suited for the Can-Am circuits. McLaren's team also expanded into engine development, creating a fuel injection system for their Chevrolet V8s. Another addition to the team was a new tire supplier, with Goodyear replacing Firestone in exchange for a testing and development program.

The first M6A was completed in spring 1967, and brought to the nearby Goodwood Circuit for testing. Bruce McLaren Motor Racing carried out over 2000 miles of testing at the circuit in preparation for the upcoming Can-Am season, tuning the car as well as gathering data for Goodyear's use. As two further M6As were completed, the team shipped the cars to North America to prepare for the opening race of the season. A final addition to the cars was a coat of orange paint. This new McLaren Orange color scheme would eventually become synonymous with Bruce McLaren and the team.

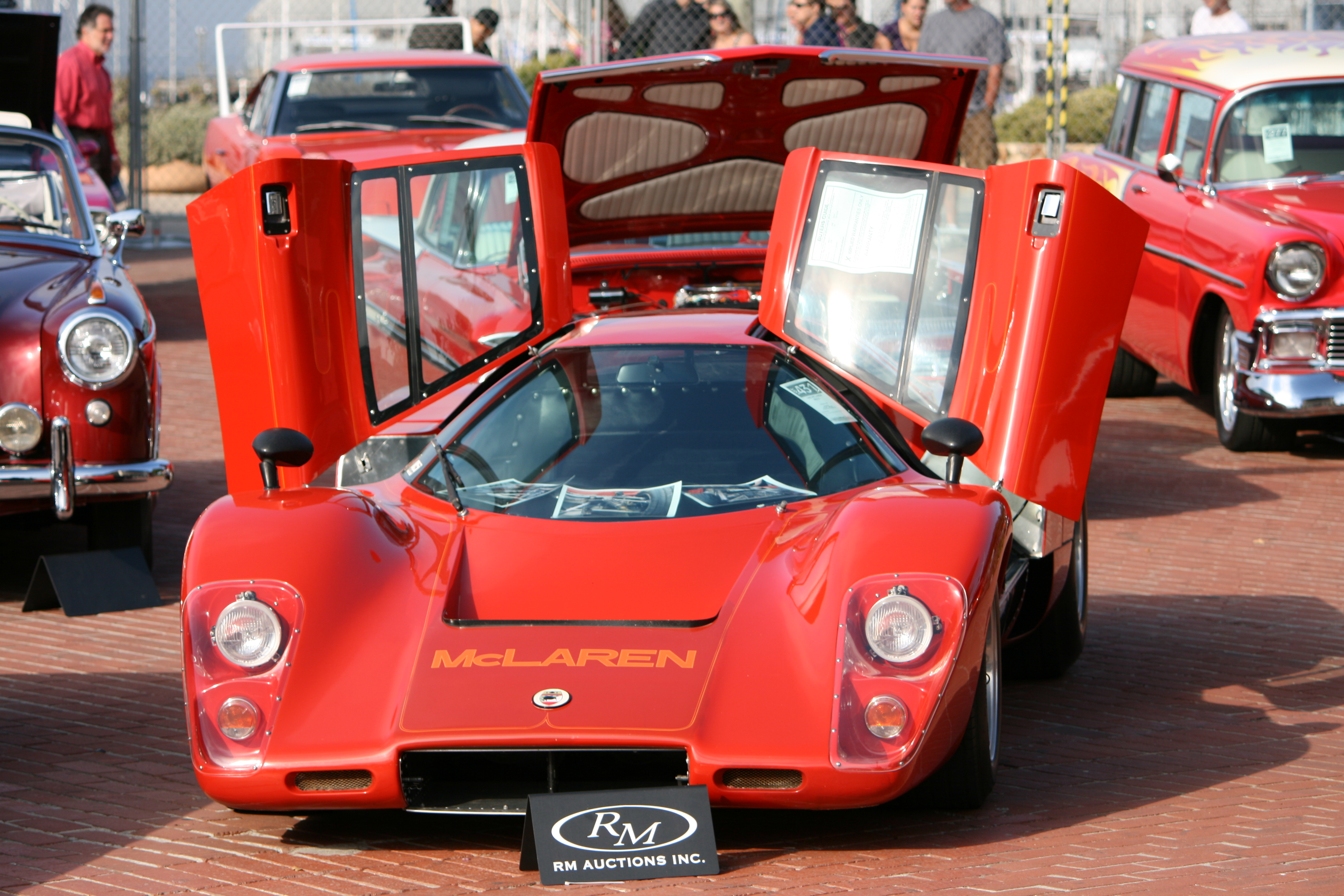
A McLaren M6GT coupé

After the retirement of the M6As, McLaren entrusted Trojan with constructing duplicates which could be sold to customers. These M6Bs were nearly identical to the M6As but were sold without an engine. Several other M6Bs were also modified to fit closed-cockpit bodywork.

== Racing history ==
The 1967 Can-Am season began in September at Road America. Bruce McLaren's M6A qualified for pole position with a new track record, while teammate Denny Hulme's car led once the race began. Although McLaren's car suffered an oil leak and failed to finish, Hulme was able to earn the car's first victory. The next two events had the team running away from the opposition, with Hulme and McLaren finishing first and second consecutively. The roles were, however, swapped over the next two races as it was McLaren who won on both occasions, but problems with Hulme's car allowed McLaren to take the lead in the points standings going into the final round. For the finale at the Stardust Grand Prix, problems with the Chevrolet motors led to blown engines and neither car reaching the finish. However, with their performance over the season, Bruce McLaren secured the 1967 Can-Am Challenge Cup, while Hulme was ranked second only three points behind.

As Bruce McLaren Motor Racing moved to develop the M8A, the M6Bs began to be delivered to customers for the 1968 season. Several of the M6As were also sold with Roger Penske purchasing one car for defending United States Road Racing Championship (USRRC) champion Mark Donohue. Donohue won several USRRC events that season and earned his second championship. Donohue also later won a race in Can-Am, beating the newer McLaren M8As. After the cancellation of the USRRC after 1968, the M6As and M6Bs continued to be used into the early 1970s but none were able to achieve victory against their newer competitors.

The M6A and M6B also featured prominently in the early years of the Australian Sports Car Championship (ASCC). Driving a McLaren M6B fitted with a 5.0 litre Repco RB760 V8 engine, John Harvey won the 1971 and 1972 championships.
