= 1974 Australian Sports Car Championship =

Seasons
- ← 1973 1975 →

The 1974 Australian Sports Car Championship was an Australian motor racing competition open to Group A Sports Cars and Group D Production Sports Cars. It was authorised by the Confederation of Australian Motor Sport as an Australian National Title.

Th championship, which was the sixth Australian Sports Car Championship, was won by Henry Michell driving an Elfin 360 Repco.

== Calendar ==
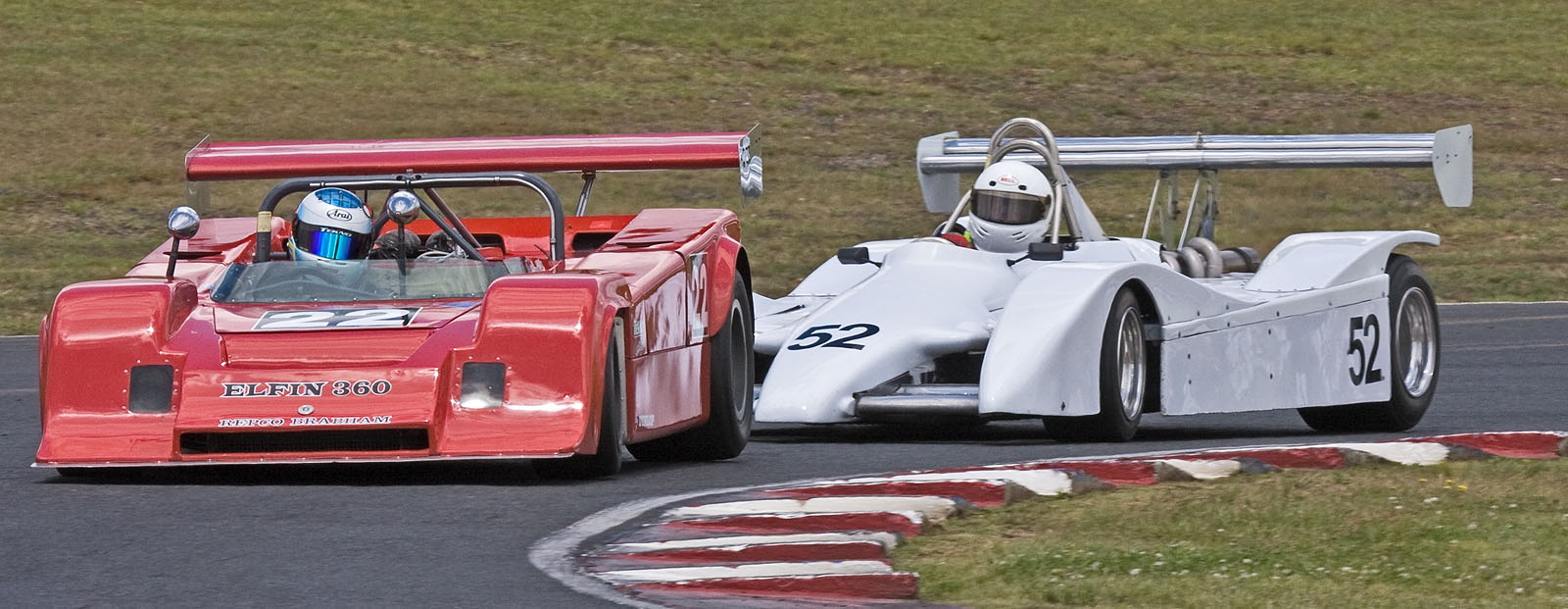
The Elfin 360 Repco (foreground) in which Henry Michell won the 1974 Australian Sports Car Championship. The car is pictured in 2008

The championship was contested over a four-round series with one race per round.

Round	Round name	Circuit	Date	Winner	Car
1		Adelaide International Raceway	31 March	Lionel Ayers	Rennmax Repco
2		Calder Raceway	26 May	Lionel Ayers	Rennmax Repco
3	Endeavour Cup	Phillip Island	13 October	Garrie Cooper	Elfin MS7 Repco Holden
4		Symmons Plains	11 November	Garrie Cooper	Elfin MS7 Repco Holden

== Classes ==
Cars competed in two engine displacement classes:

- Up to and including 2,500cc
- Over 2,500cc

== Points system ==
Championship points were awarded on a 9-6-4-3-2-1 basis to the first six place-getters in each class. Additional points were awarded on a 4-3-2-1 basis to the first four place-getters outright, irrespective of class.

== Championship results ==
Position	Driver	Car	Entrant	Ade.	Cal.	Phi.	Sym.	Total
1	Henry Michell	Elfin 360 Repco	Henry Michell	12	11	12	12	47
2	Lionel Ayers	Rennmax Repco	Lionel Ayers	13	13	-	-	26
=	Garrie Cooper	Elfin MS7 Repco Holden	Ansett Team Elfin	-	-	13	13	26
4	Bill O'Gorman	Matich SR5 Waggott	Singapore Airlines	-	6	8	-	14
5	Peter Jones	Farrell Clubman	Motor Improvements	-	4	7	-	11
6	Robin Pare	Elfin ME5 Chevrolet	Donald Elliott	-	9	-	-	9
7	Eric Boord	Boral Ford	Shell Racing Team	8	-	-	-	8
=	Peter Turnbull	Turnham GM6 Holden	P. Turnbull	-	-	-	8	8
9	Barry Randall	Rennmax Repco	Litre Motors	7	-	-	-	7
=	Alan Gissing	Gissing Holden	Alan Gissing	4	3	-	-	7
11	Alan Newton	R&T Chevrolet	A. Newton	-	-	6	-	6
12	Stuart Kostera	Kostera SR3A Chevrolet	Stuart Kostera Racing	-	5	-	-	5
13	Doug Clark	Wright Renault	Doug Clark	4	-	-	-	4
=	Paul Gibson	Lotus 23B Oldsmobile	Paul Gibson	-	-	4	-	4
15	John Phillips	Farrell Galant	Kookaburra Racing Team	3	-	-	-	3
=	Mike Drewer	Farrell CI/P	M. J. Drewer	-	3	-	-	3
=	Ross Wemyss	Farrell Toyota	Drug Houses of Australia	-	-	3	-	3
18	Jim Doig	Motorlab ASP	Motorlab Racing	2	-	-	-	2
=	Vaughan Gibson	Farrell Clubman	Linc Contemporary	-	2	-	-	2
20	Peter Hunter	Lotus Super 7	Peter Hunter	1	-	-	-	1
