= 1973 Australian Sports Car Championship =

Seasons
- ← 1972 1974 →

The 1973 Australian Sports Car Championship was a CAMS sanctioned motor racing title open to Group A Sports Cars and Group D Production Sports Cars. It was the fifth Australian Sports Car Championship. The title was won by South Australian Phil Moore, driving a 2.5 litre Repco V8 - engined Elfin 360.

== Calendar ==
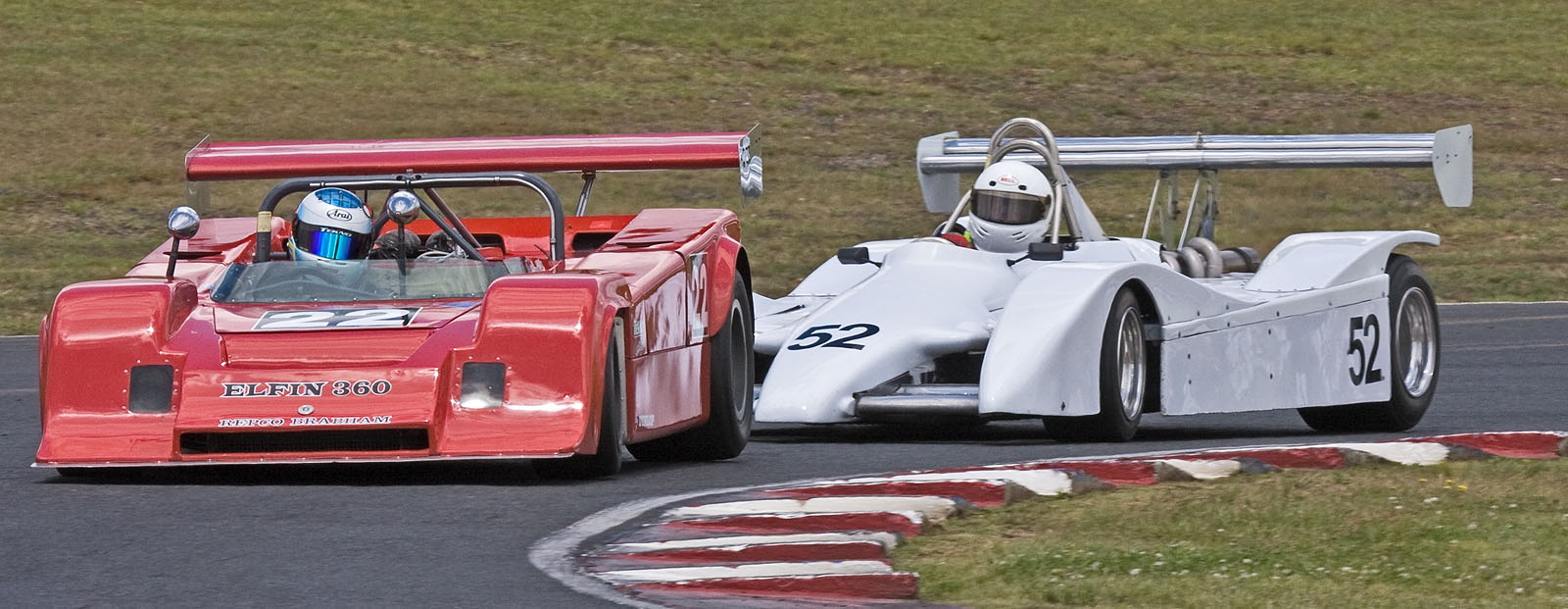
Phil Moore won the championship driving an Elfin 360 Repco similar to the ex Henry Michell example shown above

The championship was contested over a six round series with one race per round.

Round	Circuit	State	Date	Winning driver	Car
1	Phillip Island	Victoria	28 January	Phil Moore	Elfin 360 Repco
2	Adelaide International Raceway	South Australia	8 April	Lionel Ayers	Rennmax Repco
3	Sandown	Victoria	8 July	Phil Moore	Elfin 360 Repco
4	Wanneroo Park	Western Australia	12 August	Lionel Ayers	Rennmax Repco
5	Symmons Plains	Tasmania	11 November	Phil Moore	Elfin 360 Repco
6	Oran Park	New South Wales	8 December	Phil Moore	Elfin 360 Repco

== Classes and points system ==
Car competed in two engine displacement classes:

- Up to and including 2500cc
- Over 2500cc

Championship points were allocated on a 9-6-4-3-2-1 basis to the first six place-getters in each class at each round. Additional points were awarded on a 4-3-2-1 basis to the first four outright place-getters, regardless of class, at each round.

== Results ==
Position	Driver	Car	Entrant	Phillip Is.	Adelaide	Sandown	Wanneroo	Symmons	Oran Pk.	Total
1	Phil Moore	Elfin 360 Repco		13	-	13	-	13	13	52
2	Lionel Ayers	Rennmax Repco	Lionel Ayers	-	13	12	13	-	-	38
3	Ray Strong	Chevron B8 BMW	McLean-Strong Auto Clinic	-	8	5	4	-	9	26
4	Graeme Crawford	Elva BMW	Graeme Crawford	9	-	8	7	-	-	24
=	Henry Michell	Elfin 360 Repco	H Michell	-	12	-	12	-	-	24
6	Robin Pare	Elfin ME5 Chevrolet		-	-	-	-	12	-	12
7	John Latham	Bolwell Nagari		-	-	-	-	-	10	10
8	Dick Sorenson	Elfin 300C Ford Cosworth FVA		4	5	-	-	-	-	9
9	Stuart Kostera	Matich SR3 Ford	Stuart Kostera Racing	-	-	-	8	-	-	8
=	Max Thompson	Elfin 400 Ford		-	-	-	-	8	-	8

Only the top ten championship positions are shown in the above table.
