= Elfin Type 3 Clubman =

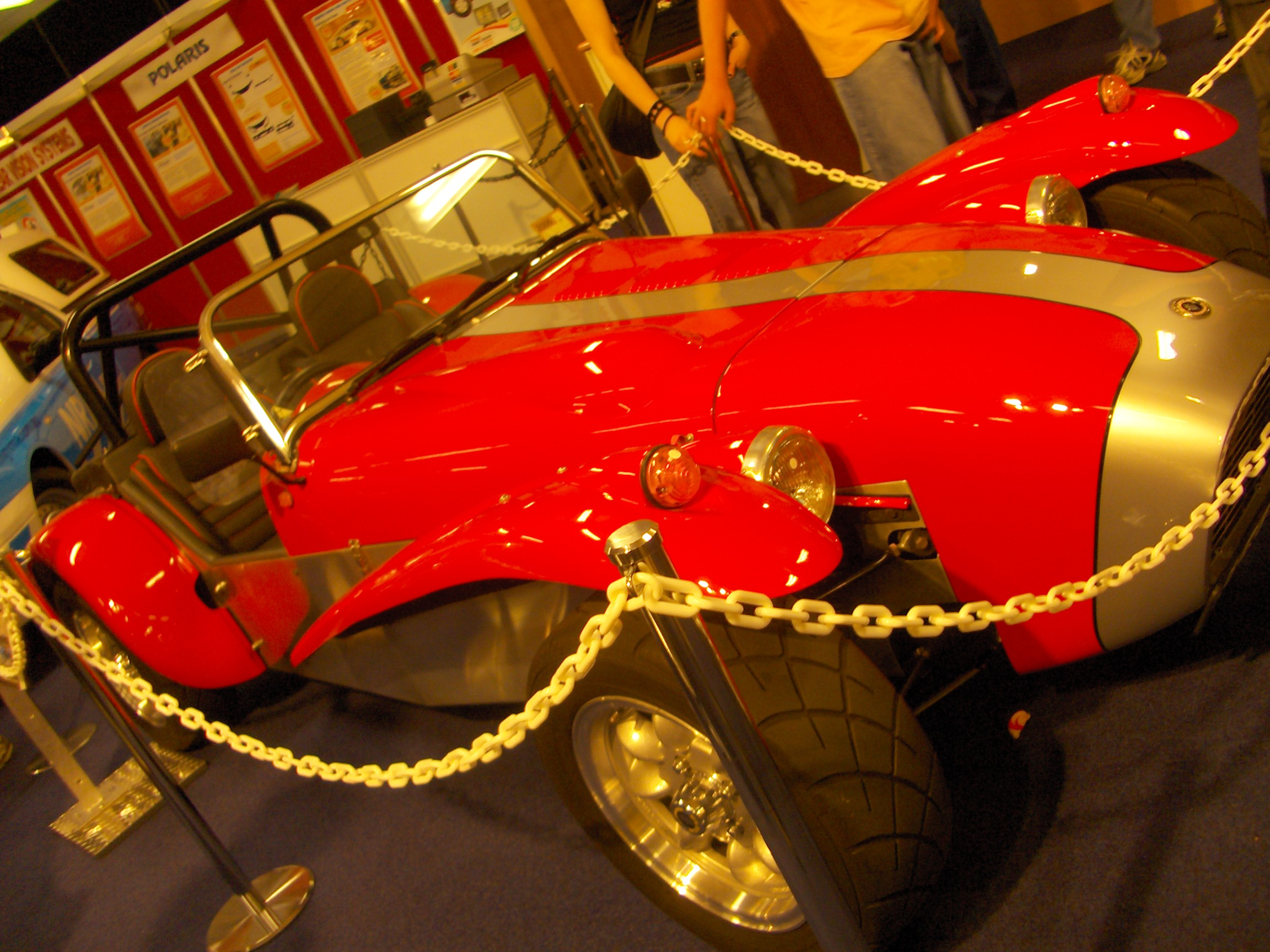
- Elfin Type 3 Clubman

Overview
- Manufacturer: Elfin Sports Cars
- Production: 1998 to 2007; 70 built

Body and chassis
- Body style: Open body 2 seat roadster
- Layout: Front-engine, rear-wheel-drive

Powertrain
- Engine: Toyota 4A DOHC 1.6 L (1,600 cc) 4 cylinder

Dimensions
- Curb weight: 600 kg

Chronology
- Successor: Elfin T5 Clubman

The Elfin Type 3 Clubman is a clubman-style automobile which was produced by Elfin Sports Cars in Australia from 1998 to 2007. It was produced in both kit car and turnkey variants. The rear end components were sourced from the Ford Escort Mark II.
