= Elfin MS8 Clubman =

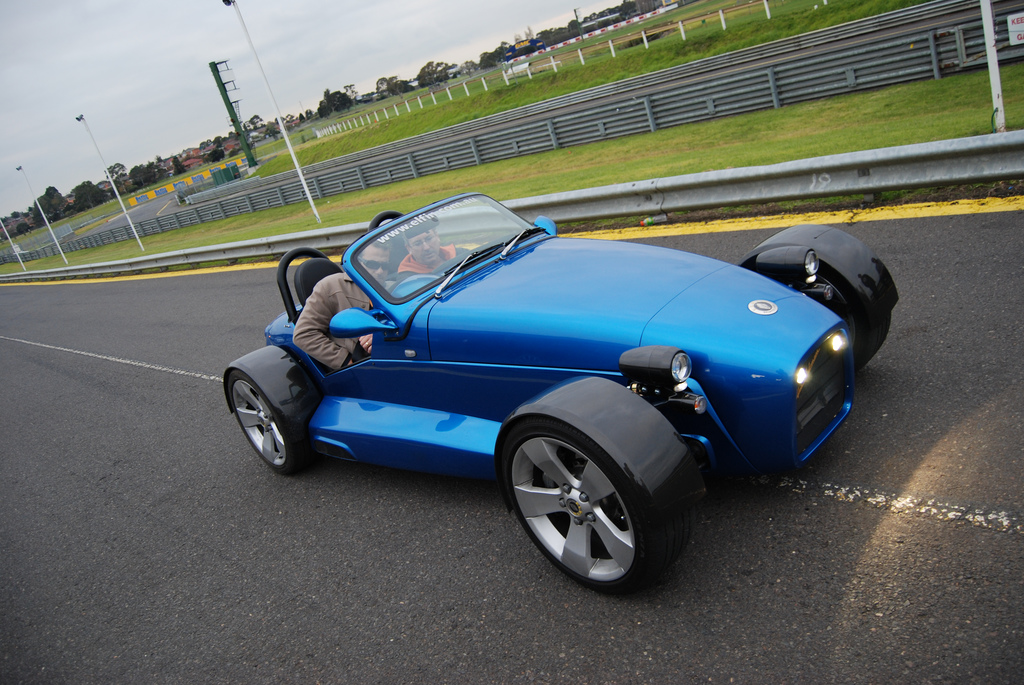

Overview
- Manufacturer: Elfin Cars
- Production: 2006–present 100 of both models per year.
- Designer: Mike Simcoe

Body and chassis
- Body style: Open body 2 seater
- Related: Streamliner

Powertrain
- Engine: 5.7L V8

Dimensions
- Length: 3.20 metres (126.0 in)
- Width: 1.70 metres (66.9 in)
- Curb weight: 925 kg (2,039 lb)

The Elfin MS8 Clubman is a sports car, successor to the Elfin MS7, a Repco-Holden V8 powered Group A Sports Car which won the 1975 Australian Sports Car Championship and the 1976 Australian Tourist Trophy.

Sales started in July 2006 with the Streamliner selling for $119,990 and the Clubman for $98,990. Production will be approximately 100 per year between the two models. UK sales began in April 2007, with importing handled by Walkinshaw Performance.

== Design ==
The Elfin MS8 Clubman model has been designed by Elfin Sports Cars and styled by the Holden Design team when Mike Simcoe was Styling Director. The cars were revealed at the 2004 Melbourne International Motor Show.

== Specification levels ==
The Clubman comes in three specifications: Sportster, Roadster and Racer. All are open wheeled configuration. The Sportster is a road registered entry-level model with small aeroscreen. The Roadster adds to the Sportster model a full windscreen, removable door panels and two-piece tonneau and the Racer model is a single seat racer for track only.

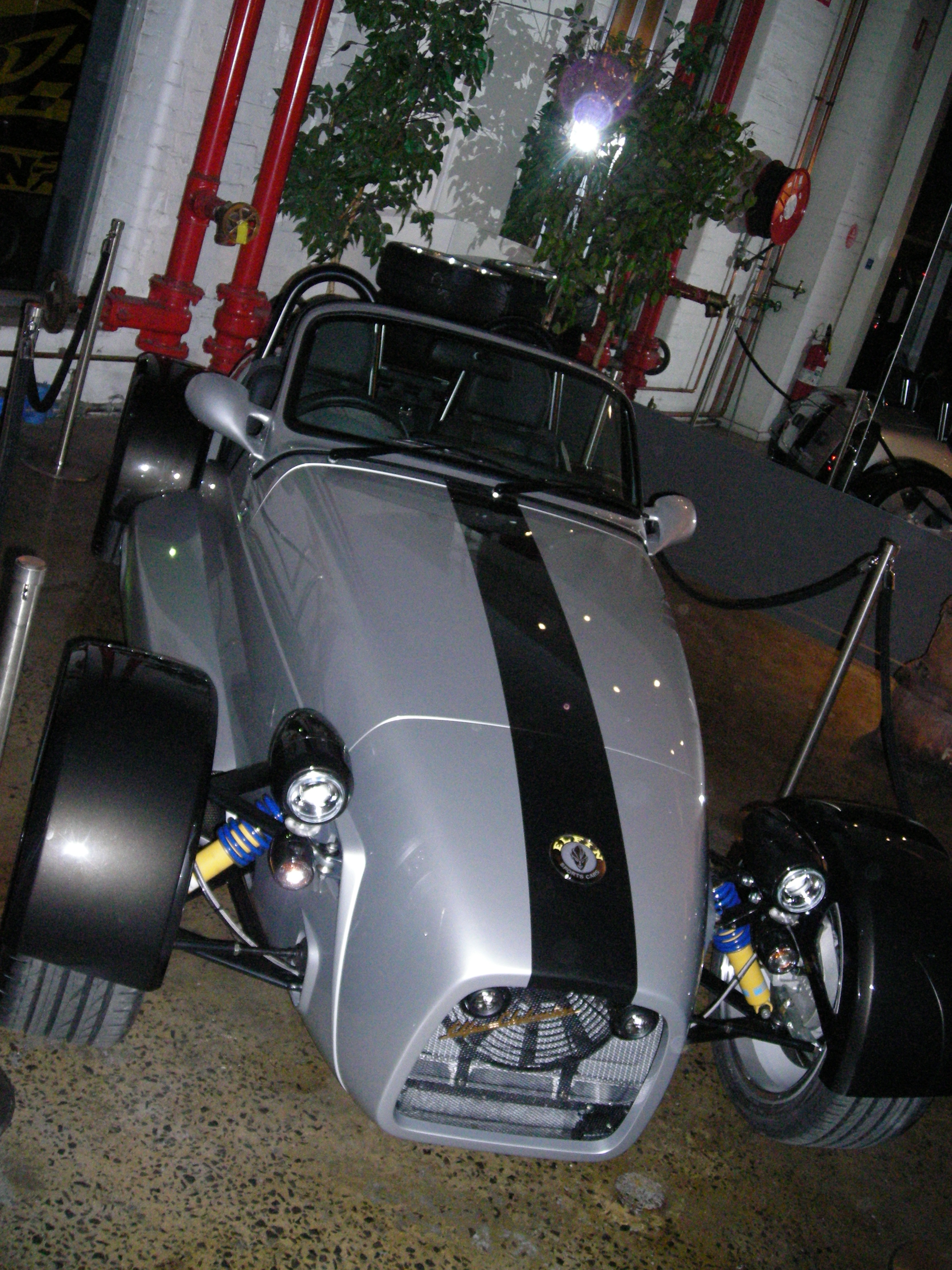
Standard model.

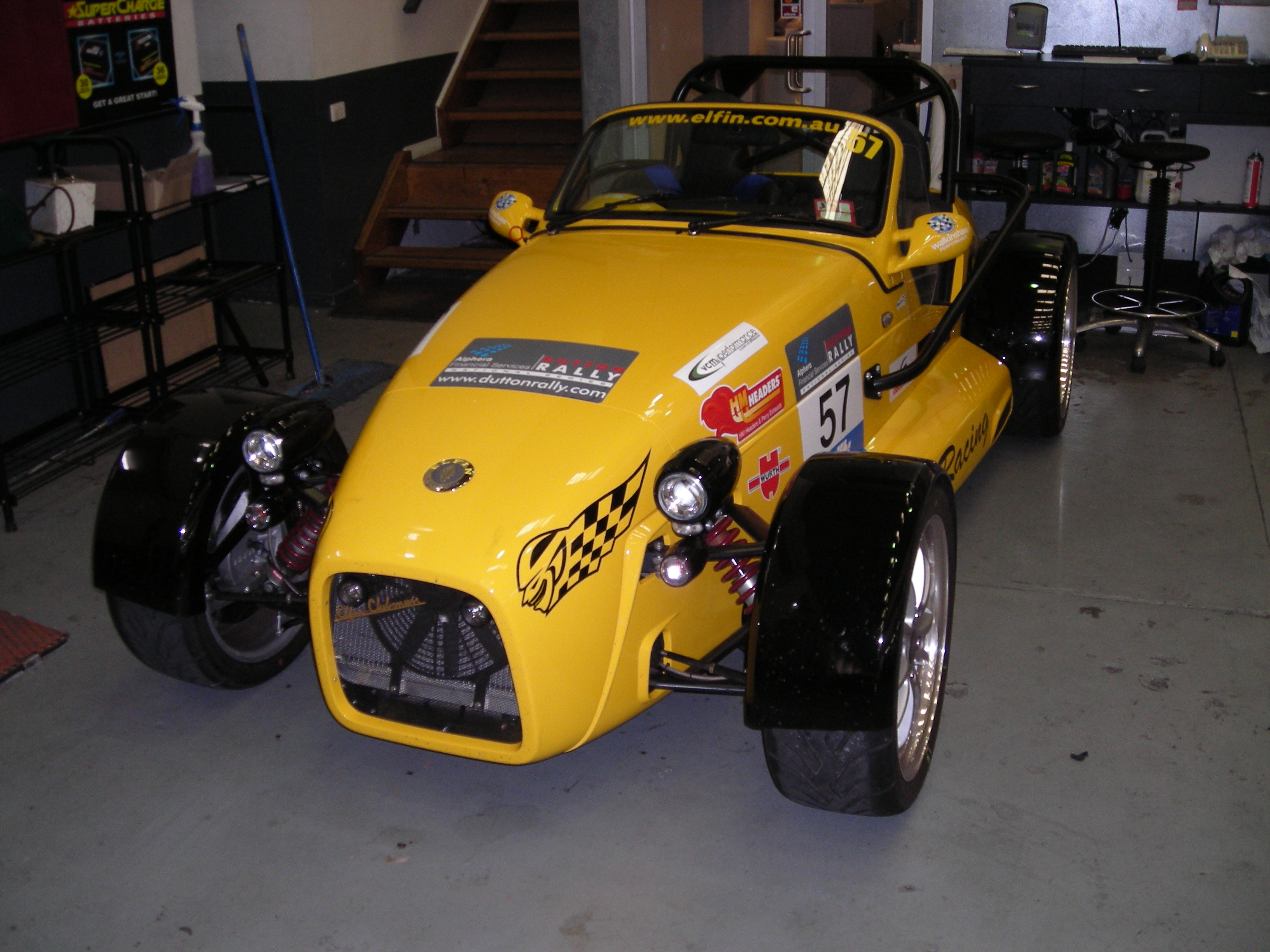
Racer model.

== Performance ==
Top speed 275 km/h (171 mph)
standing 400 m (0.25 mi) - 12.5 s
0 - 100 km/h (62 mph) in 4.4 seconds

== Technical specifications and features ==
=== Drivetrain ===
- 5.7-litre alloy Generation III V8 OHV 16 valves
- From 329 hp (245 kW; 334 PS)
- 6-speed gearbox
- Limited-Slip Differential (LSD)

=== Safety ===
- Traction control system
- ABS braking system
- Cruise control

=== Suspension ===
- Fully independent rear suspension with top and bottom wishbones plus toe link adjustment
- Front suspension with top and bottom chrome moly, unequal, aerofoil wishbones
- Fully adjustable race spec rose joints throughout
- Elfin alloy uprights (front and rear), fully adjustable for camber, caster & toe
- Coil over Koni shock absorbers, adjustable for bump, rebound and ride height

=== Brakes ===
- Slotted & ventilated 4-wheel disc brakes Front: 32 x 343 mm (13.5 in) discs
- Elfin alloy billet machined 6-pot calipers Rear: 18 x 315 mm (12.4 in) discs with handbrake
- Elfin alloy billet machined 4-pot calipers

=== Steering/Pedals ===
- Rack and pinion with adjustable steering column
- Fully adjustable alloy pedal box with brake bias adjustment

=== Wheels/Tyres ===
- Alloy 18" wheels
- 235 x 40 tyres

=== Construction ===
- Jig assembled, hand crafted multitubular space frame
- GRP body panels

=== Dimensions ===
- Length 3,200 mm (126.0 in)
- Front Track 1,460 mm (57.5 in)
- Width 1,700 mm (66.9 in)
- Rear Track 1,430 mm (56.3 in)
- Wheelbase 2,290 mm (90.2 in)
- Kerb Weight 925 kg (2,039 lb)
