= 1975 Australian Sports Car Championship =

Seasons
- ← 1974 1976 →

The 1975 Australian Sports Car Championship was a CAMS sanctioned Australian motor racing title open to Group A Sports Cars and Group D Production Sports Cars. The championship was contested over a single race staged at the Phillip Island circuit in Victoria, Australia on 30 November 1975. The race was run over 30 laps of the 4.76 km circuit, a total race distance of 143 km. It was the seventh Australian Sports Car Championship, and the only one in the twenty-year history of the title to be contested over a single race rather than over a series of races.

The championship was won by Garrie Cooper, driving an Elfin MS7.

== Results ==
Position	Driver	No.	Car	Entrant	Laps
1	Garrie Cooper	12	Elfin MS7 Repco-Holden	Ansett Team Elfin	30
2	Henry Michelle	1	Elfin 360 Repco	Henry Michelle	29
3	Fred Gibson	33	Alfa Romeo T33	Alfa Romeo Dealers	29
4	Paul Gibson		Rennmax Repco	Shell Racing	28
5	Stuart Kostera	9	Matich SR3A Repco	Stuart Kostera	28
6	Barry Singleton		Elfin 360 Repco	Barry Singleton Motors	28
7	Greg Doidge		Elfin 300	GSD Sheetmetal	27
8	Andrew Roberts		Roberts S2	Andrew Roberts	27
9	Peter Jones		Cheetah Clubman Toyota	Motor Improvements	27
10	Bob Romano		Elfin 360	Bob Romano	27
11	Jim Davidson		Lotus Elan		26
12	Vince Gregory		ASP 342 Clubman		25
13	Peter Middleton		Nganti Ford		25
14	Jim Doig		Motorlab ASP		25
15	James Bidstrup		ASP Clubman		25
16	Reg Byrne		MGB		24
17	Geoff Walker		GP Datsun		24
18	Steve Webb		Bolwell Nagari		24
19	Ray Gymer		Triumph TR5		23
20	Gay Cesario		Fiat 124S		23
DNF	Tom Tymons		Farrell C1		23
DNF	Jim Phillips		Rennmax Repco		22
DNF	Graeme Baird		Kregol Ford		22
DNF	Russell Collis		Gordon Clubman		22
DNF	Ray Bell		Hustler SC1		22
DNF	Peter Hopwood		Lotus Elan		21
DNF	Kevin Norden		Elfin		14
DNF	Alan Gissing		Gissing Holden		12
DNF	Grant Gibson		Lotus 23B Oldsmobile		10
DNF	Keith Poole	37	McLaren M8D Chevrolet	C&C Autos	
DNF	Geoff Watson		Watson Corolla		
DNF	Rex Colliver		Lotus 47		
DNF	Chris Hocking		Gordon C2		
DNF	Peter Beasley		Jensen Healey		
DNF	Doug Clark		Wright Renault		
DNF	David Phillips		Lotus 23		
DNF	Peter Woodward		Lotus 47		
DNF	Ross Wemyss		Farrell		
DNF	Doug Sheath		Bolwell		
DNF	Bob Kennedy		Triumph TR5		
DNF	Tim Trevor		MG Midget		
DNF	Richard Warland		ASP		
DNF	John Latham		MG Midget		

- Number of entries: 66
- Number of starters: Unknown
- Number of finishers: 20
- Pole position: Garrie Cooper (Elfin MS7), 1:47.2
- Winner's race time: 54:44.6
- Fatstest lap: Garrie Cooper (Elfin MS7) 1:45.6
