= Elfin Sports Cars =

Australian car manufacturer

Elfin Sports Cars Pty Ltd
- Type: Private
- Industry: Automotive
- Founded: 1959
- Founder: Garrie Cooper
- Headquarters: Keysborough, Melbourne, Australia
- Key people: Don Elliott; Tom Walkinshaw Shaun Baker Steven Baker Phani Bhogavalli
- Products: Elfin T5 Clubman; Elfin MS8 Clubman; Elfin MS8 Streamliner
- Services: Automobile manufacturing
- Parent: Young Timers Garage (YTG)
- Website: www.elfin.com.au

Elfin Sports Cars Pty Ltd (formerly known as Elfin Sports Cars) is an Australian car manufacturer company that was founded by Garrie Cooper. It has been an Australian manufacturer of sports cars and motor racing cars since 1959.

Elfin Sports Cars is currently owned by Young Timers Garage (YTG) after being purchased by the company in May 2023 from the Walkinshaw Group. It was previously owned by businessmen and historic racing enthusiasts Bill Hemming and Nick Kovatch (who remains as technical director) who purchased it in 1998.

Elfin is the oldest continuous sports car maker in Australia and one of the most successful with 29 championships and major Grand Prix titles. The original factory was located at Conmurra Avenue, Edwardstown in suburban Adelaide, South Australia. The company is currently located in Keysborough, a suburb of Melbourne, Australia.

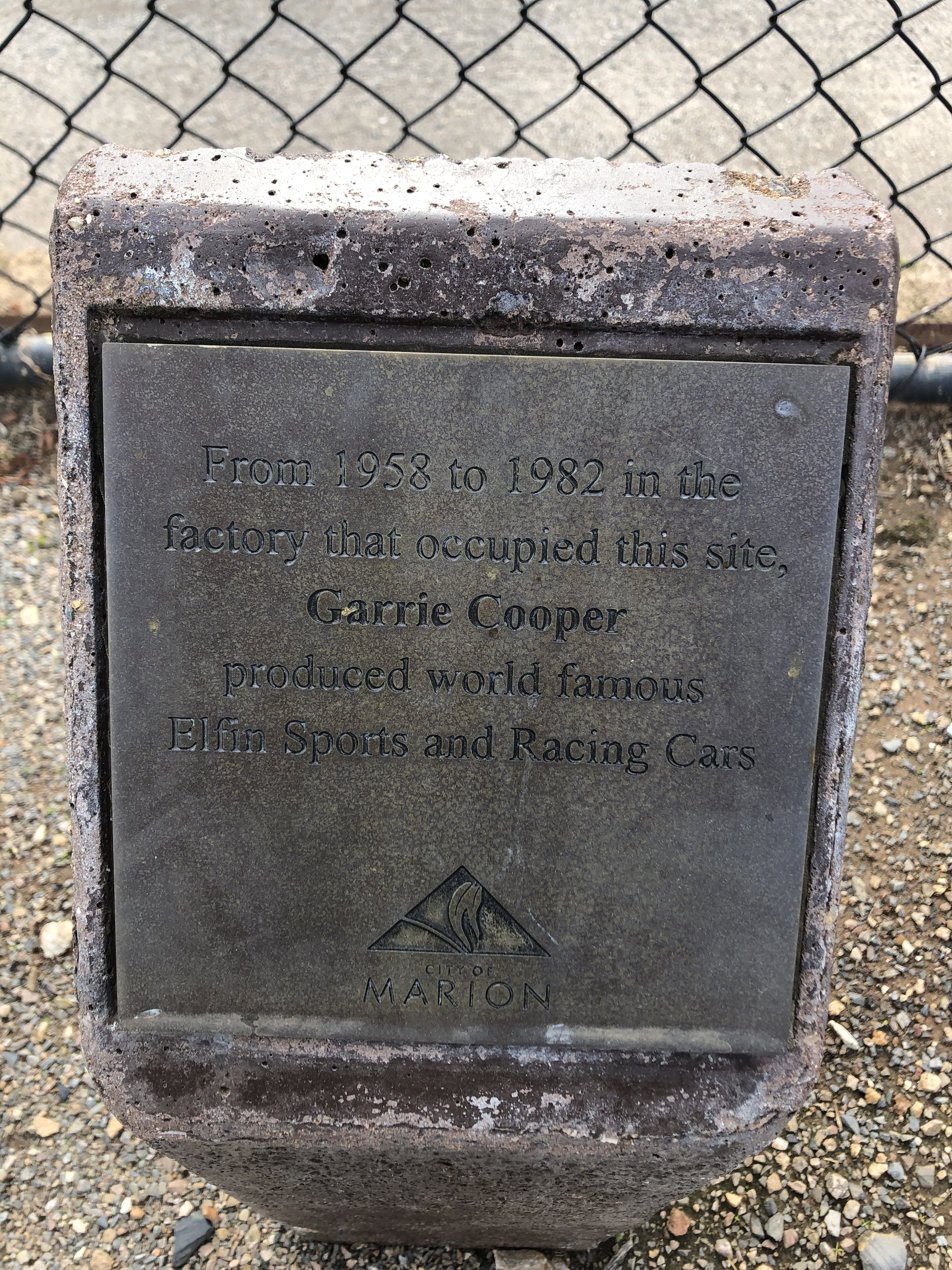
Plaque at Conmurra Avenue in remembrance of Elfin

== History ==
The company was founded in South Australia as Elfin Sports Cars in October 1959 by Garrie Cooper, who would go on to be a champion race driver as well as a successful designer and builder of Elfin racing and sports-racing cars. In 1983, following the death of its founder the previous year, the firm was bought by Tasmanian Don Elliott, racing driver Tony Edmondson and mechanic John Porter who re-established the provision of parts and service to existing owners.

Cooper died suddenly on ANZAC Day (25 April) in 1982, at the age of 46, from a burst aorta, due to the vessel's weakness from medication he took to thin his blood after a mid-1970s heart valve operation. Cliff Cooper, Garrie's father, completed outstanding orders, including six new generation Formula Vees, before offering the business for sale as well as designing a new Formula Vee, the Crusader, and a Formula Brabham car.

In 1993, Victorian Murray Richards acquired Elfin and set out to build a new generation Elfin Clubman called the Type 3. In failing health, he sold Elfin to Bill Hemming and Nick Kovatch in 1998 who relocated the business to Melbourne, Victoria.

Elfin subsequently began a collaboration with GM Holden, revealing a concept MS8 Streamliner at the Melbourne International Motor Show in 2004. Limited production of two versions of the MS8 began in March 2006 and after the business was sold to Tom Walkinshaw (of HSV / Walkinshaw Performance) in December 2006, future limited production units were retailed Australia-wide via select HSV dealerships in each state.

Following his death in December 2010, ownership of Elfin remained vested in the estate of Tom Walkinshaw ... but, there has been no further production of any Elfin cars since March 2012.

In May, 2023, Elfin was sold to Shaun Baker, Steven Baker and Phani Bhogavalli of luxury car dealer, Young Timers Garage (YTG), located in Keysborough, Victoria. YTG have announced plans to revitalise the brand after it sat dormant for 10 years under the Walkinshaw ownership.

The Elfin Heritage Centre dedicated to Elfin Sports Cars including Garrie Cooper’s first (Cooper Austin) and last (MR9 F5000) race cars, plus the prototype of his planned Formula Vee based road sports car. Opened in Melbourne on 16 August 2007, the centre features 24 current and historic vehicles and is open to the public.

== Racing ==
Elfin drivers have won 29 championships and major races including:

Championships
Australian Sports Car Championship

- 1970, 1973, 1974, 1975

Australian Formula Ford Series

- 1970, 1971, 1974, 1982

Australian Drivers' Championship

- 1973, 1975

Rothmans International Series

- 1979

Races
Australian Tourist Trophy

- 1966, 1976, 1978

Singapore Grand Prix

- 1968

Malaysian Grand Prix

- 1968, 1969, 1972

New Zealand Grand Prix

  - 1973, 1974

Rose City 10000

- 1978

Famous drivers of Elfin cars included 1976 Formula One World Drivers' Champion James Hunt, and French F1 driver, Didier Pironi. Others included Australian F1 drivers Vern Schuppan and Larry Perkins, as well as John Bowe, Johnnie Walker, Frank Matich, John McCormack, Max Stewart, Kevin Bartlett, Bob Jane, Allan Grice, Peter Manton, Niel Allen and Mark Mclaughlin.

== Models ==
=== Recent vehicles ===
In 2006, Elfin began producing two related V8-powered sports cars : the MS8 Streamliner and the MS8 Clubman. Thereafter, in 2008, Elfin introduced what might be termed an entry-level model, the turbocharged four cylinder T5 Clubman.

Engines for the MS8 cars were essentially standard production 5.7 litre Gen III V8s as supplied to GM Holden for their VZ-series Commodore vehicles. For the T5 Clubman, Pontiac-derived engines were supplied by GM Powertrain (USA).

The MS8 cars have significant power (circa 255kW) for their size and weight, but are infamous for "spirited" handling. Some media regarded the MS8 vehicles as somewhat disappointing, considering Elfin's motorsport history.

Elfin vehicle production was officially in hiatus by March 2012, with ongoing enquiries at that time to be directed to the related Walkinshaw Performance business.

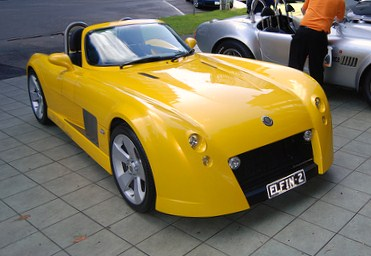
Elfin MS8 Streamliner

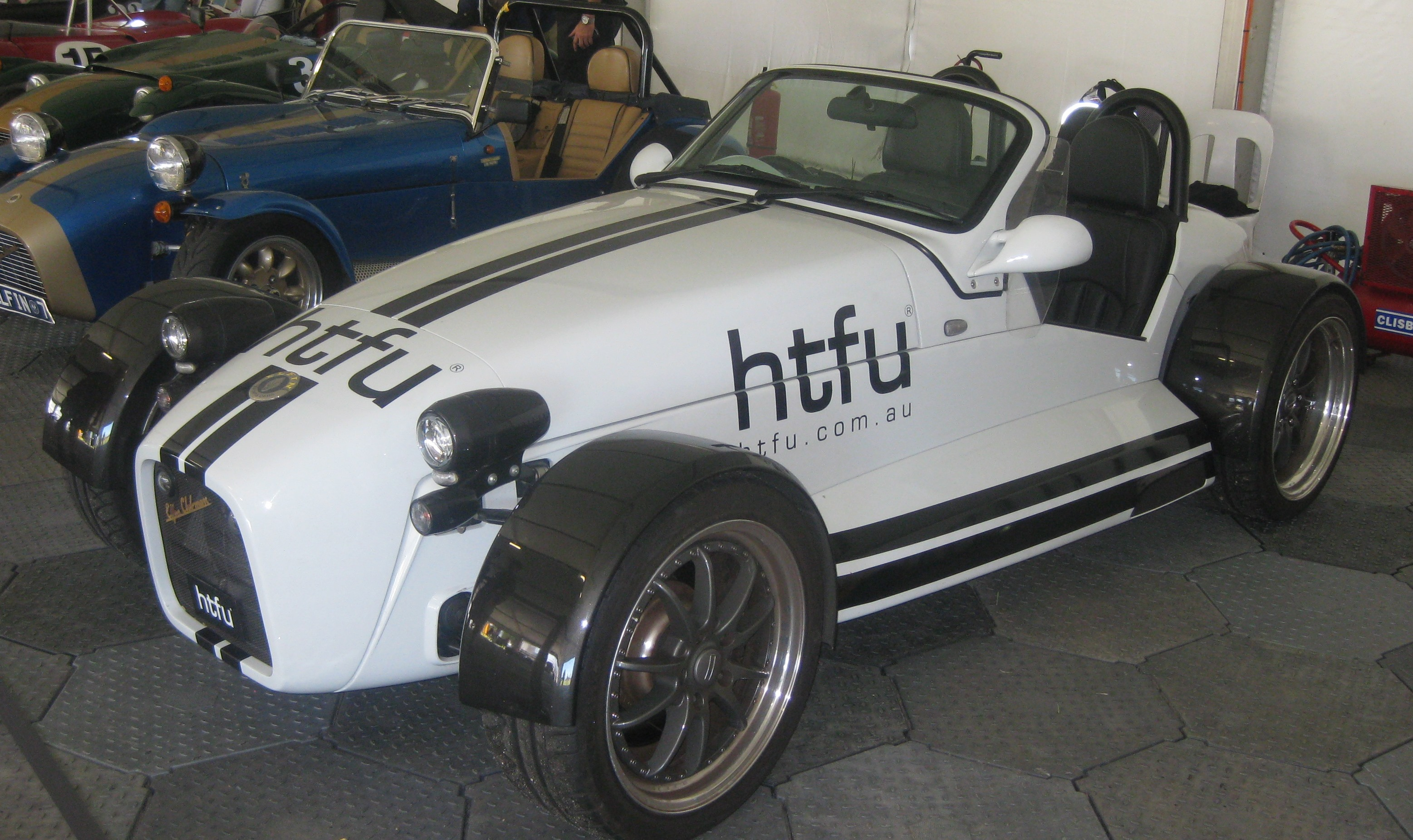
Elfin MS8 Clubman

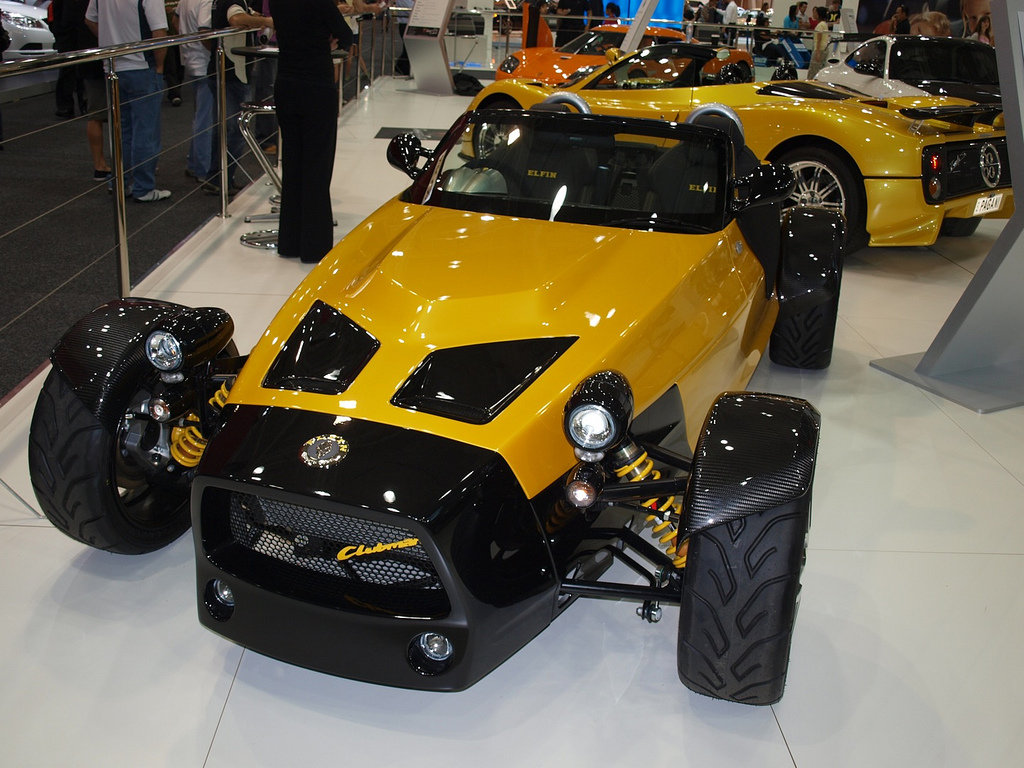
Elfin T5 Clubman

=== Historic vehicles – Garrie Cooper era ===
The original company produced 248 racing and sports racing cars in 27 different models over a 25-year period.

Model	Total	Production	Description	Image
Streamliner	23	1959–1963	Sports racing car (front engined)	
Formula Junior & Catalina	20	1961–1964	Formula Junior racing car & small capacity racing car. The two models differed only in minor specifications and the majority built were Formula Juniors.	
Clubman	14	1961–1965	Clubman sports car	
Mallala	5	1962–1964	Sports racing car	
Type 100 Mono	19	1964–1969	Australian 1½ Litre Formula racing car	
Type 500	21	1965–1969	Formula Vee racing car	
Type 400	4	1966–1967	Group A sports racing car (V8 powered)	
Type 300	6	1967–1969	Sports racing car	
600/B/C/D/E	27	1968–1971	Racing car (various formulae)	
600 FF	17	1969–1972	Formula Ford racing car	
Type 350	1	1969 only	Sports racing car	
ME5	1	1969 only	Group A sports racing car (V8 powered)	
Type 360	3	1971 only	Sports racing car	
MR5	4	1971–1972	Australian Formula 1 racing car (F5000). The first F5000 car designed and built by Elfin.	
620FF / 620B	20	1972–1975	Formula Ford racing car	
622	6	1972–1974	Australian Formula 2 racing car	
623	8	1973–1974	Australian Formula 3 racing car	
MR6	1	1974 only	Australian Formula 1 racing car (F5000)	
MS7	1	1974 only	Sports racing car (V8 powered)	
630	2	1974–1975	Australian Formula 2 racing car	
700	7	1975–1977	Australian Formula 2 racing car	
MR8	3	1976–1978	Australian Formula 1 racing car (F5000)	
New Generation "NG"	29	1976–1983	Formula Vee racing car	
792	3	1979 only	Australian Formula 2 racing car	
Aero FF	1	1979 only	Formula Ford racing car	
GE Two-25	1	1980 only	Australian Formula 2 racing car	
MR9	1	1980 only	Australian Formula 1 racing car (F5000). The first open-wheel race car to be designed and built in Australia using ground effect aerodynamics. This remains the only F5000 car designed and constructed from the ground up with full ground effect aerodynamics.	
Total	248			

=== Historic vehicles – The post–Garrie-Cooper era ===
Model	Total	Production	Description	Image
FF84	1	1984	Formula Ford racing car.	
NG "EP"	8	1984–1986	Edmondson-Porter run one of the NG Series Formula Vee racing cars.	
Crusader	20	Circa 1990	Formula Vee racing car.	
852	1	1985	Australian Formula 2 racing car driven by Mark Mclaughlin.	
FA891	1	1989	Formula Holden racing car fielded in the 1989 Australian Drivers' Championship by Elfin Sports Cars driven by Mark Mclaughlin, winning the very first race of the new series at Mallala. Follow up orders from competitors were not forthcoming, largely preferring to import the latest British designs from Lola, Ralt and Reynard. The FA in FA891 was for the category's original working name, Formula Australia.	
Type 3 Clubman	70	1998–2007	Clubman sports car. Powered by a supercharged Toyota 4AG ZE engine.	

== See also ==
- List of automobile manufacturers
- List of car brands
