= 1962 Australian Grand Prix =

- Race 6 of 6 in 1962 Australian Drivers' Championship

Race details
- Date: 18 November 1962
- Location: Caversham, Western Australia
- Course: Airfield circuit
- Course length: 3.621 km (2.25 miles)
- Distance: 60 laps, 198.78 km (123.54 miles)
- Weather: Sunny

Pole position
Driver	(New Zealand) Bruce McLaren	Cooper-Climax
- Time: 1'19.6

Fastest lap
Driver	(Australia) Jack Brabham	Repco Brabham-Climax
- Time: 1'20.0

Podium
First	(New Zealand) Bruce McLaren	Cooper-Climax
Second	(Australia) John Youl	Cooper-Climax
Third	(Australia) Bib Stillwell	Cooper-Climax

The 1962 Australian Grand Prix was a motor race for Formula Libre cars, held at the Caversham circuit in Western Australia, Australia on 18 November 1962. It was the twenty seventh Australian Grand Prix and the sixth and final race in the 1962 Australian Drivers' Championship. The Grand Prix meeting was organised by the Western Australian Sporting Car Club Inc.

Held at the former United States Navy air base in still remote Western Australia, the race had just ten starters, seven of which had made the long journey across the Nullarbor Plain from the eastern states, and three of which were local entries. It was the third of only four Australian Grands Prix to be contested in Western Australia with the next held in 1979.

Bruce McLaren won his first Australian Grand Prix, beginning a new era for the race in which the results would be dominated by professional drivers and teams rather than the gentleman amateurs who had won most of the post-war AGP races. It also began an AGP rivalry between the two senior drivers from the region, McLaren and Jack Brabham who were already long-time rivals in Formula One racing.

== Race classification ==
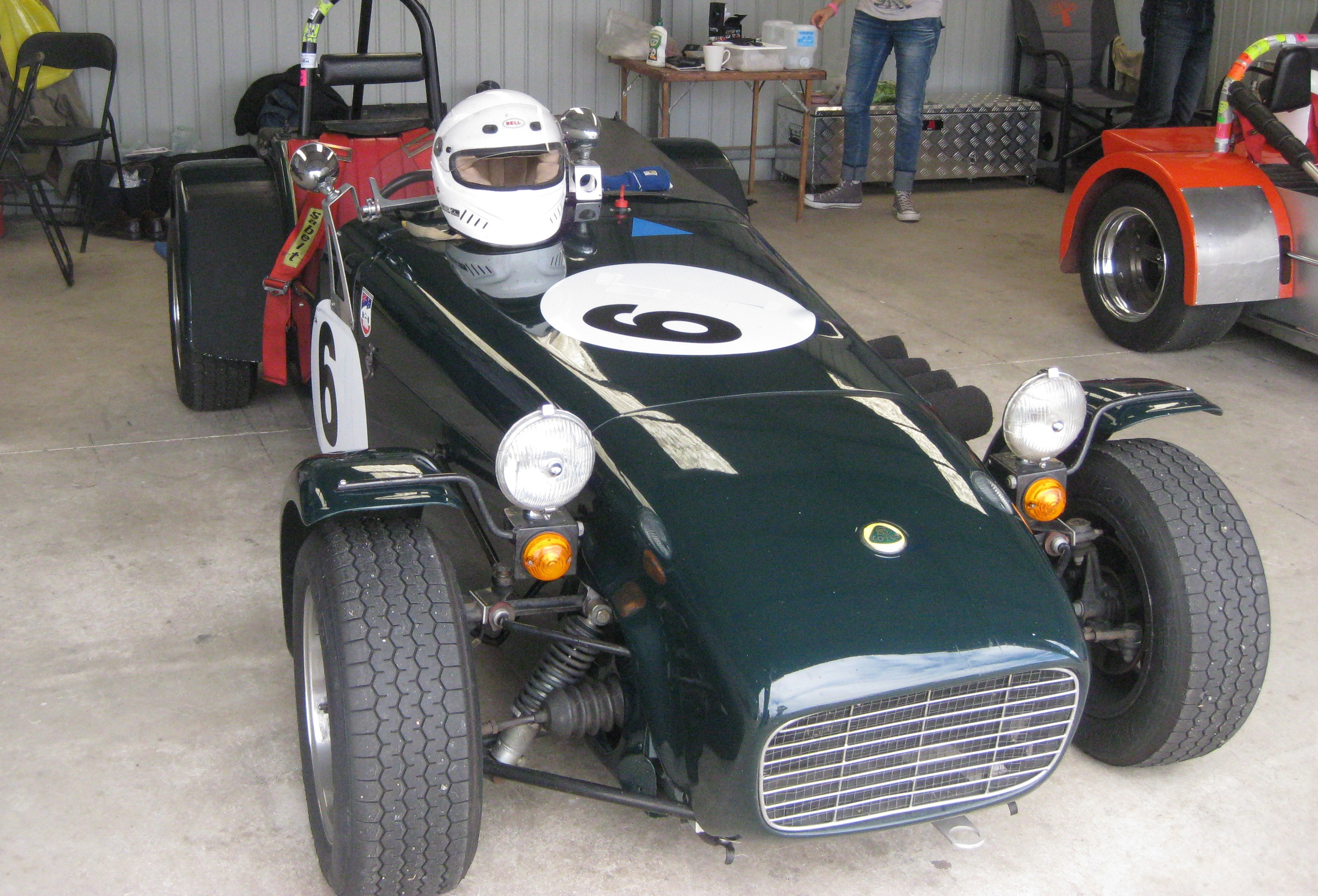
The 9th placed Lotus Super 7, pictured in 2012

Results as follows.

Pos	No.	Driver	Entrant	Car	Laps	Time
1	47	(New Zealand) Bruce McLaren	Bruce McLaren	Cooper T62 / Coventry Climax FPF 2.7L	60	1h 21m 58.4s
2	5	(Australia) John Youl	Scuderia Veloce	Cooper T55 / Coventry Climax FPF 2.5L	60	1h 22m 40.0s
3	6	(Australia) Bib Stillwell	B. S. Stillwell	Cooper T55 / Coventry Climax FPF 2.5L	60	1h 22m 44.7s
4	9	(Australia) Bill Patterson	Bill Patterson Motors	Cooper T51 / Coventry Climax FPF 2.5L	57	
5	7	(Australia) Arnold Glass	Capitol Motors	BRM P48 / Buick 3.9L	55	
6	14	(Australia) Syd Negus	S. A. Negus	Cooper T20 / Repco-Holden 2.3L	47	
7	2	(Australia) Ted Edwards	E. D. Edwards	T.S. Special / GMC 4.5L	47	
8	4	(Australia) Lex Davison	Ecurie Australie	Cooper T53 / Coventry Climax FPF 2.7L	46	
9	26	(Australia) Jeff Dunkerton	Reimann Motors	Lotus Super 7 / Ford 1.5	46	
Ret	1	(Australia) Jack Brabham	Ecurie Vitesse	Repco Brabham BT4 / Coventry Climax FPF 2.5L	50	Accident
DNS	10	(Australia) Ron Downey	Sporting Cars	Ferrari 166 F2 / Chevrolet 4.6L	-	Engine
DNS	12	(Australia) Ron McCormack	Ron McCormack	Maybach 3 / Chevrolet 4.6L	-	
DNS	15	(Australia) Jack Ayers	Superior Cars	Alta F2 / Holden 2.4L	-	
DNS	17	(Australia) Dave Gordon	Dave Sullivan Motors	DJ Special / Holden 2.5L	-	
DNS	11	(Australia) Wally Higgs	W. Higgs	Peugeot Special / Peugeot 1.1L	-	Engine
DNS	18	(Australia) Don Willison	Don Willison	HRD Special / Vincent 1.0L	-	

=== Additional awards ===
- 1st Australian resident driver: John Youl
- 1st Western Australian resident driver: Syd Negus

== Notes ==
- Pole Position: Bruce McLaren - 1:19.6
- Winner's average speed: 145.49 km/h
- Fastest Lap: Jack Brabham, 1:20.0s, 92.65 mph, 149.1 km/h

Preceded by 1961 Australian Grand Prix	Australian Grand Prix; 1962	Succeeded by 1963 Australian Grand Prix
