= 1961 International 100 =

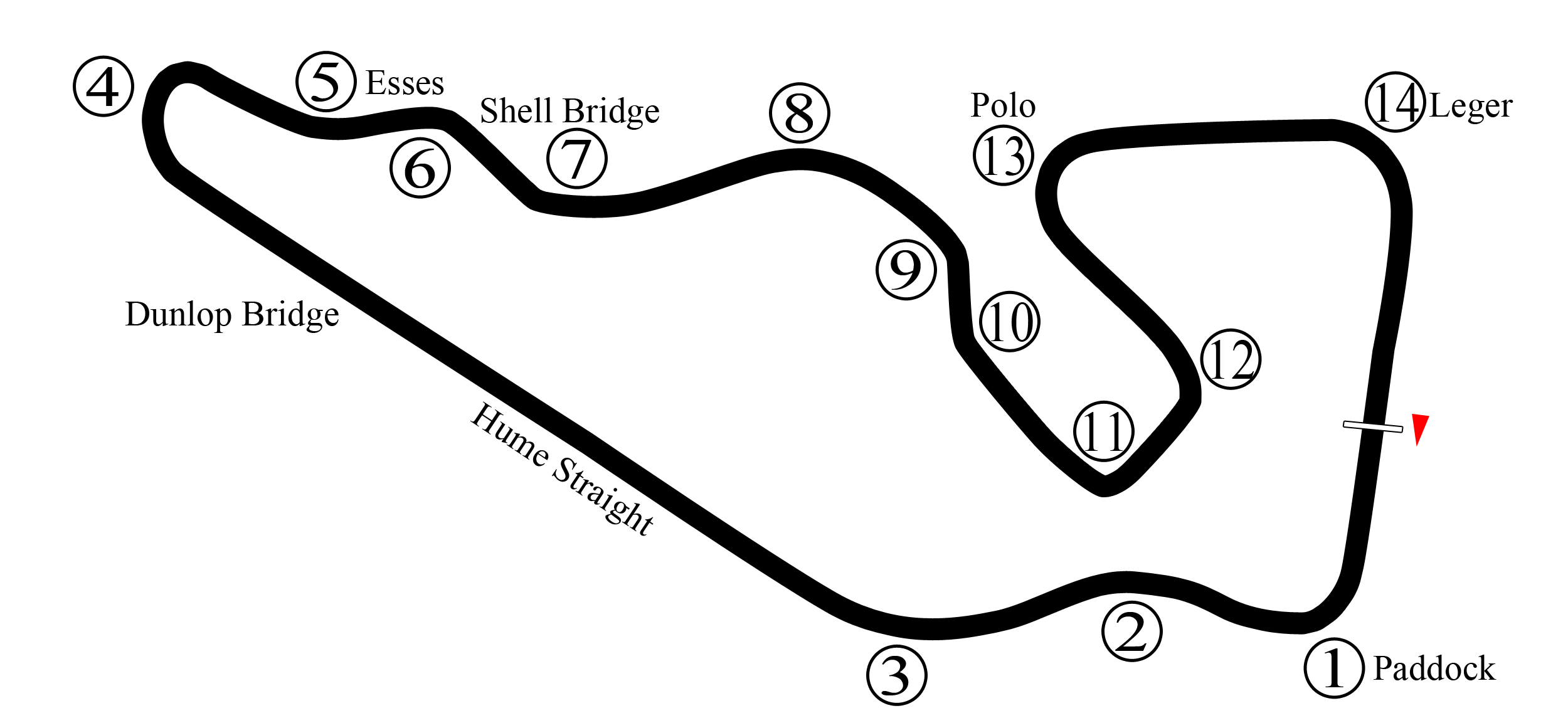
Layout of the Warwick Farm Raceway (1960-1973)

The 1961 International 100 was a motor race staged at the Warwick Farm Raceway in New South Wales, Australia on 29 January 1961. Contested as a Formula Libre race, it was staged over a distance of 101.25 miles (163 km) and was the first annual International 100 race to be held at Warwick Farm.

The race was won by Stirling Moss, driving a Lotus 18 Coventry Climax FPF.

== Race results ==
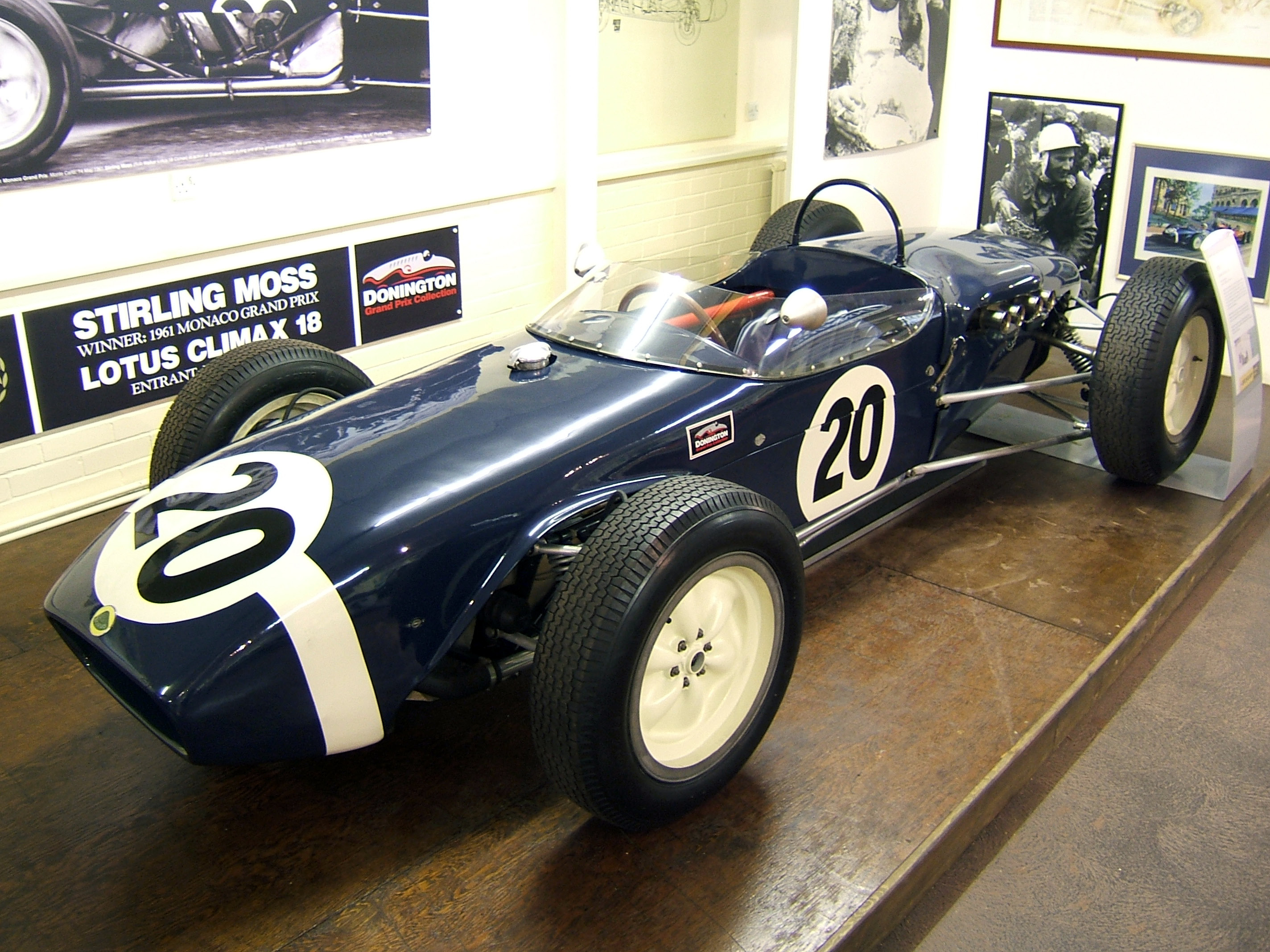
Stirling Moss won the race driving a Lotus 18, similar to the example pictured above

Position	Driver	No.	Car	Entrant	Laps
1	Stirling Moss	7	Lotus 18 Coventry Climax FPF	RRC Walker	45
2	Innes Ireland	8	Lotus 18 Coventry Climax FPF	Team Lotus	44
3	Bib Stillwell	16	Cooper T51 Coventry Climax FPF	BS Stillwell	43
4	Austin Miller	14	Cooper T51 Coventry Climax FPF	Superior Cars Pty Ltd	43
5	Ron Flockhart	10	Cooper T51 Coventry Climax FPF	R Flockhart (Border Reivers)	37
DNF	Dan Gurney	6	BRM P48	Owen Racing Organisation	40
DNF	Jack Brabham	11	Cooper T51 Coventry Climax FPF	J Brabham	25
DNF	Arnold Glass	2	Cooper T51 Maserati	Capitol Motors	16
DNF	Alec Mildren	1	Cooper T51 Maserati	AG Mildren Pty ltd	12
DNF	Bill Patterson	9	Cooper T51 Coventry Climax FPF	Bill Patterson Motors	11
DNF	Graham Hill	5	BRM P48	Owen Racing Organisation	10
DNF	John Roxburgh	18	Cooper T45 Coventry Climax FPF	J Roxburgh	10
DNF	Noel Hall	15	Cooper T51 Coventry Climax FPF	Ecurie Hall	7
DNF	Lex Davison	4	Aston Martin DBR4/250	AN Davison	6

=== Notes ===
- Pole Position: Stirling Moss (Lotus 18 Coventry Climax FPF), 1:39.3
- Weather: Hot (41 degrees C)
- Race distance: 45 laps (101.25 miles, 163 km)
- Entries: 17
- Starters: 14
- Finishers: 5
- Winner's race time: 1 hr 16 min 33.9 sec
- Fastest lap: Stirling Moss (Lotus 18 Coventry Climax FPF) : 1:40.3
