= 1961 Australian Grand Prix =

- Race 5 of 5 in 1961 Australian Drivers' Championship

Race details
- Date: 9 October 1961
- Location: Mallala Race Circuit, Mallala, South Australia
- Course: Permanent racing facility
- Course length: 3.38 km (2.1 miles)
- Distance: 50 laps, 168.95 km (105 miles)
- Weather: Sunny

Pole position
Driver	(Australia) Bill Patterson	Cooper-Climax
- Time: 1'42.0

Fastest lap
Drivers	(Australia) Bill Patterson	Cooper-Climax
	(Australia) Lex Davison	Cooper-Climax
- Time: 1'44

Podium
First	(Australia) Lex Davison	Cooper-Climax
Second	(Australia) Bib Stillwell	Cooper-Climax
Third	(Australia) David McKay	Cooper-Climax

The 1961 Australian Grand Prix was a Formula Libre motor race held at the newly completed Mallala Race Circuit in South Australia on 9 October 1961. The race, which was Round 5 of the 1961 Australian Drivers' Championship, had 17 starters.

The race was the twenty sixth Australian Grand Prix and would be the last to be held in South Australia until the first Formula One World Championship Australian Grand Prix was staged at the new Adelaide Parklands Circuit in 1985. Lex Davison won his fourth and final AGP setting a record for wins that still stands today, having only been equalled by Michael Schumacher. David McKay actually crossed the finish line first but had been assigned a one-minute penalty, for a jumped start, which relegated him to third position behind Davison and Bib Stillwell.

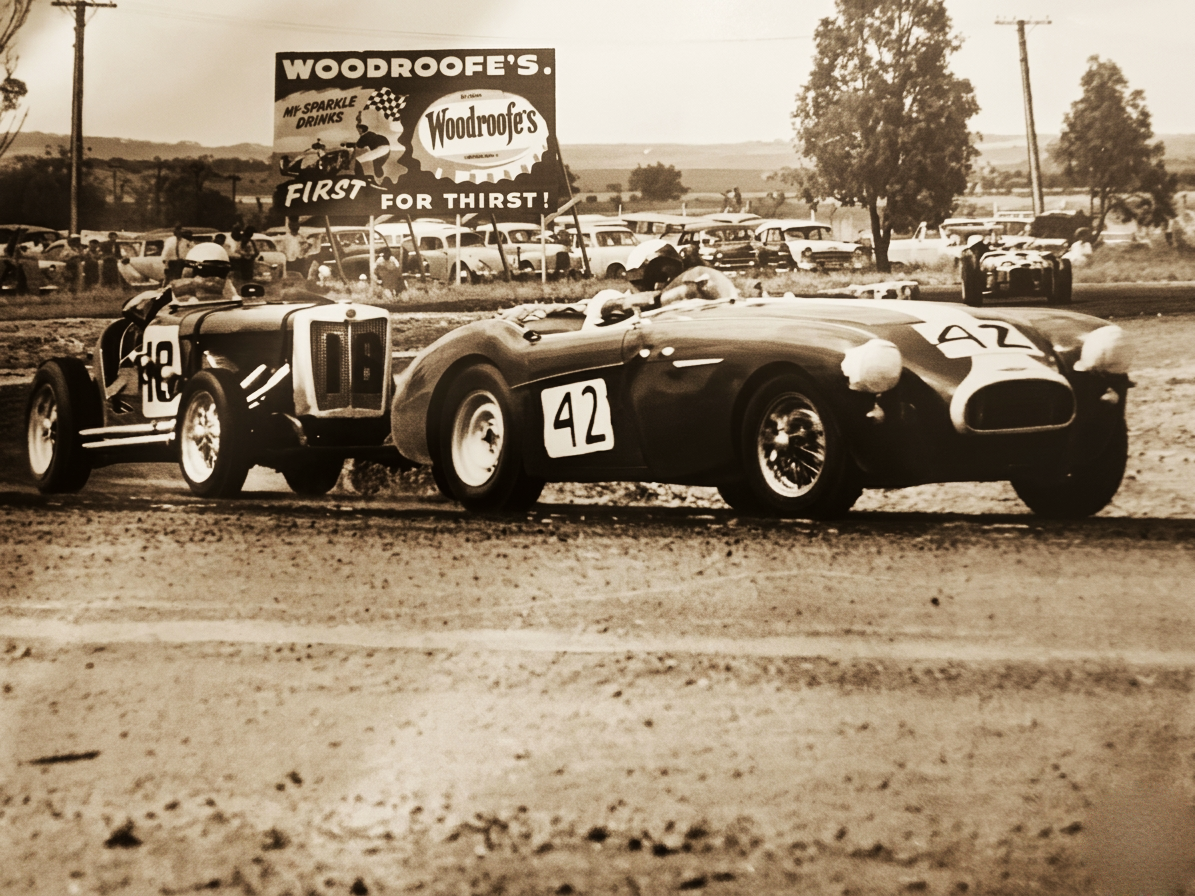
L. Kakoschke (#42 Austin-Healey) and Steve Tillett (#18 MG TC) at the 1961 Australian Grand Prix meeting. Kakoschke was not entered in the Grand Prix. Tillett was entered for the race but did not start.

Davison's Australian Grand Prix victory would be the last for a domestically based Australian until Frank Matich won the 1970 AGP at Warwick Farm in Sydney driving a McLaren M10B Formula 5000 car, although British-based Australian Jack Brabham had won the AGP in both 1963 and 1964.

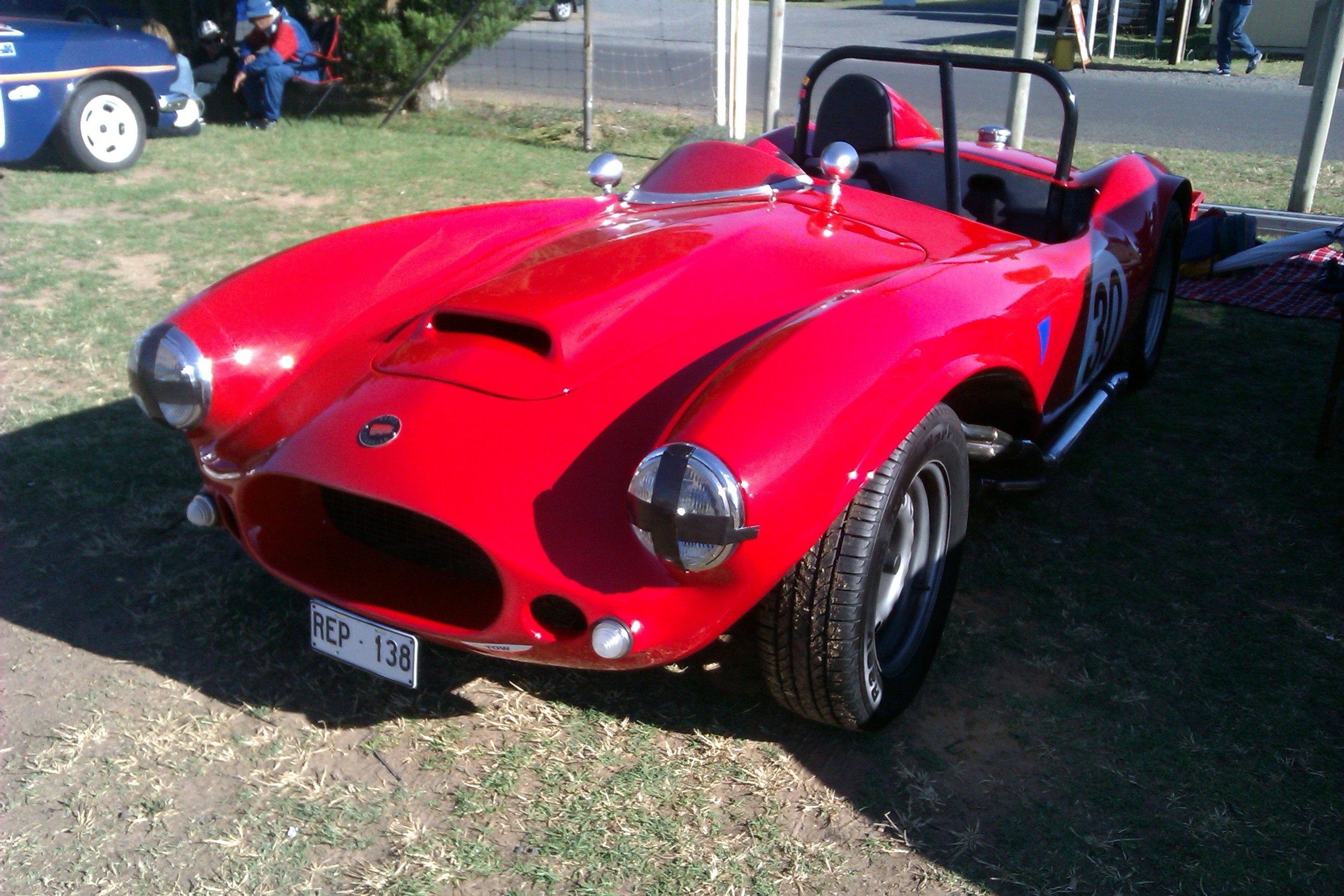
The Ricardian which was driven by John Newmarch in the 1961 Australian Grand Prix. The car is pictured at Mallala in 2012

== Classification ==
Results as follows.

Pos	No.	Driver	Entrant	Car / Engine	Laps	Time
1	4	(Australia) Lex Davison	B.S. Stillwell	Cooper T51 / Coventry Climax FPF 2.2L	50	1h 29m 01s
2	6	(Australia) Bib Stillwell	B.S. Stillwell	Cooper T55 / Coventry Climax FPF 2.5L	50	1h 29m 42s
3	14	(Australia) David McKay	Scuderia Veloce	Cooper T51 / Coventry Climax FPF 2.5L	50	1h 30m 05s
4	9	(Australia) Bill Patterson	Bill Patterson Motors P/L	Cooper T51 / Coventry Climax FPF 2.5L	48	
5	15	(Australia) Murray Trenberth	M Trenberth	Alta / Holden 2.5L	46	
6	20	(Australia) Eddie Clay	E Clay	Cooper T23 / Bristol 2.2L	45	
7	26	(Australia) Alan Jack	Briefield Motors	Cooper T39 / Coventry Climax FWB 1.5L	48	
8	45	(Australia) Trevor Ellis	T Ellis	Austin 8 Special / Austin Supercharged 0.9L	38	
9	16	(Australia) Mel McEwin	M McEwin	Tornado Mk II / Chevrolet 4.6L	35	
10	60	(Australia) Peter Wilkinson	P Wilkinson	Elfin Steamliner / Ford 1.2L	35	
Ret	5	(Australia) John Youl	Scuderia Veloce	Cooper T51 / Coventry Climax FPF 2.5L	46	Exhaustion
Ret	8	(Australia) Keith Rilstone	K Rilstone	Zephyr Special / Ford 2.3L	33	
Ret	19	(Australia) Doug Whiteford	Bill Patterson Motors P/L	Cooper T51 / Coventry Climax FPF 2.5L	30	Engine
Ret	11	(Australia) John Ampt	J Ampt	Cooper T38 / Jaguar 3.8L	25	
Ret	30	(Australia) John Newmarch	J Bruggeman	Ricardian / Holden 2.4L	14	
Ret	56	(Australia) Helene Bittner	H Bittner	Vitesse / Ford 100E 1.2L	1	Gearbox
Ret	3	(Australia) Laurie Whitehead	L Whitehead	Ausper T2 / Ford 1.0L	0	
DNS	2	(Australia) Stan Jones	Stan Jones Motors Pty Ltd	Cooper T51 / Coventry Climax FPF 2.5L		Engine
DNS	29	(Australia) Garrie Cooper	Elfin Sports Cars	Elfin Formula Junior / Ford 1.1L		Gearbox
DNS	44	(Australia) Dud Dansie	Bakewell Bridge Motors	BBM rotary valve special / Holden - Dunstan Rotary Valve		
DNS	18	(Australia) Steve Tillett	S. D. Tillett	MG TC		

== Notes ==
- Pole Position: Bill Patterson - 1:42.0
- Fastest Lap: Bill Patterson / Lex Davison - 1:44.0

Preceded by 1960 Australian Grand Prix	Australian Grand Prix; 1961	Succeeded by 1962 Australian Grand Prix
