= 1962 Australian Drivers' Championship =

Motor racing competition

Seasons
- ← 1961 1963 →

The 1962 Australian Drivers' Championship was a CAMS sanctioned motor racing title for drivers of Formula Libre racing cars. The winner of the title, which was the sixth Australian Drivers' Championship, was awarded the 1962 CAMS Gold Star.

The championship was won by Bib Stillwell driving a Cooper T53 Coventry Climax FPF.

== Schedule ==
The championship was contested over a six race series.

Round	Race name	Circuit	State	Date	Winning driver	Car	Entrant
1	South Pacific Championship	Longford	Tasmania	5 March	John Surtees	Cooper T53 Coventry Climax	Bowmaker - Yeoman Credit
2	Craven A Bathurst 100	Mount Panorama Circuit, Bathurst	New South Wales	23 April	Bib Stillwell	Cooper T53 Coventry Climax	B. S. Stillwell
3	Queensland Road Race Championship	Lowood	Queensland	3 June	Greg Cusack	Cooper T51 Coventry Climax	Scuderia Veloce
4	Victorian Road Racing Championship	Sandown Park	Victoria	16 September	Lex Davison	Cooper T53 Coventry Climax	Ecurie Australie
5	Advertiser Trophy	Mallala	South Australia	8 October	Bib Stillwell	Cooper T53 Coventry Climax	B. S. Stillwell
6	Australian Grand Prix	Caversham	Western Australia	18 November	Bruce McLaren	Cooper T62 Coventry Climax	Bruce McLaren

== Points system ==
Championship points were awarded on a 12-7-5-3-2-1 basis for the six best placed Australian license holders. Each driver could count his/her results from the Australian Grand Prix plus the best four results from the remaining races. Ties in the award were determined by the relevant drivers placings in the Australian Grand Prix.

== Results ==
Position	Driver	Car	Entrant	Lon.	Bat.	Low.	San.	Mal.	Cav.	Total
1	Bib Stillwell	Cooper T53 Coventry Climax FPF	B. S. Stillwell	7	12	-	7	12	7	45
2	John Youl	Cooper T51 Coventry Climax FPF; Cooper T55 Coventry Climax FPF	Scuderia Veloce	2	-	-	-	7	12	21
3	Bill Patterson	Cooper T51 Coventry Climax FPF	Bill Patterson Motors	3	5	-	5	-	5	18
4	Greg Cusack	Cooper T51 Coventry Climax FPF	Scuderia Veloce	-	3	12	3	-	-	18
5	David McKay	Cooper T53 Coventry Climax FPF	Scuderia Veloce	5	7	-	-	5	-	17
6	Lex Davison	Cooper T53 Coventry Climax FPF	Ecurie Australie		1	-	12	-	-	13
7	Jack Brabham	Cooper T55 Coventry Climax FPF	Ecurie Vitesse	12	-	-	-	-	-	12
8	Bryan Thomson	Cooper T51 Coventry Climax FPF S/C	Ecurie Shepparton	-	-	7	2	-	-	9
9	Tom Ross	Lotus 20 Ford	T. Ross	-	-	5	-	-	-	5
10	Arnold Glass	BRM P48 Buick	Capitol Motors Pty Ltd	-	-	-	-	-	3	3
11	Clive Nolan	Lotus 20 Ford	Clive Nolan Motors	-	-	3	-	-	-	3
=	Andy Brown	Elfin FJ Ford	Autocourse Elfin	-	-	-	-	3	-	3
13	Syd Negus	Cooper T20 Repco Holden	Syd Negus	-	-	-	-	-	2	2
14	Alwyn Rose	Dalro Jaguar Mk II	A. Rose	-	2	-	-	-	-	2
=	Roy Morris	Elfin FJ Climax Climax FWA	R. Morris	-	-	2	-	-	-	2
=	Bill Pile	Cooper Mk. V Climax Climax FWA	W. Pile	-	-	-	-	2	-	2
17	Ted Edwards	TS Special	E. Edwards	-	-	-	-	-	1	1
18	Ron Marshall	Cooper T51 (Replica) Coventry Climax FPF	R. Marshall	1	-	-	-	-	-	1
=	Ron Halpin	Gremlin FJ Ford	Gold Coast Auto	-	-	1	-	-	-	1
=	Garrie Cooper	Elfin FJ Ford	Elfin Sports Cars	-	-	-	-	1	-	1

Note:

- Patterson was awarded third place in the championship due to his superior placing in the Australian Grand Prix.
- English driver John Surtees (Cooper T53 Coventry Climax FPF) was not awarded points for his victory in the Longford race
- New Zealand driver Angus Hyslop (Cooper T53 Coventry Climax FPF) was not awarded points for his fourth place in the Longford race
- New Zealand driver Bruce McLaren (Cooper T62 Coventry Climax FPF) was not awarded points for his victory in the Australian Grand Prix
