= 1961 Craven A Gold Star =

Layout of the Mount Panorama Circuit (1938–1986)

The 1961 Craven A Gold Star was a motor race staged at the Mount Panorama Circuit near Bathurst in New South Wales, Australia on 3 April 1961. The race was contested over 19 laps at a total distance of approximately 75 miles and it was Round 2 of the 1961 Australian Drivers' Championship.

The race was won by Bill Patterson driving a Cooper T51 Climax.

== Results ==
Pos	No	Entrant	Driver	Car	Race Time/DNF	Laps
1	9	Bill Patterson Motors	Bill Patterson	Cooper T51 Climax	48:36.9	19
2	4	Stan Jones Motors Pty Ltd	Stan Jones	Cooper T51 Climax	49:14.3	19
3	6	B.S. Stillwell	Bib Stillwell	Cooper T51 Climax	49:32.8	19
4	7	Capitol Motors Pty Ltd	Arnold Glass	Cooper T51 Maserati	50:02.3	19
5	1	A.G. Mildren Pty Ltd	Alec Mildren	Cooper T51 Maserati	50:44.7	26
6	14	Scuderia Veloce	David McKay	Cooper T51 Climax	48:44.4	10
7	71	Ecurie Hall	Noel Hall	Cooper T51 Climax	48:50.4	10
8	20	G.A. Scott	Glyn Scott	Cooper T43 Climax	49:03.5	9
9	3	Jack Myers	Jack Myers	Cooper-Thunderbird MkIV Triumph	Retired	1
