= 1958 Australian Grand Prix =

- Race 7 of 9 in 1958 Australian Drivers' Championship

Race details
- Date: 6 October 1958
- Location: Mount Panorama Circuit, Bathurst, New South Wales
- Course: Temporary road circuit
- Course length: 6.12 km (3.84 miles)
- Distance: 30 laps, 183.6 km (115.1 miles)
- Weather: Sunny

Pole position
Driver	(Australia) Ted Gray	Tornado-Chevrolet

Fastest lap
Driver	(Australia) Ted Gray	Tornado-Chevrolet
- Time: 2:45.4

Podium
First	(Australia) Lex Davison	Ferrari
Second	(Australia) Ern Seeliger	Maybach-Chevrolet
Third	(Australia) Tom Hawkes	Cooper-Holden

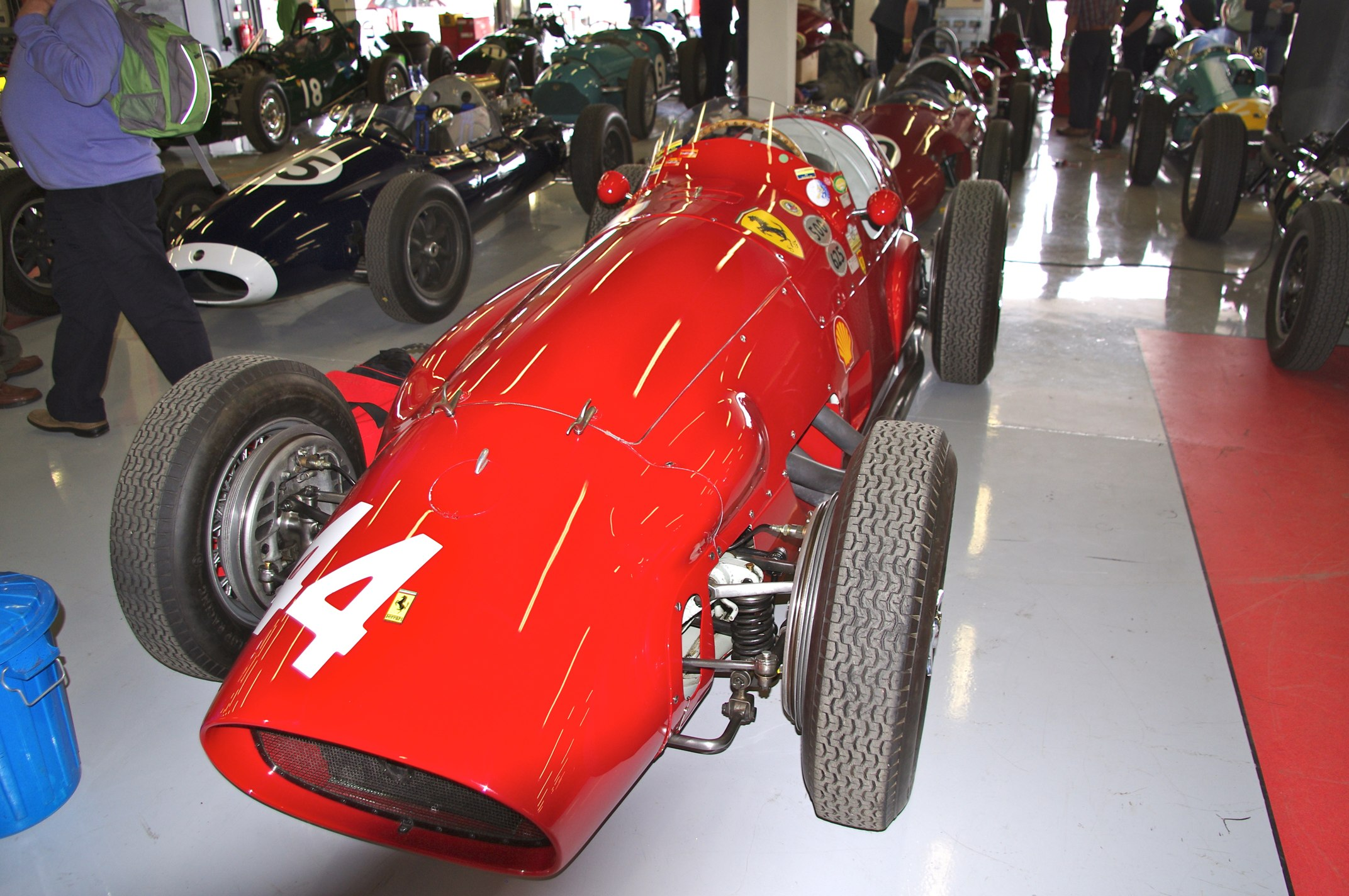
Lex Davison won the race driving a Ferrari similar to that pictured above

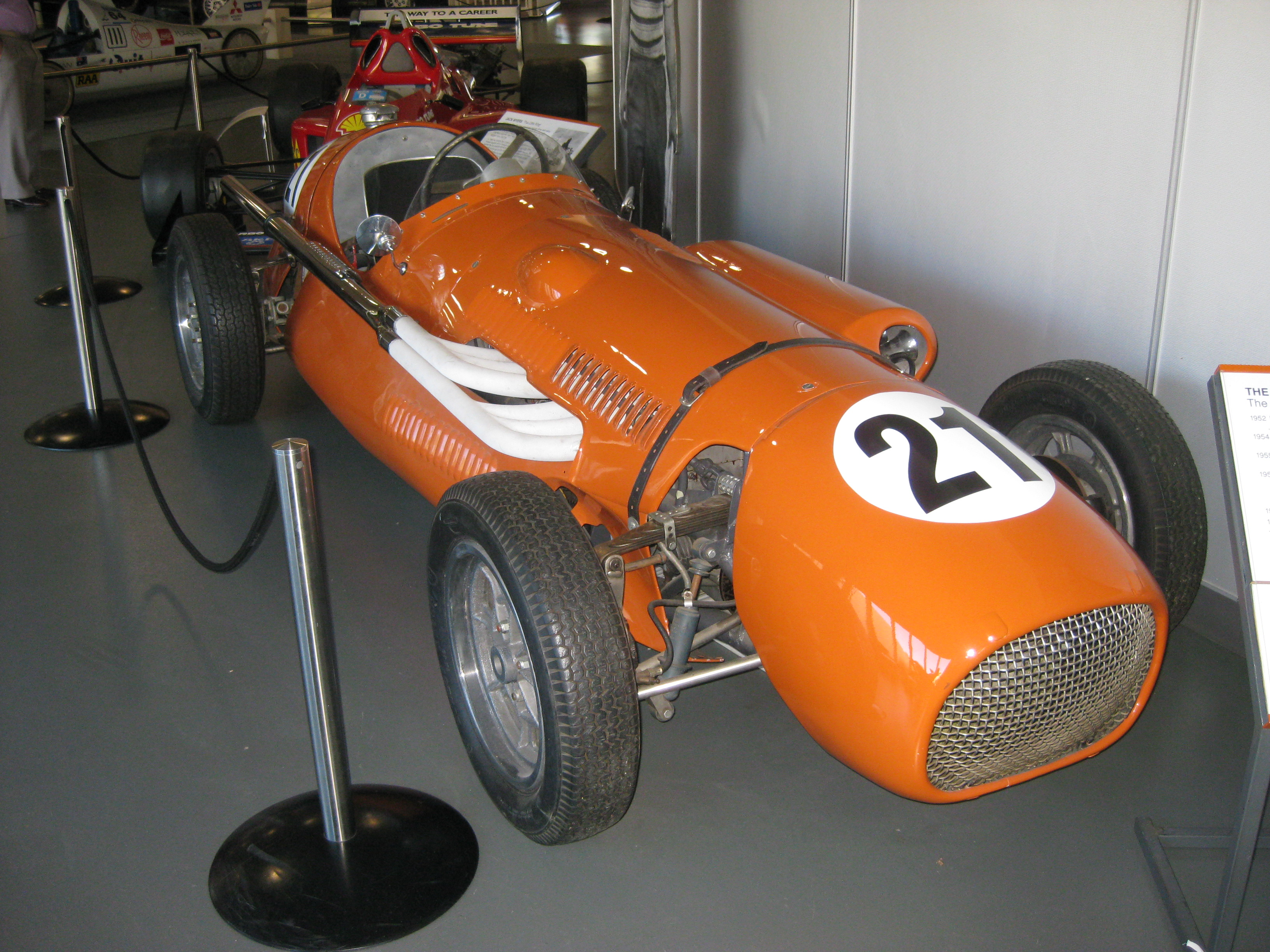
The WM Special was driven to 10th place in the 1958 Australian Grand Prix by its builder, Jack Myer

The 1958 Australian Grand Prix was a motor race for Formula Libre racing cars, held at the Mount Panorama Circuit, near Bathurst in New South Wales, Australia on 6 October 1958. The race had 26 starters. It was the first Australian Grand Prix to specifically exclude sports cars from the entry.

The race was the 23rd Australian Grand Prix and the seventh race of the 1958 Australian Drivers' Championship. To Date this was the last time the Australian Grand Prix was held on The Mountain.

The race was won by Lex Davison driving a Ferrari. It was his third Australian Grand Prix win, equalling the record held jointly by Bill Thompson and Doug Whiteford.

== Classification ==
Results as follows.

Pos	No.	Driver	Car	Entrant	Laps	Time	Pts
1	12	(Australia) Lex Davison	Ferrari 625 / Ferrari 3.0L	Ecurie Australie	30	1h 25m 18s	8
2	1	(Australia) Ern Seeliger	Maybach III / Chevrolet 4.6L	Stan Jones Motors Pty Ltd	30	1h 27m 20s	5
3	46	(Australia) Tom Hawkes	Cooper T23 / Holden 2.3L	Ecurie Corio	30	1h 27m 26s	3
4	5	(New Zealand) Merv Neil	Cooper T45 / Climax 1.7L	M Neil	29		#
5	9	(Australia) Curley Brydon	Ferrari 125 F1 / Chevrolet 4.7L	AH Brydon	28		1
6	33	(Australia) Len Lukey	Lukey / Bristol 2.2L	Lukey Mufflers Pty Ltd	28		
7	10	(Australia) Alec Mildren	Cooper T43 / Climax FPE 2.0L	AG Mildren Pty Ltd	28		
8	19	(Australia) Ray Walmsley	Alfa Romeo Tipo B / Chevrolet 4.7L	R Wamsley	28		
9	22	(New Zealand) Tom Clark	Ferrari 555 Super Squalo / Ferrari 3.4L	T Clark	28		
10	3	(Australia) Jack Myers	WM Special / Holden 2.4L	J Myers	27		
11	56	(Australia) Bill Reynolds	Orlando MG / MG 1.5L	R Orlando	22		
12	32	(Australia) Keith Moy	MG NE / Holden 2.4L	K Moy	19		
13	11	(Australia) Gordon Stewart	MG Special / MG 1.5L	G Stewart	18		
Ret	4	(Australia) Stan Jones	Maserati 250F / Maserati 2.5L	Stan Jones Motors Pty Ltd	26		
Ret	21	(Australia) Syd Negus	Cooper T20 / Bristol 2.0L	Syd Negus	24		
Ret	39	(Australia) Ted Gray	Tornado II / Chevrolet 4.6L	Lou Abrahams	24		
Ret	25	(Australia) Ray Gibbs	Cooper T23 / Holden 2.4L	R Gibbs	18		
Ret	20	(Australia) Alf Harvey	Maserati 4CLT / O.S.C.A. 4.5L	A Harvey	16		
Ret	41	(Australia) Frank Walters	So Cal Special / Ford 4.4L	F Walters	10		
Ret	62	(Australia) John Schroder	Nota Consul / Ford 1.5L	J Schroder	10		
Ret	45	(Australia) Alan Ferguson	MG TC / Holden 2.4L	A Ferguson	8		
Ret	15	(Australia) Barry Collerson	MG TA / MG 1.5L	B Collerson	6		
Ret	48	(Australia) Bill Cooke	Peugeot Special / Peugeot 1.5L	W Cooke	6		
Ret	58	(Australia) Ern Tadgell	Sabakat (Lotus 12) / Climax FPE 1.5L	Tadgell Aviation	4		
Ret	14	(Australia) Jack Robinson	Jaguar Special / Jaguar 3.4L	J Robinson	2		
DSQ	44	(Australia) Jack Neal	Maserati 4C / Maserati 1.5L	J Neal	18		
DNS	59	(Australia) Bill Patterson	Cooper T43 / Climax 1.7L	Bill Patterson Motors Pty Ltd			
DNS	71	(Australia) Noel Hall	Ralt Mk.4 / Vincent 1.0L	O Hall			

'# New Zealander Merv Neal was not eligible to score points in the Australian Drivers Championship

== 1958 Australian Drivers' Championship standings after the race ==
The top five standings in the 1958 Australian Drivers' Championship after the Australian Grand Prix were:

Pos	Driver	Points
1	(Australia) Stan Jones	23
2	(Australia) Len Lukey	20
3	(Australia) Alec Mildren	18
4	(Australia) Ted Gray	13
5	(Australia) Lex Davison	8

== Notes & references ==
Preceded by 1958 Lowood Trophy	Australian Drivers' Championship; 1958 season	Succeeded by 1958 Melbourne Grand Prix
Preceded by 1957 Australian Grand Prix	Australian Grand Prix; 1958	Succeeded by 1959 Australian Grand Prix
