= 1960 Australian Drivers' Championship =

Motor racing competition

Seasons
- ← 1959 1961 →

The 1960 Australian Drivers' Championship was a CAMS sanctioned national motor racing title for drivers of Formula Libre cars. The title was contested over a seven race series with the winner awarded the 1960 CAMS Gold Star. It was the 4th Australian Drivers' Championship.

The series was won by Alec Mildren of the Australian Capital Territory, driving his Maserati powered Cooper T51. Mildren won four of the seven races, including the 1960 Australian Grand Prix at Lowood and placed second at Longford to finish 14 points ahead of Bib Stillwell (Cooper T51-Climax). Stillwell and third placed driver Bill Patterson (Cooper T51-Climax) each won one race, at Port Wakefield and Phillip Island respectively, as did Jack Brabham, who won at Longford in his Cooper T51-Climax.

== Race calendar ==
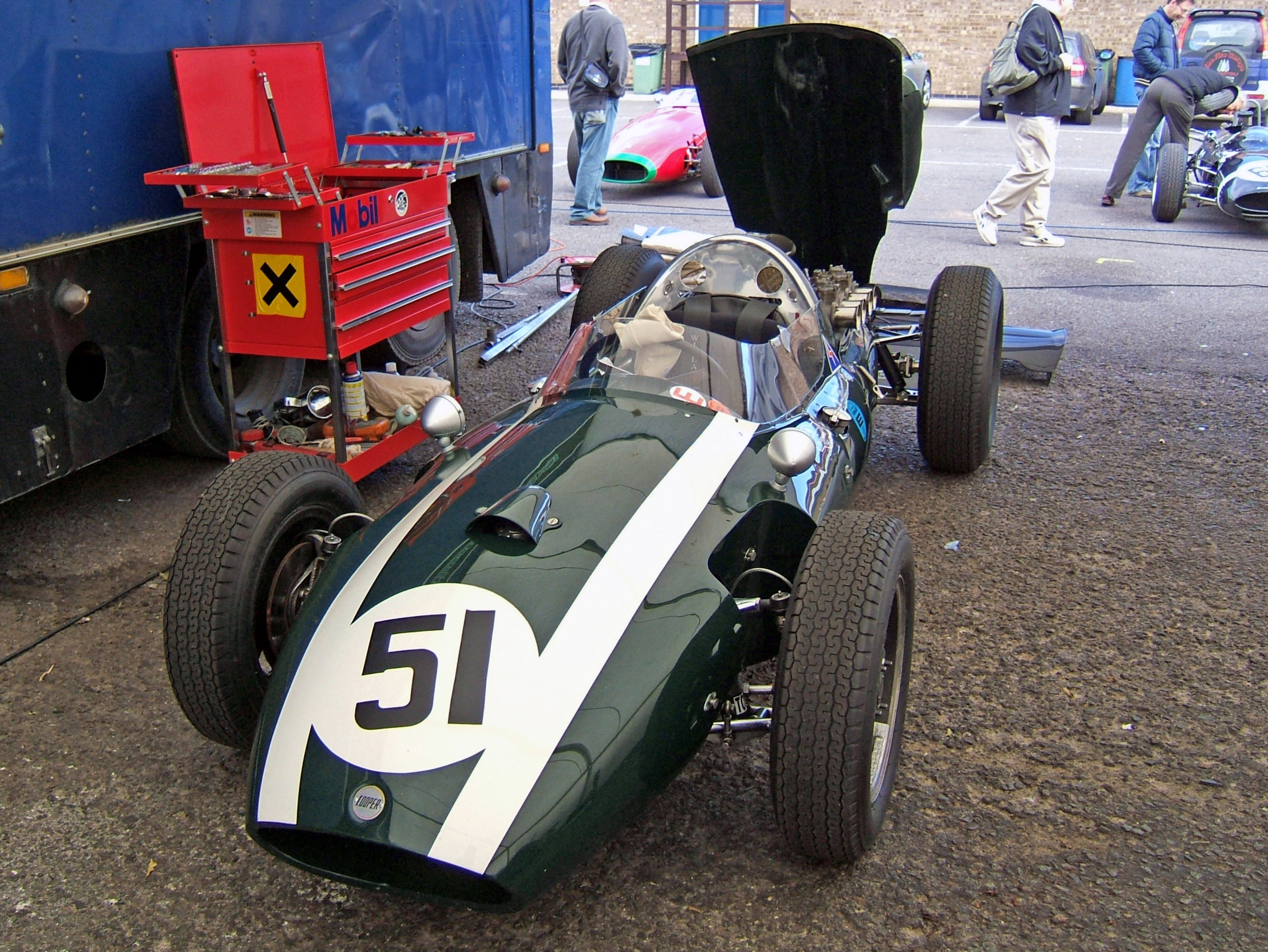
The championship was dominated by various examples of the Cooper T51. The image above is from 2007

The championship was contested over a seven race series.

Race	Circuit	State	Date	Winning driver	Car
Longford Trophy Race	Longford	Tasmania	5 March	Jack Brabham	Cooper T51 Climax
Bathurst 100	Bathurst	New South Wales	18 April	Alec Mildren	Cooper T51 Maserati
Australian Grand Prix	Lowood	Queensland	12 June	Alec Mildren	Cooper T51 Maserati
Queensland Road Racing Championships	Lowood	Queensland	4 September	Alec Mildren	Cooper T51 Maserati
"The Advertiser" Trophy	Port Wakefield	South Australia	10 October	Bib Stillwell	Cooper T51 Climax
Western Australian Road Racing Championships	Caversham	Western Australia	5 November	Alec Mildren	Cooper T51 Maserati
Phillip Island Trophy Race	Phillip Island	Victoria	11 December	Bill Patterson	Cooper T51 Climax

== Points system ==
Championship points were awarded on a 12-7-5-3-2-1 basis for the first six places at each race, with only Australian license holders eligible. The championship was decided using the results of the Australian Grand Prix and the best five of the other six races.

== Points table ==
Pos.	Driver	Car	Entrant	Longford	Bathurst	Lowood (AGP)	Lowood	Pt Wakfld	Cavrshm	Phil. Is	Total
1	Alec Mildren	Cooper T51 Maserati	AG Mildren Pty Ltd	7	12	12	12	-	12	-	55
2	Bib Stillwell	Cooper T51 Climax	BS Stillwell	5	-	5	7	12	7	5	41
3	Bill Patterson	Cooper T51 Climax	Bill Patterson Motors P/L	-	5	-	3	-	-	12	20
4	Jack Brabham	Cooper T51 Climax	Ecurie Vitesse	12	-	-	-	-	-	-	12
4	Lex Davison	Aston Martin DBR4/300	Ecurie Australie	-	-	7	5	-	-	-	12
4	Arnold Glass	Maserati 250F	Capitol Motors Pty Ltd	3	7	1	1	-	-	-	12
7	Jon Leighton	Cooper T45 Climax; Nota-Ford	Scuderia Birchwood	2	-	3	2	2	-	2	11
8	Austin Miller	Cooper T51 Climax	A Miller	-	1	-	-	-	-	7	8
9	John Youl	Cooper T51 Climax	J Youl	-	-	-	-	7	-	-	7
10	Noel Hall	Cooper T51 Climax	O Hall	-	3	2	-	-	-	-	5
10	Derek Jolly	Lotus XV Climax	DE Jolly	-	-	-	-	-	5	-	5
10	Keith Rilstone	Zephyr Special-Ford	K Rilstone	-	-	-	-	5	-	-	5
13	Murray Trenberth	Alta Holden	M Trenberth	-	-	-	-	3	-	-	3
13	Doug Whiteford	Cooper T51 Climax	B S Stillwell	-	-	-	-	-	-	3	3
13	John Roxburgh	Cooper T45 Climax	JB Roxburgh	-	2	-	-	-	-	1	3
13	Doug Green	Ferrari 500	Riemann Motors	-	-	-	-	-	3	-	3
17	Jack Ayers	Alta GP-2	J Ayres	-	-	-	-	-	2	-	2
18	Glynn Scott	Cooper T43 Climax	Glyn Scott Motors	1	-	-	-	-	-	-	1
18	Ray Barfield	Aston Martin DB3S	R Barfield	-	-	-	-	-	1	-	1
18	Kevin Fuss	JCW Special	K Fuss	-	-	-	-	1	-	-	1
