= 1960 Australian Grand Prix =

- Race 3 of 7 in 1960 Australian Drivers' Championship
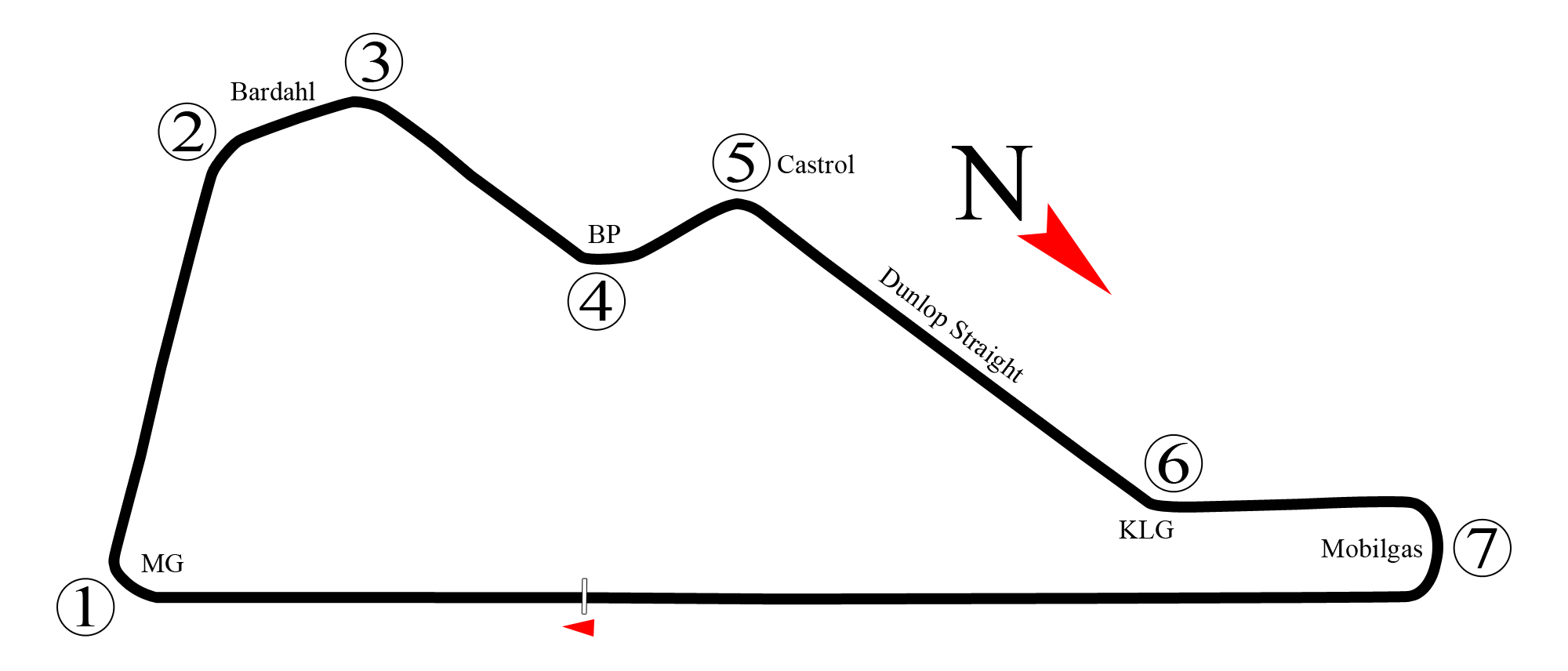

Race details
- Date: 12 June 1960
- Location: Lowood circuit, Tarampa, Queensland
- Course: Permanent racing facility
- Course length: 4.54 km (2.82 miles)
- Distance: 36 laps, 163.44 km (101.52 miles)
- Weather: Sunny

Pole position
| Driver | (Australia) Alec Mildren | Cooper-Maserati |
- Time: 1'45.9

Fastest lap
| Driver | (Australia) Lex Davison | Aston Martin |
- Time: 1'44

Podium
| First | (Australia) Alec Mildren | Cooper-Maserati |
| Second | (Australia) Lex Davison | Aston Martin |
| Third | (Australia) Bib Stillwell | Cooper-Climax |

The 1960 Australian Grand Prix was a motor race held at Lowood in Queensland, Australia on 12 June 1960. The race, which was run to Formula Libre, had 16 starters.

It was the twenty fifth Australian Grand Prix. Alec Mildren won his only AGP, which was also the second AGP victory for a rear-engined racing car. Mildren eschewed the more usual Coventry Climax FPF engine in favour of a Maserati sports car unit to power his Cooper T51, one of many competitors at the time who tried sports car engines in racing car chassis. Davison's Aston Martin DBR4 too had a sports car engine replacing the 2.5-litre powerplant, this being 3.0 litre unit from a DBR1.

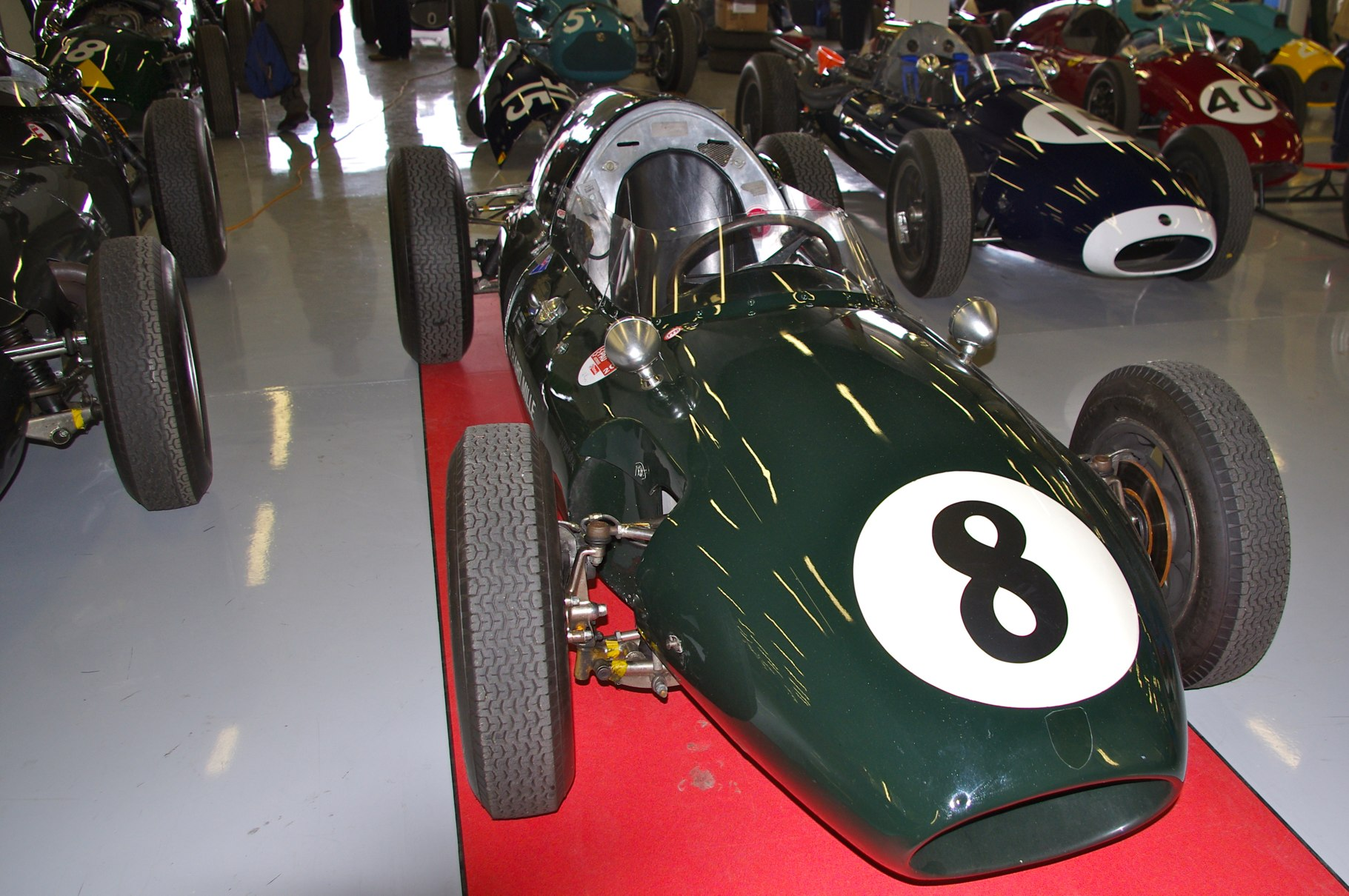
Alec Mildren won the 1960 Australian Grand Prix driving a Cooper T51, similar to the example depicted above

== Classification ==
Results as follows.

| Pos | No. | Driver | Car | Entrant | Laps | Time |
|---|---|---|---|---|---|---|
| 1 | 2 | (Australia) Alec Mildren | Cooper T51 / Maserati 2.5L | A.G. Mildren Pty. Ltd. | 36 | 1h 4m 35.05s |
| 2 | 3 | (Australia) Lex Davison | Aston Martin DBR4/300 / Aston Martin 3.0L | A.N. Davison | 36 | 1h 4m 35.55s |
| 3 | 16 | (Australia) Bib Stillwell | Cooper T51 / Coventry Climax FPF 2.2L | B.S. Stillwell | 36 | |
| 4 | 70 | (Australia) Jon Leighton | Cooper T45 / Coventry Climax FPF 2.0L | Scuderia Birchwood | 35 | |
| 5 | 71 | (Australia) Noel Hall | Cooper T51 / Coventry Climax FPF 2.0L | Ecurie Hall | 35 | |
| 6 | 8 | (Australia) Arnold Glass | Maserati 250F / Maserati 2.5L | Capitol Motors | 35 | |
| 7 | 20 | (Australia) Glynn Scott | Cooper T43 / Coventry Climax FPF 1.7L | G. A. Scott | | |
| 8 | 4 | (Australia) Charlie Whatmore | Lotus Eleven / Coventry Climax FPF 1.5L | C. Whatmore & Co. | | |
| 9 | 33 | (Australia) Mel McEwin | Tornado II / Chevrolet 4.6L | M. W. McEwin | | |
| 10 | 49 | (Australia) Noel Barnes | MG TC Special / MG 1.5L | N. F. Barnes | | |
| ? | 37 | (Australia) Keith Russell | MG TC Special / MG 1.5L | D. K. Russell | | |
| ? | 32 | (Australia) Max Williams | MG TC Special / MG 1.5L | Ecurie Lismore | | |
| ? | 10 | (Australia) George Jamieson | Lotus Eleven / Coventry Climax FWA 1.1L | Rockhampton Car Sales | | |
| Ret | 87 | (Australia) Frank Matich | Lotus 15 / Coventry Climax FPF 2.5L | Leaton Motors (Sports Cars) Pty. Ltd. | 9 | |
| Ret | 18 | (Australia) Stan Jones | Maybach III / Chevrolet 4.6L | Moran Motors Pty. Ltd. | 4 | |
| Ret | 6 | (Australia) Joe Bonenti | MG TF Special / MG 1.5L | J. A. Bonetti | | |
| DNS | 7 | (Australia) Ern Tadgell | Sabakat / Lycoming O-480 7.9L aircraft engine | C. E. Tadgell | | |

== Notes ==
- Attendance: 25,000
- Pole position: Alec Mildren – 1'45.9
- Fastest lap: Lex Davison – 1'44.0, 97.7 mph, new lap record

| Preceded by 1959 Australian Grand Prix | Australian Grand Prix; 1960 | Succeeded by 1961 Australian Grand Prix |
