= 1964 Tasman Series =

International motor racing series contested in New Zealand and Australia

The 1964 Tasman Series was an international motor racing series contested in New Zealand and Australia over eight races beginning on 4 January and ending on 2 March. It was the first Tasman Series. The series, which was officially known as the Tasman Championship for Drivers, was organised jointly by the Association of New Zealand Car Clubs Inc. and the Confederation of Australian Motor Sport with the winning driver awarded the Tasman Cup. The championship was open to racing cars using unsupercharged engines of up to 2,500 c.c. capacity.

The inaugural series was a battle of the British-based expatriates with a two-car team led by Australian Jack Brabham and a two-car team of Coopers from Bruce McLaren Motor Racing, led by the New Zealander Bruce McLaren. Although Denny Hulme won the opening round of the series, McLaren took a trifecta of wins in New Zealand setting up the title win. When the teams moved to Australia, Brabham won the first three races, ensuring a thrilling finish, however Brabham was unable to better his score and therefore McLaren emerged as champion. The last round of the series at Longford was won by the Englishman, Graham Hill, securing sixth place in the final standings as a result. Brabham led the final race until the last laps before his car suffered a transmission failure.

The most successful of the local-based drivers was John Youl. Although the Cooper T55 he was driving was three-years old, he took the aging car to six top five finishes. Australian Bib Stillwell only completed in three races, twice beating Youl, including a second place in the Australian Grand Prix. Another competitive local was Frank Matich in his Repco Brabham BT7A, taking pole at Warwick Farm. Whilst leading, his suspension broke and he was forced to retire. With a further four retirements, Matich only finished one race, gaining a third place at Longford.

== Results and standings ==
=== Races ===
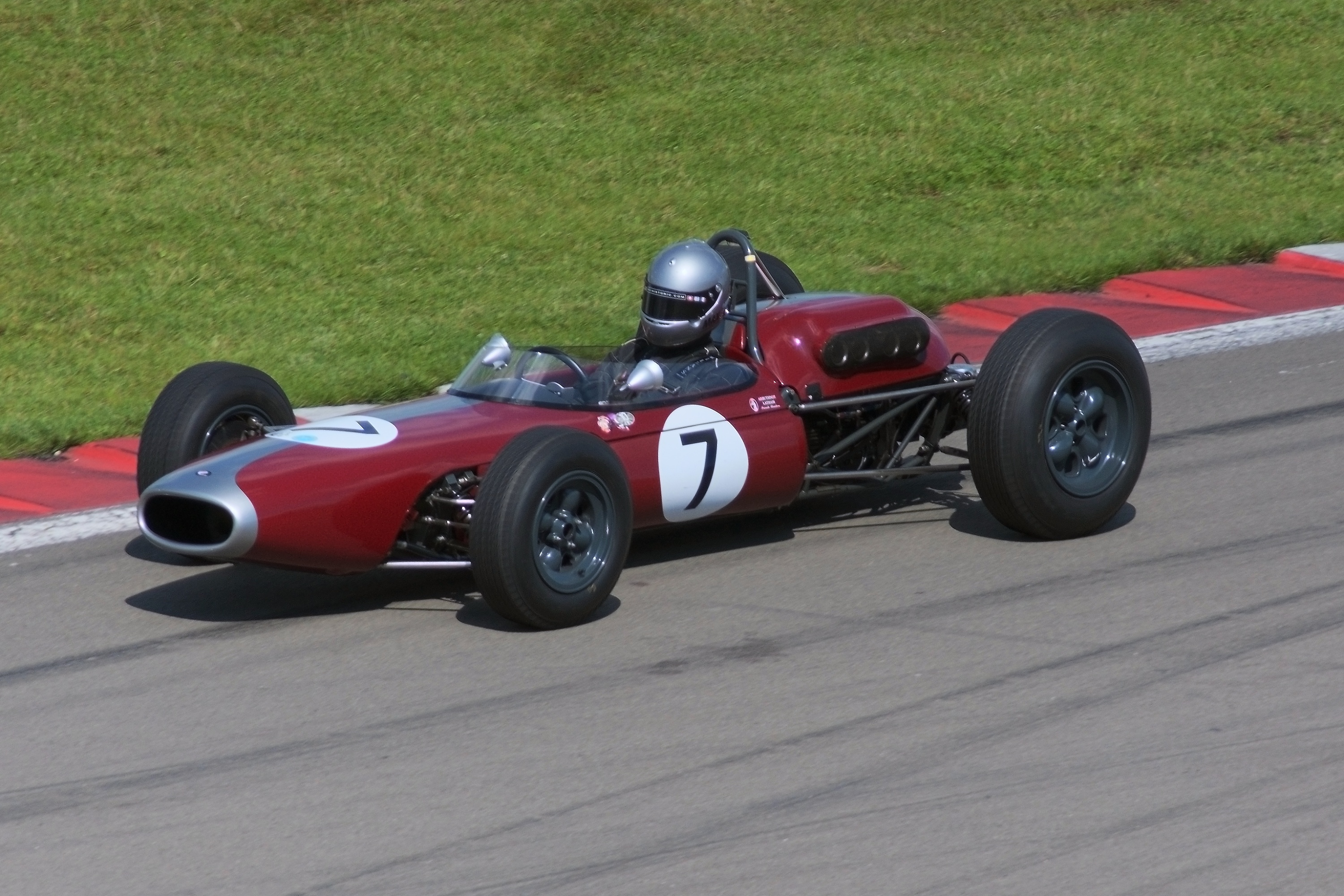
Jack Brabham won three of the eight races driving a Repco Brabham BT7A, similar to that pictured above

Round		Name	Circuit	Date	Winning driver	Winning car	Winning team	Report
New Zealand	1	Vic Hudson Memorial Race	Levin	4 January	(New Zealand) Denny Hulme	Repco Brabham BT4 Coventry Climax	Motor Racing Developments	Report
New Zealand	2	Eleventh New Zealand International Grand Prix	Pukekohe	11 January	(New Zealand) Bruce McLaren	Cooper T70 Coventry Climax	Bruce McLaren Motor Racing	Report
New Zealand	3	10th International Lady Wigram Trophy Race	Wigram	18 January	(New Zealand) Bruce McLaren	Cooper T70 Coventry Climax	Bruce McLaren Motor Racing	Report
New Zealand	4	Teretonga International	Teretonga	25 January	(New Zealand) Bruce McLaren	Cooper T70 Coventry Climax	Bruce McLaren Motor Racing	Report
Australia	5	29th Australian Grand Prix	Sandown	9 February	(Australia) Jack Brabham	Repco Brabham BT7A Coventry Climax	Ecurie Vitesse	Report
Australia	6	International 100 Race	Warwick Farm	16 February	(Australia) Jack Brabham	Repco Brabham BT7A Coventry Climax	Ecurie Vitesse	Report
Australia	7	Lakeside International 99	Lakeside	23 February	(Australia) Jack Brabham	Repco Brabham BT7A Coventry Climax	Ecurie Vitesse	Report
Australia	8	South Pacific Trophy	Longford	2 March	(United Kingdom) Graham Hill	Repco Brabham BT4 Coventry Climax	Scuderia Veloce	Report

=== Points system ===
Championship points were awarded at each race on the following basis:

Position	1st	2nd	3rd	4th	5th	6th
Points	9	6	4	3	2	1

Championship placings were determined by points won by drivers in the New Zealand Grand Prix and any two of the other three races held in New Zealand, plus the Australian Grand Prix and any two of the other three races held in Australia.

=== Standings ===
Pos	Driver	Car	Entrant	Lev	Puk	Wig	Ter	San	War	Lak	Lon	Pts
1	(New Zealand) Bruce McLaren	Cooper T70 Coventry Climax	Bruce McLaren Motor Racing	(3)	1	1	1	Ret	2	(3)	2	39 (47)
2	(Australia) Jack Brabham	Repco Brabham BT7A Coventry Climax	Motor Racing Developments; Ecurie Vitesse		Ret	2		1	1	1	Ret	33
3	(New Zealand) Denny Hulme	Repco Brabham BT4 Coventry Climax	Motor Racing Developments; Ecurie Vitesse	1	2	3	Ret	5	5	9		23
4	(United States) Timmy Mayer	Cooper T70 Coventry Climax	Bruce McLaren Motor Racing	2	3	8	2	4	3	Ret	DNS	23
5	(Australia) John Youl	Cooper T55 Coventry Climax	John Youl	4	4	4	DNS	3	Ret	2	5	21
6	(United Kingdom) Graham Hill	Repco Brabham BT4 Coventry Climax	Scuderia Veloce						4		1	12
7	(Australia) Bib Stillwell	Repco Brabham BT4 Coventry Climax	BS Stillwell					2	6		4	10
8	(New Zealand) Jim Palmer	Cooper T53 Coventry Climax	Jim Palmer	(6)	5	5	3	6	10		8	9 (10)
9	(New Zealand) Tony Shelly	Lotus 18/21 Coventry Climax; Lola Mk4A Coventry Climax	Shelley Motors Ltd; AL Shelley	5	6	(6)	4	8	7	5	7	8 (9)
10	(Australia) Frank Matich	Repco Brabham BT7A Coventry Climax	Total Team		Ret			Ret	Ret	Ret	3	4
11	(Australia) Frank Gardner	Repco Brabham BT6 Ford	Alec Mildren Racing Pty Ltd					10	13	4	9	3
12	(New Zealand) Bill Thomasen	Cooper T53 Coventry Climax	Corsair Racing Team	Ret	DNS		5					2
13	(New Zealand) Roly Levis	Lotus 22 Ford	RA Levis	7	9	10	6					1
13	(Australia) Lex Davison	Cooper T62 Coventry Climax	Ecurie Australie					Ret	8		6	1
13	(Australia) Glynn Scott	Lotus 27 Ford	Glyn Scott Motors					Ret	Ret	6		1
—	(New Zealand) Rex Flowers	Lotus 20B Ford	Flowers Transport	8	12	7	Ret		12	8		0
—	(New Zealand) Andy Buchanan	Brabham BT6 Ford	Wilson Motors Ltd	10	7	9						0
—	(Australia) Greg Cusack	Repco Brabham BT6 Ford	Scuderia Veloce						11	7	10	0
—	(Australia) Arnold Glass	Lotus 27 Ford	Capitol Motors					7	Ret	Ret	Ret	0
—	(New Zealand) Jim Boyd	Valour Ford	JA Malcolm		Ret		7					0
—	(New Zealand) Ken Sager	Lotus 20 Ford	JH Sager		11	11	8					0
—	(New Zealand) David Young	Cooper T59 Ford	David Young		8	Ret						0
—	(New Zealand) Neil Whittaker	Cooper T43 Coventry Climax		9								0
—	(Australia) David Walker	Repco Brabham BT2 Ford	David Walker					9	Ret	Ret	Ret	0
—	(Australia) Leo Geoghegan	Lotus 27 Ford	Total Team					Ret	9			0
—	(New Zealand) Dene Hollier	Cooper T52 Ford	Dene Hollyer Limited		10							0
—	(New Zealand) Peter Slocombe	Lotus 18 Ford		11								0
—	(Australia) Jack Hobden	Cooper T51 Coventry Climax	Louis Hobden								11	0
—	(Australia) Mel McEwin	Elfin Ford	Mel McEwin					Ret			12	0
—	(New Zealand) Chris Amon	Lola Mk4A Coventry Climax	Reg Parnell Racing	Ret	Ret	Ret	Ret					0
—	(Australia) Charlie Smith	Elfin Ford	CG Smith					Ret	Ret			0
—	(Australia) Jack Hunnam	Elfin Mono Ford	Jack Hunnan Motors					Ret	Ret			0
—	(Australia) Bill Patterson	Cooper T53 Coventry Climax	Bill Patterson Motors					Ret			Ret	0
—	(Australia) Tony Osborne	Cooper T53 Coventry Climax	AJR Osborne					Ret			Ret	0
—	(New Zealand) Bruce Abernethy	Cooper T41 Coventry Climax		Ret								0
—	(Australia) Doug Whiteford	Cooper T53 Coventry Climax	Bill Patterson Motors					Ret				0
—	(Australia) Keith Rilstone	Elfin Ford	KN Rilstone					Ret				0
—	(Australia) David Fletcher	Lola Mk5 Ford	DK Fletcher					Ret				0
—	(Australia) Wally Mitchell	MRD Brabham Ford	East Burwood Motors					Ret				0
—	(Australia) Lionel Ayers	Lotus 20 Ford								Ret		0
—	(New Zealand) Barry Porter	Lotus 15 Coventry Climax					DNS					0
—	(New Zealand) Ken Smith	Lola Mk2 Ford	M Smith	DNQ								0
Pos	Driver	Car	Entrant	Lev	Puk	Wig	Ter	San	War	Lak	Lon	Pts

Colour	Result
Gold	Winner
Silver	Second place
Bronze	Third place
Green	Points classification
Blue	Non-points classification
Blue	Non-classified finish (NC)
Purple	Retired, not classified (Ret)
Red	Did not qualify (DNQ)
Red	Did not pre-qualify (DNPQ)
Black	Disqualified (DSQ)
White	Did not start (DNS)
White	Withdrew (WD)
White	Race cancelled (C)
Blank	Did not practice (DNP)
Blank	Did not arrive (DNA)
Blank	Excluded (EX)
