= John Youl =

Australian racing driver

- Nationality: (Australia) Australian
- Born: 1932
- Died: 27 September 2009 Launceston, Tasmania, Australia
- Retired: 1964
- Relatives: See Youl family

1964 Tasman Series
- Years active: 1964
- Starts: 8
- Wins: 0
- Best finish: 5th in 1964

Previous series
- 1959–63: Australian Drivers' Champ.

John Youl (1932 – 27 September 2009) was an Australian motor racing driver, race track owner and prominent Tasmanian grazier.

Youl was best known for his driving in open wheel racing cars during the 1950s and 1960s, and by the 60's, was one of the most prominent Australians of this discipline. His career highlight came in 1962 when he finished second in the Australian Grand Prix behind international grand prix racer Bruce McLaren at the Caversham airfield circuit.

A twice runner-up in the CAMS Gold Star for the Australian Drivers' Championship, Youl raced in the inaugural Tasman Series in 1964 before stepping away from the sport as a competitor. He remained close to the sport however, developing Symmons Plains Raceway on part of the family's grazing land in northern Tasmania.

Youl was also a prominent member of the Tasmanian grazing community.

== Career results ==
Season	Series	Position	Car	Team
1960	Australian Drivers' Championship	9th	Cooper T51 Climax	
1961	Australian Drivers' Championship	6th	Cooper T51 Climax	
1962	Australian Drivers' Championship	2nd	Cooper T51 Climax; Cooper T55 Climax	Scuderia Veloce
1963	Australian Drivers' Championship	2nd	Cooper T51 Climax; Cooper Climax	
1964	Tasman Series	5th	Cooper Climax	

=== Complete Tasman Series results ===
Year	Car	1	2	3	4	5	6	7	8	Rank	Points
1964	Cooper T55	LEV; 4	PUK; 4	WIG; 4	TER; DNS	SAN; 3	WAR; Ret	LAK; 2	LON; 5	5th	21
