= 1957 Australian Grand Prix =

- Race 1 of 8 in 1957 Australian Drivers' Championship

Race details
- Date: 4 March 1957
- Location: Caversham, Western Australia
- Course: Permanent airfield circuit
- Course length: 3.621 km (2.25 miles)
- Distance: 70 laps, 253.47 km (157.5 miles)
- Weather: Very warm (104°F), sunny

Pole position
Driver	(Australia) Stan Jones	Maserati

Fastest lap
Driver	(Australia) Lex Davison	Ferrari
- Time: 1'34.8

Podium
First	(Australia) Lex Davison; (Australia) Bill Patterson	Ferrari
Second	(Australia) Stan Jones	Maserati
Third	(Australia) Jack Brabham	Cooper-Climax

The 1957 Australian Grand Prix was a Formula Libre motor race held at Caversham Circuit, Western Australia on 4 March 1957. The race had 24 starters.

It was the twenty second Australian Grand Prix. Lex Davison won his second AGP a victory he shared after using Bill Patterson as a relief driver. The extreme heat of the Western Australian summer saw several teams use two drivers over the 245 kilometre race distance.

The race was also the first ever round of an Australian Drivers' Championship, which was held for the first time in 1957.

== Classification ==
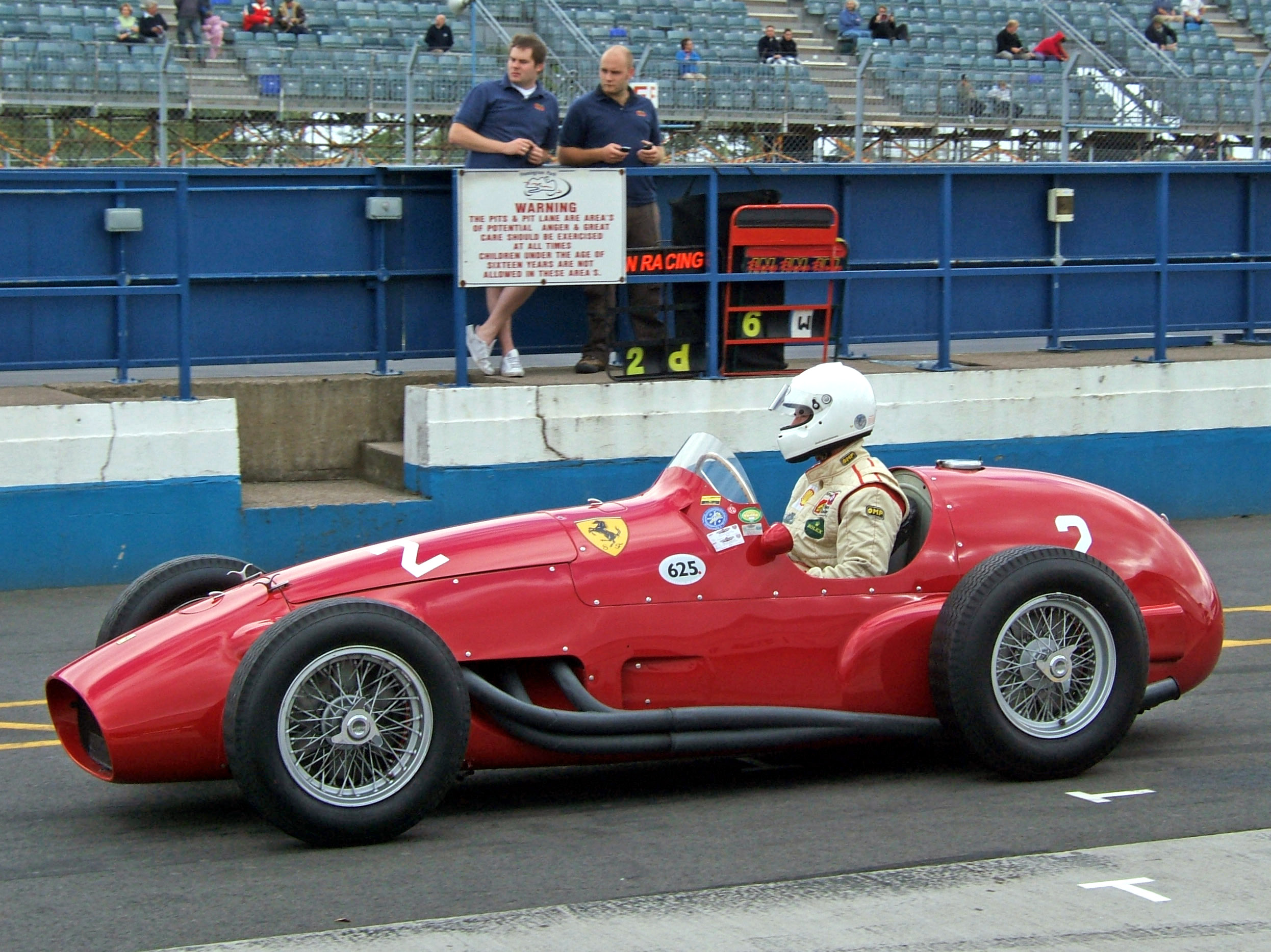
Lex Davison won the race driving a Ferrari 625 similar to the example pictured above.

Results as follows.

Pos	No.	Driver	Car	Entrant	Laps	Time	Points
1	2	(Australia) Lex Davison (Australia) Bill Patterson	Ferrari 625 F1 / Ferrari 3.0L	Ecurie Australie	70	1h 56m 24.7s	6; 2
2	1	(Australia) Stan Jones	Maserati 250F / Maserati 3.0L	Stan Jones	70	1h 57m 7.6s	5
3	3	(Australia) Jack Brabham	Cooper T41 / Climax FWB 1.5L	Jack Brabham	69		3
4	9	(Australia) Len Lukey	Cooper T23 / Bristol 2.0L	Len Lukey	67		2
5	6	(Australia) Alec Mildren	Cooper T20 / Bristol 2.0L	A. G. Mildren	66		1
6	14	(Australia) Syd Taylor	TS Special / GMC	S. Taylor			
7	11	(Australia) Derek Jolly	Decca Special Mk.2 / Climax FWA 1.1L	D. E. Jolly	60		
8	19	(Australia) Merv Dudley	BRM Morgan / Standard 2.1L	Bill Richards Motors			
9	28	(Australia) Barry Ranford	Morgan 4–4 / Morgan 1.2L	B. Ranford			
10	23	(Australia) Neil Aldous	Austin-Healey 100/4 / Austin-Healey 2.7L	Sydney Anderson Automotives			
Ret	25	(Australia) Fred Coxon	Amilcar Special / Holden	F. Coxon			
Ret	18	(Australia) Aub Melrose	Austin-Healey 100/4 / Austin-Healey 2.7L	A. Melrose			
Ret	7	(Australia) Tom Sulman	Aston Martin DB3S / Aston Martin 2.9L	T. Sulman			
Ret	20	(Australia) Peter Bond	Bondley Special / Standard 2.1L	P. Bond			
Ret	15	(Australia) Syd Negus	Plymouth Special / Plymouth 3.8L	S. Negus			
Ret	29	(Australia) George Wakelin	WS Mercury Special / Mercury 4.1L	G. Wakelin			
Ret	17	(Australia) John Walker	MG TC Special / MG 1.4L	J. Walker			
Ret	5	(Australia) Jack Myers	Cooper T20 / Holden 2.4L	J. Myers			
Ret	22	(Australia) David Van Dal (Australia) John Cummins	Bugatti Type 57 / Bugatti 3.3L	D. Van Dal			
Ret	8	(Australia) Tom Hawkes (Australia) Ern Seeliger	Cooper T23 / Holden 2.3L	T. V. Hawkes	25		
Ret	24	(Australia) Eric Kinnear	Austin-Healey 100/4 / Austin-Healey 2.7L	E. Kinnear			
Ret	21	(Australia) Aubury Badger	BM Special / Holden	Badger Motors Holden			
Ret	16	(Australia) Mick Geneve	Ballot Special / Ford 4.1L	M. Geneve			
Ret	12	(Australia) Syd Anderson	Alta GP-2 / Alta S/C 1.5L	Sydney Anderson Automotives	4		
DNS	10	(Australia) Ron Phillips	Austin-Healey 100S / Austin-Healey 2.7L	R. K. Phillips			
DNS	4	(Australia) Bill Patterson	Cooper T39 / Climax FP 1.5L	W. Patterson			
DNS	26	(Australia) Vin Smith	Sevin / Peugeot 1.3L	V. Smith			
DNS	27	(Australia) Tony Carboni	Double V8 / 2xFord 8.2L	Sydney Anderson Automotives			

=== Notes ===
- Attendance: 25,000

Preceded by 1956 Australian Grand Prix	Australian Grand Prix; 1957	Succeeded by 1958 Australian Grand Prix
