= 1961 Australian Drivers' Championship =

Motor racing competition

Seasons
- ← 1960 1962 →

The 1961 Australian Drivers' Championship was a CAMS sanctioned Australian motor racing title for drivers of Formula Libre cars. The title was contested over a five race series with the winner awarded the 1961 CAMS Gold Star. It was the fifth Australian Drivers' Championship.

The series was dominated by Victorian racer Bill Patterson driving a Cooper T51 Climax. Patterson won three of the five races and was second and fourth in the other two. He finished the series 36 points ahead of Lex Davison (Aston Martin DBR4 & Cooper T51 Coventry Climax). Bib Stillwell (Cooper T51 Coventry Climax & Cooper T53 Coventry Climax) placed third in the points standings.

The two races not won by Patterson were Longford, won by British driver Roy Salvadori in a Cooper T51 Coventry Climax and Mallala, won by Davison, also driving a Cooper T51 Coventry Climax .

== Calendar ==
Race	Circuit	Date	Winning driver	Car	Entrant	Report
Bakers Milk International	Longford	6 March	Roy Salvadori	Cooper T51 Coventry Climax	Jack Brabham	
Craven A Gold Star	Mount Panorama, Bathurst	3 April	Bill Patterson	Cooper T51 Coventry Climax	Bill Patterson Motors P/L	
Queensland Road Racing Championship	Lowood	11 June	Bill Patterson	Cooper T51 Coventry Climax	Bill Patterson Motors P/L	
Craven "A" Trophy	Caversham	12 August	Bill Patterson	Cooper T51 Coventry Climax	Bill Patterson Motors P/L	
Australian Grand Prix	Mallala	9 October	Lex Davison	Cooper T51 Coventry Climax	B.S. Stillwell	Report

A sixth championship race was originally scheduled to be held Phillip Island on 10 December. Although a "Racing Car Scratch Race" (The Isle of Wight Trophy) was held at the circuit on that date, a contemporary report in Australian Motor Sports magazine does not label this as a "Gold Star" race and it is omitted from 1961 Gold Star championship summaries at "members.optusnet.com.au/dandsshaw" and "www.oldracingcars.com"

== Points system ==
Championship points were awarded on a 12-7-5-3-2-1 basis for the first six places in each race. Points were awarded only to drivers racing under an Australian licence. Ties were determined by the relevant competitors' placings in the Australian Grand Prix.

== Championship results ==
Pos.	Driver	Car	Entrant	Lon.	Bat.	Low.	Cav.	Mal.	Total
1	Bill Patterson	Cooper T51 Coventry Climax	Bill Patterson Motors Pty. Ltd.	12	12	12	12	3	51
2	Lex Davison	Aston Martin DBR4 & Cooper T51 Coventry Climax	Ecurie Australie & B.S. Stillwell	3	-	-	-	12	15
3	Bib Stillwell	Cooper T51 Coventry Climax & T53 Coventry Climax	B.S. Stillwell	-	5	-	-	7	12
4	Stan Jones	Cooper T51 Coventry Climax	Stan Jones Motors Pty. Ltd. Moran Motors Pty. Ltd.	-	7	5	-	-	12
5	Alec Mildren	Cooper T51 Maserati	A.G. Mildren Pty. Ltd.	2	2	7	-	-	11
6	John Youl	Cooper T51 Coventry Climax	J. Youl	7	-	-	-	-	7
=	Doug Green	Ferrari 500	Reimann Motors	-	-	-	7	-	7
8	David McKay	Cooper T51 Coventry Climax	Scuderia Veloce	-	1	-	-	5	6
9	Austin Miller	Cooper T51 Coventry Climax	A. Miller	5	-	-	-	-	5
=	Jack Ayres	Cooper Mk V Ford	J. Ayres	-	-	-	5	-	5
11	Arnold Glass	Cooper T45 Maserati	Capitol Motors Pty. Ltd.	-	3	1	-	-	4
12	Bruce Coventry	Lotus 18 Ford	A.B. Coventry	-	-	3	-	-	3
=	Lionel Beattie	Repco Holden Sports	L. Beattie	-	-	-	3	-	3
14	Murray Trenberth	Alta F2 Holden	M. Trenberth	-	-	-	-	2	2
15	Noel Barnes	MG TC Special	N.F. Barnes	-	-	2	-	-	2
=	Bob Annear	Pegasus Holden	R. Annear	-	-	-	2	-	2
17	Eddie Clay	Cooper T23 Bristol	E. Clay	-	-	-	-	1	1
18	John Roxburgh	Cooper T45 Coventry Climax	J.B. Roxburgh	1	-	-	-	-	1
=	Jim Ward	Alta GP-2	J Ward	-	-	-	1	-	1

The opening race at Longford was won by Englishman Roy Salvadori who was not eligible for championship points. First place points for that race were therefore awarded to the second placed driver, Bill Patterson.

== Championship name ==
The championship was referred to by the Confederation of Australian Motor Sport in the 1961 CAMS Manual of Motor Sport simply as "The CAMS Gold Star". However historical records published by CAMS use the term "Australian Drivers’ Championship" and that title has been used in this article.
