= 1957 Australian Drivers' Championship =

Motor racing competition

Seasons
- ← none 1958 →

The 1957 Australian Drivers' Championship was a CAMS-sanctioned Australian motor racing title for drivers of Formula Libre cars. The championship was contested over a nine race series with the winner awarded the 1957 CAMS Gold Star. It was the first Australian Drivers' Championship and the first motor racing title to be decided over a series of races at Australian circuits.

The series was won by Victorian racer Lex Davison driving a Ferrari 500/625. Davison dominated the championship, winning six of the nine races, including the series-opening 1957 Australian Grand Prix, to finish 19 points ahead of Tom Hawkes (Cooper T23 Bristol). The other drivers to win races were Murray Trenberth (Vincent 1000), Arnold Glass (HWM Jaguar) and Stan Jones (Maserati 250F).

== Calendar ==
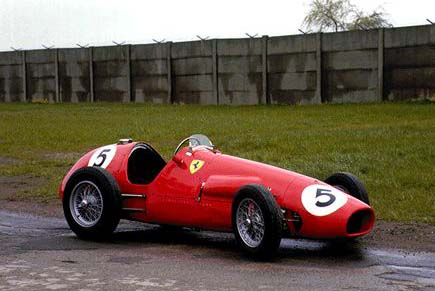
Lex Davison won the championship driving a Ferrari similar to the Tipo 500 shown above

The championship was contested over a nine race series.

Race	Circuit	Date	Winning drivers	Car	Report
Australian Grand Prix	Caversham	4 March	Lex Davison & Bill Patterson	Ferrari 500/625	Report
Victorian Trophy	Albert Park	24 March	Lex Davison	Ferrari 500/625	Report
South Australian Trophy	Port Wakefield	22 April	Murray Trenberth	Vincent 1000	
Bathurst 100	Mount Panorama	22 April	Arnold Glass	HWM Jaguar	
Queensland Road Racing Championship	Lowood	16 June	Lex Davison	Ferrari 500/625	
Lowood Trophy	Lowood	11 August	Stan Jones	Maserati 250F	
New South Wales Road Race Championship	Mount Panorama	6 October	Lex Davison	Ferrari 500/625	
Port Wakefield Trophy	Port Wakefield	12 October	Lex Davison	Ferrari 500/625	
Australian Motor Sports Magazine Trophy Race	Phillip Island	27 October	Lex Davison	Ferrari 500/625	

Shortly after the running of the Victorian Trophy, the Confederation of Australian Motor Sport announced that it had introduced an annual "Gold Star" award for the champion Australian racing driver, with the Australian Grand Prix and the Victorian Trophy being retrospectively included in the list of nominated races counting towards the inaugural championship.

== Points system ==
Championship points were awarded on an 8-5-3-2-1 basis for the first five places at each race.

== Points table ==
Position	Driver	Car	Entrant	Cav	AP	PW	MP	Low	Low	MP	PW	PI	Total
1	Lex Davison	Ferrari 500/625	Ecurie Australie	6	8	-	-	8	-	8	8	8	46
2	Tom Hawkes	Cooper T23-Repco Holden	TV Hawkes	-	2	-	-	5	5	5	5	5	27
3	Stan Jones	Maserati 250F	Stan Jones	5	-	-	-	-	8	-	-	-	13
4	Arnold Glass	HWM-Jaguar	Capitol Motor Cycles	-	-	-	8	2	-	-	-	-	10
5	Derek Jolly	Decca Special Mk 11-Climax	DE Jolly	-	-	5	-	-	1	-	1	2	9
5	Len Lukey	Cooper T23-Bristol	Len Lukey	2	1	-	-	-	-	3	3	-	9
7	Jack Brabham	Cooper T41-Climax	Jack Brabham	3	5	-	-	-	-	-	-	-	8
7	Murray Trenberth	Vincent 1000-Vincent	M Trenberth	-	-	8	-	-	-	-	-	-	8
9	Jack Robinson	JRS-Jaguar	J Robinson	-	-	-	5	-	-	-	-	-	5
10	Bill Patterson	Ferrari 500/625; Cooper T39-Climax	Ecurie Australie; W Patterson	2	-	-	-	-	2	-	-	-	4
10	Alec Mildren	Cooper T20-Bristol; Cooper T41-Climax	AG Mildren	1	-	-	-	-	3	-	-	-	4
12	Bill Pitt	Jaguar D-Type	Mrs G Anderson	-	-	-	-	3	-	-	-	-	3
12	Eddie Perkins	Porsche Special	EB Perkins	-	-	-	-	-	-	-	-	3	3
12	Doug Whiteford	Maserati 300S	D Whiteford	-	3	-	-	-	-	-	-	-	3
12	Bill Pile	MG Special	WM Pile	-	-	3	-	-	-	-	-	-	3
12	Ralph Snodgrass	Talbot-Lago T26C	R Snodgrass	-	-	-	3	-	-	-	-	-	3
17	Keith Rilstone	Zephyr Special-Ford	KW Rilstone	-	-	-	-	-	-	-	2	-	2
17	Ron Phillips	Austin-Healey 100S	RK Phillips	-	-	2	-	-	-	-	-	-	2
17	Ray Wamsley	Alfa Romeo Tipo B-GMC	R Wamsley	-	-	-	-	-	-	2	-	-	2
17	Frank Gardner	Jaguar C-Type	F Gardner	-	-	-	-	1	-	1	-	-	2
17	Jim Johnson	MG TC	J Johnson	-	-	-	2	-	-	-	-	-	2
22	Jack French	Cooper Mk.IV-Norton	JW French	-	-	-	-	-	-	-	-	1	1
22	Tom Stevens	MG Special	TE Stevens	-	-	1	-	-	-	-	-	-	1
22	Gordon Stewart	Stewart-MG	Ecurie Cinque	-	-	-	1	-	-	-	-	-	1

At the Australian Grand Prix race at Caversham Lex Davison shared the winning car with Bill Patterson and championship points were allotted in proportion to the laps driven by each.

== Championship name ==
The championship was referred to by the Confederation of Australian Motor Sport at the time simply as "The CAMS Gold Star". However the actual Gold Star medallion was inscribed with the words "Champion Australian Driver" and historical records published by CAMS use the term "Australian Drivers' Championship".
