= Lex Davison =

Australian racing driver

- Nationality: Australian
- Born: Alexander Nicholas Davison; 12 February 1923 Melbourne, Australia
- Died: 20 February 1965 (aged 42) Sandown Raceway, Melbourne, Australia
- Relatives: Diana Davison (wife); Jon Davison (son); Richard Davison (son); Alex Davison (grandson); Will Davison (grandson); James Davison (grandson)

Australian Drivers' Championship
- Years active: 1957–64
- Teams: Ecurie Australie
- Wins: 11
- Best finish: 1st in 1957 Australian Drivers' Championship

Previous series
- 1964–65: Tasman Series

Championship titles
- 1954 1957 1958 1961 1957 1955 1956 1957: Australian Grand Prix; Australian Grand Prix; Australian Grand Prix; Australian Grand Prix; Australian Drivers' Championship; Australian Hillclimb Championship; Australian Hillclimb Championship; Australian Hillclimb Championship

Alexander Nicholas Davison (12 February 1923 – 20 February 1965) was a racing driver who won the Australian Grand Prix four times between 1954 and 1961 and won the Australian Drivers' Championship in 1957. He drove HWM-Jaguar, Ferrari, Aston Martin and Cooper-Climax grand prix cars.

Davison won Class A of the 1960 Armstrong 500, forerunner of the Bathurst 1000, driving an NSU Prinz.

Davison competed at the 1961 24 Hours of Le Mans with Bib Stillwell in an Aston Martin DB4GT Zagato. Davison and Stillwell were invited to race for the Essex Racing Stable due to their involvement with Aston Martins in the Australian racing scene. Davison had finished second in the 1960 Australian Grand Prix and fourth in the Australian Gold Star Championship in an Aston Martin DBR4/300. Their Le Mans adventure ended prematurely when a blown head gasket saw them retire on lap 25.

Davison won the GT support race at the 1961 British Grand Prix at Aintree driving an Aston Martin DB4 GT Zagato. He finished sixth in the 1961 Guards Trophy driving an Aston Martin DBR4/300 and placed tenth in the Intercontinental Championship.

On 20 February 1965, Davison died in a crash during practice for the 1965 International 100 at Sandown International Raceway. While accelerating through the dog leg of the back straight in his 2.5L Brabham Climax he suffered a heart attack. The car left the road at over 160 km/h, hit a culvert, somersaulted and crashed through a horse railing fence. Davison sustained severe head injuries and was dead when officials reached him.

Davison was the husband of female racing driver Diana Davison and father of Australian racing drivers Jon Davison and Richard Davison and grandfather of Alex Davison, Will Davison and James Davison.

Drivers who win the Australian Grand Prix are awarded the Lex Davison Trophy, so named to honour Davison who was the first four-time winner of the event (the only other 4-time winner is seven-time World Champion Michael Schumacher). This trophy, designed and made in Britain by Mr Rex Hays to the order of CAMS, incorporates a silver model of the Austin 7 driven to victory in the first Australian Grand Prix in 1928.

== Career results ==
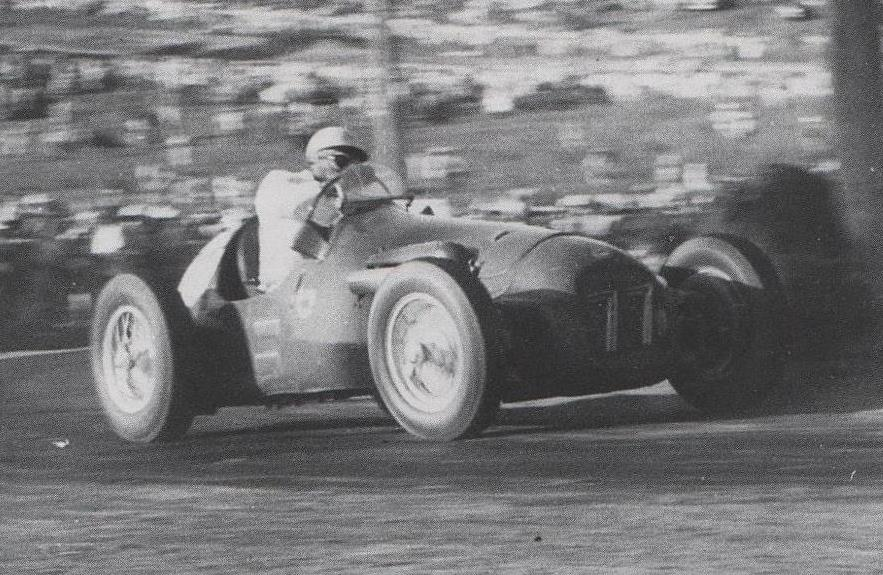
Lex Davison (HWM Jaguar) contesting the 1954 Australian Grand Prix

Season	Series/Title	Position	Car	Team
1955	Australian Hillclimb Championship	1st	Cooper Mk. IV Vincent	
1956	Australian Hillclimb Championship	1st	Cooper Mk. IV Vincent	
1957	Australian Hillclimb Championship	1st	Cooper Mk. IV Irving	
1957	Australian Drivers' Championship	1st	Ferrari 625 F1	
1958	Australian Drivers' Championship	5th	Ferrari 500	
1960	Australian Drivers' Championship	4th	Aston Martin DBR4	
1961	Australian Drivers' Championship	2nd	Aston Martin DBR4 & Cooper T51 Coventry Climax	Ecurie Australie & BS Stillwell
1962	Australian Drivers' Championship	6th	Cooper T53 Climax	
1963	Australian Drivers' Championship	4th	Cooper T62 Climax	
1964	Tasman Series	13th	Cooper T62 Climax	Ecurie Australie
1964	Australian Drivers' Championship	2nd	Cooper T62 Climax; Brabham BT4 Climax	Ecurie Australie

== Notes ==
Sporting positions
Preceded by Doug Whiteford	Winner of the Australian Grand Prix; 1954	Succeeded by Jack Brabham
Preceded by Inaugural	Winner of the Australian Drivers' Championship; 1957	Succeeded by Stan Jones
Preceded by Stirling Moss	Winner of the Australian Grand Prix; 1957 (with Bill Patterson) and 1958	Succeeded by Stan Jones
Preceded by Alec Mildren	Winner of the Australian Grand Prix; 1961	Succeeded by Bruce McLaren
