= Bill Patterson (racing driver) =

- Nationality: Australian
- Born: Gerald William Riggall Patterson; 30 August 1923
- Died: 10 January 2010 (aged 86) Melbourne, Victoria, Australia
- Retired: 1964

Australian Drivers' Championship
- Years active: 1957–63
- Best finish: 1st in 1961 Australian Drivers' Championship

Championship titles
- 1954 1957 1961: Australian Hillclimb Championship; Australian Grand Prix; Australian Drivers' Championship

Gerald William Riggall Patterson (30 August 1923 – 10 January 2010) was an Australian motor racing driver, race team owner and businessman.

Patterson, son of Wimbledon champion Gerald Patterson, attended his father's school, Scotch College, Melbourne, from 1931 to 1934, and Geelong Grammar School from 1935 to 1941. He was one of a brace of new drivers that emerged after World War II, first appearing in the Australian Grand Prix in 1948 driving a stripped down MG TC. After improving the MG as far as he was able, he moved to a JAP powered Cooper Mk.V in 1953. Patterson used this to win his first national title, the 1954 Australian Hillclimb Championship.

In the scorching heat of a Western Australian summer in 1957, Patterson stepped into Lex Davison's Ferrari 625 F1 as a relief driver, working together to defeat Stan Jones to win the 1957 Australian Grand Prix.

A succession of grand prix Coopers followed. The biggest year of Patterson's career was 1961. Victories at Mount Panorama, Lowood, Caversham and a second at Longford saw Patterson dominate the 1961 Australian Drivers' Championship, scoring 51 points to Lex Davison's 15 to win the Gold Star.

Patterson raced on for a few more years and took part in the inaugural Tasman Series in 1964, but after that Patterson stepped away from the sport as a driver, but stayed as an entrant, sponsor and team boss. Patterson Holden dealership Bill Patterson Motors supported several drivers over the following decades, open wheelers for the rest of the 1960s and on into the 1970s. In 1977, Patterson purchased touring car racing team, Team Brock which he ran for a year. Patterson's name continued to be seen in the sport into the 2000s in Speedway racing.

Patterson died at Sandringham on 10 January 2010 at the age of 86.

== Career results ==
| Season | Race / Series | Position | Car | Team |
|---|---|---|---|---|
| 1956 | Moomba TT | 7th | MGA | Bill Patterson |
| 1957 | Australian Drivers' Championship | 4th | Ferrari 625 F1; Cooper T39 Climax | Ecurie Australie; W.Patterson |
| 1957 | Victorian Tourist Trophy | 3rd | Cooper Coventry Climax | Bill Patterson Motors P/L |
| 1959 | Australian Drivers' Championship | 4th | Cooper T43 Climax | Bill Patterson Motors P/L |
| 1960 | Australian Drivers' Championship | 3rd | Cooper T51 Climax | Bill Patterson Motors P/L |
| 1961 | Australian Drivers' Championship | 1st | Cooper T51 Climax | Bill Patterson Motors P/L |
| 1962 | Australian Drivers' Championship | 3rd | Cooper T51 Climax | Bill Patterson Motors P/L |
| 1963 | Australian Drivers' Championship | 6th | Cooper T51 Climax; Cooper T53 Climax | Bill Patterson Motors P/L |

Sporting positions
| Preceded by Stirling Moss | Winner of the Australian Grand Prix; 1957 with Lex Davison | Succeeded by Lex Davison |
| Preceded by Alec Mildren | Winner of the Australian Drivers' Championship; 1961 | Succeeded by Bib Stillwell |
