= Syd Negus =

Australian politician

Senator for Western Australia
- In office 1 July 1971 – 18 May 1974

Personal details
- Born: 12 March 1912 Leederville, Western Australia
- Died: 1 August 1986 (aged 74)
- Party: Independent
- Other political affiliations: Progressive Conservative (1980)
- Occupation: carpenter, contractor

Sydney Ambrose Negus (12 March 1912 – 1 August 1986) was an Australian politician who was an independent senator for Western Australia from 1971 until 1974. He was previously a carpenter and building contractor.

Negus was elected largely on an anti-inheritance tax platform, following the death of his brother, Oscar Negus a judge of the Supreme Court of Western Australia, which led to Syd Negus' realisation of the impost of the tax on widows. His campaign established a groundswell of public support and Queensland was the first state to abolish inheritance taxes in 1977; the Commonwealth of Australia and other states followed soon after by abolishing their respective inheritance and gift taxes.

Negus was defeated in the 1974 election. He later contested the 1975 Bass by-election as an independent and, at the 1980 federal election, was a candidate for the far-right, anti-immigration Progressive Conservative Party.

Negus was president of the West Australian Sporting Car Club and competed in the Australian Grand Prix on several occasions.
