= Cooper T51 =

Formula One racing car

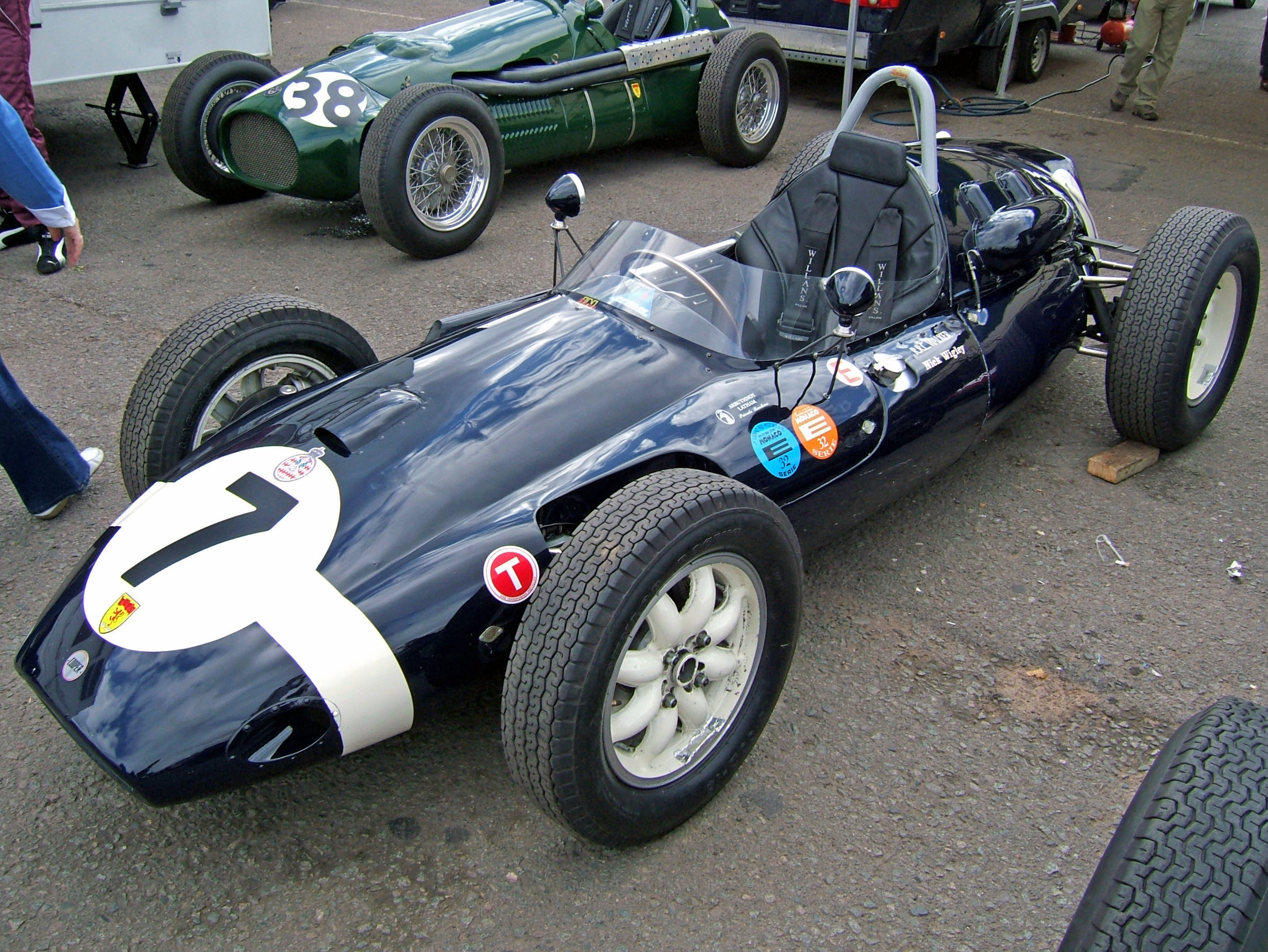
- Category: Formula One, Formula Two
- Constructor: Cooper Car Company
- Designer: Owen Maddock
- Predecessor: Cooper T45
- Successor: Cooper T53

Technical specifications
- Chassis: Steel spaceframe
- Suspension (front): Double wishbone, coil spring and damper
- Suspension (rear): Double wishbone, leaf spring and damper
- Axle track: F: 55 in (1,397 mm); R: 53 in (1,346 mm)
- Wheelbase: 104 in (2,642 mm)
- Engine: Climax, Maserati, Castellotti, Borgward or Ferrari 2.5- or 1.5-litre straight-4, naturally aspirated, rear mid, longitudinally mounted.
- Transmission: Citroen, Colotti (and others) manual gearbox.
- Weight: 1,545 lb (701 kg)
- Tyres: Dunlop

Competition history
- Notable entrants: Cooper, Rob Walker Racing Team, Scuderia Centro Sud, Yeoman Credit Racing Team
- Notable drivers: (United Kingdom) Stirling Moss (Australia) Jack Brabham (New Zealand) Bruce McLaren (United States) Phil Hill (Germany) Wolfgang Von Trips (United Kingdom) Tony Brooks (France) Maurice Trintignant (United States) Masten Gregory (Belgium) Olivier Gendebien (United Kingdom) Roy Salvadori
- Debut: 1959 Monaco Grand Prix
Races	Wins	Poles	F/Laps
24	5	6	6
- Constructors' Championships: 1 (1959)
- Drivers' Championships: 1 (Jack Brabham, 1959)

The Cooper T51 was a Formula One and Formula Two racing car designed by Owen Maddock and built by the Cooper Car Company for the 1959 Formula One season. The T51 earned a significant place in motor racing history when Jack Brabham drove the car to become the first driver to win the World Championship of Drivers with an engine mounted behind them, in 1959. The T51 was raced in several configurations by various entrants until 1963 and in all no less than 38 drivers were entered to drive T51s in Grand Prix races.

== The chassis ==
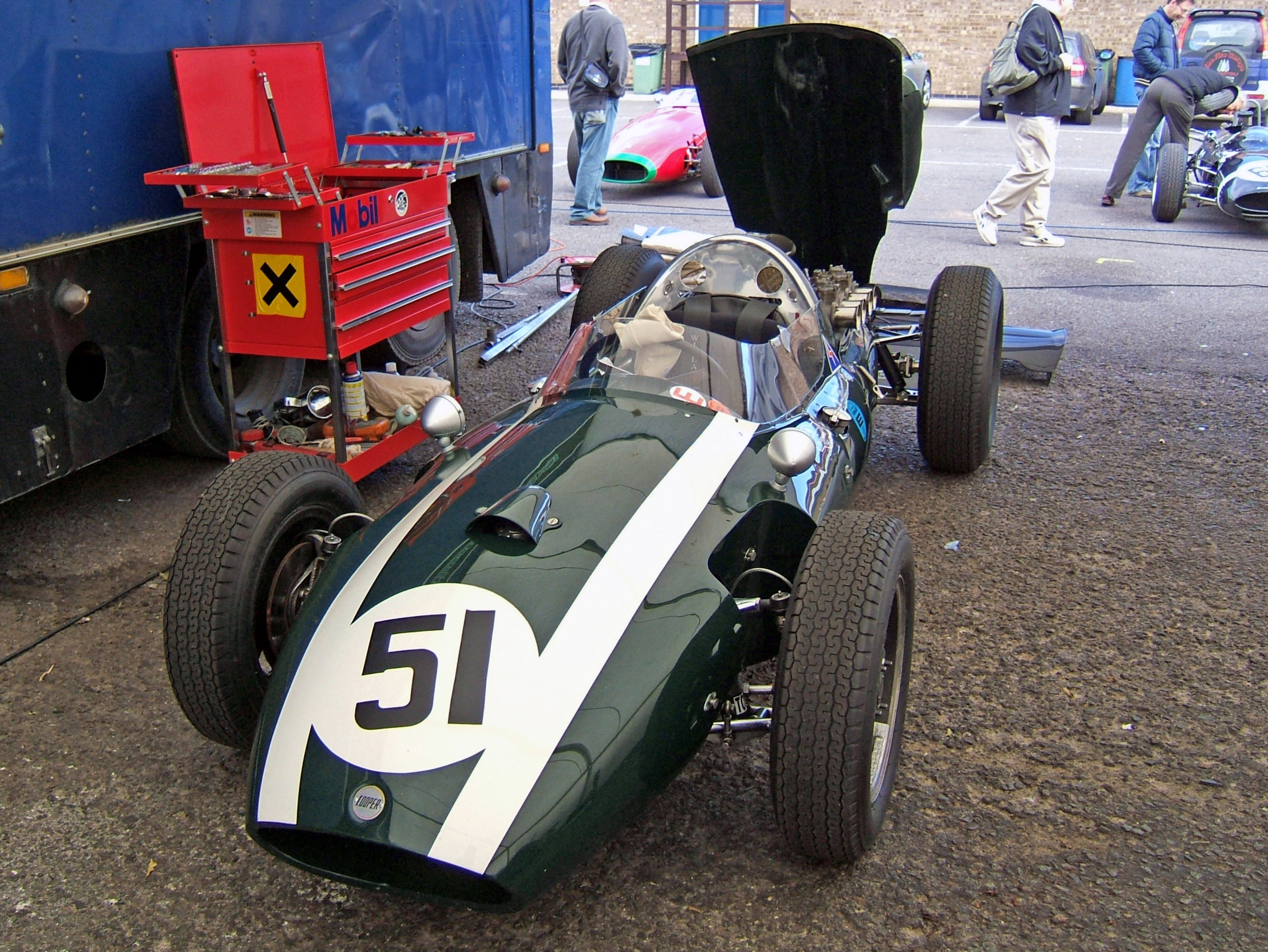
A works Cooper T51

Aesthetically and aerodynamically, the T51 was a natural development of the T43 and T45 that had given Cooper their first two wins. The Coopers continued their practice of building spaceframe chassis that ignored orthodox design thinking in having several curved links and the mid-engine layout meant weight savings and aerodynamic advantages over front-engined cars, which typically had separate gearbox and differential cases, and had to find room for propshafts to the rear wheels. Also the location of the fuel tanks on either side of the cockpit rather than at the rear meant the car handled more consistently with different fuel loads, a vital factor during races which lasted up to three hours. One notable throwback, however, was the car's transverse leaf spring rear suspension, although it used a more modern coil spring and wishbone setup at the front.

=== Engine and transmission ===
The standard F1 T51 was the first Cooper powered by the 2.5-litre 4-cylinder engine which Cooper and Lotus had commissioned Coventry Climax to build specifically for their rear-engined machines. The pioneering nature of this configuration created problems of its own, since there were so few rear-engined production cars from which a gearbox could be sourced. This shortage eventually created a niche in the market which paved the way for Hewland's prominence, but in the meantime many different solutions were tried, with varying degrees of success. The works Coopers were fitted with modified Citroen gearboxes, while Rob Walker's team ran bespoke units from Italian specialist Valerio Colotti, although these proved much more fragile.

In all, eight different engines were used in the back of T51s in championship races, with 2.2- and 1.5-litre Climax engines in addition to the standard 2.5: Scuderia Centro Sud and others used 2.5 and 1.5-litre engines from Maserati; the British Racing Partnership team used F2 powerplants from Borgward; Scuderia Castellotti used their own Ferrari-derived 2.5-litre units; and one car used a Ferrari 2-litre engine lifted from a 625LM.

== A historic season ==
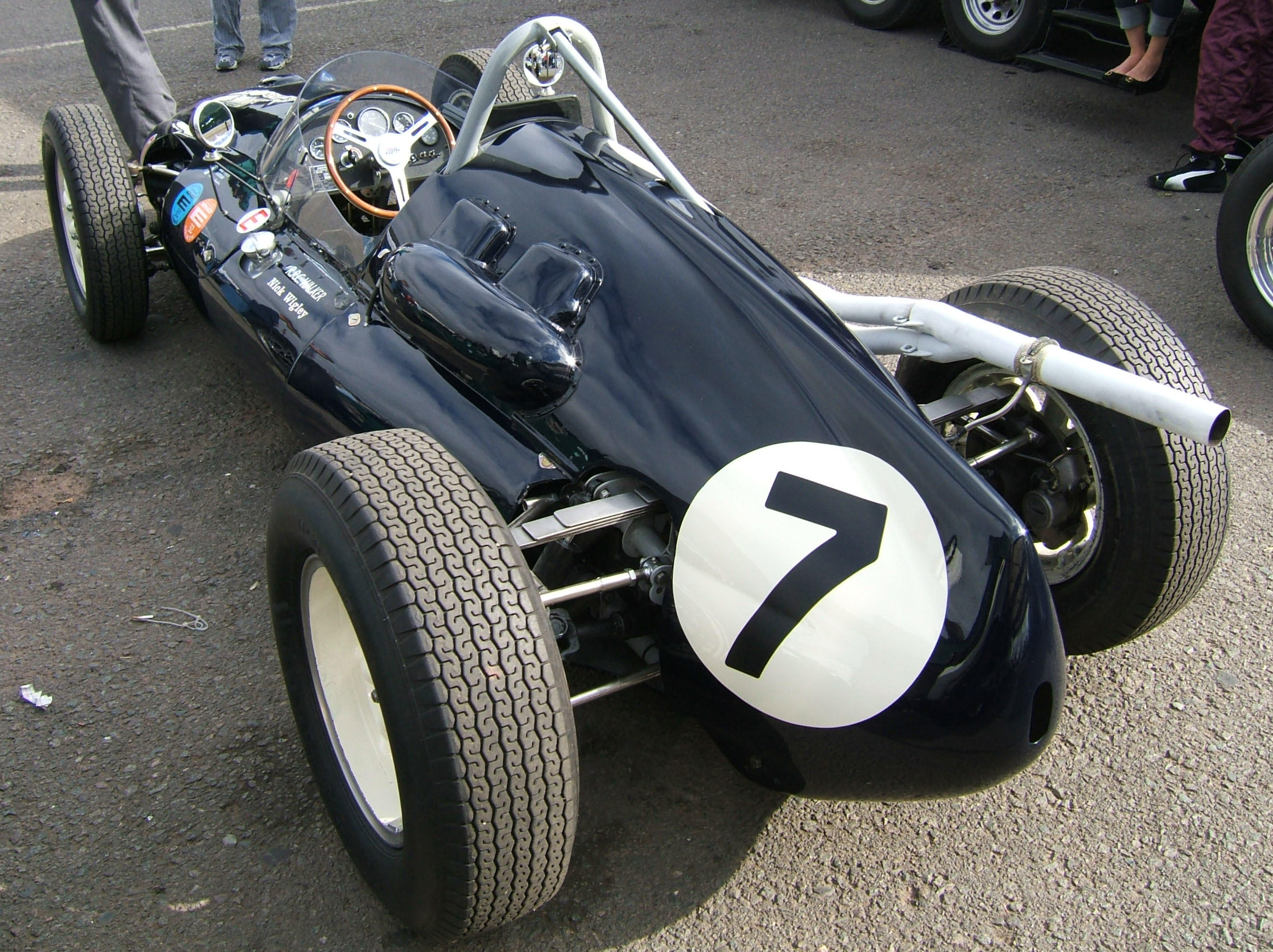
A T51 in the Rob Walker Racing Team's colours, as driven by Stirling Moss. (The roll hoop has been retro-fitted.)

The T51 had already won the Glover Trophy at Goodwood and the Silverstone International Trophy before it made its first World Championship appearance in the 1959 Monaco Grand Prix, with no less than eight examples entered. The Cooper works team fielded Jack Brabham, Bruce McLaren and Masten Gregory, Stirling Moss and Maurice Trintignant were entered by Rob Walker, two 1.5-litre F2 cars were entered by Equipe Nationale Belge for Lucien Bianchi and Alain de Changy, with Ivor Bueb driving another F2 machine. Only the five 2.5-litre cars qualified, with Stirling Moss in pole position (Cooper's first) and Brabham starting in third place. Jean Behra took the lead at the start, but after his Ferrari developed engine problems after 21 laps the Coopers dominated, with Moss and Brabham running first and second until Moss's transmission gave up the ghost 19 laps from the end. Brabham cruised to his first World Championship win with Trintignant third and McLaren fifth. From Monaco on Cooper's season went from strength to strength, with Brabham leading the championship from start to finish. Brabham took his second win in the British Grand Prix, before Moss took a brace in Portugal and Italy and dominated the non-championship Gold Cup.
By the final race at Sebring Cooper already had the Constructors' Championship in the bag, but the Drivers Championship was still up for grabs. Moss needed to beat Brabham and finish second or better to take the title, while Ferrari's Tony Brooks had a mathematical chance but needed both the win and fastest lap. Moss sprinted into the lead from pole position with Brabham in pursuit. After five laps Moss was a commanding ten seconds ahead, before his gearbox gave way again. Brabham led right up to the final lap, when a poor decision on Brabham's part meant he ran out of fuel. He managed to push his car across the line in fourth, but Cooper still won the race as Bruce McLaren became the youngest winner in Formula One history (a record he held until surpassed by Fernando Alonso in 2003), leaving Brabham the Drivers' Champion.

== Into obscurity ==
1960 Cooper-Climax T53

Cooper travelled down to the 1960 Argentine Grand Prix seemingly at the peak of their powers, and Trintignant won the Buenos Aires F1 event that preceded the main championship race. However this turned out to be the last major win for a T51, as the speed of the new Lotus 18 began to dominate. On the journey back, John Cooper made his mind up that to stay at the front he needed to build a new car, and at the next championship race at Monaco the lowline T53 made its debut. In the meantime Moss took the Walker T51 to second in the Glover Trophy and qualified on pole position for the International Trophy before retiring with wishbone failure. Rob Walker had already bought a Lotus 18 for Moss, but the Englishman was to miss a large part of the season through injuries sustained when his notoriously fragile Lotus lost a wheel at speed in Belgium. Cooper entered the T51 just three more times, with ex-Scarab driver Chuck Daigh and journeyman Ron Flockhart retiring each time.

== T51 World Championship Formula One results (Cooper and Walker entries only) ==
(key) (Results in bold indicate pole position, in italic indicate fastest lap)

1959	Entrant	Engine	Drivers	MON	500	NED	FRA	GBR	GER	POR	ITA	USA		Points	WCC
1959	Cooper Car Company	Climax 2.5l S4	Jack Brabham	1		2	3	**1**	Ret	Ret	3	4		40	1st
1959	Cooper Car Company	Climax 2.5l S4	Masten Gregory	Ret		3	Ret	7	Ret	2				40	1st
1959	Cooper Car Company	Climax 2.5l S4	Bruce McLaren	5			5	3	Ret	Ret	Ret	1		40	1st
1959	Cooper Car Company	Climax 2.5l S4	Giorgio Scarlatti								12			40	1st
1959	RRC Walker Racing Team	Climax 2.5l S4	Stirling Moss	**Ret**		Ret			Ret	**1**	**1**	**Ret**		40	1st
1959	RRC Walker Racing Team	Climax 2.5l S4	Maurice Trintignant	3		8	11	5	4	4	9	2		40	1st
1960	Entrant	Engine	Drivers	ARG	MON	500	NED	BEL	FRA	GBR	POR	ITA	USA	Points	WCC
1960	Cooper Car Company	Climax 2.5l S4	Jack Brabham	Ret										0	NC
1960	Cooper Car Company	Climax 2.5l S4	Chuck Daigh							Ret				0	NC
1960	Cooper Car Company	Climax 2.5l S4	Ron Flockhart										Ret	0	NC
1960	RRC Walker Racing Team	Climax 2.5l S4	Stirling Moss	3s										0	NC
1960	RRC Walker Racing Team	Climax 2.5l S4	Maurice Trintignant	3s										0	NC

== T51 Non-championship Formula One results (Cooper and Walker entries only) ==
(key) (Results in bold indicate pole position, italic indicate fastest lap)

1959	Entrant	Engine	Drivers	GLV	AIN	INT	IGC	SCT		
1959	Cooper Car Company	Climax 2.5l S4	Jack Brabham	2	Ret	1	2	2		
1959	Cooper Car Company	Climax 2.5l S4	Masten Gregory	5	**Ret**					
1959	Cooper Car Company	Climax 2.5l S4	Bruce McLaren				Ret			
1959	RRC Walker Racing Team	Climax 2.5l S4	Stirling Moss	1			**1**			
1959	RRC Walker Racing Team	Climax 2.5l S4	Maurice Trintignant		Ret					
1960	Entrant	Engine	Drivers	RSA	CBA	GLV	INT	SCT	LOM	IGC
1960	Cooper Car Company	Climax 2.5l S4	Jack Brabham		Ret					
1960	Cooper Car Company	Climax 2.5l S4	Ron Flockhart							Ret
1960	RRC Walker Racing Team	Climax 2.5l S4	Stirling Moss	2		2	**19**			
1960	RRC Walker Racing Team	Climax 2.5l S4	Maurice Trintignant		1					

== Privateer entries ==
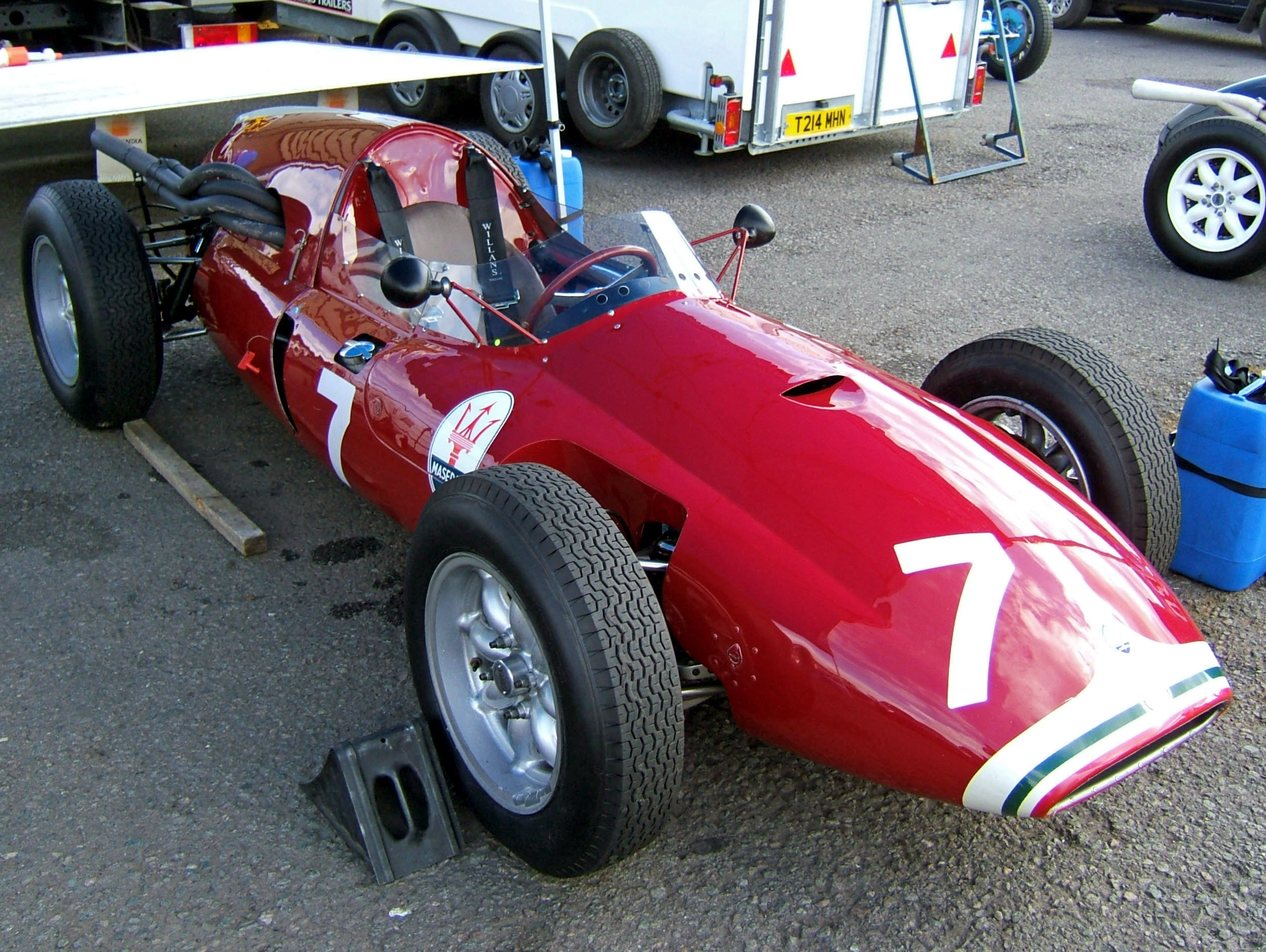
A Scuderia Centro Sud T51-Maserati

As well as being a racing team, Cooper was very much a business, as shown by the 1958 International Trophy where 19 Coopers of various types made up more than half the grid. Right from the outset the T51 was designed to be produced in large numbers and offered for sale to privateer teams, with Rob Walker getting full-works cars and the rest receiving slightly more workmanlike models. No fewer than ten other entrants ran T51s in Formula 1 during 1959, and with the works team switching to the T53, and Walker using Lotus 18s, many of the ex-works cars were sold and continued to be entered in 1960. Indeed, the T51 continued to appear on minor, non-championship F1 race entry lists as late as the 1967 Rhodesian Grand Prix.

=== Scuderia Centro Sud ===
Guglielmo Dei set up Scuderia Centro Sud to publicise his business as distributor of Maserati cars to central and southern Italy, hence the name he chose for his team. Having fielded Maserati 250Fs for several years he switched to T51s midway through 1960, with the Climax replaced with a two-year-old 2.5-litre Maserati straight-4 250s engine which was used in Maserati's unspectacular 250S sportscar. In this configuration Centro Sud entered the T51 in 14 World Championship races, more than any other entrant. After converting to the 1.5-litre formula post-1960, Centro Sud's Cooper Maseratis still made the occasional appearance in minor Italian F1 races as late as 1963. Dei never kept his drivers for long, as they tended to be either journeymen, faded former stars like Maurice Trintignant, or up-and-coming racers like Wolfgang Von Trips who would soon be snapped up by bigger teams. In all, more than a dozen drivers drove T51s for Centro Sud.

Scuderia Centro Sud Championship results (key)

	Entrant	Engine	Drivers	MON	500	NED	FRA	GBR	GER	POR	ITA	USA		Points	WCC
1959	Scuderia Centro Sud	Maserati 2.5l S4	Ian Burgess				Ret	Ret	6		14			0	-
1959	Scuderia Centro Sud	Maserati 2.5l S4	Colin Davis				Ret				11			0	-
1959	Scuderia Centro Sud	Maserati 2.5l S4	Hans Herrmann					Ret						0	-
1959	Scuderia Centro Sud	Maserati 2.5l S4	Nicha Cabral							10				0	-
	Entrant	Engine	Drivers	ARG	MON	500	NED	BEL	FRA	GBR	POR	ITA	USA	Points	WCC
1960	Scuderia Centro Sud	Maserati 2.5l S4	Masten Gregory		DNQ		DNS		9	14	Ret			3	**5th**
1960	Scuderia Centro Sud	Maserati 2.5l S4	Ian Burgess		DNQ				10	Ret			Ret	3	**5th**
1960	Scuderia Centro Sud	Maserati 2.5l S4	Maurice Trintignant		Ret		Ret		Ret				15	3	**5th**
1960	Scuderia Centro Sud	Maserati 2.5l S4	Carlos Menditeguy	4										3	**5th**
1960	Scuderia Centro Sud	Maserati 2.5l S4	Roberto Bonomi	11										3	**5th**
1960	Scuderia Centro Sud	Maserati 2.5l S4	Nicha Cabral								Ret			3	**5th**
1960	Scuderia Centro Sud	Maserati 2.5l S4	Giorgio Scarlatti									Ret		3	**5th**
1960	Scuderia Centro Sud	Maserati 2.5l S4	Alfonso Thiele									Ret		3	**5th**
1960	Scuderia Centro Sud	Maserati 2.5l S4	Wolfgang Von Trips										9	3	**5th**
	Entrant	Engine	Drivers	MON	NED	BEL	FRA	GBR	GER	ITA	USA			Points	WCC
1961	Scuderia Centro Sud	Maserati 1.5l S4	Massimo Natili					Ret						0	-

=== British Racing Partnership/Yeoman Credit Racing Team ===
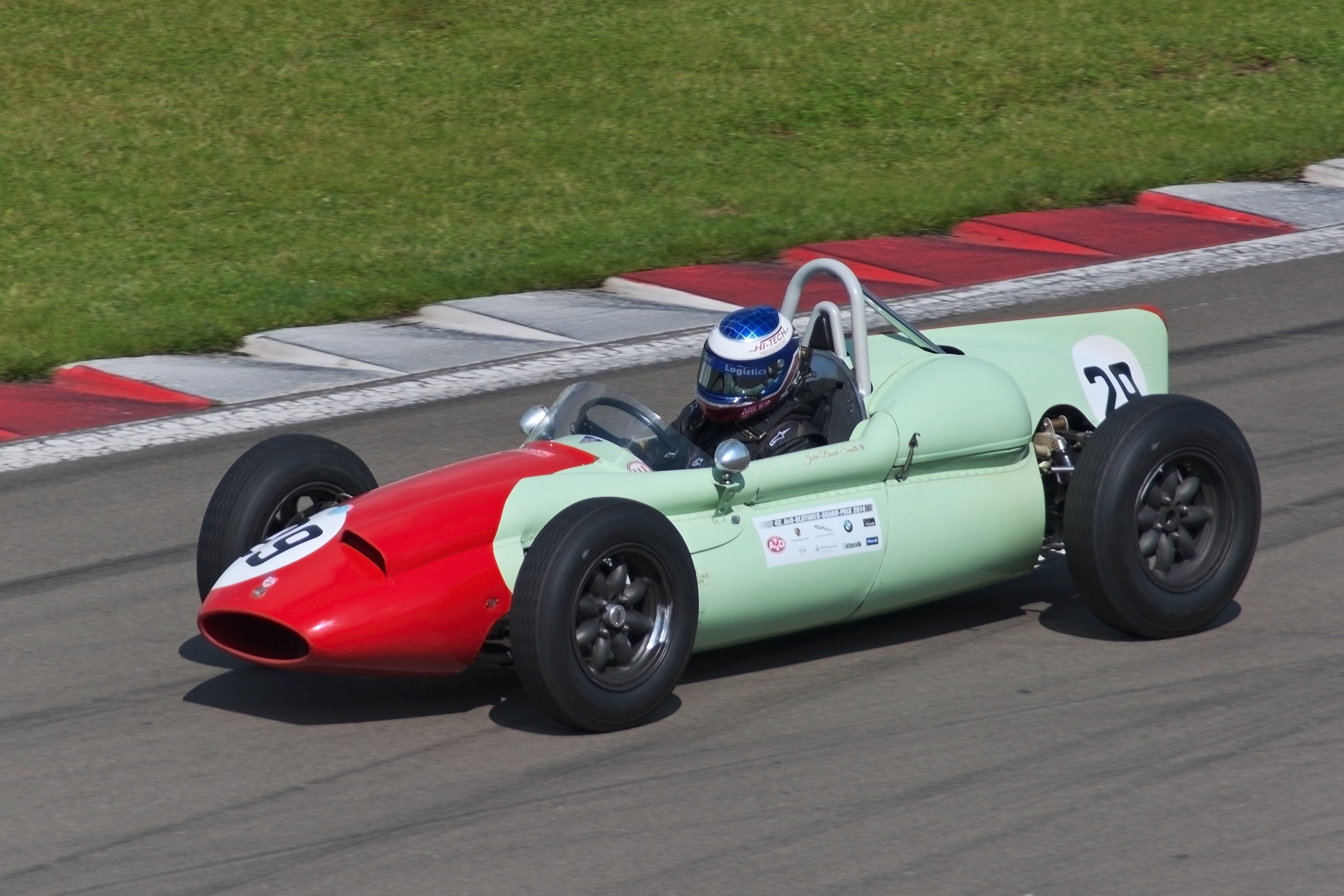
1960 Yeoman Credit Racing T51

The British Racing Partnership team was founded by Ken Gregory and Alfred Moss, Stirling's father, in late 1957. They spent 1958 and 1959 competing in Formula Two events, with the odd entry into F1 races, particularly in the UK, and experimented with 1.5-litre Borgward engines for their 1959-spec T51s, under an arrangement whereby Stirling Moss would use the Borgward-engined BRP cars with Rob Walker as the entrant.
For 1960 they had agreed for the three Samengo-Turner brothers, motor racing enthusiasts who owned Yeoman Credit Ltd., to bankroll their season with 2.5-litre Climax-engined F1 entries as well as a full slate of F2 entries with Borgward. BRP's list of drivers for 1960 was quite impressive, including at various points future champions Phil Hill and Denis Hulme, respected names like Tony Brooks and Dan Gurney, as well as Ferrari sportscar ace Olivier Gendebien. The Yeoman Credit cars were distinctive in having a mint green and red colour scheme and an air intake that stretched from the top of the car above the front axle along the left side of the cockpit to the engine's intake trumpets behind.

By the end of 1960 BRP had lost three drivers - Ivor Bueb, Harry Schell (who also ran his own T51 under the Ecurie Bleue banner) and Chris Bristow - to fatal accidents, and the Samengo-Turners decided to take their money to Reg Parnell's team instead, and since Parnell had filled up Cooper's order book BRP had to switch to Lotus for 1961.

British Racing Partnership Championship results (key)

	Entrant	Engine	Drivers	MON	500	NED	FRA	GBR	GER	POR	ITA	USA		Points	WCC
1959	British Racing Partnership	Climax 1.5l S4 / Borgward 1.5l S4	Ivor Bueb	DNQ				13						0	-
1959	British Racing Partnership	Climax 1.5l S4 / Borgward 1.5l S4	Chris Bristow					10						0	-
	Entrant	Engine	Drivers	ARG	MON	500	NED	BEL	FRA	GBR	POR	ITA	USA	Points	WCC
1960	Yeoman Credit Racing Team	Climax 2.5l S4	Tony Brooks		4		Ret	Ret		5	5		Ret	0†	-†
1960	Yeoman Credit Racing Team	Climax 2.5l S4	Chris Bristow		Ret		Ret	Ret						0†	-†
1960	Yeoman Credit Racing Team	Climax 2.5l S4	Henry Taylor				7		4	8	DNS		14	0†	-†
1960	Yeoman Credit Racing Team	Climax 2.5l S4	Olivier Gendebien					3	2	9	7		Ret	0†	-†
1960	Yeoman Credit Racing Team	Climax 2.5l S4	Bruce Halford						8					0†	-†
1960	Yeoman Credit Racing Team	Climax 2.5l S4	Phil Hill										6	0†	-†

†In 1960 only the best-performing car for each chassis-engine combination scored Constructors' points in each race, and on every occasion this was a works Cooper-Climax.

=== Scuderia Castellotti ===
Named after the Ferrari driver who died in testing at the Modena circuit in 1957, Scuderia Castellotti was founded by Giuseppe Corsi in Lodi in 1958. It used modified Ferrari Tipo 553 2.0-litre engines bored out to 2.5 litres and rebranded as "Castellotti", with "Eugenio" on the cam covers. The cars were easily distinguishable from other F1 T51s in that their exhausts were fitted on the left, while all other engines used in T51s had their exhausts on the right. The team competed in four events in 1960 with lesser-known Italian drivers Gino Munaron, Giorgio Scarlatti and Giulio Cabianca.
Cabianca scored the team's first championship points by finishing fourth at the 1960 Italian Grand Prix. Cabianca was at the wheel of a T51-Castellotti in Modena in 1961 when he fell victim to one of Formula One's most bizarre accidents while testing. With his throttle stuck open he was unable to stop, went out of the circuit onto public roads and collided with four bystanders before crashing into the wall of the coachbuilder Orlandi. In the aftermath, the inadequacy of the Modena circuit's structures were lambasted in a court case, effectively preventing the track from running any further events.

Scuderia Castellotti Championship results (key)

	Entrant	Engine	Drivers	ARG	MON	500	NED	BEL	FRA	GBR	POR	ITA	USA	Points	WCC
1960	Scuderia Castellotti	Castellotti 2.5l S4	Giorgio Scarlatti		DNQ									**3**	**5th**
1960	Scuderia Castellotti	Castellotti 2.5l S4	Gino Munaron						Ret	15		Ret		**3**	**5th**
1960	Scuderia Castellotti	Castellotti 2.5l S4	Giulio Cabianca									4		**3**	**5th**

=== Other privateers ===
The T51 was entered into championship races by a further twelve organisations, the most notable being Reg Parnell, who later took over Yeoman Credit's racing activities from BRP, and Fred Armbruster, who entered Pete Lovely in the 1960 United States Grand Prix with a T51 uniquely fitted with a Ferrari Tipo 555 engine, a different engine to those used by Scuderia Eugenio Castelotti. The final World Championship appearance for a T51 came when Trevor Blokdyk took his Scuderia Lupini T51-Maserati to twelfth place in the 1963 South African Grand Prix.

Privateer Championship results (key)

	Entrant	Engine	Drivers	MON	500	NED	FRA	GBR	GER	POR	ITA	USA		Points	WCC
1959	Equipe Nationale Belge	Climax 1.5l S4	Lucien Bianchi	DNQ										**40***	**1st**
1959	Equipe Nationale Belge	Climax 1.5l S4	Alain de Changy	DNQ										**40***	**1st**
1959	Ace Garage – Rotherham	Climax 1.5l S4	Trevor Taylor					DNQ						**40***	**1st**
1959	United Racing Stable	Climax 1.5l S4	Bill Moss					DNQ						**40***	**1st**
1959	RHH Parnell	Climax 1.5l S4	Henry Taylor					11						**40***	**1st**
1959	Ecurie Bleue	Climax 2.5l S4	Harry Schell									Ret		**40***	**1st**
	Entrant	Engine	Drivers	ARG	MON	500	NED	BEL	FRA	GBR	POR	ITA	USA	Points	WCC
1960	Ecurie Bleue	Climax 2.5l S4	Harry Schell	Ret										**48 (56)***	**1st**
1960	Fred Tuck Cars	Climax 2.5l S4	Bruce Halford		DNQ									**48 (56)***	**1st**
1960	Fred Tuck Cars	Climax 2.5l S4	Lucien Bianchi						Ret	Ret				**48 (56)***	**1st**
1960	High Efficiency Motors/C.T. Atkins	Climax 2.5l S4	Roy Salvadori		Ret								8	**48 (56)***	**1st**
1960	High Efficiency Motors/C.T. Atkins	Climax 2.5l S4	Jack Fairman							Ret				**48 (56)***	**1st**
1960	Ecurie Maarsbergen	Climax 1.5l S4	Carel Godin de Beaufort				8							**48 (56)***	**1st**
1960	Fred Armbruster	Ferrari 2.5l S4	Pete Lovely										11	**0**	-
	Entrant	Engine	Drivers	MON	NED	BEL	FRA	GBR	GER	ITA	USA			Points	WCC
1961	Scuderia Serenissima	Maserati 1.5l S4	Maurice Trintignant	7		Ret	13		Ret	9				**0**	-
	Entrant	Engine	Drivers	MON	BEL	NED	FRA	GBR	GER	ITA	USA	MEX	RSA	Points	WCC
1963	Frank Dochnal	Climax 1.5l S4	Frank Dochnal									DNQ		**25 (26)***	**5th**
1963	Scuderia Lupini	Maserati 1.5l S4	Trevor Blokdyk										12	**0**	-

* All points were scored by other entrants
