= Grands Prix during World War II =

Grands Prix between 1940 and 1945

Grand Prix motor racing in Europe was affected by the outbreak of World War II in late 1939, leaving the 1939 Grand Prix season without an official champion. Italy remained neutral until June 1940 and staged two GPs in May 1940, as well as the 1940 Mille Miglia sports car race.

The USA held several races until September 1941. After that only a few events in South America took place, the latest in July 1942. There was no organised championship in these years. The majority of Grand Prix races during this period were run in the Americas.

The first post-war races were run in Paris on 9 September 1945, one week after the end of the war in the Pacific. They were not regular international Grand Prix, but mainly French, commemorating war-related events or persons, like the 1945 Coupe des Prisonniers.

== Wartime Grands Prix ==
=== 1940–1942 ===
| Date | Name | Circuit | Winning drivers | Winning constructor | Report |
|---|---|---|---|---|---|
| 1 January 1940 | (Australia) South Australian Hundred | Lobethal | (Australia) Jack Phillips | Ford V8 | Report |
| 12 May 1940 | (Brazil) São Paulo Grand Prix | Interlagos | (Brazil) Arthur Nascimento Jr | Alfa Romeo | Report |
| 12 May 1940 | (Libya) Tripoli Grand Prix | Mellaha | (Italy) Giuseppe Farina | Alfa Romeo | Report |
| 23 May 1940 | (Italy) Targa Florio | Favorita Park | (Italy) Luigi Villoresi | Maserati | Report |
| 30 May 1940 | (United States) Indianapolis 500 | Indianapolis | (United States) Wilbur Shaw | Maserati | Report |
| 24 August 1940 | (United States) Springfield 100 | Illinois | (United States) Rex Mays | Winfield | Report |
| 2 September 1940 | (United States) Syracuse 100 | New York | (United States) Rex Mays | Winfield | Report |
| 30 May 1941 | (United States) Indianapolis 500 | Indianapolis | (United States) Floyd Davis (United States) Mauri Rose | Wetteroth | Report |
| 24 August 1941 | (United States) Milwaukee 100 | Milwaukee | (United States) Rex Mays | Winfield | Report |
| 2 September 1941 | (United States) Syracuse 100 | New York | (United States) Rex Mays | Winfield | Report |
| 28 September 1941 | (Brazil) Rio de Janeiro Grand Prix | Gávea | (Brazil) Chico Landi | Alfa Romeo | Report |
| 23 November 1941 | (Argentina) Buenos Aires Grand Prix | Costanera | (Argentina) José Canziani | Alfa Romeo | Report |
| January 1942 | (Argentina) Buenos Aires Grand Prix | Costanera | (Argentina) José Canziani | Alfa Romeo | Report |
| 5 April 1942 | (Argentina) Grand Prix Vendimia | Mendoza Province | (Argentina) Adriano Malusardi | Alfa Romeo | Report |
| 3 May 1942 | (Argentina) Santa Fe Grand Prix | Santa Fe | (Brazil) Oldemar Ramos | Alfa Romeo | Report |
| 18 July 1942 | (Uruguay) Autódromo Nacional | Barra De Santa Lucia | (Argentina) Juan Carlos Passato | Alfa Romeo | Report |

=== 1943–1944 ===
No Grand Prix races held

=== 1945 ===
| Date | Name | Circuit | Winning drivers | Winning constructor | Report |
|---|---|---|---|---|---|
| 9 September 1945 | (France) Coupe Robert Benoist | Bois de Boulogne | (France) Aldo Gordini | Simca | Report |
| 9 September 1945 | (France) Coupe de la Liberation | Bois de Boulogne | (France) Henri Louveau | Maserati | Report |
| 9 September 1945 | (France) Coupe des Prisonniers | Bois de Boulogne | (France) Jean-Pierre Wimille | Bugatti | Report |
