= 1948 South Australian 100 =

Motor race staged at the Lobethal Circuit

Layout of the Lobethal Circuit (1937-1948)

The 1948 South Australian 100 was a motor race staged at the Lobethal Circuit in South Australia on 1 January 1948. It was contested as a handicap race with the slowest cars starting first and the fastest cars last. The race was staged over 12 laps, a total distance of 105 miles. It was open to cars of any engine size.

The race, which was the second South Australian 100 to be held at Lobethal, was won by Jim Gullan driving a Ballot Oldsmobile.

== Results ==
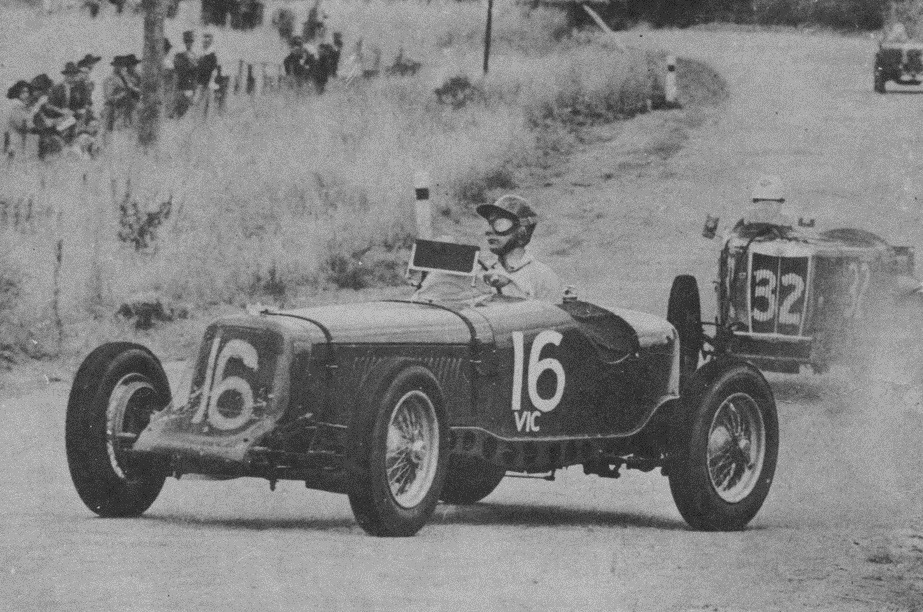
Jim Gullan won the 1948 South Australian 100 driving a Ballot Oldsmobile

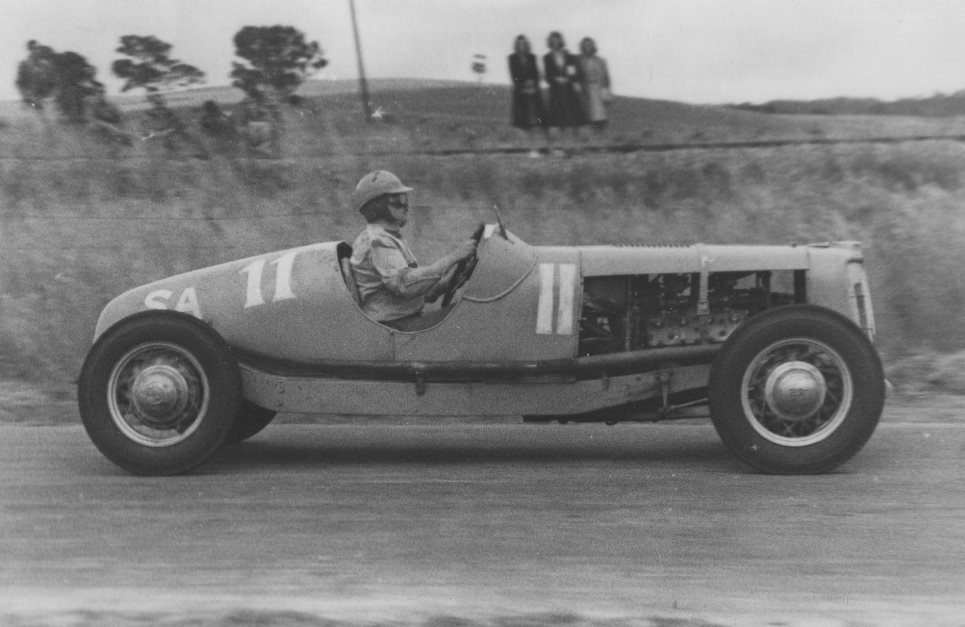
Granton Harrison placed second and set the fastest race time driving the Phillips Ford V8

Position	Driver	No.	Car	Handicap	Time	Laps
1	Jim Gullan	16	Ballot Oldsmobile	11:35	81m 5s	12
2	Granton Harrison	11	Phillips Ford V8	10:10	79m 49s	12
3	Ron Edgerton	32	MG TC Special	16:00	86m 19s	12
4	R. Hamilton	30	MG TC	16:00		12
5	A. Eadie	34	MG TC	16:00		12
6	Norman Andrews	4	Stewand Austin	7:00		12
7	Jim Skinner	24	Ballot Ford V8	13:50		12
8	Harold Clisby	29	MG TC	16:00		12
9	Rick Howard	37	Austin 7 Ulster	20:00		12
10	Harold Tribe	10	Willys Mercury V8	10:10		12
11	David Harvey	35	MG TA	16:00		12
12	Tony Ohlmeyer	28	MG TA	15:00		12
13	Gordon Stewart	26	MG L-type Magna	14:00		12
NC	Tony Gaze	17	HRG Aerodynamic	?		11
NC	Gavin Sandford-Morgan	27	MG C-type s/c	15:00		11
NC	D. Howard	39	MG PB	23:00		11
DNF	Jack Nind	14	MG TB Special	11:00		9
DNF	Bill Patterson	19	MG TC	12:35		8
DNF	John Barraclough	18	MG NE Magnette	12:35		7
DNF	Doug Whiteford	6	Ford V8 Special	9:00		3
DNF	Ern Seeliger	2	Itala Ford V8	Scratch		1
DNS	Lex Davison	22	MG TC	13:00		-
DNS	Peter Vennermark	9	MG Q-type s/c	9:35		-

=== Notes ===
- Weather: Cool and cloudy
- Attendance: 10,000
- Race distance: 12 laps, 105 miles
- Number of starters: 21
- Number of classified finishers: 13
- Fastest time: Granton Harrison, 79m 49s
- Fastest Lap: Doug Whiteford, 6m 7s (88 m.p.h.)
- Teams Prize: Harvey, Hamilton & Ohlmeyer
