= 1940 South Australian Hundred =

Australian motor race

Layout of the Lobethal Circuit (1937-1948)

The 1940 South Australian Hundred was a motor race staged at the Lobethal Circuit in South Australia on 1 January 1940. It was held over 12 laps of the 8¾ mile course, a total distance of 100 miles. The race was contested on a handicap basis with the slowest cars starting first and the fastest last. The "limit man", RS Uffindell (Austin 7), commenced the race 23 minutes before the "virtual scratch man", Alf Barrett (Alfa Romeo Monza).

The race was won by Jack Phillips driving a Ford V8.

== Race results ==
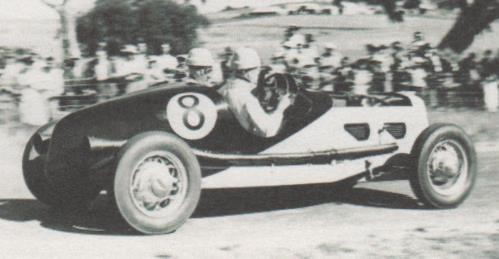
Race winner Jack Phillips (Ford V8)

Position	Driver	No.	Car	Entrant	Handicap	Time	Laps
1	Jack Phillips	8	Ford V8	J Phillips & Parsons	10:00	78:55	12
2	Tony Ohlmeyer	19	MG	A Ohlmeyer	18:00	87:47	12
3	John Nind	18	MG TA	JP Nind	18:00	88:40	12
4	Les Burrows	9	Hudson	L Burrows	10:00	81:08	12
5	Tom Lancey	17	MG T-type	JF Crouch	18:00	90:56	12
6	Colin Dunne	3	MG K3 Magnette	CA Dunne	8:00	82:54	12
7	AV McDonough	12	Ford V8	AV McDonough	13:00	93:38	12
8	Aub Ramsay	21	Riley	Jackson Motors Ltd	18:00	97:51	12
9	Frank Kleinig	2	Hudson	F Kleinig	2:00	83:52	12
NC	Jim Gullan	7	Ford Ballot	J Gullan	8:00	-	?
DNF	Alf Barrett	1	Alfa Romeo Monza	AI Barrett	1:00	-	?
DNF	Doug Whiteford	11	Ford V8	D Whiteford	13:00	-	?
DNF	Jim Boughton	14	Morgan	JS Boughton	18:00	-	?
DNF	Allan Tomlinson	4	MG Special	AG Tomlinson	8:00	-	9
DNF	Jack Nelson	5	Ford Ballot	J Nelson	8:00	-	4
DNF	Tom Brady	22	Bugatti Brescia	TM Brady	19:00	-	4
DNF	RS Uffindell	23	Austin 7	RS Uffindell	24:00	-	4
DNF	C Anderson	6	Frazer Nash Special	GM Joshua	8:00	-	2
DNF	Neville Bakewell	20	MG	DV McMichael	18:00	-	0

- Race distance: 12 laps, 100 miles
- Starters: 19
- Fastest time: Jack Phillips, 78 min 55 sec, 81.5 mph
- Fastest lap: Alf Barrett, 5 min 48 sec, 92 mph
- Attendance: 25,000
- Weather: Hot, about 102° F
