= 1938 South Australian Grand Prix =

Layout of the Lobethal Circuit (1937-1948)

The 1938 South Australian Grand Prix was a motor race staged at the Lobethal Circuit in South Australia, Australia on 3 January 1938. It was held over 12 laps, a total distance of 100 miles. The race, which was the second South Australian Grand Prix, was contested on a handicap basis with the first car starting 30 minutes before the "Scratch" car.

The race was won by South Australian Noel Campbell driving a Singer Bantam.

== Race results ==
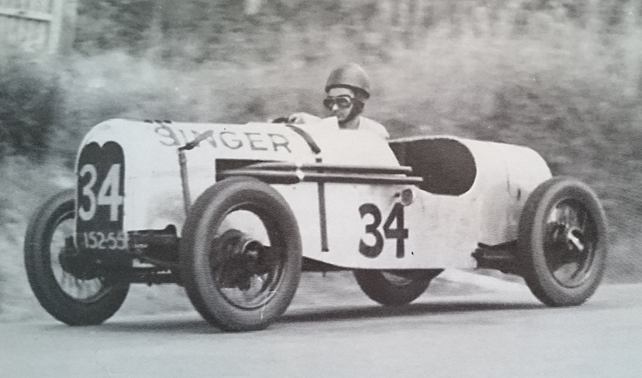
The race winning Singer Bantam of Noel Campbell

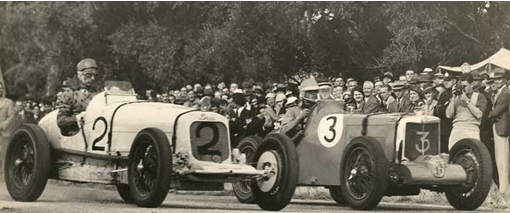
Reg Nutt's No 2 Day Special and Colin Dunne's No 3 MG K3 Magnette prior to the start. Nutt established the fastest race time and Dunne set the fastest lap of the race

Position	Driver	No.	Car	Entrant	Handicap	Time
1	Noel Campbell	34	Singer Bantam	Noel Campbell	27:30	97:37
2	Colin Dunne	3	MG K3 Magnette	Colin Dunne	4:00	77:39
3	Tony Ohlmeyer	24	MG T-type	Tony Ohlmeyer	17:00	90:55
4	Ron Uffindell	33	Austin 7	Ron Uffindell	24:00	98.33
5	Jim Boughton	27	Morgan 4/4	Jim Boughton	18:00	92:54
6	Reg Nutt	2	Day Special	JA Day	1:30	77:33
7	Les Murphy	20	MG P-type	Les Murphy	14:00	90:31
8	Fred Thwaites	14	Ford V8	FJ Thwaites	9:30	89:20
?	Arthur Beasley	21	MG P-type	D Sowter	16:00	
?	GA Cowper	35	Morris 8/40	GA Cowper	30:00	
?	A Aitken	22	Riley 9	A Aitken	17:00	
DNF	Bob Lea-Wright	10	Terraplane	RA Lea-Wright	09:00	
?	Lyster Jackson	4	MG K3 Magnette	LJ Jackson	05:00	
?	Alf Barrett	30	Morris Cowley	A Barrett	19:00	
?	AV McDonough	13	Ford V8	AV McDonough	12:00	
DNF	Ash Moulden	17	Sunbeam GP	MA Moulden	13:00	
?	Tim Joshua	5	Frazer Nash	G Joshua	05:00	
?	Jack Day	23	Bugatti	JA Day	17:00	
DNF	Jack Phillips	7	Ford V8	JK Phillips	08:00	
?	Harry Beith	9	Terraplane	H Beith	09:00	
DNF	Allan Sinclair	1	Alta	A Sinclair	Scratch	
?	LE Vinall	18	Vauxhall 30/98	LE Vinall	13:00	
?	T Dowe	12	Fronty Ford	T Dowe	09:00	
?	AE Powell	31	Alvis 12/50	AE Powell	21:30	

Notes:

- Race distance: 100 miles
- Starters: 24
- Finishers: 8
- Fastest Time: Reg Nutt, Day Special, 77 min 33 sec
- Fastest Lap: Colin Dunne, MG K3 Magnette, 6 min 17 sec, 83 mph
