= Lobethal Circuit =

- Lobethal Road Circuit track map
- Location: Lobethal, South Australia
- Coordinates: 34°53′59″S 138°52′00″E
- Opened: 1937
- Closed: 1948
- Major events: 1939 Australian Grand Prix
- Length: 13.92 km (8.65 mi)
- Race lap record: 5:40 (Alf Barrett, A.I. Barrett, 1939)

The Lobethal Circuit was a motor racing course centred on the South Australian town of Lobethal in the Mount Lofty Ranges, 22 miles from the state capital, Adelaide. It was utilized for four race meetings from 1937 to 1948, hosting a number of major races including the 1939 Australian Grand Prix. Today the roads of the circuit make up a part of the Tour Down Under international bicycle race.

== Layout ==
Roughly triangular in shape, the circuit comprised temporarily closed public roads which passed through the towns of Charleston and Lobethal. Two of the four approach roads to Lobethal were utilised as was the main road through Charleston, each of these having sealed surfaces. It is the longest circuit to have been used in Australian motor racing, and the average speed for the 1939 Australian Grand Prix was the fastest of any Australian Grand Prix prior to 1956, with race winner Tomlinson averaging 84.00 mph.

...a hump-backed bridge followed by a curve, more of a kink, and from the start of the race this was the first little trick in the circuit. On this long, very fast leg of the circuit, roughly parallel to the railway and the Onkaparinga River, it was mostly flat and mostly flat out. Just six or seven gentle sweeps or kinks and the crowd at the hotel in Charleston to keep the drivers interested as the tachos showed top revs for almost three and a half miles. Then came Kayannie Corner, a sharp intersection with an included angle of about 60 degrees, with a gentle downhill rush across the river then a climb to the brow of the hill overlooking the town. Here it got interesting as a sharp brow led into the esses, downhill esses that were tight enough to claim a lot of cars and provide plenty of spectators with a great view. The straight that led into town came from the last left hander dipped and rose to another crest, but then the road simply dropped away and heavy braking was the order of the day as the T-intersection with the main street was reached. The circuit then climbed again, with a dip towards the end of the shopping centre before levelling out between the house then swinging right and beginning the roller coaster ride that sorted the men from the boys. It’s this section that defies adequate description, the three miles of ups and downs, of blind brows, of fast curves between the dairy farms that made Lobethal a legend. The Charleston section tested the engines, the run to town tested the brakes and handling, but like nowhere else in Australia - and I include McPhillamy Park, the Needle’s Eye, and every other fast corner - this stretch tested the commitment of the drivers.

— Doug Whiteford

== History ==
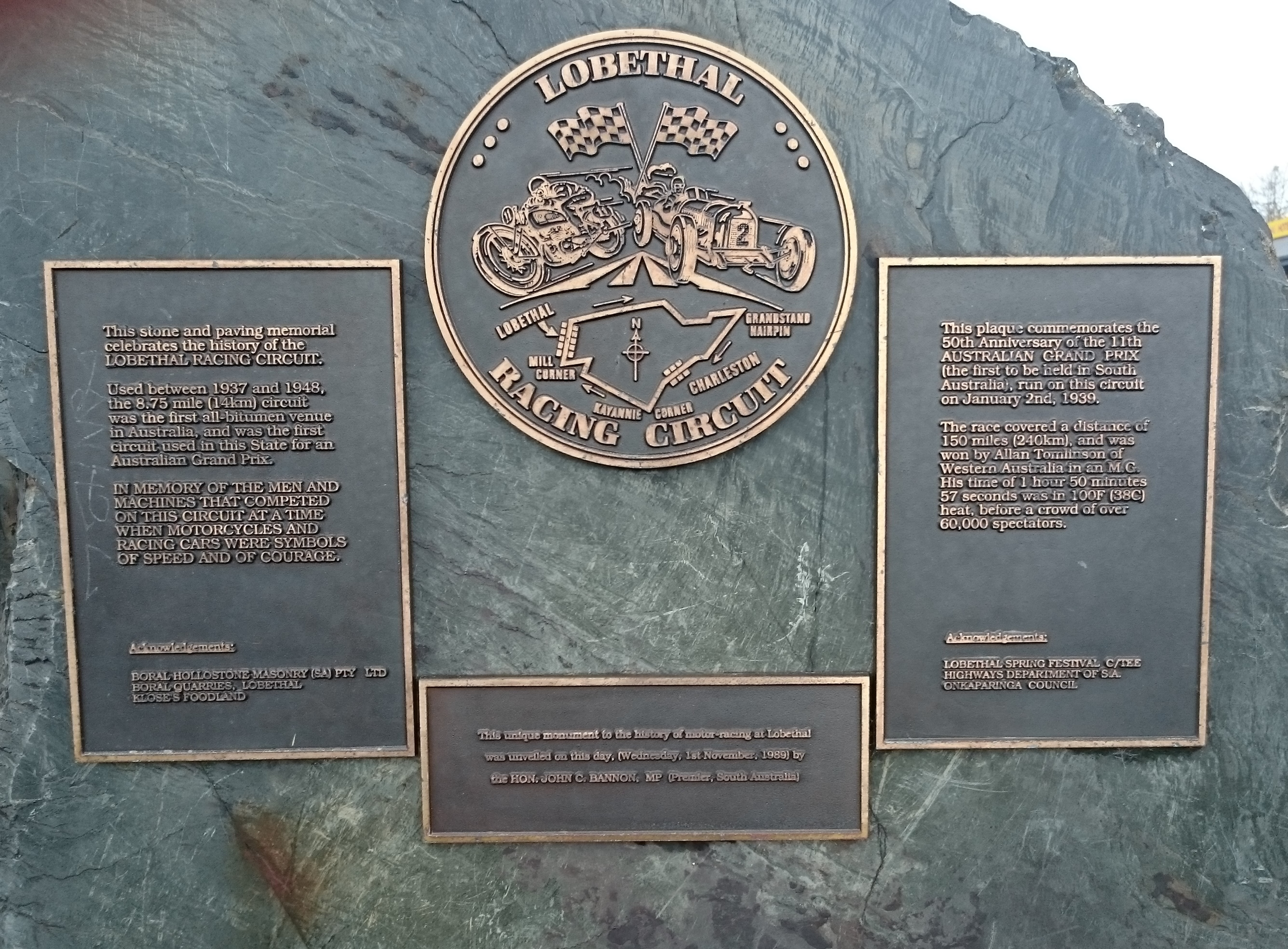
This plaque, which commemorates the running of the 1939 Australian Grand Prix, is the situated in the main street of Lobethal

The circuit was first used for a combined motorcycle and car race meeting held 27 December 1937 through 3 January 1938. Similar meetings were held in 1938/39 and 1939/40, with the former featuring the 1939 Australian Grand Prix for cars. A fourth meeting, again a combined affair, was held on 1 January 1948. The 1948 meeting would be the last to be held at Lobethal, with attempts by the organizing group to re-establish racing at the circuit thwarted in 1951 by the introduction of South Australian Government legislation prohibiting the use of public roads for racing.

== Major races ==
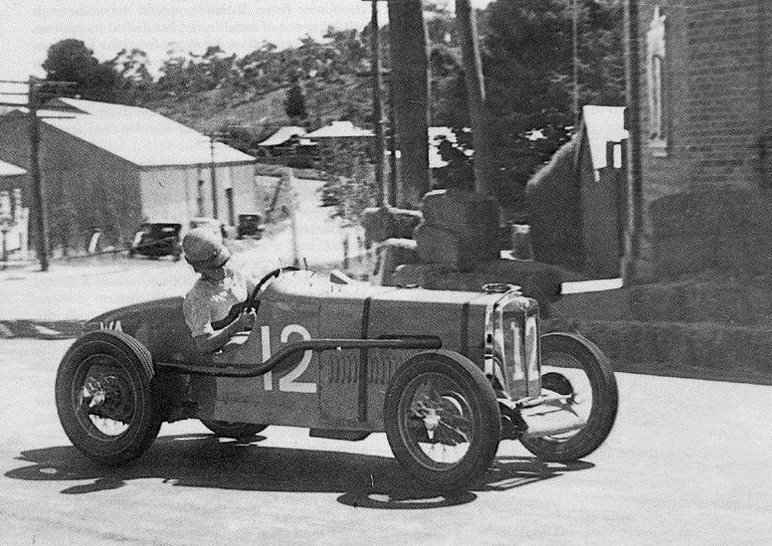
Race winner Allan Tomlinson (MG TA) contesting the 1939 Australian Grand Prix on the Lobethal Circuit

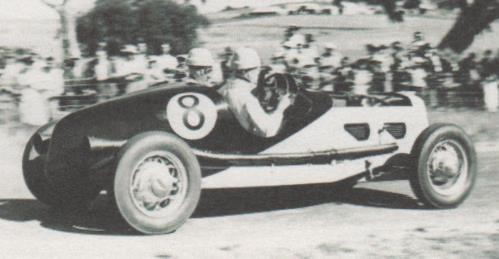
Race winner Jack Phillips (Ford V8) contesting the 1940 South Australian Hundred on the Lobethal Circuit

The following table lists the feature motorcycle race and the feature car race at each of the four race meetings staged at the Lobethal Circuit.

Year	Race	Laps	Distance (miles)	Date	Winner	Motorcycle / Car
1937	South Australia Senior Tourist Trophy	12	100	27 December 1937	Clem Foster	Norton
1938	South Australian Grand Prix for Motor Cars	12	100	3 January 1938	Noel Campbell	Singer Bantam
1938	Australian Senior Tourist Trophy	12	100	26 December 1938	George Hannaford	Velocette
1939	Australian Grand Prix	17	150	2 January 1939	Alan Tomlinson	MG TA
1939	South Australian Senior Tourist Trophy	12	100	26 December 1939	Frank Mussett	Velocette
1940	South Australian Hundred	12	100	1 January 1940	Jack Phillips	Ford V8
1948	Sternol 50 Open Handicap	9	75	1 January 1948	F Steer	Velocette
1948	South Australian 100	12	100	1 January 1948	Jim Gullan	Ballot Oldsmobile
