= 1947 Australian Grand Prix =

- Formula Libre handicap race

Race details
- Date: 6 October 1947
- Location: Mount Panorama Circuit, Bathurst, New South Wales
- Course: Temporary road circuit
- Course length: 6.12 km (3.84 miles)
- Distance: 38 laps, 241.35 km (150 miles)
- Weather: Sunny

Fastest lap
| Driver | (Australia) Alf Barrett | Alfa Romeo Monza |
- Time: 3 min 6 sec

Podium
| First | (Australia) Bill Murray | MG |
| Second | (Australia) Dick Bland | Mercury Special |
| Third | (Australia) Lex Davison | Mercedes-Benz |

The 1947 Australian Grand Prix was a Formula Libre motor race held at the Mount Panorama Circuit, near Bathurst in New South Wales, Australia on 6 October 1947. The race, which had 22 starters, was held over 38 laps of the six kilometre circuit, for a total race distance of 241 kilometres.

It was the twelfth Australian Grand Prix and the first to have been held after the conclusion of World War II. Racing in Australia resumed in 1946, but it took until 1947 for a group, in this case the Australian Sporting Car Club, to take on the running of the Grand Prix. Police opposition to racing at Mount Panorama led to the postponement of the race from Easter to October.

The race, a handicap event as was the tradition in the immediate post-war period, was won by Bill Murray racing his MG TC. Murray took the lead on the last lap of the race after a tyre failure on Ray Mitchell's Jeep/Ford Special caused the race leader to slow dramatically. Mitchell limped home for fourth position. Future Grand Prix stars also passed Mitchell, second was taken by Dick Bland in his Mercury Special. Bland would claim two more podiums over the four years but a win would be elusive. Third was taken by Lex Davison driving a 7.6 litre Mercedes-Benz SSK 38/250. Davison would go on to become the Grand Prix's most prolific winner, even though his career would be cut short by his death at Sandown in 1965, Davison would win the race four times. Davison also completed the race in the shortest time, a prelude to the future of the race over the next decade and a half.

Alf Barrett (Alfa Romeo Monza) started the race from scratch, 37 minutes after the first starter, Les Burrows (MG J2). Barrett retired on lap 29 with valve trouble, having earlier set the fastest lap of the race at 3 minutes 6 seconds. He also achieved the fastest speed of 123.5 mph through the flying quarter-mile.

The Under 1500cc Championship was awarded to Alf Najar and the Over 1500cc Championship to Lex Davison, both titles being decided on net race time, disregarding handicaps.

The race was watched by 20,000 spectators.

== Classification ==
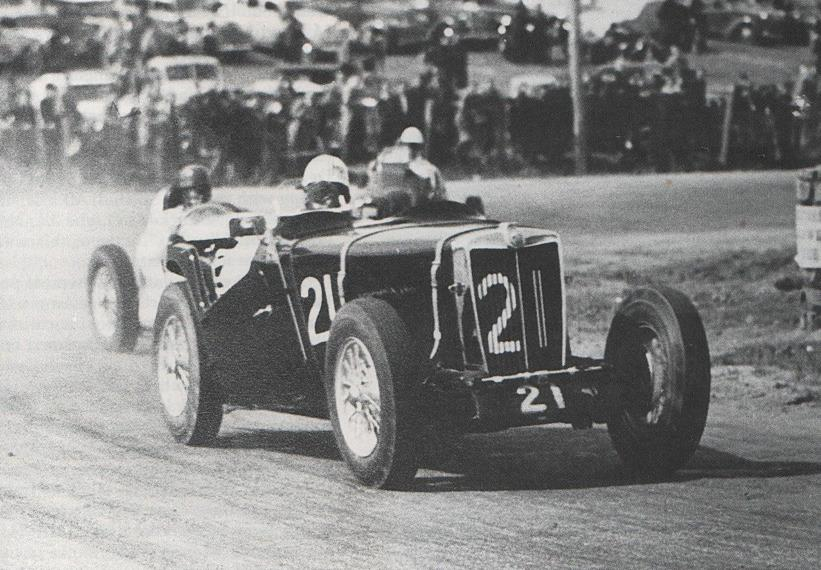
Race winner Bill Murray (MG TC) contesting the 1947 Australian Grand Prix

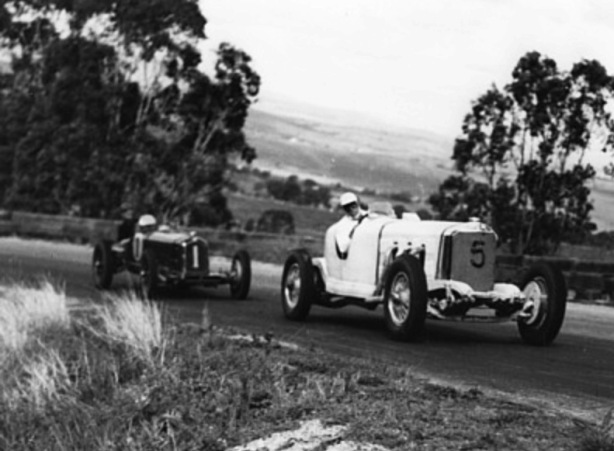
Lex Davison (Mercedes-Benz 38-250) placed third on handicap, set fastest race time and won the Over 1500cc Championship

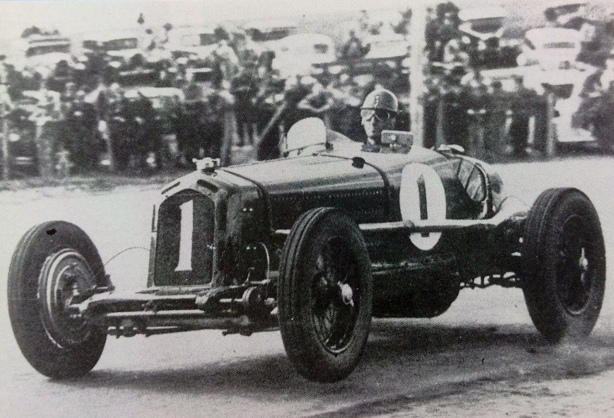
Alf Barrett (Alfa Romeo Monza) set the fastest lap but did not finish the race.

Results as follows.

| Pos | No. | Driver | Car / engine | Laps | Time | Handicap (minutes) |
|---|---|---|---|---|---|---|
| 1 | 21 | (Australia) Bill Murray | MG TC / MG 1.3L | 38 | 2h 39m 46s | 25.5 |
| 2 | 7 | (Australia) Dick Bland | Mercury Special / Mercury 3.7L | 38 | 2h 40m 22s | 15.0 |
| 3 | 5 | (Australia) Lex Davison | Mercedes-Benz SSK 38/250 / Mercedes-Benz 7.6L | 38 | 2h 40m 33s | 10.5 |
| 4 | 11 | (Australia) Ray Mitchell | Jeep/Ford Special / Ford 3.6L | 38 | 2h 41m 09s | 17.0 |
| 5 | 23 | (Australia) Tom Sulman | Sulman Singer Special / Singer 1.0L | 38 | 2h 41m 48s | 28.0 |
| 6 | 15 | (Australia) Alf Najar | MG TB Special / MG 1.3L | 38 | 2h 41m 37s | 19.5 |
| 7 | 14 | (Australia) Harry Monday | Mercury Special / Mercury 3.9L | 38 | 2h 41m 59s | 17.0 |
| 8 | 17 | (Australia) John Barraclough | MG NE Magnette / MG 1.3L | 38 | 2h 42m 10s | 21.0 |
| 9 | 13 | (Australia) Dougal MacLachlan | MG TA Special / MG 1.4L | 38 | 2h 43m 55s | 19.5 |
| 10 | 28 | (Australia) Les Burrows | MG J2 / MG 0.8L | 38 | 2h 44m 37s | 37.0 |
| 11 | 19 | (Australia) Ron Ward | MG TB / MG 1.3L | 38 | 2h 45m 37s | 25.5 |
| 12 | 27 | (Australia) Bruce Myers | Riley Imp / Riley 1.1L | 38 | 2h 46m 01s | 34.0 |
| 13 | 18 | (Australia) Bill Nunn | MG TB / MG 1.3L | 38 | 2h 47m 55s | 25.5 |
| 14 | 22 | (Australia) Elliott Forbes-Robinson | MG TC / MG 1.3L | 38 | 2h 48m 28s | 25.5 |
| Ret | 1 | (Australia) Alf Barrett | Alfa Romeo Monza / Alfa Romeo 2.4L | 28 | | Scratch |
| Ret | 9 | (Australia) Jack Murray | Bugatti Type 39 / Ford 3.6L (DM Special) | 28 | | 15.0 |
| Ret | 2 | (Australia) Frank Kleinig | Kleinig-Hudson 8 Special / Hudson 4.2L | 26 | | 6.0 |
| Ret | 20 | (Australia) George Pearse | MG TB / MG 1.3L | 22 | | 25.5 |
| Ret | 26 | (Australia) Len Phillips | Austin 7 / Austin 0.8L | 20 | | 31.0 |
| Ret | 3 | (Australia) Hope Bartlett | Riley / Riley 2.0L | | | 7.5 |
| Ret | 4 | (Australia) Ron Ewing | Buick Special / Buick 3.8L | | | 10.5 |
| Ret | 16 | (Australia) Walter Mathison | Jaguar SS100 / Standard 2.7L | | | 20.0 |
| DNS | 8 | (Australia) Alec Mildren | Ford V8 Special / Ford 3.6L | | | 15.0 |
| DNS | 12 | (Australia) Dennis Curran | Mercury Special / Mercury 3.9L | | | 17.0 |
| DNS | 29 | (Australia) Ken Tubman | MG K3 Magnette / MG 1.1L s/c | | | 15.0 |
| DNS | 24 | (Australia) Len Golding | MG NE / MG 1.1L | | | 28.0 |

| Preceded by 1939 Australian Grand Prix | Australian Grand Prix; 1947 | Succeeded by 1948 Australian Grand Prix |
