= 1939 Australian Grand Prix =

- Formula Libre handicap race

Race details
- Date: 2 January 1939
- Location: Lobethal, South Australia
- Course: Temporary road circuit
- Course length: 13.8 km (8.6 miles)
- Distance: 17 laps, 241.35 km (150 miles)
- Weather: Sunny & hot

Fastest lap
Driver	(Australia) Alf Barrett	Alfa Romeo
- Time: 5:40

Podium
First	(Australia) Allan Tomlinson	MG
Second	(Australia) Bob Lea-Wright	Terraplane Special
Third	(Australia) Jack Phillips	Ford Special

The 1939 Australian Grand Prix was a motor race held on the Lobethal Circuit in South Australia, Australia on 2 January 1939. The race was staged over 17 laps of the 14 kilometre circuit, the longest ever used for the Grand Prix, for a race distance of 241 kilometres. The Grand Prix meeting was organised by Lobethal Carnivals Ltd. and the Sporting Car Club of South Australia.

The race was the eleventh Australian Grand Prix and the second since the 1938 revival of the event. The Lobethal Circuit comprised three country roads in a roughly triangular formation, passing through the town of Lobethal and the nearby village of Charleston. The advantage of using these country roads was that, for the first time, the Grand Prix was held on a bitumen sealed surface instead of on dirt roads. The race utilised a handicap start with the slowest cars starting first and the fastest cars last, the winner being the first to complete the stipulated number of laps. Trophies were awarded for the first three places with prize money paid to the first seven finishers. Prize money and a trophy were also awarded for Fastest Time.

The race was won by relatively unknown Western Australian racer Allan Tomlinson driving a supercharged MG T. Bob Lea-Wright's Terraplane Special finished in second position ahead of Jack Phillips' Ford Special. The winning car's average speed was the fastest of any Australian Grand Prix prior to 1956, with Tomlinson averaging 84.00 mph. The fastest actual time over the race distance was recorded by Jack Saywell driving an Alfa Romeo.

The entry of J O'Dea crashed at the Gumeracha turn late in the race and driver Vern Leech was killed almost instantaneously.

Later in 1939, Australia would declare war on the AXIS powers. As World War II enveloped Australia, motor racing wound down and would not resume until the mid-1940s. The Australian Grand Prix itself would be revived in 1947.

== Classification ==
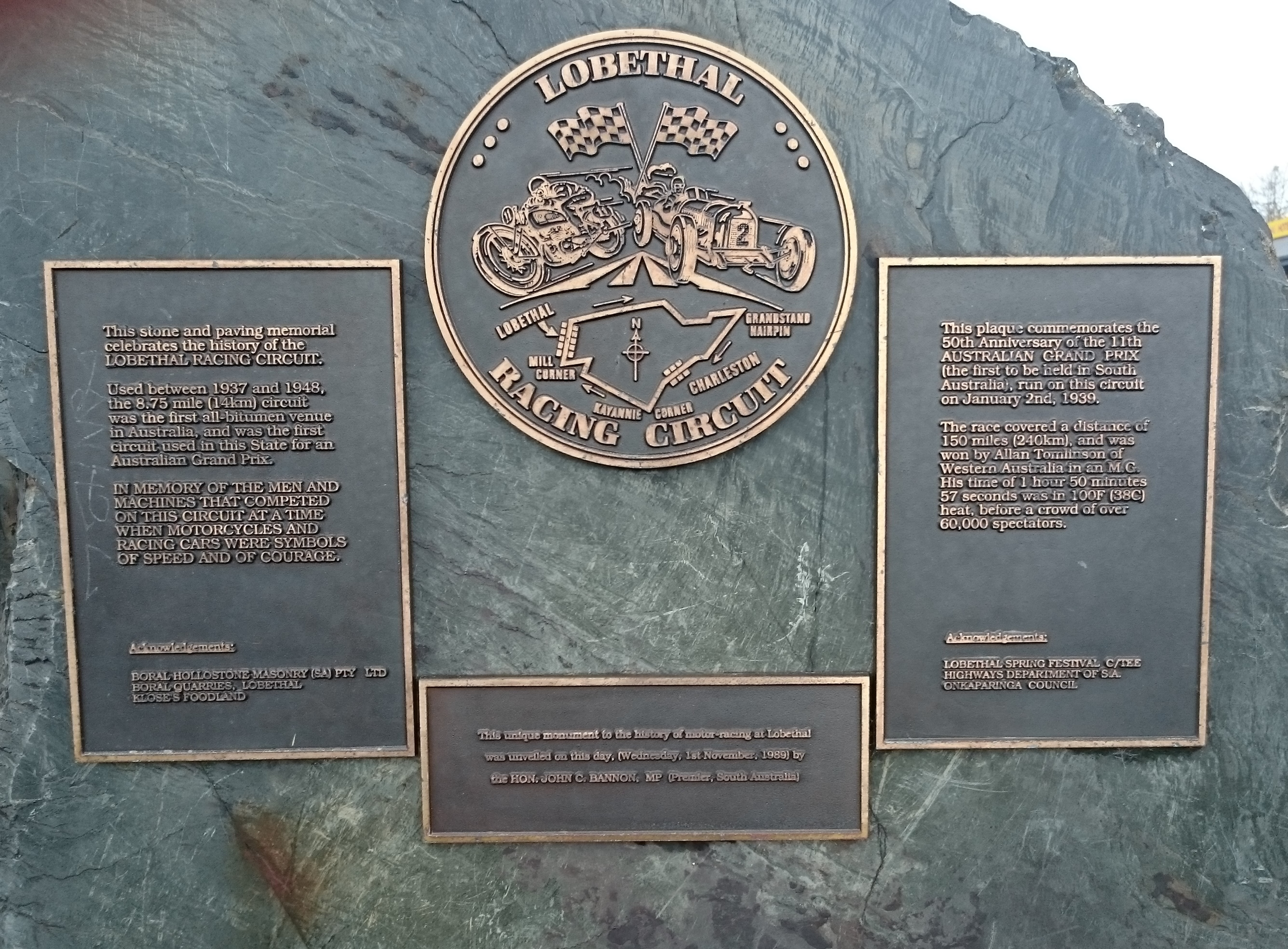
This plaque, which commemorates the running of the 1939 Australian Grand Prix, is the situated in the main street of Lobethal

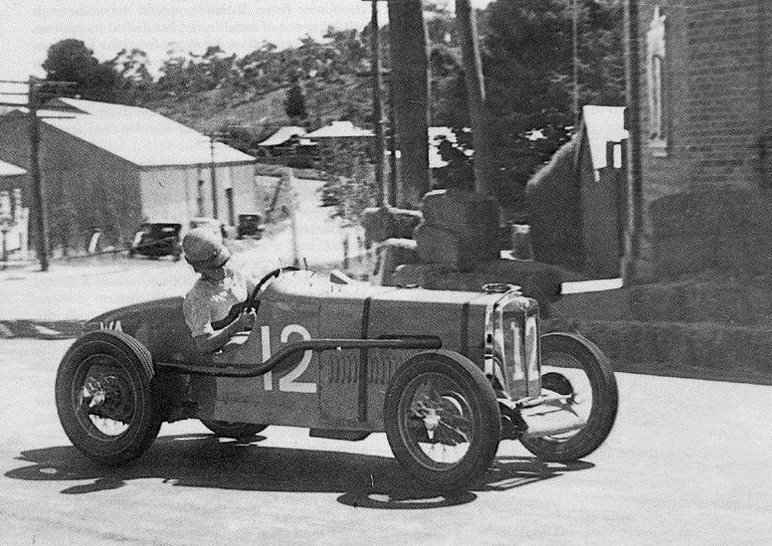
Race winner Allan Tomlinson (MG TA) contesting the 1939 Australian Grand Prix

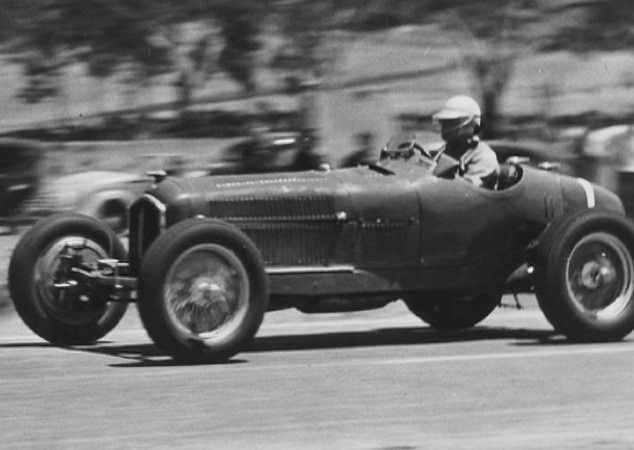
Jack Saywell (Alfa Romeo P3) placed sixth and completed the event in the fastest actual time

Results as follows.

Pos	No.	Driver	Car / Engine	Entrant	Handicap	Laps	Time
1	12	(Australia) Allan Tomlinson	MG TA / MG s/c 1.3L	AG Tomlinson	11m 30s	17	2h 00m 27s
2	19	(Australia) Bob Lea-Wright	Terraplane Special / Terraplane	RA Lea-Wright	17m 00s	17	2h 02m 31s
3	15	(Australia) Jack Phillips	Ford Special / Ford 3.6L	JK Phillips	12m 45s	17	2h 02m 46s
4	3	(Australia) John Snow	Delahaye 135 3.6L	JF Snow	4m 15s	17	2h 04m 11s
5	17	(Australia) Les Burrows	Hudson Special / Hudson	L Burrows	12m 45s	17	2h 04m 38s
6	1	(Australia) Jack Saywell	Alfa Romeo P3 / Alfa Romeo 2.9L	J Saywell	Scratch	17	2h 06m 48s
7	6	(Australia) John Crouch	Alfa Romeo 8C 2300 Le Mans / Alfa Romeo s/c 2.4L	JF Crouch	5m 00s	17	2h 08m 33s
8	2	(Australia) Alf Barrett	Alfa Romeo 8C 2300 / Alfa Romeo s/c 2.4L	AI Barrett	2m 50s	17	2h 09m 11s
9	20	(Australia) Raymond Curlewis	MG TB / MG 1.3L	RF Curlewis	21m 00s	17	2h 09m 57s
Ret	23	(Australia) Robert Manser (Australia) Lyster Jackson	MG N / MG 1.3L	RW Manser	21m 00s	14	
Ret	26	(Australia) Vern Leech	MG P / MG 0.8L	J O'Dea	21m 00s	14	
Ret	24	(Australia) Russell Bowes	MG N / MG 1.3L	RN Bowes	21m 00s	10	
Ret	25	(Australia) Jim Boughton	Morgan 4/4 / Coventry Climax 1.1L	JS Boughton	21m 00s	10	
Ret	13	(Australia) Tim Joshua	Frazer Nash / Meadows 1.5L	CM Joshua	11m 30s	7	
Ret	31	(Australia) J Wilson	MG L / MG 1.1L	JW Wilson	21m 00s	7	
Ret	16	(Australia) Clifford Downing (United Kingdom) Alan Sinclair	Riley Brooklands / 1.5L	CRE Downing	12m 45s	5	
Ret	4	(Australia) Frank Kleinig	Kleinig-Hudson 8 Special / Hudson 4.2L	F Kleinig	4m 15s	3	
DNS	7	(United Kingdom) Alan Sinclair	Sunbeam Special	AG Sinclair	8m 30s	-	
DNS	10	(Australia) Colin Dunne	MG K3 / MG s/c 1.1L	CA Dunne	10m 00s	-	
DNS	11	(Australia) Jim Gullan	Ballot	J Gullan	10m 00s	-	
DNS	21	(Australia) John Summers	MG N / MG 1.3L	JF Summers	21m 00s	-	

=== Notes ===
- Fastest time: Jack Saywell: 1:45.48
- Fastest race lap: Alf Barrett: 5:40s: 93.52 mph
- Raymond Curlewis was entered to drive an MG N Type in the Grand Prix but, having suffered a rollover in a supporting race, competed in the Grand Prix in an MG TB.

Preceded by 1938 Australian Grand Prix	Australian Grand Prix; 1939	Succeeded by 1947 Australian Grand Prix
