= 1945 Coupe des Prisonniers =

1945 Coupe des Prisonniers Grand Prix

Race details
- Date: 9 September 1945
- Official name: Coupe des Prisonniers
- Location: Bois de Boulogne, Paris
- Course: Temporary road circuit
- Course length: 2.826 km (1.756 mi)
- Distance: 43 laps, 121.52 km (75.51 mi)

Fastest lap
Driver	(France) Jean-Pierre Wimille	Bugatti
- Time: 1:27.8

Podium
First	(France) Jean-Pierre Wimille	Bugatti
Second	(France) Raymond Sommer	Talbot-Lago
Third	(France) Eugène Chaboud	Delahaye

The 1945 Coupe des Prisonniers was one of three motor races held on 9 September 1945 at the Bois de Boulogne, in Paris. They were the first notable motor races to take place after the cessation of the Second World War.

The 43-lap race was won by Bugatti driver Jean-Pierre Wimille, with Raymond Sommer over a minute behind in a Talbot-Lago and Eugène Chaboud third in a Delahaye. Wimille set fastest lap.

== Results ==
Pos	No.	Driver	Constructor	Time/Retired
1	1	(France) Jean-Pierre Wimille	Bugatti Type 59/50B	1:03:33.3, 114.72kph
2	2	(France) Raymond Sommer	Talbot T26 MC	+1:20.0
3	8	(France) Eugène Chaboud	Delahaye 135S	+3 laps
4	11	(France) Henri Trillaud	Delahaye 135S	+4 laps
5	5	(France) Marcel Balsa	Bugatti Type 51	+5 laps
6	12	(France) Joseph Chotard	Delahaye 135S	+6 laps
7	9	(France) Louis Villeneuve	Delahaye 135S	+9 laps
NC	7	(France) Maurice Trintignant	Bugatti Type 35C/51	
NC	16	(France) Raymond de Saugé	Bugatti Type 57S	
NC	15	(France) Paul Friderich	Bugatti Type 55	
NC	14	(France) Georges Grignard	Delahaye 135S	
NC	3	(France) Philippe Étancelin	Alfa Romeo 8C-2300	
NC	10	(France) Emile Cornet	Delahaye 135S	
NC	17	(France) Roger Wormser	Delahaye 135S	
NC	4	(France) Louis Gérard	Maserati 8CM	
NC	6	(France) Pierre Levegh	Talbot-Lago 150C	
