= Ballot (automobile) =

French automobile manufacturer

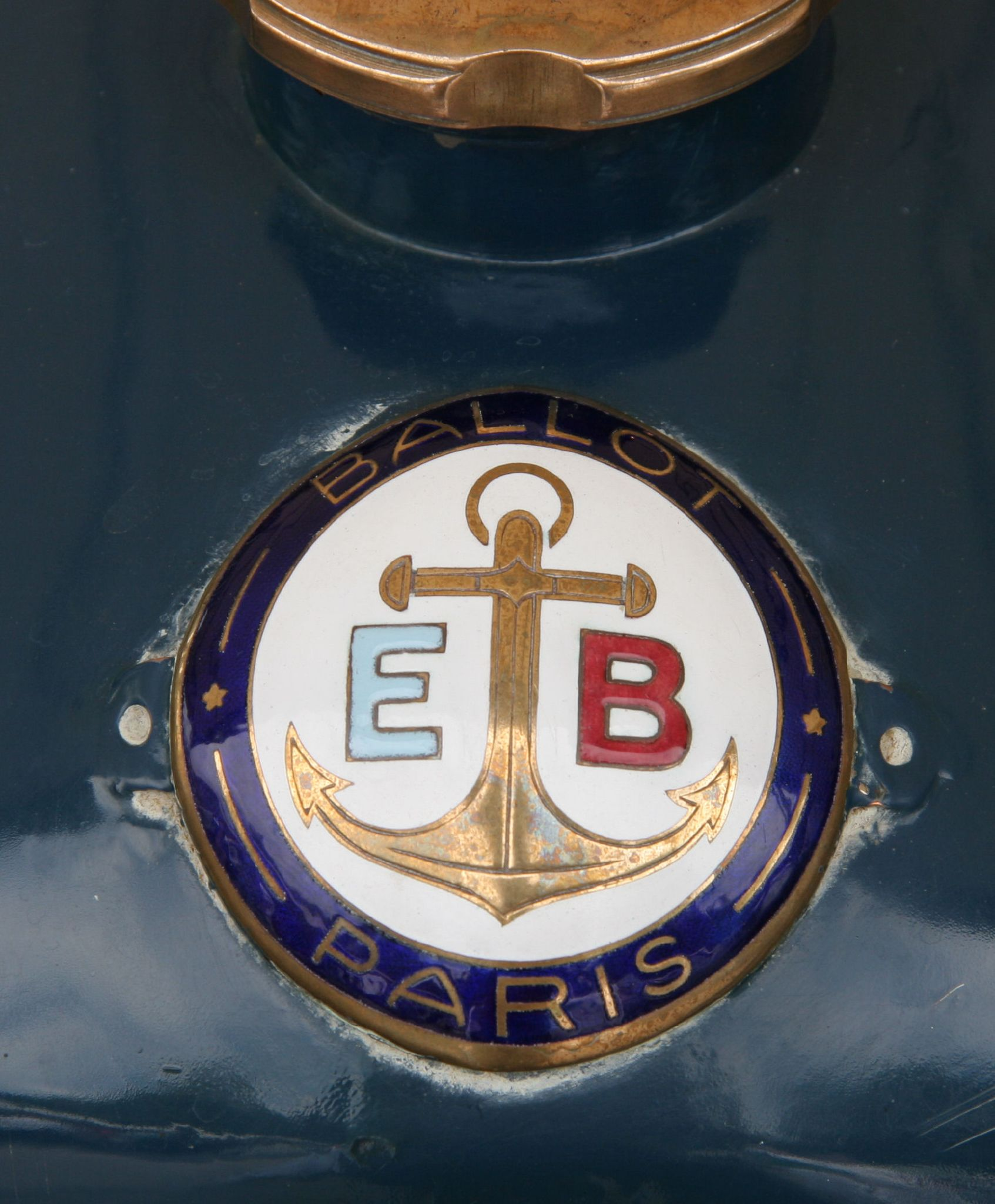
- Founded: 1905
- Founders: Gabriel Ernest Maurice Ballot and Julien Faivre and
- Defunct: 1932
- Headquarters: Boulevard Brune, Paris (France)
- Products: Cars

Ballot was a French manufacturer, initially of engines, that also made automobiles between 1919 and 1932. Ernest Ballot became well known as a designer of reliable engines. He helped Ettore Bugatti in developing his first engines.

== Origins ==
Ernest Ballot and Julien Faivre founded their company at the Boulevard Brune in south-central Paris in 1905.Ernest Ballot's brother Albert was also involved early in the company's life. Ernest Ballot was a former naval officer, which explains the "anchor" that featured in the badges on the cars.

Before World War I the factory concentrated on marine and industrial engines, and from 1910 or 1911 they also offered automobile engines.

The company was re-founded as Etablissements Ballot SA in 1910.

== Sporting successes ==
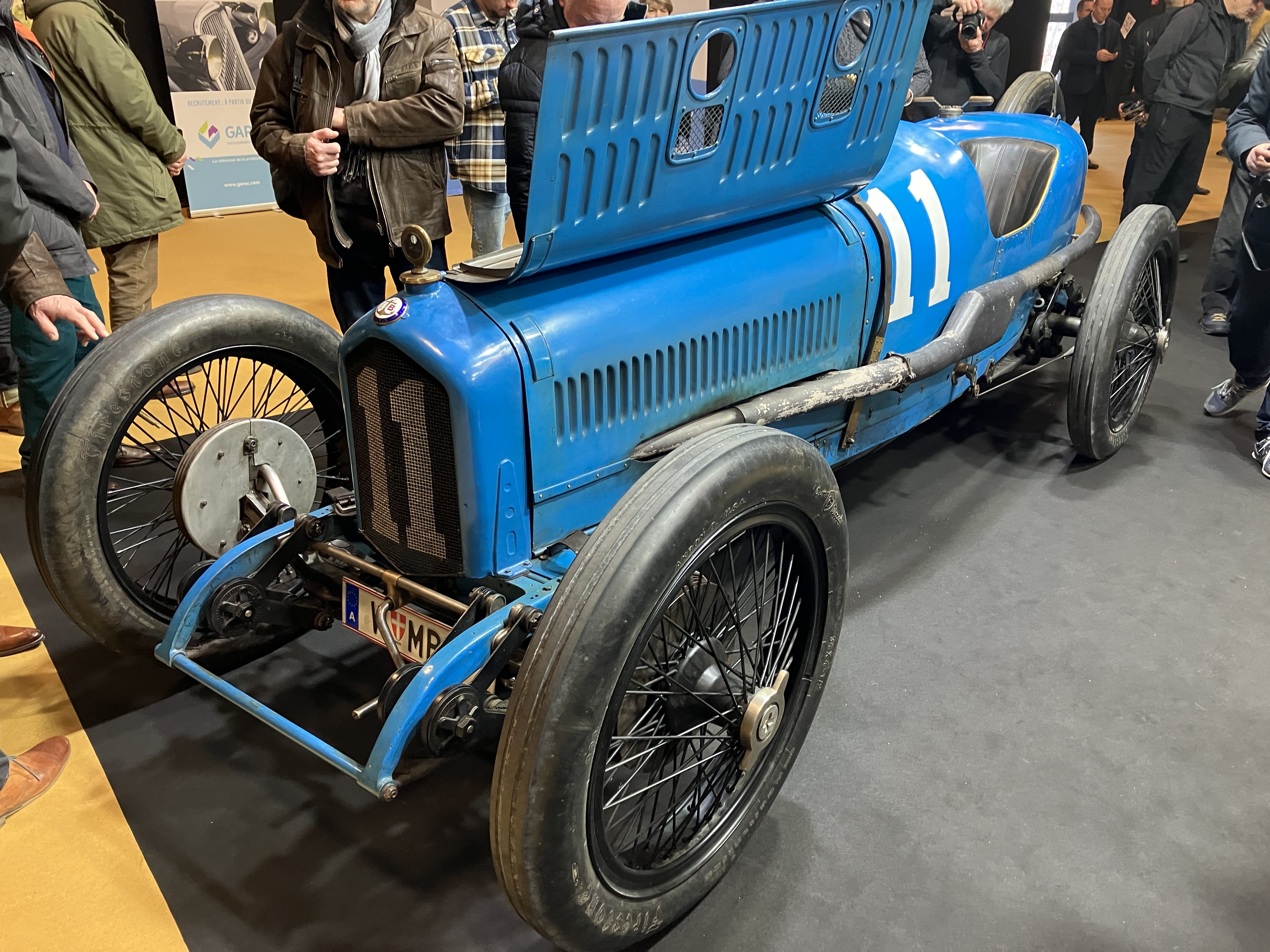
1920 Ballot 3/8 LC

There is little sign that Ernest Ballot himself took much interest in automobiles until December 1918. That was the month in which he had a significant conversation with René Thomas, a leading racing driver who had won the 1914 Indianapolis 500 race driving a Delage. Ballot was persuaded to build four 4.8-litre cars that would carry the "Ballot" name and compete in the forthcoming Indianapolis 500 race, scheduled for 30 May 1919. Time seemed very short, but Ballot lost no time, notably recruiting the Swiss born engineer Ernest Henry who had already worked on preparing Peugeot cars for their successful participation in the 1914 Indianapolis 500 race. Ballot's cars competed in the 1919 race, two of them finishing in 4th and 11th places. A Ballot vehicle driven by René Thomas also finished second in the 1919 Targa Florio. Ballot was sufficiently encouraged to return the next year, and in the 1920 Indianapolis 500 race a Ballot driven by René Thomas finished in second place: Ballots also took fifth and seventh places. Ralph DePalma, an American national champion and winner of the 1915 Indianapolis 500, drove a Ballot to win the 1920 Elgin Trophy.

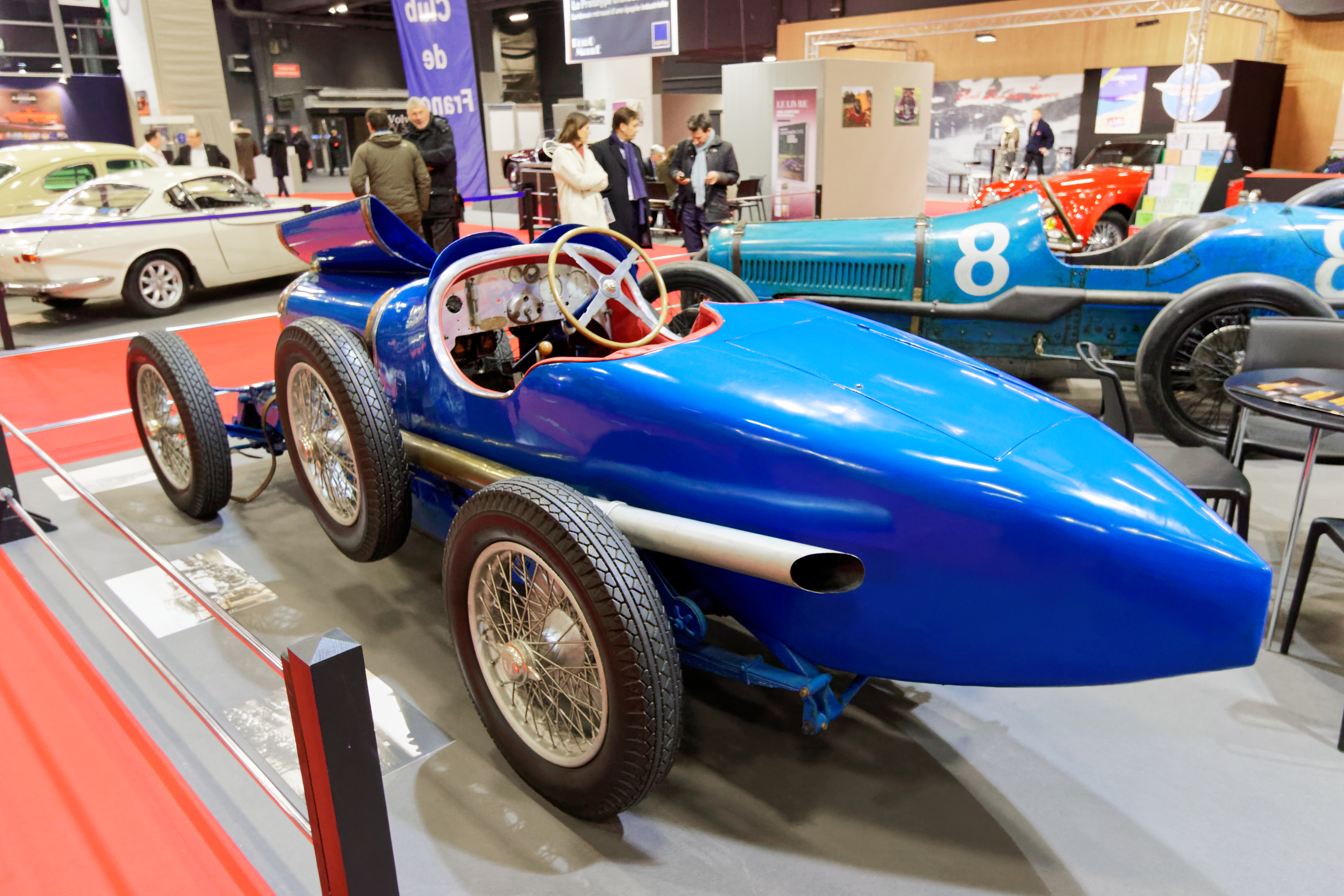
1920 Ballot

More successes followed, on both sides of the Atlantic. DePalma finished second in the 1921 French Grand Prix and French driver Jules Goux finished third. Goux went on to win the inaugural Italian Grand Prix at Brescia, Italy in 1921, driving a Ballot. Second place was taken by the team leader Jean Chassagne on a sister car; a year before, in 1920 Chassagne made the fastest BARC lap of the year at Brooklands on a 4.9-litre Ballot, coming again second. A Ballot with a straight-eight-cylinder 4.9-litre engine competed in the 1921 French Grand Prix.

== Road cars ==
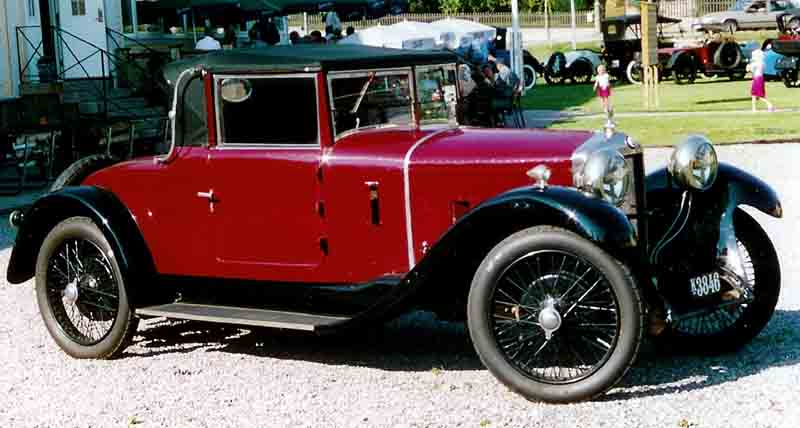
Ballot 2LTS Cabriolet (1925)

As well as racing engines, the company made a range of road engines which were fitted to their own production cars.

The first of Ballot's own road cars was the 1921 2-litre Ballot 2-litre sports tourer. In 1923 the Ballot 2 LT and a sport version, Ballot 2 LTS followed.

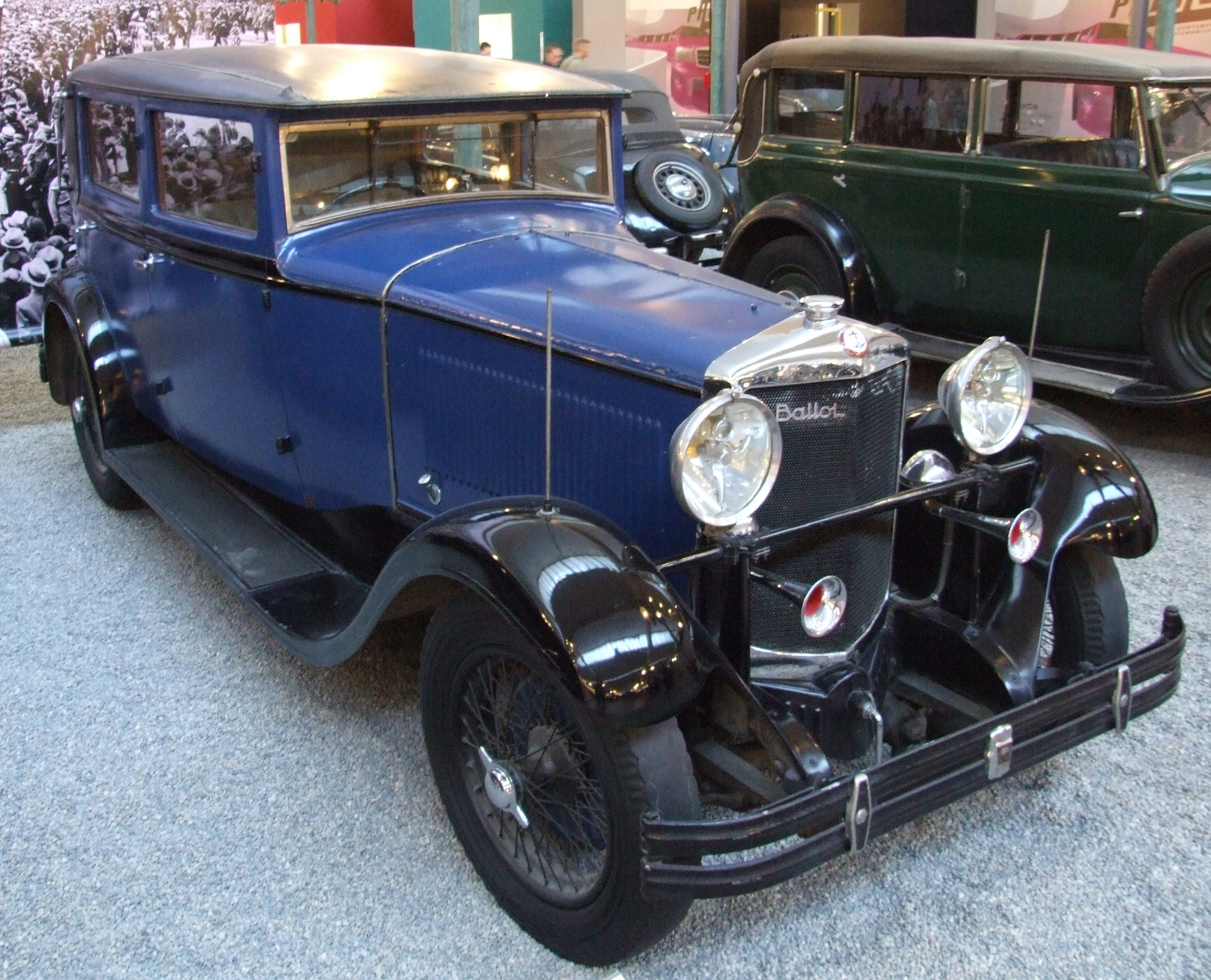
Ballot RH3 Berline (1930), Cité de l'Automobile, Mulhouse, France

By the time of the 19th Paris Motor Show in October 1924, Ballot was established in the market place as a producer of expensive road going cars with spectacular performance. The 2-litre sports tourer again appeared on the manufacturer's stand at the show. The car still used a four cylinder overhead camshaft 1,994 cc engine, and it sat on a 3,110 mm (122.4 in) wheelbase. It was priced, in bare chassis form, at 33,000 francs: Ballot also listed a "Torpedo" bodied version at 46,000 francs.

From 1927, eight-cylinder engines were used.

== Final chapter ==
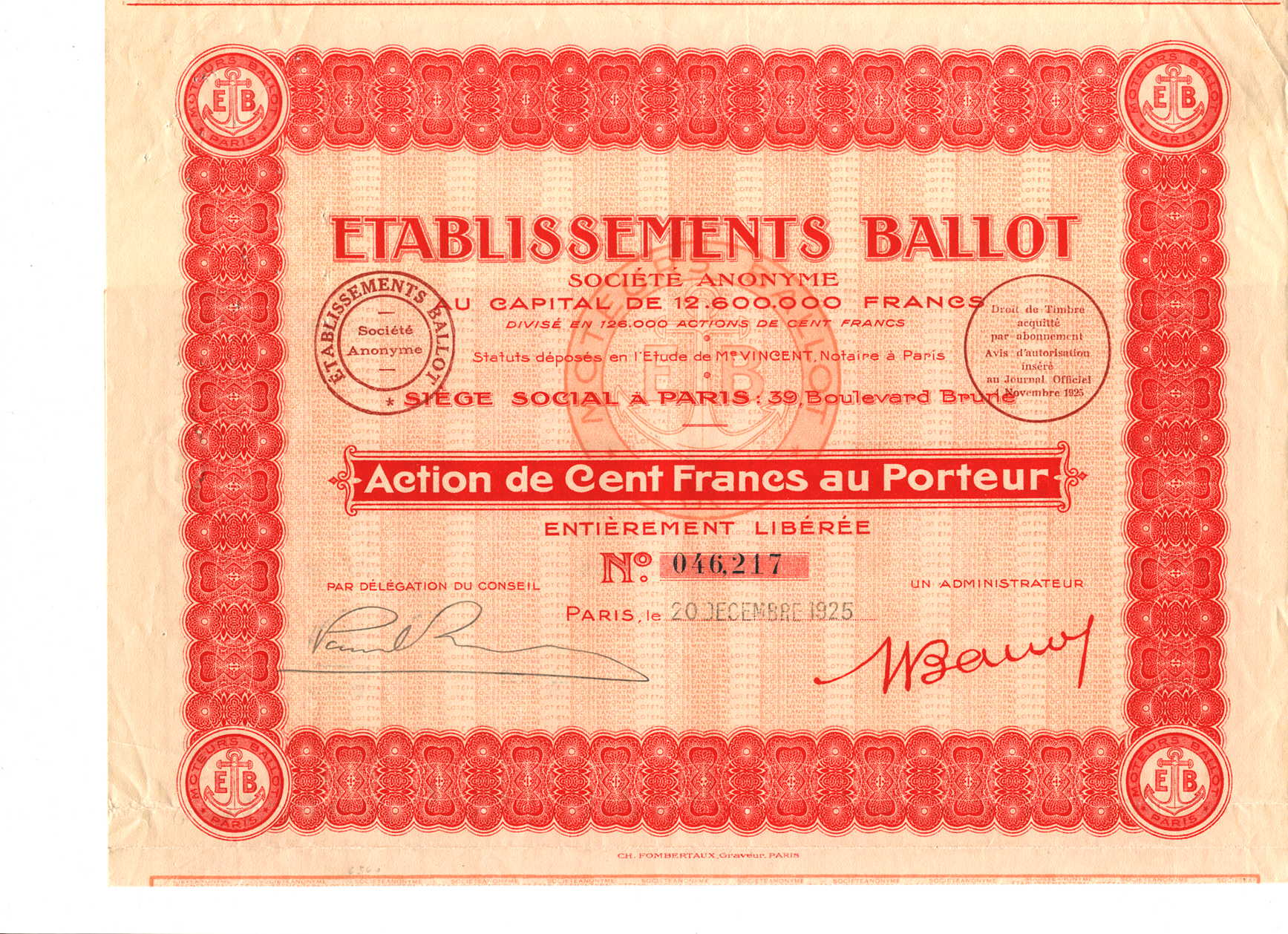
Share of the Établissements Ballot SA, issued 1925

In 1931 the company was taken over by Hispano-Suiza. Swift decline followed: the last model was practically a Hispano-Suiza, and only the chassis was provided by Ballot. Ballot closed down in 1932.

== Main models ==
- 2LS: sports car, 4-cylinder 1944 cc, twin-overhead-camshaft, 4-valves-per-cylinder engine
- 2LT: tourer, single-cam variant of the 2LS
- 2LTS: variant of the 2LT, with higher-tuned engine
- RH: introduced in 1927 with 8-cylinder, single-overhead-cam, 2874 cc engine
- RH3: 1929–1932, RH with 3049 cc engine.
- HS26: model introduced after the Hispano-Suiza takeover, also known as the Hispano-Suiza Junior, 4580 cc six-cylinder engine
