= 1970 Australian Grand Prix =

- Formula 5000, Australian Formula 1 and Australian Formula 2 race
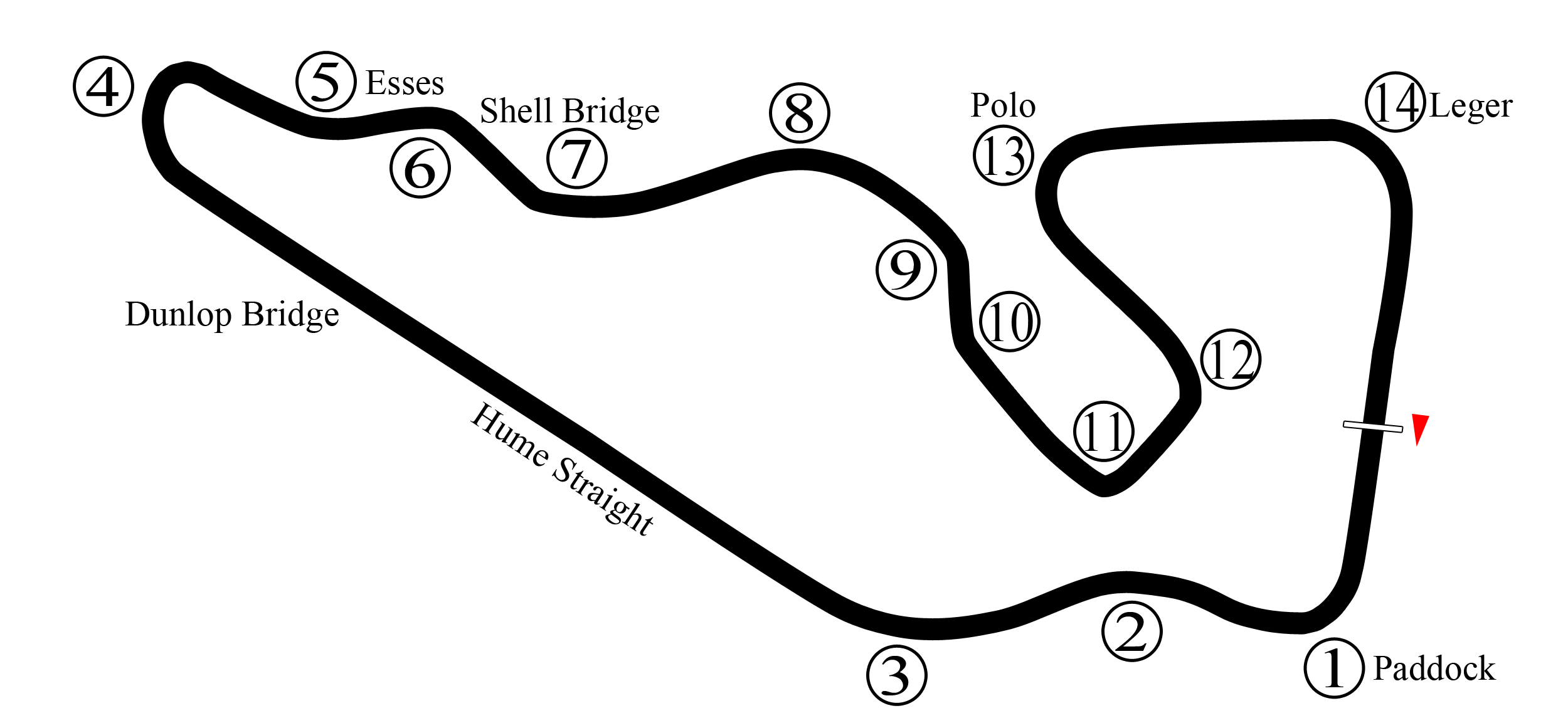

Race details
- Date: 22 November 1970
- Official name: XXXV Australian Grand Prix
- Location: Warwick Farm Raceway, Sydney, New South Wales
- Course: Permanent racing facility
- Course length: 3.621 km (2.25 miles)
- Distance: 45 laps, 162.945 km (101.25 miles)
- Weather: Sunny

Pole position
| Driver | (Australia) Frank Matich | McLaren-Repco-Holden |
- Time: 1'23.9

Fastest lap
| Driver | (Australia) Frank Matich | McLaren-Repco-Holden |
- Time: 1'24.8

Podium
| First | (Australia) Frank Matich | McLaren-Repco-Holden |
| Second | (Australia) Niel Allen | McLaren-Chevrolet |
| Third | (New Zealand) Graeme Lawrence | Ferrari |

The 1970 Australian Grand Prix was a motor race held at Warwick Farm Raceway in New South Wales, Australia on 22 November 1970. The race, which was the thirty fifth Australian Grand Prix, was open to Formula 5000 cars, 2.5-litre Australian Formula 1 cars and Australian Formula 2 cars. The race was promoted by the Australian Automobile Racing Co. Ltd. For the first time since 1956, the race was not a round of either the Australian Drivers' Championship or the Tasman Series.

Frank Matich started from pole position, won the race, his first Australian Grand Prix victory, and set the fastest race lap.

== Classification ==
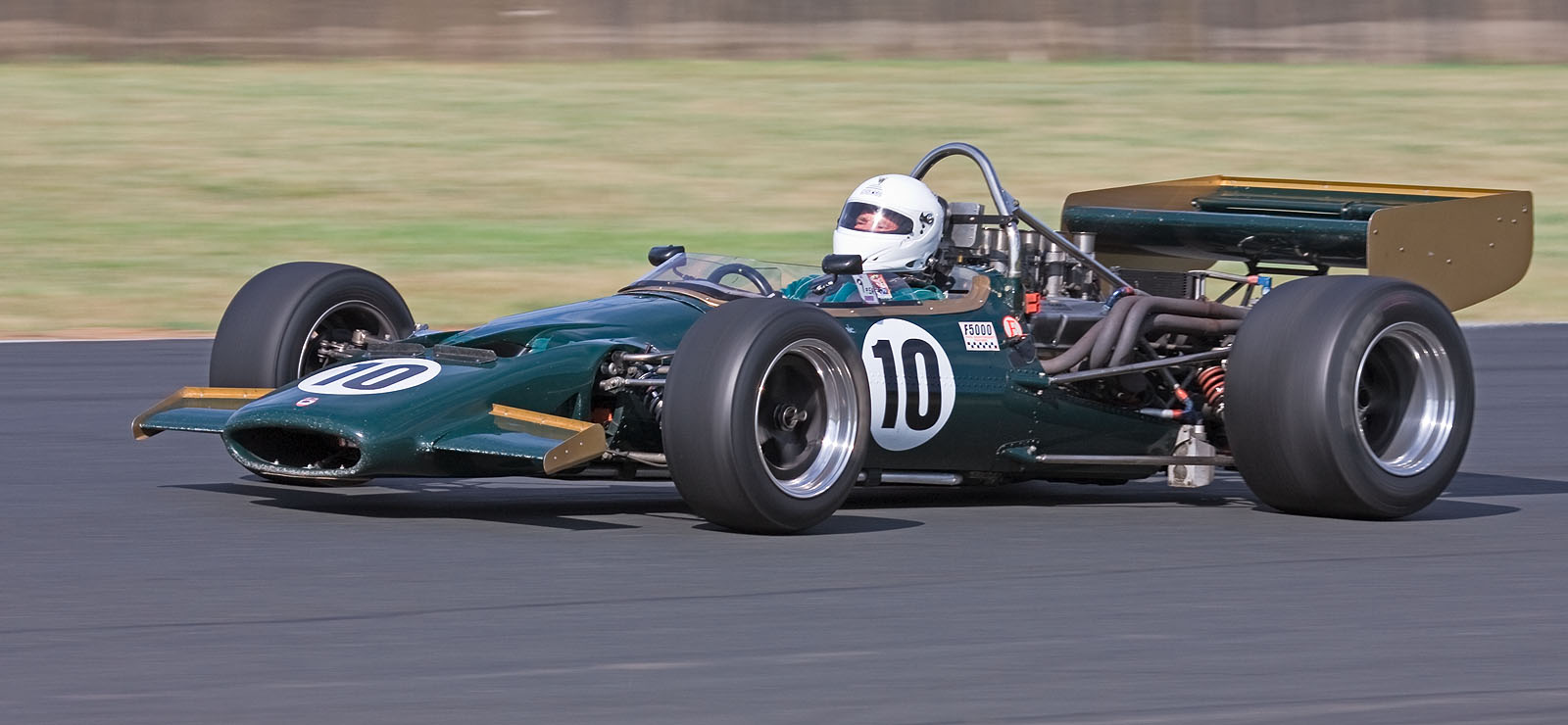
Frank Matich won the race driving a McLaren M10B, similar to the car pictured above

Results as follows:

=== Qualifying ===
| Pos | No | Driver | Car | Qual | Gap |
|---|---|---|---|---|---|
| 1 | 10 | (Australia) Frank Matich | McLaren M10B / Repco-Holden 5.0L V8 | 1:23.9 | — |
| 2 | 4 | (New Zealand) Graeme Lawrence | Ferrari Dino 246T/69 / Ferrari 2.4L V6 | 1:24.4 | +0.5 |
| 3 | 1 | (Australia) Leo Geoghegan | Lotus 59 / Waggott TC4V 2.0L I4 | 1:25.2 | +1.3 |
| 4 | 2 | (Australia) Niel Allen | McLaren M10B / Chevrolet 5.0L V8 | 1:25.5 | +1.6 |
| 5 | 5 | (Australia) Kevin Bartlett | Mildren / Chevrolet 5.0L V8 | 1:25.7 | +1.8 |
| 6 | 6 | (Australia) Max Stewart | Mildren / Waggott TC4V 2.0L I4 | 1:25.9 | +2.0 |
| 7 | 3 | (Australia) David Walker | Lotus 70 / Ford 5.0L V8 | 1:26.5 | +2.6 |
| 8 | 8 | (United Kingdom) Keith Holland | McLaren M10B / Chevrolet 5.0L V8 | 1:27.1 | +3.2 |
| 9 | 14 | (Australia) John McCormack | Elfin 600C / Repco 2.5L V8 | 1:27.9 | +4.0 |
| 10 | 12 | (Australia) Garrie Cooper | Elfin 600D / Repco 2.5L V8 | 1:28.4 | +4.5 |
| 11 | 22 | (Australia) Len Goodwin | McLaren M4A / Cosworth FVA 1.6L I4 | 1:29.0 | +5.1 |
| 12 | 9 | (Australia) Bob Muir | Mildren Mono / Waggott TC4V 2.0L I4 | 1:29.0 | +5.1 |
| 13 | 7 | (Australia) Col Green | Repco Brabham BT16 / Coventry Climax FPF 2.5L I4 | 1:30.7 | +6.8 |
| 14 | 20 | (Australia) Johnnie Walker | Elfin 600B / Ford 1.6L I4 | 1:31.0 | +7.1 |
| 15 | 23 | (Australia) Ken Goodwin | Rennmax BN3 Ford 1.6L I4 | 1:31.2 | +7.3 |
| 16 | 15 | (New Zealand) Frank Radisich | McLaren M10A / Chevrolet 5.0L V8 | 1:31.2 | +7.3 |
| 17 | 18 | (Australia) Clive Mills | Elfin 600B / Ford 1.6L I4 | 1:31.4 | +7.5 |
| 18 | 24 | (Australia) Jack Bono | Brabham BT6 / Ford 1.6L I4 | 1:32.4 | +8.5 |
| 19 | 17 | (Australia) Tony Stewart | Elfin 600B / Ford 1.6L I4 | 1:34.1 | +10.2 |
| 20 | 25 | (Australia) Ian Fergusson | Bowin P3A / Ford 1.6L I4 | 1:34.1 | +10.2 |

=== Race ===
| Pos | No. | Driver | Car | Entrant | Laps | Time | Grid |
|---|---|---|---|---|---|---|---|
| 1 | 10 | (Australia) Frank Matich | McLaren M10B / Repco-Holden 5.0L V8 | Rothman's Team Matich | 45 | 1h 04m 37.6s | 1 |
| 2 | 2 | (Australia) Niel Allen | McLaren M10B / Chevrolet 5.0L V8 | N.E. Allen (Auto Inds.) Pty. Ltd. | 45 | 1h 04m 44.7s | 4 |
| 3 | 4 | (New Zealand) Graeme Lawrence | Ferrari Dino 246T/69 / Ferrari 2.4L V6 | Air New Zealand | 45 | 1h 04m 45.2s | 2 |
| 4 | 1 | (Australia) Leo Geoghegan | Lotus 59 / Waggott TC4V 2.0L I4 | Geoghegan's Sporty Cars | 45 | 1h 04m 46.4s | 3 |
| 5 | 3 | (Australia) David Walker | Lotus 70 / Ford 5.0L V8 | Team Lotus | 43 | | 7 |
| 6 | 22 | (Australia) Len Goodwin | McLaren M4A / Cosworth FVA 1.6L I4 | Pat Burke Racing | 43 | | 11 |
| 7 | 20 | (Australia) Johnnie Walker | Elfin 600B / Ford 1.6L I4 | Gilbert Motor Bodies | 42 | | 14 |
| 8 | 17 | (Australia) Tony Stewart | Elfin 600B / Ford 1.6L I4 | Paul England P./L. | 42 | | 19 |
| 9 | 24 | (Australia) Jack Bono | Brabham BT6 / Ford 1.6L I4 | Graham Collier | 42 | | 18 |
| 10 | 6 | (Australia) Max Stewart | Mildren / Waggott TC4V 2.0L I4 | Alec Mildren Racing P./L. | 42 | | 6 |
| 11 | 25 | (Australia) Ian Fergusson | Bowin P3A / Ford 1.6L I4 | Ian Fergusson | 41 | | 20 |
| 12 | 15 | (New Zealand) Frank Radisich | McLaren M10A / Chevrolet 5.0L V8 | Frank Radisich | 38 | | 16 |
| 13 | 7 | (Australia) Col Green | Repco Brabham BT16 / Coventry Climax FPF 2.5L I4 | Col Green | 32 | | 13 |
| Ret | 23 | (Australia) Ken Goodwin | Rennmax BN3 / Ford 1.6L I4 | Peter Clark Surfboards P./L. | 39 | fuel regulator | 15 |
| Ret | 18 | (Australia) Clive Mills | Elfin 600B / Ford 1.6L I4 | Clive Millis Motors P./L. | 35 | out of fuel | 17 |
| Ret | 12 | (Australia) Garrie Cooper | Elfin 600D / Repco 2.5L V8 | Elfin G. T. Harrison Racing Team | 21 | fuel pump | 10 |
| Ret | 5 | (Australia) Kevin Bartlett | Mildren / Chevrolet 5.0L V8 | Alec Mildren Racing | 21 | electrics | 5 |
| Ret | 9 | (Australia) Bob Muir | Mildren Mono / Waggott TC4V 2.0L I4 | Robert Muir Motors P./L. | 14 | accident | 12 |
| Ret | 8 | (United Kingdom) Keith Holland | McLaren M10B / Chevrolet 5.0L V8 | Keith Holland Racing | 9 | oil pump | 8 |
| DNS | 14 | (Australia) John McCormack | Elfin 600C / Repco 2.5L V8 | John McCormack | - | Engine (withdrawn) | 9 |

== Notes ==
- Attendance: 15,953
- Pole position: Frank Matich - 1'23.9
- Fastest lap: Frank Matich - 1'24.8

| Preceded by 1969 Australian Grand Prix | Australian Grand Prix; 1970 | Succeeded by 1971 Australian Grand Prix |
