= 1972 Australian Grand Prix =

- Race 7 of 8 in 1972 Tasman Series

Race details
- Date: 20 February 1972
- Official name: XXXVII Australian Grand Prix
- Location: Sandown Raceway, Melbourne, Victoria
- Course: Permanent racing facility
- Course length: 3.1 km (1.92 miles)
- Distance: 52 laps, 161.2 km (99.84 miles)
- Weather: Sunny

Pole position
Driver	(Australia) Frank Matich	Matich-Repco Holden
- Time: 1'01.3

Fastest lap
Driver	(New Zealand) Graham McRae	Leda-Chevrolet
- Time: 1'02.4

Podium
First	(New Zealand) Graham McRae	Leda-Chevrolet
Second	(Australia) Frank Gardner	Lola-Chevrolet
Third	(United Kingdom) David Hobbs	McLaren-Chevrolet

The 1972 Australian Grand Prix was a motor race for cars complying with the Tasman Formula, which admitted both Formula 5000 and 2-litre racing cars. It was held at Sandown International Raceway, Victoria, Australia on 20 February 1972.

The race was the thirty seventh Australian Grand Prix and it was held only 3 months after the 1971 race. It was also round seven of the 1972 Tasman Series. The race had 19 starters.

Defending winner Frank Matich started the race from pole position in his Repco Holden powered Matich A50 which had won the 1971 race on debut. New Zealand's Graham McRae started alongside Matich on the front row in his Leda GM1-Chevrolet.

Matich led from the start but was out after just 5 laps with a failed scavenge pump. McRae recorded the first of three AGP wins (all won at Sandown) by 3 seconds from the Lola T300-Chevrolet of Frank Gardner who had qualified 3rd. British International driver David Hobbs finished 3rd in his McLaren M18/M22-Chevrolet after starting from 4th on the grid.

McRae's win gave him an unassailable points lead in the 1972 Tasman Series with one round remaining.

== Classification ==
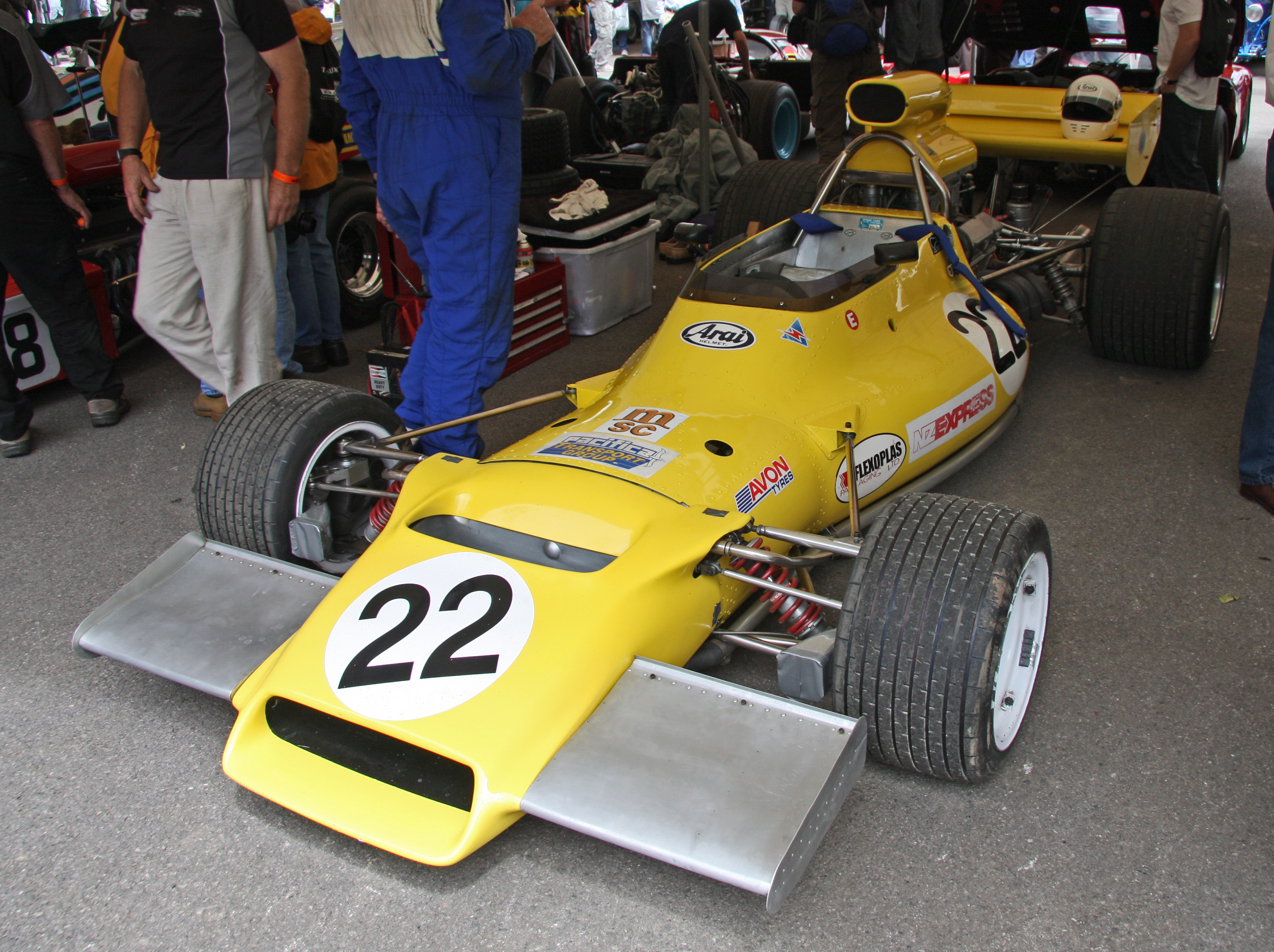
Graham McRae won the race driving a Leda GM1, later to be known as the McRae GM1 (pictured above in 2008)

Results as follows:

=== Qualifying ===
Pos	No	Driver	Car	Entrant	Qual	Gap
1	3	(Australia) Frank Matich	Matich A50 / Repco Holden 5.0L V8	Frank Matich Pty. Ltd.	1:01.3	—
2	22	(New Zealand) Graham McRae	Leda GM1 / Chevrolet 5.0L V8	Grid International (N.Z.) Ltd.	1:01.8	+0.5
3	1	(Australia) Frank Gardner	Lola T300 / Chevrolet 5.0L V8	Lola Cars Ltd.	1:01.8	+0.5
4	10	(United Kingdom) David Hobbs	McLaren M22 / Chevrolet 5.0L V8	Hobbs Racing London	1:02.3	+1.0
5	4	(Australia) Bob Muir	Lola T300 / Chevrolet 5.0L V8	Robert Muir Motors P/L	1:02.7	+1.4
6	9	(Australia) John McCormack	Elfin MR5 / Repco Holden 5.0L V8	Team Elfin	1:02.8	+1.5
7	2	(United Kingdom) Mike Hailwood	Surtees TS8A / Chevrolet 5.0L V8	Team Surtees	1:03.0	+1.7
8	34	(Belgium) Teddy Pilette	McLaren M10B / Chevrolet 5.0L V8	Racing Team V.D.S.	1:03.2	+1.9
9	5	(Australia) Kevin Bartlett	McLaren M10B / Chevrolet 5.0L V8	Kevin Bartlett Shell Racing	1:03.5	+2.2
10	12	(Australia) Warwick Brown	McLaren M10B / Chevrolet 5.0L V8	Pat Burke Racing	1:03.9	+2.6
11	6	(Australia) Max Stewart	Elfin MR5 / Repco Holden 5.0L V8	Max Stewart Motors - Seiko Service Centre	1:04.4	+3.1
12	76	(Australia) John Harvey	Brabham BT36 / Waggott 2.0L I4	Bob Jane Racing	1:05.2	+3.9
13	8	(Australia) Garrie Cooper	Elfin MR5 / Repco Holden 5.0L V8	Team Elfin	1:05.3	+4.0
14	50	(New Zealand) Frank Radisich	McLaren M10B / Repco Holden 5.0L V8	Henderson Central Motors	1:06.5	+5.2
15	30	(Canada) Dave McConnell	GRD 272 / Hart 2.0L I4	D.W.M. Racing Ltd.	1:07.1	+5.8
16	11	(Australia) Colin Hyams	Lola T192 / Chevrolet 5.0L V8	Colin Hyams	1:08.2	+6.9
17	17	(Australia) Gary Campbell	Elfin 600B / Waggott 2.0L I4	Provincial Motors P/L	1:08.3	+7.0
18	60	(New Zealand) Robbie Francevic	McLaren M10A / Chevrolet 5.0L V8	Wright Machinery Ltd.	1:10.2	+8.9
19	15	(Australia) Tony Stewart	Mildren (Rennmax) / Waggott 1.9L I4	Max Stewart Motors - Seiko Service Centre	1:11.5	+10.2

=== Race ===
Pos	No.	Driver	Car	Entrant	Laps	Time
1	22	(New Zealand) Graham McRae	Leda GM1 / Chevrolet 5.0L V8	Grid International (N.Z.) Ltd.	52	54m 59.4s
2	1	(Australia) Frank Gardner	Lola T300 / Chevrolet 5.0L V8	Lola Cars Ltd.	52	55m 02.1s
3	10	(United Kingdom) David Hobbs	McLaren M18/M22 / Chevrolet 5.0L V8	Hobbs Racing London	52	55m 11.8s
4	2	(United Kingdom) Mike Hailwood	Surtees TS8A / Chevrolet 5.0L V8	Team Surtees	51	
5	12	(Australia) Warwick Brown	McLaren M10B / Chevrolet 5.0L V8	Pat Burke Racing	50	
6	34	(Belgium) Teddy Pilette	McLaren M10B / Chevrolet 5.0L V8	Racing Team V.D.S.	50	
7	76	(Australia) John Harvey	Brabham BT36 / Waggott 2.0L 4cyl	Bob Jane Racing	50	
8	60	(New Zealand) Robbie Francevic	McLaren M10A / Chevrolet 5.0L V8	Wright Machinery Ltd.	49	
9	8	(Australia) Garrie Cooper	Elfin MR5 / Repco Holden 5.0L V8	Team Elfin	49	
10	30	(Canada) Dave McConnell	GRD 272 / Hart 2.0L 4cyl	D.W.M. Racing Ltd.	49	
11	17	(Australia) Gary Campbell	Elfin 600B / Waggott 2.0L 4cyl	Provincial Motors P/L	47	
12	15	(Australia) Tony Stewart	Mildren (Rennmax) / Waggott 1.9L 4cyl	Max Stewart Motors - Seiko Service Centre	44	
13	50	(New Zealand) Frank Radisich	McLaren M10B / Repco Holden 5.0L V8	Henderson Central Motors	26	
Ret	11	(Australia) Colin Hyams	Lola T192 / Chevrolet 5.0L V8	Colin Hyams	30	
Ret	4	(Australia) Bob Muir	Lola T300 / Chevrolet 5.0L V8	Robert Muir Motors P/L	19	engine
Ret	6	(Australia) Max Stewart	Elfin MR5 / Repco Holden 5.0L V8	Max Stewart Motors - Seiko Service Centre	16	engine
Ret	5	(Australia) Kevin Bartlett	McLaren M10B / Chevrolet 5.0L V8	Kevin Bartlett Shell Racing	6	transmission
Ret	3	(Australia) Frank Matich	Matich A50 / Repco Holden 5.0L V8	Frank Matich Pty. Ltd.	5	scavenge pump
Ret	9	(Australia) John McCormack	Elfin MR5 / Repco Holden 5.0L V8	Team Elfin	4	gearbox

== Notes ==
- Attendance: 30,000
- Pole position: Frank Matich – 1:01.3
- Fastest lap: Graham McRae – 1:02.4 (111.23 mph) – New outright lap record

Preceded by 1971 Australian Grand Prix	Australian Grand Prix; 1972	Succeeded by 1973 Australian Grand Prix
