= 1971 Australian Grand Prix =

- Australian Formula 1 & Australian Formula 2 race
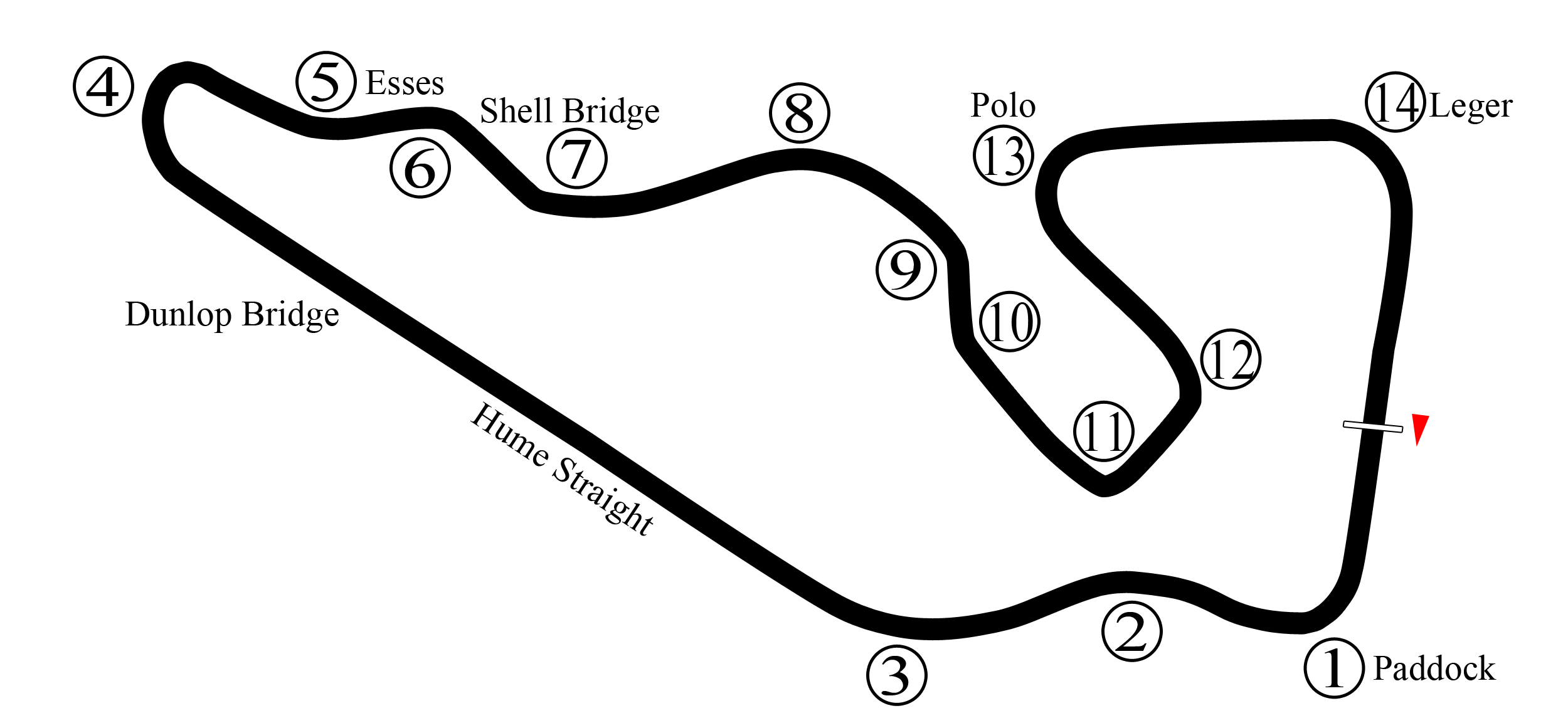

Race details
- Date: 21 November 1971
- Official name: XXXVI Australian Grand Prix
- Location: Warwick Farm Raceway, Sydney, New South Wales
- Course: Permanent racing facility
- Course length: 3.621 km (2.25 miles)
- Distance: 45 laps, 162.945 km (101.25 miles)
- Weather: Fine, mild

Pole position
Driver	(Australia) Frank Matich	Matich-Repco Holden
- Time: 1'24.3

Fastest lap
Driver	(Australia) Frank Matich	Matich-Repco Holden
- Time: 1'24.6

Podium
First	(Australia) Frank Matich	Matich-Repco Holden
Second	(Australia) Kevin Bartlett	McLaren-Chevrolet
Third	(Australia) Alan Hamilton	McLaren-Chevrolet

The 1971 Australian Grand Prix was a motor race held at Warwick Farm Raceway in New South Wales, Australia on 21 November 1971. It was open to Racing Cars complying with either Australian Formula 1 or Australian Formula 2 regulations.

The race was the thirty sixth running of the Australian Grand Prix. Frank Matich won his second straight AGP and, as in 1970, he started the race on pole and also set the fastest race lap. The race marked the debut of Matich's self designed and built Matich A50 which was powered by a Repco Holden V8 engine. Matich won the race by 58.7 seconds from Kevin Bartlett driving a McLaren M10B-Chevrolet, with Alan Hamilton, also driving McLaren M10B-Chevrolet, 1.1 seconds behind Bartlett in third place.

Other than two New Zealanders, the only international driver in the event was 1964 Formula One World Drivers' Champion John Surtees. The Englishman started ninth in his Surtees TS8-Chevrolet, and battled with Bartlett, Hamilton, and, until his retirement, Colin Bond in the McLaren M10B in which Matich had won the 1970 Australian Grand Prix. Surtees ultimately placed 14th after suffering two punctures late in the race. 1971 Rothmans F5000 European Championship winner Frank Gardner was unable to start the race after damaging his Lola T300 in the first practice session on the Saturday.

== Classification ==
Results as follows:

=== Official practice ===
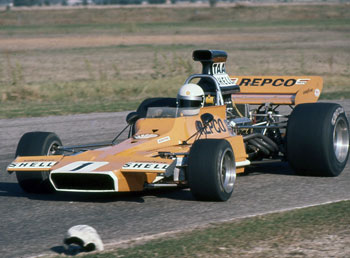
Frank Matich won the race driving a Matich A50 similar to the above

Grid positions for the race were determined during "official practice".

Pos	No	Driver	Car/Engine	Time	Gap
1	1	(Australia) Frank Matich	Matich A50 / Repco Holden 5.0L V8	1:24.3	—
2	8	(Australia) Bob Muir	Mildren Mono / Waggott TC 4V 2.0L I4	1:25.4	+0.9
3	7	(Australia) John Harvey	Brabham BT36 / Waggott TC 4V 2.0L I4	1:25.6	+1.3
4	6	(Australia) Max Stewart	Mildren / Waggott TC 4V 2.0L I4	1:25.8	+1.5
5	14	(New Zealand) Graeme Lawrence	Brabham BT30 / Cosworth FVC 1.8L I4	1:26.0	+1.7
6	9	(Australia) Alan Hamilton	McLaren M10B / Chevrolet 5.0L V8	1:26.3	+2.0
7	2	(Australia) Colin Bond	McLaren M10B / Repco Holden 5.0L V8	1:26.4	+2.1
8	5	(Australia) Kevin Bartlett	McLaren M10B / Chevrolet 5.0L V8	1:26.8	+2.5
9	3	(United Kingdom) John Surtees	Surtees TS8 / Chevrolet 5.0L V8	1:27.2	+2.9
10	11	(Australia) John McCormack	Elfin MR5 / Repco Holden 5.0L V8	1:27.6	+3.3
11	12	(Australia) Warwick Brown	McLaren M4A / Cosworth FVC 1.9L I4	1:29.3	+5.0
12	26	(Australia) Jack Bono	Elfin 600B / Ford T/C 1.6L I4 (AF2)	1:29.7	+5.4
13	15	(Australia) Don O'Sullivan	McLaren M18 / Repco Holden 5.0L V8	1:29.7	+5.4
14	17	(Australia) Gary Campbell	Elfin 600B / Ford T/C 1.6L I4 (AF2)	1:30.1	+5.8
15	20	(Australia) Alfredo Costanzo	Elfin AC1 / Ford T/C 1.6L I4 (AF2)	1:30.1	+5.8
16	16	(New Zealand) Henk Woelders	Elfin 600C / Waggott T/C 1.6L I4 (AF2)	1:31.2	+6.9
17	10	(Australia) Colin Hyams	Lola T192 / Chevrolet 5.0L V8	1:31.4	+7.1
18	19	(Australia) Terry Quartly	Lotus 32B / Ford T/C 1.6L I4 (AF2)	1:31.8	+7.5
19	25	(Australia) Ian Fergusson	Bowin P3A / Ford T/C 1.6L I4 (AF2)	1:33.0	+8.7
20	21	(New Zealand) Ian Cook	Devione LC2 / Ford T/C 1.6L I4 (AF2)	1:33.8	+9.5
21	24	(Australia) Ross Ambrose	Elfin 600B / Ford T/C 1.6L I4 (AF2)	1:34.2	+9.9
22	18	(Australia) Clive Mills	Elfin 600B / Ford T/C 1.6L I4 (AF2)	1:34.8	+10.5
23	23	(Australia) Chris Farrell	Brabham BT6 / BRM Ford T/C 1.6L 4cyl (AF2)	DNP	
–	4	(Australia) Frank Gardner	Lola T300 / Chevrolet 5.0L V8	DNP	–

=== Race ===
Pos	No.	Driver	Car	Entrant	Laps	Time / Reason
1	1	(Australia) Frank Matich	Matich A50 / Repco Holden 5.0L V8	Rothmans Team Matich	45	1h 05m 09.5s
2	5	(Australia) Kevin Bartlett	McLaren M10B / Chevrolet 5.0L V8	Kevin Bartlett Shell Racing	45	1h 06m 08.2s
3	9	(Australia) Alan Hamilton	McLaren M10B / Chevrolet 5.0L V8	Porsche Distributors Racing Pty Ltd	45	1h 06m 09.3s
4	14	(New Zealand) Graeme Lawrence	Brabham BT30 / Cosworth FVC 1.8L 4cyl	Air New Zealand	45	1h 06m 09.7s
5	6	(Australia) Max Stewart	Mildren / Waggott TC 4V 2.0L 4cyl	Max Stewart Motors – Waggott Engineering	45	1h 06m 10.2s
6	11	(Australia) John McCormack	Elfin MR5 / Repco Holden 5.0L V8	Elfin Sports Cars	44	
7	12	(Australia) Warwick Brown	McLaren M4A / Cosworth FVC 1.9L 4cyl	Pat Burke Racing	43	
8	17	(Australia) Gary Campbell	Elfin 600B / Ford T/C 1.6L 4cyl (AF2)	Provincial Motors	43	
9	16	(Australia) Henk Woelders	Elfin 600C / Waggott T/C 1.6L 4cyl (AF2)	Bill Patterson Racing	43	
10	26	(Australia) Jack Bono	Elfin 600B / Ford T/C 1.6L 4cyl (AF2)	Graham Collier	43	
11	25	(Australia) Ian Fergusson	Bowin P3A / Ford T/C 1.6L 4cyl (AF2)	Ian Ferguson	42	
12	21	(New Zealand) Ian Cook	Devione LC2 / Ford T/C 1.6L 4cyl (AF2)	Autocorse	42	
13	18	(Australia) Clive Mills	Elfin 600B / Ford T/C 1.6L 4cyl (AF2)	Clive Millis Motors Pty Ltd	41	
14	3	(United Kingdom) John Surtees	Surtees TS8 / Chevrolet 5.0L V8	Team Surtees	38	
15	18	(Australia) Terry Quartly	Lotus 32 / Ford T/C 1.6L 4cyl (AF2)	Jeff Noblett	38	
Ret	7	(Australia) John Harvey	Brabham BT36 / Waggott TC 4V 2.0L 4cyl	Bob Jane Racing	23	Exhaust
Ret	15	(Australia) Don O'Sullivan	McLaren M18 / Repco Holden 5.0L V8	Don O'Sullivan Racing Pty Ltd	21	Crash
Ret	2	(Australia) Colin Bond	McLaren M10B / Repco Holden 5.0L V8	Rothmans Team Matich	20	Oil pressure
Ret	20	(Australia) Alfredo Costanzo	Elfin AC1 / Ford T/C 1.6L 4cyl (AF2)	Alfredo Costanzo		Engine
Ret	10	(Australia) Colin Hyams	Lola T192 / Chevrolet 5.0L V8	Colin Hyams		Wheels
Ret	24	(Australia) Ross Ambrose	Elfin 600B / Ford T/C 1.6L 4cyl (AF2)	Ross Ambrose		
Ret	23	(Australia) Chris Farrell	Brabham BT6 / BRM Ford T/C 1.6L 4cyl (AF2)	BP Cordon Service Station		Oil pressure
Ret	8	(Australia) Bob Muir	Mildren Mono / Waggott TC 4V 2.0L I4	Robert Muir Motors Pty Ltd	0	Bent valve
DNS	4	(Australia) Frank Gardner	Lola T300 / Chevrolet 5.0L V8	Amalgamated Scooters – Team Lola	–	Practice accident

- (AF2) indicates Australian Formula 2 car

== Notes ==
- Pole position: Frank Matich – 1'24.3
- Starters: 23
- Finishers: 15
- Winner's average speed: 93.32 m.p.h.
- Australian Formula 2 Class winner: Gary Campbell
- Fastest lap: Frank Matich – 1'24.6 (94.75 mph / 154.08 km/h) (New outright lap record)

Preceded by 1970 Australian Grand Prix	Australian Grand Prix; 1971	Succeeded by 1972 Australian Grand Prix
