= 1937 Australian Grand Prix =

1936 Australian Grand Prix
- handicap race

Race details
- Date: 26 December 1936
- Location: Port Elliot-Victor Harbor Circuit near Victor Harbor, South Australia
- Course: Temporary road circuit
- Course length: 12.55 km (7.8 miles)
- Distance: 32 laps, 386.16 km (240 . miles)
- Weather: Sunny

Fastest lap
Driver	(Australia) Tom Peters	Bugatti
- Time: 5:47

Podium
First	(Australia) Les Murphy	MG
Second	(Australia) Tim Joshua	MG
Third	(Australia) Bob Lea-Wright	Terraplane Special

The 1937 Australian Grand Prix is a name which has been applied retrospectively to the 1936 South Australian Centenary Grand Prix, a motor race held on the Port Elliot-Victor Harbor road circuit in South Australia on Boxing Day, 26 December 1936.

The 1935 Australian Grand Prix had been held at Phillip Island in April and no succeeding event had been planned. Eventually the Australian Grand Prix would be revived in April 1938 at Bathurst. The stature of 1936 South Australian Centenary Grand Prix, the largest such race held in the three-year gap, saw it later renamed and redated to become the 1937 Australian Grand Prix.

The race was the first road race for cars to be held in South Australia, with special amendments to the Road Traffic Act required to allow the roads to be closed for that purpose. A 7.8-mile (12.55 km) course was laid out specifically for the race on sealed public roads between the seaside towns of Port Elliot and Victor Harbor. It was only used for racing on this one occasion. The race, which had 27 starters, was held over 32 laps for a total distance of approximately 250 miles (400 kilometres). Like most major Australian motor races of the period, it featured a handicap start, with the slowest cars starting first and other cars starting at timed intervals according to their predicted performance. The race was organised by the Sporting Car Club of South Australia and promoted by Centenary Road Races Limited of Adelaide. It was open to factory built and catalogued racing cars and sports cars, irrespective of engine capacity, however other entries not meeting that description were also considered.

The race was won by pre-race favourite Les Murphy, driving a MG P-type off a handicap of 40 minutes. He finished over ten minutes clear of Tim Joshua driving a similar car with Bob Lea-Wright third in a Terraplane-based special. Fifth placed finisher Ossie Cranston, driving a Ford V8-based special off a handicap of 5 minutes, completed the race in the fastest actual running time of 3 hours 20 minutes and 17 seconds.

== Classification ==
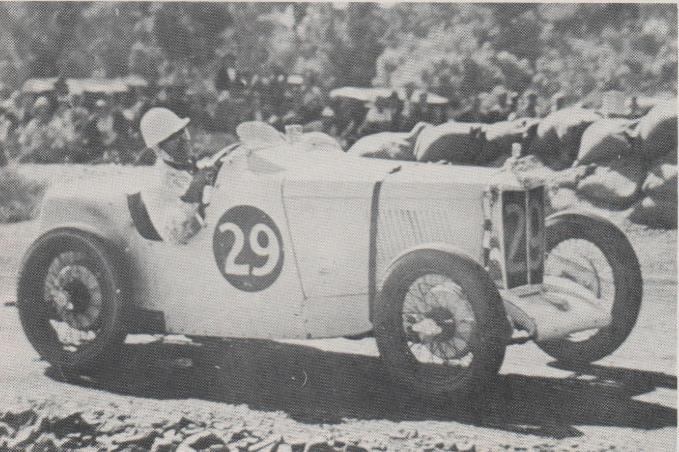
Winner Les Murphy (MG P-type), pictured during the race.

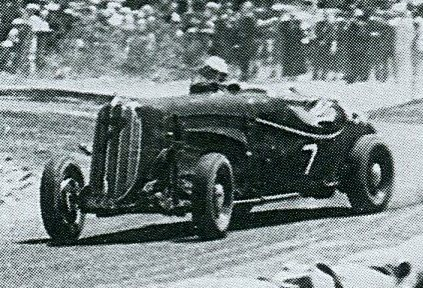
The Hudson Special driven by of Frank Kleinig retired from the race after five laps.

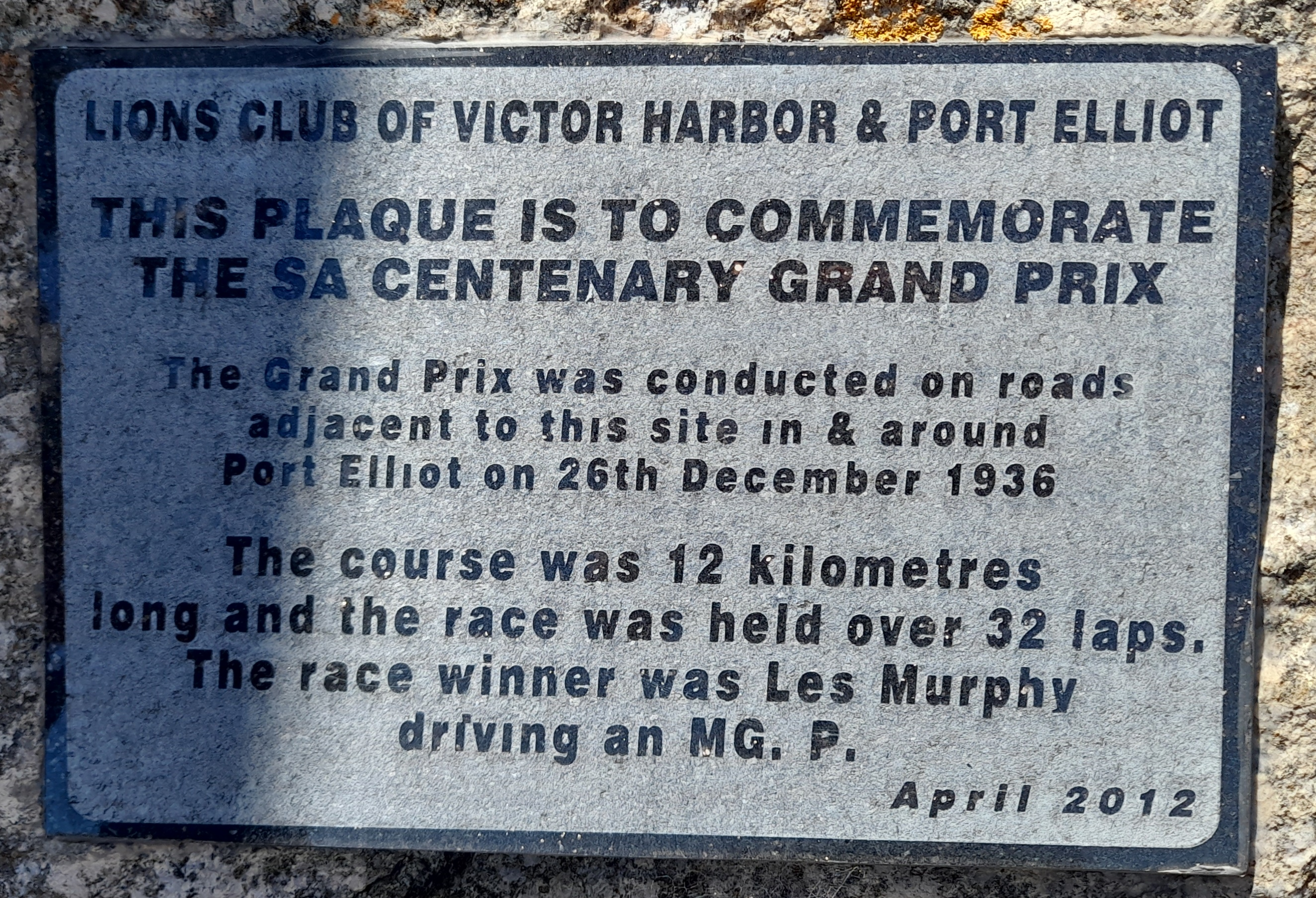
1936 South Australian Centenary Grand Prix plaque, located at Lions Information Bay, Adelaide Road, Victor Harbor, South Australia.

Results as follows.

Pos	No.	Driver	Car / Engine	Entrant	Laps	Time
1	29	(Australia) Les Murphy	MG P-type / MG 0.8L	L. Murphy	32	3h 57m 36s
2	32	(Australia) Tim Joshua	MG P-type / MG 0.8L	A. I. Barrett	32	4h 7m 40s
3	19	(Australia) Bob Lea-Wright	Terraplane Special / Terraplane 3.5L	R. A. Lea-Wright	32	4h 9m 20s
4	20	(Australia) Alec Poole	Oldsmobile Special / Oldsmobile	A. E. Poole	32	4h 10m 29s
5	15	(Australia) Barney Dentry	Riley Special / Riley 1.1L	G. B. Dentry	32	4h 12m 32s
6	6	(Australia) Ossie Cranston	Ford V8 Special / Ford 3.6L	O. S. Cranston	32	4h 15m 47s
7	35	(Australia) Ron Uffindell	Austin 7 Special / Austin 0.7L	R. S. Uffindell	32	4h 19m 19s
8	27	(Australia) John Summers	MG L Magna / MG 1.1L	J. Summers	32	4h 22m 18s
9	18	(Australia) Harry Beith	Terraplane Special / Terraplane 3.5L	H. J. Beith	32	4h 24m 01s
10	23	(Australia) John Dutton	MG C / MG 0.8L	J. H. Dutton	32	4h 24m 03s
11	9	(Australia) Arthur Terdich	Bugatti Type 37A / Bugatti s/c 1.5L	A. J. Terdich	32	4h 26m 15s
12	26	(Australia) George Martin	AC 16/80 / AC 2.0L	R. H. Wilkinson	32	4h 30m 43s
Ret	4	(Australia) Lyster Jackson	MG K3 / MG s/c 1.1L	L. Jackson	29	
NC	33	(Australia) Jack McDonald	Amilcar	J. McDonald	28	
Ret	22	(Australia) Alf Barrett	Lombard AL3 / Lombard 1.2L	A. I. Barrett	25	
NC	31	(Australia) Colin Anderson	Morris Cowley Special / Morris 1.5L	A. I. Barrett	23	
Ret	17	(Australia) Jack Phillips	Ford V8 Special / Ford 3.6L	J. K. Phillips	21	
Ret	3	(United Kingdom) Lord William Waleran	MG K3 / MG s/c 1.1L	J. Snow	20	
Ret	30	(Australia) Jim Gullan	Wolseley Hornet / Wolseley 1.3L	J. Gullan	17	
NC	25	(Australia) Henry Abbott	Austin 7 / Austin s/c 0.7L	H. Abbott	11	
Ret	1	(Australia) Jim Fagan	MG K3 / MG s/c 1.1L	J. H. Fagan	10	
Ret	34	(Australia) Eric Winter	Vauxhall 14/40 Special / Vauxhall 2.3L	E. M. Winter	10	
Ret	21	(Australia) Hylton Dale	Bugatti Type 37A / Bugatti s/c 1.5L	Hylton Dale	9	
Ret	2	(Australia) Tom Peters	Bugatti Type 37A / Bugatti s/c 1.5L	T. M. Peters	7	
Ret	12	(New Zealand) George Smith	Austin 7 Special / Austin	G. C. Smith	7	
Ret	12A	(Australia) Les Burrows	Hudson Special / Hudson	L. Burrows	7	
Ret	7	(Australia) Frank Kleinig	Hudson Special/ Hudson	W. A. McIntyre	5	
DNS	14	(Australia) Bill Bullen	Alvis / Alvis s/c 1.5L	B. McN. Clark	-	
DNS	10	(New Zealand) C. Nagrom	Miller	C. Nagrom	-	
DNS	10	(New Zealand) George Martin	Alfa Romeo 1750 Sports	G. C. Martin	-	

The entries of McDonald, Anderson and Abbott were "flagged off", having exceeded the time limit rule.

== Notes ==
Winner's average speed: 68.5 miles per hour (110.2 km/h)

Preceded by 1935 Australian Grand Prix	Australian Grand Prix; 1937	Succeeded by 1938 Australian Grand Prix
