= 1956 Australian Grand Prix =

- Formula Libre race

Race details
- Date: 2 December 1956
- Location: Albert Park, Melbourne, Victoria
- Course: Temporary street circuit
- Course length: 5.03 km (3.125 miles)
- Distance: 80 laps, 402.25 km (250 miles)
- Weather: Sunny

Pole position
Driver	(United Kingdom) Stirling Moss	Officine Alfieri Maserati

Fastest lap
Driver	(United Kingdom) Stirling Moss	Officine Alfieri Maserati
- Time: 1'52.2

Podium
First	(United Kingdom) Stirling Moss	Officine Alfieri Maserati
Second	(France) Jean Behra	Officine Alfieri Maserati
Third	(United Kingdom) Peter Whitehead	Scuderia Ambrosiana

The 1956 Australian Grand Prix was a motor race for Formula Libre cars held at Albert Park Street Circuit, in Victoria, Australia on 2 December 1956. The race, which had 22 starters, was held over 80 laps of the five kilometre circuit, the longest of all the Australian Grands Prix at 402 kilometres. It attracted a crowd of over 120,000 spectators.

The race was the twenty first Australian Grand Prix and the second to be held on a street circuit situated around the Albert Park Lake, the current location of the race. It had been moved to the end of the year, and the rotational system which shifted the race from state to state was suspended to allow the AGP to capitalise on the publicity generated around the 1956 Olympic Games which were being held in Melbourne. With the presence of the works Officine Alfieri Maserati racing team, bringing with them Stirling Moss, Jean Behra and a fleet of 250F, and fellow European based racers Ken Wharton, Peter Whitehead and Reg Parnell, the race became the most important motor racing event held in Australia's history to that point.

Moss and Behra dominated the two-week festival which began the previous weekend with the Australian Tourist Trophy sports car race in which the duo placed first and second, each driving a Maserati 300S. In the Grand Prix the two were again dominant, but Moss was a class above Behra coming close to lapping his teammate. The two Scuderia Ambrosiana entered Ferraris of Peter Whitehead and Reg Parnell were not a serious threat but Whitehead did have the measure of the local drivers with the 1938 Australian Grand Prix winner finishing two laps clear of the first of the Australians, Maserati 250F driver Reg Hunt. Parnell finished sixth, behind another domestic Maserati 250F driven by Stan Jones. Both finished on the same lap as Hunt, while Lex Davison's older sports car engined Ferrari 625 was another two laps distant. Doug Whiteford's Talbot-Lago was the first non-Italian car home in eighth place. With defending champion Jack Brabham absent the best of the Cooper sourced machinery was Len Lukey's much modified Cooper-Bristol in ninth. Wharton's European-based Maserati 250F failed to reach the finishing line.

Moss's fastest lap of 1:52.2 (100.25 mph) was a new lap record for the Albert Park Circuit.

== Classification ==
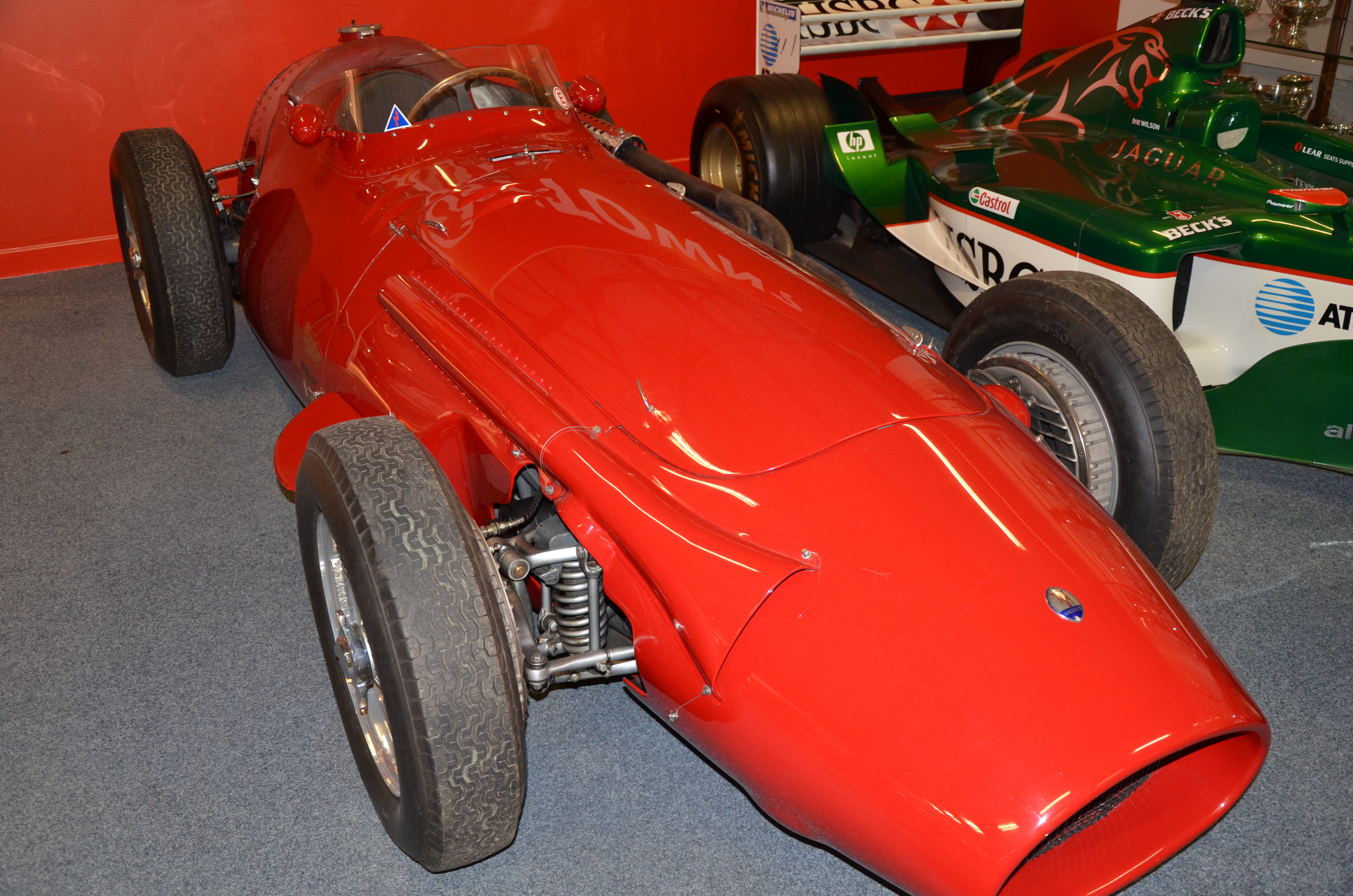
A Maserati 250F similar to that in which Stirling Moss won the 1956 Australian Grand Prix

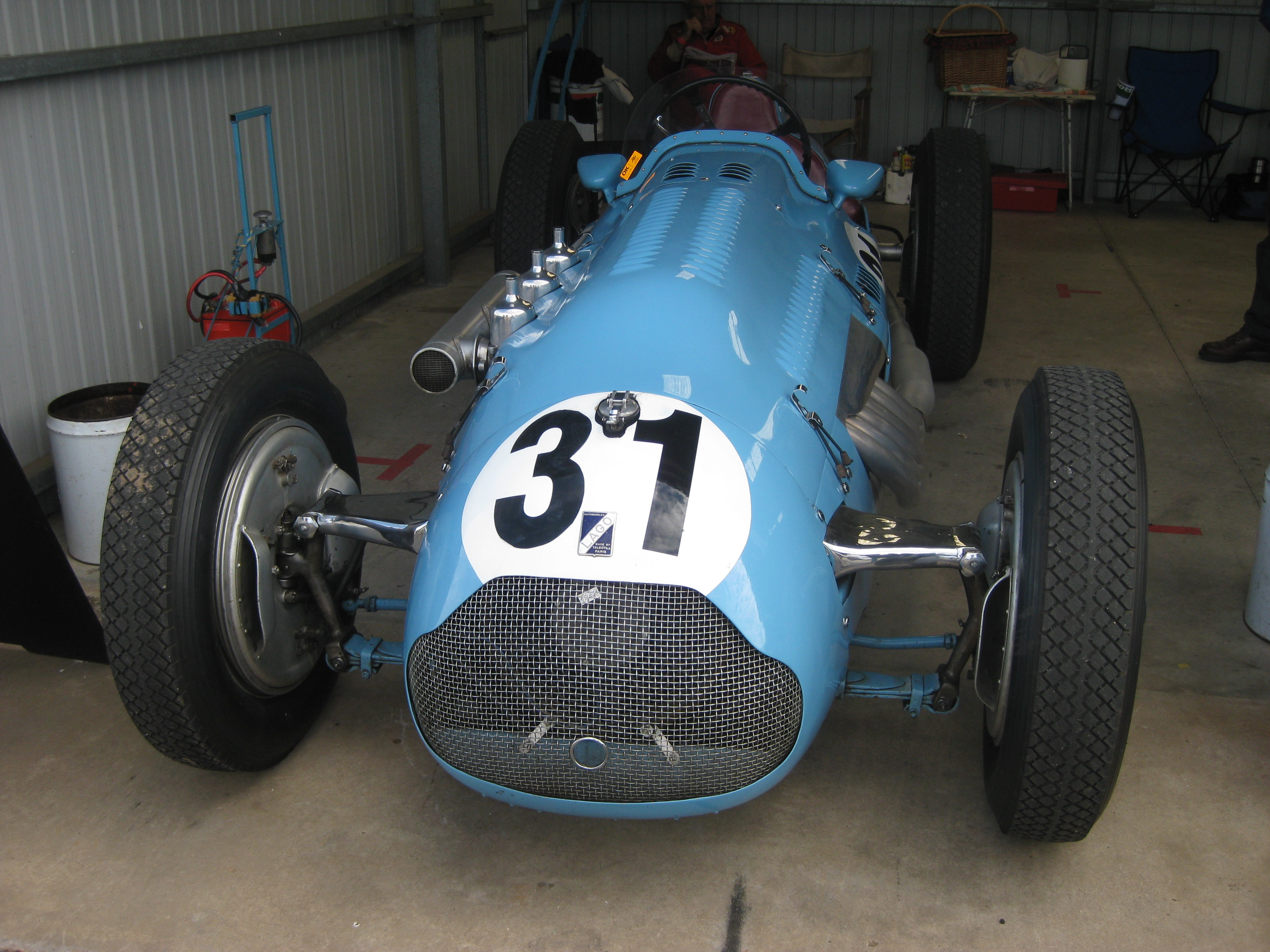
The Talbot-Lago T26C driven to 8th place by Doug Whiteford. The car is pictured in 2010

Pos	No.	Driver	Car	Entrant	Laps	Time
1	7	(United Kingdom) Stirling Moss	Maserati 250F / Maserati 2.5L	Officine Alfieri Maserati	80	2h 36m 15.4s
2	1	(France) Jean Behra	Maserati 250F / Maserati 2.5L	Officine Alfieri Maserati	80	2h 38m 27.4s
3	3	(United Kingdom) Peter Whitehead	Ferrari 555 F1 / Ferrari 3.4L	Scuderia Ambrosiana	79	
4	5	(Australia) Reg Hunt	Maserati 250F / Maserati 2.5L	Reg Hunt Motors P/L	78	
5	8	(Australia) Stan Jones	Maserati 250F / Maserati 2.5L	Stan Jones Motors P/L	77	
6	2	(United Kingdom) Reg Parnell	Ferrari 555 F1 / Ferrari 3.4L	Scuderia Ambrosiana	77	
7	9	(Australia) Lex Davison	Ferrari 625 F1 / Ferrari 3.0L	Ecurie Australie	75	
8	11	(Australia) Doug Whiteford	Talbot-Lago T26C / Talbot-Lago 4.5L	D Whiteford	72	
9	25	(Australia) Len Lukey	Cooper T23 / Bristol 2.0L	RH Hunt Motors P/L	70	
10	19	(Australia) Julian Barrett	Alta GP-2 / Alta S/C 1.5L	J St Q Barrett	70	
11	18	(New Zealand) Tom Clark	HWM / Alta 2.0L	TE Clark	66	
12	23	(Australia) Jack Myers	Cooper T20 / Holden 2.4L	J Myers	66	
Ret	6	(Australia) Kevin Neal	Maserati A6GCM / Maserati 2.5L	Reg Hunt Motors P/L	68	
Ret	20	(Australia) Bill Willcox	Alta / Alta 2.0L	W Wilcox	39	
Ret	26	(Australia) Bill Craig	Alta / Holden 2.4L	WJ Craig	26	
Ret	24	(Australia) Alec Mildren	Cooper T20 / Bristol 2.0L	AG Mildren	21	
Ret	4	(United Kingdom) Ken Wharton	Maserati 250F / Maserati 2.5L	Ecurie Du Puy	19	
Ret	16	(Australia) Ted Gray	Tornado II / Ford 4.5L	LJ Abrahams	15	
Ret	22	(Australia) Reg Smith	Cooper T40 / Bristol 2.0L	Smith's Radio P/L	13	
Ret	28	(Australia) Harry McLaughlin	Ford V8 Special 4.3L	H McLaughlan	6	
Ret	17	(Australia) Tom Hawkes	Cooper T23 / Holden 2.3L	TV Hawkes	5	
Ret	12	(Australia) Owen Bailey	Talbot-Lago T26C / Talbot-Lago 4.5L	O Bailey	0	

Preceded by 1955 Australian Grand Prix	Australian Grand Prix; 1956	Succeeded by 1957 Australian Grand Prix
