= Australian Grand Prix =

Motor race held in Australia

- Albert Park Circuit

Race information
- Number of times held: 89
- First held: 1928
- Most wins (drivers): (Australia) Lex Davison (4) (Germany) Michael Schumacher (4)
- Most wins (constructors): (Italy) Ferrari (14)
- Circuit length: 5.278 km (3.280 miles)
- Race length: 306.124 km (190.216 miles)
- Laps: 58
- Lap record: 1:15:096 ( (United Kingdom) Lando Norris, McLaren Racing, 2025)

Last race (2026)

Pole position
- (United Kingdom) George Russell; Mercedes; 1:18.518

Podium
- 1. (United Kingdom) G. Russell; Mercedes; 1:23:06.801; 2. (Italy) K. Antonelli; Mercedes; +2.974; 3. (Monaco) C. Leclerc; Ferrari; +15.519

Fastest lap
- (Netherlands) Max Verstappen; Red Bull Racing-Red Bull Ford; 1:22.091

The Australian Grand Prix is an annual Formula One motor racing event, taking place in Melbourne, Victoria. The event is contracted to be held at least until 2035. One of the oldest surviving motorsport competitions held in Australia, the Grand Prix has moved frequently with 23 different venues having been used since it was first run at Phillip Island in 1928. The race became part of the Formula One World Championship in 1985. Since 1996, it has been held at the Albert Park Circuit in Melbourne, with the exceptions of 2020 and 2021, when the races were cancelled due to the COVID-19 pandemic. Before that, it was held in Adelaide.

Historically, the Australian Grand Prix was held as either the last race of the season, when held at Adelaide, or as the opening round or early on at Melbourne. In 2022, it returned to the calendar as the third race of the season, following the Bahrain and Saudi Arabian Grands Prix. In 2025, the Grand Prix was moved back to the opening race slot of the season. The most attended race was the final edition of Adelaide in 1995, having also held the world record for race weekend attendance for over 30 years.

== History ==
=== Pre-war ===
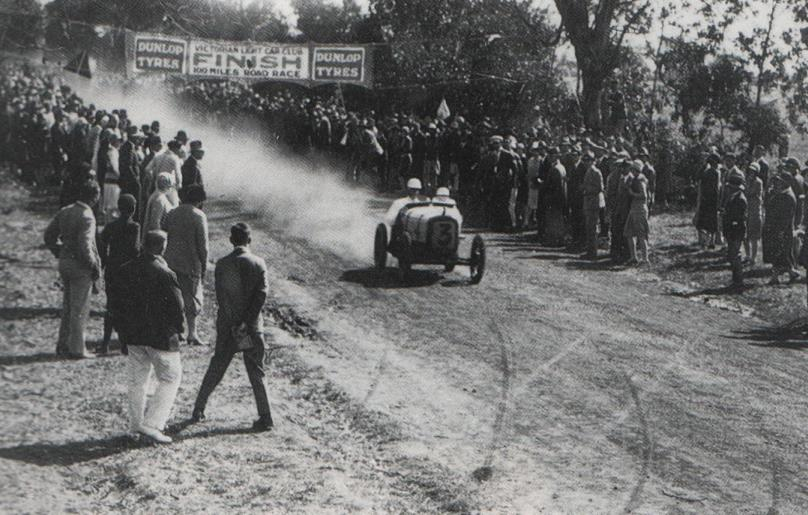
Arthur Waite won the 1928 100 Miles Road Race at the Phillip Island road circuit driving an Austin 7

While an event called the Australian Grand Prix was staged in 1927 at the grass surface Goulburn Racecourse held as a series of sprints, it is generally accepted that the Australian Grand Prix began as the 100 Miles Road Race held at the Phillip Island road circuit in 1928. The inaugural race was won by Arthur Waite in what was effectively an entry supported by the Austin Motor Company, a modified Austin 7. For eight years, races, first called the Australian Grand Prix in 1929, continued on the rectangular dirt road circuit. Bugattis dominated the results, taking four consecutive wins from 1929 to 1932. The last Phillip Island race was in 1935 and the title lapsed for three years. An AGP style event was held on Boxing Day, 1936 at the South Australian town of Victor Harbor for a centennial South Australian Grand Prix before the Australian Grand Prix title was revived in 1938 for the grand opening of what would become one of the world's most famous race tracks, Mount Panorama just outside the semi-rural town of Bathurst. Only just completed, with a tar seal for the circuit still a year away, the race was won by Englishman Peter Whitehead racing a new voiturette ERA B-Type that was just too fast for the locally developed machinery. One more race was held, at the Lobethal Circuit near the South Australian town of Lobethal in 1939, before the country was plunged into World War II.

=== Post-war ===
==== Early post-war races ====
In the immediate post-war era, racing was sparse with competitors using pre-war cars with supplies cobbled together around the rationing of fuel and tyres. Mount Panorama held the first post-war Grand Prix in 1947, beginning a rotational system between the Australian States, as fostered by the Australian Automobile Association. A mixture of stripped-down production sports cars and Australian "specials" were to take victories as the race travelled amongst temporary converted airfield circuits and street circuits like Point Cook, Leyburn, Nuriootpa and Narrogin before, on the race's return to Mount Panorama in 1952, the way to the future was pointed by Doug Whiteford racing a newly imported Talbot-Lago Formula One car to victory. Grand Prix machinery had already been filtering through in the shape of older Maserati and OSCAs and smaller Coopers but had yet to prove to be superior to the locally developed cars. The end of the Australian "specials" was coming, but the magnificent Maybach-based series of specials driven exuberantly by Stan Jones would give many hope for the next few years.

Lex Davison, who for several years would experiment with sports car engines in smaller Formula 2 chassis, took his first of four victories in a Jaguar engined Formula 2 HWM in 1954, while the previous year Whiteford won his third and final Grand Prix as for the first time racing cars thundered around the streets surrounding the Albert Park Lake in inner Melbourne. That circuit, which for four brief years gave Australia the strongest taste of the grandeur surrounding European Grand Prix racing, was 40 years later very much modified, used to host the 1996 Australian Grand Prix as the modern Formula One world championship venue. Jack Brabham took his first of three AGP wins in 1955 at the short Port Wakefield Circuit in South Australia. The race is significant in that Brabham was driving a Bristol powered Cooper T40, the first ever rear-engine car to win the Grand Prix.

The Grand Prix returned to Albert Park in 1956, the year when Melbourne hosted the Summer Olympics, to play host to a group of visiting European teams, led by Stirling Moss and the factory Maserati racing team who brought a fleet of 250F Grand Prix cars and 300S sports racing cars. Moss won the Grand Prix from Maserati teammate Jean Behra. That 1956 race would inspire the next great era of the Grand Prix.

==== Tasman Formula ====
The growing influence of engineer-drivers Jack Brabham and a couple of years behind him New Zealander Bruce McLaren would transform the race. Brabham, who first won the Grand Prix in 1955 in a Cooper T40 Bristol he had brought home from his first foray into English racing, would test new developments for Cooper during the European winter, beginning a flood of Cooper-Climax Grand Prix machinery into Australia and New Zealand before Brabham started building his own cars, as well as the appearance of Lotus chassis as well, finally killing off the Australian "specials". With European Formula One restricted by the 1.5-litre regulations and big powerful 2.5-litre Australian cars were tremendously attractive to the European teams and when BRM Grand Prix team toured Australia during the summer of 1962, the seed grew that became the Tasman Series.

The top European Formula One teams and drivers raced the European winters in Australia and New Zealand from 1963 to 1969 playing host to a golden age for racing in the region for which the Australian Grand Prix (and the New Zealand Grand Prix) became jewels of the summer. The popularity of the Tasman formulae was directly responsible for 1966's "return to power" in Formula One, and having spent years developing with Repco the Brabham cars and eventually the Oldsmobile-based Repco-Brabham V8s in the Tasman series gave Brabham the opportunity to unexpectedly dominate Formula One in his Brabhams with a ready-proven lightweight car that left Ferrari and the British "garagistes" struggling with their heavy, technically fragile or underpowered cars until the appearance of the Ford Cosworth DFV in 1967.

The Formula One stars of the era all visited the Tasman Series, including World Champions Jim Clark, John Surtees, Phil Hill, Jackie Stewart, Graham Hill and Jochen Rindt, while other F1 regulars Timmy Mayer, Pedro Rodriguez, Piers Courage, leading teams from Cooper, Lotus, Lola, BRM, even the four wheel drive Ferguson P99 and finally, Ferrari, racing against the local stars, Jack Brabham, Bruce McLaren, Denny Hulme, Chris Amon, Frank Gardner, Frank Matich, Leo Geoghegan and Kevin Bartlett. Brabham won the Grand Prix three times, McLaren twice, Clark twice, the second was his last major victory before his untimely death, winning a highly entertaining battle with Chris Amon at the 1968 Australian Grand Prix at Sandown Raceway. Graham Hill won the 1966 race, with Amon winning the final Tasman formulae race in 1969 leading home Ferrari teammate Derek Bell for a dominant 1–2 at Lakeside Raceway.

==== Formula 5000 ====
By the end of the decade, European teams were increasingly reluctant to commit to the Tasman Series in the face of longer home seasons, but also having to develop 2.5-litre versions of their 3.0 litre F1 engines. Local Tasman cars were declining as well and after originally opting a 2.0 litre version of Tasman to be the future of the Australian Grand Prix, the overwhelming support for the already well established Formula 5000 saw natural selection force Confederation of Australian Motorsport (CAMS)' hand.

For the first half of the 1970s, the Tasman Series continued as a local series primarily for Formula 5000 racers, but by 1976, the Australian and New Zealand legs fractured apart and the Australian Grand Prix separated from the remnants and became a stand-alone race once more. During this era, the former Tasman stars, Matich, Geoghegan and Bartlett would continue on as a new generation of drivers emerged, some like Garrie Cooper (Elfin) and Graham McRae developing their own cars while others like Max Stewart, John McCormack and Alfredo Costanzo using European-built cars, mostly Lolas. Matich won two Grands Prix is his own cars before Stewart and McRae each took a pair of wins. Towards the end of the 1970s, the race again became a home to returning European-based antipodeans like Alan Jones and Larry Perkins with Warwick Brown winning the 1977 race, while in 1976, touring car racer John Goss completed a remarkable double becoming the only driver to win the Grand Prix and the Bathurst 1000 touring car race.

==== Calder Park ====
Declining economy and the dominance of the local scene by Group C touring cars towards the latter part of the 1970s saw Formula 5000 gradually fall out of favour. By 1980, the decision to replace was once again imminent; however, the form of Alan Jones in Formula One saw entrepreneur Bob Jane seize an opportunity to bring Formula One back as the Grand Prix Formula. The 1980 event held at Jane's Calder Park Raceway saw a combined field of Formula One and Formula 5000 padded out with the Australised version of Formula Atlantic cars, Formula Pacific. The newly crowned world champion, Jones swept the field aside in his Williams-Ford, but with only two F1 cars entering (the other being the Alfa Romeo 179 driven by Bruno Giacomelli).

The continuing disintegration of F5000 saw Jane concentrate the next four Grands Prix on the Formula Pacific (later rebadged as Formula Mondial) category and importing Formula One drivers to race the locals in fields almost entirely made up of Ralt RT4s. Brazilian Roberto Moreno dominated this era, winning three of the four races, ceding only the 1982 race to future four-time World Champion Alain Prost.

Jane's attempt to bring the World Championship to Calder Park ultimately failed, as did a bid by Melbourne's other circuit Sandown (though Sandown was able to attract a round of the World Sportscar Championship to its upgraded track in 1984). As it turned out, F1 would be tempted away from Melbourne by a far more attractive option but it was listed as a reserve race in the 1982 F1 calendar.

=== Formula One ===
==== Adelaide (1985–1995) ====
Promotional poster for the first Australian Grand Prix in Adelaide in 1985.

The Australian Grand Prix became a round of the FIA Formula One World Championship in 1985 with the last race of the season held on the street circuit in Adelaide. The Adelaide Street Circuit, which held its last Formula One race in 1995.

The first Australian Grand Prix to be included as part of the Formula One World Championship was also the 50th AGP. The new 3.78 km Adelaide Street Circuit saw Brazilian Ayrton Senna on pole with a time of 1:19.843 in his Lotus–Renault. The race itself was a battle between Senna and Finland's Keke Rosberg driving a Williams–Honda for the last time. The 1986 event was a three-way race for the Drivers' Championship. Briton Nigel Mansell and Brazilian Nelson Piquet in Williams–Hondas and Frenchman Alain Prost, in a comparatively underpowered McLaren–TAG/Porsche, were competing for the drivers' title.1987 saw Gerhard Berger win in his Ferrari while Ayrton Senna finished second but was then disqualified for technical irregularities in his last race for Lotus; Berger's teammate Michele Alboreto was then moved up to second place to make the final result a Ferrari 1–2.

1988, the last Grand Prix of the turbo era, saw Alain Prost win his seventh race of the season from McLaren teammate and newly crowned World Champion Ayrton Senna with outgoing champion Nelson Piquet third for Lotus, giving Honda turbo's all three podium positions. The race was also the 15th win and 15th pole in 16 races in a season of total dominance for McLaren-Honda, a domination not seen before or since in Formula One. 1989 was hit by a deluge of rain.Prost got his third Drivers' Championship.

1990 was the 500th World Championship Grand Prix ever held; and it came after yet more controversial events at Suzuka. Senna won the 1990 World Championship.

The 1991 race was notable for being held in extremely wet and tricky conditions The Drivers' Championship had already been decided in Senna's favour; but the Constructors' Championship was still yet to be decided between McLaren and Williams. Senna's victory plus his teammate Gerhard Berger's third gave McLaren its fourth consecutive Constructors' Championship.

1992 saw Senna drive very hard to try to stay with new world champion Mansell's dominant Williams; Senna's teammate Gerhard Berger won the race. 1993 saw Senna win what was to be his 41st and final victory and final race for McLaren ahead of Alain Prost, who was competing in his final Formula One race in a Williams before he too retired. Senna embraced his once extremely bitter rival Prost on the podium. It was announced around this time that the Australian Grand Prix would be moving to Melbourne for 1996.

In 1994, 41-year-old Nigel Mansell won the race for Williams, becoming the oldest Grand Prix winner since Jack Brabham in 1970.

In 1995, the final F1 race at Adelaide was won by Damon Hill in a Williams, with almost all of his main rivals including Schumacher retiring, and Hill finished two laps ahead of second-placed Olivier Panis.

==== Melbourne (1996–2019, 2022–present) ====
Albert Park Circuit (1996–2020)

In 1993 prominent Melbourne businessman Ron Walker began working with the Kennett government to make Melbourne the host of the event. After the government of Jeff Kennett spent an undisclosed amount, it was announced on 17 December 1993 (less than a week after the South Australian election) that the race would be shifted to a rebuilt Albert Park Circuit in Melbourne. The race would move to Melbourne from 1996. The decision was made without parliamentary debate, Cabinet discussion or public consultation. The Australian Grand Prix Act 1994 (No. 68 of 1994 (Vic)) was subsequently passed by the Victorian Parliament, that exempted the event from existing freedom of information, planning, environmental laws and judicial review by the Supreme Court.

The Australian Grand Prix at Adelaide in 1985–1995 was always the last event in the Formula One calendar – but from 1996 onwards, it has usually been the first event or was held early in the season.

The decision to hold the race there was controversial. A series of protests were organised by the "Save Albert Park" group, which claimed that the race turned a public park into a private playground for one week per year. Additionally, they claimed that the race cost a great deal of money that would be better spent, if it were to be spent on motor racing, on a permanent circuit elsewhere. Finally, they said that the claimed economic benefits of the race were false or exaggerated. The race organisers and the government claimed that the economic benefits to the state, although unquantifiable, outweighed the costs, and highlighted that the park's public amenities have been greatly improved from the World War II vintage facilities previously located at Albert Park; the Melbourne Sports and Aquatic Centre (scene of many Melbourne 2006 Commonwealth Games events) being the centre piece and best known of the revitalised facilities. Opponents of holding the race in the park point out that the Aquatic Centre adds nothing to the Grand Prix, is effectively closed for weeks surrounding the event and could have been built independent of the car race.

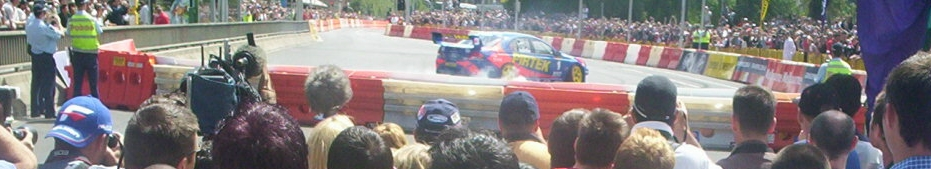
Demonstration event held in Melbourne just before the start of the 2005 Grand Prix

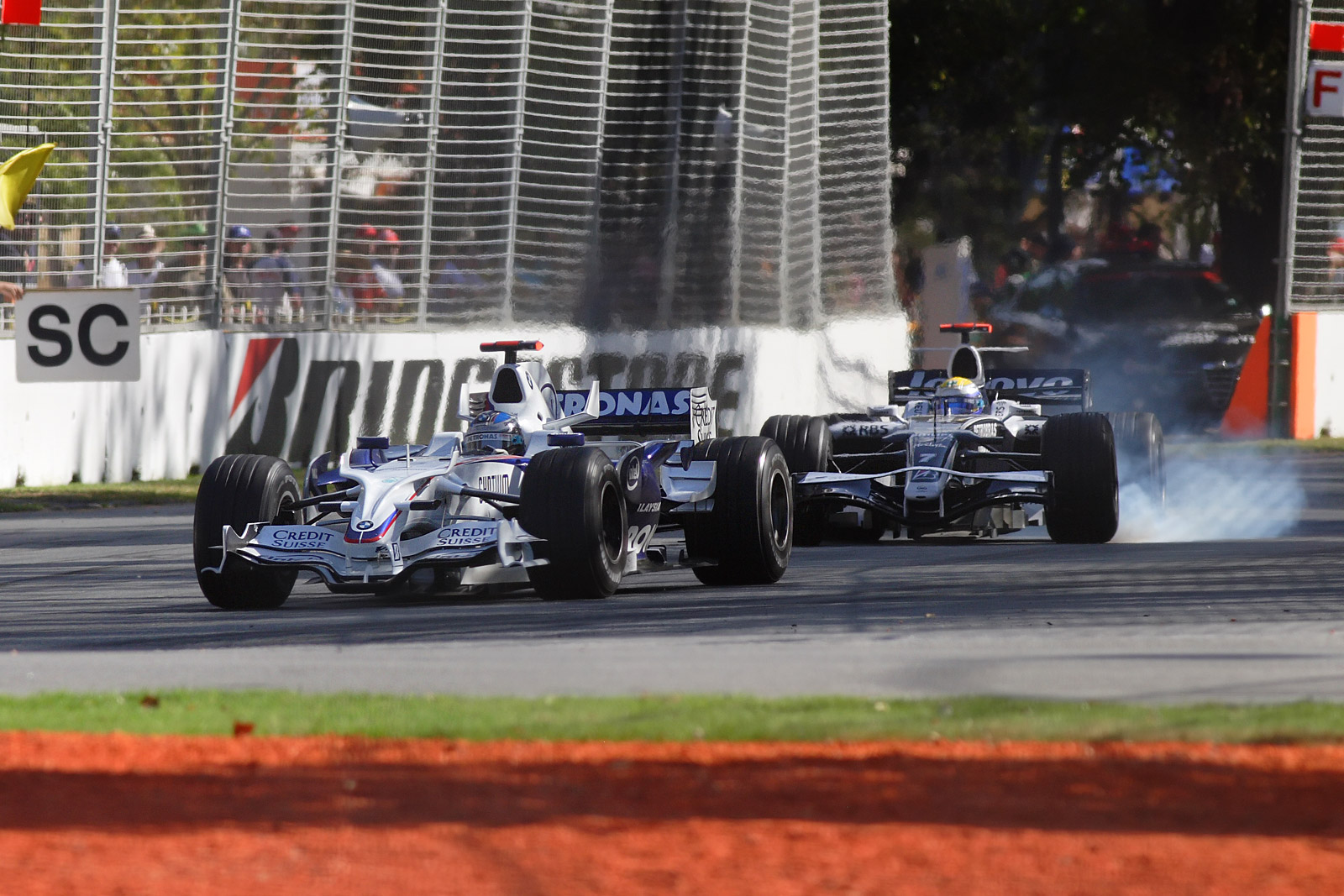
Nick Heidfeld and Nico Rosberg at Corner 6 in 2008

Albert Park, within easy reach of the Melbourne central business district, became home to the Australian Grand Prix in Melbourne. A 16-turn circuit, which measures 5.3 km (3.3 mi) in its current guise, it was built utilising a combination of public roads and a car park within the park. The circuit is renowned as being a smooth and high-speed test for Formula One teams and drivers. Its characteristics are similar to the only other street circuit set in a public park used in the Formula One World Championship, the Circuit Gilles Villeneuve in Montreal which hosts the Canadian Grand Prix.

The promotional theme for the first race in Melbourne was "Melbourne – What a Great Place for the Race". Some 401,000 people turned out for the four days leading up to and including the first race in 1996, which remains a record for the event. The logistics of creating a temporary circuit and hosting an event of the magnitude of a Formula One Grand Prix from scratch were not lost on the international visitors, with Melbourne winning the F1 Constructors' Association Award for the best organised Grand Prix of the year in its first two years (1996 and 1997).

It took just three corners for the Australian Grand Prix at Albert Park to gain worldwide attention. On the first lap of the first race in 1996, Jordan's Martin Brundle was launched into the air in an enormous accident. Footage of the crash, and Brundle's subsequent rush back to the pits to take the spare car for the restart, ensured the first race in Melbourne gained widespread coverage. The race was won by Williams's Damon Hill.

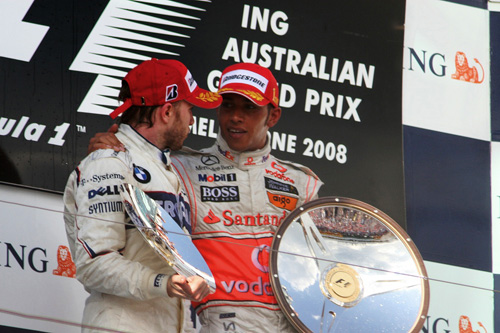
2008 race winner Lewis Hamilton on the podium with Nick Heidfeld

The 1997 race saw McLaren, through David Coulthard, break a drought of 50 races without a victory. The next year was a McLaren benefit, with Mika Häkkinen and Coulthard lapping the entire field en route to a dominant 1–2 finish.

The start of the 2002 race saw pole-sitter Barrichello and Williams's Ralf Schumacher come together at Turn One in a spectacular accident that saw 11 of the 22 cars eliminated before the end of the opening lap. Michael Schumacher dominated thereafter to post a third straight Melbourne win, but his achievements were overshadowed by the fifth place of Australian Mark Webber on his Formula One debut. The next year, 2003, saw Coulthard again win for McLaren in a race held in variable conditions. Normal service was resumed in 2004 with the Ferraris of Schumacher and Barrichello running rampant – within two laps of Friday practice, Schumacher had obliterated the Albert Park lap record, and sailed to a crushing win. In 2005, the race was won by Renault's Giancarlo Fisichella after a storm during Saturday qualifying produced a topsy-turvy grid. Barrichello and Fisichella's teammate Fernando Alonso came through the field from 11th and 13th on the grid respectively to join pole sitter Fisichella on the podium.

In 2006, Alonso took his first Australian win in an accident-marred race that featured four safety car periods. In 2007 Kimi Räikkönen won in his first race for Ferrari, while rookie Lewis Hamilton became the first driver in 11 years to finish on the podium in his F1 debut, finishing third behind his McLaren teammate Alonso. Hamilton won the 2008 race which had three safety car periods and only six finishers. In 2009 Jenson Button took the victory, driving for debutant team Brawn GP.

2010 again saw Button win at Melbourne. The 2011 race saw Vettel take victory in the Red Bull, with Hamilton second and Vitaly Petrov third for Lotus. This was the first ever podium for a Russian Formula One driver. 2012 saw Button win for the third time in four years at the circuit. 2013 saw a surprise victory with Raikkonen in the Lotus winning from Alonso and Vettel. The reintroduction of V6 turbo hybrid engines for 2014 saw a dominant performance from Mercedes's Nico Rosberg at the Grand Prix, who took the victory from the McLarens of Kevin Magnussen and Button, both of whom were promoted due to the disqualification of Daniel Ricciardo in the Red Bull post race for illegal fuel flow. 2015 saw Hamilton take the victory from teammate Rosberg, with Vettel completing the top three.

In 2020, it was planned to hold the Grand Prix despite the coronavirus epidemic in the country. Ferrari and AlphaTauri as teams based in Italy, the most coronavirus-infected country in Europe at the time, expressed concern about the possibility of leaving the quarantine zone. One of McLaren's mechanics got flu-like symptoms when he arrived in Australia, his coronavirus test returned positive and the British team withdrew from the race. Later, a photographer was also confirmed to have coronavirus. It was announced that the Grand Prix would still take place, but without spectators, however two hours before the first practice started the event was cancelled.

In June 2022, Melbourne's contract to host the Australian Grand Prix, which was due to expire in 2025, was extended to 2035. The new contract stipulates that the Australian Grand Prix will be one of the first three rounds of the season over the contract period and will host a minimum of five season-opening races over the 13 years between 2023 and 2035. From 2023, Formula 2 and Formula 3 races will form part of the race weekend schedule. A further two-year extension was signed in December 2022, ensuring that the race would remain in Melbourne until 2037.

After a two-year absence as a result of the COVID-19 pandemic, the Australian Grand Prix returned in 2022. Unlike previous years, when it was the opening event of the season, the 2022 Australian Grand Prix was instead the third event of the season. In the months before the Grand Prix, in consultation with drivers, the circuit underwent several significant revisions, which were the first and most significant changes since the inaugural 1996 Australian Grand Prix, including the first track resurfacing since then. The 2022 Grand Prix saw Ferrari's Charles Leclerc achieve his first career grand slam, having started in pole position, set the fastest lap, led every lap, and won the race ahead of Red Bull's Sergio Pérez and Mercedes' George Russell. It was the first grand slam for an individual Ferrari driver since Fernando Alonso's at the 2010 Singapore Grand Prix. The 2022 edition set a new attendance record at the circuit for the weekend, with a reported 419,114 attendees, including 128,294 on race day; these figures made the 2022 Grand Prix the highest attended Grand Prix ever held in Melbourne and one of the most popular sporting weekends in Australian history. The 2023 edition, which saw Max Verstappen win his maiden Australian Grand Prix, would break the record with 444,631 attendees, and would also break a Formula One record; the race, which ended with twelve cars left running, is the first ever to have three red flags throughout the session. This came after a chaotic race that saw many incidents; the Formula 2 and Formula 3 races, held the same weekend, had a similar outcome.

The 2024 Australian Grand Prix, won by Carlos Sainz Jr., was notable for breaking numerous attendance records. The event sold out for the first time in its history, and set a new attendance record at the circuit for the weekend with 452,055 spectators, making it the most attended sporting event ever in Melbourne, and the fourth highest attended Formula One Grand Prix of all time, following the 1995 edition of the race, held in Adelaide, with 520,000 attendees, and the 2023 and 2024 British Grands Prix, which both drew 480,000 attendees. The 2025 Australian Grand Prix was won by Lando Norris after home favourite Oscar Piastri spun out of second place. Norris was under serious pressure as Max Verstappen chased him till the end. George Russell completed the podium. A new attendance record at the circuit for the weekend with 465,498 spectators was set, making it the most attended sporting event ever in Melbourne and the fourth highest attended Formula One Grand Prix of all time.

== Calendar change ==
The move of the Australian Grand Prix to Melbourne saw a change in the time of year that the Formula 1 teams and personnel made their annual voyage to Australia. Adelaide, for each of its 11 years, was the final race of the F1 season, usually in October or November, while Melbourne has been the first race of the season in 23 out of the 28 times it has hosted the Grand Prix. (Note: Since the first race in Melbourne in 1996, the races which have not been first in the season are: 2006 (when it was the third race of the year to allow for the Commonwealth Games to take place in the city), 2010 (when it was the second race), and 2022–2024 (when it was the third race). With the event not taking place in 2020 (when it was scheduled to be the season opener but was cancelled due to the COVID-19 pandemic) and 2021 (when it was first postponed to later in the season and later cancelled, again due to the COVID-19 pandemic).) As such, the Albert Park circuit has seen the Formula One debuts of many drivers. 1997 World Champion Jacques Villeneuve made his race debut in Melbourne's first year of 1996, and became one of three men to secure pole position in his maiden Grand Prix. Other prominent names to debut in Melbourne are seven-time world champion Lewis Hamilton (2007), four-time World Champion Max Verstappen (2015), two-time World Champion Fernando Alonso and one-time champion Kimi Räikkönen (both in 2001); former Australian F1 driver, Mark Webber, also made his debut there in 2002.

As part of celebrations for the tenth running of the event at Albert Park in 2005, Webber drove his Williams F1 car over the Sydney Harbour Bridge in a promotional event, and the Melbourne city streets hosted a parade of F1 machinery and Supercars, Australia's highest-profile domestic motor sport category. For over thirty years, Supercars have competed in the Supercars Challenge non-championship event at the Australian Grand Prix. In 2018, the event was contested for championship points for the first time, and was known as the Melbourne 400.

The 2021 event was originally scheduled to open the season in March, but moved to November due to COVID-19 restrictions and travel disruptions, then cancelled on 6 July. It was also going through several changes to make the track faster.

== Economic impact ==
An issue that is frequently debated amongst both supporters and opponents of the Australian Grand Prix centres around the event's economic impact for the state of Victoria; proponents of the event claim that the event increases tourism, creates jobs and generates millions of dollars for the state of Victoria, while opponents dispute the event's economic benefits and cite the cost on taxpayers to host the event, as well as the disruptions generated by the event. In 2014, the Victorian government claimed the annual economic impact of hosting the Australian Grand Prix was between $32 million and $39 million, with the event generating significant economic, social and cultural benefits including job creation, industry development, inward investment and tourism, while opponents of the event claimed that the event cost Victorian taxpayers over $50 million to host.

According to a 2022 economic impact assessment conducted by Ernst & Young, the 2022 Australian Grand Prix generated an estimated $92 million of direct spending in the Victorian economy and boosted Victoria's Gross State Product by an estimated $171 million, with the Grand Prix also credited for driving up hotel occupancy and stimulating patronage for hospitality businesses. This mirrors a 2011 EY report commissioned by Tourism Victoria, which found international exposure and tourism spending stemming from hosting the Grand Prix generated between $32.04 million and $39.34 million for Victoria's Gross State Product during the period in which the Grand Prix was held, while also generating between 351 and 411 full-time equivalent jobs. According to an Economic Impact Assessment conducted by EY, the 2023 Australian Grand Prix contributed an estimated $268 million to the Victorian economy, including $144 million in direct expenditure and the creation of 1,149 full-time equivalent jobs, with $128 million of direct investment contributed by 81,000 international and interstate visitors who attended the event.

However, a cost-benefit analysis of the Australian Grand Prix done for the Auditor-General in 2005 revealed a net economic loss for Victoria, with the estimated costs of the event exceeding the benefits to Victorian taxpayers by 5 per cent, a 2007 auditor-general's report found costs to host the event exceeded benefits by $6.7 million, while a 2012 report commissioned by Economists at Large for Save Albert Park estimated that the 2012 Grand Prix resulted in a net economic loss to Victoria of between $48.8m and $66.7m, with a mid-range estimate of $60.55m. The 2007 Australian Grand Prix ran at a $34.6 million loss, while according to Crikey, the Australian Grand Prix made losses of $59.97 million in 2014, $61.7 million in 2015, $61 million in 2016 and $57.1 million in 2017.

Over the decade preceding 2022, the Australian Grand Prix collectively cost Victorian taxpayers $537.5 million to host, with the 2019 Australian Grand Prix alone costing Victorian taxpayers $60.2 million to host, the 2022 Australian Grand Prix alone costing Victorian taxpayers $78.1 million to host, and the 2023 Grand Prix alone costing Victorian taxpayers $100.6 million to host. The 2019 event generated $55 million in revenue but cost $115.2 million to stage, the 2022 event generated $75.1 million in revenue but cost $153.2 million to stage, and the 2023 event generated $96.9 million in revenue but cost $197.6 million to stage.

== Spectator attendance since 1995 ==
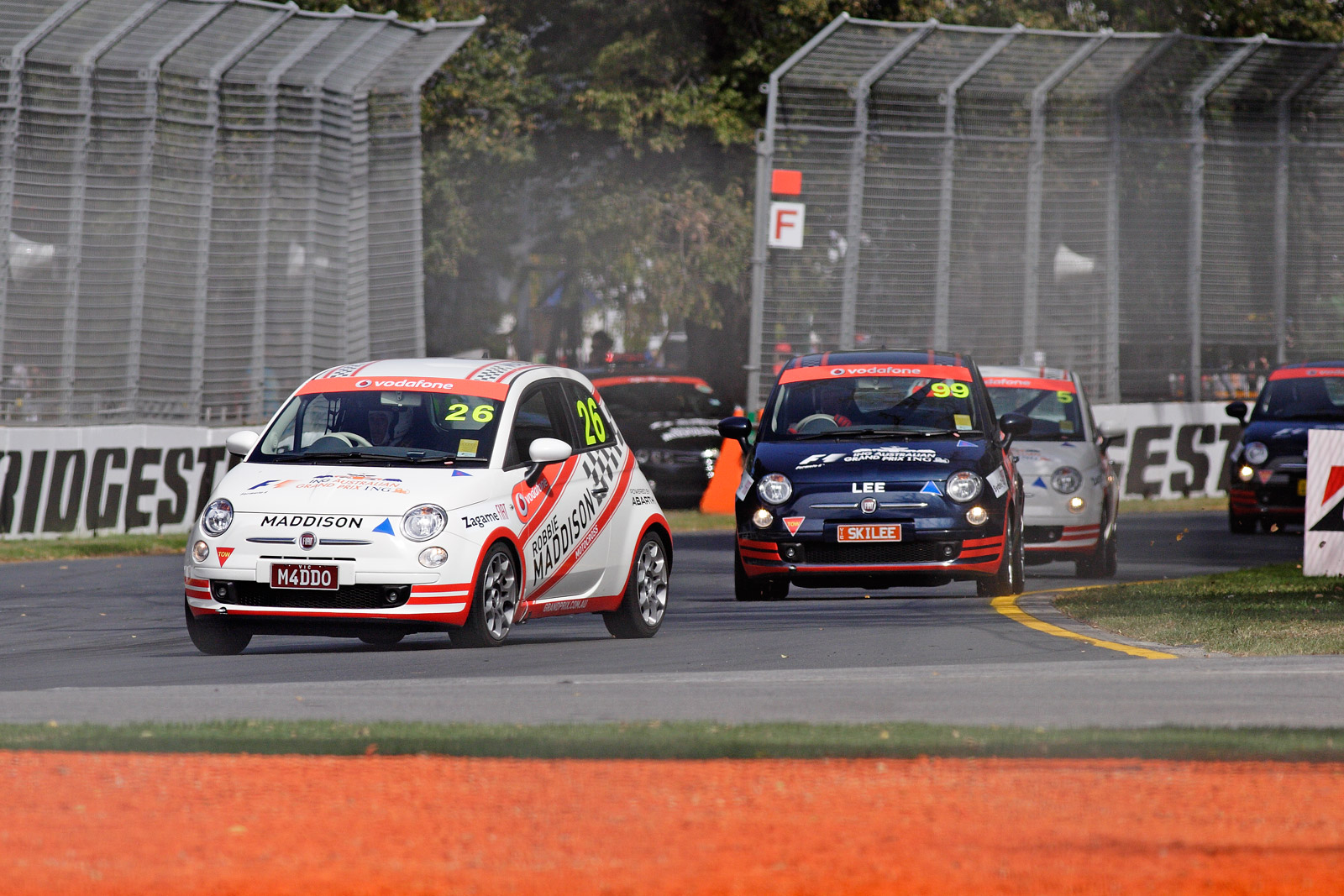
Celebrity Challenge, 2008 GP

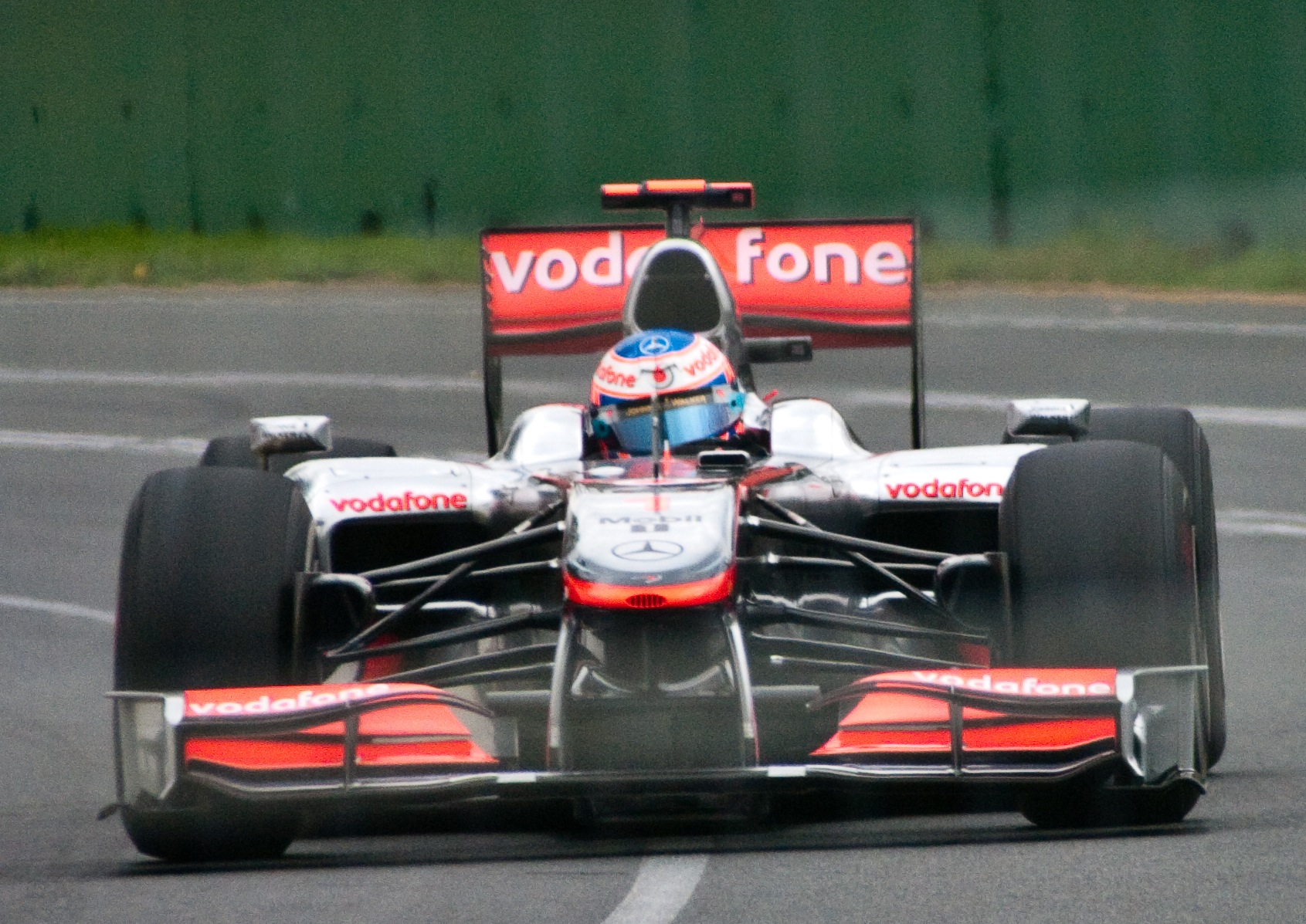
Jenson Button, winner of the 2009, 2010 and 2012 Australian Grands Prix

Following the move of the Australian Grand Prix to Melbourne, spectator attendance peaked at 483,934 in 2026, but has never reached that of the last Adelaide race in 1995.

In 2009, higher unemployment and a snap public transport strike were cited by Victorian Premier John Brumby as a reason for a slight drop in crowds. Attendance numbers improved in 2010 to an estimate of 305,000 – the largest since the 2005 race.

In contrast to other major sporting events in Australia such as the AFL Grand Final, the Melbourne Cup, the Australian Open and the Boxing Day Test, the Australian Grand Prix Corporation does not release precise crowd figures for the Australian Grand Prix, citing security concerns; in responding to a freedom of information request, the Australian Grand Prix Corporation stated in 2022 that it believes that crowd figures are sensitive from a security and safety perspective, and disclosing it has the potential to affect the security of Victoria by assisting the operational system of possible threat actors. Following an August 2023 freedom-of-information ruling by the Office of the Victorian Information Commissioner which stated that that disclosure was important for "transparency and accountability", in September 2024, the Australian Grand Prix Corporation went to the Victorian Civil and Administrative Tribunal to successfully fight an order to reveal how it counts crowds for the Australian Grand Prix.

Official attendance numbers, which are inexact and have been challenged by the anti-Grand Prix lobby group Save Albert Park as gross overestimates, have been as follows:

- 1995 (Adelaide) – 520,000 (210,000 on race day)
- 1996 (Melbourne) – 401,000 (150,000 on race day)
- 1997 – 289,000
- 2004 – 360,885 (121,500 on race day)
- 2005 – 359,000 (103,000 on race day)
- 2006 – 301,800
- 2007 – 301,000 (105,000 on race day)
- 2008 – 303,000 (108,000 on race day)
- 2009 – 286,900
- 2010 – 305,000 (108,500 on race day)
- 2011 – 298,000 (111,000 on race day)
- 2012 – 313,700 (114,900 on race day)
- 2013 – 323,000 (103,000 on race day)
- 2014 – 314,900 (100,500 on race day)
- 2015 – 296,600 (101,000 on race day)
- 2016 – 272,300 (90,200 on race day)
- 2017 – 296,600
- 2018 – 295,000
- 2019 – 324,000 (100,000 on race day)
- 2022 – 419,114 (128,294 on race day)
- 2023 – 444,631 (131,124 on race day)
- 2024 – 452,055 (132,106 on race day)
- 2025 – 465,498 (131,547 on race day)
- 2026 – 483,934 (137,869 on race day)

== Winners ==
=== By year ===
Adelaide, used in Formula One from 1985 to 1995

Melbourne, used in Formula One from 1996 to 2019 and since 2022

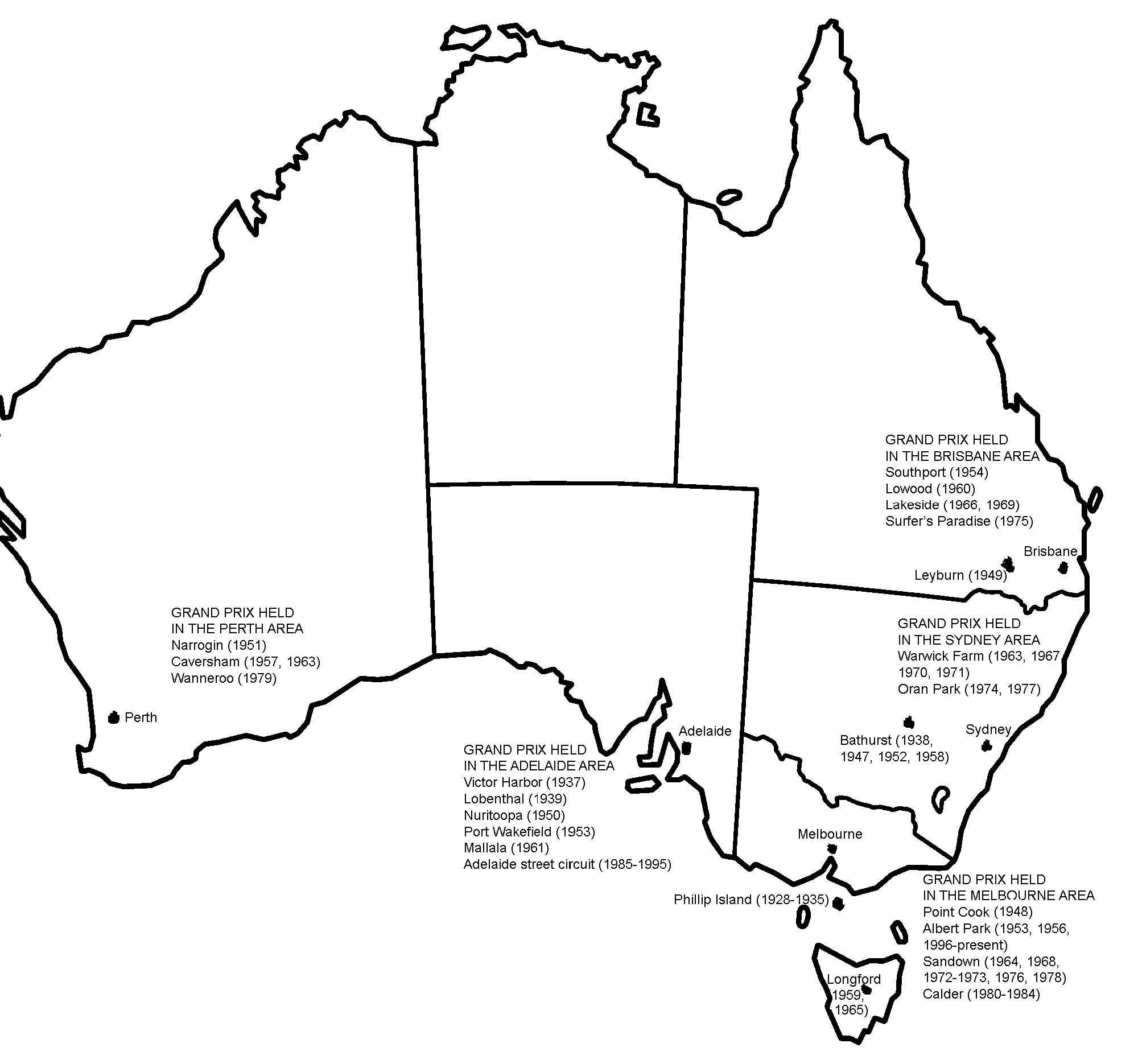
A map of all the locations of the Australian Grand Prix.

A pink background indicates an event which was not part of the Formula One World Championship.

- * From 1932 to 1948, the winner was determined on a handicap basis.
- + The 1937 event was staged as the "South Australian Centenary Grand Prix" on 26 December 1936.
- # The 1928 event was officially known as the "100 Miles Road Race".

Year	Driver	Constructor	Location	Report
1928 #	(Australia) Arthur Waite	Austin	Phillip Island	Report
1929	(Australia) Arthur Terdich	Bugatti	Phillip Island	Report
1930	(Australia) Bill Thompson	Bugatti	Phillip Island	Report
1931	(Australia) Carl Junker	Bugatti	Phillip Island	Report
1932	(Australia) Bill Thompson *	Bugatti	Phillip Island	Report
1933	(Australia) Bill Thompson *	Riley	Phillip Island	Report
1934	(Australia) Bob Lea-Wright *	Singer	Phillip Island	Report
1935	(Australia) Les Murphy *	MG	Phillip Island	Report
1936	Not held			
1937 +	(Australia) Les Murphy *	MG	Victor Harbor	Report
1938	(United Kingdom) Peter Whitehead *	ERA	Bathurst	Report
1939	(Australia) Alan Tomlinson *	MG	Lobethal	Report
1940 – 1946	Not held due to World War II			
1947	(Australia) Bill Murray *	MG	Bathurst	Report
1948	(New Zealand) Frank Pratt *	BMW	Point Cook	Report
1949	(Australia) John Crouch	Delahaye	Leyburn	Report
1950	(Australia) Doug Whiteford	Ford	Nuriootpa	Report
1951	(Australia) Warwick Pratley	GRS-Ford	Narrogin	Report
1952	(Australia) Doug Whiteford	Talbot-Lago	Bathurst	Report
1953	(Australia) Doug Whiteford	Talbot-Lago	Albert Park	Report
1954	(Australia) Lex Davison	HWM-Jaguar	Southport	Report
1955	(Australia) Jack Brabham	Cooper-Bristol	Port Wakefield	Report
1956	(United Kingdom) Stirling Moss	Maserati	Albert Park	Report
1957	(Australia) Lex Davison (Australia) Bill Patterson	Ferrari	Caversham	Report
1958	(Australia) Lex Davison	Ferrari	Bathurst	Report
1959	(Australia) Stan Jones	Maserati	Longford	Report
1960	(Australia) Alec Mildren	Cooper-Maserati	Lowood	Report
1961	(Australia) Lex Davison	Cooper-Climax	Mallala	Report
1962	(New Zealand) Bruce McLaren	Cooper-Climax	Caversham	Report
1963	(Australia) Jack Brabham	Brabham-Climax	Warwick Farm	Report
1964	(Australia) Jack Brabham	Brabham-Climax	Sandown	Report
1965	(New Zealand) Bruce McLaren	Cooper-Climax	Longford	Report
1966	(United Kingdom) Graham Hill	BRM	Lakeside	Report
1967	(United Kingdom) Jackie Stewart	BRM	Warwick Farm	Report
1968	(United Kingdom) Jim Clark	Lotus-Cosworth	Sandown	Report
1969	(New Zealand) Chris Amon	Ferrari	Lakeside	Report
1970	(Australia) Frank Matich	McLaren-Repco/Holden	Warwick Farm	Report
1971	(Australia) Frank Matich	Matich-Repco/Holden	Warwick Farm	Report
1972	(New Zealand) Graham McRae	Leda-Chevrolet	Sandown	Report
1973	(New Zealand) Graham McRae	McRae-Chevrolet	Sandown	Report
1974	(Australia) Max Stewart	Lola-Chevrolet	Oran Park	Report
1975	(Australia) Max Stewart	Lola-Chevrolet	Surfers Paradise	Report
1976	(Australia) John Goss	Matich-Repco/Holden	Sandown	Report
1977	(Australia) Warwick Brown	Lola-Chevrolet	Oran Park	Report
1978	(New Zealand) Graham McRae	McRae-Chevrolet	Sandown	Report
1979	(Australia) Johnnie Walker	Lola-Chevrolet	Wanneroo	Report
1980	(Australia) Alan Jones	Williams-Cosworth	Calder	Report
1981	(Brazil) Roberto Moreno	Ralt-Ford	Calder	Report
1982	(France) Alain Prost	Ralt-Ford	Calder	Report
1983	(Brazil) Roberto Moreno	Ralt-Ford	Calder	Report
1984	(Brazil) Roberto Moreno	Ralt-Ford	Calder	Report
1985	(Finland) Keke Rosberg	Williams-Honda	Adelaide	Report
1986	(France) Alain Prost	McLaren-TAG	Adelaide	Report
1987	(Austria) Gerhard Berger	Ferrari	Adelaide	Report
1988	(France) Alain Prost	McLaren-Honda	Adelaide	Report
1989	(Belgium) Thierry Boutsen	Williams-Renault	Adelaide	Report
1990	(Brazil) Nelson Piquet	Benetton-Ford	Adelaide	Report
1991	(Brazil) Ayrton Senna	McLaren-Honda	Adelaide	Report
1992	(Austria) Gerhard Berger	McLaren-Honda	Adelaide	Report
1993	(Brazil) Ayrton Senna	McLaren-Ford	Adelaide	Report
1994	(United Kingdom) Nigel Mansell	Williams-Renault	Adelaide	Report
1995	(United Kingdom) Damon Hill	Williams-Renault	Adelaide	Report
1996	(United Kingdom) Damon Hill	Williams-Renault	Albert Park	Report
1997	(United Kingdom) David Coulthard	McLaren-Mercedes	Albert Park	Report
1998	(Finland) Mika Häkkinen	McLaren-Mercedes	Albert Park	Report
1999	(United Kingdom) Eddie Irvine	Ferrari	Albert Park	Report
2000	(Germany) Michael Schumacher	Ferrari	Albert Park	Report
2001	(Germany) Michael Schumacher	Ferrari	Albert Park	Report
2002	(Germany) Michael Schumacher	Ferrari	Albert Park	Report
2003	(United Kingdom) David Coulthard	McLaren-Mercedes	Albert Park	Report
2004	(Germany) Michael Schumacher	Ferrari	Albert Park	Report
2005	(Italy) Giancarlo Fisichella	Renault	Albert Park	Report
2006	(Spain) Fernando Alonso	Renault	Albert Park	Report
2007	(Finland) Kimi Räikkönen	Ferrari	Albert Park	Report
2008	(United Kingdom) Lewis Hamilton	McLaren-Mercedes	Albert Park	Report
2009	(United Kingdom) Jenson Button	Brawn-Mercedes	Albert Park	Report
2010	(United Kingdom) Jenson Button	McLaren-Mercedes	Albert Park	Report
2011	(Germany) Sebastian Vettel	Red Bull-Renault	Albert Park	Report
2012	(United Kingdom) Jenson Button	McLaren-Mercedes	Albert Park	Report
2013	(Finland) Kimi Räikkönen	Lotus-Renault	Albert Park	Report
2014	(Germany) Nico Rosberg	Mercedes	Albert Park	Report
2015	(United Kingdom) Lewis Hamilton	Mercedes	Albert Park	Report
2016	(Germany) Nico Rosberg	Mercedes	Albert Park	Report
2017	(Germany) Sebastian Vettel	Ferrari	Albert Park	Report
2018	(Germany) Sebastian Vettel	Ferrari	Albert Park	Report
2019	(Finland) Valtteri Bottas	Mercedes	Albert Park	Report
2020	Cancelled due to COVID-19 pandemic			Report
2021	Not held due to COVID-19 pandemic			
2022	(Monaco) Charles Leclerc	Ferrari	Albert Park	Report
2023	(Netherlands) Max Verstappen	Red Bull-Honda RBPT	Albert Park	Report
2024	(Spain) Carlos Sainz Jr.	Ferrari	Albert Park	Report
2025	(United Kingdom) Lando Norris	McLaren-Mercedes	Albert Park	Report
2026	(United Kingdom) George Russell	Mercedes	Albert Park	Report

=== Repeat winners (drivers) ===
Drivers in bold are competing in the Formula One championship 2026.
A pink background indicates an event which was not part of the Formula One World Championship.

Four-time World Drivers' Champion Alain Prost was the only driver to win the race in both World Championship and domestic formats. Prost won the Australian Drivers' Championship 1982 race, driving a Formula Pacific Ralt RT4, before winning in Adelaide in 1986 and 1988 in Formula One.

Australian driver Lex Davison and German driver Michael Schumacher are the most successful drivers in the 88-year history of the event taking four wins each, while Ferrari has been the most successful constructor with fourteen victories.

Wins	Driver	Years won
4	(Australia) Lex Davison	1954, 1957, 1958, 1961
4	(Germany) Michael Schumacher	2000, 2001, 2002, 2004
3	(Australia) Bill Thompson	1930, 1932, 1933
3	(Australia) Doug Whiteford	1950, 1952, 1953
3	(Australia) Jack Brabham	1955, 1963, 1964
3	(New Zealand) Graham McRae	1972, 1973, 1978
3	(Brazil) Roberto Moreno	1981, 1983, 1984
3	(France) Alain Prost	1982, 1986, 1988
3	(United Kingdom) Jenson Button	2009, 2010, 2012
3	(Germany) Sebastian Vettel	2011, 2017, 2018
2	(Australia) Les Murphy	1935, 1937
2	(New Zealand) Bruce McLaren	1962, 1965
2	(Australia) Frank Matich	1970, 1971
2	(Australia) Max Stewart	1974, 1975
2	(Austria) Gerhard Berger	1987, 1992
2	(Brazil) Ayrton Senna	1991, 1993
2	(United Kingdom) Damon Hill	1995, 1996
2	(United Kingdom) David Coulthard	1997, 2003
2	(Finland) Kimi Räikkönen	2007, 2013
2	(United Kingdom) **Lewis Hamilton**	2008, 2015
2	(Germany) Nico Rosberg	2014, 2016

=== Repeat winners (constructors) ===
Teams in bold are competing in the Formula One championship in 2026.
A pink background indicates an event which was not part of the Formula One World Championship.

Wins	Constructor	Years won
14	(Italy) **Ferrari**	1957, 1958, 1969, 1987, 1999, 2000, 2001, 2002, 2004, 2007, 2017, 2018, 2022, 2024
13	(United Kingdom) **McLaren**	1970, 1986, 1988, 1991, 1992, 1993, 1997, 1998, 2003, 2008, 2010, 2012, 2025
6	(United Kingdom) **Williams**	1980, 1985, 1989, 1994, 1995, 1996
5	(United Kingdom) Cooper	1955, 1960, 1961, 1962, 1965
5	(Germany) **Mercedes**	2014, 2015, 2016, 2019, 2026
4	(France) Bugatti	1929, 1930, 1931, 1932
4	(United Kingdom) MG	1935, 1937, 1939, 1947
4	(United Kingdom) Lola	1974, 1975, 1977, 1979
4	(United Kingdom) Ralt	1981, 1982, 1983, 1984
2	(France) Talbot-Lago	1952, 1953
2	(Italy) Maserati	1956, 1959
2	(United Kingdom) Brabham	1963, 1964
2	(United Kingdom) BRM	1966, 1967
2	(Australia) Matich	1971, 1976
2	(New Zealand) McRae	1973, 1978
2	(France) Renault	2005, 2006
2	(Austria) **Red Bull**	2011, 2023

=== Repeat winners (engine manufacturers) ===
Manufacturers in bold are competing in the Formula One championship in 2026.
A pink background indicates an event which was not part of the Formula One World Championship.

Wins	Manufacturer	Years won
14	(Italy) **Ferrari**	1957, 1958, 1969, 1987, 1999, 2000, 2001, 2002, 2004, 2007, 2017, 2018, 2022, 2024
13	(Germany) **Mercedes** *	1997, 1998, 2003, 2008, 2009, 2010, 2012, 2014, 2015, 2016, 2019, 2025, 2026
10	(United States) Ford **	1950, 1951, 1968, 1980, 1981, 1982, 1983, 1984, 1990, 1993
8	(France) Renault	1989, 1994, 1995, 1996, 2005, 2006, 2011, 2013
7	(United States) Chevrolet	1972, 1973, 1974, 1975, 1977, 1978, 1979
5	(United Kingdom) Climax	1961, 1962, 1963, 1964 1965
4	(France) Bugatti	1929, 1930, 1931, 1932
4	(United Kingdom) MG	1935, 1937, 1939, 1947
4	(Japan) **Honda**	1985, 1988, 1991, 1992
3	(Italy) Maserati	1956, 1959, 1960
3	(Australia) Repco/Holden	1970, 1971, 1976
2	(France) Talbot-Lago	1952, 1953
2	(United Kingdom) BRM	1966, 1967

* Between 1997 and 2003 built by Ilmor

** Between 1968 and 1993 designed and built by Cosworth, funded by Ford

== See also ==
- Motorsport in Australia
- Albert Park Circuit
- List of Australian motor racing series
