= 1973 Australian Grand Prix =

- Race 4 of 5 in 1973 Australian Drivers' Championship

Race details
- Date: 4 November 1973
- Official name: XXXVIII Australian Grand Prix
- Location: Sandown Raceway, Melbourne, Victoria
- Course: Permanent racing facility
- Course length: 3.1 km (1.92 miles)
- Distance: 52 laps, 161.2 km (99.84 miles)
- Weather: Sunny

Pole position
Driver	(Australia) John McCormack	Elfin-Repco Holden
- Time: 1'01.2

Fastest lap
Driver	(New Zealand) Graham McRae	McRae-Chevrolet
- Time: 1'02.6

Podium
First	(New Zealand) Graham McRae	McRae-Chevrolet
Second	(Australia) John McCormack	Elfin-Repco Holden
Third	(Australia) Johnnie Walker	Lola-Repco Holden

The 1973 Australian Grand Prix was a race for Australian Formula 1 and Australian Formula 2 racing cars, the former class incorporating Formula 5000 cars. It was held on 4 November at Sandown and was the second AGP in a row to be held at that circuit.

It was the thirty eighth Australian Grand Prix and doubled as round four of the 1973 Australian Drivers' Championship. Defending winner Graham McRae won his second AGP ahead of John McCormack and Johnnie Walker.

== Classification ==
Results as follows:

== Qualifying ==
Pos	No.	Driver	Car	Entrant	Qual	Gap
1	3	(Australia) John McCormack	Elfin MR5 / Repco Holden 5.0L V8	Ansett Team Elfin	1:01.2	—
2	25	(Australia) Johnnie Walker	Lola T330 / Repco Holden 5.0L V8	John Waker Motor Racing	1:01.4	+0.2
3	5	(Australia) Kevin Bartlett	Lola T330 / Chevrolet 5.0L V8	Chesterfield Filter Racing	1:01.7	+0.5
4	1	(New Zealand) Graham McRae	McRae GM2 / Chevrolet 5.0L V8	Graham McRae	1:01.8	+0.6
5	6	(Australia) Max Stewart	Lola T330 / Chevrolet 5.0L V8	Seiko Service Centre	1:01.9	+0.7
6	14	(Australia) Howie Sangster	McLaren M18/M22 / Chevrolet 5.0L V8	Don O'Sullivan Racing Pty. Ltd.	1:03.7	+2.5
7	2	(Australia) Garrie Cooper	Elfin MR5 / Repco Holden 5.0L V8	Ansett Team Elfin	1:05.0	+3.8
8	16	(Australia) John Leffler	Elfin MR5 / Repco Holden 5.0L V8	Seiko Service Centre	1:05.1	+3.9
9	18	(Australia) Enno Buesselmann	Birrana 273 / Ford 1.6L I4	Bob & Marj Brown	1:09.2	+8.0
10	19	(Australia) Leo Geoghegan	Birrana 273 / Ford 1.6L I4	Grace Bros. Racing Team	1:10.6	+9.4
11	90	(Australia) Ken Hastings	Brabham BT36 / Ford 1.6L I4	B.B. Cameron	1:12.3	+11.1
12	31	(Australia) Alfredo Costanzo	Elfin Mono / Ford 1.6L I4	A. Costanzo	1:13.8	+12.6
13	38	(Australia) Chas Talbot	Elfin 600E / Ford 1.6L I4	Chas Talbot	1:14.8	+13.6

== Race ==
Pos	No.	Driver	Car	Entrant	Laps	Time
1	1	(New Zealand) Graham McRae	McRae GM2 / Chevrolet 5.0L V8	Graham McRae	52	57m 54.8s
2	3	(Australia) John McCormack	Elfin MR5 / Repco Holden 5.0L V8	Ansett Team Elfin	52	57m 56.5s
3	25	(Australia) Johnnie Walker	Lola T330 / Repco Holden 5.0L V8	John Waker Motor Racing	50	
4	14	(Australia) Howie Sangster	McLaren M18/M22 / Chevrolet 5.0L V8	Don O'Sullivan Racing Pty. Ltd.	50	
5	2	(Australia) Garrie Cooper	Elfin MR5 / Repco Holden 5.0L V8	Ansett Team Elfin	49	
6	16	(Australia) John Leffler	Elfin MR5 / Repco Holden 5.0L V8	Seiko Service Centre	49	
7	18	(Australia) Enno Buesselmann	Birrana 273 / Ford 1.6L 4cyl	Bob & Marj Brown	46	
8	90	(Australia) Ken Hastings	Brabham BT36 / Ford 1.6L 4cyl	B.B. Cameron	45	
9	5	(Australia) Kevin Bartlett	Lola T330 / Chevrolet 5.0L V8	Chesterfield Filter Racing	43	
10	31	(Australia) Alfredo Costanzo	Elfin Mono / Ford 1.6L I4	A. Costanzo	41	
NC	6	(Australia) Max Stewart	Lola T330 / Chevrolet 5.0L V8	Seiko Service Centre	31	
DNS	19	(Australia) Leo Geoghegan	Birrana 273 / Ford 1.6L 4cyl	Grace Bros. Racing Team		
DNS	38	(Australia) Chas Talbot	Elfin 600E / Ford 1.6L I4	Chas Talbot		

== Notes ==
- Pole position: John McCormack – 1'01.2
- Fastest lap: Graham McRae – 1'01.6

Preceded by 1972 Australian Grand Prix	Australian Grand Prix; 1973	Succeeded by 1974 Australian Grand Prix
