= 1938 Australian Grand Prix =

- Formula Libre handicap race

Race details
- Date: 18 April 1938
- Location: Mount Panorama Circuit, Bathurst, New South Wales
- Course: Temporary road circuit
- Course length: 6.12 km (3.84 miles)
- Distance: 40 laps, 244.8 km (153.6 miles)
- Weather: Sunny

Fastest lap
Driver	(United Kingdom) Peter Whitehead	ERA
- Time: 3m 23s

Podium
First	(United Kingdom) Peter Whitehead	ERA
Second	(Australia) Les Burrows	Terraplane Special
Third	(Australia) Alan Crago & John Sherwood	MG

The 1938 Australian Grand Prix was a motor race held at the Mount Panorama Circuit near Bathurst in New South Wales, Australia on 18 April 1938. It was staged over 40 laps of the six kilometre circuit for a total distance of 241 kilometres. The race, which was organised by the Light Car Club of New South Wales, attracted 38 entries, 30 of which started the race. 33,000 people paid for admission to the circuit on race day.

The race was the tenth Australian Grand Prix and the first to be held in New South Wales. It utilised the newly completed Mount Panorama Circuit, a dirt surface tourist drive which climbed and descended Mount Panorama in the Bald Hills to the south of the city of Bathurst. The Grand Prix was the feature race at the inaugural meeting at the rural New South Wales venue. With a circuit length of just over 3.8 miles it was the shortest circuit to host the Australian Grand Prix to this time.

The format of the race was the same as that used since the 1932 event. This utilised a handicap start with the slowest car starting first and other cars starting at intervals according to their predicted pace with the winner being the first car to complete the total race distance. The meeting was enlivened by two visiting British drivers, Peter Whitehead and Alan Sinclair who had brought with them supercharged racing machinery, respectively an ERA and an Alta. While Sinclair was unable to start the race, Whitehead did and it was quickly realised that his position as the scratch handicap competitor was too generous and by races end he had driven through the field. Whitehead's main opposition came from Les Burrows driving a 1933 Terraplane-based racing car. However Burrows slowed near the end, his engine reducing in power sufficiently to allow Whitehead to sweep by to take victory despite Burrows starting the race 15 minutes earlier. The MG TA driven by Alan Crago and John Sherwood placed third.

The initial release of official results attracted various protests and led to a recount, with some placings subsequently changed.

Whitehead was awarded the RAC of Australia Cup and £250 prizemoney for winning the race. He also received £100, the NRMA Trophy and the title of Australian Road Racing Champion for achieving the fastest time and the Courtney and Bohlsen Cup for setting the fastest lap.

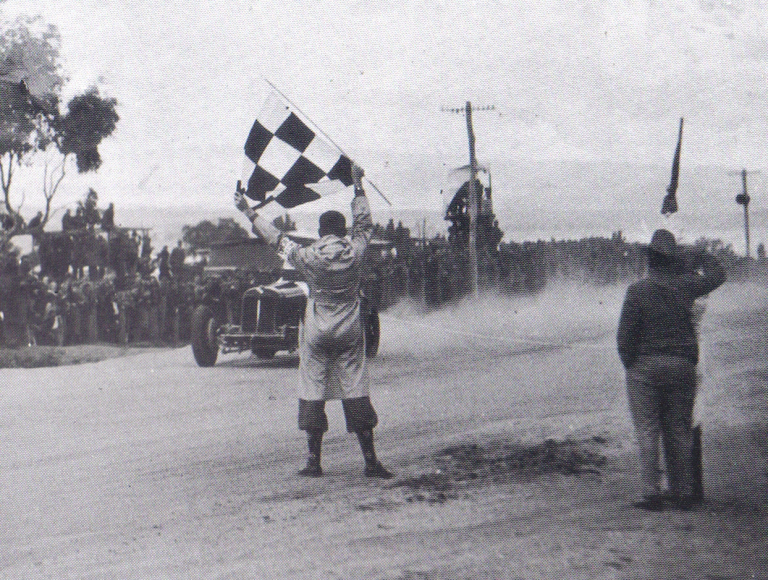
Peter Whitehead (ERA B Type) takes the flag to win the 1938 Australian Grand Prix

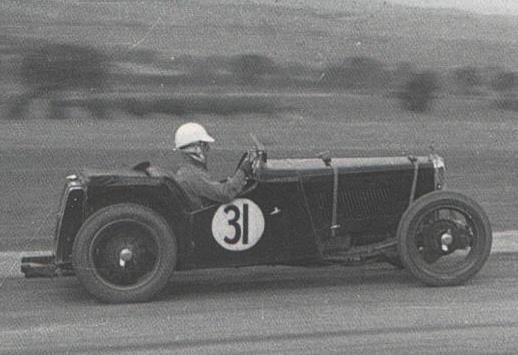
Alan Crago & John Sherwood placed third driving an MG TA

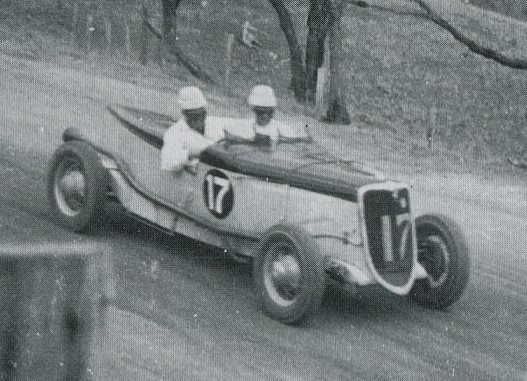
Jack Phillips placed sixth driving a Ford V8 Special

== Classification ==
Results as follows.

Pos	No.	Driver	Car / Engine	Entrant	Handicap	Laps	Time
1	1	(United Kingdom) Peter Whitehead	ERA B Type / ERA s/c 1.5L	P.N. Whitehead	Scratch	40	2h 46m 50s
2	22	(Australia) Les Burrows	Terraplane Special / Terraplane 2.6L	L. Burrows	15 mins	40	2h 48m 21s
3	31	(Australia) Alan Crago (Australia) John Sherwood	MG TA / MG 1.3L	F.A. Crago	26 mins	40	2h 49m 20s
4	3	(Australia) Tom Peters	Bugatti Type 37A / Ford s/c 2.9L	T. Peters	4 mins	40	2h 50m 19s
5	32	(Australia) John Crouch	MG TA / MG 1.3L	J.F. Crouch	26 mins	40	2h 51m 38s
6	17	(Australia) Jack Phillips	Ford Special / Ford 3.6L	J.K. Phillips	13 mins	40	2h 52m 28s
7	20	(Australia) Charles Whatmore	Ford Special / Ford 3.6L	C. Whatmore	14 mins	40	2h 52m 56s
8	39	(Australia) Ron Uffindell	Austin 7 Special / Austin 0.7L	R.G. Uffindell	34 mins	40	2h 55m 07s
9	37	(Australia) Les Murphy	MG PB / MG 0.8L	J.H. O'Dea	30 mins	40	3h 02m 40s
10	15	(Australia) George Bonser	Terraplane Special / Terraplane 3.5L	G. Bonser junior	12 mins	40	2h 56m 47s
11	18	(Australia) Bob Lea-Wright	Terraplane Special / Terraplane 3.5L	R.A. Lea-Wright	13 mins	40	2h 58m 01s
12	38	(Australia) Colin Anderson	Morris Cowley / Morris 1.7L	A.I Barrett	30 mins	40	2h 57m 47s
13	19	(Australia) D. Kerr	Ford Special / Ford 3.6L	D. Kerr	14 mins	40	2h 59m 59s
14	16	(Australia) Harry Beith	Terraplane Special / Terraplane 3.5L	H.J. Beith	13 mins	40	3h 05m 19s
15	12	(Australia) George Martin	BMW 328 / BMW 2.0L	G.C. Martin	7 mins	40	
16	14	(Australia) Barney Dentry	Riley Special / Riley 1.1L	G.B. Dentry	12 mins	40	
Ret	21	(Australia) Paul Burton	Alvis / Alvis s/c 1.5L	P.H. Burton	14 mins		
Ret	30	(Australia) Jack Boughton	Morgan 4/4 / Coventry Climax 1.1L	J.S. Boughton	24 mins		
Ret	5	(Australia) Jim Fagan	MG K3 / MG s/c 1.1L	J.H. Fagan	6 mins	31	
Ret	36	(Australia) John Pike	Singer 9 / Singer 1.0L	J.E. Pike	30 mins		
Ret	35	(Australia) Arthur Beasley	Singer 9 / Singer 1.0L	A. Beasley	28 mins		
Ret	23	(Australia) Fred Foss	Ford Special / Ford 3.6L	F.J. Foss	17 mins		
Ret	33	(Australia) R. Keir	MG TA / MG 1.3L	R.C. Keir	26 mins		
Ret	9	(Australia) Tim Joshua	Frazer Nash / Gough 1.5L	C.M. Joshua	7 mins		
Ret	24	(Australia) C. Williamson	Chrysler Special / Chrysler 4.2L	C. Williamson	17 mins		
Ret	11	(Australia) George Reed	Ford Special / Ford 3.6L	N.F. Aubin	7 mins		
Ret	2	(Australia) Frank Kleinig	Kleinig-Hudson 8 Special / Hudson 4.2L	W.A. McIntyre	4 mins	5	
Ret	26	(Australia) Reg Sevil	Singer / Singer 1.5L	R.B. Sevil	22 mins	4	
Ret	34	(Australia) George Thame	Riley Nine Imp / Riley 1.1L	G.J. Thame	5 mins	3	
Ret	25	(Australia) Alf Barrett	Lombard AL3 / Lombard 1.2L	A.I Barrett	28 mins	2	
DNS	8	(Australia) Wally James	Frazer Nash / Ford 2.9L	W. James	7 mins		
DNS	4	(Australia) Colin Dunne	MG K3 / MG s/c 1.1L	C.A. Dunne	5 mins		
DNS	6	(Australia) Lyster Jackson	MG K3 / MG s/c 1.1L	L. Jackson	6 mins		
DNS	7	(United Kingdom) Alan Sinclair	Alta / Alta s/c 1.1L	A.J. Sinclair	6 mins		
DNS	10	(Australia) John Barraclough	Alfa Romeo 6C 1750 SS / Alfa Romeo s/c 1.8L	J.A. Barraclough	7 mins		
DNS	27	(Australia) John Sherwood	MG NE / MG 1.3L	J.O. Sherwood	22 mins		
DNS	28	(Australia) John Summers	MG Magna / MG 1.1L	J.H. Summers	24 mins		
DNS	29	(Australia) C. Frederick	MG Magnette Special / MG 1.3L	C. Frederick	24 mins		

Preceded by 1937 Australian Grand Prix	Australian Grand Prix; 1938	Succeeded by 1939 Australian Grand Prix
