= 1959 Australian Drivers' Championship =

Australian Drivers' Championship

Seasons
- ← 1958 1960 →

The 1959 Australian Drivers Championship was a CAMS sanctioned motor racing title for drivers of Formula Libre cars. The championship winner was awarded the 1959 CAMS Gold Star.

The series was won by Victorian racer Len Lukey driving his Cooper T45 Climax and in the opening round of the series his own much modified Cooper T23 which was known as the Lukey-Bristol. Lukey was one of only a few drivers who attempted to complete the gruelling twelve race schedule, the longest in ADC history. Lukey finished just two points ahead of his season long rival, Alec Mildren from the ACT (Cooper-Climax). Stan Jones was third in the championship, using four different cars over the course of the series. Race victories were shared around with Mildren taking three wins. Lukey, Jones and Bill Patterson each took two wins, with single victories going to Jack Brabham, Bib Stillwell and New Zealand Maserati 250F racer Ross Jensen.

== Calendar ==
The title, which was the third Australian Drivers' Championship, was contested over a twelve race series.

Race	Date	Race	Circuit	Location	Winner
1	26 January	South Pacific Championship	Gnoo Blas Motor Racing Circuit	Orange, New South Wales	Jack Brabham*
2	22 February	Victorian Trophy	Fisherman's Bend	Melbourne, Victoria	Alec Mildren
3	2 March	Australian Grand Prix	Longford Circuit	Longford, Tasmania	Stan Jones
4	28 March	South Australian Trophy	Port Wakefield Circuit	Port Wakefield, South Australia	Stan Jones
5	30 March	Bathurst 100	Mount Panorama Circuit	Bathurst, New South Wales	Ross Jensen*
6	14 June	Lowood Trophy	Lowood Airfield Circuit	Lowood, Queensland	Alec Mildren
7	30 August	Queensland Centenary Road Race Championship	Lowood Airfield Circuit	Lowood, Queensland	Alec Mildren
8	4 October	New South Wales Road Race Championship	Mount Panorama Circuit	Bathurst, New South Wales	Bib Stillwell
9	12 October	The Advertiser Trophy	Port Wakefield Circuit	Port Wakefield, South Australia	Bill Patterson
10	24 October	Western Australian Road Race Championship	Caversham	Caversham, Western Australia	Len Lukey
11	22 November	Western Port Cup	Phillip Island Grand Prix Circuit	Phillip Island, Victoria	Bill Patterson
12	13 December	Phillip Island Trophy	Phillip Island Grand Prix Circuit	Phillip Island, Victoria	Len Lukey

- Winning driver not awarded points for races 1 and 5

== Points ==
Championship points were awarded on a 12-7-5-3-2-1 basis to the first six Australian drivers at each race, irrespective of actual race placings gained. Only the best nine race results could be retained by each driver.

As only Australian resident drivers were eligible, South Pacific Championship winner Jack Brabham and Bathurst 100 winner Ross Jensen were not awarded points towards the championship.

== Results ==
Position	Driver	Car	Entrant	GB	FB	Lon	PW	MP	Low	Low	MP	PW	Cav	PI	PI	Total
1	Len Lukey	Lukey Bristol & Cooper T45 Coventry Climax	Lukey Mufflers Pty Ltd	5	3	7	7	12	-	7	3	-	12	(3)	12	68
2	Alec Mildren	Cooper T43 Coventry Climax & Cooper T45 Coventry Climax	A.G. Mildren Pty Ltd	3	12	3	-	-	12	12	5	(3)	5	7	7	66
3	Stan Jones	Maybach Mk.IV Corvette; Maserati 250F; Cooper T51 Coventry Climax; Sabakat Coventry Climax	Stan Jones Motors Pty. Ltd.	-	7	12	12	-	5	-	-	-	7	1	-	44
4	Bill Patterson	Cooper T43 Coventry Climax	Bill Patterson Motors P/L	-	-	-	-	-	7	2	-	12	-	12	-	33
5	Arnold Glass	Ferrari 555 Super Squalo; Maserati 250F	A.J. Glass	7	-	5	-	7	3	-	-	-	-	-	-	22
6	Doug Whiteford	Maserati 300S	D. Whiteford	12	5	-	-	1	-	-	-	-	-	-	-	18
7	Bib Stillwell	Cooper T51 Coventry Climax	B.S. Stillwell	-	-	-	-	-	-	5	12	-	-	-	-	17
8	Keith Rilstone	Zephyr Special	K. Rilstone	-	-	-	5	-	-	-	-	7	-	2	-	14
9	Ted Grey	Tornado Mk.II Corvette	L. Abrahams	-	-	-	-	-	-	-	7	-	-	-	-	7
10	Austin Miller	Cooper T51 Coventry Climax	Superior Cars	-	-	-	-	-	-	1	-	-	-	-	5	6
11	Jack Myers	WM Special	J. Myers	-	-	-	-	5	-	-	-	-	-	-	-	5
=	David McKay	Cooper T51 Coventry Climax	Victa Pty Ltd	-	-	-	-	-	-	-	-	5	-	-	-	5
=	Noel Hall	Cooper T51 Coventry Climax	O. Hall	-	-	-	-	-	-	-	-	-	-	5	-	5
=	Murray Trenberth	Alta F2 Holden	M. Trenberth	-	-	-	3	-	-	-	-	2	-	-	-	5
15	Ray Wamsley	Alfa Romeo Tipo B Chevrolet Corvette	R. Wamsley	-	-	-	-	3	-	-	-	-	-	-	-	3
=	Frank Matich	Jaguar D-Type	Leaton Motors	-	-	-	-	-	-	3	-	-	-	-	-	3
=	Syd Negus	Cooper T20 Holden	Syd Negus	-	-	-	-	-	-	-	-	-	3	-	-	3
=	Murray Carter	Corvette Special	Murray Carter Motors	-	-	-	-	-	-	-	-	-	-	-	3	3
19	Alwyn Rose	Dal Ro Special	A.J. Rose	2	-	-	-	-	-	-	-	-	-	-	-	2
=	John Lanyon	MG TC Special	J. Lanyon	-	2	-	-	-	-	-	-	-	-	-	-	2
=	Alan Jack	Cooper T39 Coventry Climax	A. Jack	-	-	2	-	-	-	-	-	-	-	-	-	2
=	Jim Goldfinch	Austin-Healey 100S	J. Goldfinch	-	-	-	2	-	-	-	-	-	-	-	-	2
=	Werner Greve	HWM Jaguar	W. Greve	-	-	-	-	2	-	-	-	-	-	-	-	2
=	Arthur Griffiths	Ferrari 555 Super Squalo	A. Griffith	-	-	-	-	-	2	-	-	-	-	-	-	2
=	David Finch	Jaguar D-Type	D. Finch	-	-	-	-	-	-	-	2	-	-	-	-	2
=	Peter Bond	Bondley Special	P. Bond	-	-	-	-	-	-	-	-	-	2	-	-	2
=	John Roxburgh	Cooper T41 Coventry Climax	Kingbridge Service	-	-	-	-	-	-	-	-	-	-	-	2	2
=	Glyn Scott	Cooper T43 Coventry Climax	Glyn Scott Motors	-	-	-	-	-	1	-	1	-	-	-	-	2
29	Barry Collerson	Talbot-Lago T26C	B. Collerson	1	-	-	-	-	-	-	-	-	-	-	-	1
=	Ron Phillips	Cooper T38 Jaguar	R. Phillips	-	-	1	-	-	-	-	-	-	-	-	-	1
=	Tom Stevens	MG TA Special	T. Stevens	-	-	-	1	-	-	-	-	-	-	-	-	1
=	Syd Taylor	TS Special	S Taylor	-	-	-	-	-	-	-	-	-	1	-	-	1
