= 1959 Bathurst 100 =

Layout of the Mount Panorama Circuit (1938-1986)

The 1959 Bathurst 100 was a motor race staged at the Mount Panorama Circuit, Bathurst, New South Wales, Australia on 30 March 1959. The race, which was promoted by the Australian Racing Drivers Club Ltd., was contested over 26 laps, a total distance of 100 miles. It was race 5 of 12 in the 1959 Australian Drivers' Championship.

The race was won by New Zealander Ross Jensen driving a Maserati 250F.

== Results ==
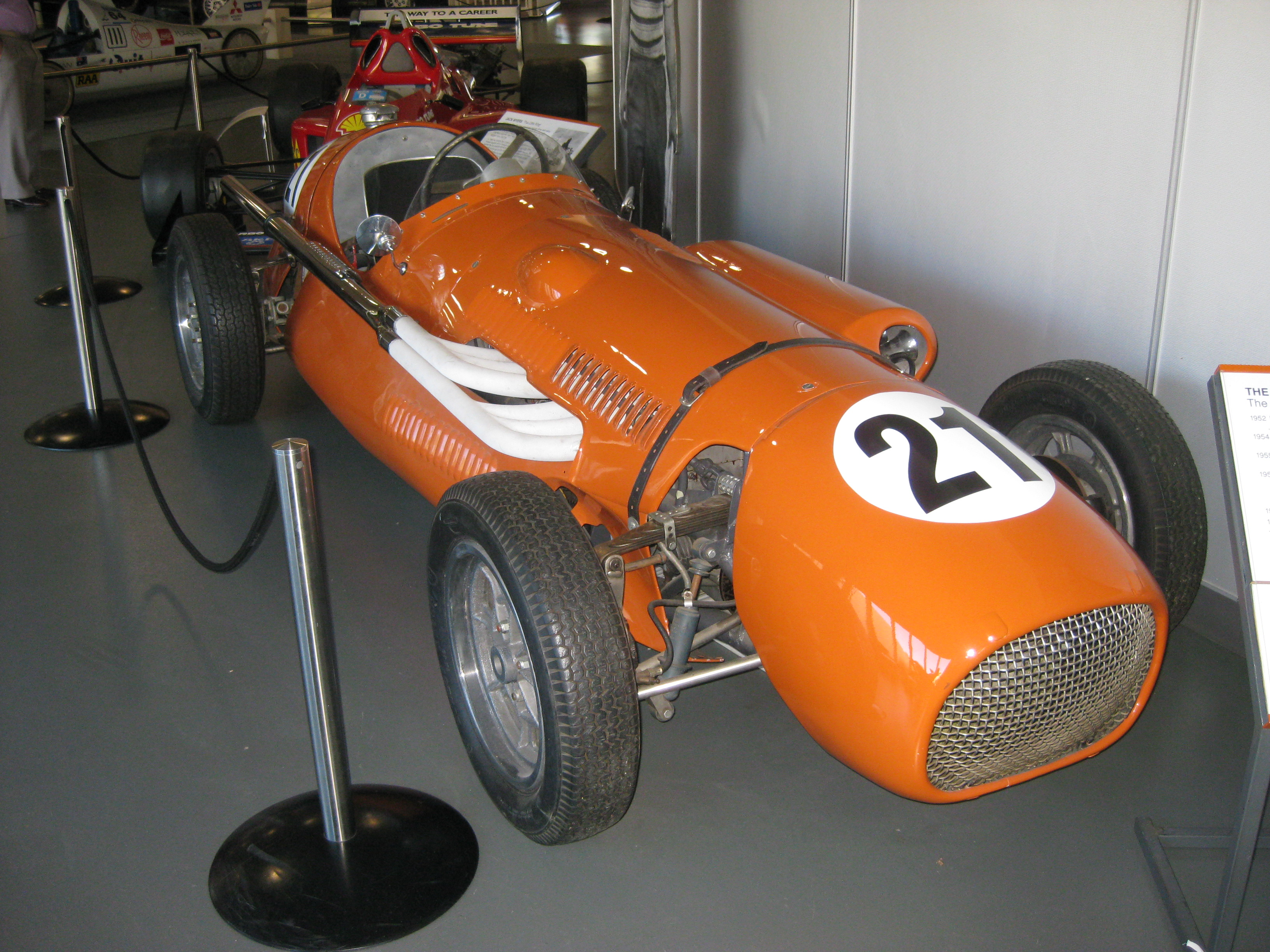
The WM Special which was driven into fourth place by Jack Myers. The car is pictured in 2010.

Position	Driver	No.	Car	Entrant	Time / laps
1	Ross Jensen	18	Maserati 250F	R. Jensen	12:38.0
2	Len Lukey	5	Cooper T45 Coventry Climax	Lukey Mufflers Pty Ltd	12:21.0
3	Arnold Glass	7	Maserati 250F	Capitol Motors	12:47.0
4	Jack Myers	3	WM Special Holden	J. Myers	24
5	Ray Wamsley	19	Alfa Romeo Tipo B Corvette	R. Wamsley	24
6	Werner Grieve	113	HWM Jaguar	W. Grieve	24
7	Doug Whiteford	16	Maserati 300S	D. Whiteford	23
8	Frank Walters	41	SoCal Special Mercury	F. Walters	23
9	Noel Barnes	40	MG TC Special	N. F. Barnes	20
10	Alwyn Rose	28	Dalro Jaguar	A. C. Rose	20
11	Bill Clarke	63	Berkeley SE492 Excelsior	Auto Imports Pty Ltd	15
DNF	Alec Mildren	10	Cooper T45 Coventry Climax FPE	A.G. Mildren Pty Ltd	17
DNF	Jesse Griffith	36	Maserati 4CL	P. Lovett	14
DNF	Lionel Ayers	12	Cooper Mk.IV MG s/c	L. Ayers	13
DNF	Leon Thomas	35	MG Special s/c	John Bruderlin & Leon Thomas	13
DNF	Glyn Scott	26	Repco Holden Special	Glyn Scott Motors	9
DNF	Bob Larkin	88	Lotus Mk.6 Coventry Climax FWA	New Age Service Station	9
DNF	Geoff McClelland	67	Mac-Vincent	G. McClelland	9
DNF	Max Williams	132	MG TC	M. Williams	8
DNF	Clive Adams	8	Prad Sports Alta	C. Adams	7
DNF	Stan Jones	1	Maserati 250F	Stan Jones Motors Pty. Ltd.	6
DNF	Bill Cooke	48	Peugeot Special	W. Cooke	6
DNF	Curley Brydon	9	Ferrari Type 125 Corvette	A. H. Brydon	5
DNF	Ern Tadgell	58	Sabakat Coventry Climax FPF	C. E. Tadgell	3
DNF	John Schroder	62	Nota Consul	J. Schroder	3
DNF	Bill Reynolds	56	Orlando MG	Robin Orlando	1
DNF	Bruce Leer	33	MG TC	B. Leer	0
DNS	Arnold Glass	2	Ferrari Super Squalo	Capitol Motors	-
DNS	Gordon Stewart	11	Stewart MG s/c	Ecurie Cinque	-
DNS	Barry Collerson	15	Talbot-Lago T26C	B. Collerson	-
DNS	Paul Samuels	17	MG TC Austin	Moss Bros. Retreads	-
DNS	G. T. Wilson	23	RVM Riley	G. T. Wilson	-
DNS	Roy Williams	27	Sheerline Special Austin	R. Williams	-
DNS	Bill Patterson	29	Cooper T43 Coventry Climax	Bill Patterson Motors P/L	-
DNS	Warren Grace	43	MG Special s/c	W. Grace	-
DNS	Allan Ferguson	45	Isk MG Holden	A. Ferguson	-
DNS	Geoff Thorne	47	Citroen Special	G. Thorne	-
DNS	Noel Hall	71	Ralt Vincent	N. Hall	-
DNS	John Schroder	163	Healey Silverstone Riley	Town & Country Garage Pty Ltd	-

- DNF = Did not finish
- DNS = Did not start

== Notes ==
- Fastest lap: Alec Mildren (Cooper), 2:48.9
