= 1958 Australian Drivers' Championship =

Motor racing competition

Seasons
- ← 1957 1959 →

The 1958 Australian Drivers' Championship was a CAMS sanctioned Australian motor racing competition for drivers of Formula Libre cars. It was the second Australian Drivers' Championship. The title was contested over a nine race series with the winner awarded the 1958 CAMS Gold Star.

The championship was won by Stan Jones, driving a Maserati 250F.

== Calendar ==
Rd.	Date	Race	Circuit	Location	Winning driver	Winning car
1	27 January	South Pacific Championship for Racing Cars	Gnoo Blas Motor Racing Circuit	Orange, New South Wales	Jack Brabham*	Cooper T43 Coventry Climax
2	23 February	Victorian Trophy Race	Fisherman's Bend	Melbourne, Victoria	Stan Jones	Maserati 250F
3	3 March	Longford Trophy	Longford Circuit	Longford, Tasmania	Ted Gray	Tornado Mk.II Corvette
4	5 April	South Australian Trophy Race	Port Wakefield Circuit	Port Wakefield, South Australia	Len Lukey	Cooper T23 MkII Bristol
5	15 June	Queensland Road Racing Championship	Lowood Airfield Circuit	Lowood, Queensland	Alec Mildren	Cooper T43 Coventry Climax FPE
6	31 August	Lowood Trophy	Lowood Airfield Circuit	Lowood, Queensland	Alec Mildren	Cooper T43 Coventry Climax FPE
7	23 October	Australian Grand Prix	Mount Panorama Circuit	Bathurst, New South Wales	Lex Davison	Ferrari 500/625/750
8	30 November	Melbourne Grand Prix	Albert Park Circuit	Melbourne, Victoria	Stirling Moss*	Cooper T43 Coventry Climax FPF
9	26 December	Phillip Island Trophy Race	Phillip Island Grand Prix Circuit	Phillip Island, Victoria	Stan Jones	Maserati 250F

- Winning driver not awarded points for races 1 and 8

== Points structure ==
Championship points were awarded on an 8-5-3-2-1 basis to the top five finishers in each race. However, as overseas drivers were ineligible to qualify for championship points, no points were awarded for placings scored by these drivers. Similarly drivers of sports cars which on occasion raced amongst the Formula Libre cars, were not eligible for points, although Doug Whiteford's Maserati 300S appears to have been an exception.

== Results ==
Position	Driver	Car	Entrant	G.B.	F.B.	Lon.	P.W.	Low.	Low.	M.P.	A.P.	P.I.	Total
1	Stan Jones	Maserati 250F	S. F. Jones; Stan Jones Motors Pty. Ltd.	5	8	5	-	-	5	-	-	8	31
2	Alec Mildren	Cooper T43 Coventry Climax FPE	A. Mildren Motors; A. G. Mildren Pty Ltd	1	1	-	-	8	8	-	-	5	23
3	Len Lukey	Cooper T23 MkII Bristol; Lukey Bristol; Vauxhall Special	Lukey Mufflers Pty Ltd; W. F. Coad	3	2	1	8	3	3	-	1	-	21
4	Ted Gray	Tornado Mk.II Corvette	E. Gray	-	-	8	-	5	-	-	-	-	13
5	Arnold Glass	Ferrari 555 Super Squalo	A. J. Glass	-	5	3	-	-	-	-	-	-	8
5	Doug Whiteford	Maserati 300S	D. Whiteford	-	3	2	-	-	-	-	3	-	8
5	Lex Davison	Ferrari 500/625/750	Ecurie Australie	-	-	-	-	-	-	8	-	-	8
8	Austin Miller	Cooper T41 Coventry Climax FWB	A. Miller	-	-	-	5	-	-	-	-	2	7
9	Ern Seeliger	Maybach Mk. IV Corvette	Stan Jones Motors Pty. Ltd.	-	-	-	-	-	-	5	-	-	5
10	Tom Hawkes	Cooper T23 MkII Repco Holden	Ecurie Corio	-	-	-	1	-	-	3	-	-	4
11	Keith Rilstone	Zephyr Special Ford	K. Rilstone	-	-	-	3	-	-	-	-	-	3
11	John Roxburgh	Cooper T41 Coventry Climax	J. B. Roxburgh	-	-	-	-	-	-	-	-	3	3
13	Greg McEwin	MacHealey Austin-Healey	G. McEwin	-	-	-	2	-	-	-	-	-	2
13	Bib Stillwell	Maserati 250F	B.S. Stillwell	-	-	-	-	-	-	-	2	-	2
15	Glyn Scott	Repco Holden Special	Glyn Scott Motors	-	-	-	-	1	-	-	-	-	1
15	Arthur Griffiths	Cooper T41 Coventry Climax FWB	A. Griffith	-	-	-	-	-	1	-	-	-	1
15	Curly Brydon	Ferrari 125 Corvette	A.H. Brydon	-	-	-	-	-	-	1	-	-	1
15	Ray Gibbs	Cooper T23 Holden	Sabina Motors	-	-	-	-	-	-	-	-	1	1

Championship points were not awarded for the following:

- Jack Brabham (Cooper T43 Climax) : First place in Race 1
- Bill Pitt (Jaguar D-Type) : Fourth place in Race 1
- Bill Pitt (Jaguar D-Type) : Fourth place in Race 5
- Bill Pitt (Jaguar D-Type) : Fourth place in Race 6
- Merv Neil (Cooper T45 Climax) : Fourth place in Race 7
- Stirling Moss (Cooper T45 Climax) : First place in Race 8
- Jack Brabham (Cooper T45 Climax) : Second place in Race 8
