= 1955 Australian Grand Prix =

- Formula Libre race

Race details
- Date: 10 October 1955
- Location: Port Wakefield, South Australia
- Course: Permanent racing facility
- Course length: 2.09 km (1.3 miles)
- Distance: 80 laps, 167.3 km (104 miles)
- Weather: Sunny

Pole position
Driver	(Australia) Reg Hunt	Maserati

Fastest lap
Driver	(Australia) Jack Brabham (Australia) Reg Hunt	Cooper-Bristol; Maserati
- Time: 1'03

Podium
First	(Australia) Jack Brabham	Cooper-Bristol
Second	(Australia) Reg Hunt	Maserati
Third	(Australia) Doug Whiteford	Talbot-Lago

The 1955 Australian Grand Prix was a motor race held at the Port Wakefield Circuit in South Australia on 10 October 1955. The race, which had 22 starters, was held over 80 laps of the 2.09 km (1.3 mi) circuit. It was open to Formula Libre cars of unlimited capacity. The race was promoted by Brooklyn Speedway (SA) Ltd. and was organised by the Sporting Car Club of SA Inc.

It was the twentieth Australian Grand Prix and the first to be held on a purpose built motor racing circuit after the previous 19 were held on closed streets or country roads, or on airfields modified for the purpose. Future World Champion Jack Brabham won his first Australian Grand Prix in a streamlined Cooper-Bristol that he had assembled himself at the Cooper factory and sent to Australia. It was the first time a rear-engined car had won the AGP, although this was seen as an upset win and a rear-engined car would not win again until 1960.

== Classification ==
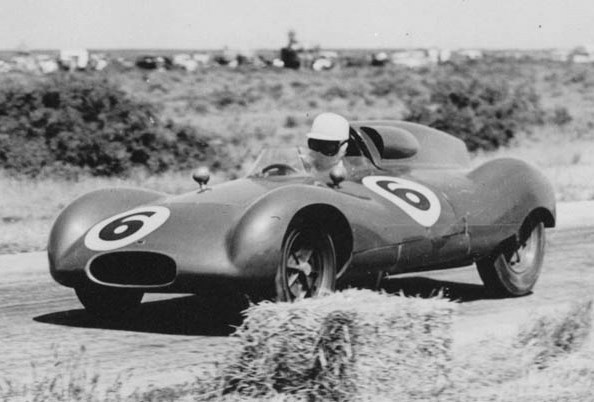
Jack Brabham won the race driving a Cooper T40 Bristol

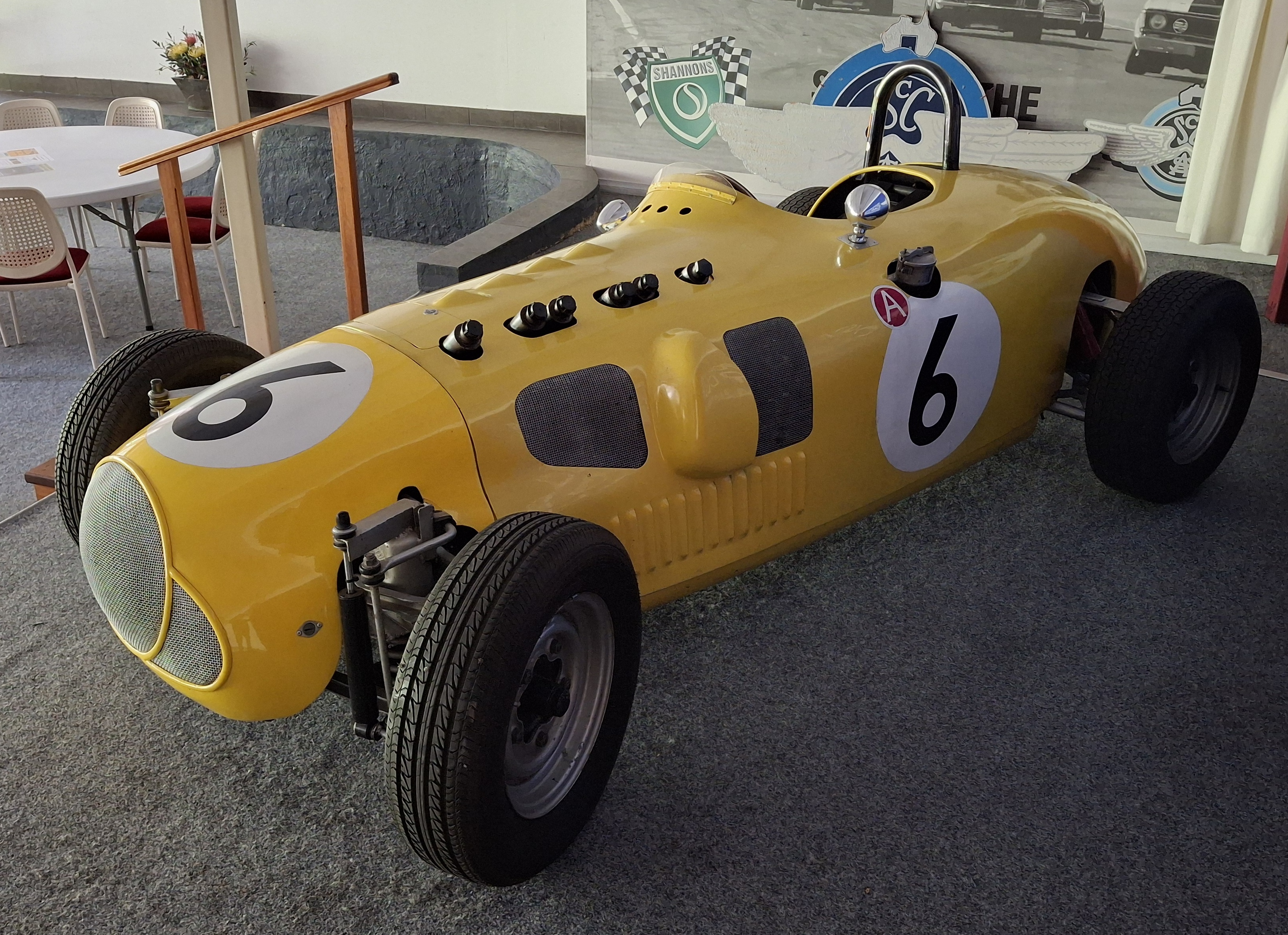
Eldred Norman place eighth driving the Eclipse Zephyr. The car is pictured in 2024.

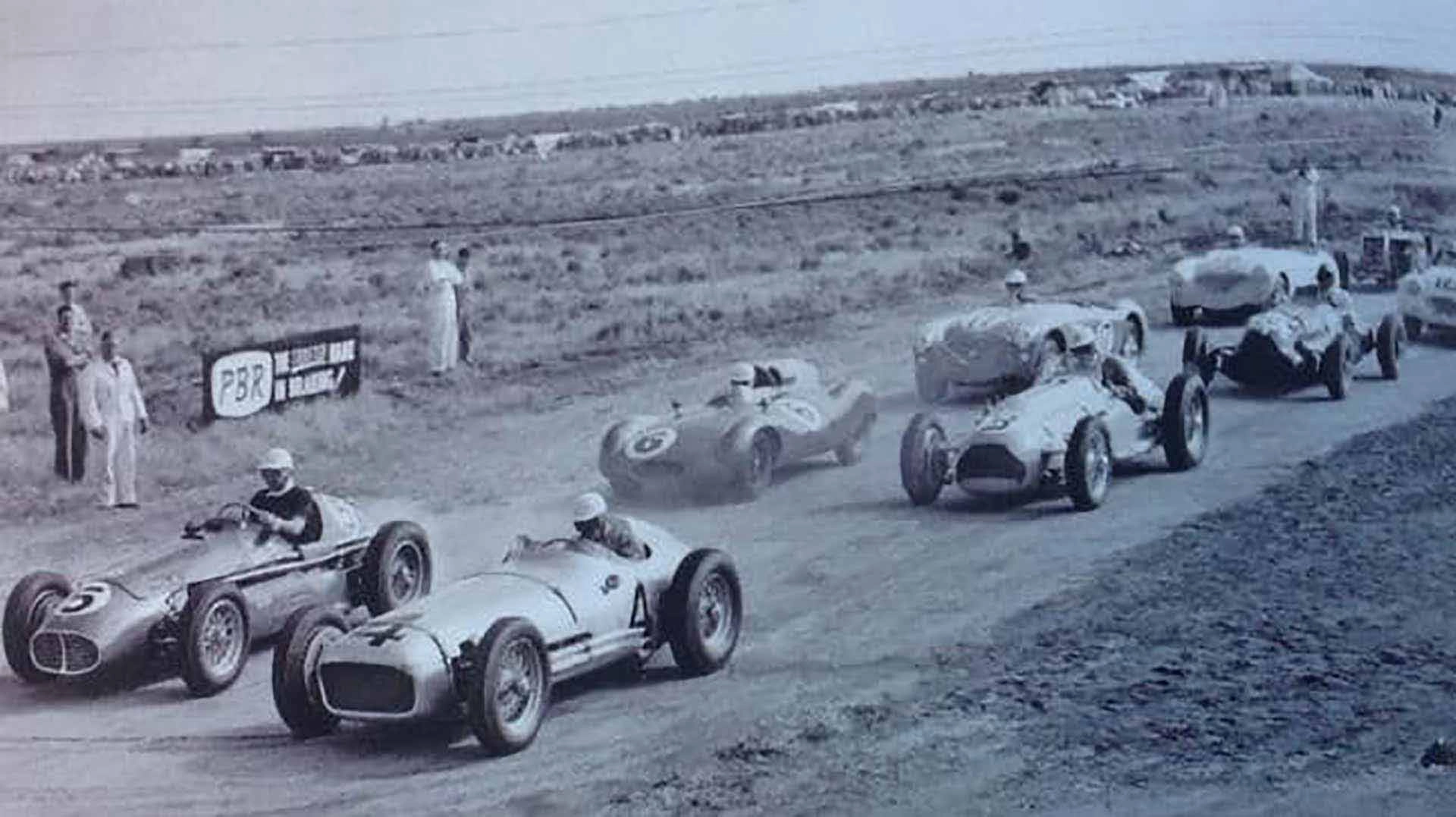
Start of the Third Qualifying Heat of the 1955 Australian Grand Prix. The #5 Maserati A6GCM driven by Reg Hunt and the #4 Maybach Special Mk.3 driven by Stan Jones are on the front row.

Results as follows.

Pos	No.	Driver	Car	Entrant	Laps	Time / Remarks
1	6	(Australia) Jack Brabham	Cooper T40 / Bristol 2.0L	J. Brabham	80	1h 26m 44.43s
2	5	(Australia) Reg Hunt	Maserati A6GCM / Maserati 2.5L	R.H. Hunt	80	1h 26m 47.54s
3	3	(Australia) Doug Whiteford	Talbot-Lago T26C / Talbot-Lago 4.5L	D. Whiteford	80	1h 26m 48.92s
4	10	(Australia) Kevin Neal	Cooper T23 / Bristol 2.0L	R.H. Hunt	78	
5	12	(Australia) Murray Trenberth	Vincent Special / Vincent 1.0L	M. Trenberth	76	
6	16	(Australia) Keith Rilstone	Rilstone Special / Vincent 1.0L	G.T. Harrison	75	
7	14	(Australia) Bill Craig	Alta / Holden 2.4L	W.J. Craig	75	
8	2	(Australia) Eldred Norman	Eclipse Zephyr / Ford s/c 2.3L	E. Norman & Eclipse Motors Pty. Ltd.	75	
9	20	(Australia) Bill Wilcox	Ford V8 Special / Ford 4.4L	W. Wilcox	74	
10	17	(Australia) Greg McEwin	Austin-Healey 100 / Austin-Healey 2.7L	Invicta Motors Ltd.	71	
11	30	(Australia) Jack Johnson	MG TC Special / MG 1.3L	J. Johnson	69	
12	7	(Australia) Charlie Whatmore	Jaguar Special / Jaguar 3.4L	C. Whatmore	68	
13	27	(Australia) Bob Burnett Read	MG K3 / MG 1.1L	E.R. Burnett Read	67	
14	29	(Australia) Steve Tillet	MG TC / MG 1.4L	S.D. Tillett	66	
15	21	(Australia) C.F. Norris	AC Ace / AC 2.0L	C.F. Norris	64	
Ret	8	(Australia) Tom Hawkes	Cooper T23 / Bristol 2.0L	T.V. Hawkes	76	Fuel supply
Ret	18	(Australia) Clem Smith	Austin-Healey 100 / Austin-Healey 2.7L	C. Smith	65	Suspension
Ret	4	(Australia) Stan Jones	Maybach Mk. 3 / Maybach 3.8L	S.J. Jones	43	Clutch
Ret	9	(Australia) Stan Coffey	Cooper T20 / Bristol 2.0L	Mrs J. Coffey	38	Accident
Ret	26	(Australia) Bruce Walton	Walton / JAP 0.5L	B.A. Walton	31	
Ret	25	(Australia) Murray Rainey	Cooper Mk.IX / Norton 0.5L	M. Rainey	14	Universal joint
Ret	23	(Australia) Bill Patterson	Cooper Mk.V / JAP 0.5L	G.W. Patterson	14	Engine
DNQ	35	(Australia) John Cummins	Bugatti Type 37 / Holden 2.2L	J. Cummins	-	

== Notes ==
- Pole position: Reg Hunt
- Fastest lap: Jack Brabham/Reg Hunt - 1'03
- Number of starters: 22

Preceded by 1954 Australian Grand Prix	Australian Grand Prix; 1955	Succeeded by 1956 Australian Grand Prix
