= 1954 Australian Grand Prix =

Coordinates: 27.9673°S 153.4141°E

- Formula Libre race

Race details
- Date: 7 November 1954
- Location: Southport Road Circuit, Southport, Queensland
- Course: Temporary road circuit
- Course length: 9.17 km (5.7 miles)
- Distance: 27 laps, 247.6 km (153.9 miles)
- Weather: Sunny

Pole position
Driver	Rex Taylor	Talbot-Lago

Fastest lap
Driver	(Australia) Dick Cobden	Ferrari
- Time: 3'52

Podium
First	(Australia) Lex Davison	HWM-Jaguar
Second	(Australia) Curley Brydon	MG Special
Third	(Australia) Ken Richardson	Ford Special

The 1954 Australian Grand Prix was a motor race held at the Southport Road Circuit near Southport in Queensland, Australia on 7 November 1954. The race was held over 27 laps of the 5.7 mile (9.17 kilometre) circuit, a total distance of 153.9 miles (247.6 km). It was the nineteenth Australian Grand Prix and the second to be held in Queensland. With no suitable permanent circuit available, a course was mapped out on roads in sparsely settled coastal land 2.5 km south west of Southport, and just to the north of later circuits, Surfers Paradise Raceway and the Surfers Paradise Street Circuit. The Grand Prix race meeting was organised by the Queensland Motor Sporting Club and the Toowoomba Auto Club in conjunction with the Southport Rotary Club. The race, which was open to Racing and Stripped Sports Cars, had 28 starters.

The race was won by Lex Davison, later to become the most successful driver in the history of the Australian Grand Prix. It was Davison's first win in the Grand Prix having finished in the top three as far back as 1947. Davison drove a Formula 2 HWM re-engined with a 3.4 litre Jaguar engine. Davison finished a lap clear of Curley Brydon's MG TC special and two laps ahead of third placed Ken Richardson in a Ford based special. The gaps were caused by attrition amongst the fastest drivers. Jack Brabham was out on the second lap with a broken engine in his Cooper; Rex Taylor was black flagged for receiving outside assistance after spinning his Lago-Talbot; Dick Cobden retired his Ferrari after a spin and Stan Jones crashed heavily while leading after the chassis of his Maybach Special failed. It would be the last race for Maybach Mk.II, with Charlie Dean's team rebuilding it as Maybach Mk.III.

== Classification ==
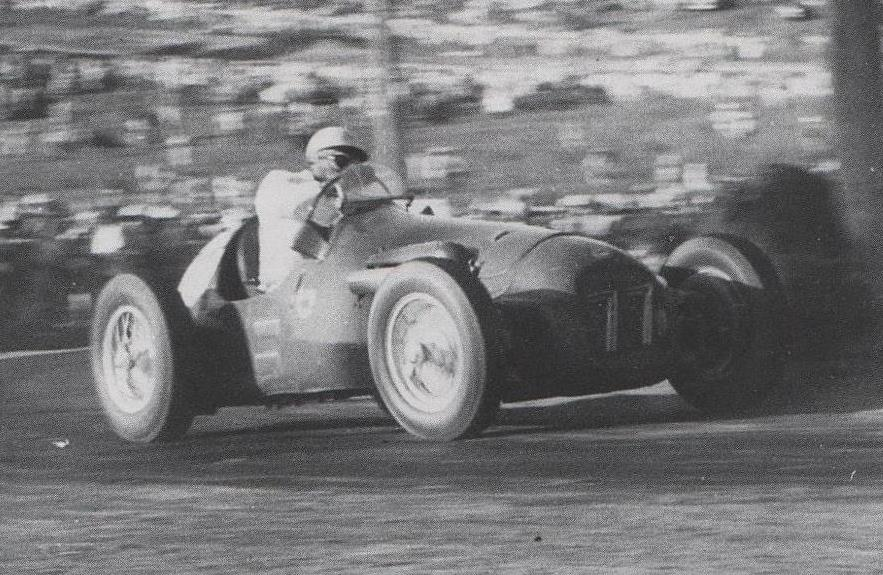
Race winner Lex Davison (HWM Jaguar) contesting the 1954 Australian Grand Prix

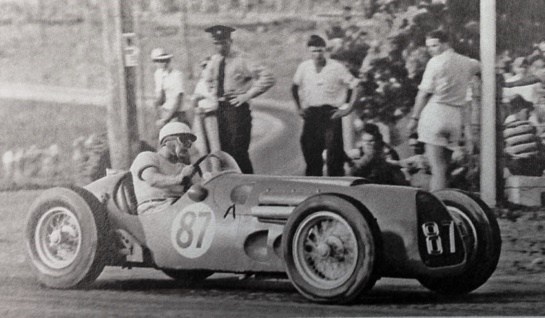
Stan Jones (Maybach Special) led for 13 laps prior to crashing out of the race.

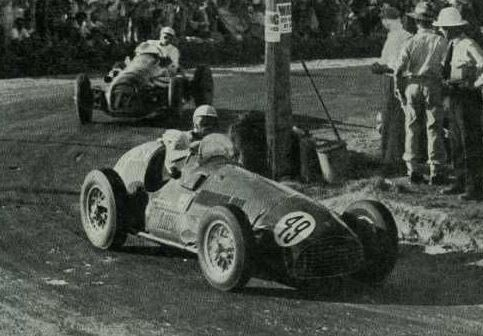
Dick Cobden (Ferrari 125) set the fastest lap of the race but did not finish.

Results as follows.

Pos	No.	Driver	Car	Entrant	Laps	Time / Remarks
1	77	(Australia) Lex Davison	HWM F2 / Jaguar 3.4L	A.N. Davison	27	1h 50m 18s
2	43	(Australia) Curley Brydon	MG TC Special / MG s/c 1.3L	H. Brydon	26	
3	9	(Australia) Ken Richardson	Ford V8 Special / Ford 3.9L	K.B. Richardson	25	
4	8	(Australia) Eldred Norman	Triumph TR2 / Standard s/c 2.0L	E. deB. Norman	24	
5	31	(Australia) David Griffiths	Triumph TR2 / Standard 2.0L	D. P. Griffiths	24	
6	29	(Australia) Frank Tobin	Rizzo Riley Special / Riley 1.5L	Frank Tobin	23	
7	4	(Australia) Charlie Whatmore	Jaguar Special / Jaguar 3.4L	Chas. Whatmore	23	
8	46	(Australia) Stan Coffey	Cooper T20 / Bristol 2.0L	S.F. Coffey	23	
9	10	(Australia) Owen Bailey	MG Holden Special / Holden 2.4L	O. Bailey	23	
10	2	(Australia) Charlie Swinburne	Cooper Mk.IV / Norton 0.5L	C. Swinburne	23	
11	21	(Australia) Bill Pitt	Jaguar XK120 Special / Jaguar 3.4L	J. C. Anderson	22	
12	1	(New Zealand) Fred Zambucka	Maserati 8CM / Maserati 3.0L	F. Zambucka	22	
Ret	16	(Australia) Snow Sefton	Ford V8 Special / Ford 4.2L	Snow Sefton	21	Black flag
Ret	14	(Australia) Noel Barnes	MG TC Special / MG 1.3L	N. F. Barnes	19	Overheating
Ret	92	(Australia) Doug Whiteford	Ford V8 Special / Ford 4.4L	D. Whiteford	17	Blocked jet
Ret	79	(Australia) Arthur Griffiths	Wylie Javelin / Jowett s/c 1.5L	A. Griffiths	15	Head gasket
Ret	87	(Australia) Stan Jones	Maybach Special Mk.II / Maybach 4.3L	S.J. Jones	13	Crashed
Ret	15	(Australia) John McKinney	MG TC Special / MG 1.3L	J. McKinney	11	Fire
Ret	74	(Australia) Ian Mountain	Peugeot Special / Peugeot 1.5L	I. Mountain	11	Overheating
Ret	49	(Australia) Dick Cobden	Ferrari 125 / Ferrari s/c 2.0L	R. Cobden	10	Crashed
Ret	3	(Australia) Wal Anderson	Holden Special / Holden 2.3L	W. S. Anderson	9	Seized oil pump
Ret	56	(Australia) Jack Murray	Allard J2 / Cadillac 5.3L	J.E. Murray	8	
Ret	23	(Australia) Gerald Downing	Riley Imp Special / Riley	G. J. Downing	8	Overheating
Ret	78	(Australia) Rex Taylor	Talbot-Lago T26C / Talbot-Lago 4.5L	R. Taylor	6	Black flag
Ret	37	(Australia) Holt Binnie	MG TD Special / MG 1.4L	Martin Motors	6	
Ret	20	(Australia) Gordon Greig	Austin-Healey 100 / Austin-Healey 2.7L	G. Greig	4	Valve
Ret	86	(Australia) Bill Wilcox	Ford V8 Special / Ford 4.0L	W. Wilcox	3	
Ret	6	(Australia) Jack Brabham	Cooper T23 / Bristol 2.0L	Jack Brabham	1	Engine
DNS	28	(Australia) Frank Kleinig	Hudson Special	F. Kleinig	-	Battery
DNS	12	(Australia) Alec Mildren	Riley Special	A. G. Mildren	-	Oil cooler

- Pole position: Rex Taylor (Allocated by the race organisers prior to the event)
- Winner's average speed: 83.7 mph (134.7 km/h)
- Fastest lap: Dick Cobden (Ferrari), 3:52s, 88.45 mph, 142.3 km/h
- Attendance: More than 60,000

Preceded by 1953 Australian Grand Prix	Australian Grand Prix; 1954	Succeeded by 1955 Australian Grand Prix
