= 1958 Melbourne Grand Prix =

Formula libre motor race held at Australia (1958)

The 1958 Melbourne Grand Prix was a motor race for Formula Libre Racing Cars and Sports Cars by invitation. The race was staged at the Albert Park Circuit in Victoria, Australia on 30 November 1958 over 32 laps, a distance of 100 miles (161 km). It was race 8 of 9 in the 1958 Australian Drivers' Championship.

The race was won by Stirling Moss driving a Cooper T45 for RRC Walker.

== Results ==
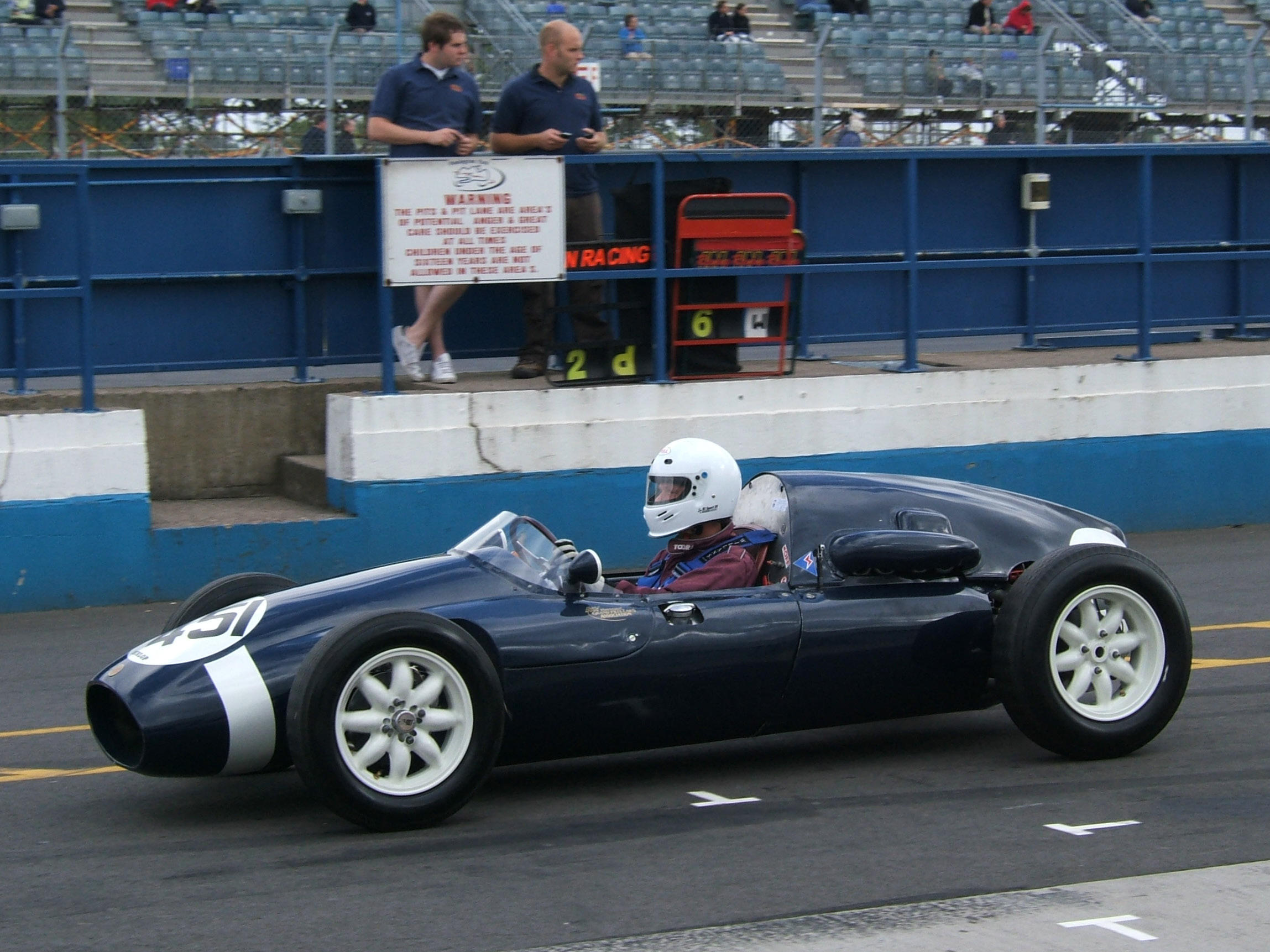
Stirling Moss won the race driving a Cooper T45, similar to the example pictured above

Position	Driver	No.	Car	Entrant	Laps
1	Stirling Moss	7	Cooper T45 Coventry Climax FPF	RRC Walker	32
2	Jack Brabham	8	Cooper T45 Coventry Climax FPF	J Brabham	32
3	Doug Whiteford	26	Maserati 300S	D Whiteford	31
4	Bib Stillwell	3	Maserati 250F	BS Stillwell	31
5	Len Lukey	5	Lukey Bristol	Lukey Mufflers Pty Ltd	30
6	Bill Pitt	22	Jaguar D-Type	G Anderson	30
7	Curley Brydon	6	Ferrari Type 125 Chevrolet Corvette	AH Brydon	29
8	Glyn Scott	18	Repco Holden Special	G Scott	29
9	Bob Jane	27	Maserati 300S	New York Motors Pty Ltd	29
10	Tom Clarke	10	Ferrari 555	T Clarke	28
11	John Roxburgh	19	Cooper T41 Coventry Climax FWB	JB Roxburgh	28
DNF	Derek Jolly	29	Lotus XV Coventry Climax	D Jolly	28
DNF	Stan Jones	12	Maserati 250F	Stan Jones Motors Pty Ltd	18
DNF	Austin Miller	60	Miller Special Coventry Climax FWB	A Miller	12
DNF	Ted Gray	11	Tornado Mk.II Chevrolet Corvette	L Abrahams	4
DNF	Arnold Glass	2	Ferrari 555	Capital Motors	4
DNF	Jack Myers	17	WM Special Waggott Holden	J Myers	1
DNF	Owen Bailey	20	Talbot-Lago T26C	O Bailey	1
DNF	Alec Mildren	15	Cooper T43 Coventry Climax FPE	AG Mildren Pty Ltd	0
DNS	Bill Patterson	9	Cooper T43 Coventry Climax	Bill Patterson Motors Pty Ltd	-
DNS	Ray Gibbs	25	Cooper T23 Holden	Sabina Motors Pty. Ltd.	-
DNS	Werner Greve	30	HWM Jaguar	W Greve	-
DNS	Ray Wamsley	21	Alfa Romeo Tipo B Chevrolet Corvette	R Wamsley	-
DNS	Charlie Whatmore	28	Lotus XI Coventry Climax FPF	C Whatmore	-
DNS	John Marston	23	Cooper Mk.IV Vincent s/c	J Marston	-
DNS	Ern Seeliger	4	Maybach Mk.IV Chevrolet Corvette	E Seeliger	-

Notes:

- Winner's average speed: 98.86 mph
- Fastest lap: Stirling Moss, 1m 50s (102.27 mph), all time outright lap record
