= 1959 Australian Grand Prix =

- Race 3 of 12 in 1959 Australian Drivers' Championship
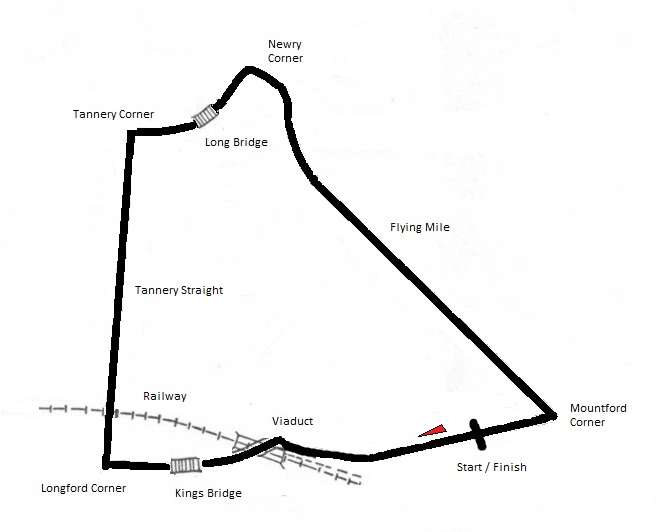

Race details
- Date: 2 March 1959
- Location: Longford Circuit, Longford, Tasmania
- Course: Temporary road circuit
- Course length: 7.242 km (4.501 miles)
- Distance: 25 laps, 175 km (110 miles)
- Weather: Sunny

Pole position
Driver	(Australia) Stan Jones	Maserati

Fastest lap
Driver	(Australia) Arnold Glass	Maserati
- Time: 2'27

Podium
First	(Australia) Stan Jones	Maserati
Second	(Australia) Len Lukey	Cooper-Climax
Third	(Australia) Arnold Glass	Maserati

The 1959 Australian Grand Prix was a Formula Libre motor race held at the Longford Circuit in Tasmania, Australia on 2 March 1959.

The race, which had 13 starters, was the twenty fourth Australian Grand Prix and the third race of the 1959 Australian Drivers' Championship. Stan Jones won his only AGP, breaking through after years of trying with the Maybach series of specials to win in his Maserati 250F, in what would be the last Australian Grand Prix victory for a front-engined car.

The grid for the Grand Prix was determined by race times set in two qualifying races on the Saturday prior to the main race. The first heat was won by Doug Whiteford from Arnold Glass and Bill Patterson. The second heat was won by Jones in a race time almost 20 seconds shorter than Whiteford's, giving him the pole position, from Len Lukey and Alec Mildren.

== Classification ==
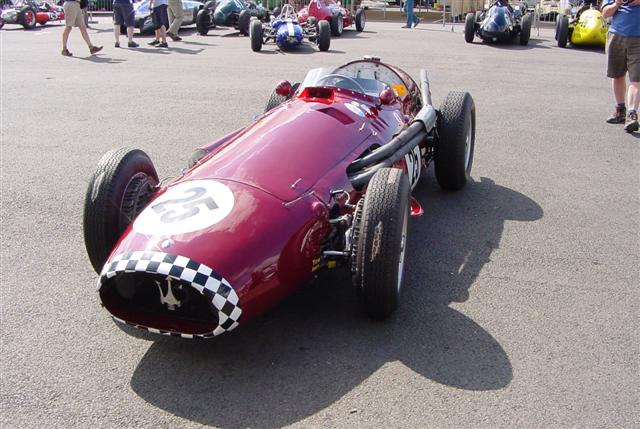
A Maserati 250F, similar to the car driven to victory in the 1959 Australian Grand Prix by Stan Jones

Results as follows.

Pos	No.	Driver	Car	Entrant	Laps	Time
1	1	(Australia) Stan Jones	Maserati 250F / Maserati 2.5L	Stan Jones Motors Pty. Ltd.	25	1h 11m 44s
2	5	(Australia) Len Lukey	Cooper T45 / Climax FPE 2.0L	Lukey Mufflers Pty. Ltd.	25	1h 11m 46s
3	7	(Australia) Arnold Glass	Maserati 250F / Maserati 2.5L	Capitol Motors	25	1h 13m 21s
4	4	(Australia) Alec Mildren	Cooper T43 / Climax FPF 2.0L	A. G. Mildren Pty. Ltd.	25	1h 13m 50s
5	6	(Australia) Alan Jack	Cooper T39 / Climax FPE 1.5L	Byfield Motors	21	
6	14	(Australia) Lyn Archer	Cooper T39 / Climax 1.1L	Ecurie van Diemen	20	
Ret	74	(Australia) Max Stephens	Cooper T40 / Bristol 2.0L	Max Stephens' Palm Grove Car Centre	18	
Ret	56	(Australia) Ron Phillips	Cooper T38 / Jaguar 3.8L	J. & R. Phillips	13	
Ret	19	(Australia) John Roxburgh	Cooper T41 / Climax 1.5L	Kingsbridge Service	13	
Ret	60	(Australia) Austin Miller	Miller Special / Climax FWB 1.5L	Victorian Amateur Drivers Club Inc.	8	
Ret	3	(Australia) Ted Gray	Tornado Mk.II / Chevrolet 4.6L	Lou Abrahams	4	
Ret	44	(Australia) John Lanyon	MG TC Special / MG 1.3L S/c	Victorian Amateur Drivers Club Inc.	0	
Ret	26	(Australia) Doug Whiteford	Maserati 300S / Maserati 3.0L	Doug Whiteford	0	
DNS	75	(Australia) Bill Patterson	Cooper T43 / Climax FPF 1.8L	Bill Patterson Motors Pty. Ltd.		
DNQ	55	(Australia) John Youl	Wylie Javelin / Jowett 1.5L S/c	John C. Youl		

== Notes ==
- Attendance: estimated in excess of 30,000 on both days
- Pole position: Stan Jones – fastest heat time of 17m 18s
- Starters: 13
- Fastest lap: Arnold Glass – 2'27 (97.01 mph, 156.09 km/h), new record
- Fastest Eighth: Arnold Glass – 157.9 mph

Preceded by 1958 Australian Grand Prix	Australian Grand Prix; 1959	Succeeded by 1960 Australian Grand Prix
