= 1950 New Zealand Grand Prix =

- 1st New Zealand Grand Prix
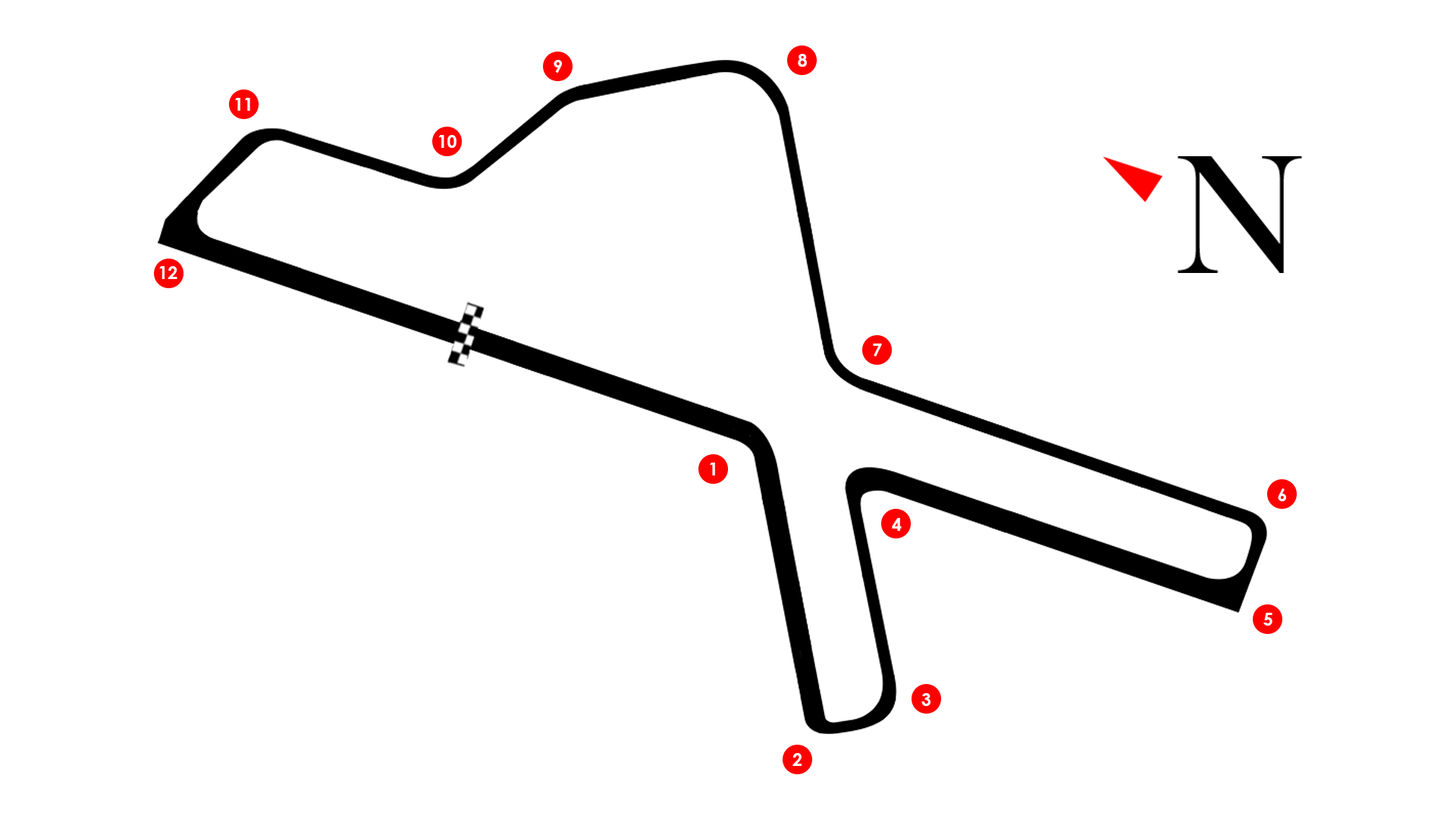

Race details
- Date: 18 March 1950
- Location: Ohakea Circuit, Palmerston North, New Zealand
- Course: Temporary racing facility
- Course length: 5.8 km (3.6 miles)
- Distance: 30 laps, 174 km (108 miles)
- Weather: Sunny

Pole position
Driver	(Australia) Garry Coglan	MG TC Special

Fastest lap
Driver	(New Zealand) Laurie Powell	V8 Special
- Time: 3:10.0

Podium
First	(New Zealand) John McMillan	Jackson Special
Second	(New Zealand) Hec Green	Wolseley Special
Third	(New Zealand) Fordy Farland	Singer-Buick

The 1950 New Zealand Grand Prix was a motor race held at the Ohakea Circuit on 18 March 1950. It was the first New Zealand Grand Prix to be held, was held to Formula Libre rules and was run by the Manuwatu Car Club.

The event was won by John McMillan driving a Jackson Special who was followed in close pursuit by Hec Green. The field consisted largely of local drivers with the only exception being Australian driver Garry Coglan who secured the pole position. Following this event, the New Zealand Grand Prix would lie dormant for three years before returning in 1954.

== Classification ==
Pos	No.	Driver	Car	Laps	Time
1	10	(New Zealand) John McMillan	Jackson Special / Ford 3919cc V8	30	1hr 41min 40sec
2	13	(New Zealand) Hec Green	Wolseley Special / Wolseley 1604cc 6cyl	30	+ 1.0
3		(New Zealand) Fordy Farland	Singer-Buick / Buick 4074cc 8cyl	30	+ 2:45.0
4	23	(New Zealand) Bill Lee	Cooper Mk II / JAP 497cc 1cyl	30	+ 3:26.0
5		(New Zealand) Halsey Logan	Logan Special / Singer 972cc 4cyl	29	+ 1 lap
6	7	(New Zealand) Pat Hoare	RA II / Vauxhall 1442cc 4cyl	27	+ 3 laps
7	19	(New Zealand) Jack Kennedy	Austin 7 Special / Austin 747cc 4cyl s/c	24	+ 6 laps
8		(New Zealand) Bill Cope	Austin 7 Ulster / Austin 747cc 4cyl s/c	24	+ 6 laps
Ret	9	(New Zealand) George Smith	V8 Chevrolet / Ford 3622cc V8	24	Engine
Ret	8	(New Zealand) Hec McLean	Invicta S / Meadows 4467cc 6cyl	23	Fuel Supply
Ret		(New Zealand) Ewen Faulkner	Ford-Morris / Ford 3622cc V8	15	Battery
Ret		(New Zealand) Laurie Powell	V8 Special / Ford 3622cc V8	14	Engine
Ret		(New Zealand) Gordon Brown	V8 Chevrolet / Ford 3622cc V8	13	Axle
Ret		(New Zealand) Morrie Proctor	Riley Nine / Riley 1098cc 4cyl	8	Engine
Ret	6	(New Zealand) Don Ransley	Ransley-Riley / Riley 1826cc 6cyl	8	Engine
Ret		(New Zealand) Fred Zambucka	DeSoto Special / DeSoto 4099cc 6cyl	6	Engine
Ret		(New Zealand) Bryce Clinkard	Ansaldo Special / Ansaldo 1991cc 6cyl	5	Engine
Ret		(New Zealand) Ken Hamus	Bugatti Type 35A / Bugatti 1991cc 8cyl	3	Gearbox
DNS		(Australia) Garry Coglan	MG TC Special / MG 1250cc 4cyl s/c		Engine
DNA	1	(New Zealand) Ron Roycroft	Austin 7 / Austin 747cc 4cyl s/c		Did Not Attend
DNA		(New Zealand) Jack Tutton	Allard L-Type / Ford 3622cc V8		Did Not Attend
DNA		(New Zealand) Peter Harrison	MG Tiger / MG 2468cc 6cyl		Did Not Attend

Sporting positions
Preceded by none	New Zealand Grand Prix; 1950	Succeeded by 1954 New Zealand Grand Prix
