= 1954 Bathurst 100 =

Historical motor racing event (Australia)

Layout of the Mount Panorama Circuit (1938–1986)

The 1954 Bathurst 100 was a motor race held at the Mount Panorama Circuit, Bathurst, New South Wales, Australia on 19 April 1954. It was staged over 26 laps of the 3.7 mile circuit, a total distance of approximately 100 miles. The race, which was open to 'racing cars of all powers', was contested on a handicap basis with the first car, the HRG of Eddie Senior, starting 17 minutes and 46 seconds before the last cars, the Maybach of Stan Jones and the Ferrari of Dick Cobden.

The race was won by Bill Clark driving a HRG, with the Scratch section (disregarding handicaps) won by Stan Jones driving a Maybach.

== Race results ==
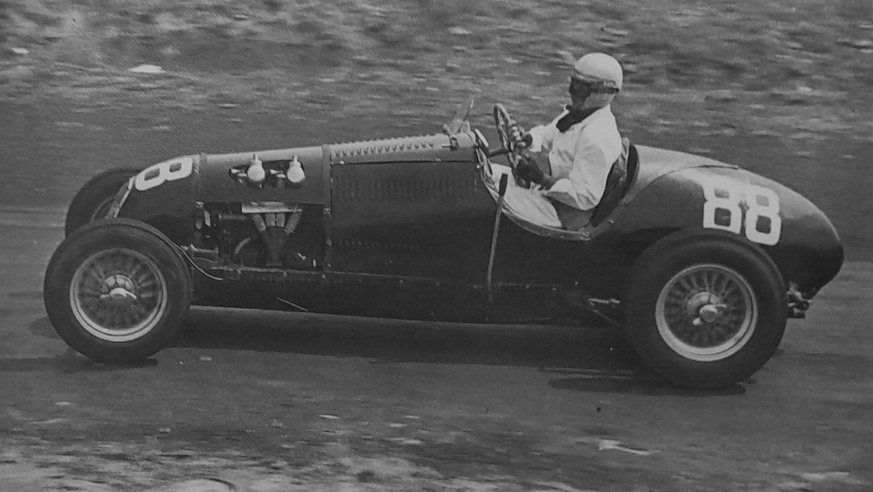
Race winner Bill Clark (HRG), contesting the 1954 Bathurst 100

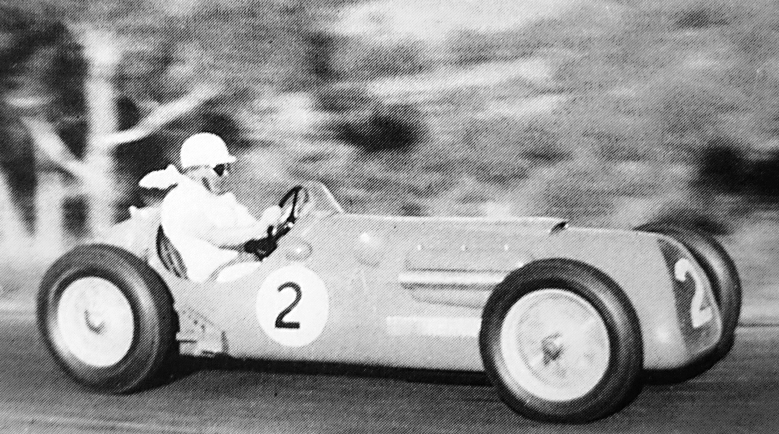
Stan Jones (Maybach) placed third and won the Scratch section

Position	Driver	No.	Car	Handicap	Race time	Scratch section	Time
1	Bill Clark	88	HRG	5.12	94.15	8	89.03
2	Jack Brabham	1	Cooper Bristol	16.28	95.13	2	78.45
3	Stan Jones	2	Maybach	17.46	95.45	1	77.59
4	John Nind	32	MG TB Special	5.12	97.33		
5	Dick Cobden	3	Ferrari Type 125	17.46	97.58	3	80.12
6	Ray Fowler	52	MG TC/J2 Special	9.32	98.07	6	88.12
7	Jack Murray	30	Bugatti Ford	13.26	98.25	4	84.01
8	Jack Robinson	20	Jaguar Special	11.42	99.17	5	87.15
9	Stan Coffey	4	Cooper Bristol	16.28	105.05	7	88.37
?	Frank Waters	35	SoCal V8 Special	6.04			
DNF	Bill Ford	54	Hudson Special	10.24			
DNF	Jim Madsen	7	Cooper 1100	13.26			
DNF	Larry Humphries	18	Austral Union	11.42			
DNF	Lex Davison	5	HWM Jaguar	16.28			
DNF	George Pearce	16	Cooper 1100	13.26			
DNF	Col James	79	MG TC Special	9.32			
DNF	Kevin Clement	80	Tobin V8 Special	6.04			
DNF	Bill Shipway	50	Cooper 500	6.04			
DNF	Tom Griffiths	72	Nutbug (Bugatti Ford)	5.28			
DNF	Frank Dynon	81	MG TB Special	5.12			
DNF	Eddie Senior	91	HRG	0.00			

- Organiser: Australian Racing Drivers Club
- Attendance: more than 18,000
- Entries: 25
- Starters: 21
- Non-starters: 4
- Winner's average speed: 67.4 mph
- Fastest time: Stan Jones, 77 minutes 59 seconds (77.2 mph average speed)
