= 1954 New Zealand Grand Prix =

- 2nd New Zealand Grand Prix
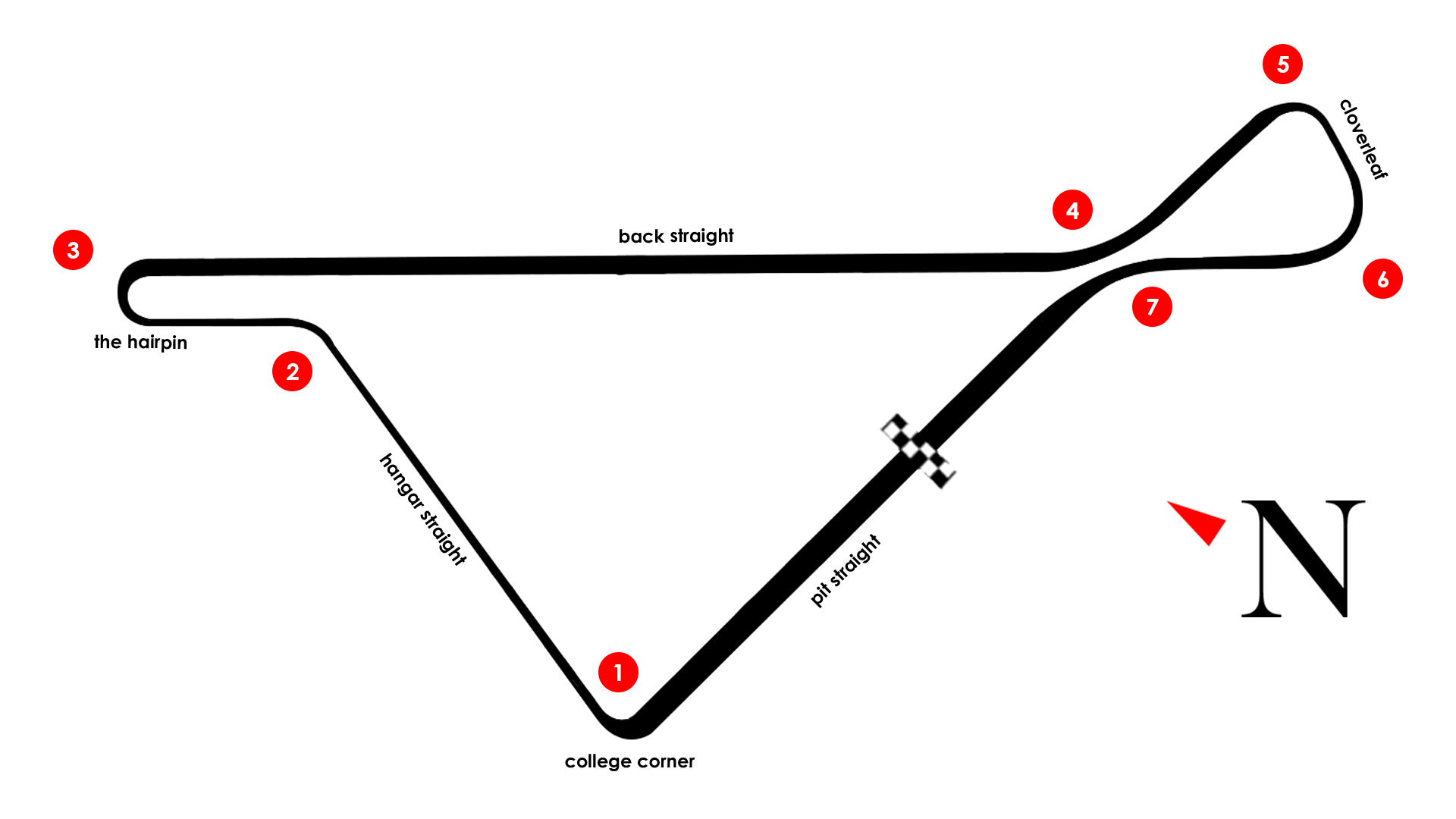

Race details
- Date: 9 January 1954
- Location: Ardmore Circuit, Auckland, New Zealand
- Course: Temporary racing facility
- Course length: 3.2 km (2.0 miles)
- Distance: 100 laps, 300 km (186 miles)
- Weather: Overcast / Light rain

Pole position
Driver	(United Kingdom) Ken Wharton	BRM P15

Fastest lap
Driver	(United Kingdom) Ken Wharton	BRM P15
- Time: 1:34.0

Podium
First	(Australia) Stan Jones	Maybach Special
Second	(United Kingdom) Ken Wharton	BRM P15
Third	(Australia) Tony Gaze	HWM

The 1954 New Zealand Grand Prix was a motor race held at the Ardmore Circuit on 9 January 1954. This was the first New Zealand Grand Prix since 1950 and the second overall. This was also the first New Zealand Grand Prix to be held at the Ardmore Circuit, a venue that would be used for the Grand Prix until 1962.

The Grand Prix was won by Australian Stan Jones, driving the Maybach Special in a spectacular drive over Britain's Ken Wharton and fellow Australian, Tony Gaze. The result came in the midst of controversy after Horace Gould claimed to have finished ahead of Jones. Subsequent investigations and protests culminated in Gould being classified fourth.

== Race report ==
Despite looming rain clouds overhead, 70,000 spectators descended upon the Ardmore Circuit to witness Auckland's first hosting of the New Zealand Grand Prix marquee event. This would also be the first time the event would be held to international standards, and as such, a handful of international drivers made their way over to the nation to compete. The event was run to Formula Libre rules. Thus, the entrants were an array of different types of cars.

In the first day of practice, some of the faster cars were spinning out regularly at the west end of the circuit. A last-minute modification to the track layout was made before race day to compensate for this and lap times were brought down significantly. Peter Whitehead set the pace early on with Stan Jones regularly joining him at the top of the timesheets in his Maybach. However, on the second day of practice, Jones' encountered engine troubles and was forced to scour the city of Auckland to find replacement parts to allow him to race. Working around the clock to complete the job, Jones' car was finally repaired a matter of hours before the start of the race.

Whitehead shot away into an early lead but the sheer power of Ken Wharton's BRM led to the two Briton's exchanging the lead. Tony Gaze and Ron Roycroft came into the pits at the end of the first lap but were quick to venture back out onto the track. On lap 13, the first major calamity of the race occurred when Whitehead spun his Ferrari, clouted a marker drum and stalled. The marshals assisted him back into the race, but would soon retire from the race altogether when his clutch completely disintegrated and threw components into the cockpit which resulted in Whitehead receiving a cut above his eye.

When Wharton pitted on lap 45, Jones would briefly assume the lead. The indomitable BRM would soon scythe back past him within five laps. However, Wharton's car soon began to omit smoke under brakes. Pitting again to diagnose the issue, it was determined that the lead to his front brake discs had fractured. The front leads were sealed off by the mechanics and Wharton was left to complete the race with only his rear brakes. Jones was now leading the race but Wharton, having worked his way back into second place, began to eat into his lead again. As the laps whittled down, Wharton drew closer and closer. Ultimately, Jones held on to take a valiant win after initial fears he may not have been able to race at all owing to car troubles. A disappointed Wharton came home in second with Gaze rounding out the top three in what was a good day for the Australian drivers. However, controversy was soon to follow.

Horace Gould would claim to have had completed 101 laps and that he had finished first, ahead of Jones. When Gould's protest was entered and upheld by the stewards (moving Gould from fourth to second), Wharton and Gaze subsequently protested against Gould, which led to an investigation as to where Gould had actually finished. It was discovered that while Gould did indeed complete 101 laps, his finishing time for 100 laps (race distance) still left him classified as being in fourth. Gould withdrew any further complaint and the original result remained.

== Classification ==
Pos	No.	Driver	Car	Laps	Time
1	7	(Australia) Stan Jones	Maybach Special / Maybach 3800cc 6cyl	100	2hr 45min 20.0sec
2	1	(United Kingdom) Ken Wharton	BRM P15 / BRM 1496cc V16 s/c	100	2hr 45min 13.3sec
3		(Australia) Tony Gaze	HWM / Alta 1972cc 4cyl	100	2hr 46min 22.3sec
4	5	(United Kingdom) Horace Gould	Cooper T23 / Bristol 1971cc 6cyl	100	2hr 45min 16.0sec
5		(New Zealand) Ron Roycroft	Alfa Romeo Tipo B / Alfa Romeo 2905cc 8cyl s/c	100	2hr 48min 49.0sec
6	9	(Australia) Jack Brabham	Cooper T23 / Bristol 1971cc 6cyl	100	2hr 54min 52.5sec
7		(New Zealand) Ross Jensen	Austin-Healey 100 / Austin 2660cc 4cyl		
8		(New Zealand) Arnold Stafford (New Zealand) Ron Frost	Cooper Mk VII / Norton 498cc 1cyl		
9		(New Zealand) Bill Lee	Cooper Mk VI / JAP 497cc 1cyl		
10		(New Zealand) Peter Harrison	Cooper Mk II / JAP 1098cc V2		
11	11	(New Zealand) Fred Zambucka	Maserati 8CM / Maserati 2992cc 8cyl s/c		
12		(New Zealand) David Crozier	Austin-Healey 100 / Austin 2660cc 4cyl		
13		(New Zealand) Keith Roper	Austin-Healey 100 / Austin 2660cc 4cyl		
14		(New Zealand) Phil Neill	FSS Special / Ford 3400cc V8		
Ret		(New Zealand) Ray Archibald	Jaguar XK120 / Jaguar 3442cc 6cyl	91	Radiator
Ret		(New Zealand) Syd Jensen	JBS / JAP 1098cc V2		
Ret		(United Kingdom) Fred Tuck	Cooper T20 / Bristol 1971cc 6cyl	84	Oil Line
Ret		(Australia) Lex Davison	HWM / Jaguar 3442cc 6cyl		
Ret		(Australia) Lou Molina	MM Special / Holden 2290cc 6cyl		
Ret	14	(New Zealand) John McMillan	Alfa Romeo Tipo B / Alfa Romeo 2905cc 8cyl s/c		
Ret	2	(United Kingdom) Peter Whitehead	Ferrari 125 F1 / Ferrari 1995cc V12 s/c	15	Clutch
Ret		(Australia) Tom Hawkes	Allard J2 / Mercury 4564cc V8		
Ret		(New Zealand) Morrie Stanton	Stanton Special / DeHavilland 6124cc 4cyl		
Ret	25	(New Zealand) Allan Freeman	Cooper Mk IV / JAP 1098cc V2	10	Engine
DNS		(Australia) Artur Wylie	Wylie-Javelin / Jowett 1498cc 4cyl		Did Not Start
DNS		(New Zealand) George Smith	GeeCeeEss / Chrysler 5400cc V8		Did Not Start
DNS		(New Zealand) Hec Green	RA / RA 2100cc 4cyl s/c		Did Not Start
DNS		(New Zealand) Roly Crowther	Goldfinch Special / Ford 1904cc V8		Did Not Start
DNS		(New Zealand) Don Tilsley	Singford / Ford 1172cc 4cyl		Did Not Start
DNA		(New Zealand) Peter Ward	JBS / Norton 498cc 1cyl		Did Not Attend
DNA		(Australia) Ron Edgerton	Alfa Romeo Monza / Alfa Romeo 2300cc 8cyl s/c		Did Not Attend
DNA		(New Zealand) Ron Symons	SH Special / RA 2100cc 4cyl s/c		Did Not Attend
DNA		(New Zealand) Les Moore	Kieft C50 / Vincent 998cc V2 s/c		Did Not Attend
DNA		(New Zealand) George Palmer	Palmer Special / Mercury 4118cc V8		Did Not Attend
DNA		(New Zealand) Ron Sutherland	DeSoto Special / DeSoto 4099cc 6cyl		Did Not Attend

Sporting positions
Preceded by 1950 New Zealand Grand Prix	New Zealand Grand Prix; 1954	Succeeded by 1955 New Zealand Grand Prix
