= Eldred Norman =

- Born: Eldred De Bracton Norman; 9 January 1914; Adelaide, South Australia
- Died: 28 June 1971 (aged 57); Noosa Heads, Queensland
- Known for: inventor, racing-car driver

Eldred De Bracton Norman (9 January 1914 – 28 June 1971) was an Australian inventor and racing-car driver.

Norman was born in Adelaide, South Australia, the second of six children to Australian-born parents William Ashley Norman (a solicitor) and his wife Alma Janet née Matthews. He attended Scotch College, Adelaide. On 15 May 1941 Norman married Nancy Cato, then a 24-year-old journalist.

He was a manufacturer of sliding vane superchargers. The initial base model, the Type 65 was a bolt on performance component designed for the Holden Grey motor and remains a sought-after item among early Holden collectors.

Norman built and modified cars. He contested the Australian Grand Prix several times; he was leading the 1951 Australian Grand Prix when his twin-engined V8 Ford suffered mechanical failure. He finished fourth in the 1954 Australian Grand Prix driving a supercharged Triumph TR2 sports car. He drove his self-built Eclipse Zephyr to eighth place in the 1955 Australian Grand Prix.

In 1956 Norman retired from motor racing and focussed on inventing, but his prototypes did not reach production. He died in Noosa Heads, Queensland. Norman's son Bill would also become a successful racing driver and innovative race car constructor.

== Gallery ==
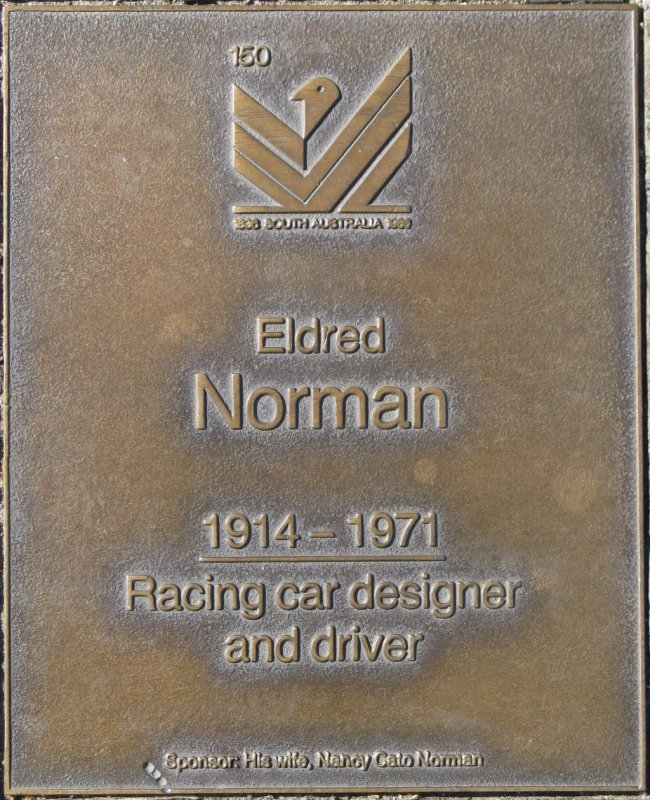
Jubilee 150 Walkway plaque

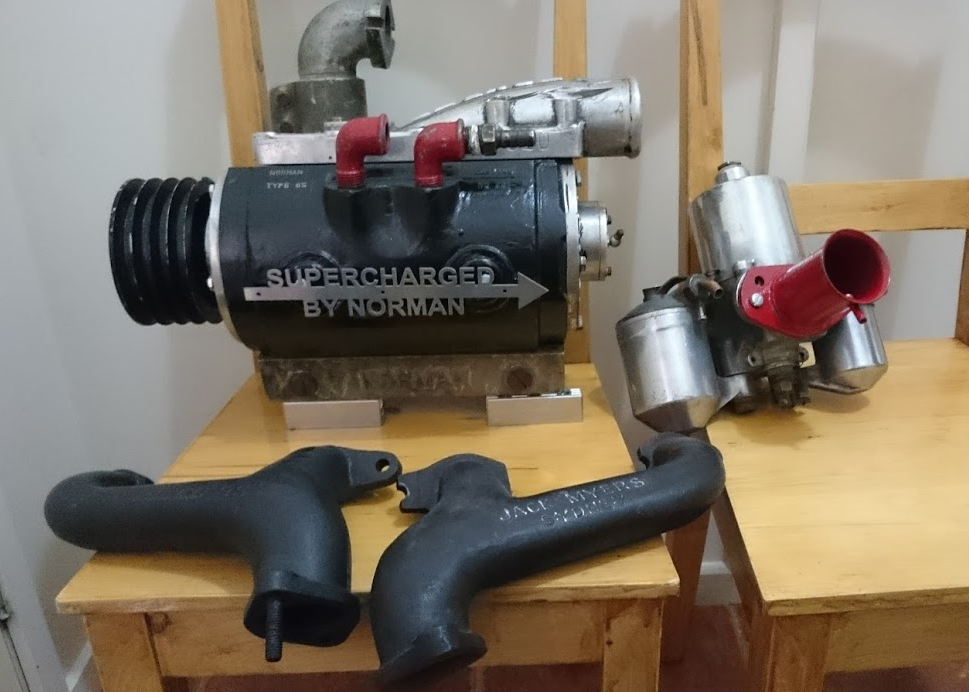
Type 65 Norman Super Charger

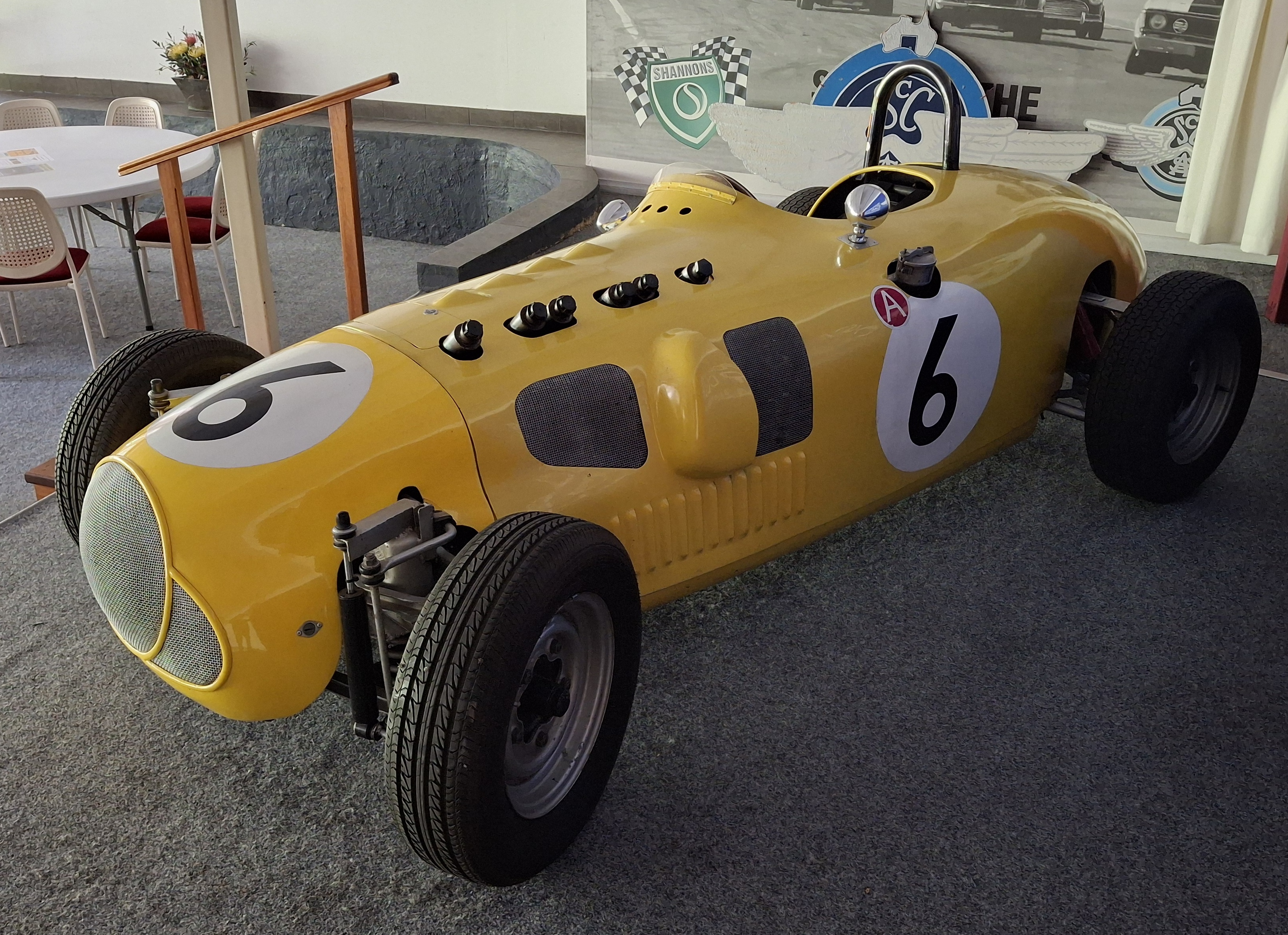
The Eclipse Zephyr which was built by Norman and driven by him to eighth place in the 1955 Australian Grand Prix. It is pictured in 2024.
