= 1956 New South Wales Road Racing Championship for Racing Cars =

Layout of the Mount Panorama Circuit (1938-1986)

The 1956 New South Wales Road Racing Championship for Racing Cars was a motor race held at the Mount Panorama Circuit, Bathurst, New South Wales, Australia on 1 October 1956. It was staged over 26 laps, a total distance of 100 miles (160 km). The race utilised a handicap format with the first car, the MG TF of Barry Topen, scheduled to start 18 minutes and 12 seconds before the last car, the Maserati 250F of Stan Jones. The championship was awarded to the driver setting the fastest time for the event, regardless of handicap result.

The championship was won by Stan Jones driving a Maserati 250F.

== Results ==
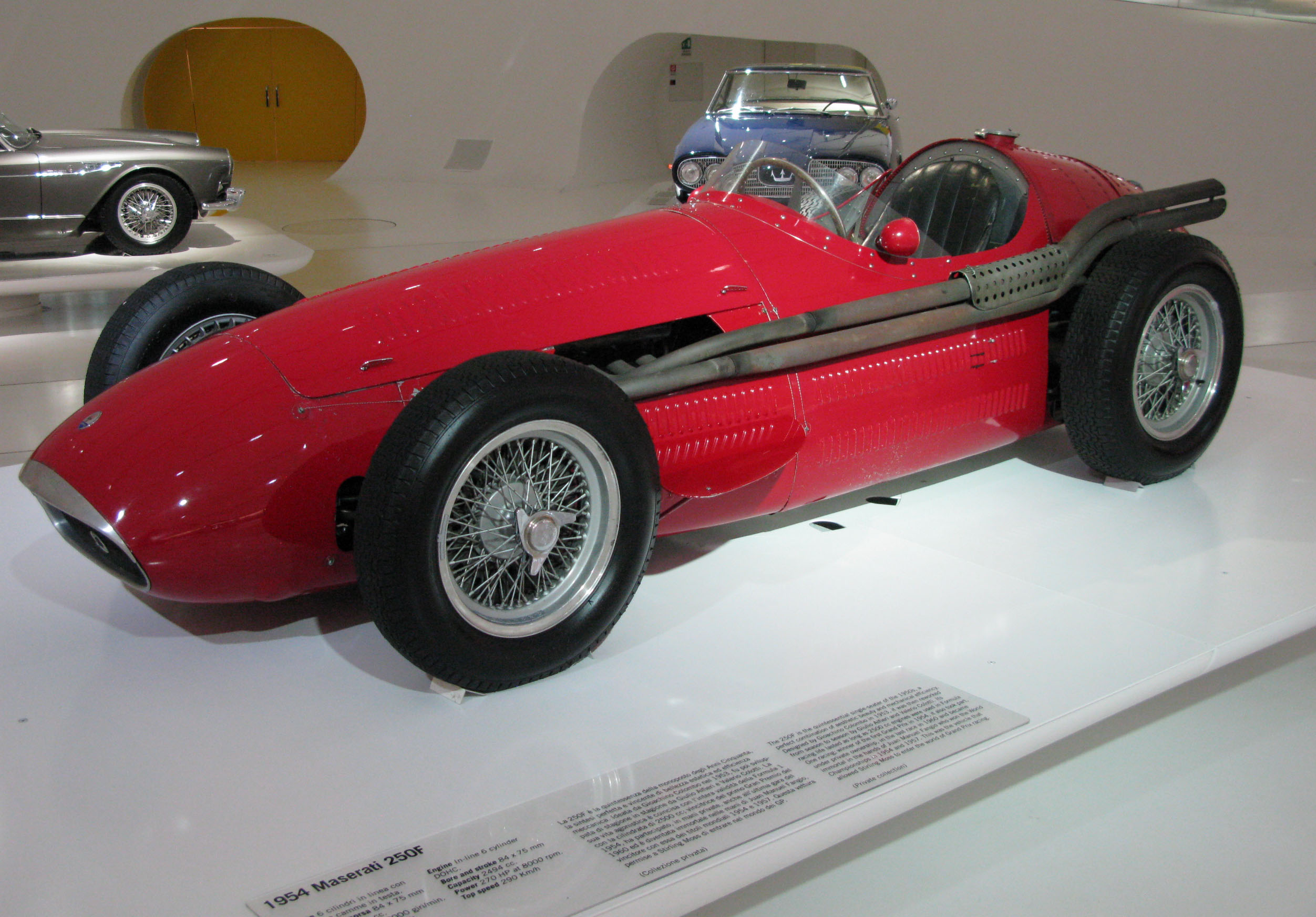
Stan Jones won the championship driving a Maserati 250F similar to the example pictured above.

Position	Driver	No.	Car	Entrant	Laps	Time	Handicap	Han. Pos.	Han. Time
1	Stan Jones	1	Maserati 250F	Stan Jones Motors	26	1:13	18:12	3	1:29:13.3
2	Bill Pitt	9	Jaguar D-Type	Mrs G. Anderson	26	1:20	13:52	8	1:32:26.7
3	Jack Robinson	14	Jaguar Special	J. Robinson	26	1:23:52	8:40	6	1:30:22.9
4	John Archibald	15	MG TC Special	J. Archibald	26	1:24	4:20	1	1:26:49.2
5	Doug Chivas	88	Lotus 6	D. Chivas	26	1:24	4:20	2	1:26:51.4
?	Norm Crowfoot	6	Holden Special	N. Crowfoot	26	?	5:38	4	1:29:18.8
?	Harvey Clift	50	MG TC Special	LJC Motors	26	?	3:28	5	1:29:26.6
?	John Martin	111	MG TC Special	J. Martin	26	?	4:20	7	1:31:59.3
?	Charlie Campbell	29	Triumph TR2	C. Campbell	?	?	2:10	?	?
DNF	Barry Garner	52	Frazer Nash	B. Garner	?	-	2:10	-	-
DNF	J. Crawford	35	Wolseley 6/80 Special	J. Crawford	?	-	3:28	-	-
DNF	Wal Anderson	4	Holden Special	W. Anderson	?	-	5:38	-	-
DNF	Jack Neal	21	Jaguar Special	J. Neal	20	-	4:20	-	-
DNF	Vincent Profilio	34	MG TC Special	V. Profilio	15	-	2:10	-	-
DNF	Ray Revell	18	Cooper MG	R. Revell	14	-	9:58	-	-
DNF	Jack Myers	3	WM Cooper	J. Myer	14	-	6:30	-	-
DNF	Col James	7	MG Special s/c	Barclay Motors	13	-	11:42	-	-
DNF	Clive Adams	8	Prad Holden	C. Adams	8	-	5:38	-	-
DNF	Merv Ward	13	Ralt 500	M. Ward	8	-	3:28	-	-
DNF	Harry Gapps	24	MG TC Special s/c	H. Gapps	3	-	2:10	-	-
DNF	Les Wheeler	11	Stewart MG	L. Wheeler	1	-	4:20	-	-
DNS	Barry Topen	104	MG TF	B. Topen	-	-	0:00	-	-

=== Notes ===
- Attendance: 8-10,000
- Fastest Lap: Stan Jones (Maserati 250F), 2:44.4, 85.9 m.p.h., (new lap record)
