= Port Wakefield Circuit =

Former motor racing circuit in Port Wakefield, South Australia

- Location: Phillips Street, Porth Wakefield, South Australia
- Coordinates: 34°10′59″S 138°10′55″E
- Opened: 1953
- Closed: 14 May 1961; 65 years ago
- Major events: Australian Drivers' Championship (1957–1960); Australian Grand Prix (1955)

Full Circuit (1953–1961)
- Length: 2.092 km (1.300 mi)
- Turns: 6
- Race lap record: 56 seconds ( (Australia) Bib Stillwell, Cooper Coventry Climax, 1960 )

Port Wakefield Circuit was a motor racing circuit located approximately 1 km (0.62 mi) east of the town of Port Wakefield, South Australia. It was the first purpose built motor racing facility built in Australia after World War II, and only the second in Australian history.

Following the introduction of a South Australian state government ban on motor racing on public roads in December 1951, a company, Brooklyn Speedway Ltd., was formed by local enthusiasts and the Port Wakefield circuit was created. The Grand Opening Speed Meeting was held on New Year's Day 1953. The ban stayed in place until 1985 when it was rescinded to create the Adelaide Street Circuit for use in the Australian Grand Prix which had become a round of the Formula One World Championship.

Port Wakefield was a small circuit for its time, in an era of three to four mile circuits. The limitations created a circuit of just 2.092 km (1.300 mi). The circuit played host to the 1955 Australian Grand Prix, won by Jack Brabham. Brabham's win in a Cooper T40 Bristol was his first Australian Grand Prix victory and the first AGP win by a rear-engined car.

When it came to be South Australia's turn to again host the AGP in 1961, the Port Wakefield Circuit was declared inadequate and the 3.379 km (2.100 mi) Mallala Race Circuit was created. With part of Port Wakefield's facilities used to create Mallala, the circuit faded very quickly back into the scrub, though the outline of the circuit is still visible via Google Maps.

The circuit ran clockwise, and started on the Repco Straight. This was followed by a right hand kink before a sharp left turn leading into the right hand TyreSoles Hairpin, the slowest turn on the circuit. A short run south to the right hand Kallin corner led onto the longest 0.600 km (0.373 mi) straight on the circuit, Thompson Motors Straight. Dunlop corner (turn 5), and Stonyfell (turn 6), led back onto the Repco Straight. Lap times for the circuit were around the 1 minute mark, with Brabham and Reg Hunt (Cooper T40 and Maserati A6GCM) sharing the fastest lap of the 1955 AGP at 1:03.0.

The last race meeting, organised by the Austin 7 Club of South Australia, was held on 14 May 1961.
