= Longford Circuit =

Motorsport circuit in Tasmania, Australia

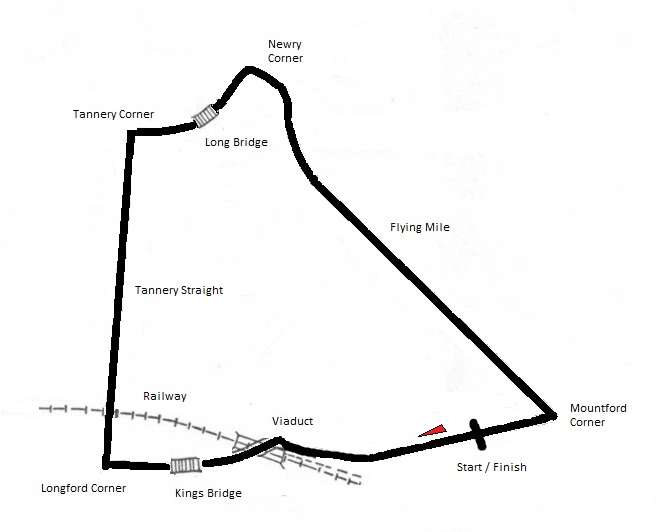
- Grand Prix Circuit (1953–1968)
- Location: Longford, Tasmania
- Coordinates: 41°34′44″S 147°7′25″E
- Operator: Longford Motor Racing Association (1953–1968)
- Opened: 1953
- Closed: 1968
- Major events: Australian Drivers' Championship (1958–1965); Australian Grand Prix (1959, 1965); Australian Tourist Trophy (1960, 1964, 1966); Australian Touring Car Championship (1962); Tasman Series (1964–1968)

Grand Prix Circuit (1953–1968)
- Length: 7.242 km (4.500 mi)
- Turns: 9
- Race lap record: 2:12.6 ( (New Zealand) Chris Amon, Ferrari P4, 1968, Sports prototype)

The Longford Circuit was a temporary motor racing course laid out on public roads at Longford, 23 km (14 mi) south-west of Launceston in Tasmania, Australia. It was located on the northern edges of the town and its 7.242 km (4.500 mi) lap passed under a railway line viaduct, crossed the South Esk River via the wooden Kings Bridge, turned hard right at the doorstep of the Longford Hotel, passed over the railway line using a level crossing and traversed the South Esk again via another wooden structure, the Long Bridge.

The circuit was in use from 1953 to 1968.

== History ==
Its first race meeting was held in 1953, the Australian Grand Prix was staged there in 1959 and 1965 and the track hosted a round of the Tasman Series each year from 1964 to 1968. It was also the venue for the single race 1962 Australian Touring Car Championship (at 7.242 km (4.500 mi), Longford is the longest circuit ever used in the ATCC), the Australian Tourist Trophy in 1960, 1964 & 1966 and a round of the Australian Drivers' Championship each year from 1958 to 1965. Its use as a motor racing venue was curtailed due to financial issues, following the running of the 1968 Tasman Series meeting.

== Drivers ==
Drivers who raced at Longford read as a "who's who" of 1960s Grand Prix racing. The list includes World Champions Jack Brabham, Jim Clark, Graham Hill, Phil Hill, Denny Hulme and Jackie Stewart, as well as Bruce McLaren and Chris Amon. Australian open wheel and touring car stars Bib Stillwell, Lex Davison, Leo Geoghegan, Frank Matich, Frank Gardner, Spencer Martin, Kevin Bartlett, John Harvey, Ian Geoghegan, Norm Beechey, Bob Jane and Allan Moffat also raced at the circuit. Tasmanian John Youl was among the leading drivers in Australia during the 1960 period.

== Lap record ==
The new outright lap record of 2:12.6 set by New Zealand’s Chris Amon in a Ferrari P4 sports car at the final meeting was, with an average lap speed of 196.7 km/h (122.2 mph), the fastest lap record for any Australian motor racing circuit and would remain so until the opening of the new Calder Park Thunderdome in Melbourne in 1987, though unlike Longford which is a road circuit, the Thunderdome is a 1.801 km (1.119 mi) high-banked (24° in the turns) quad-oval speedway. Longford would continue as Australia's fastest road racing circuit until the Formula One series moved to the new Albert Park Grand Prix Circuit in Melbourne in 1996. The official fastest race lap records at the Longford Circuit are listed as:

Category	Time	Driver	Vehicle	Date
Grand Prix Circuit (1953–1968): 7.242 km (4.500 mi)
Sports prototype	2:12.6	Chris Amon	Ferrari P4	2 March 1968
Formula Two	2:13.3	Jack Brabham	Cooper T79	5 March 1967
Formula One	2:18.5	Jackie Stewart	BRM P261	7 March 1966
Formula Libre	2:27.0	Arnold Glass	Maserati 250F	2 March 1959
Group 1	3:07.1	Bob Jane	Jaguar Mark 2 3.8	3 March 1962

== Present day ==
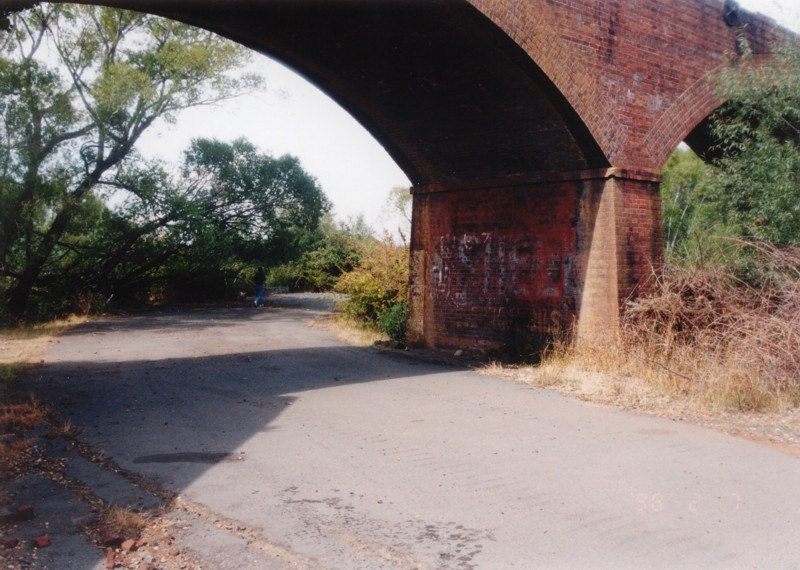
The remains of the Viaduct corner where the circuit crossed underneath a railway

There is little left of the original track as the two bridges have long been demolished and a highway now intersects the network of roads on which the circuit was laid out.

Motorsport returned to Longford in 2011 with the first running of the Longford Revival Festival which takes place on Pateena Road (The Flying Mile). There drivers get to run their cars, both road cars and historic race cars, down The Flying Mile.
