= Stan Jones (racing driver) =

Australian racing driver

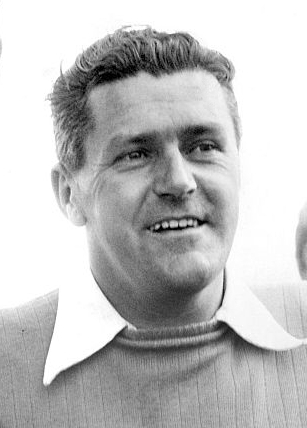
- Jones after winning the 50 mile Victorian Trophy Race on 6 October 1953
- Nationality: Australian
- Born: 16 March 1923
- Died: March 1973
- Relatives: Alan Jones (son)

Australian Drivers' Championship
- Wins: 5
- Best finish: 1st in 1958 Australian Drivers' Championship

Championship titles
- 1954 1958 1959: New Zealand Grand Prix; Australian Drivers' Champ. Australian Grand Prix

Stanley Jones (16 March 1923 – ? March 1973) was an Australian racing driver.

Today better known as father of 1980 World Drivers' Champion Alan Jones, Stan was a prominent racing driver himself, racing mainly in the 1950s. He is one of eleven drivers to have won the Australian and New Zealand Grands Prix. Jones raced the Maybach Specials, the last of the great Australian built specials to remain competitive against the imported European Formula 1 cars, before racing a Maserati 250F.

An amateur racer, his career declined along with the ability of his business interests (mostly car dealerships) to fund it. After two strokes Jones moved to London to be with his son Alan, and died just short of his 50th birthday.

== Career results ==
Year	Race / Series	Position	Car	Entrant
1956	New South Wales Road Racing Championship for Racing Cars	1st	Maserati 250F	Stan Jones Motors
1957	Australian Drivers' Championship	3rd	Maserati 250F	
1958	Australian Drivers' Championship	1st	Maserati 250F	
1959	Australian Drivers' Championship	3rd	Maybach III-Chevrolet; Maserati 250F; Cooper T51-Climax; Sabakat-Porsche	
1961	Australian Drivers' Championship	4th	Cooper T51-Climax	

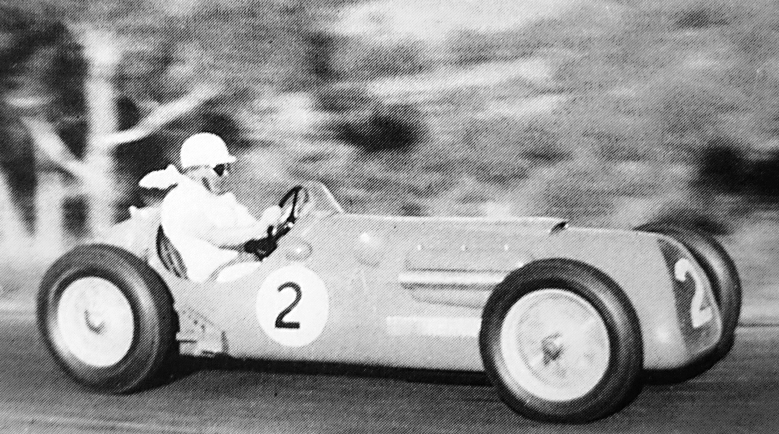
Stan Jones (Maybach) contesting the 1954 Bathurst 100

Sporting positions
Preceded by John McMillan	Winner of the New Zealand Grand Prix; 1954	Succeeded by Birabongse Bhanudej
Preceded by Lex Davison	Winner of the Australian Drivers' Championship; 1958	Succeeded by Len Lukey
Preceded by Lex Davison	Winner of the Australian Grand Prix; 1959	Succeeded by Alec Mildren
