= Len Lukey =

Australian racing driver

Len Lukey (1921/1922 - 28 October 1978) was an Australian racing driver. He was the winner of the 1959 Australian Drivers' Championship driving a Lukey Bristol and a Cooper T45 Coventry Climax.

== Motorsport career ==
Lukey made his motor sport debut in 1953 at the wheel of Ford Mainline Utility. After such vehicles were ruled ineligible, he moved on to racing Ford Customlines, winning the main saloon car race at the Albert Park Circuit in March 1957.

In October 1956 Lukey purchased a Cooper T23 Bristol which he first raced in the 1956 Australian Grand Prix meeting, finishing ninth in the main event. The following year Lukey used the car at Coonabarabran to establish a new Category E Australian National Speed record of 147.4 mph for the flying kilometre.

Lukey acquired a Cooper T45 from Jack Brabham in early 1959 and embarked on a concerted campaign to win the 1959 Australian Drivers' Championship. He won the title by 2 points, securing the championship at the twelfth and final race of the series. His last race was the 1960 New Zealand Grand Prix after which he retired from active participation at the age of 38.

In 1964 Lukey purchased the property which included what is now the Phillip Island Grand Prix Circuit in Victoria for $40,000. Following extensive repairs, the circuit was reopened in 1967 and ownership was retained by Lukey's estate until 1984.

Lukey died on 28 October 1978 in Melbourne, aged 56. Turn 9 on the Phillip Island circuit is named Lukey Heights in his memory.

=== Career results ===
Year	Series / Event	Position	Car	Entrant
1957	Australian Drivers' Championship	5th	Cooper T23 Bristol	Len Lukey
1958	Australian Drivers' Championship	3rd	Cooper T23 Bristol; Lukey Bristol	Lukey Mufflers
1959	Australian Drivers' Championship	1st	Lukey Bristol & Cooper T45 Coventry Climax	Lukey Mufflers Pty. Ltd.
