= 2008 New Zealand Grand Prix =

- Race 3, Round 3 of 7 of the 2007–08 Toyota Racing Series

Race details
- Date: 13 January 2008
- Official name: LIII New Zealand Grand Prix
- Location: Manfeild Autocourse, Feilding, New Zealand
- Course: Permanent racing facility
- Course length: 3.033 km (1.885 miles)
- Distance: 35 laps, 106.16 km (65.96 miles)

Pole position
| Driver | (New Zealand) Andy Knight | Knight Motorsport |
- Time: 1:04.489

Fastest lap
| Driver | (New Zealand) Nelson Hartley | Victory Motor Racing |
- Time: 1:04.167 on lap 15

Podium
| First | (New Zealand) Andy Knight | Knight Motorsport |
| Second | (New Zealand) Matt Halliday | Triple X Motorsport |
| Third | (New Zealand) Ben Harford | NZ Motorsport Trust |

The 2008 New Zealand Grand Prix was an open wheel racing car race held at Manfeild Autocourse, near Feilding on 13 January 2008.

It was the fifty third New Zealand Grand Prix and was open to Toyota Racing Series cars (based on international Formula 3 regulations). The event was also the third race of the third round of the 2007–08 Toyota Racing Series.

== Classification ==
=== Qualifying ===
| Pos | No. | Driver | Team | Q1 | Q2 | Q3 | Grid |
|---|---|---|---|---|---|---|---|
| 1 | 5 | (New Zealand) Andy Knight | Knight Motorsport | 1:04.533 | 1:04.094 | 1:04.489 | 1 |
| 2 | 3 | (New Zealand) Matt Halliday | Triple X Motorsport | 1:04.178 | 1:03.928 | 1:04.556 | 2 |
| 3 | 1 | (New Zealand) Earl Bamber | International Motorsport | 1:04.383 | 1:03.867 | 1:04.596 | 3 |
| 4 | 9 | (New Zealand) Nic Jordan | Motorsport Solutions | 1:04.768 | 1:04.515 | 1:04.633 | 4 |
| 5 | 28 | (New Zealand) Nelson Hartley | Victory Motor Racing | 1:04.312 | 1:04.160 | 1:04.706 | 5 |
| 6 | 27 | (New Zealand) Daniel Gaunt | International Motorsport | 1:04.330 | 1:04.037 | 1:04.798 | 6 |
| 7 | 47 | (Australia) Nathan Antunes | European Technique | 1:04.928 | 1:04.545 | 1:04.879 | 7 |
| 8 | 7 | (New Zealand) Ben Harford | NZ Motorsport Trust | 1:04.471 | 1:04.438 | 1:04.962 | 8 |
| 9 | 10 | (New Zealand) Dominic Storey | Ken Smith Motorsport | 1:04.411 | 1:04.266 | 1:06.295 | 9 |
| 10 | 74 | (New Zealand) Michael Burdett | Motorsport Solutions | 1:04.340 | 1:03.937 | 1:10.269 | 10 |
| 11 | 6 | (New Zealand) Hamish Cross | Scorpion Racing | 1:05.030 | 1:04.553 | | 11 |
| 12 | 55 | (New Zealand) Christina Orr | Mark Petch Motorsport | 1:05.171 | 1:04.554 | | 12 |
| 13 | 2 | (New Zealand) Mitch Cunningham | International Motorsport | 1:04.736 | 1:04.797 | | 13 |
| 14 | 87 | (New Zealand) Ben Crighton | Ben Crighton Motorsport | 1:05.147 | 1:04.763 | | 14 |
| 15 | 19 | (New Zealand) Michael Pickens | Knight Motorsport | 1:05.347 | 1:04.937 | | 15 |
| 16 | 20 | (New Zealand) Daynom Templeman | | 1:05.384 | 1:05.128 | | 16 |
| 17 | 11 | (New Zealand) Ken Smith | Ken Smith Motorsport | 1:05.391 | 1:05.220 | | 17 |
| 18 | 44 | (Iceland) Kristján Einar | Triple X Motorsport | 1:06.072 | 1:05.419 | | 18 |

=== Grand Prix ===
| Pos | No. | Driver | Team | Laps | Time | Grid |
|---|---|---|---|---|---|---|
| 1 | 5 | (New Zealand) Andy Knight | Knight Motorsport | 35 | 43min 15.936sec | 1 |
| 2 | 3 | (New Zealand) Matt Halliday | Triple X Motorsport | 35 | + 0.136 s | 2 |
| 3 | 7 | (New Zealand) Ben Harford | NZ Motorsport Trust | 35 | + 0.553 s | 8 |
| 4 | 10 | (New Zealand) Dominic Storey | Ken Smith Motorsport | 35 | + 1.022 s | 9 |
| 5 | 1 | (New Zealand) Earl Bamber | International Motorsport | 35 | + 1.655 s | 3 |
| 6 | 20 | (New Zealand) Daynom Templeman | | 35 | + 3.228 s | 16 |
| 7 | 55 | (New Zealand) Christina Orr | Mark Petch Motorsport | 35 | + 4.216 s | 12 |
| 8 | 74 | (New Zealand) Michael Burdett | Motorsport Solutions | 35 | + 4.933 s | 10 |
| 9 | 6 | (New Zealand) Hamish Cross | Scorpion Racing | 35 | + 5.123 s | 11 |
| 10 | 87 | (New Zealand) Ben Crighton | Ben Crighton Racing | 35 | + 6.969 s | 14 |
| 11 | 11 | (New Zealand) Ken Smith | Ken Smith Motorsport | 35 | + 7.741 s | 17 |
| 12 | 2 | (New Zealand) Mitch Cunningham | International Motorsport | 35 | + 11.769 s | 13 |
| 13 | 44 | (Iceland) Kristján Einar | Triple X Motorsport | 35 | + 12.587 s | 18 |
| 14 | 19 | (New Zealand) Michael Pickens | Knight Motorsport | 35 | + 17.607 s | 15 |
| 15 | 47 | (Australia) Nathan Antunes | European Technique | 35 | + 18.511 s | 7 |
| Ret | 27 | (New Zealand) Daniel Gaunt | International Motorsport | 28 | Retired | 6 |
| Ret | 28 | (New Zealand) Nelson Hartley | Victory Motor Racing | 27 | Retired | 5 |
| Ret | 9 | (New Zealand) Nic Jordan | Motorsport Solutions | 16 | Retired | 4 |

| Preceded by 2007 New Zealand Grand Prix | New Zealand Grand Prix; 2008 | Succeeded by 2009 New Zealand Grand Prix |
