= 2009 New Zealand Grand Prix =

- Race 3, Round 5 of 6 of the 2008–09 Toyota Racing Series

Race details
- Date: 1 March 2009
- Official name: LIV New Zealand Grand Prix
- Location: Manfeild Autocourse, Feilding, New Zealand
- Course: Permanent racing facility
- Course length: 3.033 km (1.885 miles)
- Distance: 35 laps, 106.16 km (65.96 miles)

Pole position
Driver	(New Zealand) Daniel Gaunt	Triple X Motorsport
- Time: 1:09.713

Fastest lap
Driver	(New Zealand) Earl Bamber	Earl Bamber Motorsport
- Time: 1:09.502 on lap 35

Podium
First	(New Zealand) Daniel Gaunt	Triple X Motorsport
Second	(New Zealand) Earl Bamber	Earl Bamber Motorsport
Third	(New Zealand) Sam MacNeill	Motorsport Solutions

The 2009 New Zealand Grand Prix was an open wheel racing car race held at Manfeild Autocourse, near Feilding on 1 March 2009.

It was the fifty-fourth New Zealand Grand Prix and was open to Toyota Racing Series cars (based on international Formula Three regulations). The event was also the third race of the fifth round of the 2008–09 Toyota Racing Series. Daniel Gaunt won his second New Zealand Grand Prix in three years, reclaiming the honours from Andy Knight.

== Classification ==
TRS Lites entries

=== Qualifying ===
Pos	No.	Driver	Team	Q1	Q2	Grid
1	47	(New Zealand) Daniel Gaunt	Triple X Motorsport	1:11.064	1:09.713	1
2	32	(New Zealand) Mitch Cunningham	Giles Motorsport	1:10.836	1:09.901	2
3	2	(New Zealand) Earl Bamber	Earl Bamber Motorsport	1:10.690	1:09.906	3
4	19	(New Zealand) Sam MacNeill	Motorsport Solutions	1:11.611	1:10.066	4
5	74	(New Zealand) Michael Burdett	Motorsport Solutions	1:10.920	1:10.226	5
6	9	(New Zealand) Daniel Jilesen	Giles Motorsport	1:11.733	1:10.408	6
7	5	(Australia) Scott Pye	European Technique	1:11.273	1:10.415	7
8	14	(New Zealand) Keeley Pudney	Giles Motorsport	1:12.389	1:10.478	8
9	69	(New Zealand) Alastair Wootten	Privateer	1:11.315	1:10.479	9
10	48	(New Zealand) Andrew Waite	Giles Motorsport	1:11.432	1:10.760	10
11	89	(New Zealand) John Whelan	Motorsport Solutions	1:12.633	1:11.357	11
12	4	(New Zealand) Mitch Evans	Privateer	1:16.337	1:14.491	12
13	12	(United Kingdom) Chris Cox	Privateer	1:17.138	1:15.145	13
-	11	(New Zealand) Ken Smith	Ken Smith Motorsport	no time	no time	14

=== Race ===
Pos	No	Driver	Car	Laps	Time/Retired	Grid
1	47	(New Zealand) Daniel Gaunt	Triple X Motorsport	35	45min 35.667sec	1
2	2	(New Zealand) Earl Bamber	Earl Bamber Motorsport	35	+ 3.049 s	3
3	19	(New Zealand) Sam MacNeill	Motorsport Solutions	35	+ 11.200 s	4
4	89	(New Zealand) John Whelan	Motorsport Solutions	35	+ 14.580 s	11
5	5	(Australia) Scott Pye	European Technique	35	+ 14.897 s	7
6	74	(New Zealand) Michael Burdett	Motorsport Solutions	35	+ 15.446 s	5
7	11	(New Zealand) Ken Smith	Ken Smith Motorsport	35	+ 17.984 s	14
8	14	(New Zealand) Keeley Pudney	Giles Motorsport	35	+ 32.937 s	8
9	4	(New Zealand) Mitch Evans	Privateer	35	+ 59.962 s	12
10	12	(United Kingdom) Chris Cox	Privateer	34	+ 1 lap	13
11	48	(New Zealand) Andrew Waite	Privateer	33	+ 2 laps	10
12	69	(New Zealand) Alastair Wootten	Motorsport Solutions	32	+ 3 laps	9
13	32	(New Zealand) Mitch Cunningham	Giles Motorsport	31	+ 4 laps	2
Ret	9	(New Zealand) Daniel Jilesen	Giles Motorsport	28	Retired	6

Preceded by 2008 New Zealand Grand Prix	New Zealand Grand Prix; 2009	Succeeded by 2010 New Zealand Grand Prix
