= 2010 New Zealand Grand Prix =

- Race 3, Round 4 of 5 of the 2010 Toyota Racing Series

Race details
- Date: 14 February 2010
- Official name: LV New Zealand Grand Prix
- Location: Manfeild Autocourse, Feilding, New Zealand
- Course: Permanent racing facility
- Course length: 3.033 km (1.885 miles)
- Distance: 35 laps, 106.16 km (65.96 miles)
- Weather: Fine

Pole position
Driver	(New Zealand) Mitch Evans	Giles Motorsport
- Time: 1:03.923

Fastest lap
Driver	(Estonia) Sten Pentus	Giles Motorsport
- Time: 1:04.229 on lap 26

Podium
First	(New Zealand) Earl Bamber	Triple X Motorsport
Second	(New Zealand) Mitch Evans	Giles Motorsport
Third	(Estonia) Sten Pentus	Giles Motorsport

The 2010 New Zealand Grand Prix was an open wheel racing car race held at Manfeild Autocourse, near Feilding on 14 February 2010.

It was the fifty-fifth New Zealand Grand Prix and was open to Toyota Racing Series cars. The event was also the third race of the fourth round of the 2010 Toyota Racing Series.

== Classification ==
=== Qualifying ===
Pos	No.	Driver	Team	Time	Grid
1	4	(New Zealand) Mitch Evans	Giles Motorsport	1:03.923	1
2	7	(New Zealand) Earl Bamber	Triple X Motorsport	1:04.006	2
3	47	(New Zealand) Richie Stanaway	ETEC Motorsport	1:04.107	3
4	20	(Estonia) Sten Pentus	Giles Motorsport	1:04.107	4
5	47	(Brazil) Lucas Foresti	Giles Motorsport	1:04.236	5
6	8	(New Zealand) Jamie McNee	Neale Motorsport	1:04.382	6
7	41	(New Zealand) Stefan Webling	Triple X Motorsport	1:04.411	7
8	9	(New Zealand) Daniel Jilesen	Giles Motorsport	1:04.574	8
9	69	(New Zealand) Alastair Wootten	DART International	1:04.644	9
10	6	(New Zealand) Sam MacNeill	Sam MacNeill Motorsport	1:04.747	10
11	11	(New Zealand) Ken Smith	Ken Smith Motorsport	1:05.595	11
12	48	(New Zealand) Andrew Waite	ETEC Motorsport	1:05.695	12

=== Race ===
Pos	No	Driver	Team	Laps	Time/Retired	Grid
1	7	(New Zealand) Earl Bamber	Triple X Motorsport	35	38min 43.796sec	2
2	4	(New Zealand) Mitch Evans	Giles Motorsport	35	+ 0.512 s	1
3	20	(Estonia) Sten Pentus	Giles Motorsport	35	+ 1.207 s	4
4	47	(New Zealand) Richie Stanaway	ETEC Motorsport	35	+ 3.315 s	3
5	9	(New Zealand) Daniel Jilesen	Giles Motorsport	35	+ 4.214 s	8
6	8	(New Zealand) Jamie McNee	Neale Motorsport	35	+ 5.312 s	6
7	6	(New Zealand) Sam MacNeill	Sam MacNeill Motorsport	35	+ 5.378 s	10
8	48	(New Zealand) Andrew Waite	ETEC Motorsport	35	+ 6.888 s	12
9	69	(New Zealand) Alastair Wootten	DART International	35	+ 7.311 s	9
10	11	(New Zealand) Ken Smith	Ken Smith Motorsport	35	+ 10.450 s	11
11	41	(New Zealand) Stefan Webling	Triple X Motorsport	33	+ 2 laps	7
Ret	28	(Brazil) Lucas Foresti	Giles Motorsport	4	Retired	5

Preceded by 2009 New Zealand Grand Prix	New Zealand Grand Prix; 2010	Succeeded by 2011 New Zealand Grand Prix
