= Nathan Antunes =

Australian race car driver

- Nationality: Australian
- Born: 23 April 1988 (age 38) Sydney, New South Wales, Australia
- Categorisation: FIA Silver

Previous series
- 2013-16 2006-09 2007-08 2006 2006 2005 2004: Australian GT Championship; Toyota Racing Series; A1 Grand Prix; Formula 3 Germany; Formula Renault 2.0 NEC; Formula BMW UK; Formula Ford New South Wales

Nathan William Cavaco Antunes (born 23 April 1988) in Sydney, Australia is best known as an Australian race car driver. Educated at Trinity Grammar School in Sydney, he has raced in a variety of classes throughout the world.

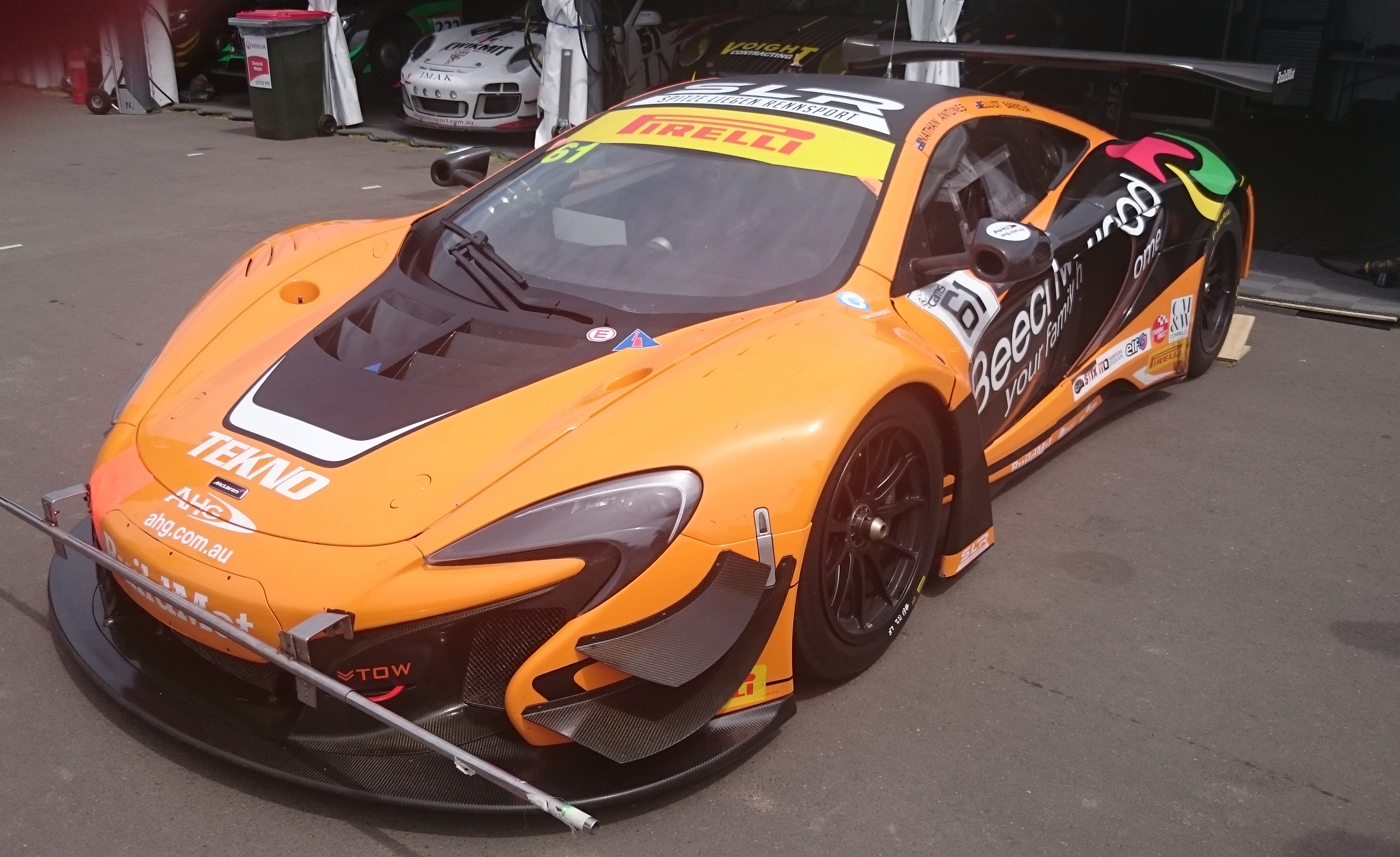
Antunes placed sixth in the 2016 Australian GT Championship driving a McLaren 650S GT3

== Racing career ==
=== Junior Karting ===
Antunes began his career in 1996 and was Goulburn Kart Club Champion in 1997, 1998 (midget karting) and 1999 (rookie karting). He was also the North Shore Kart Club Champion and ACT Junior Sprint Classic Champion in 1998 and 1999.

In 2001, Antunes made his first appearance in National Championships Junior National Light and placed seventh in the Junior Clubman NSW Championship. In 2002, he placed fifth in the Junior ICA Australian Championship, fourth in the Junior Piston Port NSW Championship (Junior ICA) and fourth in the Junior Clubman NSW Championship improving on his seventh place the year before.

In 2003, Antunes placed fifth in the ICA Australian Championship and competed in the Formula 100 Light Australian Championships at the age of 14. Unfortunately, an accident in the semi-final of Clubman Light did not allow him to complete the season.

=== Formula Ford ===
Antunes began in Formula Ford after missing the first race of the season due to age licence restrictions. He placed fifth in the NSW Championship in 2004. He competed in one race in his home state of New South Wales at Oran Park Raceway.

=== Formula BMW ===
In 2005, Antunes moved to Europe to pursue his career and competed in the Formula BMW UK Championship. Antunes drove for Motaworld Racing, finishing seventh in the championship and in the top-five teams. The season included one win, three third placings and three pole positions.

Antunes also raced at the Formula BMW World Championship in Bahrain for Motaworld Racing. He finished fifth – the highest finish for Motaworld racing to date – up from 18th place in qualifying.

=== Formula Renault ===
2006 saw Antunes step into Formula Renault car for the first time North European and European Series but did not race the full season. Racing with Motopark Academy, Antunes raced at Circuit Zolder, also known as Circuit Terlaemen in Belgium, qualifying 23rd and finishing 14th. He also raced in the Formula Renault 2.0 Northern European Cup at Motorsport Arena Oschersleben in Germany, Circuit de Spa-Francorchamps in Belgium and Nürburgring in Germany.

Antunes also tested at the World Series by Renault.

=== Formula 3 ===
Antunes also competed in the Formula 3 Recaro Cup German Championship in 2006 with the HS Technik Motorsport team. At three events, Antunes placed eighth, sixth, fourth, third, first and retired due to car failure and took one pole position in six races.

Antunes also tested at the World Series by Renault.

=== GP2 ===
On 30 October 2007, Antunes tested for Super Nova Racing at Paul Ricard Circuit in France.

=== Toyota Racing Series ===
Antunes competed in the Toyota Racing Series in New Zealand with Team European Technique owned by Trevor Sheumatk. Scheumatk is the Managing Director of Track Tyres, the sole distributor of Michelin Racing Tyres in Australia and New Zealand. He placed 14th.

=== A1 Grand Prix ===
Antunes made his A1 Grand Prix debut with A1 Team Australia in Shanghai, China in April 2008. He drove in the Rookie sessions for the team, placing seventh and eighth in session 1 and 2 respectively. This paced the team in seventh overall.

In Brands Hatch in May 2008, Antunes again drove for the team in the Rookie sessions, notching up a tenth and an eighth place.

== Career results ==
Season	Series	Position	Car	Team
2004	New South Wales Formula Ford Championship	6th	Van Diemen RF94 Ford	
2005	British Formula BMW Championship	7th	Mygale FB02 BMW	Motaworld Racing
2005	Formula BMW World Final	5th	Mygale FB02 BMW	Motaworld Racing
2006	Formula Renault 2.0 NEC	24th	Tatuus FR2000 Renault	Motopark Academy
2006	Eurocup Formula Renault 2.0	34th	Tatuus FR2000 Renault	Motopark Academy
2006	German Formula Three Championship	10th	Lola B06/30 Opel	HS Technik Motorsport
2007-08	Toyota Racing Series	14th	Tatuus TT104ZZ Toyota	European Technique
2007-08	A1 Grand Prix	13th †	Lola B05/52 - Zytek	A1 Team Australia
2008-09	Toyota Racing Series	11th	Tatuus TT104ZZ Toyota	European Technique
2013	Australian GT Championship	15th	Audi R8 LMS Ultra	Melbourne Performance Centre
2014	Australian GT Championship - GT Trophy class	**3rd**	Audi R8 LMS Ultra	Rod Salmon
2015	Australian GT Championship	4th	Audi R8 Ultra	Melbourne Performance Centre
2016	Australian GT Championship	6th	McLaren 650S GT3	Tekno Autosports

† Team result

=== Complete Eurocup Formula Renault 2.0 results ===
(key) (Races in bold indicate pole position; races in italics indicate fastest lap)

Year	Entrant	1	2	3	4	5	6	7	8	9	10	11	12	13	14	DC	Points
2006	Motopark Academy	ZOL; 1; 14	ZOL; 2 Ret	IST; 1	IST; 2	MIS; 1	MIS; 2	NÜR; 1	NÜR; 2	DON; 1	DON; 2	LMS; 1	LMS; 2	CAT; 1	CAT; 2	34th	0

=== Complete Formula Renault 2.0 NEC results ===
(key) (Races in bold indicate pole position) (Races in italics indicate fastest lap)

Year	Entrant	1	2	3	4	5	6	7	8	9	10	11	12	13	14	15	16	DC	Points
2006	Motopark Academy	OSC; 1 Ret	OSC; 2 Ret	SPA; 1; 8	SPA; 2; 5	NÜR; 1 Ret	NÜR; 2; 13	ZAN; 1	ZAN; 2	OSC; 1	OSC; 2	ASS; 1	ASS; 2	AND; 1	AND; 2	SAL; 1	SAL; 2	24th	37

=== Complete A1 Grand Prix results ===
(key) (Races in bold indicate pole position) (Races in italics indicate fastest lap)

Year	Entrant	1	2	3	4	5	6	7	8	9	10	11	12	13	14	15	16	17	18	19	20	DC	Points
2007–08	Australia	NED; SPR	NED; FEA	CZE; SPR	CZE; FEA	MYS; SPR	MYS; FEA	CHN; SPR	CHN; FEA	NZL; SPR	NZL; FEA	AUS; SPR	AUS; FEA	RSA; SPR	RSA; FEA	MEX; SPR	MEX; FEA	CHN; SPR; PO	CHN; FEA; PO	GBR; SPR; PO	GBR; FEA; PO	17th	20

=== Complete New Zealand Grand Prix results ===
Year	Team	Car	Qualifying	Main race
2008	(New Zealand) European Technique	Tatuus TT104ZZ - Toyota	7th	15th

=== Complete Bathurst 12 Hour results ===
Year	Car#	Team	Co-drivers	Car	Class	Laps	Pos.	Class pos.
2015	5	(Australia) Rod Salmon Racing	(United Kingdom) Oliver Gavin (Australia) Rod Salmon	Audi R8 LMS	AA	103	DNF	DNF
2016	5	(Australia) GT Motorsport	(Australia) Barton Mawer (Australia) Greg Taylor	Audi R8 LMS	AA	294	6th	**1st**
2017	5	(Australia) GT Motorsport	(Australia) Elliot Barbour (Australia) Greg Taylor	Audi R8 LMS	AAM	161	DNF	DNF
