= Stephen Giles (motorsport) =

New Zealand motorsports executive

- Citizenship: New Zealand
- Occupation: Motorsports Executive
- Employer: Giles Motorsport
- Title: Team manager

Stephen Giles is a New Zealand Formula One and motorsport mechanic and executive. He is currently the team manager for the Giles Motorsport Formula Regional Oceania Trophy team.

== Career ==
Giles began his career in Formula One in 1996 with McLaren's test team, being promoted to the race team the following season. He was No 2 mechanic for David Coulthard in 1997 and 1998 and No 1 with Mika Häkkinen in his championship-winning years of 1999 and 2000. From 2001–2005 he was McLaren's chief mechanic.

In 2008 he founded his own team, Giles Motorsport, which has competed in the Formula Regional Oceania Trophy series every year since then.
