= 2007–08 Toyota Racing Series =

Motor racing competition

Seasons
- ← 2006–07 2008–09 →

The 2007–08 Toyota Racing Series was the fourth running of the Toyota Racing Series. The Toyota Racing Series is New Zealand's premier open-wheeler motorsport category. The Series includes races for every major trophy in New Zealand circuit racing including the New Zealand Motor Cup and the Denny Hulme Memorial Trophy. The cars are also the category for the 2008 New Zealand Grand Prix, which was held as the third race of the Manfeild Autocourse round, - one of only two races in the world with FIA approval to use the Grand Prix nomenclature outside Formula One.

== Teams and drivers ==
The following teams and drivers competed during the 2007–08 Toyota Racing Series. All teams were New Zealand-registered.

Team	No.	Driver	Rounds
International Motorsport	1	(New Zealand) Earl Bamber	All
International Motorsport	2	(New Zealand) Mitch Cunningham	All
International Motorsport	27	(New Zealand) Daniel Gaunt	2–3
Triple X Motorsport	3	(New Zealand) Matt Halliday	2–4
Triple X Motorsport	44	(Iceland) Kristján Einar	2–4
Knight Motorsport	5	(New Zealand) Andy Knight	All
Knight Motorsport	19	(New Zealand) Sam MacNeill	1, 5–7
Knight Motorsport	19	(New Zealand) Michael Pickens	2–4
Scorpion Racing	6	(New Zealand) Hamish Cross	All
Scorpion Racing	6	(Australia) Jason Bargwanna	NC
NZ Motorsport Trust	7	(New Zealand) Ben Harford	All
Motorsport Solutions	9	(New Zealand) Nic Jordan	All
Motorsport Solutions	74	(New Zealand) Michael Burdett	All
Motorsport Solutions	89	(New Zealand) John Whelan	NC
Ken Smith Motorsport	10	(New Zealand) Dominic Storey	All
Ken Smith Motorsport	11	(New Zealand) Ken Smith	All
Prviateer	20	(New Zealand) Daynom Templeman	3–4
Victory Motor Racing	28	(New Zealand) Nelson Hartley	1–5
D. J. Hewitt	40	(New Zealand) Matthew Hamilton	2
D. J. Hewitt	40	(New Zealand) Mark Munro	6–7
European Technique	47	(Australia) Nathan Antunes	All
Evans European	48	(Australia) Andrew Waite	NC
Mark Petch Motorsport	55	(New Zealand) Christina Orr	All
Ben Crighton Motorsport	87	(New Zealand) Ben Crighton	All

== Calendar ==
Round		Venue	Date	Pole position	Fastest lap	Winning driver	Winning team
2007
1	R1	Pukekohe Park Raceway (Pukekohe, Auckland Region)	2-4 November	(New Zealand) Andy Knight	(New Zealand) Andy Knight	(New Zealand) Andy Knight	Knight Motorsport
1	R2	Pukekohe Park Raceway (Pukekohe, Auckland Region)	2-4 November	(New Zealand) Andy Knight	(New Zealand) Nic Jordan	(New Zealand) Andy Knight	Knight Motorsport
1	R3	Pukekohe Park Raceway (Pukekohe, Auckland Region)	2-4 November		(New Zealand) Earl Bamber	(New Zealand) Andy Knight	Knight Motorsport
2008
2	R1	Powerbuilt Raceway at Ruapuna Park (Christchurch, Canterbury Region)	4-6 January			(New Zealand) Ben Harford	NZ Motorsport Trust
2	R2	Powerbuilt Raceway at Ruapuna Park (Christchurch, Canterbury Region)	4-6 January			(New Zealand) Andy Knight	Knight Motorsport
2	R3	Powerbuilt Raceway at Ruapuna Park (Christchurch, Canterbury Region)	4-6 January			(New Zealand) Earl Bamber	International Motorsport
3	R1	Manfeild Autocourse (Feilding, Manawatū District)	11-13 January	(New Zealand) Earl Bamber	(New Zealand) Matt Halliday	(New Zealand) Daniel Gaunt	International Motorsport
3	R2	Manfeild Autocourse (Feilding, Manawatū District)	11-13 January		(New Zealand) Earl Bamber	(New Zealand) Earl Bamber	International Motorsport
3	R3	Manfeild Autocourse (Feilding, Manawatū District)	11-13 January		(New Zealand) Nelson Hartley	(New Zealand) Andy Knight	Knight Motorsport
4	R1	Taupō Motorsport Park (Taupō, Taupō District)	18-20 January	(New Zealand) Ben Harford	(New Zealand) Matt Halliday	(New Zealand) Ben Harford	NZ Motorsport Trust
4	R2	Taupō Motorsport Park (Taupō, Taupō District)	18-20 January		(New Zealand) Michael Burdett	(New Zealand) Earl Bamber	International Motorsport
4	R3	Taupō Motorsport Park (Taupō, Taupō District)	18-20 January		(New Zealand) Dominic Storey	(New Zealand) Ben Harford	NZ Motorsport Trust
5	R1	Manfeild Autocourse (Feilding, Manawatū District)	15-17 February	(New Zealand) Earl Bamber	(New Zealand) Nelson Hartley	(New Zealand) Earl Bamber	International Motorsport
5	R2	Manfeild Autocourse (Feilding, Manawatū District)	15-17 February		(New Zealand) Andy Knight	(New Zealand) Andy Knight	Knight Motorsport
5	R3	Manfeild Autocourse (Feilding, Manawatū District)	15-17 February		(New Zealand) Earl Bamber	(New Zealand) Earl Bamber	International Motorsport
6	R1	Timaru International Motor Raceway (Timaru, Canterbury Region)	29 February-2 March	(New Zealand) Andy Knight	(New Zealand) Earl Bamber	(New Zealand) Earl Bamber	International Motorsport
6	R2	Timaru International Motor Raceway (Timaru, Canterbury Region)	29 February-2 March		(New Zealand) Ben Harford	(New Zealand) Earl Bamber	International Motorsport
6	R3	Timaru International Motor Raceway (Timaru, Canterbury Region)	29 February-2 March		(New Zealand) Earl Bamber	(New Zealand) Earl Bamber	International Motorsport
7	R1	Teretonga Park (Invercargill, Southland)	7-9 March	(New Zealand) Michael Burdett	(New Zealand) Earl Bamber	(New Zealand) Michael Burdett	Motorsport Solutions
7	R2	Teretonga Park (Invercargill, Southland)	7-9 March		(New Zealand) Ben Harford	(New Zealand) Ben Harford	NZ Motorsport Trust
7	R3	Teretonga Park (Invercargill, Southland)	7-9 March		(New Zealand) Earl Bamber	(New Zealand) Michael Burdett	Motorsport Solutions
NC	R1	Hamilton Street Circuit (Hamilton, Waikato District)	18-20 April	(New Zealand) Earl Bamber	(New Zealand) Andrew Waite	(New Zealand) Earl Bamber	International Motorsport
NC	R2	Hamilton Street Circuit (Hamilton, Waikato District)	18-20 April		(New Zealand) Earl Bamber	(New Zealand) Earl Bamber	International Motorsport

== Championship standings ==
Pos.	Driver	PUK			RUA			MAN1			TAU			MAN2			TIM			TER			HAM		Points
Pos.	Driver	R1	R2	R3	R1	R2	R3	R1	R2	R3	R1	R2	R3	R1	R2	R3	R1	R2	R3	R1	R2	R3	R1	R2	Points
1	(New Zealand) Andy Knight	1	1	1	3	1	16	3	5	1	6	3	11	2	1	Ret	2	2	2	2	4	2	3	4	1230
2	(New Zealand) Earl Bamber	13	4	12	2	Ret	1	5	1	5	3	1	3	1	3	1	1	1	1	6	5	3	1	1	1207
3	(New Zealand) Ben Harford	3	14	3	1	2	2	Ret	6	3	1	10	1	6	7	9	7	9	Ret	3	1	Ret			995
4	(New Zealand) Michael Burdett	10	13	5	12	Ret	4	10	4	8	4	2	Ret	11	12	7	11	3	3	1	2	1	9	12	901
5	(New Zealand) Nic Jordan	2	2	2	17	9	6	6	10	Ret	11	5	7	10	10	6	6	6	8	8	3	Ret	5	2	835
6	(New Zealand) Mitch Cunningham	12	3	10	6	Ret	15	15	14	12	13	7	4	4	9	10	5	4	7	4	6	5	2	Ret	803
7	(New Zealand) Dominic Storey	11	6	4	7	6	18	14	9	4	5	9	16	7	Ret	Ret	3	5	4	5	7	6			792
8	(New Zealand) Christina Orr	8	12	9	11	7	10	11	13	7	9	Ret	10	5	6	5	14	11	11	11	Ret	10	8	8	661
9	(New Zealand) Ken Smith	5	10	11	13	11	13	16	12	11	16	15	15	8	8	11	8	8	12	10	10	9	Ret	11	652
10	(New Zealand) Hamish Cross	9	8	8	10	Ret	9	9	8	9	8	8	8	12	DNS	4	9	Ret	10	DNS	8	11			626
11	(New Zealand) Nelson Hartley	7	7	Ret	9	5	17	2	11	Ret	7	6	2	3	2	3									625
12	(New Zealand) Ben Crighton	6	11	7	14	10	8	12	16	10	15	11	12	Ret	11	8	13	10	Ret	12	9	7	7	7	602
13	(New Zealand) Sam MacNeill	4	5	6							10	12	6	DNS	5	2	12	12	6	13	11	4	Ret	5	581
14	(Australia) Nathan Antunes	Ret	9	Ret	Ret	4	11	7	7	15	Ret	4	5	9	4	Ret	4	Ret	5	7	Ret	DNS	Ret	3	564
15	(New Zealand) Matt Halliday				5	3	3	4	3	2	2	Ret	Ret												417
16	(New Zealand) Daniel Gaunt				4	Ret	7	1	2	Ret															238
17	(New Zealand) Mark Munro																10	7	9	9	12	8	Ret	9	214
18	(New Zealand) Michael Pickens				16	12	12	DNS	17	14	14	13	14												192
19	(Iceland) Kristján Einar				15	13	14	13	Ret	13	Ret	14	13												174
20	(New Zealand) Daynom Templeman							8	15	6	12	Ret	9										4	Ret	170
21	(New Zealand) Matthew Hamilton				8	8	5																		127
-	(New Zealand) Andrew Waite																						6	6	0
-	(Australia) Jason Bargwanna																						Ret	10	0
-	(New Zealand) John Whelan																						Ret	Ret	0
Pos.	Driver	R1	R2	R3	R1	R2	R3	R1	R2	R3	R1	R2	R3	R1	R2	R3	R1	R2	R3	R1	R2	R3	R1	R2	Points
Pos.	Driver	PUK			RUA			MAN1			TAU			MAN2			TIM			TER			HAM		Points
