= Kristján Einar =

Icelandic racing driver

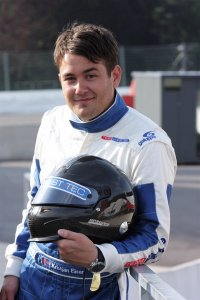
- Nationality: (Iceland) Icelandic
- Full name: Kristján Einar Kristjánsson
- Born: 8 January 1989 (age 37) Reykjavík (Iceland)

European F3 Open career
- Debut season: 2009
- Current team: Team West-Tec
- Car number: 22

Previous series
- 2008 2007–08: British Formula Three; Toyota Racing Series

Kristján Einar Kristjánsson (born 8 January 1989) is an Icelandic racing driver. He started racing in karts at the age of fourteen, the age when Icelandic law allows drivers to start racing karts. He is the first ever driver to emerge from Icelandic motorsport (karting) into full international formula racing series. Kristján is a podcast host of the podcast show The Pit along with Bragi "The B-Dog" Thordarson who is most often called The River Boy. Kristján's nickname in The Pit is The K-Seal.

== Karting career ==
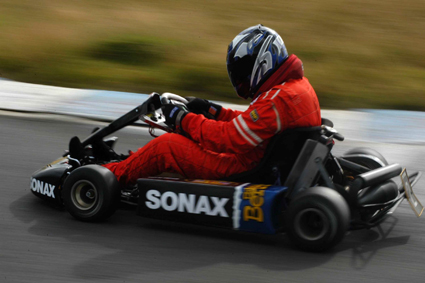
Einar karting.

Kristján was born in Garðabær. He started racing karts at the age of fourteen, the age when Icelandic law allows drivers to start racing karts. As the only teenager competing, Kristján finished eighth in his debut season of 2003, starting his racing career rolling his gokart(Video) .

The following year, Kristjan was back racing, this time finishing the 2004 season in fourth place, the following season finishing second and the highlight being the 2006 season, winning the Icelandic National karting championship, and still holding that title to date.

== Toyota Racing Series ==
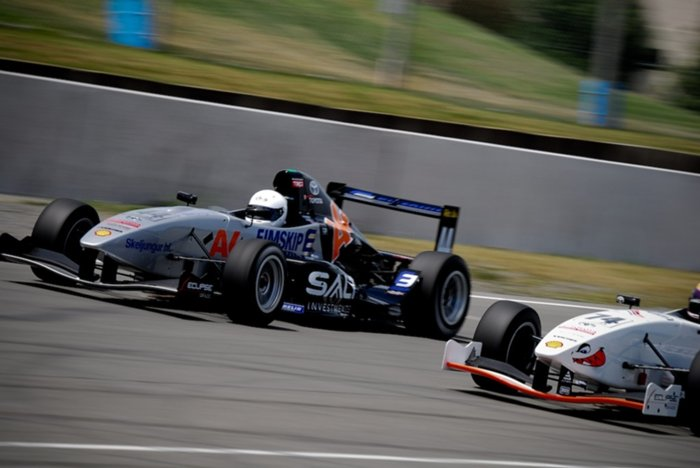
Einar competing in the Toyota Racing Series

To kick off his single-seater racing career, Kristján took advantage of southern hemisphere racing. During the winter break in the UK, and went to New Zealand to compete his first international races, finishing three rounds in the Toyota Racing Series; adding to his experience and getting quicker every lap, he earned the necessary racing experience he needed to start his season in the 2008 British Formula Three season. Einar teamed up with Matt Halliday at Triple X Motorsport.

== 2008 British Formula Three season ==
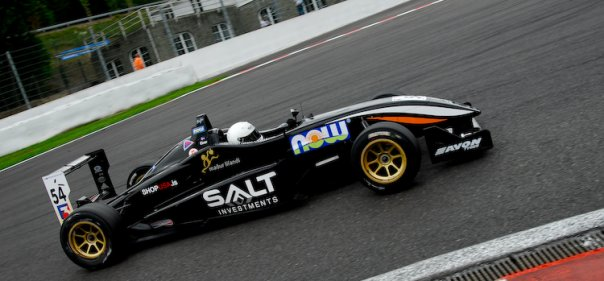
Einar competing during the 2008 British Formula Three season at Spa-Francorchamps.

Kristján's first full racing season was the 2008 British Formula Three season with Carlin Motorsport. Kristján's entry caught attention; a driver coming from a country with no racetrack and going almost directly from karting into the most successful British Formula Three team ever. Kristján raced in the national class, and scored his first podium at the third round of the season, at Monza. Kristján missed the last three races of the season, and finish seventh in the national class. Kristján was part of a very strong Carlin lineup, this helped him improve at a very fast pace, Kristján's teammate in the national class was Andrew Meyrick and Carlin's championship lineup was Jaime Alguersuari, Brendon Hartley, Oliver Turvey and Sam Abay.

== 2009 European F3 Open season ==
For 2009, Kristján inked a last minute deal with British racing team West-Tec, to race in the 2009 European F3 Open Championship, teaming up with team mates Christian Ebbesvik and Callum MacLeod. Kristján races in a Dallara 306 chassis, allowing him to compete for both overall honors, and the Copa cup. Kristján scored his first podium of the season at Donington Park.

== Testing ==
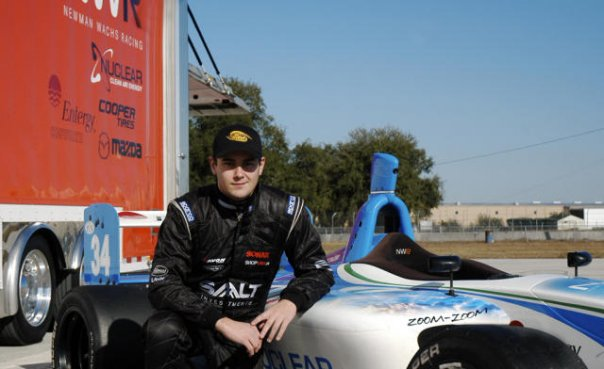
Einar at an Atlantic Championship test.

Kristján started his career testing Formula BMW with Carlin Motorsport for the second half of the 2007 season, aiming at entering the 2008 Formula BMW UK championship. When the FBMW UK changed into Formula BMW Europe Kristján was offered to test more powerful cars with Carlin Motorsport and seven months to the day he first drove a single seater, he was on the grid of the British Formula 3.

After a full year of successful racing in Britain, Kristján started looking elsewhere, and headed off to the USA, to test for the famous Newman Wachs Racing for the Atlantic Championship. After a good outing at Sebring International Raceway Kristján was about to sign up for the 2009 Atlantic Championship season when sponsorship fell through.

Kristján has always had a passion for sportscars, and in 2009, he was offered to try out the new Formula Le Mans Cup prototype at the Paul Ricard Circuit in France.

== Career results ==
=== Career summary ===
Season	Series	Team	Races	Wins	Poles	F/laps	Podiums	Points	Position
2008	Toyota Racing Series	Triple X Motorsport	9	0	0	0	0	174	19th
2008	British Formula 3 International Series - National Class	Carlin Motorsport	20	0	0	0	1	101	7th
2009	European F3 Open Championship	Team West-Tec	12	0	0	0	0	0	24th
2009	European F3 Open Championship - Copa F306/300	Team West-Tec	12	0	0	0	1	20	9th
2010	European F3 Open Championship	Team West-Tec	2	0	0	0	0	0	23rd
2010	European F3 Open Championship - Copa F306/300	Team West-Tec	2	0	0	0	0	4	11th
