= 2016 Australian GT Championship =

Motor racing event

Seasons
- ← 2015 2017 →

The 2016 CAMS Australian GT Championship was a CAMS-sanctioned Australian motor racing championship open to FIA GT3 cars. It was the 20th running of the Australian GT Championship. The championship began on 3 March 2016 at the Adelaide Street Circuit and ended on 13 November at Highlands Motorsport Park, with five rounds held in Australia and one round in New Zealand.

The 2016 season marked an expansion in Australian GT racing, with a separate endurance championship, the CAMS Australian Endurance Championship, being run for GT cars for the first time. A third series for older-specification GT3 and GT4 class cars, the CAMS Australian GT Trophy Series, was also held.

The Australian GT Championship events were held in support of V8 Supercar events, as part of rounds of the Shannons Nationals Motor Racing Championships and as self-promoted events. The Australian Endurance Championship also shared events with V8 Supercars and the Shannons Nationals, though its final two rounds were staged at Hampton Downs and Highlands Motorsport Park, both owned by series owner Tony Quinn. The Australian GT Trophy Series was contested exclusively at Shannons Nationals events.

Klark Quinn won the Australian GT Championship, Grant Denyer and Nathan Morcom were awarded the Australian Endurance Championship and Rob Smith won the Australian GT Trophy Series.

== Series ==
The 2016 season included three separate series:

- CAMS Australian GT Championship, shorter races for current-specification GT3 cars.
- CAMS Australian Endurance Championship, longer endurance races featuring multiple drivers and current-specification GT3 cars.
- CAMS Australian GT Trophy Series, shorter races for older-specification GT3 and GT4 cars.

All competitors were able to enter the Australian GT Championship and the Australian Endurance Championship, and all were eligible to win the championships outright, however only older-specification cars could enter the Australian GT Trophy Series.

== Teams and drivers ==
=== Australian GT Championship ===
Team	Vehicle	No.	Drivers	Class	Events
JAMEC PEM Racing	Audi R8 LMS	1	(Germany) Christopher Mies	GT	1–2, 5–6
JAMEC PEM Racing	Audi R8 LMS	1	(Australia) Geoff Emery	GT	1–3
JAMEC PEM Racing	Audi R8 LMS	1	(Italy) Marco Bonanomi	GT	3
JAMEC PEM Racing	Audi R8 LMS	1	(Spain) Miguel Molina	GT	4
JAMEC PEM Racing	Audi R8 LMS	1	(Australia) Tony Bates	GT	4–6
JAMEC PEM Racing	Audi R8 LMS	2	(Australia) Steve McLaughlan	GT	All
JAMEC PEM Racing	Audi R8 LMS	2	(Australia) Garth Tander	GT	4, 6
Team ASR	Audi R8 LMS	3	(Australia) Ash Samadi	GT	5–6
Team ASR	Mercedes-Benz SLS AMG GT3	9	(Australia) Ash Samadi	GT	1–4
Supabarn Supermarkets	Audi R8 LMS	4	(Australia) James Koundouris	GT	All
Supabarn Supermarkets	Audi R8 LMS	4	(Australia) Marcus Marshall	GT	All
GT Motorsport	Audi R8 LMS	5	(Australia) Gregg Taylor	GT	All
GT Motorsport	Audi R8 LMS	5	(Australia) Barton Mawer	GT	3
GT Motorsport	Audi R8 LMS	5	(Italy) Marco Bonanomi	GT	4
Skwirk Online Education	Audi R8 LMS Ultra	6	(Australia) Rod Salmon	GT	1–2
Skwirk Online Education	Audi R8 LMS Ultra	6	(Australia) Jake Fouracre	GT	4
Skwirk Online Education	Audi R8 LMS Ultra	6	(Australia) Liam Talbot	GT	4
Darrell Lea	Aston Martin V12 Vantage GT3	7	(New Zealand) Daniel Gaunt	GT	4
Darrell Lea	Aston Martin V12 Vantage GT3	7	(New Zealand) Greg Murphy	GT	6
Darrell Lea	Aston Martin V12 Vantage GT3	7	(United Kingdom) Tony Quinn	GT	2–6
Darrell Lea	McLaren 650S GT3	37	(United Kingdom) Tony Quinn	GT	1
Darrell Lea	McLaren 650S GT3	37	(Australia) Klark Quinn	GT	All
Darrell Lea	McLaren 650S GT3	37	(New Zealand) Shane van Gisbergen	GT	4
Darrell Lea	McLaren 650S GT3	37	(New Zealand) Mike Whiddett	GT	6
Maranello Motorsport	Ferrari 458 GT3	8	(Australia) Cameron McConville	GT	2, 4, 6
Maranello Motorsport	Ferrari 458 GT3	8	(Australia) Adrian Deitz	GT	2, 4, 6
Maranello Motorsport	Ferrari 458 GT3	80	(Australia) Tony D'Alberto	GT	4
Maranello Motorsport	Ferrari 458 GT3	80	(New Zealand) Graeme Smyth	GT	4
Maranello Motorsport	Ferrari 488 GT3	88	(Australia) Tony D'Alberto	GT	2
Maranello Motorsport	Ferrari 488 GT3	88	(Australia) Peter Edwards	GT	2, 4, 6
Hallmarc Developments	Audi R8 LMS Ultra	9	(Australia) Marc Cini	GT	5
Objective Racing	McLaren 650S GT3	11	(Australia) Tony Walls	GT	All
Taplin Real Estate	Lamborghini Gallardo R-EX	14	(Australia) Andrew Taplin	GT	1–4, 6
Taplin Real Estate	Lamborghini Gallardo R-EX	14	(Australia) Dean Canto	GT	1–4, 6
Veloce Motorsport - ULX110	Porsche 997 GT3 Cup	15	(Australia) Keith Wong	GT-I	1
Hog's Breath Cafe / Griffith Corporation	Mercedes-AMG GT3	19	(Australia) Mark Griffith	GT	1–2, 4–6
Hog's Breath Cafe / Griffith Corporation	Mercedes-AMG GT3	19	(Australia) Scott Hookey	GT	5
Hog's Breath Cafe / Griffith Corporation	Mercedes-AMG GT3	19	(Australia) Shae Davies	GT	6
Rosso Verde Racing	Ferrari 458 GT3	21	(Republic of Ireland) Hector Lester	GT	2
Exotic Track Days	Mercedes-Benz SLS AMG GT3	21	(Australia) Scott Hookey	GT	3
Exotic Track Days	Mercedes-Benz SLS AMG GT3	21	(Australia) Ryal Harris	GT	3
JBS Australia	Lamborghini Gallardo R-EX	23	(Australia) Roger Lago	GT	All
Trass Family Motorsport	Ferrari 458 GT3	27	(New Zealand) Sam Fillmore	GT	6
Trass Family Motorsport	Ferrari 458 GT3	27	(Australia) Daniel Stutterd	GT	6
Clark Proctor Racing	Nissan GT-R Nismo GT3	30	(New Zealand) Andrew Porter	GT	6
Clark Proctor Racing	Nissan GT-R Nismo GT3	30	(New Zealand) Clark Proctor	GT	6
HBS Motorsports	Audi R8 LMS Ultra	33	(New Zealand) Simon Ellingham	GT	1–2, 4–6
HBS Motorsports	Audi R8 LMS Ultra	33	(New Zealand) Tim Miles	GT	2, 4, 6
Eggleston Motorsport	Mercedes-AMG GT3	38	(Hong Kong) Matt Solomon	GT	1–2
Eggleston Motorsport	Mercedes-AMG GT3	63	(Australia) Peter Hackett	GT	1, 4
Eggleston Motorsport	Mercedes-AMG GT3	63	(New Zealand) Dominic Storey	GT	1, 4
Koala Motorsport	Ferrari F430 GT3	43	(Australia) Brenton Griguol	GT-I	1–2
Koala Motorsport	Ferrari F430 GT3	43	(Australia) Tim Macrow	GT-I	1–2
M Motorsport	Lamborghini Gallardo FL2	46	(Australia) John Magro	GT	2
M Motorsport	Lamborghini Gallardo FL2	49	(Australia) John Magro	GT	1
M Motorsport	Lamborghini Gallardo FL2	49	(Australia) Hayden Cooper	GT	1
M Motorsport	Lamborghini Gallardo R-EX	48	(Australia) Justin McMillan	GT	All
M Motorsport	Lamborghini Gallardo R-EX	48	(Australia) Glen Wood	GT	All
DeFelice Homes	Ferrari 488 GT3	49	(Italy) Andrea Montermini	GT-I	2
DeFelice Homes	Ferrari 488 GT3	49	(Denmark) Benny Simonsen	GT-I	2
AMAC Motorsport	Porsche 997 GT3-R	51	(Australia) Andrew MacPherson	GT	1–2, 4–6
AMAC Motorsport	Porsche 997 GT3-R	51	(Australia) Brad Shiels	GT	4–6
Tekno Autosports	McLaren 650S GT3	59	(Australia) Grant Denyer	GT	1–2, 4–6
Tekno Autosports	McLaren 650S GT3	59	(Australia) Jonathon Webb	GT	1–3, 5
Tekno Autosports	McLaren 650S GT3	59	(Australia) Matt Kingsley	GT	3–4
Tekno Autosports	McLaren 650S GT3	59	(France) Côme Ledogar	GT	6
Tekno Autosports	McLaren 650S GT3	60	(Australia) Nathan Morcom	GT	All
Tekno Autosports	McLaren 650S GT3	61	(Australia) Nathan Antunes	GT	All
Tekno Autosports	McLaren 650S GT3	61	(Australia) Elliot Barbour	GT	All
Performance West	Lamborghini Gallardo FL2	62	(Australia) Peter Rullo	GT	2–5
Performance West	Lamborghini Gallardo FL2	62	(Australia) Alex Rullo	GT	2, 4–5
Triffid Bar Venue	Lamborghini Gallardo R-EX	73	(New Zealand) Jaxon Evans	GT	6
Triffid Bar Venue	Lamborghini Gallardo R-EX	73	(Australia) Michael Hovey	GT	6
MARC GT	BMW M6 GT3	90	(Australia) Morgan Haber	GT	4
MARC GT	BMW M6 GT3	90	(Canada) Bruno Spengler	GT	4
Modena Engineering	BMW Z4 GT3	92	(Australia) Ricky Capo	GT	1–5
Waltec Motorsport	Porsche 997 GT3-R	93	(Australia) John Martin	GT	1–2
Waltec Motorsport	Porsche 997 GT3-R	93	(Australia) Aaron Tebb	GT	1–2
Miedecke Motor Group	Aston Martin V12 Vantage GT3	95	(Australia) Andrew Miedecke	GT	2, 4, 6
Miedecke Motor Group	Aston Martin V12 Vantage GT3	95	(Australia) George Miedecke	GT	2, 4
Fire Rating Solutions	Lamborghini Gallardo LP-560 GT3	99	(Australia) Matthew Turnbull	GT-I	2
BMW Team SRM	BMW M6 GT3	100	(New Zealand) Steven Richards	GT	All
BMW Team SRM	BMW M6 GT3	100	(Australia) Max Twigg	GT	All
ELF Lubicant Chesters Plumbing	Chevrolet Camaro GT	123	(New Zealand) Nick Chester	GT-I	6
ELF Lubicant Chesters Plumbing	Chevrolet Camaro GT	123	(New Zealand) Glenn Smith	GT-I	6
Scott Taylor Motorsport	Mercedes-AMG GT3	222	(New Zealand) Craig Baird	GT	All
Scott Taylor Motorsport	Mercedes-AMG GT3	222	(Australia) Scott Taylor	GT	1–5
Scott Taylor Motorsport	Mercedes-AMG GT3	222	(Australia) Michael Almond	GT	6
The Bend Motorsport Park	Lamborghini Gallardo R-EX	777	(Australia) Yasser Shahin	GT	4
Walkinshaw Racing	Porsche 911 GT3-R	911	(Australia) John Martin	GT	3–6
Walkinshaw Racing	Porsche 911 GT3-R	911	(Australia) Aaron Tebb	GT	3–4
Walkinshaw Racing	Porsche 911 GT3-R	911	(Australia) Neale Muston	GT	5
Walkinshaw Racing	Porsche 911 GT3-R	911	(Australia) Liam Talbot	GT	6

Class	Meaning
GT	Australian GT Championship
GT-I	Australian GT Championship (Invitational Class)

=== Australian Endurance Championship ===
Team	Vehicle	No.	Drivers	Class	Events
JAMEC PEM Racing	Audi R8 LMS	1	(Australia) Tony Bates	GT	All
JAMEC PEM Racing	Audi R8 LMS	1	(Spain) Miguel Molina	GT	1–2
JAMEC PEM Racing	Audi R8 LMS	1	(Germany) Christopher Mies	GT	3–4
JAMEC PEM Racing	Audi R8 LMS	2	(Australia) Steve McLaughlan	GT	1–2, 4
JAMEC PEM Racing	Audi R8 LMS	2	(Australia) Garth Tander	GT	1, 3–4
JAMEC PEM Racing	Audi R8 LMS	2	(Australia) Dean Koutsoumidis	GT	2
JAMEC PEM Racing	Audi R8 LMS	2	(Hong Kong) Daniel Bilski	GT	3
Team ASR	Audi R8 LMS	3	(Australia) Ash Samadi	GT	2–4
Team ASR	Audi R8 LMS	3	(Australia) Tony D'Alberto	GT	2–4
Supabarn Supermarkets	Audi R8 LMS	4	(Australia) Marcus Marshall	GT	All
Supabarn Supermarkets	Audi R8 LMS	4	(Australia) James Koundouris	GT	1
Supabarn Supermarkets	Audi R8 LMS	4	(Australia) Theo Koundouris	GT	2–4
GT Motorsport	Audi R8 LMS	5	(Australia) Gregg Taylor	GT	All
GT Motorsport	Audi R8 LMS	5	(Italy) Marco Bonanomi	GT	1
GT Motorsport	Audi R8 LMS	5	(Australia) Nathan Antunes	GT	2–4
Skwirk Online Education	Audi R8 LMS Ultra	6	(Australia) Jake Fouracre	GT	All
Skwirk Online Education	Audi R8 LMS Ultra	6	(Australia) Liam Talbot	GT	All
Darrell Lea	Aston Martin V12 Vantage GT3	7	(United Kingdom) Tony Quinn	GT	All
Darrell Lea	Aston Martin V12 Vantage GT3	7	(Australia) Hayden Cooper	GT	2
Darrell Lea	Aston Martin V12 Vantage GT3	7	(New Zealand) Greg Murphy	GT	3–4
Darrell Lea	Aston Martin V12 Vantage GT3	7	(New Zealand) Daniel Gaunt	GT	1
Darrell Lea	McLaren 650S GT3	37	(New Zealand) Daniel Gaunt	GT	2
Darrell Lea	McLaren 650S GT3	37	(Australia) Klark Quinn	GT	All
Darrell Lea	McLaren 650S GT3	37	(New Zealand) Shane van Gisbergen	GT	1
Darrell Lea	McLaren 650S GT3	37	(New Zealand) Mike Whiddett	GT	3–4
Maranello Motorsport	Ferrari 458 GT3	8	(Australia) Cameron McConville	GT	All
Maranello Motorsport	Ferrari 458 GT3	8	(Australia) Adrian Deitz	GT	All
Maranello Motorsport	Ferrari 458 GT3	80	(Australia) Tony D'Alberto	GT	1
Maranello Motorsport	Ferrari 458 GT3	80	(New Zealand) Graeme Smyth	GT	1
Maranello Motorsport	Ferrari 488 GT3	88	(Australia) Peter Edwards	GT	All
Maranello Motorsport	Ferrari 488 GT3	88	(Australia) John Bowe	GT	1–2, 4
Maranello Motorsport	Ferrari 488 GT3	88	(New Zealand) Graeme Smyth	GT	3
Objective Racing	McLaren 650S GT3	11	(Australia) Warren Luff	GT	1–2
Objective Racing	McLaren 650S GT3	11	(Australia) Tony Walls	GT	1–2
Hog's Breath Cafe / Griffith Corporation	Mercedes-AMG GT3	19	(Australia) Mark Griffith	GT	All
Hog's Breath Cafe / Griffith Corporation	Mercedes-AMG GT3	19	(Australia) Ryal Harris	GT	1
Hog's Breath Cafe / Griffith Corporation	Mercedes-AMG GT3	19	(Hong Kong) Matt Solomon	GT	2
Hog's Breath Cafe / Griffith Corporation	Mercedes-AMG GT3	19	(Australia) Jack Perkins	GT	3
Hog's Breath Cafe / Griffith Corporation	Mercedes-AMG GT3	19	(Australia) Shae Davies	GT	4
JBS Australia	Lamborghini Gallardo R-EX	23	(Australia) Roger Lago	GT	1–3
JBS Australia	Lamborghini Gallardo R-EX	23	(Australia) David Russell	GT	1–3
Trass Family Motorsport	Ferrari 458 GT3	27	(New Zealand) Sam Fillmore	GT	3–4
Trass Family Motorsport	Ferrari 458 GT3	27	(Australia) Daniel Stutterd	GT	3–4
Trofeo Motorsport	Lamborghini Huracán GT3	29	(Australia) Jim Manolios	GT	2
Trofeo Motorsport	Lamborghini Huracán GT3	29	(Australia) Ryan Millier	GT	2
Clark Proctor Racing	Nissan GT-R Nismo GT3	30	(New Zealand) Andrew Porter	GT	3–4
Clark Proctor Racing	Nissan GT-R Nismo GT3	30	(New Zealand) Clark Proctor	GT	3–4
HBS Motorsports	Audi R8 LMS Ultra	33	(New Zealand) Simon Ellingham	GT	All
HBS Motorsports	Audi R8 LMS Ultra	33	(New Zealand) Tim Miles	GT	All
Nissan GT Academy Team Kelly	Nissan GT-R Nismo GT3	35	(Australia) Michael Caruso	GT	3
Nissan GT Academy Team Kelly	Nissan GT-R Nismo GT3	35	(Australia) Matt Simmons	GT	3
M Motorsport	Lamborghini Gallardo R-EX	48	(Australia) Justin McMillan	GT	1–2, 4
M Motorsport	Lamborghini Gallardo R-EX	48	(Australia) Glen Wood	GT	1–2, 4
AMAC Motorsport	Porsche 997 GT3-R	51	(Australia) Andrew MacPherson	GT	All
AMAC Motorsport	Porsche 997 GT3-R	51	(Australia) Brad Shiels	GT	All
MARC Cars Australia	MARC Mazda3 V8	54	(Australia) Tony Alford	GT-I	1
MARC Cars Australia	MARC Mazda3 V8	54	(Australia) Beric Lynton	GT-I	1
MARC Cars Australia	BMW M6 GT3	90	(Australia) Morgan Haber	GT	1
MARC Cars Australia	BMW M6 GT3	90	(Canada) Bruno Spengler	GT	1
MARC Cars Australia	MARC Focus V8	91	(Australia) Jake Camilleri	GT-I	1
MARC Cars Australia	MARC Focus V8	91	(Papua New Guinea) Keith Hassulke	GT-I	1
MARC Cars Australia	MARC Mazda3 V8	94	(Australia) Nick Rowe	GT-I	1
MARC Cars Australia	MARC Mazda3 V8	94	(Australia) Jack Smith	GT-I	1
Tekno Autosports	McLaren 650S GT3	59	(Australia) Grant Denyer	GT	All
Tekno Autosports	McLaren 650S GT3	59	(Australia) Nathan Morcom	GT	All
Tekno Autosports	McLaren 650S GT3	60	(Australia) Matt Kingsley	GT	4
Tekno Autosports	McLaren 650S GT3	60	(France) Côme Ledogar	GT	4
Performance West	Lamborghini Gallardo FL2	62	(Australia) Alex Rullo	GT	1–2
Performance West	Lamborghini Gallardo FL2	62	(Australia) Nick Percat	GT	1
Performance West	Lamborghini Gallardo FL2	62	(Australia) Peter Rullo	GT	2
Eggleston Motorsport	Mercedes-AMG GT3	63	(Australia) Peter Hackett	GT	All
Eggleston Motorsport	Mercedes-AMG GT3	63	(New Zealand) Dominic Storey	GT	All
Triffid Bar Venue	Lamborghini Gallardo R-EX	73	(New Zealand) Jaxon Evans	GT	4
Triffid Bar Venue	Lamborghini Gallardo R-EX	73	(Australia) Michael Hovey	GT	4
Miedecke Motor Group	Aston Martin V12 Vantage GT3	95	(Australia) Andrew Miedecke	GT	2–3
Miedecke Motor Group	Aston Martin V12 Vantage GT3	95	(Australia) George Miedecke	GT	2–3
Miedecke Motor Group	Aston Martin V12 Vantage GT3	96	(Australia) Tony Longhurst	GT	3
Miedecke Motor Group	Aston Martin V12 Vantage GT3	96	(New Zealand) Richard Moore	GT	3
Miedecke Motor Group	Aston Martin V12 Vantage GT3	96	(Australia) Andrew Miedecke	GT	4
Miedecke Motor Group	Aston Martin V12 Vantage GT3	96	(Australia) George Miedecke	GT	4
BMW Team SRM	BMW M6 GT3	100	(New Zealand) Steven Richards	GT	1–3
BMW Team SRM	BMW M6 GT3	100	(Australia) Max Twigg	GT	1–3
ELF Lubicant Chesters Plumbing	Chevrolet Camaro GT	123	(New Zealand) Nick Chester	GT	3–4
ELF Lubicant Chesters Plumbing	Chevrolet Camaro GT	123	(New Zealand) John de Veth	GT	3
ELF Lubicant Chesters Plumbing	Chevrolet Camaro GT	123	(New Zealand) Glenn Smith	GT	4
Scott Taylor Motorsport	Mercedes-AMG GT3	222	(New Zealand) Craig Baird	GT	1–2, 4
Scott Taylor Motorsport	Mercedes-AMG GT3	222	(Australia) Scott Taylor	GT	1–2
Scott Taylor Motorsport	Mercedes-AMG GT3	222	(Australia) Michael Almond	GT	4
The Bend Motorsport Park	Lamborghini Gallardo R-EX	777	(Australia) Dean Canto	GT	1
The Bend Motorsport Park	Lamborghini Gallardo R-EX	777	(Australia) Yasser Shahin	GT	1
Walkinshaw Racing	Porsche 911 GT3-R	911	(Australia) John Martin	GT	3–4
Walkinshaw Racing	Porsche 911 GT3-R	911	(Australia) Duvashen Padayachee	GT	3–4

Class	Meaning
GT	Australian GT Championship
GT-I	Australian GT Championship (Invitational Class)

=== Australian GT Trophy Series ===
Team	Vehicle	No.	Drivers	Class	Events
GT Motorsport	Audi R8 LMS	1	(Australia) Greg Taylor	TR	1–3, 5
GT Motorsport	Audi R8 LMS	1	(Australia) Barton Mawer	TR	1
Grove Hire	Porsche 911 GT3 Cup	4	(Australia) Stephen Grove	TR-C	3
Safe-T-Stop	Porsche 911 GT3 Cup	6	(Australia) Adrian Flack	TR-C	3, 5
Safe-T-Stop	Porsche 911 GT3 Cup	6	(Australia) Richard Gartner	TR-C	3, 5
Fire Rating Solutions	Lamborghini Gallardo LP-560 GT3	9	(Australia) Matthew Turnbull	TR	1–3, 5
KPH Racing / OLOF Family Cosmetics	Porsche 911 GT3 Cup	12	(Australia) Ockert Fourie	TR-C	1–3, 5
KPH Racing / OLOF Family Cosmetics	Porsche 911 GT3 Cup	12	(Australia) Brendon Cook	TR-C	1, 3, 5
Travers Beynon	Audi R8 LMS	17	(Australia) Travers Beynon	TR	4–5
Trofeo Motorsport	Maserati Trofeo	29	(Australia) Jim Manolios	TR-C	1–2
Trofeo Motorsport	Maserati Trofeo	29	(Australia) Ryan Millier	TR-C	1–2
Tusk Windsor	Lamborghini Gallardo	31	(Australia) Francis Placentino	TR	1–2, 5
Tusk Windsor	Lamborghini Gallardo	31	(Australia) Tim Macrow	TR	5
Exotic Track Days	Ferrari 458 Challenge	33	(Australia) Scott Hookey	TR-C	1, 3–5
Southern Star Developments	Audi R8 LMS	37	(Australia) Rob Smith	TR	All
Melbourne's Cheapest Cars	Porsche 911 GT3 Cup	38	(Australia) Kane Rose	TR	5
CCC Polished Concrete	Porsche 911 GT3 Cup	42	(Australia) Rick Mensa	TR	2–3
MARC Cars Australia	MARC Focus V8	54	(Australia) Tony Alford	TR-M	1
MARC Cars Australia	MARC Focus V8	66	(Australia) John Goodacre	TR-M	5
MARC Cars Australia	MARC Focus V8	91	(Papua New Guinea) Keith Kassulke	TR-M	3–5
MARC Cars Australia	MARC Focus V8	91	(Australia) Ryan McLeod	TR-M	3
MARC Cars Australia	MARC Focus V8	92	(Australia) Michael Benton	TR-M	1, 4–5
MARC Cars Australia	MARC Focus V8	92	(Australia) Bruce Williams	TR-M	1
MARC Cars Australia	MARC Focus V8	92	(Australia) Morgan Haber	TR-M	2
MARC Cars Australia	MARC Focus V8	92	(Australia) Tony Longhurst	TR-M	2
MARC Cars Australia	MARC Focus V8	95	(United Kingdom) Sam Gerrard	TR-M	1, 4–5
MARC Cars Australia	MARC Focus V8	95	(Australia) Geoff Taunton	TR-M	1, 3
MARC Cars Australia	MARC Focus V8	95	(Australia) Jason Busk	TR-M	3–5
MARC Cars Australia	MARC Focus V8	96	(Australia) Adrian Deitz	TR-M	3
MARC Cars Australia	MARC Focus V8	96	(Australia) Morgan Haber	TR-M	4
MARC Cars Australia	MARC Focus V8	96	(Australia) Rob Thomson	TR-M	4
MARC Cars Australia	MARC Mazda3 V8	93	(Australia) Jake Camilleri	TR-M	All
MARC Cars Australia	MARC Mazda3 V8	94	(Australia) Morgan Haber	TR-M	1
MARC Cars Australia	MARC Mazda3 V8	94	(Australia) Jimmy Vernon	TR-M	1
MARC Cars Australia	MARC Mazda3 V8	94	(Australia) Nick Rowe	TR-M	2
MARC Cars Australia	MARC Mazda3 V8	94	(Australia) Jack Smith	TR-M	3–5
MARC Cars Australia	MARC Mazda3 V8	95	(Australia) Jack Smith	TR-M	2
Warrin Mining Volvo CE	Porsche 911 GT3 Cup	60	(Australia) Jed Wallis	TR	1
Warrin Mining Volvo CE	Porsche 911 GT3 Cup	60	(Australia) Adam Wallis	TR	1
Melbourne Performance Centre	Dodge Viper	66	(Australia) Garth Rainsbury	TR	1
Melbourne Performance Centre	Dodge Viper	66	(Australia) Ben Porter	TR	1
Whitlock Bull Bars	Audi R8 LMS	72	(Australia) Con Whitlock	TR	1
JJA Consulting Group	Lamborghini Gallardo LP-560 GT3	77	(Australia) Jan Jinadasa	TR	1, 4

Class	Meaning
TR	Australian GT Trophy Series
TR-C	Australian GT Trophy Series (Challenge Class)
TR-M	Australian GT Trophy Series (MARC Class)

== Race calendar ==
The Australian GT Championship was contested over six rounds, the Australian Endurance Championship over four rounds and the Australian GT Trophy Series over five rounds. Each race, with the exception of the Australian Grand Prix round of the Australian GT Championship, included at least one compulsory timed pit stop. The exception was the Australian Grand Prix round where drivers seeded time was added to the final race time.

=== Australian GT Championship ===
Round	Circuit	Location	Race format	Date
1	Adelaide Street Circuit	Adelaide, South Australia	3 x 40 min	3–6 March
2	Melbourne Grand Prix Circuit	Melbourne, Victoria	4 x 25 min	17–20 March
3	Barbagallo Raceway	Perth, Western Australia	2 x 60 min	6–8 May
4	Phillip Island Grand Prix Circuit	Phillip Island, Victoria	2 x 60 min	27–28 May
5	Townsville Street Circuit	Townsville, Queensland	2 x 60 min	8–10 July
6	Highlands Motorsport Park	Cromwell, New Zealand	2 x 60 min	11–12 November

=== Australian Endurance Championship ===
Round	Circuit	Location	Race format	Date
1	Phillip Island Grand Prix Circuit	Phillip Island, Victoria	101 laps	28–29 May
2	Sydney Motorsport Park	Eastern Creek, New South Wales	101 laps	26–28 August
3	Hampton Downs Motorsport Park	Waikato, New Zealand	101 laps	28–30 October
4	Highlands Motorsport Park	Cromwell, New Zealand	101 laps	13 November

=== Australian GT Trophy Series ===
Round	Circuit	Location	Race format	Date
1	Sandown Raceway	Melbourne, Victoria	2 x 50 min	1–3 April
2	Winton Motor Raceway	Benalla, Victoria	2 x 50 min	10–12 June
3	Sydney Motorsport Park	Eastern Creek, New South Wales	2 x 50 min	1–3 July
4	Queensland Raceway	Ipswich, Queensland	2 x 50 min	29–31 July
5	Phillip Island Grand Prix Circuit	Phillip Island, Victoria	2 x 50 min	9–11 September

== Race results ==
=== Australian GT Championship ===
Round	Circuit	Pole position	Race 1 Winner	Race 2 Winner	Race 3 Winner	Race 4 Winner
1	Adelaide	No. 1 JAMEC PEM Racing	No. 23 JBS Australia	No. 4 Supabarn Supermarkets	No. 11 Objective Racing	not contested
1	Adelaide	(Germany) Christopher Mies (Australia) Geoff Emery	(Australia) Roger Lago	(Australia) James Koundouris (Australia) Marcus Marshall	(Australia) Tony Walls	not contested
2	Albert Park	No. 1 JAMEC PEM Racing	No. 222 Scott Taylor Motorsport	No. 60 Tekno Autosports	No. 38 Eggleston Motorsport	No. 4 Supabarn Supermarkets
2	Albert Park	(Germany) Christopher Mies (Australia) Geoff Emery	(Australia) Scott Taylor (New Zealand) Craig Baird	(Australia) Nathan Morcom	(Hong Kong) Matt Solomon	(Australia) James Koundouris (Australia) Marcus Marshall
3	Barbagallo	No. 1 JAMEC PEM Racing	No. 2 JAMEC PEM Racing	No. 222 Scott Taylor Motorsport	not contested	
3	Barbagallo	(Italy) Marco Bonanomi (Australia) Geoff Emery	(Australia) Steve McLaughlan	(Australia) Scott Taylor (New Zealand) Craig Baird	not contested	
4	Phillip Island	No. 37 Darrell Lea	No. 60 Tekno Autosports	No. 777 The Bend Motorsport Park	not contested	
4	Phillip Island	(Australia) Klark Quinn (New Zealand) Shane van Gisbergen	(Australia) Nathan Morcom	(Australia) Yasser Shahin	not contested	
5	Townsville	No. 1 JAMEC PEM Racing	No. 37 Darrell Lea	No. 11 Objective Racing	not contested	
5	Townsville	(Germany) Christopher Mies (Australia) Tony Bates	(Australia) Klark Quinn	(Australia) Tony Walls	not contested	
6	Highlands	No. 1 JAMEC PEM Racing	No. 222 Scott Taylor Motorsport	No. 61 Tekno Autosports	not contested	
6	Highlands	(Germany) Christopher Mies (Australia) Tony Bates	(Australia) Michael Almond (New Zealand) Craig Baird	(Australia) Nathan Antunes (Australia) Elliot Barbour	not contested	

=== Australian Endurance Championship ===
Round	Circuit	Pole position	Race winner
1	Phillip Island	No. 37 Darrell Lea	No. 59 Tekno Autosports
1	Phillip Island	(Australia) Klark Quinn (New Zealand) Shane van Gisbergen	(Australia) Nathan Morcom (Australia) Grant Denyer
2	Sydney	No. 911 Walkinshaw Racing	No. 95 Miedecke Motor Group
2	Sydney	(Australia) John Martin (Australia) Duvashen Padayachee	(Australia) George Miedecke (Australia) Andrew Miedecke
3	Hampton Downs	No. 23 JBS Australia	No. 23 JBS Australia
3	Hampton Downs	(Australia) Roger Lago (Australia) David Russell	(Australia) Roger Lago (Australia) David Russell
4	Highlands	No. 222 Scott Taylor Motorsport	No. 222 Scott Taylor Motorsport
4	Highlands	(Australia) Michael Almond (New Zealand) Craig Baird	(Australia) Michael Almond (New Zealand) Craig Baird

=== Australian GT Trophy Series ===
Round	Circuit	Pole position	Race 1 Winner	Race 2 Winner
1	Sandown	No. 66 Melbourne Performance Centre	No. 1 GT Motorsport	No. 1 GT Motorsport
1	Sandown	(Australia) Garth Rainsbury (Australia) Ben Porter	(Australia) Gregg Taylor (Australia) Barton Mawer	(Australia) Gregg Taylor (Australia) Barton Mawer
2	Winton	No. 1 GT Motorsport	No. 1 GT Motorsport	No. 93 MARC Cars Australia
2	Winton	(Australia) Gregg Taylor	(Australia) Gregg Taylor	(Australia) Jake Camilleri
3	Sydney	No. 1 GT Motorsport	No. 1 GT Motorsport	No. 1 GT Motorsport
3	Sydney	(Australia) Gregg Taylor	(Australia) Gregg Taylor	(Australia) Gregg Taylor
4	Ipswich	No. 93 MARC Cars Australia	No. 93 MARC Cars Australia	No. 94 MARC Cars Australia
4	Ipswich	(Australia) Jake Camilleri	(Australia) Jake Camilleri	(Australia) Jack Smith
5	Phillip Island	No. 1 GT Motorsport	No. 1 GT Motorsport	No. 1 GT Motorsport
5	Phillip Island	(Australia) Gregg Taylor	(Australia) Gregg Taylor	(Australia) Gregg Taylor

== Championship standings ==
=== Australian GT Championship ===
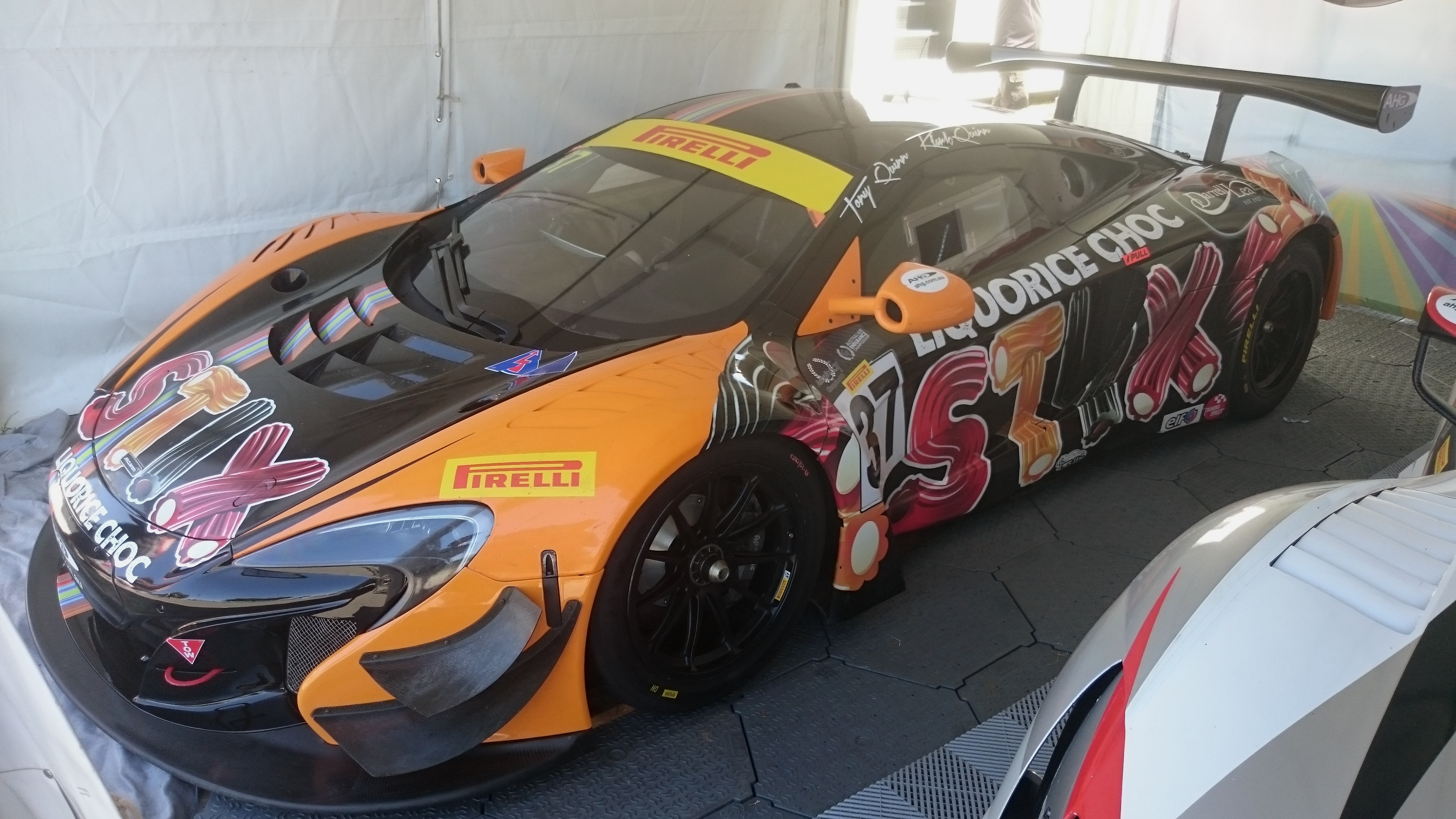
Klark Quinn won the 2016 Australian GT Championship driving a McLaren 650S GT3

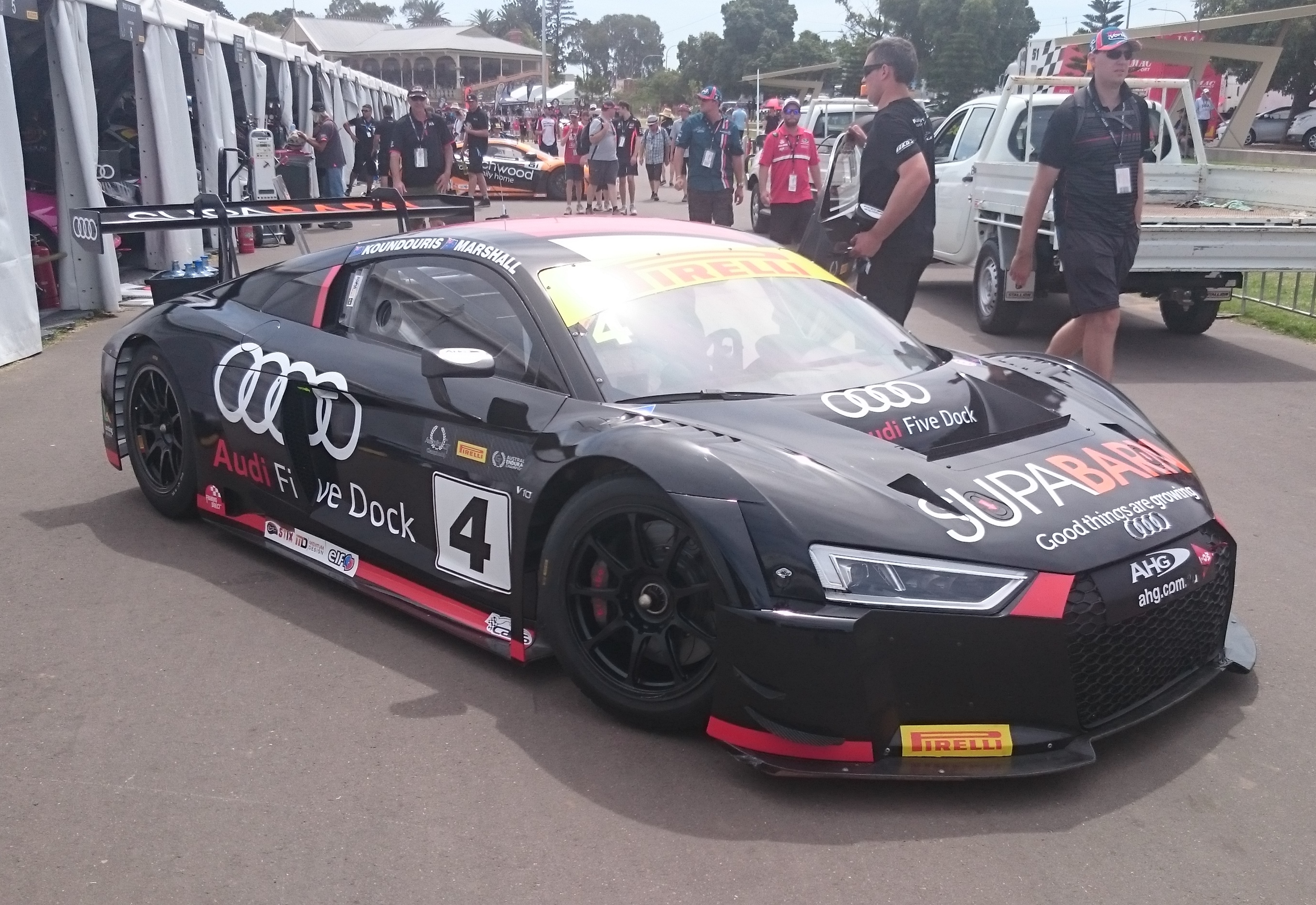
James Koundouris and Marcus Marshall placed fifth sharing an Audi R8 LMS

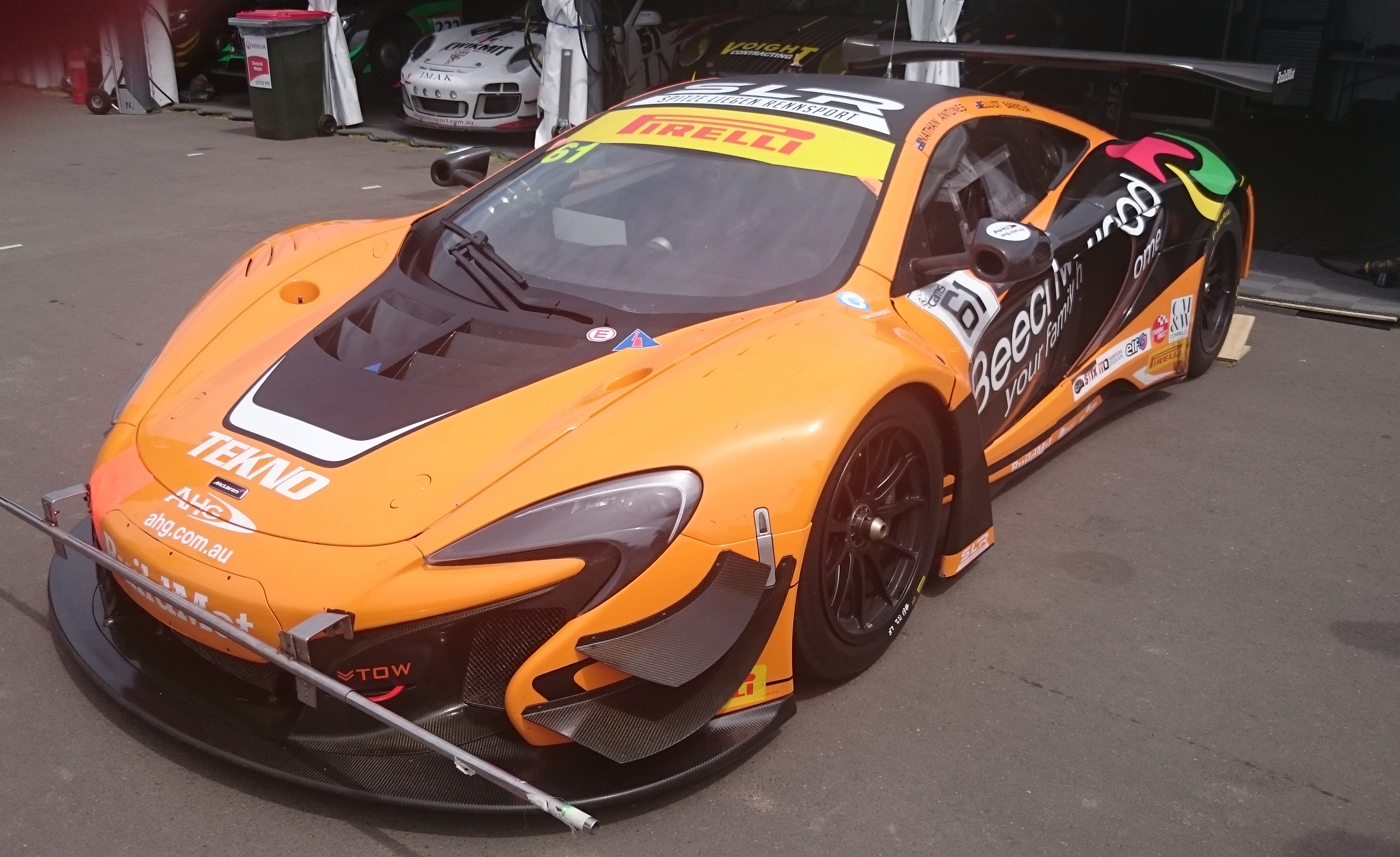
Nathan Antunes and Elliot Barbour placed sixth sharing a McLaren 650S GT3

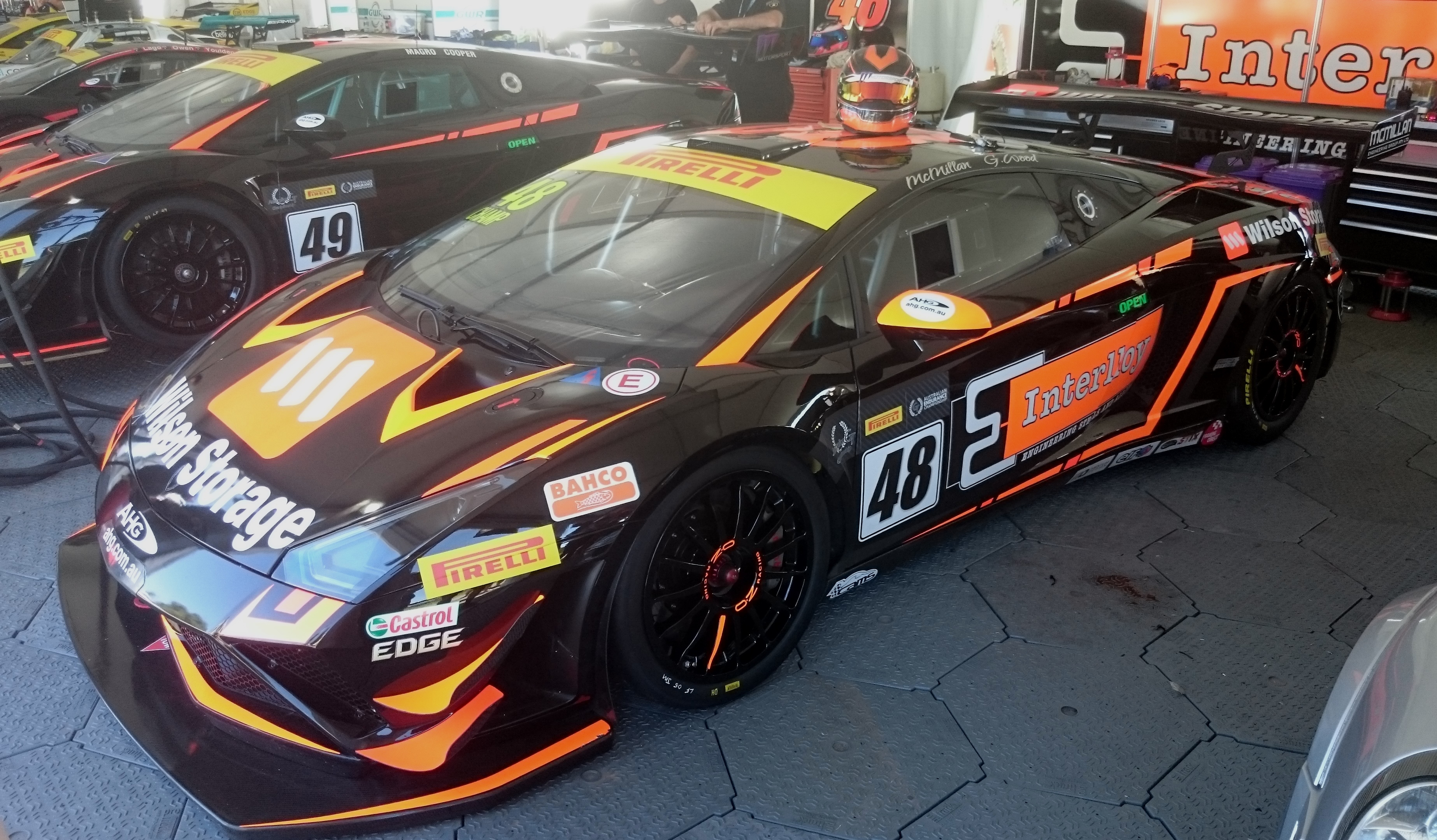
Justin McMillan & Glen Wood placed tenth sharing a Lamborghini Gallardo R-EX

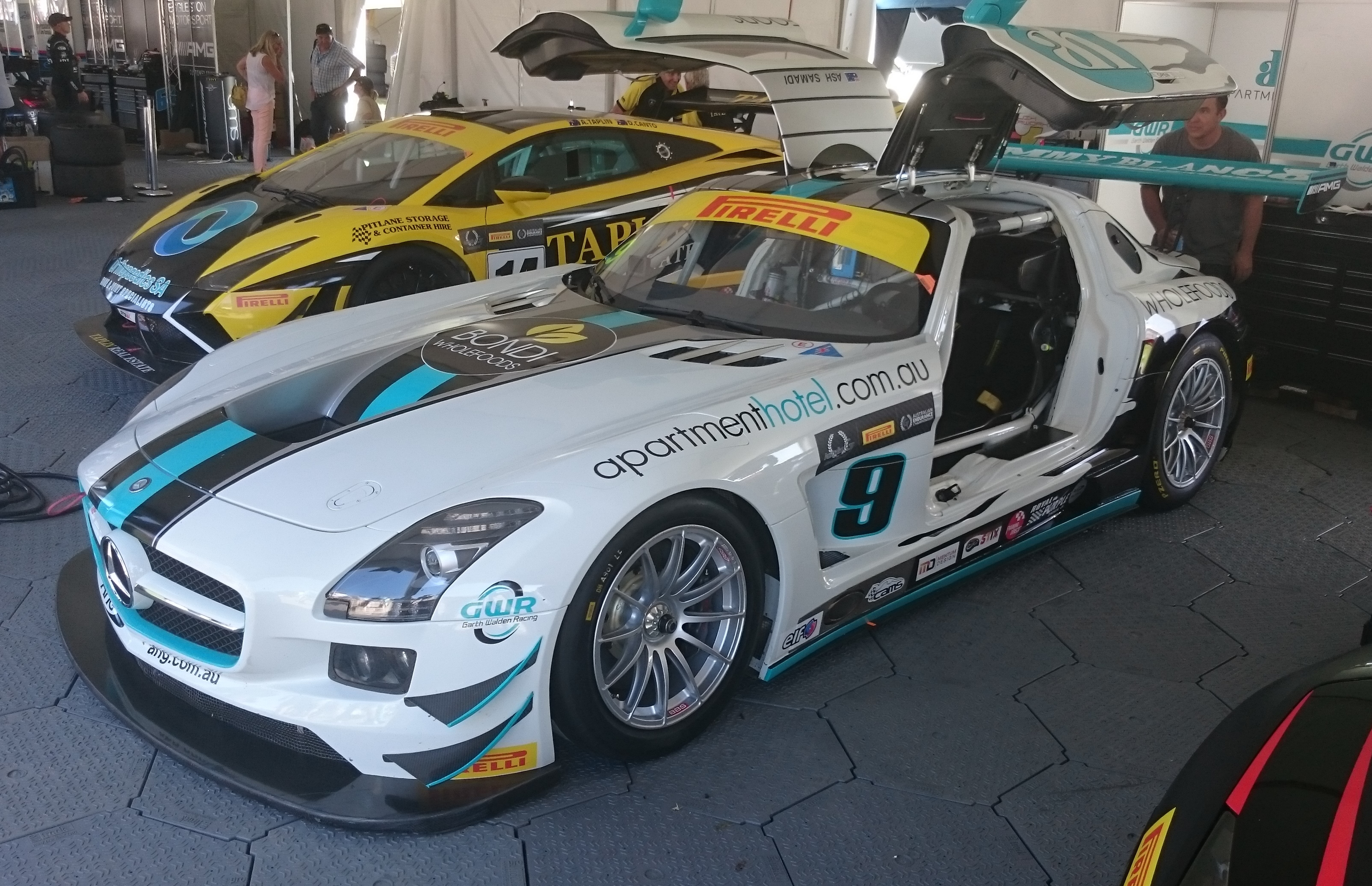
Ash Samadi placed 26th driving a Mercedes-Benz SLS AMG GT3 (pictured) and an Audi R8 LMS

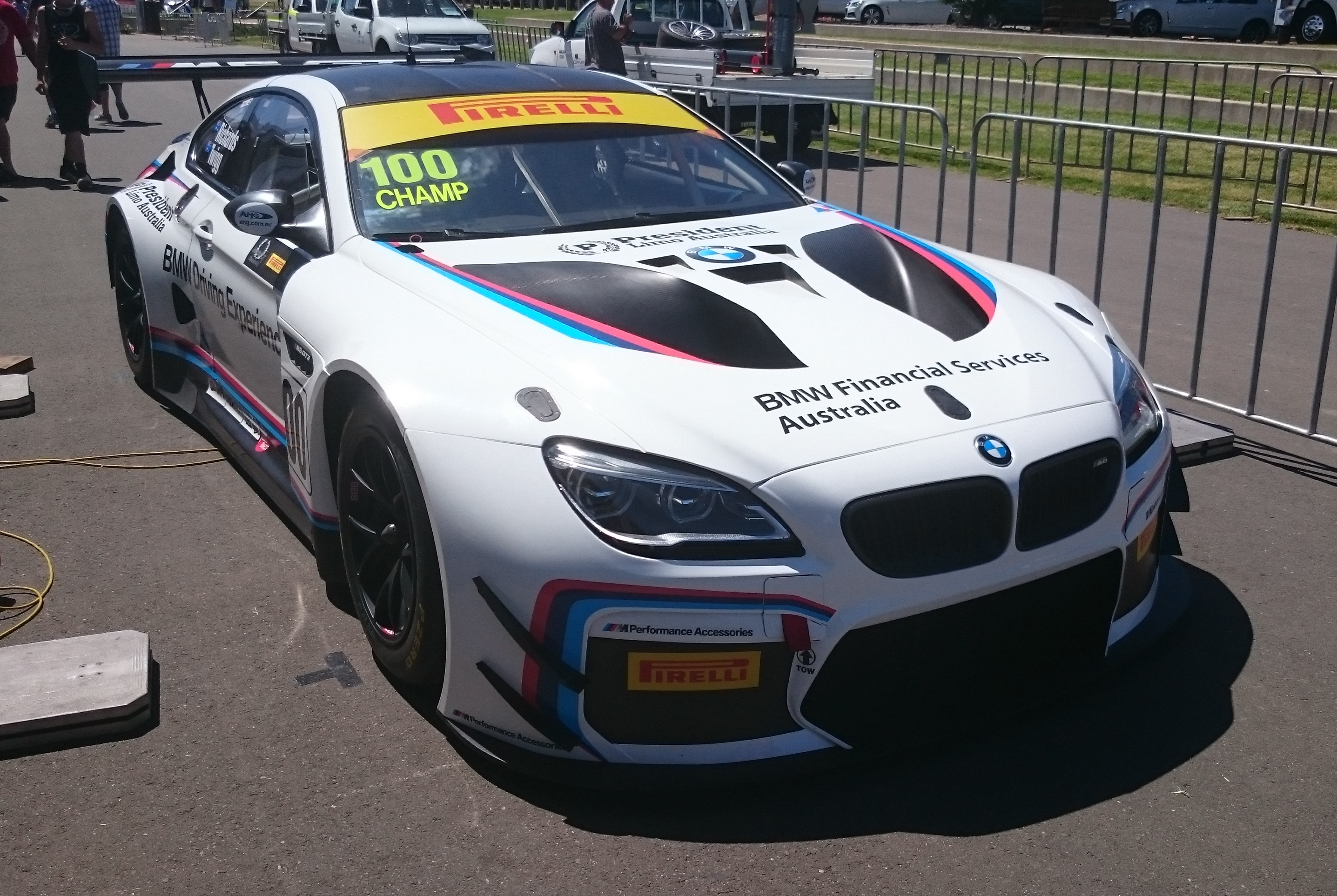
Steven Richards and Max Twigg placed 28th driving a BMW M6 GT3

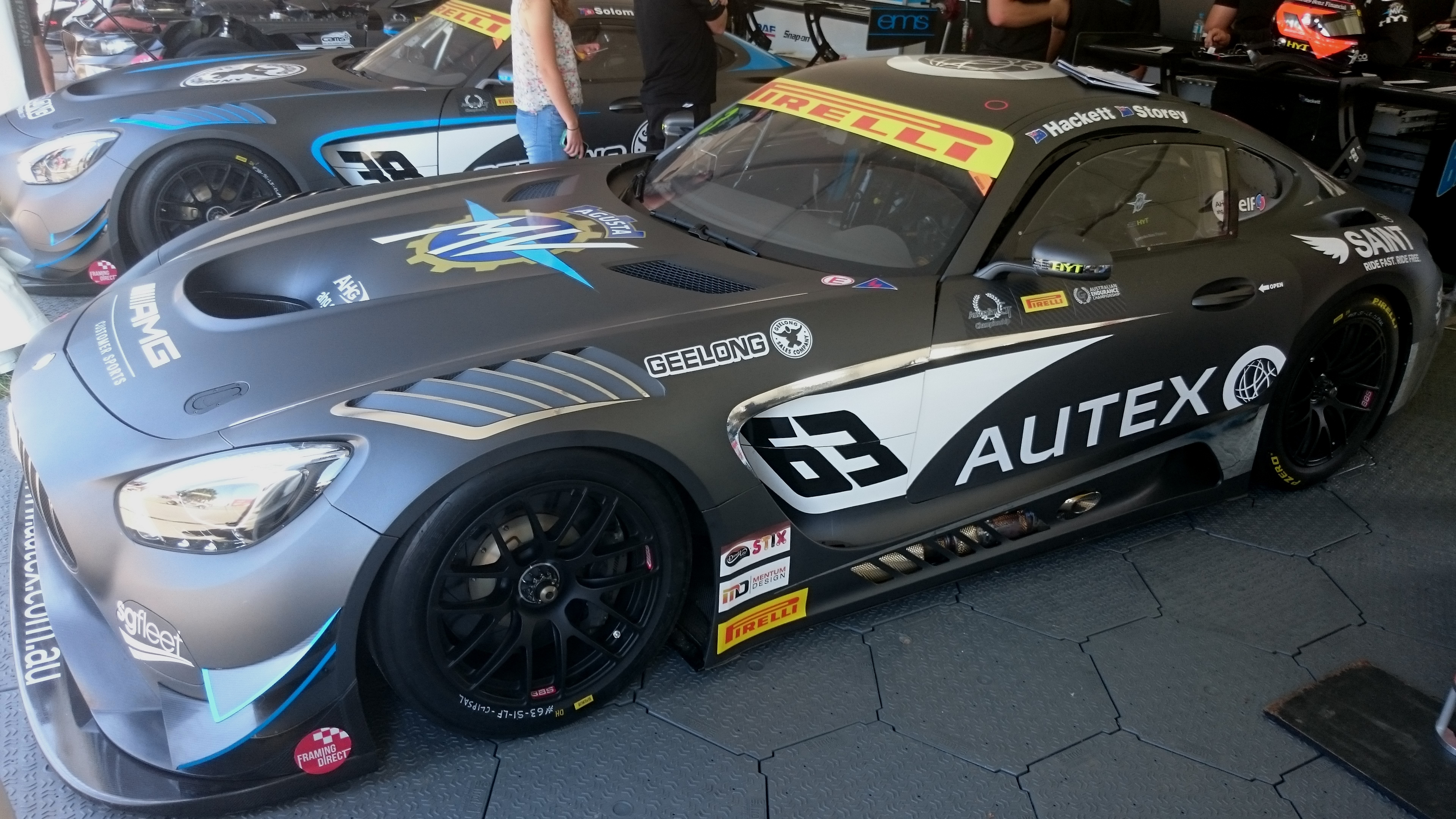
Peter Hackett and Dominic Storey placed 37th sharing a Mercedes-AMG GT3

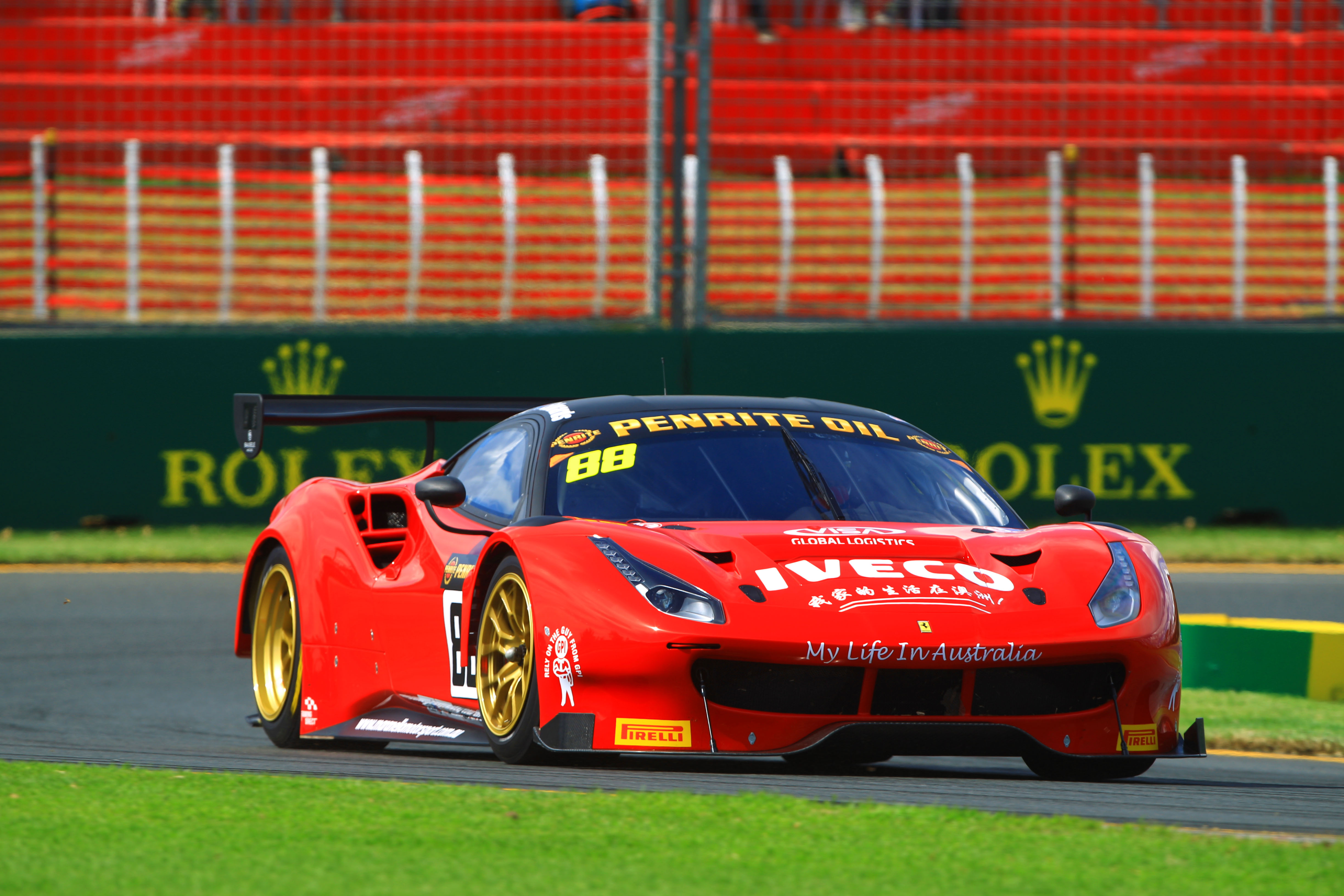
Peter Edwards placed 38th driving a Ferrari 458 GT3

Position	Driver	Car	Ade	Mel	Bar	Phi	Tow	Hig	Total
1	Klark Quinn	McLaren 650S GT3	105	99	129	61	150	83	627
2	Craig Baird	Mercedes-Benz AMG GT	62	66	127	39	93	194	581
3	Nathan Morcom	McLaren 650S GT3	93	97	131	124	87	49	581
4	Roger Lago	Lamborghini Gallardo R-EX	132	41	70	55	163	48	509
5	James Koundouris	Audi R8 LMS	101	121	98	14	84	60	478
=	Marcus Marshall	Audi R8 LMS	101	121	98	14	84	60	478
6	Elliot Barbour	McLaren 650S GT3	50	80	110	24	43	149	456
=	Nathan Antunes	McLaren 650S GT3	50	80	110	24	43	149	456
7	Steve McLaughlan	Audi R8 LMS	39	62	109	104	30	79	423
8	Tony Quinn	McLaren 650S GT3; Aston Martin Vantage	105	0	47	37	82	147	418
9	Tony Walls	McLaren 650S GT3	112	49	47	69	121	0	398
10	Justin McMillan	Lamborghini Gallardo R-EX	136	42	63	77	41	39	398
=	Glen Wood	Lamborghini Gallardo R-EX	136	42	63	77	41	39	398
11	Scott Taylor	Mercedes-Benz AMG GT	62	66	127	39	93	0	387
12	Grant Denyer	McLaren 650S GT3	57	71	0	77	71	100	376
13	John Martin	Porsche 997 GT3-R	35	74	111	23	83	3	329
14	Jonathon Webb	McLaren 650S GT3	57	71	78	0	71	-	277
15	Tony Bates	Audi R8 LMS	0	0	0	25	147	88	260
16	Greg Taylor	Audi R8 LMS	53	47	53	30	55	10	248
17	Aaron Tebb	Porsche 997 GT3-R	35	74	111	23	0	-	243
18	Geoff Emery	Audi R8 LMS	47	134	52	0	0	-	233
19	Andrew Taplin	Lamborghini Gallardo	60	34	48	28	0	43	213
=	Dean Canto	Lamborghini Gallardo	60	34	48	28	0	43	213
20	Ricky Capo	BMW Z4 GT3	46	35	19	105	5	-	210
21	Michael Almond	Mercedes-Benz AMG GT	194	-	-	-	-	-	194
22	Garth Tander	Audi R8 LMS	-	-	-	104	-	79	183
23	Matt Kingsley	McLaren 650S GT3	0	0	78	77	0	0	155
24	Greg Murphy	Aston Martin Vantage	-	-	-	-	-	147	147
25	Mark Griffith	Mercedes-Benz AMG GT	64	5	0	0	15	51	135
26	Ash Samadi	Mercedes-Benz AMG SLS; Audi R8 LMS	20	22	16	35	27	8	125
27	Andrew Miedecke	Aston Martin Vantage	0	82	0	35	0	0	117
=	George Miedecke	Aston Martin Vantage	0	82	0	35	0	0	117
28	Steven Richards	BMW M6 GT3	0	24	0	33	21	36	114
=	Max Twigg	BMW M6 GT3	0	24	0	33	21	36	114
29	Simon Ellingham	Audi R8 Ultra	45	41	0	10	7	1	104
30	Andrew MacPherson	Porsche 997 GT3-R	35	17	0	8	24	0	84
31	Neale Muston	Porsche 997 GT3-R	0	0	0	0	83	-	83
32	Adrian Deitz	Ferrari 458 GT3	0	37	0	31	0	13	81
=	Cameron McConville	Ferrari 458 GT3	0	37	0	31	0	13	81
33	Shane van Gisbergen	McLaren 650S GT3	-	-	-	61	-	-	61
34	Peter Rullo	Lamborghini Gallardo	0	4	36	7	10	-	57
35	Barton Mawer	Audi R8 LMS	0	0	53	0	0	-	53
36	Tim Miles	Audi R8 Ultra	0	41	0	10	0	1	52
37	Peter Hackett	Mercedes-AMG GT3	0	0	0	49	0	-	49
=	Dominic Storey	Mercedes-AMG GT3	0	0	0	49	0	-	49
38	Peter Edwards	Ferrari 458 GT3	0	0	0	8	0	38	46
39	Liam Talbot	Audi R8 LMS Ultra	0	0	0	42	0	3	45
=	Jake Fouracre	Audi R8 LMS Ultra	0	0	0	42	0	3	45
40	Daniel Gaunt	Aston Martin Vantage	-	-	-	37	-	-	37
41	Brad Shiels	Porsche 997 GT3-R	-	-	-	8	24	-	32
42	John Magro	Lamborghini Gallardo	15	16	0	0	0	-	31
43	Ryal Harris	Mercedes-Benz AMG SLS	0	0	29	0	0	-	29
44	Scott Hookey	Mercedes-Benz AMG SLS	0	0	0	0	15	-	15
45	Rod Salmon	Audi R8 Ultra	10	2	0	0	0	-	12
46	Alex Rullo	Lamborghini Gallardo	0	4	0	7	0	-	11

==== Gold Driver Cup ====
Position	Driver	Car	Ade	Mel	Bar	Phi	Tow	Hig	Total
1	Roger Lago	Lamborghini Gallardo R-EX	221	120	168	186	204	202	1101
2	Tony Walls	McLaren 650S GT3	184	143	157	185	172	-t	841
3	Ash Samadi	Mercedes-Benz AMG SLS; Audi R8 LMS	78	114	99	181	98	72	642
4	Greg Taylor	Audi R8 LMS	132	151	0	0	122	155	560
5	Steve McLaughlan	Audi R8 LMS	109	162	166	0	72	-	511
6	Peter Edwards	Ferrari 458 GT3	-	-	137	-	-	194	331
7	Tony Quinn	McLaren 650S GT3; Aston Martin Vantage	0	0	143	0	168	-	311
8	Mark Griffith	Mercedes-Benz AMG GT	155	52	0	6	0	-	213
9	Peter Rullo	Lamborghini Gallardo	0	0	155	0	56	-	211
10	Andrew MacPherson	Porsche 997 GT3-R	89	76	0	0	0	-	165
11	Rod Salmon	Audi R8 Ultra	67	22	0	0	0	-	89

The Gold Driver Cup was for drivers over 40 years of age, competing solo and ranked Pro 4 or below.

=== Australian Endurance Championship ===
Grant Denyer and Nathan Morcom were awarded the Australian Endurance Championship.

=== Australian GT Trophy Series ===
Rob Smith won the Australian GT Trophy Series.
