= 2010 Toyota Racing Series =

Motor racing competition

Seasons
- ← 2008–09 2011 →

The 2010 Toyota Racing Series was the sixth running of the Toyota Racing Series. The Toyota Racing Series is New Zealand's premier open-wheeler motorsport category. The Series included races for every major trophy in New Zealand circuit racing including the New Zealand Motor Cup and the Denny Hulme Memorial Trophy. The cars were also the category for the 2010 New Zealand Grand Prix, which was held as the third race of the Manfeild Autocourse round.

Teenager Mitch Evans claimed the title by just three points ahead of Earl Bamber, who won six races during the Series. Evans also claimed the International Trophy which consisted of the first four rounds of the championship.

== Teams and drivers ==
Team	No.	Driver	Rounds
Giles Motorsport	4	(New Zealand) Mitch Evans	All
Giles Motorsport	9	(New Zealand) Daniel Jilesen	All
Giles Motorsport	20	(Estonia) Sten Pentus	1–4
Giles Motorsport	28	(Brazil) Lucas Foresti	1–4
Knight Motorsport	6	(New Zealand) Andy Knight	3
Sam MacNeill Motorsport	6	(New Zealand) Sam MacNeill	4–5
Triple X Motorsport	6	(Australia) Chris Wootton	1
Triple X Motorsport	7	(New Zealand) Earl Bamber	All
Triple X Motorsport	41	(New Zealand) Stefan Webling	All
Neale Motorsport	8	(New Zealand) Jamie McNee	All
Ken Smith Motorsport	11	(New Zealand) Ken Smith	3–4
ETEC Motorsport	47	(Australia) Nathan Morcom	1–2
ETEC Motorsport	47	(New Zealand) Richie Stanaway	3–4
ETEC Motorsport	48	(New Zealand) Andrew Waite	All
Dart International	69	(New Zealand) Alastair Wootten	All

== Calendar ==
Round		Date	Location	Pole position	Fastest lap	Winning driver	Winning team
1	R1	16 January	Teretonga Park	(New Zealand) Mitch Evans	(New Zealand) Mitch Evans	(New Zealand) Mitch Evans	Giles Motorsport
1	R2	17 January	Teretonga Park	(New Zealand) Mitch Evans	(New Zealand) Mitch Evans	(Estonia) Sten Pentus	Giles Motorsport
1	R3	17 January	Teretonga Park		(Estonia) Sten Pentus	(Brazil) Lucas Foresti	Giles Motorsport
2	R1	23 January	Timaru International Motor Raceway	(New Zealand) Mitch Evans	(New Zealand) Mitch Evans	(New Zealand) Mitch Evans	Giles Motorsport
2	R2	24 January	Timaru International Motor Raceway	(New Zealand) Mitch Evans	(New Zealand) Earl Bamber	(New Zealand) Earl Bamber	Triple X Motorsport
2	R3	24 January	Timaru International Motor Raceway		(Brazil) Lucas Foresti	(New Zealand) Earl Bamber	Triple X Motorsport
3	R1	6 February	Hampton Downs Motorsport Park	(New Zealand) Mitch Evans	(New Zealand) Richie Stanaway	(New Zealand) Mitch Evans	Giles Motorsport
3	R2	7 February	Hampton Downs Motorsport Park		(New Zealand) Mitch Evans	(New Zealand) Andrew Waite	ETEC Motorsport
3	R3	7 February	Hampton Downs Motorsport Park	(New Zealand) Mitch Evans	(New Zealand) Richie Stanaway	(Estonia) Sten Pentus	Giles Motorsport
4	R1	13 February	Manfeild Autocourse	(New Zealand) Mitch Evans	(New Zealand) Earl Bamber	(New Zealand) Richie Stanaway	ETEC Motorsport
4	R2	14 February	Manfeild Autocourse		(Estonia) Sten Pentus	(New Zealand) Andrew Waite	ETEC Motorsport
4	R3	14 February	Manfeild Autocourse	(New Zealand) Mitch Evans	(Estonia) Sten Pentus	(New Zealand) Earl Bamber	Triple X Motorsport
5	R1	20 March	Taupo Motorsport Park	(New Zealand) Earl Bamber	(New Zealand) Mitch Evans	(New Zealand) Earl Bamber	Triple X Motorsport
5	R2	21 March	Taupo Motorsport Park		(New Zealand) Earl Bamber	(New Zealand) Earl Bamber	Triple X Motorsport
5	R3	21 March	Taupo Motorsport Park	(New Zealand) Earl Bamber	(New Zealand) Earl Bamber	(New Zealand) Earl Bamber	Triple X Motorsport

== Championship standings ==
Pos	Driver	TER			TIM			HMP			MAN			TAU			Points
1	(New Zealand) Mitch Evans	1	2	6	1	6	2	1	3	5	7	4	2	2	2	3	915
2	(New Zealand) Earl Bamber	6	6	2	6	1	1	3	2	4	11	5	1	1	1	1	912
3	(New Zealand) Andrew Waite	4	5	7	7	4	3	6	1	7	5	1	8	5	7	6	762
4	(Estonia) Sten Pentus	2	1	4	2	2	5	5	11	1	2	DSQ	3				660
5	(New Zealand) Daniel Jilesen	3	3	3	3	8	4	Ret	9	9	8	9	5	Ret	3	4	643
6	(New Zealand) Alastair Wootten	7	8	11	5	5	6	8	10	11	3	7	9	6	6	8	623
7	(New Zealand) Stefan Webling	11	9	8	9	3	9	7	12	6	10	10	11	7	5	2	606
8	(Brazil) Lucas Foresti	5	4	1	4	9	7	2	4	3	6	Ret	Ret				536
9	(New Zealand) Jamie McNee	8	7	5	Ret	Ret	8	Ret	5	10	12	6	6	4	Ret	5	472
10	(New Zealand) Richie Stanaway							4	6	2	1	2	4				362
11	(New Zealand) Sam MacNeill										4	3	7	3	4	7	312
12	(Australia) Nathan Morcom	9	10	9	8	7	10										219
13	(New Zealand) Ken Smith							9	7	12	9	8	10				214
14	(New Zealand) Andy Knight							Ret	8	8							78
15	(Australia) Chris Wootton	10	DNS	10													66
Pos	Driver	TER			TIM			HMP			MAN			TAU			Points

Colour	Result
Gold	Winner
Silver	Second place
Bronze	Third place
Green	Points classification
Blue	Non-points classification
Blue	Non-classified finish (NC)
Purple	Retired, not classified (Ret)
Red	Did not qualify (DNQ)
Red	Did not pre-qualify (DNPQ)
Black	Disqualified (DSQ)
White	Did not start (DNS)
White	Withdrew (WD)
White	Race cancelled (C)
Blank	Did not practice (DNP)
Blank	Did not arrive (DNA)
Blank	Excluded (EX)
