= 2008–09 Toyota Racing Series =

Motor racing competition

Seasons
- ← 2007–08 2010 →

The 2008–09 Toyota Racing Series was the fifth running of the Toyota Racing Series. The Toyota Racing Series is New Zealand's premier open-wheeler motorsport category. The Series includes races for every major trophy in New Zealand circuit racing including the New Zealand Motor Cup and the Denny Hulme Memorial Trophy. The cars are also the category for the 2009 New Zealand Grand Prix, which was held as the third race of the Manfeild Autocourse round, – one of only two races in the world with FIA approval to use the Grand Prix nomenclature outside Formula One.

Mitch Cunningham won the championship by over 100 points ahead of Sam MacNeill and Michael Burdett; finishing as the round winner in three of the six meetings.

== Teams and drivers ==
The following teams and drivers are competing during the 2008–09 Toyota Racing Series. All drivers compete in Tatuus TT104ZZ chassis.

Team	No.	Driver	Rounds
European Technique	1	(New Zealand) Andy Knight	4
European Technique	5	(Australia) Scott Pye	All
European Technique	47	(Australia) Nathan Antunes	1–3
European Technique	50	(China) Adderly Fong	2–3
Earl Bamber Racing	2	(New Zealand) Earl Bamber	4
Giles Motorsport	8	(United Kingdom) Will Stevens	2–4
Giles Motorsport	9	(New Zealand) Daniel Jilesen	All
Giles Motorsport	14	(New Zealand) Keeley Pudney	1–5
Giles Motorsport	14	(New Zealand) Richie Stanaway	NC
Giles Motorsport	28	(United Kingdom) William Buller	2–4
Giles Motorsport	32	(New Zealand) Mitch Cunningham	All
Ken Smith Motorsport	11	(New Zealand) Ken Smith	5–6
Motorsport Solutions	19	(New Zealand) Sam MacNeill	All
Motorsport Solutions	41	(New Zealand) Stefan Webling	NC
Motorsport Solutions	69	(New Zealand) Alastair Wootten	All
Motorsport Solutions	74	(New Zealand) Michael Burdett	All
Motorsport Solutions	89	(New Zealand) John Whelan	All
Privateer	20	(New Zealand) Daynom Templeman	NC
John McIntyre Racing	25	(New Zealand) John McIntyre	4
Triple X Motorsport	47	(New Zealand) Daniel Gaunt	5
Andrew Waite	48	(New Zealand) Andrew Waite	4–5
TRS Lites
Mitch Evans	4	(New Zealand) Mitch Evans	5, NC
Jamie McNee	8	(New Zealand) Jamie McNee	NC
Chris Cox	12	(New Zealand) Chris Cox	5, NC

== Calendar ==
Round		Date	Location	Pole position	Fastest lap	Winning driver	Winning team
2008
1	R1	28–30 November	Powerbuilt Raceway at Ruapuna Park	(Australia) Scott Pye	(New Zealand) Mitch Cunningham	(New Zealand) Michael Burdett	Motorsport Solutions
1	R2	28–30 November	Powerbuilt Raceway at Ruapuna Park		(Australia) Nathan Antunes	(Australia) Nathan Antunes	European Technique
1	R3	28–30 November	Powerbuilt Raceway at Ruapuna Park		(Australia) Scott Pye	(Australia) Scott Pye	European Technique
2009
2	R1	9-11 January	Timaru International Motor Raceway	(Australia) Scott Pye	(New Zealand) Michael Burdett	(United Kingdom) William Buller	Giles Motorsport
2	R2	9-11 January	Timaru International Motor Raceway		(Australia) Scott Pye	(Australia) Scott Pye	European Technique
2	R3	9-11 January	Timaru International Motor Raceway		(Australia) Scott Pye	(Australia) Scott Pye	European Technique
3	R1	16-18 January	Teretonga Park	(New Zealand) Mitch Cunningham	(Australia) Nathan Antunes	(Australia) Nathan Antunes	European Technique
3	R2	16-18 January	Teretonga Park		(Australia) Scott Pye	(New Zealand) Mitch Cunningham	Giles Motorsport
3	R3	16-18 January	Teretonga Park		(United Kingdom) William Buller	(United Kingdom) William Buller	Giles Motorsport
4	R1	23-25 January	Taupo Motorsport Park	(New Zealand) Mitch Cunningham	(New Zealand) Sam McNeill	(New Zealand) Mitch Cunningham	Giles Motorsport
4	R2	23-25 January	Taupo Motorsport Park		(United Kingdom) William Buller	(New Zealand) Michael Burdett	Motorsport Solutions
4	R3	23-25 January	Taupo Motorsport Park		(New Zealand) Michael Burdett	(New Zealand) Mitch Cunningham	Giles Motorsport
5	R1	27 February-1 March	Manfeild Autocourse	(New Zealand) Daniel Gaunt	(New Zealand) Daniel Gaunt	(New Zealand) Earl Bamber	Earl Bamber Racing
5	R2	27 February-1 March	Manfeild Autocourse		(New Zealand) Earl Bamber	(New Zealand) Daniel Gaunt	Triple X Motorsport
5	R3	27 February-1 March	Manfeild Autocourse		(New Zealand) Earl Bamber	(New Zealand) Daniel Gaunt	Triple X Motorsport
6	R1	13-15 March	Pukekohe Park Raceway	(New Zealand) Mitch Cunningham	(New Zealand) Mitch Cunningham	(New Zealand) Michael Burdett	Motorsport Solutions
6	R2	13-15 March	Pukekohe Park Raceway		(New Zealand) Mitch Cunningham	(New Zealand) Michael Burdett	Motorsport Solutions
6	R3	13-15 March	Pukekohe Park Raceway		(New Zealand) Mitch Cunningham	(New Zealand) Mitch Cunningham	Giles Motorsport
NC	R1	17-19 April	Hamilton Street Circuit	(New Zealand) Richie Stanaway	(New Zealand) Richie Stanaway	(New Zealand) Richie Stanaway	Giles Motorsport
NC	R2	17-19 April	Hamilton Street Circuit		(Australia) Nathan Antunes	(New Zealand) Richie Stanaway	Giles Motorsport

- NC – The Hamilton event is not part of the Toyota Racing Series Championship.

== Championship standings ==
Pos.	Driver	RUA			TIM			TER			TAU			MAN			PUK			HAM		Points
Pos.	Driver	R1	R2	R3	R1	R2	R3	R1	R2	R3	R1	R2	R3	R1	R2	R3	R1	R2	R3	R1	R2	Points
1	(New Zealand) Mitch Cunningham	4	2	2	2	3	4	2	1	2	1	3	1	11	3	13	2	8	1	Ret	4	1110
2	(New Zealand) Sam MacNeill	7	3	3	5	5	5	4	4	5	2	2	7	2	8	3	3	2	2	Ret	Ret	989
3	(Australia) Scott Pye	2	Ret	1	4	1	1	3	3	3	11	6	6	7	Ret	5	5	5	3			895
4	(New Zealand) Michael Burdett	1	Ret	8	6	4	3	7	7	10	3	1	3	3	4	6	1	1	Ret	2	2	879
5	(New Zealand) Daniel Jilesen	6	5	4	7	10	6	6	5	4	7	9	5	8	12	Ret	6	3	6	7	6	732
6	(New Zealand) Alastair Wootten	Ret	4	9	10	7	8	12	8	12	6	13	9	4	5	12	4	4	4	Ret	3	673
7	(New Zealand) John Whelan	8	6	6	8	9	9	9	10	11	10	7	8	Ret	7	4	Ret	6	5	5	8	594
8	(New Zealand) Keeley Pudney	5	7	7	9	11	10	5	Ret	8	Ret	12	11	5	10	8						502
9	(United Kingdom) Will Stevens				3	8	2	10	2	7	5	4	2									491
10	(United Kingdom) William Buller				1	2	12	8	6	1	4	11	4									467
11	(Australia) Nathan Antunes	3	1	5	Ret	6	7	1	11	6										3	5	391
12	(New Zealand) Earl Bamber													1	2	2						209
13	(China) Adderly Fong				Ret	Ret	11	11	9	9												190
14	(New Zealand) Andrew Waite										9	5	Ret	6	11	11						166
15	(New Zealand) Daniel Gaunt													Ret	1	1						150
16	(New Zealand) Ken Smith													DNS	6	7	Ret	7	Ret	8	10	129
17	(New Zealand) John McIntyre										12	8	10									111
18	(New Zealand) Andy Knight										8	10	12									89
	(New Zealand) Richie Stanaway																			1	1	0
	(New Zealand) Daynom Templeman																			4	Ret	0
	(New Zealand) Stefan Webling																			6	7	0
TRS Lites
	(New Zealand) Mitch Evans													9	Ret	9				9	11	0
	(New Zealand) Chris Cox													10	9	10				10	13	0
	(New Zealand) Jamie McNee																			Ret	12	0
Pos.	Driver	R1	R2	R3	R1	R2	R3	R1	R2	R3	R1	R2	R3	R1	R2	R3	R1	R2	R3	R1	R2	Points
Pos.	Driver	RUA			TIM			TER			TAU			MAN			PUK			HAM		Points
