= International Motorsport =

New Zealand motor racing team

- Manufacturer: Ford
- Team Principal: Lyall Williamson
- Team Manager: Nick Williamson
- Race Drivers: 96. Ant Pedersen
- Chassis: Ford FG Falcon
- Debut: 2012
- Round wins: 2
- 5th

International Motorsport is a New Zealand motor racing team based in Grey Lynn, Auckland that competes in the V8SuperTourer series and the South Island Endurance Championship.

== History ==
The team was established in 1960 by Lyall Williamson and has raced in many New Zealand motorsport series as well as racing in Australia on occasion.

New Zealand motorsport legend Denny Hulme worked actively with the team until his death in 1992.

In 2012 the team ran three cars in the V8 SuperTourer Series.

Alongside series regulars Jonny Reid and Ant Pedersen the team entered a third car – the #32 for Mitch Cunningham and Dean Canto from the Taupo round onwards in the 2012 season. But in 2013 the Cunningham's separated from International Motorsport and ran their own team.

Also in 2012, International Motorsport ran in the V8 Challenge Cup. The #96 entry was driven by lead driver Ant's cousin Hayden.

International Motorsport currently run four entries in the New Zealand Toyota 86 Championship. They also run multiple front running GT3 race cars in Both the New Zealand North Island and South Island Endurance Series Championship.
