= Mitch Cunningham =

New Zealand racing driver

- Nationality: New Zealand
- Born: Mitchell John Cunningham; 5 September 1986 (age 40) Auckland (New Zealand)
- Relatives: Wade Cunningham (brother)

V8SuperTourer career
- Debut season: 2012
- Current team: Cunningham Racing
- Car number: 32
- Former teams: International Motorsport
- Starts: 55
- Wins: 2
- Poles: 0
- Fastest laps: 0
- Best finish: 8th in 2014

Previous series
- 2015-16 2012-15 2009-11 2008 2007-09 2007: NZ Touring Cars Championship; V8SuperTourers; New Zealand Porsche GT3 Cup; Indy Lights; Toyota Racing Series; Pacific F2000

Championship titles
- 2008–2009: Toyota Racing Series

Mitchell John Cunningham (born 5 September 1986 in Auckland) is a New Zealand racing driver. He is the younger brother of Indy Lights champion Wade Cunningham.

Cunningham drove in Indy Lights in 2008 on a partial schedule of only road course races. He finished 23rd in points starting eight of the 16 rounds of the championship.

Cunningham next competed in the 2008–2009 Toyota Racing Series championship, winning top honours winning three of the six races.

Cunningham currently races in the New Zealand GT3 Porsche Cup. He is also one of New Zealand's most successful kart racers, having attained notable finishes in Japan and Italy. He has four New Zealand Karting Championships to his name.

== Career summary ==
Season	Series	Team	Races	Wins	Poles	F. Laps	Podiums	Points	Position
2007	Pacific F2000		12	1	2	2	2	178	5th
2007–08	Toyota Racing Series	International Motorsport	23	0	0	0	2	803	6th
2008	Indy Lights	Brian Stewart Racing	8	0	0	0	0	118	23rd
2008–09	Toyota Racing Series	Giles Motorsport	18	5	7	4	13	1110	1st
2009–10	New Zealand Porsche GT3 Cup Challenge	International Motorsport	18	0	0	0	0	771	8th
2010–11	New Zealand Porsche GT3 Cup Challenge	International Motorsport	18	0	0	0	4	824	4th
2012	V8SuperTourers	International Motorsport	7	0	0	0	0	822	25th
2013	V8SuperTourers	Cunningham Racing	21	0	0	0	0	929	27th
2014	V8SuperTourers	Cunningham Racing	12	0	0	0	0	543	8th
2014–15	V8SuperTourers	Cunningham Racing	15	2	0	0	2	938	10th
2015–16	NZ Touring Cars Championship	Cunningham Racing	20	0	0	0	7	1067	3rd

== Indy Lights ==
Year	Team	1	2	3	4	5	6	7	8	9	10	11	12	13	14	15	16	Rank	Points	Ref
2008	Brian Stewart Racing	HMS	STP1; 19	STP2; 18	KAN	INDY	MIL	IOW	WGL1; 12	WGL2; 12	NSH	MOH1; 15	MOH2; 12	KTY	SNM1; 11	SNM2; 23	CHI	23rd	118	

Sporting positions
Preceded by Andy Knight	Toyota Racing Series; Champion; 2008–09	Succeeded by Mitch Evans
