= Formula Regional Oceania Trophy =

Single-Seater Racing Championship

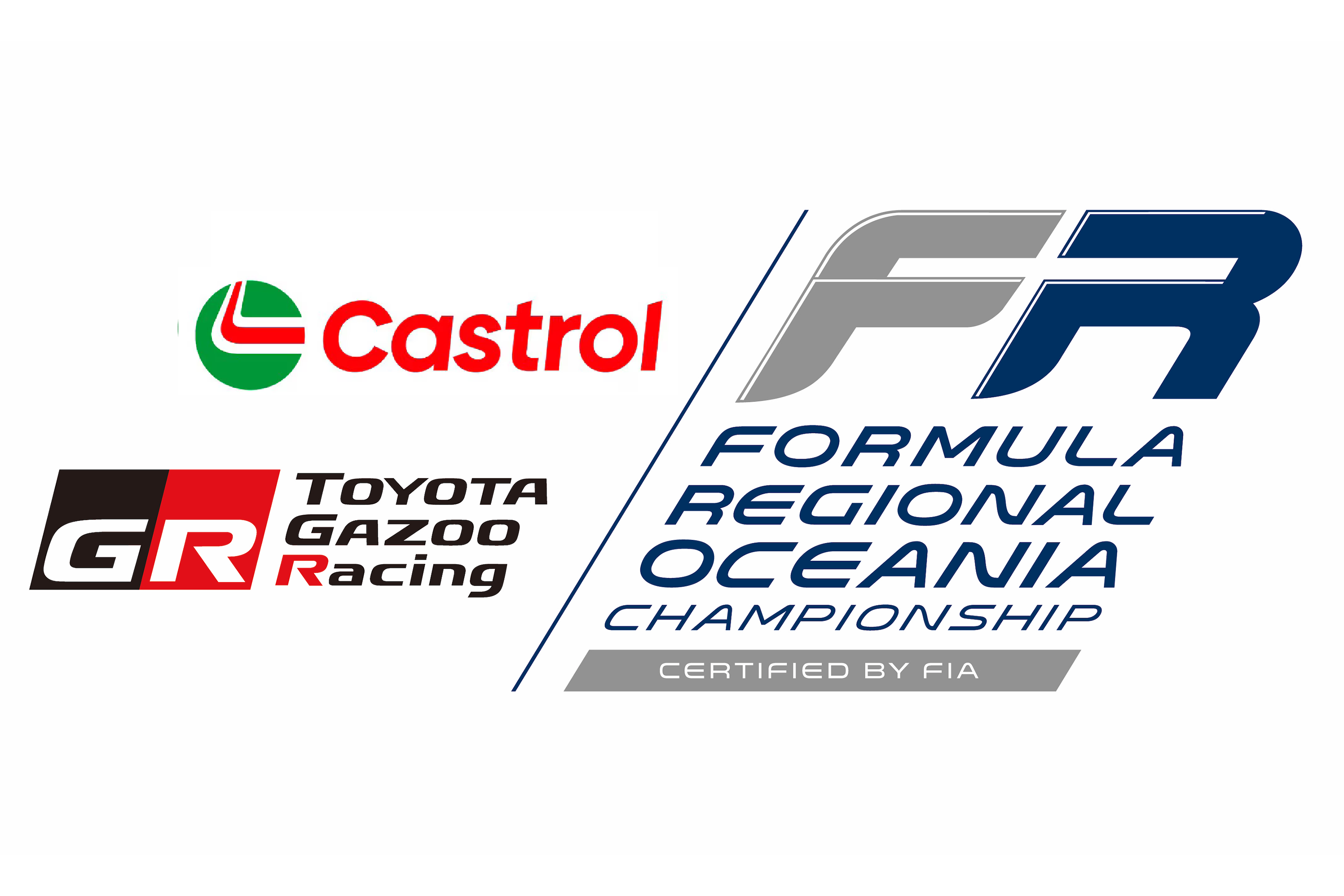
- Category: Open-wheeler racing
- Country: Oceania
- Inaugural season: 2005
- Drivers: 20 (2026)
- Teams: 6 (2026)
- Constructors: Tatuus
- Engine suppliers: Toyota
- Tyre suppliers: Pirelli
- Drivers' champion: (United States) Ugo Ugochukwu
- Teams' champion: (New Zealand) M2 Competition
- Official website: www.toyota.co.nz/toyota-racing/castrol-toyota-fr-oceania/

The Formula Regional Oceania Trophy is New Zealand's premier formula racing category, sanctioned by Motorsport New Zealand, the sport's governing body in the country. The series includes races for every major trophy in New Zealand circuit racing including the New Zealand Motor Cup and the Denny Hulme Memorial Trophy. The cars are also the category for the New Zealand Grand Prix – one of only two races in the world with FIA approval to use the Grand Prix nomenclature outside Formula One. The series was known as the Toyota Racing Series until 2023.

It is an incubator and showcase for New Zealand racing drivers, offering upcoming talents the chance to gain experience with carbon-fibre composite chassis, aerodynamics and slick tyres.

== History ==
Toyota Racing Management
- Founded: 2004
- Headquarters: Hampton Downs, Auckland, New Zealand
- Area served: New Zealand
- Key people: Nico Caillol; Sarah Brown

Previously, the country's leading drivers had to go offshore to step up to this level. High-profile graduates from the series to date include Brendon Hartley, formerly in Formula One with Scuderia Toro Rosso Honda, and Earl Bamber. The series has also seen the likes of Liam Lawson, Daniil Kvyat, Will Stevens, Lance Stroll and Lando Norris compete on their way to Formula One.

For 2008, the series has also gone "green". Fuels for all cars racing in the series are now an E85 biofuel blend of 85 per cent ethanol made from whey, a dairy industry by-product; and petrol. Reduced emissions, reduced carbon "footprint" and reduced use of fossil fuels are all being showcased in this unique New Zealand programme. The 2008 New Zealand Grand Prix thus becomes the first ever biofuel grand prix in the world.

The former logo of the Toyota Racing Series, used until 2022.

The short summer series (five weekends in five weeks, all in January and February) during the Southern Hemisphere summer has made the series attractive to development drivers from the Northern Hemisphere, as the series takes place during the off-season, serving as single-seater motorsport's equivalent of professional baseball's "winter ball" leagues in the Caribbean and Australia. Drivers from both Europe and the Americas actively participate in the series, as it allows them to develop their skills in an atmosphere similar to the winter ball leagues. A June 2019 FIA World Motor Sport Council decision now allows development drivers to tally Toyota Racing Series with their regular series towards FIA Super Licence points required to be in a Formula One car, meaning the driver can participate in this series, then participate in a series that starts after the end of the Toyota Racing Series, and accumulate points from both series towards F1 approval.

Until the beginning of 2017, the series was managed by Toyota Racing Management, a company under the leadership of Barrie Thomlinson.

The series was renamed to Castrol Toyota Formula Regional Oceania Championship for the 2023 season, joining the other various Formula Regional series around the world.

In 2025 Lando Norris became the first Formula One World Champion that had competed in the Formula Regional Oceania Championship.

== Circuits ==
The current championship consists of four rounds, each comprising three races.

- **Bold** denotes a circuit is used in the 2026 season.

Number	Circuits	Rounds	Years
1	(New Zealand) Manfeild: Circuit Chris Amon	22 (Note: Manfeild Circuit hosted 2 rounds in 2005, 2007–08 season.) (Note: Manfeild Circuit hosted New Zealand Grand Prix from 2008 to 2020.)	2005–2021, 2023–2025
2	(New Zealand) **Teretonga Park**	18 (Note: Teretonga Park hosted New Zealand Grand Prix from 2005 to 2007.)	2005–2020, 2023, 2025–present
3	(New Zealand) **Bruce McLaren Motorsport Park**	16	2006–2013, 2015–2019, 2023–present
3	(New Zealand) **Hampton Downs Motorsport Park**	16 (Note: Hampton Downs Motorsport Park hosted 2 rounds in 2021 season.) (Note: Hampton Downs Motorsport Park hosted New Zealand Grand Prix in 2021 and 2023.)	2010–2021, 2023–present
5	(New Zealand) Euromarque Motorsport Park	11 (Note: Euromarque Motorsport Park hosted 2 rounds in 2005–06 season.)	2005–2006, 2008, 2015–2018, 2024
6	(New Zealand) Timaru International Motor Raceway	10	2005–2014
7	(New Zealand) Pukekohe Park Raceway	8 (Note: Pukekohe Park Raceway hosted 2 rounds in 2005–06, 2006–07 season.)	2005–2007, 2009, 2020
8	(New Zealand) **Highlands Motorsport Park**	6 (Note: Highlands Motorsport Park hosted New Zealand Grand Prix in 2024–2025, and it will host New Zealand Grand Prix also in 2026.)	2014, 2019–2020, 2023–present
9	(New Zealand) Hamilton Street Circuit	2 (Note: Hamilton Street Circuit hosted non-championship rounds in 2008 and 2009.)	2008–2009

== Car ==
Toyota Racing Series Car Engine

=== 2015–2019 ===
The Toyota Racing Series ran a Tatuus FT-50 chassis with modified versions of 1.8L Toyota four cylinder 2ZZ-GE production engines which can produce 200bhp, a six speed Sadev sequential transmission with limited slip differential with a carbon fibre body and a Carbon monocoque chassis built by Tatuus in Italy to full FIA F3 specification. The cars use Michelin S308 tyres (Front 20x54x13, Rear 24x57x13) and weigh approximately 480 kg.

=== 2020–2026 ===
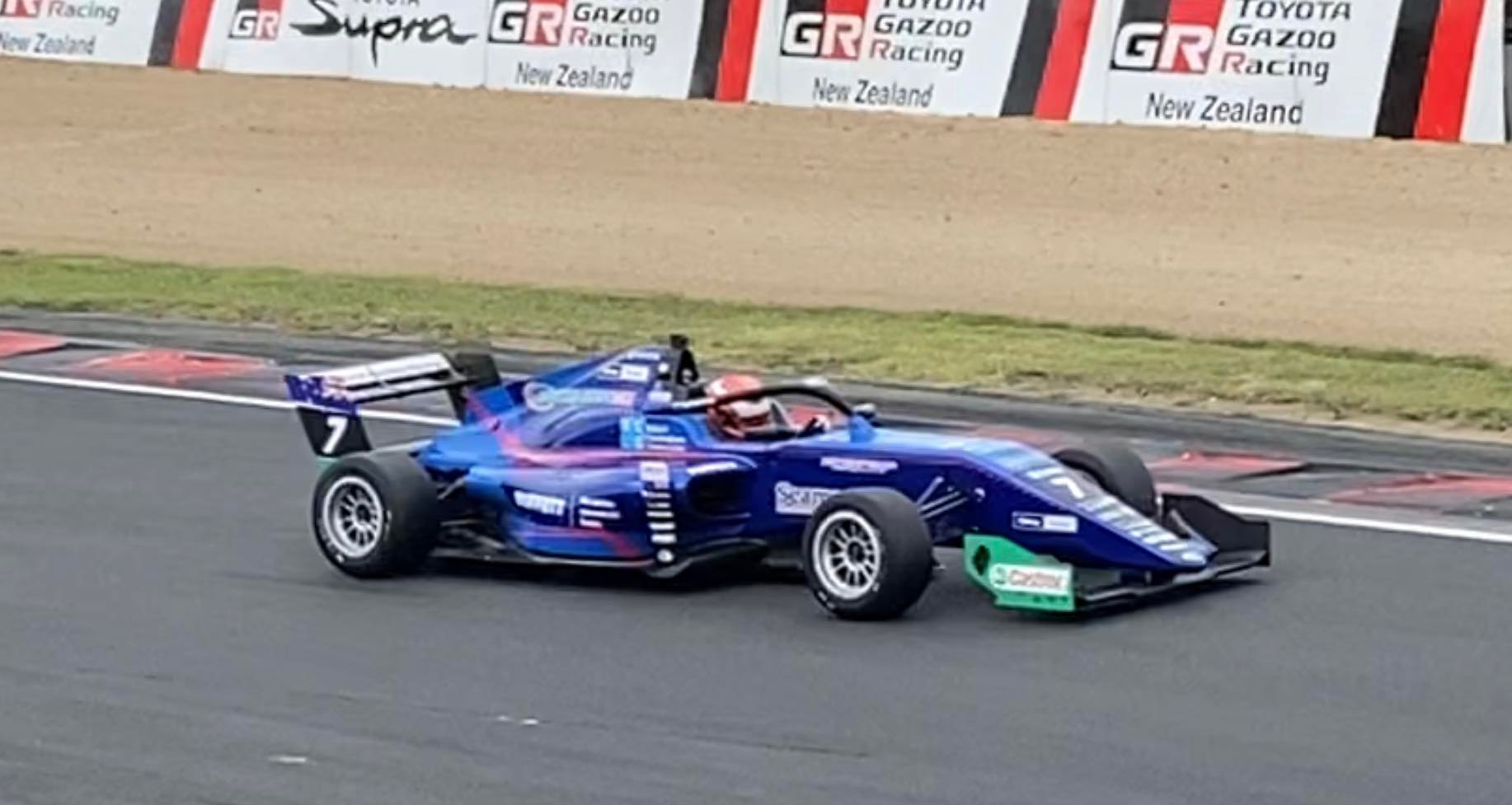
Tatuus FT-60 in 2021 New Zealand Grand Prix

The Toyota Racing Series switched to a new chassis called Tatuus FT-60, identical to the Tatuus F.3 T-318 used in Europe, whereas the new engine 8AR-FTS will be a 2.0L turbocharged unit developing 270bhp. The cars have a halo for the protection of the drivers head and the car weighs approximately 665 kg with driver.

=== 2027–present ===
The series will switch to the new Tatuus GRF-70, which is to be based on the Tatuus F3 T-326 Gen2 chassis used in the european & middle eastern series. The engine will be identical to the previous generation of car.

== Champions ==
Season	Driver	Team	Poles	Wins	Podiums	Fastest laps	Points	Clinched	Margin
2005	(New Zealand) Brent Collins	Brent Collins Motorsport	1	4	10	4	937	Race 18 of 18	33
2005–06	(New Zealand) Daniel Gaunt	International Motorsport	5	7	17	10	1491	Race 21 of 23	479
2006–07	(New Zealand) Daniel Gaunt	International Motorsport	3	9	16	8	1448	Race 21 of 23	328
2007–08	(New Zealand) Andy Knight	Knight Motorsport	6	6	16	2	1230	Race 23 of 23	33
2008–09	(New Zealand) Mitch Cunningham	Giles Motorsport	7	5	13	4	1110	Race 17 of 18	121
2010	(New Zealand) Mitch Evans	Giles Motorsport	8	3	10	5	915	Race 15 of 15	3
2011	(New Zealand) Mitch Evans	Giles Motorsport	6	7	14	5	973	Race 13 of 15	168
2012	(New Zealand) Nick Cassidy	Giles Motorsport	0	5	10	4	934	Race 13 of 15	176
2013	(New Zealand) Nick Cassidy	M2 Competition	0	2	10	6	915	Race 14 of 15	112
2014	(Singapore) Andrew Tang	Neale Motorsport	1	3	9	4	794	Race 15 of 15	4
2015	(Canada) Lance Stroll	M2 Competition	0	4	10	2	906	Race 14 of 16	108
2016	(United Kingdom) Lando Norris	M2 Competition	8	6	11	5	924	Race 14 of 15	135
2017	(Australia) Thomas Randle	Victory Motor Racing	3	2	7	7	855	Race 15 of 15	5
2018	(Russia) Robert Shwartzman	M2 Competition	3	1	9	3	916	Race 15 of 15	5
2019	(New Zealand) Liam Lawson	M2 Competition	4	5	11	5	356	Race 15 of 15	10
2020	(Brazil) Igor Fraga	M2 Competition	3	4	9	3	362	Race 15 of 15	6
2021	(New Zealand) Matthew Payne	M2 Competition	6	5	9	5	287	Race 8 of 9	58
2022	Season cancelled due to COVID-19 pandemic								
2023	(Austria) Charlie Wurz	M2 Competition	4	4	6	1	343	Race 15 of 15	14
2024	(Poland) Roman Bilinski	M2 Competition	5	6	12	5	385	Race 14 of 15	43
2025	(United Kingdom) Arvid Lindblad	M2 Competition	6	6	12	6	370	Race 13 of 15	56
2026	(United States) Ugo Ugochukwu	M2 Competition	2	4	8	4	325	Race 15 of 15	15

== Drivers ==
Most titles

Titles	Driver	Years
2	(New Zealand) Daniel Gaunt	2005–06, 2006–07
2	(New Zealand) Mitch Evans	2010, 2011
2	(New Zealand) Nick Cassidy	2012, 2013

By country

Wins	Country	Drivers	Years
11	New Zealand	Brent Collins	2005
11	New Zealand	Daniel Gaunt	2005–06, 2006–07
11	New Zealand	Andy Knight	2007–08
11	New Zealand	Mitch Cunningham	2008–09
11	New Zealand	Mitch Evans	2010, 2011
11	New Zealand	Nick Cassidy	2012, 2013
11	New Zealand	Liam Lawson	2019
11	New Zealand	Matthew Payne	2021
2	United Kingdom	Lando Norris	2016
2	United Kingdom	Arvid Lindblad	2025
1	Singapore	Andrew Tang	2014
1	Canada	Lance Stroll	2015
1	Australia	Thomas Randle	2017
1	Russia	Robert Shwartzman	2018
1	Brazil	Igor Fraga	2020
1	Austria	Charlie Wurz	2023
1	Poland	Roman Bilinski	2024
1	United States	Ugo Ugochukwu	2026

== Teams ==
Most titles

Titles	Team	Years
11	M2 Competition	2013, 2015, 2016, 2018, 2019, 2020, 2021, 2023, 2024, 2025, 2026
4	Giles Motorsport	2008–09, 2010, 2011, 2012
2	International Motorsport	2005–06, 2006–07
1	Brent Collins Motorsport	2005
1	Knight Motorsport	2007–08
1	Neale Motorsport	2014
1	Victory Motor Racing	2017

== Trophies ==
The winner of the feature race of each round in the championship is awarded a trophy:

1. Lady Wigram Trophy
2. The Spirit of the Nation Cup
3. The NZ Motor Cup
4. Denny Hulme Memorial Trophy
5. Dan Higgins Trophy
6. The New Zealand Grand Prix Trophy

The overall winner of the championship (based on championship points) receives the Chris Amon Trophy
