= Matt Payne =

New Zealand racing driver (born 2002)

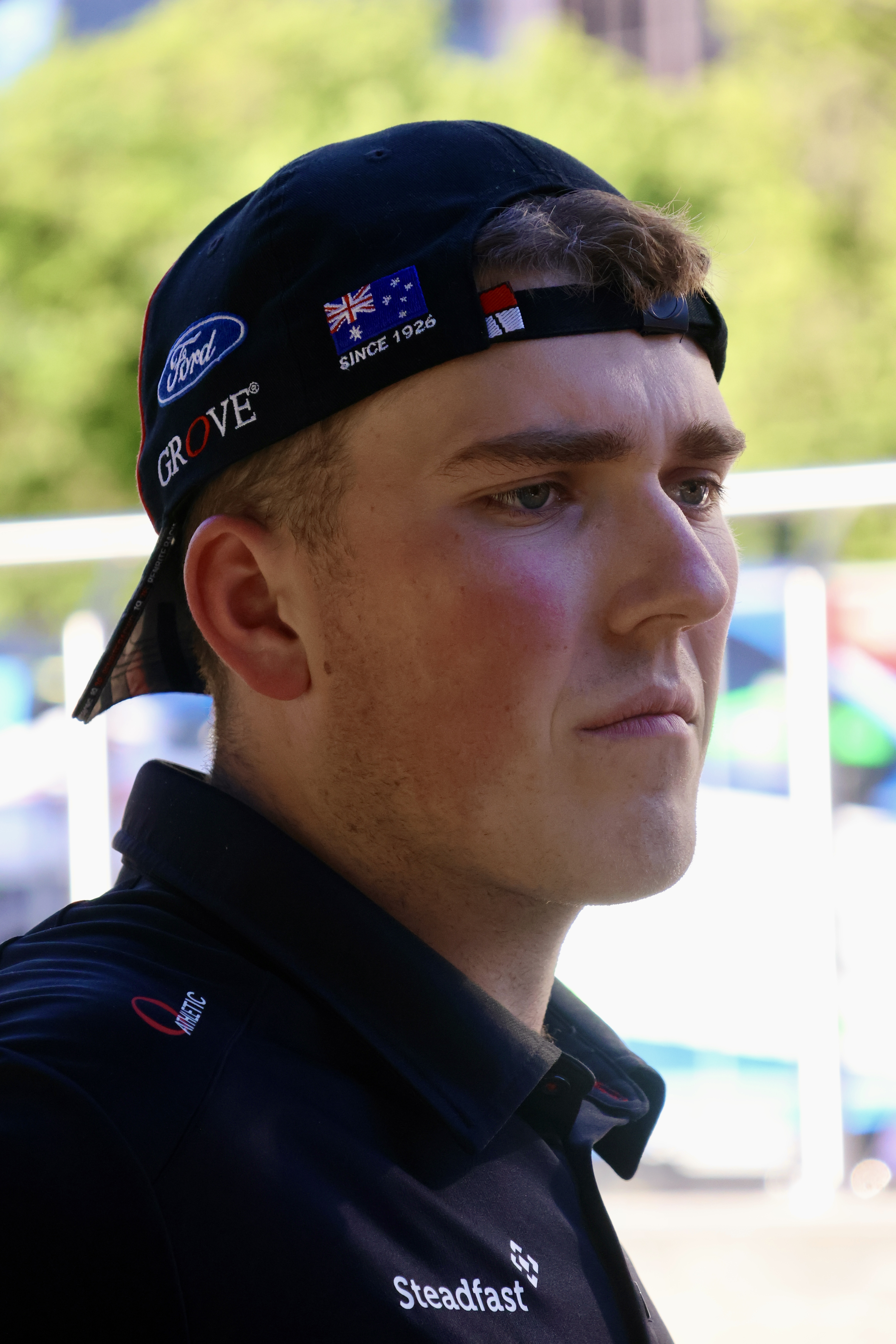
- Matt Payne at the Adelaide Street Circuit in 2025
- Nationality: New Zealander
- Born: Matthew Allen Payne; 3 October 2002 (age 24) Auckland, New Zealand

Supercars Championship career
- Debut season: 2022
- Current team: Grove Racing
- Categorisation: FIA Silver (until 2023); FIA Gold (2024–)
- Car number: 19
- Starts: 115
- Wins: 12
- Podiums: 32
- Poles: 10
- Best finish: 5th in 2025

Previous series
- 2021 2021: Toyota Racing Series; Porsche Carrera Cup Australia

Championship titles
- 2021: Toyota Racing Series

Matthew Allen Payne (born 3 October 2002) is a New Zealand racing driver from Auckland, New Zealand. He is currently competing in the Supercars Championship with Grove Racing, driving the No. 19 Ford Mustang GT. He won the 2025 Bathurst 1000 with Garth Tander. He went to the same school in Waiau Pa with F1 driver Liam Lawson.

== Racing career ==
=== Toyota Racing Series ===
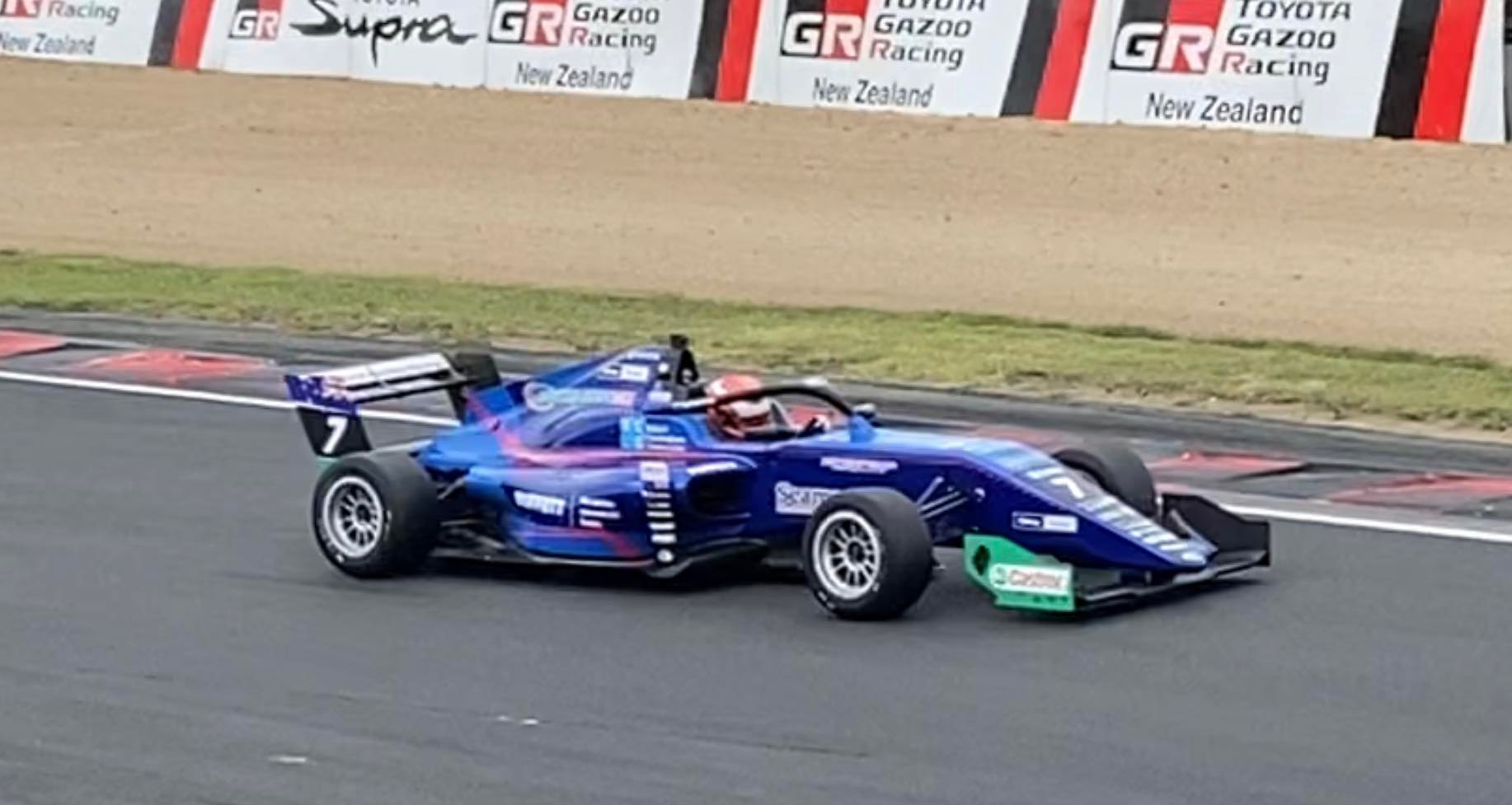
Payne during the 2021 NZGP at Hampton Downs Motorsport Park

After turning heads with his karting success, Payne tested the FT-50 (older spec TRS) and impressed immediately with confirmation coming in December 2020 that Payne would contest the full three round 2021 Toyota Racing Series for M2 Motorsport.

The 2021 New Zealand Grand Prix was the opening round of the season and was held at Hampton Downs Motorsport Park, due to the COVID-19 pandemic the series lacked international drivers. To compensate the event organizers called on experienced New Zealand racing drivers such as Shane van Gisbergen, Greg Murphy & Andre Heimgartner to heighten the quantity and quality of the field. Payne impressed in his open-wheel debut finishing third in all three races over the weekend including the NZGP. Payne went on to win five of the remaining six races, winning the 2021 Toyota Racing Series conformably over second placed Kaleb Ngatoa.

=== Supercars career ===
Payne would debut in the Australian Supercars Championship in 2022 for Grove Racing, his debut race was the Bathurst 1000 co-driving with Lee Holdsworth where they finished the race in sixth place.

2025 was the breakout year for Payne, finishing fifth in the championship, but also winning five wins and prestigious trophies including the Jason Richards Memorial Trophy for accumulating the most point during the New Zealand round, winning Race 13 in Tasmania over by Broc Feeney by 0.0550 seconds, the third closest finish in Supercars, Bathurst 1000 & Enduro Cup along with Garth Tander and capping off with the Adelaide 500 at the end of the season.

== Racing record ==
=== Karting career summary ===
Season	Series	Position
2010	New Zealand Top Half Series - Cadet	14th
2011	New Zealand Schools Nationals - Cadet	9th
2011	43rd Blossom Festival - Cadet	5th
2012	New Zealand Top Half Series - Cadet	13th
2012	New Zealand Sprint Championship - Cadet	**1st**
2012	New Zealand Schools Nationals - Cadet	**1st**
2012	North Island Sprint Championship - 100cc Junior Restricted	**3rd**
2012	Auckland City of Sails - Cadet Raket	**1st**
2012	CIK Trophy of New Zealand - Cadet	18th
2012	Auckland Regional Schools Championship - Cadet	**1st**
2013	New Zealand Top Half Series - Yamaha Junior	11th
2013	New Zealand Sprint Championship - 100cc Junior Restricted	4th
2013	North Island Sprint Championship - 100cc Junior Restricted	5th
2013	Auckland City of Sails - 100cc Junior Restricted	**2nd**
2013	North Island Sprint Championship - Rotax Junior	6th
2013	Auckland City of Sails - 100cc Junior Restricted	**2nd**
2013	New Zealand Sprint Championship - 100cc Junior Restricted	**2nd**
2014	New Zealand Sprint Championship - Rotax Junior	6th
2016	RMC New Zealand - Junior Max	**1st**
2018	New Zealand Pro Kart Series - KZ2	4th
2018	North Island Sprint Championship - Rotax Light	**2nd**
2018	New Zealand Sprint Championship - Rotax Light	8th
2018	Auckland City of Sails - KZ2	**2nd**
2019	CIK Trophy of New Zealand - KZ2	11th
2019	New Zealand Sprint Championship - KZ2	**1st**
2019	FIA Karting International Super Cup - KZ2	34th
2019	Race of Stars - KZ2	**3rd**
2019	Australian Karting Championship - KZ2	10th
2020	WSK Super Masters Series - KZ2	42nd
2020	25th South Gardia Winter Cup - KZ2	12th

=== Circuit racing summary ===
Season	Series	Team	Races	Wins	Poles	F/laps	Podiums	Points	Position
2021	Toyota Racing Series	M2 Competition	9	5	3	5	9	287	**1st**
2021	Porsche Carrera Cup Australia	Earl Bamber Motorsport	13	1	2	0	3	362	6th
2021	Super2 Series	Grove Racing	3	0	0	0	0	234	17th
2022	Super2 Series	Grove Racing	11	2	3	0	6	1209	**3rd**
2022	Supercars Championship	Grove Racing	1	0	0	0	0	204	34th
2022	24H GT Series - GT3	Earl Bamber Motorsport	1	0	0	0	0	5	24th
2022	European Le Mans Series - GTE	JMW Motorsport	5	0	0	0	0	33	15th
2022	GT World Challenge Europe Endurance Cup	Singha Racing Team TP 12	1	0	0	0	0	0	NC
2022	GT World Challenge Europe Endurance Cup	EBM Grove Racing	1	0	0	0	0	0	NC
2023	Supercars Championship	Grove Racing	28	1	0	0	1	1487	14th
2023-24	Middle East Trophy - GT3	EBM – Grove Racing	1	0	0	0	0	0	NC
2024	Supercars Championship	Grove Racing	24	1	2	2	4	2019	6th
2024	24H Series - GT3	Grove Racing	2	0	0	0	0	0	NC
2025	Supercars Championship	Grove Racing	34	5	1	1	10	4461	5th

* Season still in progress

=== Complete Toyota Racing Series results ===
(key) (Races in bold indicate pole position) (Races in italics indicate fastest lap)

Year	Team	1	2	3	4	5	6	7	8	9	DC	Points
2021	M2 Competition	HD1; 1; 3	HD1; 2; 3	HD1; 3; 3	**HD2**; **1**; 1	**HD2**; **2**; 1	**MAN**; **1**; 1	**MAN**; **2**; 1	**MAN**; **3**; 2	**MAN**; **4**; 1	1st	356

=== Complete New Zealand Grand Prix results ===
Year	Team	Car	Qualifying	Main race
2021	(New Zealand) M2 Competition	Tatuus FT-60 - Toyota	4th	**3rd**

=== Complete Australian Carrera Cup Championship results ===
(key) (Races in bold indicate pole position – 1 point awarded all races) (Races in italics indicate fastest lap) (* signifies that driver lead feature race for at least one lap – 1 point awarded)

Year	Team	Car	1	2	3	4	5	6	7	8	9	10	11	12	13	Pos	Pts
2021	Earl Bamber Motorsport	Porsche 911 GT3 Cup Type 991.II	SAN; R1; 12	SAN; R2; 10	SAN; R3; 16	**BEN**; **R4**; **Ret**	BEN; R5; 5	BEN; R6; 3	**TOW**; **R7**; **10**	TOW; R8; 3	TOW; R9; 1	BAT; R10; 15	BAT; R11; 9	BAT; R12; 5	BAT; R13; 4	6th	362

=== Super2 Series results ===
(key) (Race results only)

Super2 Series results
Year	Team	No.	Car	1	2	3	4	5	6	7	8	9	10	11	12	Position	Points
2021	Grove Racing	10	Nissan Altima L33	BAT; R1	BAT; R2	TOW1; R3	TOW1; R4	TOW2; R5	TOW2; R6	SMP; R7; 16	SMP; R8; C	BAT; R9; 13	BAT; R10; 5			17th	234
2022	Grove Racing	10	Nissan Altima L33	**SMP**; **R1**; **4**	SMP; R2; 2	**BAR**; **R3**; **1**	**BAR**; **R4**; **2**	TOW; R5; 10	TOW; R6; Ret	SAN; R7; 19	SAN; R8; 1	BAT; R9; 3	BAT; R10; C	ADE; R11; 2	ADE; R12; 4	3rd	1209

=== Supercars Championship results ===
Supercars results
Year	Team	No.	Car	1	2	3	4	5	6	7	8	9	10	11	12	13	14	15	16	17	18	19	20	21	22	23	24	25	26	27	28	29	30	31	32	33	34	35	36	37	Position	Points
2021	Kelly Grove Racing	10	Ford Mustang S550	BAT1; R1	BAT1; R2	SAN; R3	SAN; R4	SAN; R5	SYM; R6	SYM; R7	SYM; R8	BEN; R9	BEN; R10	BEN; R11	HID; R12	HID; R13	HID; R14	TOW1; R15	TOW1; R16	TOW2; R17	TOW2; R18	TOW2; R19	SMP1; R20	SMP1; R21	SMP1; R22	SMP2; R23	SMP2; R24	SMP2; R25	SMP3; R26	SMP3; R27	SMP3; R28	SMP4; R29; PO	SMP4; R30; PO	BAT2; R31							NC	0
2022	Grove Racing	10	Ford Mustang S550	SMP; R1	SMP; R2	SYM; R3	SYM; R4	SYM; R5	MEL; R6	MEL; R7	MEL; R8	MEL; R9	BAR; R10	BAR; R11	BAR; R12	WIN; R13	WIN; R14	WIN; R15	HID; R16	HID; R17	HID; R18	TOW; R19	TOW; R20	BEN; R21	BEN; R22	BEN; R23	SAN; R24; PO	SAN; R25; PO	SAN; R26	PUK; R27	PUK; R28	PUK; R29	BAT; R30; 6	SUR; R31	SUR; R32	ADE; R33	ADE; R34				34th	204
2023	Grove Racing	19	Ford Mustang S650	NEW; R1; 12	NEW; R2; 14	MEL; R3; 13	MEL; R4; 17	MEL; R5; 21	MEL; R6; 12	BAR; R7; 6	BAR; R8; 9	BAR; R9; 18	SYM; R10; 15	SYM; R11; 15	SYM; R12; 21	HID; R13; 19	HID; R14; 23	HID; R15; 25	TOW; R16; 15	TOW; R17; 18	SMP; R18; 24	SMP; R19; 23	BEN; R20; 7	BEN; R21; 6	BEN; R22; 18	SAN; R23; 6	BAT; R24; 11	SUR; R25; 9	SUR; R26; 4	ADE; R27; 23	ADE; R28; 1										14th	1673
2024	Grove Racing	19	Ford Mustang S650	BAT1; R1; 10	BAT1; R2; 7	MEL; R3; 3	MEL; R4; 3	**MEL**; **R5**; **Ret**	MEL; R6; 14	TAU; R7; 13	**TAU**; **R8**; **4**	BAR; R9; 8	BAR; R10; 9	HID; R11; 15	HID; R12; 20	TOW; R13; 4	TOW; R14; 1	SMP; R15; 2	SMP; R16; 4	SYM; R17; 17	SYM; R18; 21	SAN; R19; 4	BAT; R20; Ret	SUR; R21; 4	SUR; R22; 9	ADE; R23; 4	ADE; R24; 23														6th	2019
2025	Grove Racing	19	Ford Mustang S650	SYD; R1; 4	SYD; R2; 5	SYD; R3; 6	MEL; R4; 9	MEL; R5; 11	MEL; R6; 10	MEL; R7; C	**TAU**; **R8**; **1**	TAU; R9; 4	TAU; R10; 1	SYM; R11; 15	SYM; R12; 7	SYM; R13; 1	BAR; R14; 6	BAR; R15; 5	BAR; R16; 2	HID; R17; 3	HID; R18; 8	HID; R19; 3	TOW; R20; 4	TOW; R21; 3	TOW; R22; 5	QLD; R23; 12	QLD; R24; 6	QLD; R25; 4	BEN; R26; 3	BAT; R27; 1	SUR; R28; 10	SUR; R29; 4	SAN; R30; 6	SAN; R31; 22	ADE; R32; 6	ADE; R33; 6	ADE; R34; 1				5th	4461
2026	Grove Racing	19	Ford Mustang S650	SMP; R1; 4	SMP; R2; 3	SMP; R3; 2	MEL; R4; 2	**MEL**; **R5**; **2**	MEL; R6; Ret	MEL; R7; 20	TAU; R8; 5	TAU; R9; 5	**CHR**; **R10**; **4**	CHR; R11; 19	CHR; R12; 1	**CHR**; **R13**; **1**	SYM; R14; 8	SYM; R15; 3	SYM; R16; 2	HID; R17; 3	HID; R18; 4	HID; R19; 2	TOW; R20; 3	TOW; R21; 1	TOW; R22; 2	**BAR**; **R23**; 1	**BAR**; **R24**; 2	BAR; R25; 1	**QLD**; **R26**; 2	**QLD**; **R27**; 6	QLD; R28; Ret	BEN; R29; 6	BAT; R30; 5	SUR; R31; 3	SUR; R32; 6	**SAN**; **R33**; 2	**SAN**; **R34**; 1	ADE; R35	ADE; R36	ADE; R37	1st*	5150*

=== Bathurst 1000 results ===
Year	Team	Car	Co-driver	Position	Laps
2022	Grove Racing	Ford Mustang S550	(Australia) Lee Holdsworth	6th	161
2023	Grove Racing	Ford Mustang S650	(France) Kévin Estre	11th	161
2024	Grove Racing	Ford Mustang S650	(Australia) Garth Tander	DNF	130
2025	Grove Racing	Ford Mustang S650	(Australia) Garth Tander	**1st**	161
2026	Grove Racing	Ford Mustang S650	(Australia) Will Davison	5th	161

=== The Bend 500 Results ===
Year	Team	Car	Co-driver	Position	Laps
2025	Grove Racing	Ford Mustang S650	(Australia) Garth Tander	**3rd**	102
2026	Grove Racing	Ford Mustang S650	(Australia) Will Davison		

=== Complete European Le Mans Series results ===
(key) (Races in bold indicate pole position) (Races in italics indicate fastest lap)

Year	Entrant	Class	Chassis	1	2	3	4	5	6	Rank	Points
2022	JMW Motorsport	LMGTE	Ferrari 488 GTE Evo	LEC; 10	IMO; 4	MNZ; 6	CAT	SPA; 6	POR; 7	15th	33

Sporting positions
Preceded by Igor Fraga	Toyota Racing Series; Winner; 2021	Succeeded by Charlie Wurz (FR Oceania)
Awards and achievements
Preceded by Anton De Pasquale	Jason Richards Memorial Trophy; 2025	Succeeded by Broc Feeney
