= 2023 New Zealand Grand Prix =

- Race 3, Round 4 of 5 of the 2023 Formula Regional Oceania Championship
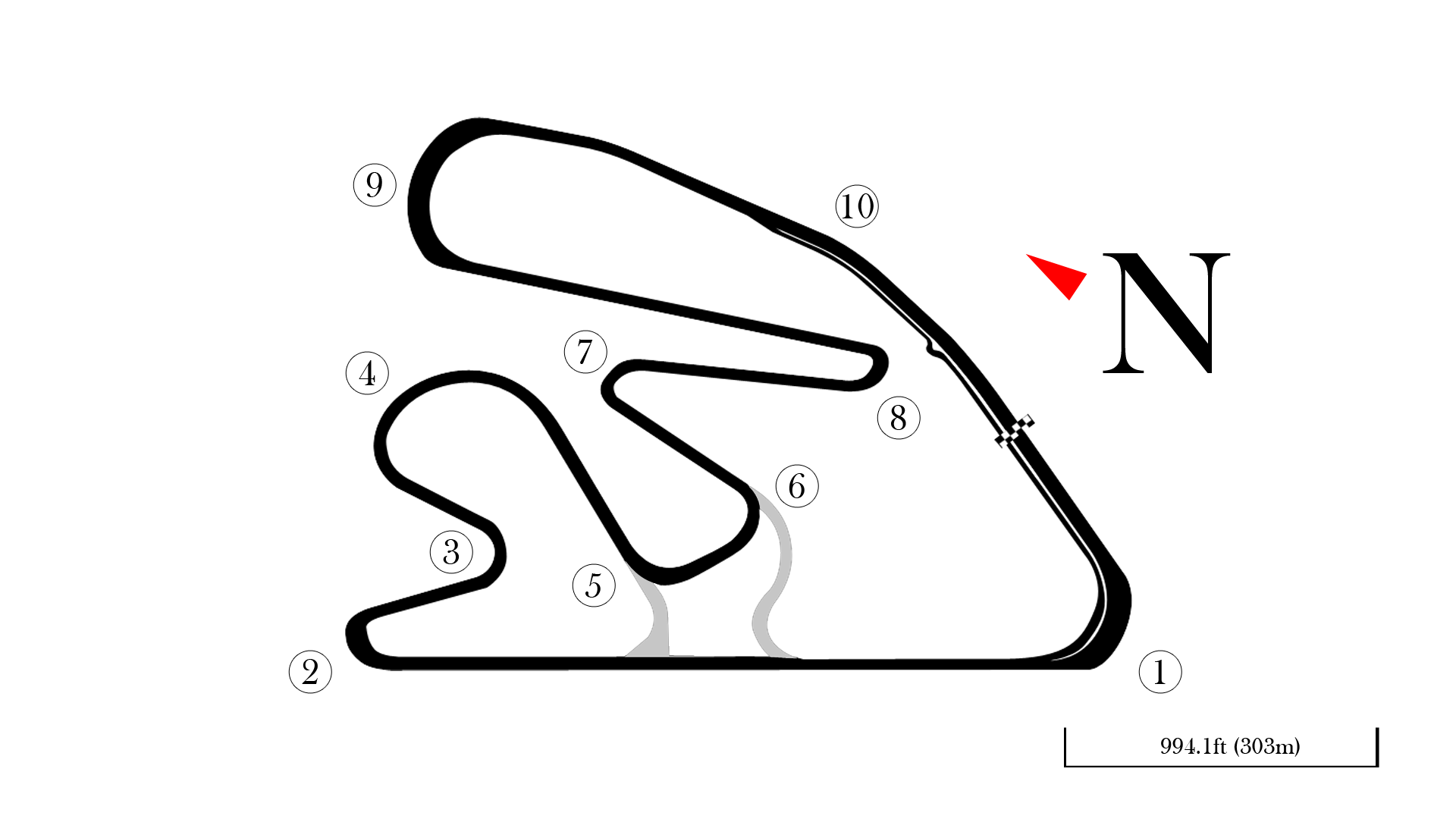

Race details
- Date: 5 February 2023
- Official name: LXVII New Zealand Grand Prix
- Location: Hampton Downs Motorsport Park, Waikato, New Zealand
- Course: Permanent racing facility
- Course length: 3.800 km (2.361 miles)
- Distance: 28 laps, 106.4 km (66.1 miles)
- Weather: Friday: Rain; Saturday: Sunny; Sunday: Sunny

Pole position
Driver	(Netherlands) Laurens van Hoepen	M2 Competition
- Time: 1:29.877

Fastest lap
Driver	(Netherlands) Laurens van Hoepen	M2 Competition
- Time: 1:30.061 on lap 10

Podium
First	(Netherlands) Laurens van Hoepen	M2 Competition
Second	(United Kingdom) Louis Foster	Giles Motorsport
Third	(New Zealand) Callum Hedge	M2 Competition

The 2023 New Zealand Grand Prix event for open wheel racing cars was held at Hampton Downs Motorsport Park in northern Waikato on 5 February 2023. It was the sixty-seventh New Zealand Grand Prix and utilised Formula Regional cars. The event also served as the third race of the fourth round of the 2023 Formula Regional Oceania Championship. This marked the Grand Prix's return after the 2022 iteration was cancelled due to the COVID-19 pandemic, and was the first to feature international drivers since 2020.

Dutch driver Laurens van Hoepen produced a victory in his debut weekend in the Formula Regional Oceania Championship. He won from the highly-fancied Louis Foster, with series leader Callum Hedge rounding out the podium.

== Entry list ==
All drivers compete with identical Tatuus FT-60 chassis cars powered by 2.0L turbocharged Toyota engines. After the 2021 Grand Prix was run without any officially recognized teams, the event returned to a team-based format.

Team	No.	Driver
Hamilton Motorsport Ltd.	4	(New Zealand) Billy Frazer
Hamilton Motorsport Ltd.	84	(New Zealand) Chris van der Drift
Kiwi Motorsport	5	(Brazil) Lucas Fecury
Kiwi Motorsport	8	(Australia) Tom McLennan
Kiwi Motorsport	21	(United Kingdom) Josh Mason
Kiwi Motorsport	51	(United States) Jacob Abel
Kiwi Motorsport	86	(New Zealand) Brendon Leitch
Kiwi Motorsport	98	(New Zealand) James Penrose
M2 Competition	7	(Austria) Charlie Wurz
M2 Competition	17	(New Zealand) Callum Hedge
M2 Competition	18	(Netherlands) Laurens van Hoepen
M2 Competition	23	(New Zealand) Liam Sceats
M2 Competition	77	(United States) David Morales
M2 Competition	101	(Australia) Ryder Quinn
Giles Motorsport	15	(New Zealand) Kaleb Ngatoa
Giles Motorsport	26	(United Kingdom) Louis Foster
Giles Motorsport	36	(Republic of Ireland) Adam Fitzgerald
Giles Motorsport	55	(New Zealand) Breanna Morris
Giles Motorsport	66	(United States) Ryan Shehan
Giles Motorsport	88	(United States) Chloe Chambers

== Qualifying ==
=== Qualifying classification ===
Pos.	No.	Driver	Team	Qualifying times			Final grid
Pos.	No.	Driver	Team	Q1	Q2	Q3	Final grid
1	18	(Netherlands) Laurens van Hoepen	M2 Competition	1:30.240	1:30.389	1:29.819	1
2	26	(United Kingdom) Louis Foster	Giles Motorsport	1:30.474	1:30.465	1:29.863	2
3	15	(New Zealand) Kaleb Ngatoa	Giles Motorsport	1:30.340	1:30.461	1:29.978	3
4	17	(New Zealand) Callum Hedge	M2 Competition	1:30.401	1:30.540	1:30.003	4
5	7	(Austria) Charlie Wurz	M2 Competition	1:30.552	1:30.449	1:30.097	5
6	23	(New Zealand) Liam Sceats	M2 Competition	1:30.545	1:30.631	1:30.133	6
7	51	(United States) Jacob Abel	Kiwi Motorsport	1:30.785	1:30.667	1:30.313	7
8	77	(United States) David Morales	M2 Competition	1:30.685	1:30.620	1:30.362	8
9	84	(New Zealand) Chris van der Drift	Hamilton Motorsport	1:30.738	1:30.684	N/A	9
10	21	(United Kingdom) Josh Mason	Kiwi Motorsport	1:30.903	1:30.693	N/A	10
11	66	(United States) Ryan Shehan	Giles Motorsport	1:30.894	1:30.698	N/A	11
12	36	(Republic of Ireland) Adam Fitzgerald	Giles Motorsport	1:30.523	1:30.821	N/A	12
13	86	(New Zealand) Brendon Leitch	Kiwi Motorsport	1:30.723	1:30.834	N/A	13
14	101	(Australia) Ryder Quinn	M2 Competition	1:30.688	1:30.942	N/A	14
15	98	(New Zealand) James Penrose	Kiwi Motorsport	1:31.108	N/A	N/A	15
16	88	(United States) Chloe Chambers	Giles Motorsport	1:31.290	N/A	N/A	16
17	5	(Brazil) Lucas Fecury	Kiwi Motorsport	1:31.329	N/A	N/A	17
18	4	(New Zealand) Billy Frazer	Hamilton Motorsport	1:31.708	N/A	N/A	18
19	55	(New Zealand) Breanna Morris	Giles Motorsport	1:31.793	N/A	N/A	19
-	8	(Australia) Tom McLennan	Kiwi Motorsport	no time	N/A	N/A	-
107% time: 1:36.557

== Race ==
=== Race classification ===
Pos.	No.	Driver	Teams	Laps	Time/Retired	Grid
1	18	(Netherlands) Laurens van Hoepen	M2 Competition	28	42min 16.570sec	1
2	26	(United Kingdom) Louis Foster	Giles Motorsport	28	+ 0.846 s	2
3	17	(New Zealand) Callum Hedge	M2 Competition	28	+ 12.329 s	4
4	84	(New Zealand) Chris van der Drift	Hamilton Motorsport	28	+ 12.673 s	9
5	15	(New Zealand) Kaleb Ngatoa	Giles Motorsport	28	+ 14.923 s	3
6	23	(New Zealand) Liam Sceats	M2 Competition	28	+ 15.525 s	6
7	7	(Austria) Charlie Wurz	M2 Competition	28	+ 16.173 s	5
8	51	(United States) Jacob Abel	Kiwi Motorsport	28	+ 16.604 s	7
9	77	(United States) David Morales	M2 Competition	28	+ 17.499 s	8
10	101	(Australia) Ryder Quinn	M2 Competition	28	+ 18.051 s	14
11	66	(United States) Ryan Shehan	Giles Motorsport	28	+ 23.107 s	11
12	21	(United Kingdom) Josh Mason	Kiwi Motorsport	28	+ 24.859 s	10
13	98	(New Zealand) James Penrose	Kiwi Motorsport	28	+ 26.756 s	15
14	86	(New Zealand) Brendon Leitch	Kiwi Motorsport	28	+ 28.049 s	13
15	4	(New Zealand) Billy Frazer	Hamilton Motorsport	28	+ 32.652 s	18
16	36	(Republic of Ireland) Adam Fitzgerald	Giles Motorsport	28	+ 35.056 s	12
17	88	(United States) Chloe Chambers	Giles Motorsport	28	+ 36.342 s	16
18	55	(New Zealand) Breanna Morris	Giles Motorsport	28	+ 47.490 s	19
19	5	(Brazil) Lucas Fecury	Kiwi Motorsport	28	+ 48.132 s	17
WD	8	(Australia) Tom McLennan	Kiwi Motorsport	0	Withdrew	
Fastest lap: (Netherlands) Laurens van Hoepen (M2 Competition) – 1:30.061 (lap 10)

Preceded by 2021 New Zealand Grand Prix	New Zealand Grand Prix; 2023	Succeeded by 2024 New Zealand Grand Prix
