= 2021 New Zealand Grand Prix =

- Race 3, Round 1 of 3 of the 2021 Toyota Racing Series
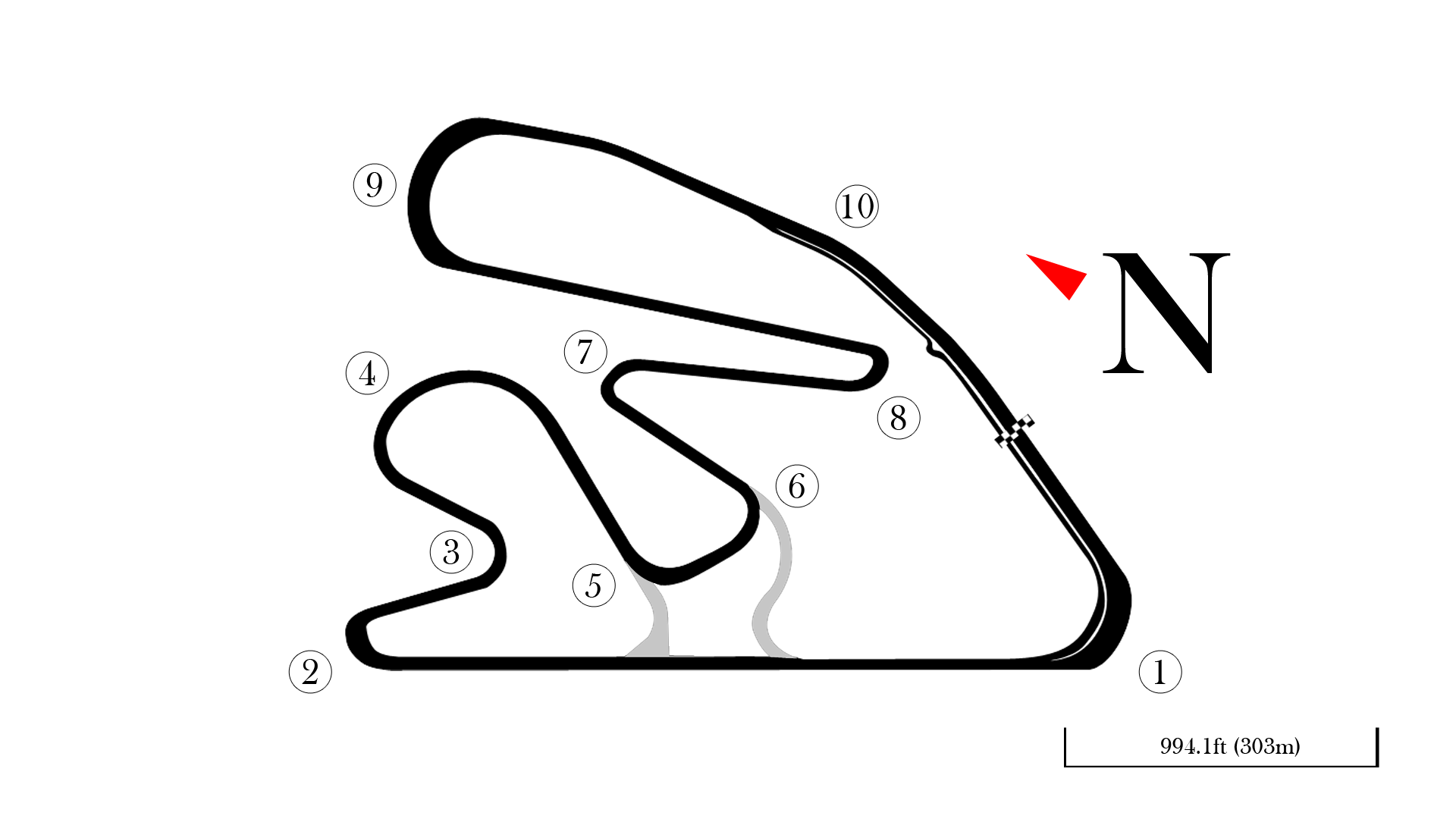

Race details
- Date: 24 January 2021
- Official name: LXVI New Zealand Grand Prix
- Location: Hampton Downs Motorsport Park, Waikato, New Zealand
- Course: Permanent racing facility
- Course length: 3.800 km (2.361 miles)
- Distance: 28 laps, 106.4 km (66.1 miles)
- Weather: Overcast

Pole position
Driver	(New Zealand) Kaleb Ngatoa	M2 Competition
- Time: 1:44.288

Fastest lap
Driver	(New Zealand) Shane van Gisbergen	M2 Competition
- Time: 1:30.627 on lap 20

Podium
First	(New Zealand) Shane van Gisbergen	M2 Competition
Second	(New Zealand) Andre Heimgartner	Giles Motorsport
Third	(New Zealand) Matthew Payne	M2 Competition

The 2021 New Zealand Grand Prix event for open wheel racing cars was held at Hampton Downs Motorsport Park in northern Waikato on 24 January 2021. It was the sixty-sixth New Zealand Grand Prix and fielded Toyota Racing Series cars. The event also served as the third race of the first round of the 2021 Toyota Racing Series. The race was won by Shane van Gisbergen, who started his race from the pit-lane as a result of a fire-extinguisher issue pre-race.

== Report ==
=== Qualifying ===
Pos	No	Driver	Team	Time	Grid
1	15	(New Zealand) Kaleb Ngatoa	M2 Competition	1:44.288	1
2	27	(New Zealand) Daniel Gaunt	Tasman Motorsports	1:44.353	2
3	31	(New Zealand) Chris van der Drift	Tasman Motorsports	1:44.417	3
4	7	(New Zealand) Matthew Payne	M2 Competition	1:44.563	4
5	51	(New Zealand) Greg Murphy	Kiwi Motorsport	1:44.739	5
6	11	(New Zealand) Conrad Clark		1:44.753	6
7	22	(New Zealand) Tom Alexander	Giles Motorsport	1:45.074	7
8	24	(New Zealand) Andre Heimgartner	Giles Motorsport	1:45.110	8
9	87	(New Zealand) Damon Leitch	Kiwi Motorsport	1:45.130	9
10	97	(New Zealand) Shane van Gisbergen	M2 Competition	1:45.169	PL
11	14	(New Zealand) Billy Frazer	M2 Competition	1:45.174	10
12	86	(New Zealand) Brendon Leitch	Kiwi Motorsport	1:45.183	14
13	84	(New Zealand) Peter Vodanovich	Giles Motorsport	1:45.329	11
14	32	(New Zealand) Josh Bethune	M2 Competition	1:46.422	12
15	3	(New Zealand) Chris Vlok	M2 Competition	1:46.532	13
16	50	(New Zealand) Ken Smith	Giles Motorsport	1:58.835	15

=== Race ===
Pos	No	Driver	Team	Laps	Time / Retired	Grid
1	97	(New Zealand) Shane van Gisbergen	M2 Competition	28	44min 51.627sec	PL
2	24	(New Zealand) Andre Heimgartner	Giles Motorsport	28	+ 2.269 s	8
3	7	(New Zealand) Matthew Payne	M2 Competition	28	+ 3.614 s	4
4	15	(New Zealand) Kaleb Ngatoa	M2 Competition	28	+ 8.897 s	1
5	31	(New Zealand) Chris van der Drift	Tasman Motorsports	28	+ 10.420 s	3
6	87	(New Zealand) Damon Leitch	Kiwi Motorsport	28	+ 10.458 s	9
7	86	(New Zealand) Brendon Leitch	Kiwi Motorsport	28	+ 12.084 s	14
8	27	(New Zealand) Daniel Gaunt	Tasman Motorsports	28	+ 13.561 s	2
9	14	(New Zealand) Billy Frazer	M2 Competition	28	+ 13.671 s	10
10	51	(New Zealand) Greg Murphy	Kiwi Motorsport	28	+ 14.091 s	5
11	11	(New Zealand) Conrad Clark		28	+ 14.532 s	6
12	22	(New Zealand) Tom Alexander	Giles Motorsport	28	+ 14.761 s	7
13	3	(New Zealand) Chris Vlok	M2 Competition	28	+ 19.020 s	13
14	32	(New Zealand) Josh Bethune	M2 Competition	28	+ 27.341 s	12
15	50	(New Zealand) Ken Smith	Giles Motorsport	26	+ 2 laps	15
Ret	84	(New Zealand) Peter Vodanovich	Giles Motorsport	5	Electrical	11

Preceded by 2020 New Zealand Grand Prix	Toyota Racing Series; 2021	Succeeded by 2021 Hampton Downs TRS round
Preceded by 2020 New Zealand Grand Prix	New Zealand Grand Prix; 2021	Succeeded by 2023 New Zealand Grand Prix
