= Chloe Chambers =

American racing driver (born 2004)

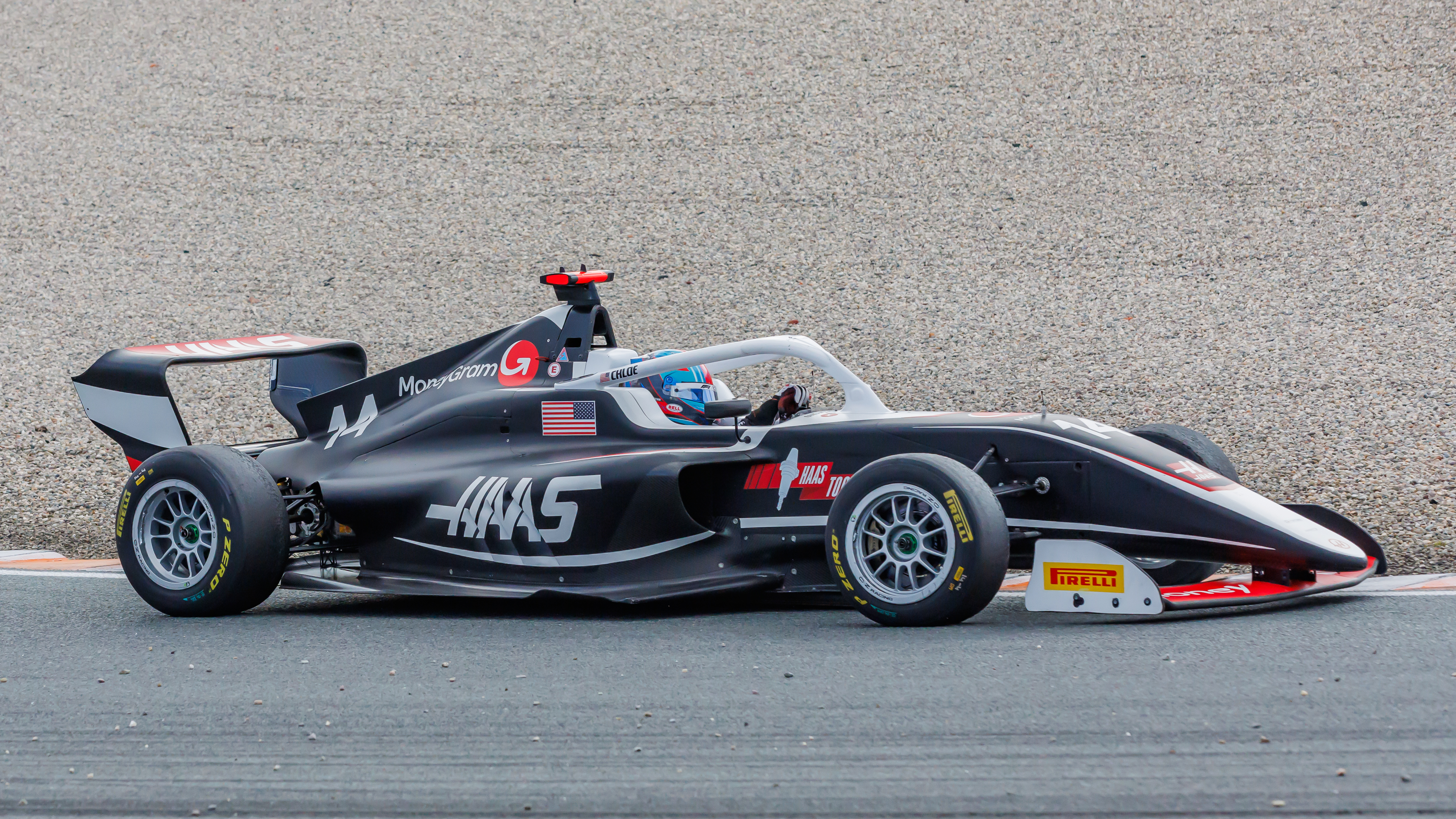
- Chambers driving the Tatuus F4-T421 during the 2024 F1 Academy season
- Nationality: (United States) American
- Born: June 14, 2004 (age 22) Guangdong, China

F1 Academy
- Categorisation: FIA Silver
- Years active: 2024–2025
- Teams: Campos Racing
- Car number: 14
- Starts: 27 (28 entries)
- Wins: 3
- Podiums: 11
- Poles: 4
- Fastest laps: 7
- Best finish: 3rd in 2025

Previous series
- 2024; 2023–2024; 2023; 2022; 2021; 2021; 2021: IMSA Ford Mustang Challenge; Porsche Sprint Challenge NA; FR Oceania; W Series; Eastern Pro 4 Challenge; YACademy Winter Series; F4 United States

Chloe Chambers (born June 14, 2004) is an American racing driver who is set to compete in the Lamborghini Super Trofeo North America for RAFA Racing Club and support from Monoflo International.

== Junior career ==
=== Karting ===
Chambers first tried karting at age seven. A year later, she started racing at Oakland Valley Race Park in New York, winning the Kid Kart Championship in her first year. She pursued karting at the club and regional level mainly in the North East United States and Canada in Rotax Micro, Mini and Junior Max categories. In 2018 and 2019, she competed select National level events in X30 and KA100 Junior categories. She finished third in the 2019 SKUSA SuperNationals XXIII in the X30 category.

=== Formula 4 United States ===
In 2021, Chambers competed in a partial season of the Formula 4 United States Championship racing for Future Star Racing. She only scored one point throughout the season, being a tenth place in Mid-Ohio, and finished the season in 26th place.

=== W Series ===
From 31 January 2022 to 4 February 2022, Chambers competed in a W Series test in Arizona, United States along with 14 other prospective drivers. She then participated in a second preseason test in Barcelona on 2–4 March along with 11 other potential drivers and nine automatic qualifiers from the previous W Series season. On 22 March 2022, Chambers was confirmed to compete in the 2022 W Series season racing for Jenner Racing alongside Jamie Chadwick. In the first race of the Miami double-header, Chambers finished in seventh place, and was the best-placed rookie across the line. However, she was demoted to 14th after receiving a penalty for being out of position at the safety car line. In the second race, Chambers claimed her first and only W Series points, finishing in 10th place as the highest-placed rookie. Chambers spun out of fourteenth place into the gravel on the final lap of the third race in Barcelona, before finishing thirteenth at Silverstone. Chambers was then taken out of the race at Paul Ricard by Emely de Heus, before finishing the season with a pair of eleventh-place finishes in Budapest and Singapore. Chambers finished 16th in the standings with only the one point earned from Miami.

=== Formula Regional Oceania Championship ===
In 2023, Chambers competed in the Formula Regional Oceania Championship with Giles Motorsport. Chambers scored consistently throughout the first four rounds, taking a best finish of ninth four times. In the final round in Taupo, she secured pole position for the second race and led the race throughout, becoming the first woman to both hold pole position and win in series history. Chambers placed ninth in the standings with 176 points, and was named Most Improved Driver.

=== Porsche Sprint Challenge North America ===
==== 2023 ====
In 2023, Chambers competed in the Porsche Sprint Challenge North America, driving the Cayman GT4 Club Sport. A month later, she was named as a member Porsche Deluxe Female Driver Development Program, therefore becoming a Porsche Junior. Unable to race in the first round at Sebring, her first race was at rounds 3 and 4 at Barber Motorsports Park, where she qualified on pole and won both races. Chambers won another race at Virginia International Raceway. Over the partial season, she won eight races and stood on the podium nine times from her 12 race starts, allowing her to finish sixth in the overall standings.

==== 2024 ====
In 2024, Chambers joined the series as a guest driver for round 2 at the Barber Motorsports Park, where she once again claimed pole position and victory for both races.

=== F1 Academy ===
==== 2024 ====
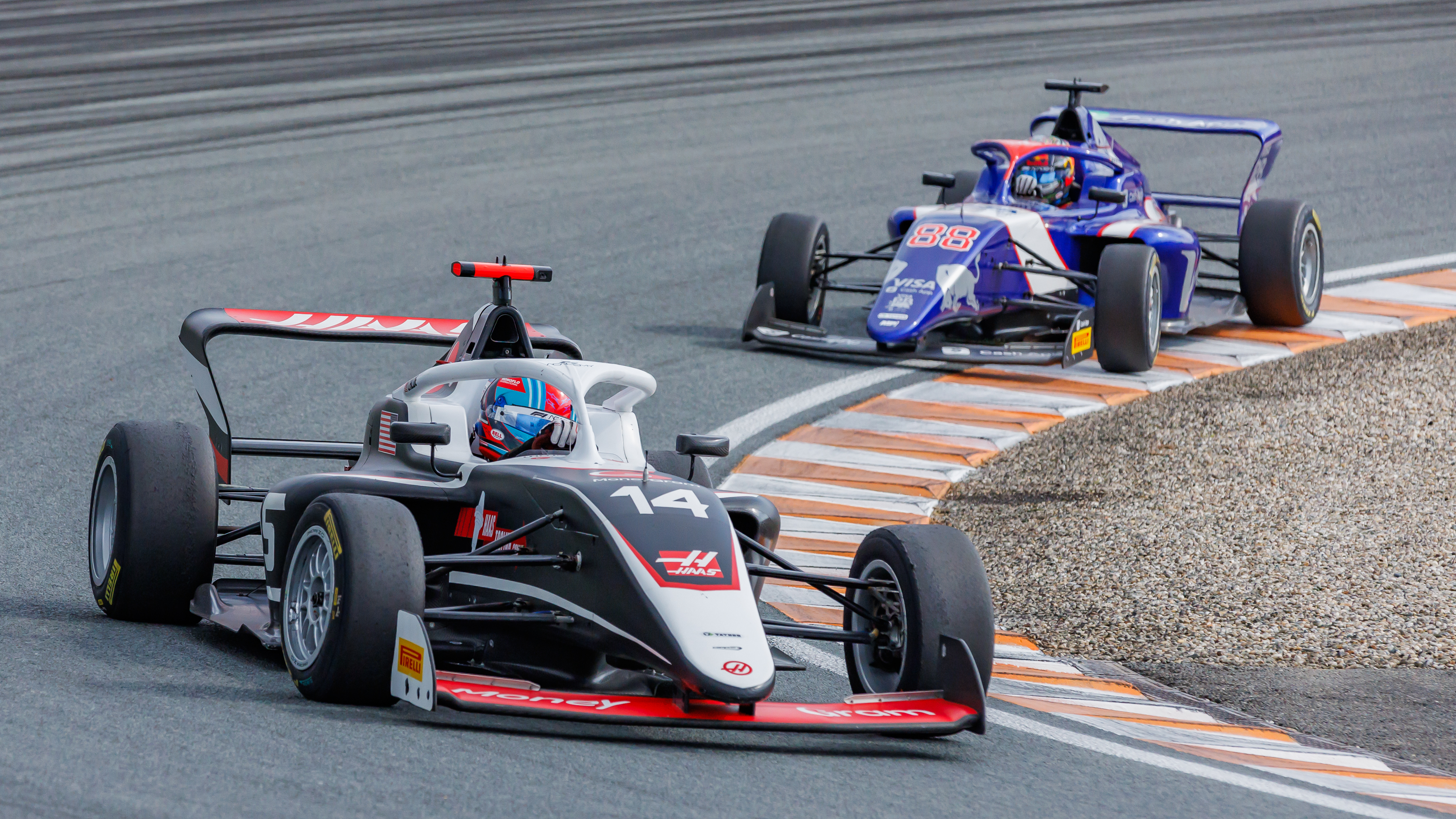
Chambers leads Amna Al Qubaisi in an F1 Academy race at Zandvoort in 2024.

Chambers was confirmed for the 2024 season of F1 Academy, racing for Campos Racing and supported by Haas. She won her first podium finish of the season by finishing in third in Race 1 of Round 2 at Miami. Chambers finished fourth in her first race in Jeddah, inheriting two places on the last lap from a collision between Nerea Martí and Lola Lovinfosse. The next day, Chambers tagged Lovinfosse into a spin, earning her a penalty that dropped her from sixth to tenth. In Miami, Chambers took her maiden podium in the first race, having made her way past Hamda Al Qubaisi on lap 11 to take third place. She backed her performance with fourth place the next day. Personal best qualifying performances in Barcelona lined her up on the front row for both races. She secured a third-place podium during the first race, having lost out a place at the start to teammate Martí. The next race, Chambers overtook won her first race of the series in Race 2 of Round 3 at Barcelona, overtaking pole-sitter Abbi Pulling at the start and leading throughout the race, finishing over six seconds ahead of Pulling while also winning the fastest lap.

Chambers experienced her first non-scoring race of the year in Zandvoort, where a difficult second race saw her down in 12th, while she finished sixth the previous day. She then experienced a solid weekend in Singapore with fifth and eighth place; in the latter race, she had dropped two places to 11th but was able to recover three places. At the Abu Dhabi finale, Chambers made the front row for all three races; despite shooting past Abbi Pulling for an early lead during the first race, but a costly spin in the opening relegated her to the back. Chambers again led the opening lap of Race 2, but she ran wide and lost her first place back to Pulling on lap 7. Nevertheless, she still wrapped up her first rostrum since Spain. However, Chambers collided with Doriane Pin on the opening lap and dropped to the back with wing damage, dashing any hopes of a top result. Despite this, Chambers placed sixth in the drivers' standings with 122 points, scoring one win and four podiums.

==== 2025 ====
Chambers was retained by Campos Racing for the 2025 season, but she moved to the Red Bull Ford Academy Programme after leaving the Haas Driver development program. She ended the season with two wins, seven podium finishes, four pole positions, and four fastest laps.

Her first win of the season was in Race 3 of Round 4 in Canada, where she converted pole to victory. At the Round 7 season finale in Las Vegas, Chambers retired from Race 1 after colliding with Campos teammate Alisha Palmowski. In Race 2, Chambers converted pole to victory again to claim her home race win, where she led every lap and earned a bonus point for setting the fastest lap.

Chambers finished third overall in the championship standings with 127 points, behind Maya Weug with 157 points and Doriane Pin with 172 points.

=== Formula Winter Series ===
In preparation for her 2025 F1 Academy season, Chambers contested in the Formula Winter Series with Campos Racing.

=== FIA Formula 3 ===
On September 17, 2022, Chambers took part in a one-day FIA Formula 3 test, completing 50 laps at the Circuit de Nevers Magny-Cours in France.

Chambers took part in a second test on July 12–13, 2024 at the Silverstone Circuit. Chambers drove 97 laps in a hybrid 2019 F3 car that had been modified to handle like the 2025 car.

== Formula E ==
Chambers made her first Formula E outing at the November 2024 women's test with Andretti in Jarama. Chambers was the fastest female with a time of 1:22.767 at the 2025–26 pre-season women's test in Valencia for Mahindra Racing topping both test sessions. Chambers drove for Mahindra Racing in the rookie free practice session at the Miami ePrix.

== Sportscar racing ==
Chambers will compete in the 2026 Lamborghini Super Trofeo North America season with RAFA Racing Club and support from Monoflo International.

== Personal life ==
Chambers was born in China but was adopted by Americans Matthew and Shannon Chambers from Monroe, New York at eleven months. Her siblings are also adopted. Her younger sister Emma is also from China and her younger brother Oliver is from Ethiopia. She is an ambassador for the non-profit Gift of Adoption Fund.

Chambers holds the Guinness World Record for the Fastest Vehicle Slalom. She set the record on August 21, 2020, racing a 2020 Porsche 718 Spyder and navigating 50 cones in 47.45 seconds.

Chambers is signed with A14 Management, Formula One World Champion Fernando Alonso's management company.

== Karting record ==
=== Karting career summary ===
Season	Series	Team	Position
2014	Florida Winter Tour - Micro Max	OVRP	24th
2016	Florida Winter Tour - Mini Max	Ben Cooper Racing	12th
2016	Canadian National Karting - Mini Max	Ben Cooper Racing	5th
2017	Florida Winter Tour - Mini Max	Ben Cooper Racing	7th
2018	GoPro Motorplex Championship - IAME Junior	Mike Doty Racing	
2018	Florida Winter Tour - Junior ROK	Mike Doty Racing	5th
2019	SKUSA SuperNationals XXIII - KA100 Jr.	Mike Doty Racing	
2019	SKUSA SuperNationals XXIII - X30 Junior	Mike Doty Racing	3rd
2019	Biloxi ROK Fest - Junior ROK	Mike Doty Racing	
2019	ROK the Rio - Junior ROK	Mike Doty Racing	21st
2019	Florida Winter Tour - Junior ROK	Mike Doty Racing	8th
2019	SKUSA Pro Tour - KA100 Junior	Mike Doty Racing	17th

== Racing record ==
=== Racing career summary ===
Season	Series	Team	Races	Wins	Poles	F/Laps	Podiums	Points	Position
2021	Formula 4 United States Championship	Future Star Racing	15	0	0	0	0	1	26th
2021	YACademy Winter Series	Future Star Racing	6	0	0	0	0	16	10th
2021	Eastern Pro 4 Challenge	N/A	2	0	0	0	1	71	8th
2022	W Series	Jenner Racing	7	0	0	0	0	1	16th
2023	Formula Regional Oceania Championship	Giles Motorsport	15	1	0	1	1	176	9th
2023	Porsche Sprint Challenge North America - Cayman Pro/Am	TPC Racing	12	7	7	5	8	576	6th
2024	F1 Academy	Campos Racing	14	1	0	2	4	122	6th
2024	Porsche Sprint Challenge North America - Cayman Pro/Am	TPC Racing	4	2	2	0	3	217	10th
2024	IMSA Ford Mustang Challenge	Amerasian Fragrance Competition Motorsports	2	0	0	0	0	740	24th
2024	IMSA Ford Mustang Challenge	Spark Performance	2	0	0	0	0	740	24th
2025	Formula Winter Series	Campos Racing	6	0	0	0	0	0	30th
2025	F1 Academy	Campos Racing	13	2	4	5	7	127	**3rd**
2026	Lamborghini Super Trofeo North America - Pro-Am	RAFA Racing Team	12	1	0	0	4	78	5th
2026	Indian Racing League	Hyderabad Blackbirds							

=== Complete Formula 4 United States Championship results ===
(key) (Races in bold indicate pole position) (Races in italics indicate fastest lap)

Year	Team	1	2	3	4	5	6	7	8	9	10	11	12	13	14	15	16	17	DC	Points
2021	Future Star Racing	ATL; 1; 17	ATL; 2 Ret	ATL; 3; 11	ROA; 1; 15	ROA; 2 Ret	ROA; 3; 11	MOH; 1; 10	MOH; 2; 22	MOH; 3; 26	BRA; 1; 7	BRA; 2 Ret	BRA; 3; 20	VIR; 1; 17	VIR; 2; 16	VIR; 3; 18	COA; 1	COA; 2	26th	1

=== Complete W Series results ===
(key) (Races in bold indicate pole position) (Races in italics indicate fastest lap)

Year	Team	1	2	3	4	5	6	7	DC	Points
2022	Jenner Racing	MIA1; 14	MIA2; 10	CAT; 18†	SIL; 13	LEC; Ret	HUN; 11	SIN; 11	16th	1

=== Complete Formula Regional Oceania Championship results ===
(key) (Races in bold indicate pole position) (Races in italics indicate fastest lap)

Year	Team	1	2	3	4	5	6	7	8	9	10	11	12	13	14	15	DC	Points
2023	Giles Motorsport	HIG; 1; 9	HIG; 2; 7	HIG; 3; 5	TER; 1; 10	TER; 2; 9	TER; 3; 8	MAN; 1; 9	MAN; 2; 14	MAN; 3; 9	HMP; 1; 16	HMP; 2; 14	HMP; 3; 17	TAU; 1; 8	TAU; 2; 1	TAU; 3; 8	9th	176

=== Complete New Zealand Grand Prix results ===
Year	Team	Car	Qualifying	Main race
2023	(New Zealand) Giles Motorsport	Tatuus FT-60 - Toyota	16th	17th

=== Complete F1 Academy results ===
(key) (Races in bold indicate pole position; races in italics indicate fastest lap)

Year	Team	1	2	3	4	5	6	7	8	9	10	11	12	13	14	15	DC	Points
2024	Campos Racing	JED; 1; 4	JED; 2; 10	MIA; 1; 3	MIA; 2; 4	CAT; 1; 3	CAT; 2; 1	ZAN; 1; 6	ZAN; 2; 12	SIN; 1; 5	SIN; 2; 8	LSL; 1; 11	LSL; 2 C	YMC; 1; 11	YMC; 2; 2	YMC; 3; 16	6th	122
2025	Campos Racing	SHA; 1; 2	SHA; 2; 3	JED; 1; 7	**JED**; **2**; 2	MIA; 1; 3	**MIA**; **2** C	**MTL**; **1**; 7	MTL; 2; 10	**MTL**; **3**; 1	ZAN; 1; 5	ZAN; 2 DNS	SIN; 1; 3	SIN; 2; 11	LVG; 1 Ret	**LVG**; **2**; 1	3rd	127

=== Complete Formula Winter Series results ===
(key) (Races in bold indicate pole position) (Races in italics indicate fastest lap)

Year	Team	1	2	3	4	5	6	7	8	9	10	11	12	DC	Points
2025	Campos Racing	POR; 1	POR; 2	POR; 3	CRT; 1; 21	CRT; 2; 17	CRT; 3; 13	ARA; 1; 22	ARA; 2; 26	ARA; 3; 20	CAT; 1	CAT; 2	CAT; 3	30th	0

=== Complete Lamborghini Super Trofeo North America results ===
(key) (Races in bold indicate pole position; races in italics indicate fastest lap)

Year	Team	Class	1	2	3	4	5	6	7	8	9	10	11	12	DC	Points
2026	RAFA Racing Team	Pro-Am	SEB; 1; 7	SEB; 2; 9	LGA; 1; 9	LGA; 2; 5	WGL; 1; 8	WGL; 2; 2	ELK; 1; 2	ELK; 2; 1	IND; 1; 3	IND; 2; 5	MNZ; 1; 5	MNZ; 2; 9	5th	78
