= Laurens van Hoepen =

Dutch racing driver (born 2005)

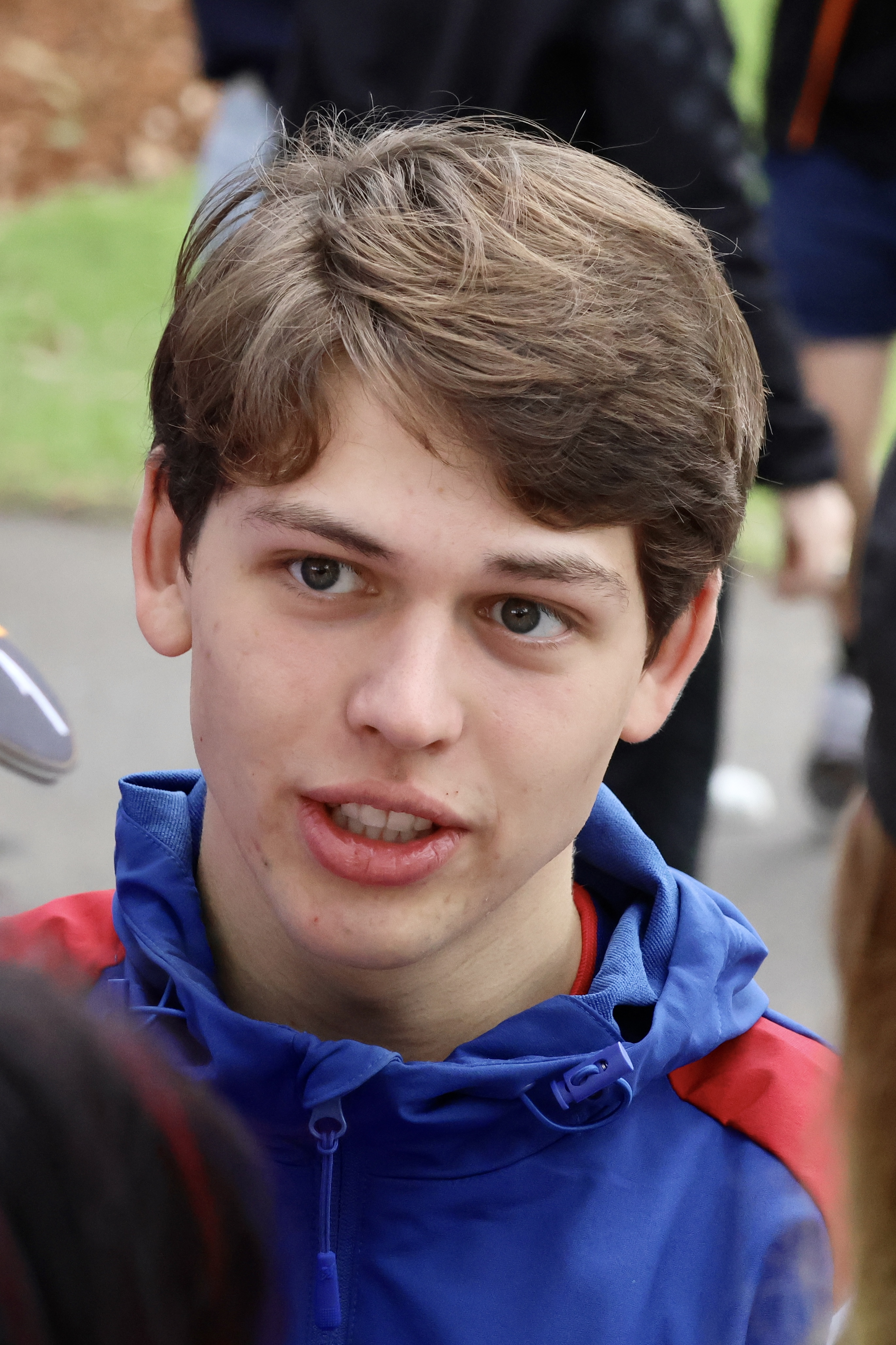
- Van Hoepen at the 2026 Melbourne Formula 2 round
- Nationality: (Netherlands) Dutch
- Born: 6 September 2005 (age 21) Wassenaar, South Holland, Netherlands

FIA Formula 2 Championship career
- Debut season: 2025
- Current team: Trident
- Car number: 24
- Starts: 23 (24 entries)
- Wins: 0
- Podiums: 3
- Poles: 1
- Fastest laps: 0
- Best finish: 25th in 2025

Previous series
- 2024–2025; 2023; 2022–2023; 2021: FIA Formula 3 FR Oceania FR European; Ultimate Cup Series
- Statistics up to date as of 25 August 2026.

Laurens van Hoepen (Dutch pronunciation: [ˈlʌurəns fɑn ˈɦupə(n)]; born 6 September 2005) is a Dutch racing driver who competes in the FIA Formula 2 Championship with Trident.

Van Hoepen previously competed in the Formula Regional European Championship with the French outfit in 2022 and 2023, having previously raced in the Ultimate Cup Series in 2021. He stepped up to the FIA Formula 3 Championship with ART Grand Prix for 2024 and 2025.

== Career ==
=== Karting ===
Van Hoepen started karting at the age of eight in his native Netherlands, winning a series of national championships before jumping onto the international scene in 2015. A protégé of Formula 2 and Formula E champion Nyck de Vries, he won the IAME Euro Series in the X30 Mini class in 2017, and finished in the top-ten of both the FIA European Championship and the WSK Champions Cup in OK in 2020, driving for Nico Rosberg's Racing Academy and Charles Leclerc's Leclerc by Lennox Racing respectively. For 2021, he remained with Leclerc's team and made the step up to KZ2 shifter karts, finishing third overall in the CIK-FIA Karting European Championship.

=== Formula Regional ===
==== 2021 ====
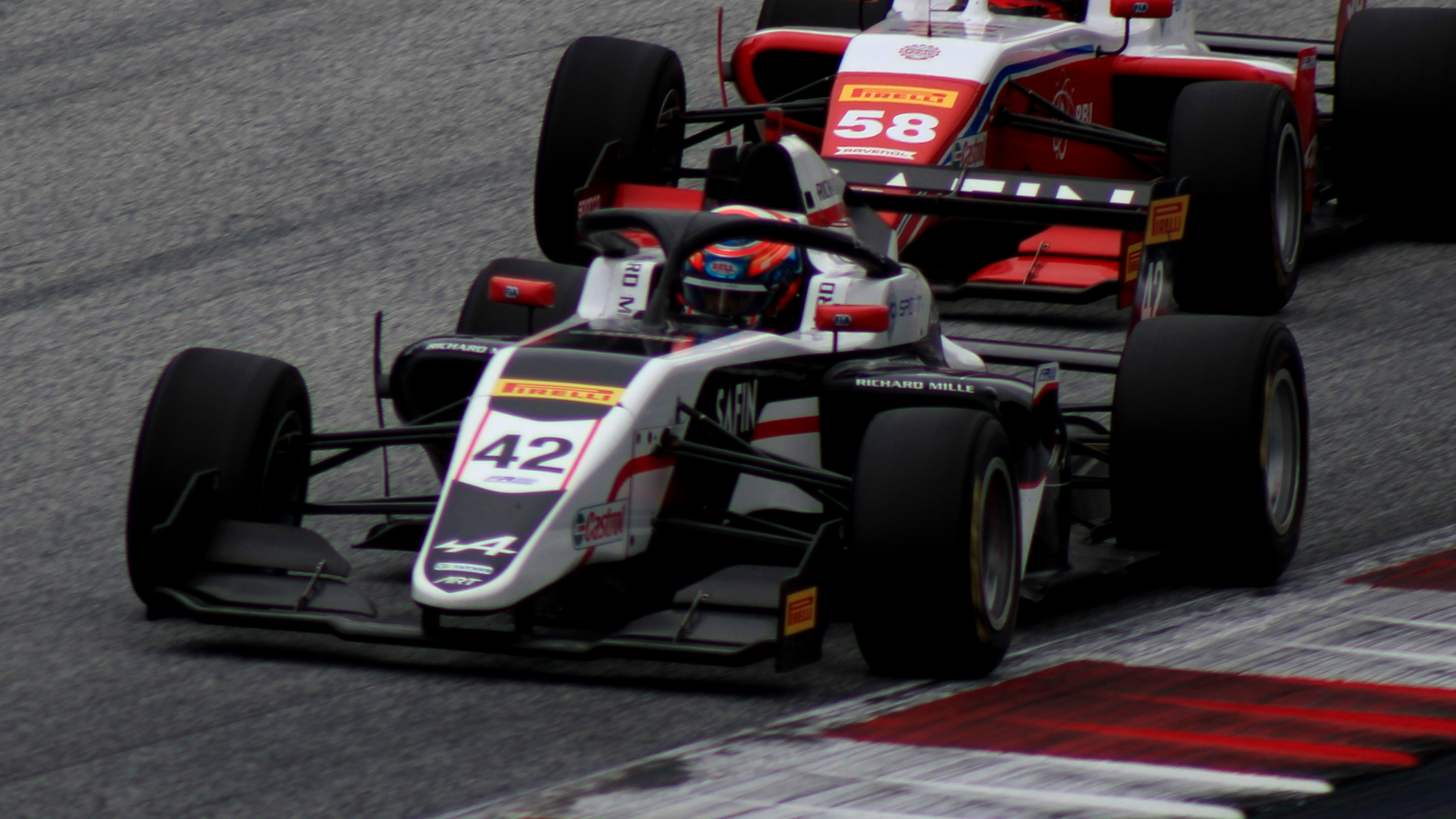
Van Hoepen racing in the 2022 Formula Regional European Championship at the Red Bull Ring.

Van Hoepen made his racing debut directly in Formula Regional machinery in late 2021, driving for Graff Racing in the Challenge Monoplace category of the Ultimate Cup Series. He hit the ground running, winning his first ever single-seater race from pole at Le Mans, ahead of Formula E race winner and 24 Hours of Le Mans class winner Nico Prost. He would go on to win seven of the nine races he entered—enough to claim third in the championship standings despite having missed the first half of the season.

==== 2022 ====
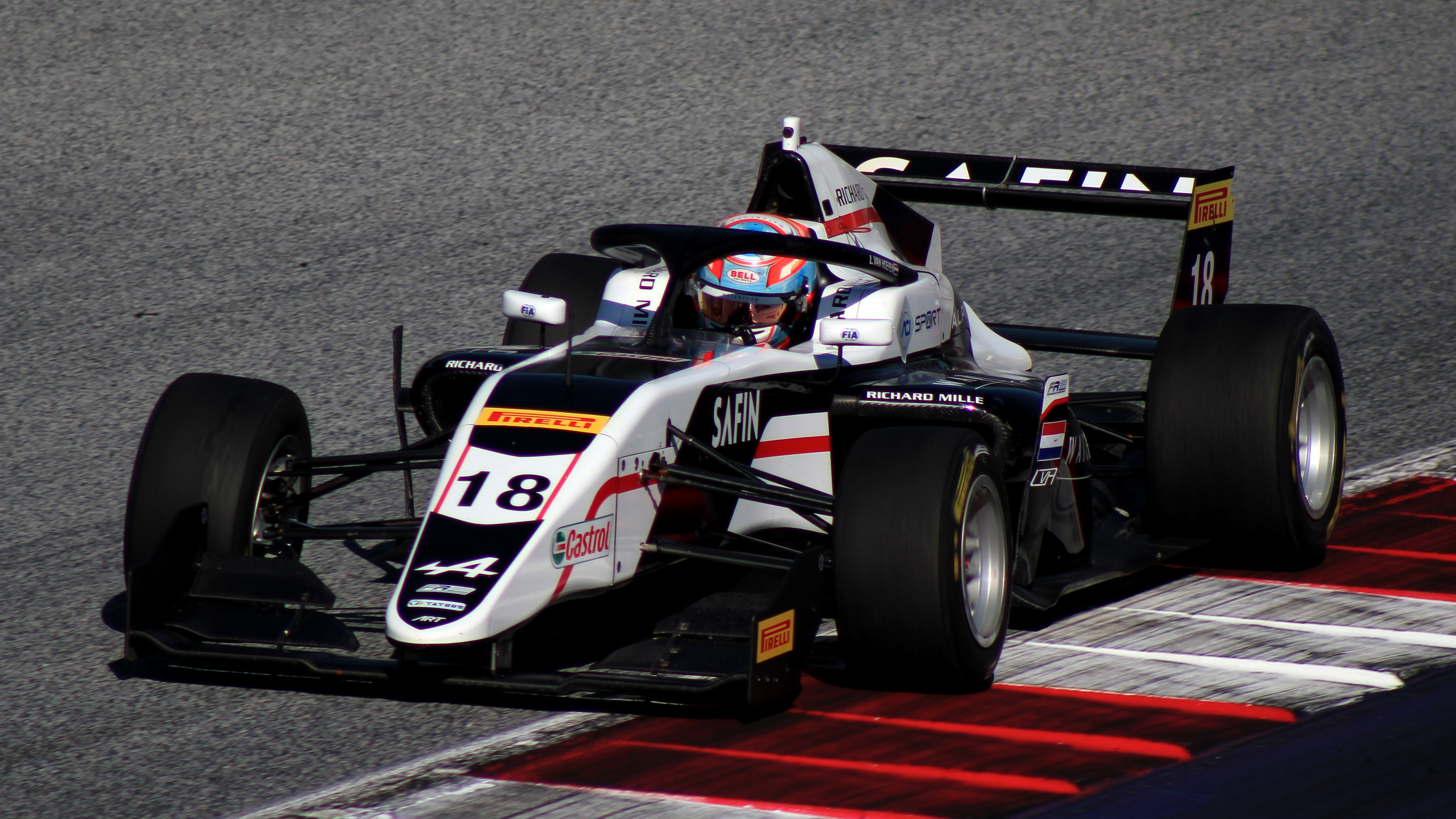
Van Hoepen racing in the 2023 Formula Regional European Championship at the Red Bull Ring.

For the 2022 season, van Hoepen moved to the Formula Regional European Championship with ART Grand Prix, partnering Gabriele Minì and Mari Boya. Though he only finished 21st in the standings, van Hoepen managed to claim two rookie class wins, both coming around the streets of Monaco.

==== 2023 ====
After taking part in two rounds of the Formula Regional Oceania Championship at the start of 2023, where he won the New Zealand Grand Prix following a brief battle with Louis Foster, van Hoepen remained at ART in the European Championship. With several more points finishes, as well as two podiums at Zandvoort, he improved to tenth overall.

=== FIA Formula 3 Championship ===
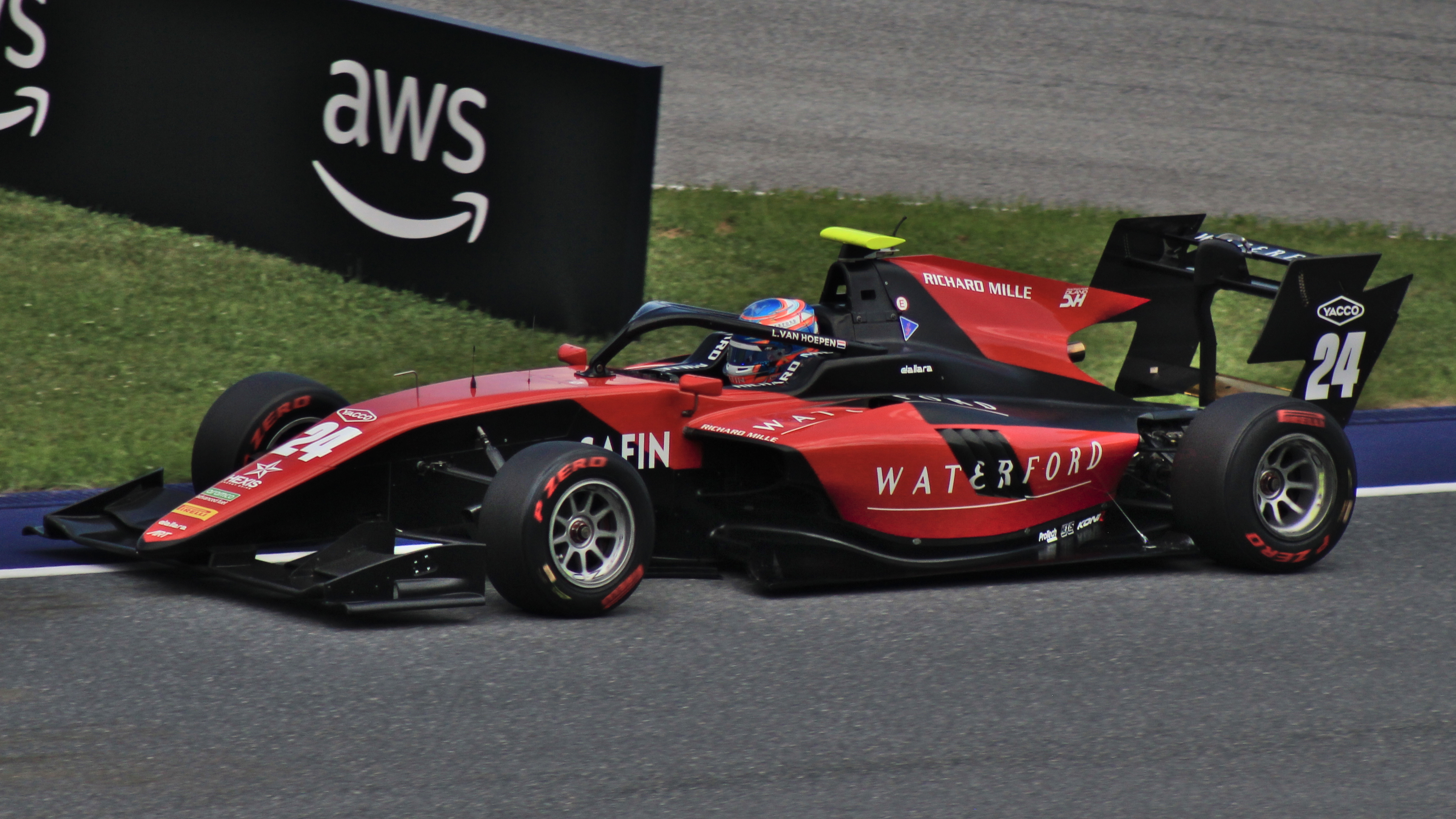
Van Hoepen driving the Dallara F3 2019 during the 2024 Spielberg Formula 3 round

==== 2024 ====
Van Hoepen joined ART Grand Prix for the 2023 Formula 3 post-season testing sessions. Following that, he took part in the Macau Grand Prix, finishing tenth, before being confirmed as an ART driver for the 2024 FIA F3 season in December. Van Hoepen began the year by fighting for victory at the Bahrain sprint race, losing out to Arvid Lindblad but overcoming teammate Nikola Tsolov to finish second on debut. He scored another sprint race podium at Melbourne, as he finished third following battles with Lindblad and eventual winner Martinius Stenshorne. After continuing his sprint scoring streak on Saturday at Imola, van Hoepen finished third in the Monaco sprint, having been passed by Tim Tramnitz at the start. He made progress on Sunday, passing Noel León at Mirabeau, before crashing out at Tabac while trying to overtake Joseph Loake. Fifth in the Barcelona and Spielberg sprints in races that included multiple wheel-to-wheel fights preceded Van Hoepen's first feature race points finish of the year — eighth place and a fastest lap in Austria.

Further points followed on Saturday at Silverstone before van Hoepen qualified on pole at the Hungaroring, benefiting from a late red flag which came out before many of the other contenders could set a lap time. Despite losing the lead to Tsolov on lap 1, van Hoepen crossed the line in second; however, he would be disqualified due to his car being underweight, which was later revealed to have been caused by a water radiator leak. Van Hoepen scored more points in the sprint at Spa and the feature in Monza, where he had risen from 29th on the grid owing to an accident in qualifying caused by Kacper Sztuka to 13th and eighth in the two races. This meant that he finished 13th in the championship, behind more experienced teammates Tsolov and Christian Mansell.

==== 2025 ====
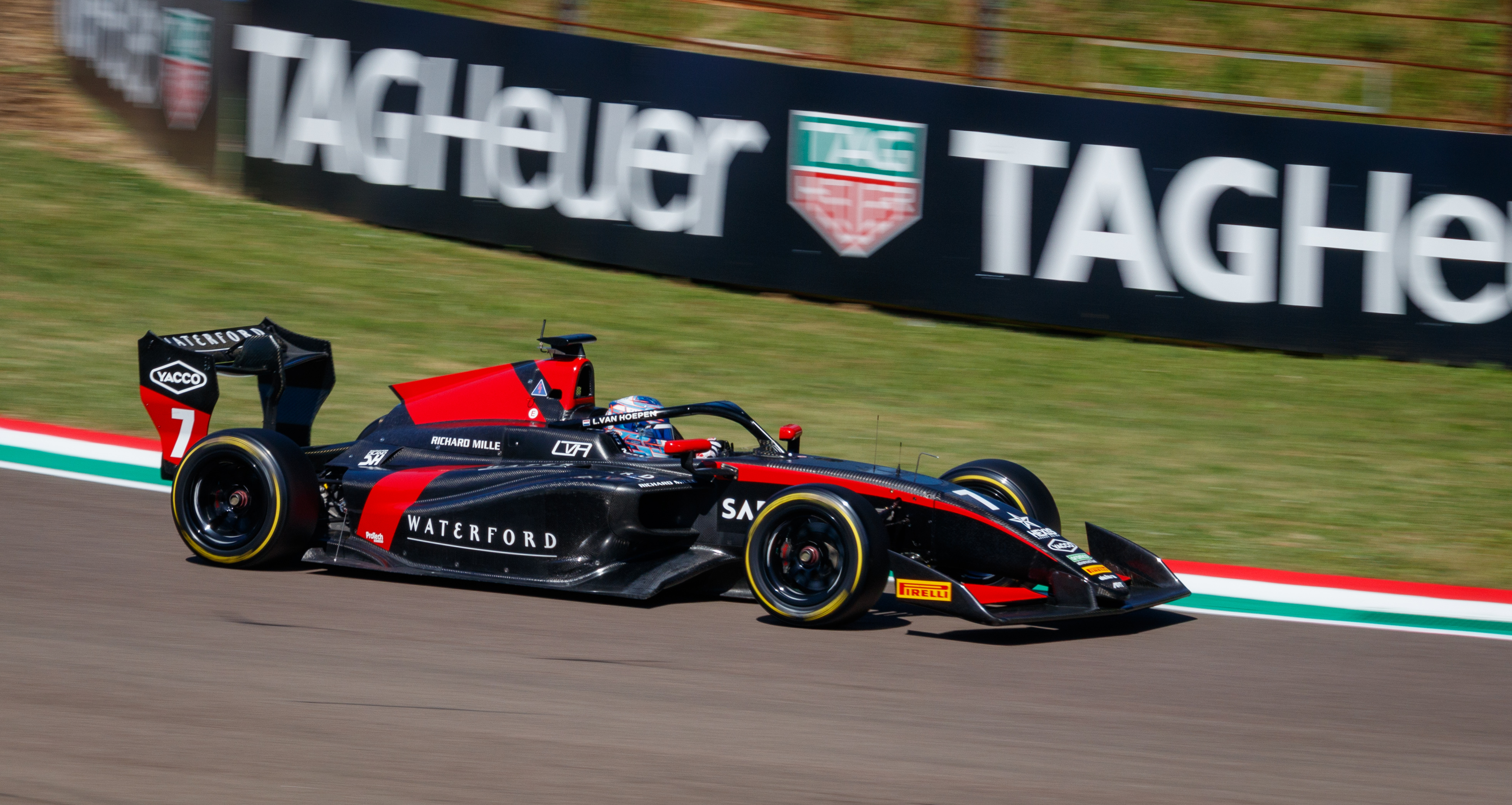
Van Hoepen driving the Dallara F3 2025 during the 2025 Imola Formula 3 round

Van Hoepen remained at ART Grand Prix for the 2025 season, in what was his fourth consecutive year with the French team.

=== FIA Formula 2 Championship ===
==== 2025 ====
Shortly after the F3 season finale, Trident confirmed that van Hoepen would step up to Formula 2 with them in the Baku Formula 2 round alongside Martinius Stenshorne. He would continue to race for the team during the final two rounds of the season.

==== 2026 ====
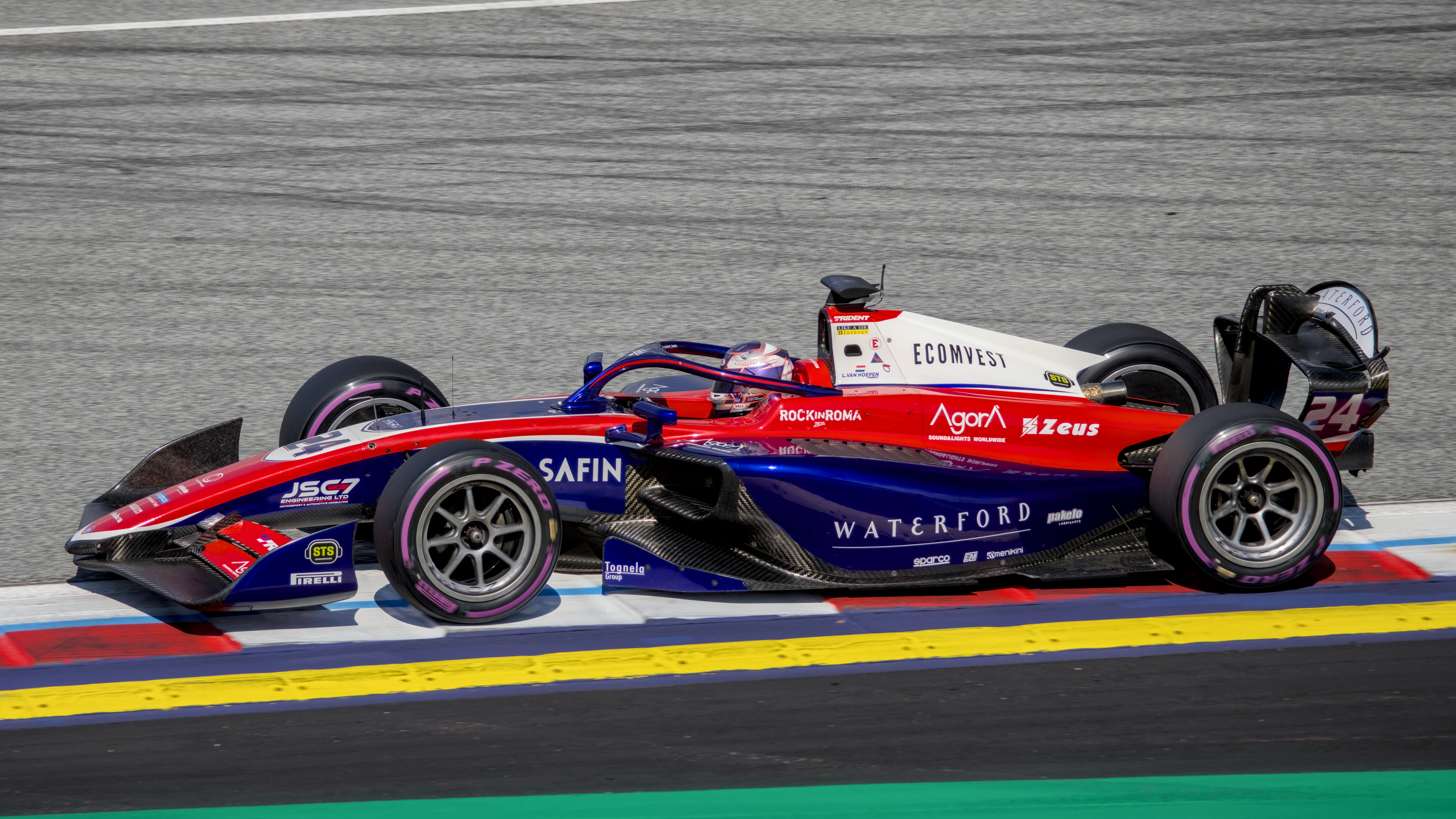
Van Hoepen driving the Dallara F2 2024 during the 2026 Spielberg Formula 2 round

Van Hoepen continued with Trident for a full 2026 season, teaming up with John Bennett.

==== 2027 ====
Van Hoepen is set to move to MP Motorsport for the 2027 season.

=== Formula One ===
In May 2026, Van Hoepen made his debut in Formula One machinery with the Williams F1 Team, driving at the Hungaroring in a private test.

== Karting record ==
=== Karting career summary ===
Season	Series	Position
2015	SKUSA SuperNationals XIX - TaG Cadet	61st
2017	IAME Euro Series - X30 Mini	1st
2017	WSK Super Master Series - 60 Mini	34th
2018	CIK-FIA European OK Junior Championship	25th
2018	CIK-FIA Karting World Championship - Junior	24th
2018	WSK Final Cup - OKJ	9th
2018	WSK Super Master Series - OKJ	11th
2018	German Junior Kart Championship - OK-Junior	7th
2018	23° South Garda Winter Cup - OKJ	8th
2019	WSK Open Cup - OK class	21st
2019	Italian Championship - OK-Junior	12th
2019	CIK-FIA Karting European Championship - OK-Junior	27th
2019	FIA Karting World Championship - OK-Junior	8th
2019	WSK Euro Series - OK-Junior	8th
2019	WSK Champions Cup - OK Junior	13th
2019	WSK Super Master Series - OK Junior	5th
2019	24° South Garda Winter Cup - OK Junior	13th
2020	WSK Open Cup - KZ2	11th
2020	CIK-FIA World Championship - OK class	31st
2020	WSK Euro Series - OK	17th
2020	CIK-FIA European Championship - OK	8th
2020	FIA Karting International Super Cup - KZ2	80th
2020	25° South Garda Winter Cup - OK	32nd
2020	WSK Super Master Series - OK	17th
2020	WSK Champions Cup - OK	6th
2021	Andrea Margutti Trophy - KZ2	4th
2021	FIA Karting International Super Cup - KZ2	17th
2021	WSK Open Cup - KZ2	7th
2021	WSK Euro Series - KZ2	10th
2021	WSK Super Master Series - KZ2	38th
2021	WSK Champions Cup - KZ2	28th
2021	CIK-FIA European Championship - KZ2	3rd

== Racing record ==
=== Racing career summary ===
Season	Series	Team	Races	Wins	Poles	F/Laps	Podiums	Points	Position
2021	Ultimate Cup Series - Challenge Monoplace - F3 Regional	Graff	9	7	6	8	9	324	**3rd**
2022	Formula Regional European Championship	ART Grand Prix	20	0	0	0	0	15	21st
2023	Formula Regional Oceania Championship	M2 Competition	6	1	2	1	5	154	11th
2023	Formula Regional European Championship	ART Grand Prix	20	0	0	0	2	71	10th
2023	Macau Grand Prix	ART Grand Prix	1	0	0	0	0	N/A	10th
2024	FIA Formula 3 Championship	ART Grand Prix	20	0	1	1	3	58	13th
2025	FIA Formula 3 Championship	ART Grand Prix	19	0	0	1	2	60	12th
2025	FIA Formula 2 Championship	Trident	5	0	0	0	0	0	25th
2026	FIA Formula 2 Championship	Trident	25	0	1	0	5	90*	10th*
2027	FIA Formula 2 Championship	MP Motorsport	0	0	0	0	0	0	TBD

* Season still in progress.

=== Complete Ultimate Cup Series results ===
(key) (Races in bold indicate pole position) (Races in italics indicate fastest lap)

Year	Team	1	2	3	4	5	6	7	8	9	10	11	12	13	14	15	16	17	18	DC	Points
2021	Graff	LEC1; 1	LEC1; 2	LEC1; 3	DIJ; 1	DIJ; 2	DIJ; 3	LEC2; 1	LEC2; 2	LEC2; 3	**LMS**; **1**; 1	**LMS**; **2**; 3	LMS; 3; 1	**MAG**; **1**; 1	**MAG**; **2**; 1	MAG; 3; 2	**EST**; **1**; 1	**EST**; **2**; 1	EST; 3; 1	3rd	324

=== Complete Formula Regional European Championship results ===
(key) (Races in bold indicate pole position) (Races in italics indicate fastest lap)

Year	Team	1	2	3	4	5	6	7	8	9	10	11	12	13	14	15	16	17	18	19	20	DC	Points
2022	ART Grand Prix	MNZ; 1 Ret	MNZ; 2 Ret	IMO; 1; 20	IMO; 2; 13	MCO; 1; 8	MCO; 2; 8	LEC; 1; 18	LEC; 2; 13	ZAN; 1; 19	ZAN; 2; 21	HUN; 1; 11	HUN; 2; 15	SPA; 1; 20	SPA; 2; 15	RBR; 1; 8	RBR; 2 Ret	CAT; 1; 18	CAT; 2; 19	MUG; 1; 10	MUG; 2; 17	21st	15
2023	ART Grand Prix	IMO; 1; 11	IMO; 2; 12	CAT; 1; 10	CAT; 2; 9	HUN; 1; 13	HUN; 2; 5	SPA; 1; 19	SPA; 2; 16	MUG; 1; 16	MUG; 2; 22†	LEC; 1; 6	LEC; 2 Ret	RBR; 1; 17	RBR; 2; 20	MNZ; 1; 7	MNZ; 2; 5	ZAN; 1; 3	ZAN; 2; 3	HOC; 1; 9	HOC; 2; 18	10th	71

† – Driver did not finish the race but was classified, as he completed more than 90% of the race distance.

=== Complete Formula Regional Oceania Championship results ===
(key) (Races in bold indicate pole position) (Races in italics indicate fastest lap)

Year	Team	1	2	3	4	5	6	7	8	9	10	11	12	13	14	15	DC	Points
2023	M2 Competition	HIG; 1	HIG; 2	HIG; 3	TER; 1	TER; 2	TER; 3	MAN; 1	MAN; 2	MAN; 3	**HMP**; **1**; 2	HMP; 2; 3	**HMP**; **3**; 1	TAU; 1; 3	TAU; 2; 4	TAU; 3; 2	11th	154

=== Complete Macau Grand Prix results ===
Year	Team	Car	Qualifying	Quali Race	Main race
2023	(France) ART Grand Prix	Dallara F3 2019	22nd	14th	10th

=== Complete FIA Formula 3 Championship results ===
(key) (Races in bold indicate pole position) (Races in italics indicate fastest lap)

Year	Entrant	1	2	3	4	5	6	7	8	9	10	11	12	13	14	15	16	17	18	19	20	DC	Points
2024	ART Grand Prix	BHR; SPR; 2	BHR; FEA; 15	MEL; SPR; 3	MEL; FEA; 13	IMO; SPR; 7	IMO; FEA; 13	MON; SPR; 3	MON; FEA; Ret	CAT; SPR; 5	CAT; FEA; 29†	RBR; SPR; 5	RBR; FEA; 8	SIL; SPR; 9	SIL; FEA; 11	HUN; SPR; 9	**HUN**; **FEA**; DSQ	SPA; SPR; 10	SPA; FEA; 12	MNZ; SPR; 13	MNZ; FEA; 8	13th	58
2025	ART Grand Prix	MEL; SPR; Ret	MEL; FEA; 12	BHR; SPR; 16	BHR; FEA; 12	IMO; SPR; 17	IMO; FEA; 10	MON; SPR; 3	MON; FEA; 6	CAT; SPR; 4	CAT; FEA; 4	RBR; SPR; 12	RBR; FEA; DSQ	SIL; SPR; 4	SIL; FEA; 7	SPA; SPR; 23	SPA; FEA; C	HUN; SPR; 19	HUN; FEA; 8	MNZ; SPR; 3	MNZ; FEA; 23	12th	60

=== Complete FIA Formula 2 Championship results ===
(key) (Races in bold indicate pole position) (Races in italics indicate fastest lap)

Year	Entrant	1	2	3	4	5	6	7	8	9	10	11	12	13	14	15	16	17	18	19	20	21	22	23	24	25	26	27	28	29	DC	Points
2025	Trident	MEL; SPR	MEL; FEA	BHR; SPR	BHR; FEA	JED; SPR	JED; FEA	IMO; SPR	IMO; FEA	MON; SPR	MON; FEA	CAT; SPR	CAT; FEA	RBR; SPR	RBR; FEA	SIL; SPR	SIL; FEA	SPA; SPR	SPA; FEA	HUN; SPR	HUN; FEA	MNZ; SPR	MNZ; FEA	BAK; SPR; 17	BAK; FEA; 17	LSL; SPR; 19	LSL; FEA; 18	YMC; SPR; 14	YMC; FEA; DNS		25th	0
2026	Trident	MEL; SPR; 7	MEL; FEA; 3	MIA; SPR; 2	MIA; FEA; 11	MTL; SPR; 4	**MTL**; **FEA**; Ret	MON; SPR; 19	MON; FEA; 12	CAT; SPR; 19	CAT; FEA; 5	RBR; SPR; 15	RBR; FEA; 8	SIL; SPR; 14	SIL; FEA; 17	SPA; SPR; 10	SPA; FEA; Ret	HUN; SPR; 3	HUN; FEA; 4	MNZ; SPR; 8	MNZ; FEA; 12	MAD; SPR; 3	MAD; FEA; 12	BAK; SPR; 2	BAK; FEA1; Ret	BAK; FEA2; 5	LSL; SPR	LSL; FEA	YMC; SPR	YMC; FEA	10th*	90*
2027	MP Motorsport	BHR; SPR	BHR; FEA	JED; SPR	JED; FEA	MEL; SPR	MEL; FEA	MTL; SPR	MTL; FEA	MON; SPR	MON; FEA	SIL; SPR	SIL; FEA	RBR; SPR	RBR; FEA	MNZ; SPR	MNZ; FEA	MAD; SPR	MAD; FEA	BAK; SPR	BAK; FEA	IST; SPR	IST; FEA	MXC; SPR	MXC; FEA	LSL; SPR	LSL; FEA	YMC; SPR	YMC; FEA		TBD	TBD

* Season still in progress.

Sporting positions
Preceded by Shane van Gisbergen	New Zealand Grand Prix; Winner; 2023	Succeeded by Liam Sceats
