= 2023 Formula Regional Oceania Championship =

Motor racing competition

The 2023 Castrol Toyota Formula Regional Oceania Championship was the inaugural season of the Formula Regional Oceania Championship. It was originally planned to be the eighteenth running of the Toyota Racing Series, the premier open-wheel motorsport category held in New Zealand, before the series was rebranded to become a fully FIA-certified Formula Regional championship. It was held over five consecutive weekends in January and February 2023.

Charlie Wurz, driving for M2 Competition, claimed the drivers' championship title in the final race of the season.

== Entry list ==
All drivers competed with identical Tatuus FT-60 chassis cars powered by 2.0L turbocharged Toyota engines. After the 2021 season was run without any officially recognized teams, the series returned to a team-based format.

Team	No.	Driver	Status	Rounds
Hamilton Motorsport	4	(New Zealand) Billy Frazer		3–4
Hamilton Motorsport	84	(New Zealand) Chris van der Drift	G	4
Kiwi Motorsport	5	(Brazil) Lucas Fecury	R	All
Kiwi Motorsport	8	(Australia) Tom McLennan	R	All
Kiwi Motorsport	21	(United Kingdom) Josh Mason		All
Kiwi Motorsport	51	(United States) Jacob Abel		All
Kiwi Motorsport	86	(New Zealand) Brendon Leitch		4
Kiwi Motorsport	98	(New Zealand) James Penrose	R	All
M2 Competition	7	(Austria) Charlie Wurz	R	All
M2 Competition	17	(New Zealand) Callum Hedge	R	All
M2 Competition	18	(Netherlands) Laurens van Hoepen		4–5
M2 Competition	23	(New Zealand) Liam Sceats	R	All
M2 Competition	77	(United States) David Morales	R	All
M2 Competition	101	(Australia) Ryder Quinn	R	All
Giles Motorsport	15	(New Zealand) Kaleb Ngatoa		4–5
Giles Motorsport	26	(United Kingdom) Louis Foster		3–5
Giles Motorsport	36	(Republic of Ireland) Adam Fitzgerald	R	3–5
Giles Motorsport	55	(New Zealand) Breanna Morris	R	All
Giles Motorsport	66	(United States) Ryan Shehan	R	All
Giles Motorsport	88	(United States) Chloe Chambers		All

Icon	Status
R	Rookie
G	Guest driver

- mtec Motorsport planned to field multiple cars, but later confirmed to have withdrawn their entry.

== Race calendar ==
Two years in a row, the championship was heavily influenced by the COVID-19 pandemic: the 2021 season had a heavily shortened calendar compared to previous seasons and the 2022 season was cancelled entirely.

As New Zealand's border restrictions were eased in late 2022, the 2023 season saw the return of a pre-pandemic calendar, with rounds on both the North and the South Island. On 30 May 2022, a five-round calendar was announced. The round at Hampton Downs Motorsport Park was later confirmed to become the 67th running of the New Zealand Grand Prix.

Round		Circuit	Date	Support bill	Map of circuit locations
1	R1	Highlands Motorsport Park (Cromwell, Otago)	14 January	Toyota Finance 86 Championship; Pirelli Porsche Race Series; GT New Zealand Championship	2023 Formula Regional Oceania Championship is located in New Zealand
1	R2	Highlands Motorsport Park (Cromwell, Otago)	15 January	Toyota Finance 86 Championship; Pirelli Porsche Race Series; GT New Zealand Championship	2023 Formula Regional Oceania Championship is located in New Zealand
1	R3	Highlands Motorsport Park (Cromwell, Otago)	15 January	Toyota Finance 86 Championship; Pirelli Porsche Race Series; GT New Zealand Championship	2023 Formula Regional Oceania Championship is located in New Zealand
2	R1	Teretonga Park Raceway (Invercargill, Southland)	21 January	Toyota Finance 86 Championship; Motorsport NZ Southern Sprint	2023 Formula Regional Oceania Championship is located in New Zealand
2	R2	Teretonga Park Raceway (Invercargill, Southland)	22 January	Toyota Finance 86 Championship; Motorsport NZ Southern Sprint	2023 Formula Regional Oceania Championship is located in New Zealand
2	R3	Teretonga Park Raceway (Invercargill, Southland)	22 January	Toyota Finance 86 Championship; Motorsport NZ Southern Sprint	2023 Formula Regional Oceania Championship is located in New Zealand
3	R1	Manfeild: Circuit Chris Amon (Feilding, Manawatū District)	28 January	MCC Saloons; HVRA Historic Saloons; MX5 Racing NZ Summer Series	2023 Formula Regional Oceania Championship is located in New Zealand
3	R2	Manfeild: Circuit Chris Amon (Feilding, Manawatū District)	29 January	MCC Saloons; HVRA Historic Saloons; MX5 Racing NZ Summer Series	2023 Formula Regional Oceania Championship is located in New Zealand
3	R3	Manfeild: Circuit Chris Amon (Feilding, Manawatū District)	29 January	MCC Saloons; HVRA Historic Saloons; MX5 Racing NZ Summer Series	2023 Formula Regional Oceania Championship is located in New Zealand
4	R1	Hampton Downs Motorsport Park (Hampton Downs, North Waikato)	4 February	New Zealand Grand Prix; Toyota Finance 86 Championship; New Zealand Formula First Championship; New Zealand Formula Ford Championship; GT New Zealand Championship; D1NZ National Drifting Championship; Central Muscle Cars; GT Racing New Zealand	2023 Formula Regional Oceania Championship is located in New Zealand
4	R2	Hampton Downs Motorsport Park (Hampton Downs, North Waikato)	5 February	New Zealand Grand Prix; Toyota Finance 86 Championship; New Zealand Formula First Championship; New Zealand Formula Ford Championship; GT New Zealand Championship; D1NZ National Drifting Championship; Central Muscle Cars; GT Racing New Zealand	2023 Formula Regional Oceania Championship is located in New Zealand
4	R3	Hampton Downs Motorsport Park (Hampton Downs, North Waikato)	5 February	New Zealand Grand Prix; Toyota Finance 86 Championship; New Zealand Formula First Championship; New Zealand Formula Ford Championship; GT New Zealand Championship; D1NZ National Drifting Championship; Central Muscle Cars; GT Racing New Zealand	2023 Formula Regional Oceania Championship is located in New Zealand
5	R1	Taupo Motorsport Park (Taupō, Waikato)	11 February	BMW Races Series; New Zealand Formula Ford Championship; New Zealand Formula First Championship; NZ V8 Utes; Mazda Racing NZ Championship	2023 Formula Regional Oceania Championship is located in New Zealand
5	R2	Taupo Motorsport Park (Taupō, Waikato)	12 February	BMW Races Series; New Zealand Formula Ford Championship; New Zealand Formula First Championship; NZ V8 Utes; Mazda Racing NZ Championship	2023 Formula Regional Oceania Championship is located in New Zealand
5	R3	Taupo Motorsport Park (Taupō, Waikato)	12 February	BMW Races Series; New Zealand Formula Ford Championship; New Zealand Formula First Championship; NZ V8 Utes; Mazda Racing NZ Championship	2023 Formula Regional Oceania Championship is located in New Zealand

== Results ==
Round		Circuit	Pole position	Fastest lap	Winning driver	Winning team
1	R1	Highlands Motorsport Park	(New Zealand) Callum Hedge	(New Zealand) Callum Hedge	(New Zealand) Callum Hedge	M2 Competition
1	R2	Highlands Motorsport Park		(New Zealand) James Penrose	(New Zealand) James Penrose	Kiwi Motorsport
1	R3	Highlands Motorsport Park	(New Zealand) Callum Hedge	(Austria) Charlie Wurz	(United States) David Morales	M2 Competition
2	R1	Teretonga Park Raceway	(New Zealand) Callum Hedge	(New Zealand) Callum Hedge	(Austria) Charlie Wurz	M2 Competition
2	R2	Teretonga Park Raceway		(New Zealand) Callum Hedge	(New Zealand) Callum Hedge	M2 Competition
2	R3	Teretonga Park Raceway	(Austria) Charlie Wurz	(United Kingdom) Josh Mason	(Austria) Charlie Wurz	M2 Competition
3	R1	Manfeild: Circuit Chris Amon	(Austria) Charlie Wurz	(United Kingdom) Louis Foster	(United Kingdom) Louis Foster	Giles Motorsport
3	R2	Manfeild: Circuit Chris Amon		(United Kingdom) Louis Foster	(United Kingdom) Josh Mason	Kiwi Motorsport
3	R3	Manfeild: Circuit Chris Amon	(Austria) Charlie Wurz	(United Kingdom) Louis Foster	(New Zealand) James Penrose	Kiwi Motorsport
4	R1	Hampton Downs Motorsport Park	(Netherlands) Laurens van Hoepen	(New Zealand) Kaleb Ngatoa	(New Zealand) Kaleb Ngatoa	Giles Motorsport
4	R2	Hampton Downs Motorsport Park		(United Kingdom) Louis Foster	(Austria) Charlie Wurz	M2 Competition
4	R3	Hampton Downs Motorsport Park	(Netherlands) Laurens van Hoepen	(Netherlands) Laurens van Hoepen	(Netherlands) Laurens van Hoepen	M2 Competition
5	R1	Taupo International Motorsport Park	(New Zealand) Callum Hedge	(New Zealand) Liam Sceats	(New Zealand) Callum Hedge	M2 Competition
5	R2	Taupo International Motorsport Park		(United States) Chloe Chambers	(United States) Chloe Chambers	Giles Motorsport
5	R3	Taupo International Motorsport Park	(Austria) Charlie Wurz	(United States) David Morales	(Austria) Charlie Wurz	M2 Competition

== Season report ==
=== First half ===
The first weekend of the freshly rebranded Formula Regional Oceania Championship was held at Highlands Motorsport Park. Callum Hedge claimed pole for the first race and kept the lead at the race start, as Charlie Wurz rose from fourth to second behind him. Hedge kept Wurz at bay for the whole race, just as Wurz did with David Morales behind him. A safety car was then called when Ryan Shehan crashed out, and the race finished under caution. The reversed-grid race two saw James Penrose dominate the race in similar fashion, putting on a lights-to-flag display undeterred by a safety car intervention for a retiring Liam Sceats. Behind Penrose, Jacob Abel took second from Ryder Quinn at the start. Wurz was next to get past Quinn, setting off after Abel, before a failed move for second place by Wurz put Quinn back on the podium. Hedge was on pole again for the third race, but this time it was Morales alongside him who got straight past him at the start. The pair pulled away from the field as they fought for victory, before Hedge had to pit for damage. This promoted Wurz to second, with Sceats coming home third. Two second places in the big points-paying races meant Wurz left Otago as the points leader, albeit only two points ahead of Morales.

One week later, Teretonga Park saw the same driver top the first qualifying session. Again it was the driver in second, this time Wurz, who had the better start and claimed the lead. Hedge followed Wurz all race, but was unable to muster an attack, so Wurz claimed his first Formula Regional win. Third was Abel, over fifteen seconds behind the pair. Race two was held on a damp track, and Quinn overtook polesitter Shehan for the lead at the start. The leading pair swapped back around later on, before heavy rain began to fall. In these conditions, Hedge was the class of the field, rising from seventh to the lead in just one lap to take a sudden and unexpected win. Wurz claimed pole for the final race of the weekend and never looked back to claim a lights-to-flag victory. Behind him, Hedge was never close enough to threaten Wurz's lead, but also never under attack from Sceats in third. Wurz's two wins grew his championship advantage to 25 points. Hedge's two second places and reversed-grid win promoted him to second in the standings, with Abel now in third.

The grid grew to 16 cars for the third round at Manfeild. One of the new arrivals, reigning Indy Pro 2000 champion Louis Foster, made his mark straightaway: He qualified second, kept behind polesitter Wurz at the start of a wet first race, used a safety car restart to get past Wurz into the lead and won the race. Championship protagonists Wurz and Hedge had no choice but to fight over second behind him. Wurz initially won that battle, before a penalty dropped him to fifth and promoted Sceats to the podium. Foster was then once again the fastest car on track for the second race, starting seventh and quickly climbing up the grid. Only Josh Mason, who had started second and passed poleman Shehan right at the start, was able to keep Foster behind and hold on to win. The front row for the third race was the same as in race one, with Wurz again able to hold Foster off at the start. This would all be for nothing, however, when Foster crashed into Wurz in lap 19, spinning Wurz around and getting himself stuck in the runoff area. Penrose inherited the lead and held Hedge and Sceats at bay to win. The stricken Wurz came home sixth, now only six points ahead of Hedge in the standings.

=== Second half ===
20 cars took part in the New Zealand Grand Prix weekend in Hampton Downs. The front row of race one was shared by debutant Laurens van Hoepen and returnee Kaleb Ngatoa, with the former on pole, but the latter ahead by turn one. Ngatoa comfortably led the field until a slight mistake on the final lap almost allowed van Hoepen back through, but Ngatoa was able to hold on to win the race. Hedge had an uneventful race to come home third in race one, but was hit by an electrical issue on the formation lap of race two. Wurz won that race from pole after holding off Abel at the start and resisting multiple attacks by the American all throughout the race. Brendon Leitch and Chris van der Drift had a similar scrap over third, but a chasing van Hoepen overtook both of them to take another podium. The Dutchman then started from pole for the Grand Prix, but was initially overtaken by Foster. Van Hoepen was able to regain the lead later on lap one and began to gradually pull away from his opposition. Foster reduced his lead in the closing stages of the race, but van Hoepen held on to win the New Zealand Grand Prix. Hedge was able to keep van der Drift and Ngatoa behind him to come third. The championship lead had changed hands between Wurz and Hedge two times that weekend, with Wurz now ten points ahead.

The season finale was held at Taupō. Hedge made short work of Wurz's slim points lead: He picked up pole for race one, kept calm during a disrupted race red-flagged for a three-car crash and held Foster behind him to win. Van Hoepen completed the podium, and Wurz in fifth was now three points behind Hedge. The reversed-grid race two saw Chloe Chambers lead the field lights-to-flag to become the first female driver to win in the history of New Zealand's premier open-wheel motorsport category. Ngatoa was the only one close to Chambers, with the rest of the field ten seconds back. Crucially, Wurz was in third and Hedge could only manage sixth, so the championship advantage was back in Wurz's favour by four points. In a winner-takes-all final race, Wurz started from pole position. Alongside him, Sceats made a mistake off the line, so Wurz was unchallenged during the opening lap. Van Hoepen inherited second place, with Ngatoa and Hedge behind them. This order stood until Adam Fitzgerald and Quinn crashed and caused a safety car. Making the most out of the restart was Penrose, moving into third place. Further ahead, Wurz held on to win the race and the championship, as Hedge only managed to come home fourth.

After two years of uncertainty and cancellations, the category made a strong restart in 2023. While Wurz and Hedge showed good, consistent pace all throughout the season, the championship would clearly have looked very different if van Hoepen and Foster had contested the entire season. Both came to New Zealand with little preparation, but were often faster than the two main championship protagonists. Foster took four podiums in nine races, and van Hoepen only finished off the podium once in his six starts. Still, Wurz and Hedge had to beat each other, often facing off directly against one another and delivering a close, unpredictable championship fight until the last race.

== Championship standings ==
=== Scoring system ===
Race (starting grid from qualifying)

Position	1st	2nd	3rd	4th	5th	6th	7th	8th	9th	10th	11th	12th	13th	14th	15th	16th	17th	18th	19th	20th
Points	35	31	27	24	22	20	18	16	14	12	10	9	8	7	6	5	4	3	2	1

Reversed grid race

Position	1st	2nd	3rd	4th	5th	6th	7th	8th	9th	10th	11th	12th	13th	14th	15th
Points	20	18	16	14	12	10	9	8	7	6	5	4	3	2	1

=== Drivers' championship ===
Pos.	Driver	HIG			TER			MAN			HMP			TAU			Points
Pos.	Driver	R1	R2	R3	R1	R2	R3	R1	R2	R3	R1	R2	R3	R1	R2	R3	Points
1	(Austria) Charlie Wurz	2	4	2	1	4	**1**	**5**	6	**6**	8	1	7	5	3	**1**	343
2	(New Zealand) Callum Hedge	**1**	6	**13**	**2**	1	2	2	7	2	3	18	3	**1**	6	4	329
3	(United States) Jacob Abel	6	2	6	3	6	5	3	4	4	7	2	8	Ret	9	6	265
4	(New Zealand) Liam Sceats	5	Ret	3	6	5	3	Ret	8	3	11	7	6	4	5	5	245
5	(New Zealand) James Penrose	8	1	8	5	7	12	6	5	1	15	11	13	Ret	10	3	214
6	(United States) David Morales	3	5	1	9	Ret	Ret	4	9	5	10	10	9	14	13	10	200
7	(Australia) Ryder Quinn	7	3	4	7	3	7	13	13	7	9	17	10	9	8	13	199
8	(United Kingdom) Josh Mason	4	9	11	4	8	4	7	1	Ret	13	9	12	7	15	16	186
9	(United States) Chloe Chambers	9	7	5	10	9	8	9	14	9	16	14	17	8	1	8	176
10	(United States) Ryan Shehan	Ret	8	7	8	2	6	8	3	10	12	12	11	10	16	11	173
11	(Netherlands) Laurens van Hoepen										**2**	3	**1**	3	4	2	154
12	(United Kingdom) Louis Foster							1	2	13	Ret	8	2	2	7	15	147
13	(Australia) Tom McLennan	11	10	9	11	12	9	10	10	11	WD	WD	WD	12	12	7	117
14	(New Zealand) Kaleb Ngatoa										1	13	5	6	2	9	115
15	(Brazil) Lucas Fecury	10	11	10	12	10	10	12	15	14	18	15	19	13	17	14	97
16	(New Zealand) Breanna Morris	12	12	12	13	11	11	11	16	12	17	16	18	Ret	14	12	85
17	(Republic of Ireland) Adam Fitzgerald							Ret	12	8	4	6	16	11	11	17	81
18	(New Zealand) Brendon Leitch										6	4	14				44
19	(New Zealand) Billy Frazer							14	11	15	14	Ret	15				33
guest drivers ineligible to score points
—	(New Zealand) Chris van der Drift										5	5	4				—
Pos.	Driver	R1	R2	R3	R1	R2	R3	R1	R2	R3	R1	R2	R3	R1	R2	R3	Points
Pos.	Driver	HIG			TER			MAN			HMP			TAU			Points

Colour	Result
Gold	Winner
Silver	Second place
Bronze	Third place
Green	Points classification
Blue	Non-points classification
Blue	Non-classified finish (NC)
Purple	Retired, not classified (Ret)
Red	Did not qualify (DNQ)
Red	Did not pre-qualify (DNPQ)
Black	Disqualified (DSQ)
White	Did not start (DNS)
White	Withdrew (WD)
White	Race cancelled (C)
Blank	Did not practice (DNP)
Blank	Did not arrive (DNA)
Blank	Excluded (EX)

**Bold** – Pole

Italics – Fastest Lap

† — Did not finish, but classified

Rookie
