= 2020 New Zealand Grand Prix =

- Race 3, Round 5 of 5 of the 2020 Toyota Racing Series

Race details
- Date: 16 February 2020
- Official name: LXV New Zealand Grand Prix
- Location: Manfeild: Circuit Chris Amon, Feilding, New Zealand
- Course: Permanent racing facility
- Course length: 3.033 km (1.885 miles)
- Distance: 35 laps, 106.155 km (65.975 miles)
- Weather: Fine

Pole position
Driver	(Brazil) Igor Fraga	M2 Competition
- Time: 1:02.706

Fastest lap
Driver	(Argentina) Franco Colapinto	Kiwi Motorsport
- Time: 1:03.737 on lap 27

Podium
First	(Brazil) Igor Fraga	M2 Competition
Second	(Argentina) Franco Colapinto	Kiwi Motorsport
Third	(New Zealand) Liam Lawson	M2 Competition

The 2020 New Zealand Grand Prix event for open wheel racing cars was held at Manfeild: Circuit Chris Amon near Feilding on 16 February 2020. It was the sixty-fifth New Zealand Grand Prix and fielded Toyota Racing Series cars. The event also served as the third race of the fifth round of the 2020 Toyota Racing Series, the final race of the series. The race was won by Igor Fraga, who also won the Toyota Racing Series championship in the process.

== Report ==
=== Qualifying ===
Pos	No	Driver	Team	Time	Grid
1	17	(Brazil) Igor Fraga	M2 Competition	1:02.706	1
2	23	(Brazil) Caio Collet	mtec Motorsport w/ R-ace GP	1:02.710	2
3	1	(New Zealand) Liam Lawson	M2 Competition	1:02.724	3
4	43	(Argentina) Franco Colapinto	Kiwi Motorsport	1:02.752	4
5	5	(United States) Spike Kohlbecker	Kiwi Motorsport	1:02.768	5
6	9	(Czech Republic) Petr Ptáček	mtec Motorsport w/ R-ace GP	1:02.900	6
7	6	(Israel) Ido Cohen	M2 Competition	1:02.953	7
8	88	(Sweden) Lucas Petersson	mtec Motorsport w/ R-ace GP	1:02.962	8
9	33	(Japan) Yuki Tsunoda	M2 Competition	1:02.965	15^{1}
10	11	(Australia) Jackson Walls	mtec Motorsport w/ R-ace GP	1:02.984	9
11	26	(Switzerland) Grégoire Saucy	Giles Motorsport	1:03.030	10
12	10	(Denmark) Oliver Rasmussen	mtec Motorsport w/ R-ace GP	1:03.141	11
13	44	(Germany) Lirim Zendeli	Giles Motorsport	1:03.238	12
14	4	(Sweden) Henning Enqvist	Giles Motorsport	1:03.300	13
15	13	(Netherlands) Tijmen van der Helm	Kiwi Motorsport	1:03.317	14
16	21	(France) Émilien Denner	M2 Competition	1:03.363	16
17	7	(Switzerland) Axel Gnos	Kiwi Motorsport	1:03.430	17
18	99	(Angola) Rui Andrade	M2 Competition	1:03.452	18
-	49	(New Zealand) Ken Smith	Giles Motorsport	No Time	PL

Notes

1. – Tsunoda was given a six-place penalty for a practice start infringement.

=== Race ===
Pos	No	Driver	Team	Laps	Time / Retired	Grid
1	17	(Brazil) Igor Fraga	M2 Competition	35	43min 38.279sec	1
2	43	(Argentina) Franco Colapinto	Kiwi Motorsport	35	+ 1.724 s	4
3	1	(New Zealand) Liam Lawson	M2 Competition	35	+ 3.387 s	3
4	23	(Brazil) Caio Collet	mtec Motorsport w/ R-ace GP	35	+ 3.737 s	2
5	9	(Czech Republic) Petr Ptáček	mtec Motorsport w/ R-ace GP	35	+ 6.932 s	6
6	33	(Japan) Yuki Tsunoda	M2 Competition	35	+ 8.463 s	15
7	5	(United States) Spike Kohlbecker	Kiwi Motorsport	35	+ 9.549 s	5
8	11	(Australia) Jackson Walls	mtec Motorsport w/ R-ace GP	35	+ 13.087 s	10
9	26	(Switzerland) Grégoire Saucy	Giles Motorsport	35	+ 13.594 s	11
10	88	(Sweden) Lucas Petersson	mtec Motorsport w/ R-ace GP	35	+ 14.089 s	8
11	6	(Israel) Ido Cohen	M2 Competition	35	+ 14.623 s	7
12	10	(Denmark) Oliver Rasmussen	mtec Motorsport w/ R-ace GP	35	+ 15.856 s	12
13	44	(Germany) Lirim Zendeli	Giles Motorsport	35	+ 16.076 s	13
14	7	(Switzerland) Axel Gnos	Kiwi Motorsport	35	+ 18.171 s	17
15	49	(New Zealand) Ken Smith	Giles Motorsport	35	+ 25.584 s	PL
Ret	13	(Netherlands) Tijmen van der Helm	Kiwi Motorsport	16	Spun off	15
Ret	21	(France) Émilien Denner	M2 Competition	12	Spun off	16
Ret	99	(Angola) Rui Andrade	M2 Competition	8	Retired	18
Ret	4	(Sweden) Henning Enqvist	Giles Motorsport	1	Spun off	14

Preceded by 2020 Pukekohe TRS round	Toyota Racing Series; 2020	Succeeded by end of season
Preceded by 2019 New Zealand Grand Prix	New Zealand Grand Prix; 2020	Succeeded by 2021 New Zealand Grand Prix
