= Kaleb Ngatoa =

New Zealand motor racing driver (born 2001)

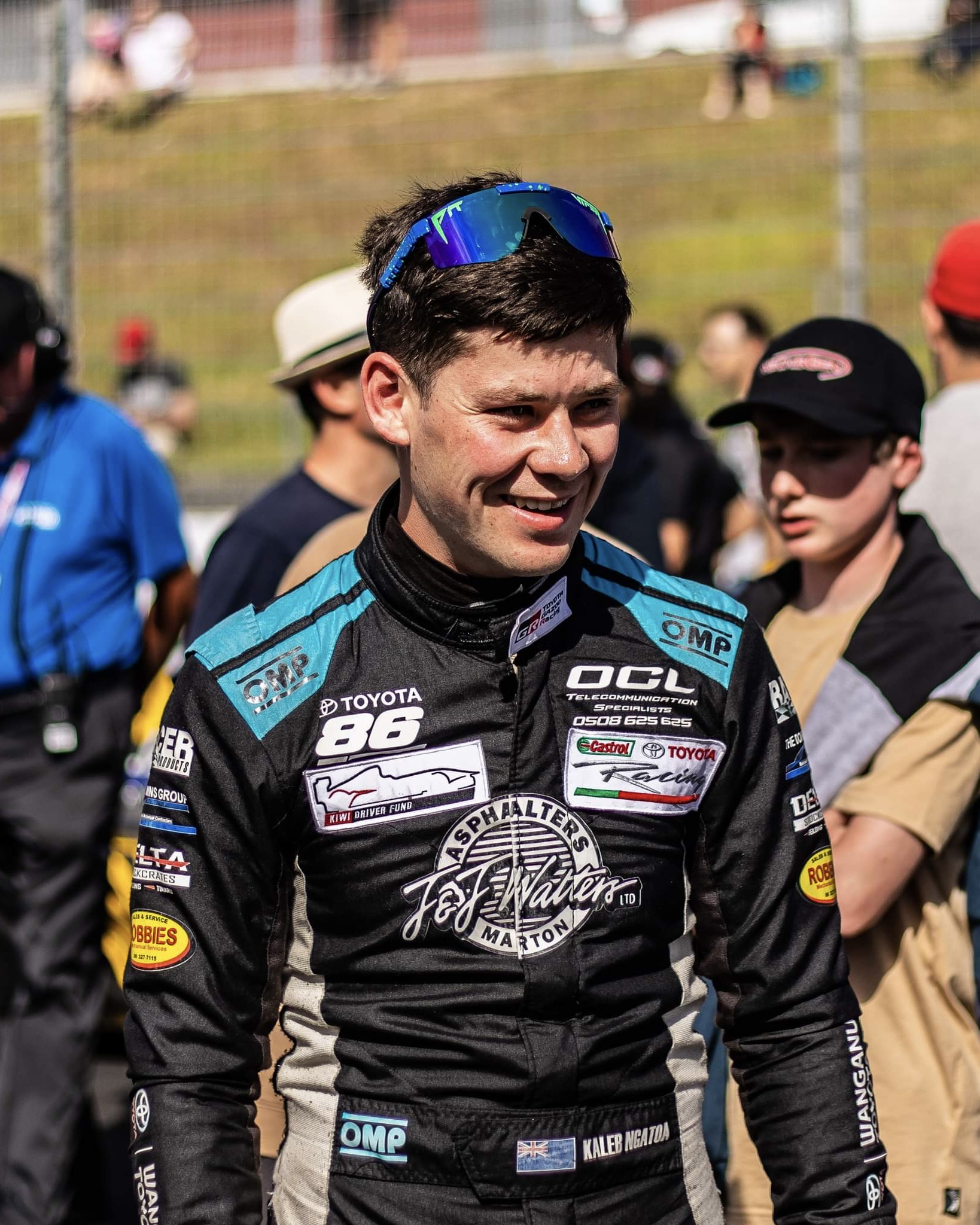
- Kaleb Ngatoa moments before the 66th New Zealand Grand Prix
- Nationality: (New Zealand) New Zealander
- Born: 11 May 2001 (age 25) Marton, New Zealand

S5000 Australian Drivers Championship career
- Debut season: 2021
- Current team: Team BRM
- Categorisation: FIA Silver
- Car number: 15
- Starts: 11
- Wins: 2
- Poles: 0
- Fastest laps: 1
- Best finish: 1st in 2021

Previous series
- 2021 2019-2020 2018-19 2017-18: Toyota Racing Series; New Zealand Formula Ford Championship; Toyota Finance 86 Championship; New Zealand Formula First Championship

Kaleb Ngatoa (born 11 May 2001), is a New Zealand Māori motor racing driver.

== Career ==
Before his switch to car racing, Ngatoa was one of the country's most successful karting talents. He started karting in 2011 and immediately shot to prominence by winning the cadet class of the NZ CIK Trophy. Two seasons later he was on the top step of the championship podium again winning the 100cc Junior Restricted Class of the Kartsport NZ North Island Sprint Championship. 2015 saw him claim the Kartsport NZ North Island Sprint Championship in the Rotax Junior class. 2016 followed where he won the Giltrap Group Kartsport NZ Sprint Championship in the Junior Rotax class and demonstrated a seamless transition to circuit racing in the same year by winning the Formula First winter series run at Circuit Chris Amon, Manfeild.

Ngatoa would enter his first car racing national championship racing in the New Zealand Formula First Championship in 2017. Ngatoa finished runner-up to Callum Crawley in a tight championship fight decided in the final round. The following year, he would contend the Toyota Finance 86 Championship, with modest results, picking up a race win at the final round at Hampton Downs Motorsport Park. Following a challenging Toyota Finance 86 Championship campaign filled with multiple mechanical issues, Ngatoa moved into the highly competitive New Zealand Formula Ford Championship for the 2019/20 season. Ngatoa again struggled with car reliability and mechanical issues, though picked up top 5 and podium results.

Following the New Zealand Formula Ford Championship, Ngatoa would contend the Toyota Racing Series for the 2021 season. The series proved as a stomping ground for the Marton teen, picking up three podiums in nine races. Ngatoa's main season highlight would prove to be his masterful pole position for the 2021 New Zealand Grand Prix in the wet, against the likes of Shane van Gisbergen and Chris van der Drift. Ngatoa would go on to claim second in the championship behind Matthew Payne. Following this, Ngatoa secured a drive in the S5000 Australian Drivers Championship for the remaining three rounds in 2021.

== Racing record ==
=== Karting career summary ===
Season	Series	Position
2010	CIK Trophy of New Zealand - Cadet	4th
2010	Kartsport New Zealand National Sprint Championship - Cadet	19th
2011	CIK Trophy of New Zealand - Cadet	**1st**
2011	Kartsport New Zealand National Schools Championship - Cadet	4th
2011	Kartsport New Zealand National Sprint Championship - Cadet	14th
2011	43rd Blossom Festival - Cadet	14th
2012	CIK Trophy of New Zealand - Cadet	**2nd**
2012	Kartsport New Zealand National Schools Championship - Cadet	**2nd**
2012	Kartsport New Zealand National Sprint Championship - Cadet	19th
2012	Kartsport New Zealand North Island Sprint Championship - Junior Restricted	4th
2013	New Zealand Top Half Series - Junior Restricted	12th
2013	Kartsport New Zealand North Island Championship - Junior Restricted	**1st**
2013	Kartsport New Zealand National Sprint Championship - Junior Restricted	**2nd**
2014	Kartsport New Zealand National Schools Championship - 100cc Junior Yamaha	6th
2014	Kartsport New Zealand North Island Sprint Championship - Rotex Max Junior	9th
2014	46th Blossom Festival - Rotex Max Junior	**2nd**
2014	Kartsport New Zealand National Schools Championship - Formula Junior	7th
2014	Kartsport New Zealand National Schools Championship - Junior Rotax	11th
2015	Kartsport New Zealand National Sprint Championship - Rotex Max Junior	4th
2015	Kartsport New Zealand North Island Sprint Championship - Rotex Max Junior	**1st**
2015	Kartsport New Zealand National Sprint Championship - 100cc Junior Yamaha	4th
2016	Kartsport New Zealand National Sprint Championship - Rotex Max Junior	**1st**
2016	Rotax Max Challenge New Zealand National Sprint Championship - Junior	17th
2016	Kartsport New Zealand National Schools Championship - Formula Junior	**1st**
2016	Kartsport New Zealand National Schools Championship - 100cc Junior Yamaha	8th
2017	Kartsport New Zealand National Schools Championship - Rotex Light	**2nd**
2022	Kartsport Auckland City of Sails - Vortex Rok DVS Senior	**2nd**
2022	CIK Trophy of New Zealand - Vortex Rok DVS Senior	9th

=== Career summary ===
Season	Series	Team	Races	Wins	Poles	F. Laps	Podiums	Points	Position
2016	Formula First Manfeild Winter Series	Kaleb Ngatoa Motorsport	12	1	2	3	9	712	**1st**
2016-17	New Zealand Formula First Championship	Kaleb Ngatoa Motorsport	24	0	0	1	1	956	7th
2017	Formula First Manfeild Winter Series	Kaleb Ngatoa Motorsport	3	0	0	0	3	194	10th
2017-18	New Zealand Formula First Championship	Kaleb Ngatoa Motorsport	24	6	1	1	15	1381	**2nd**
2018-19	Toyota Finance 86 Championship	Kaleb Ngatoa Motorsport	18	1	0	2	4	781	7th
2019	New Zealand Formula First 1 Hour	Thomas Boniface Racing	1	1	0	0	0	N/A	**1st**
2019	Formula Ford Manfeild Winter Series	Kaleb Ngatoa Motorsport	6	1	0	2	2	336	5th
2019-20	New Zealand Formula Ford Championship	Kaleb Ngatoa Motorsport	13	0	0	0	3	511	7th
2020	Formula Ford Manfeild Winter Series	Kaleb Ngatoa Motorsport	5	0	0	0	3	288	6th
2021	Toyota Racing Series	M2 Competition	9	0	1	0	3	229	**2nd**
2021	S5000 Australian Drivers Championship	Team BRM	9	2	0	1	3	161	9th
2021	Formula Regional Americas Championship	Kiwi Motorsport	3	0	0	0	0	24	17th
2022	S5000 Australian Drivers Championship	Team BRM	12	1	0	0	1	177	8th
2022	Aussie Racing Car Series	Local Legends Racing	4	0	0	0	0	33	35th
2023	Formula Regional Oceania Championship	Giles Motorsport	6	1	0	1	2	115	14th
2023	Formula Regional Japanese Championship	Sutekina Racing Team	2	0	0	0	0	6	24th
2023	S5000 Australian Drivers' Championship	88Racing	3	0	0	0	0	40	18th
2023	S5000 Tasman Series	88Racing	3	0	0	0	0	40	9th
2024	Formula Regional Oceania Championship	Giles Motorsport	12	1	0	1	2	205	6th
2024	Tasman Series	Giles Motorsport	6	0	0	0	1	108	**3rd**

^{*} Season still in progress.

=== Complete New Zealand Grand Prix results ===
Year	Team	Car	Qualifying	Main race
2021	(New Zealand) M2 Competition	Tatuus FT-60 - Toyota	**1st**	4th
2023	(New Zealand) Giles Motorsport	Tatuus FT-60 - Toyota	3rd	5th
2024	(New Zealand) Giles Motorsport	Tatuus FT-60 - Toyota	7th	WD

=== Complete S5000 results ===
Year	Series	Team	1	2	3	4	5	6	7	8	9	10	11	12	13	14	15	Position	Points
2021	Australian	Team BRM	SYM; R1	SYM; R2	SYM; R3	PHI; R4; 10	PHI; R5; Ret	PHI; R6; 8	SAN; R7; 3	SAN; R8; 1	SAN; R9; DNS	SMP; R10; 7	SMP; R11; 1	SMP; R12; 7				9th	161
2022	Australian	Team BRM	SYM; R1; 9	SYM; R2; 5	SYM; R3; 7	PHI; R4; 8	PHI; R5; 7	PHI; R6; 6	MEL; R7; 7	MEL; R8; 4	MEL; R9; 10	SMP; R10	SMP; R11	SMP; R12	HID; R13; 8	HID; R14; 1	HID; R15; Ret	8th	177
2023	Tasman	88Racing	ADL; R16; 5	ADL; R17; 5	ADL; R18; Ret													9th	40

^{*} Season still in progress.

=== Complete Formula Regional Oceania Championship results ===
(key) (Races in bold indicate pole position) (Races in italics indicate fastest lap)

Year	Team	1	2	3	4	5	6	7	8	9	10	11	12	13	14	15	DC	Points
2023	Giles Motorsport	HIG; 1	HIG; 2	HIG; 3	TER; 1	TER; 2	TER; 3	MAN; 1	MAN; 2	MAN; 3	HMP; 1; 1	HMP; 2; 13	HMP; 3; 5	TAU; 1; 6	TAU; 2; 2	TAU; 3; 9	14th	115
2024	Giles Motorsport	TAU; 1; 4	TAU; 2; 14	TAU; 3; 7	MAN; 1; 4	MAN; 2; 2	MAN; 3; 5	HMP; 1; 16	HMP; 2; 7	HMP; 3; 1	RUA; 1; 4	RUA; 2; 5	RUA; 3; 10	HIG; 1 WD	HIG; 2 WD	HIG; 3 WD	6th	205

=== Complete Formula Regional Japanese Championship results ===
(key) (Races in bold indicate pole position) (Races in italics indicate fastest lap)

Year	Entrant	1	2	3	4	5	6	7	8	9	10	11	12	13	14	15	16	Pos	Points
2023	Sutekina Racing Team	FUJ1; 1	FUJ1; 2	FUJ1; 3	SUZ; 1; 4	SUZ; 2 Ret	OKA; 1	OKA; 2	OKA; 3	MOT; 1	MOT; 2	MOT; 3	FUJ2; 1	FUJ2; 2	SUG; 1	SUG; 2	SUG; 3	24th	6
