= 2021 Toyota Racing Series =

Motor racing competition

The 2021 Castrol Toyota Racing Series was the seventeenth running of the Toyota Racing Series, the premier open-wheel motorsport category held in New Zealand. The series consisted of nine races at three meetings. It began on 24 January at Hampton Downs, in Waikato, and concluded on 14 February at Manfeild, Feilding. The season opener also hosted the 66th running of the New Zealand Grand Prix. The 2021 Toyota Racing Series was the first season in which no individual race teams were running and all drivers were under a Toyota Racing banner. This was due to the COVID situation.

== Teams and drivers ==
Team	No.	Driver	Rounds
M2 Competition	3	(New Zealand) Chris Vlok	All
M2 Competition	7	(New Zealand) Matt Payne	All
M2 Competition	14	(New Zealand) Billy Frazer	All
M2 Competition	15	(New Zealand) Kaleb Ngatoa	All
M2 Competition	32	(New Zealand) Josh Bethune	1
M2 Competition	97	(New Zealand) Shane van Gisbergen	1
TGR NZ	11	(New Zealand) Conrad Clark	All
Giles Motorsport	22	(New Zealand) Tom Alexander	1–2
Giles Motorsport	24	(New Zealand) Andre Heimgartner	1
Giles Motorsport	50	(New Zealand) Ken Smith	1
Giles Motorsport	84	(New Zealand) Peter Vodanovich	All
Tasman Motorsports	27	(New Zealand) Daniel Gaunt	1
Tasman Motorsports	31	(New Zealand) Chris van der Drift	1
Kiwi Motorsport	51	(New Zealand) Greg Murphy	1
Kiwi Motorsport	86	(New Zealand) Brendon Leitch	1
Kiwi Motorsport	87	(New Zealand) Damon Leitch	1

== Changes ==
=== Sporting ===
To compensate for the shortened calendar, the race distances were increased, from 50 and 70 kilometers to 70 and 80 kilometers respectively.

== Race calendar ==
The 2021 calendar was announced on 17 November 2020. Heavy border restrictions in New Zealand because of the COVID-19 pandemic resulted in a shortened calendar compared to traditional seasons, with only three race weekends at two circuits, limited to the North Island.

Round		Circuit	Date	Pole position	Fastest lap	Race winner
1	R1	Hampton Downs Motorsport Park (Hampton Downs, North Waikato)	23 January	(New Zealand) Chris van der Drift	(New Zealand) Shane van Gisbergen	(New Zealand) Shane van Gisbergen
1	R2	Hampton Downs Motorsport Park (Hampton Downs, North Waikato)	24 January	(New Zealand) Shane van Gisbergen	(New Zealand) Shane van Gisbergen	(New Zealand) Shane van Gisbergen
1	R3	Hampton Downs Motorsport Park (Hampton Downs, North Waikato)	24 January	(New Zealand) Kaleb Ngatoa	(New Zealand) Shane van Gisbergen	(New Zealand) Shane van Gisbergen
2	R1	Hampton Downs Motorsport Park (Hampton Downs, North Waikato)	30 January	(New Zealand) Matthew Payne	(New Zealand) Peter Vodanovich	(New Zealand) Matthew Payne
2	R2	Hampton Downs Motorsport Park (Hampton Downs, North Waikato)	30 January	(New Zealand) Matthew Payne	(New Zealand) Matthew Payne	(New Zealand) Matthew Payne
3	R1	Manfeild: Circuit Chris Amon (Feilding, Manawatū District)	13 February	(New Zealand) Matthew Payne	(New Zealand) Matthew Payne	(New Zealand) Matthew Payne
3	R2	Manfeild: Circuit Chris Amon (Feilding, Manawatū District)	13 February	(New Zealand) Matthew Payne	(New Zealand) Matthew Payne	(New Zealand) Matthew Payne
3	R3	Manfeild: Circuit Chris Amon (Feilding, Manawatū District)	14 February	(New Zealand) Matthew Payne	(New Zealand) Matthew Payne	(New Zealand) Billy Frazer (Note: Matthew Payne finished first but received two five-second time penalties for separate infringements (lining up outside of grid box and safety car restart procedure).)
3	R4	Manfeild: Circuit Chris Amon (Feilding, Manawatū District)	14 February	(New Zealand) Matthew Payne	(New Zealand) Matthew Payne	(New Zealand) Matthew Payne

== Championship standings ==
=== Drivers' championship ===
Pos.	Driver	HD1			HD2		MAN				Points
1	(New Zealand) Matthew Payne	3	3	3	**1**	**1**	**1**	**1**	**2**	**1**	287
2	(New Zealand) Kaleb Ngatoa	5	4	**4**	4	2	2	3	4	5	229
3	(New Zealand) Billy Frazer	10	9	8	3	6	4	5	1	2	201
4	(New Zealand) Conrad Clark	12	6	10	6	5	3	4	5	3	183
5	(New Zealand) Peter Vodanovich	9	7	Ret	2	DSQ	5	2	3	4	167
6	(New Zealand) Chris Vlok	14	10	13	7	4	6	6	6	6	149
7	(New Zealand) Shane van Gisbergen	1	**1**	1							105
8	(New Zealand) Tom Alexander	8	Ret	11	5	3					75
9	(New Zealand) Chris van der Drift	**2**	2	12							71
10	(New Zealand) Damon Leitch	11	5	5							54
11	(New Zealand) Andre Heimgartner	6	Ret	2							51
12	(New Zealand) Brendon Leitch	4	Ret	6							44
13	(New Zealand) Daniel Gaunt	7	Ret	7							36
14	(New Zealand) Josh Bethune	Ret	8	14							23
15	(New Zealand) Greg Murphy	13	Ret	9							22
16	(New Zealand) Ken Smith	15	Ret	15							12
Pos.	Driver	HD1			HD2		MAN				Points

Colour	Result
Gold	Winner
Silver	Second place
Bronze	Third place
Green	Points classification
Blue	Non-points classification
Blue	Non-classified finish (NC)
Purple	Retired, not classified (Ret)
Red	Did not qualify (DNQ)
Red	Did not pre-qualify (DNPQ)
Black	Disqualified (DSQ)
White	Did not start (DNS)
White	Withdrew (WD)
White	Race cancelled (C)
Blank	Did not practice (DNP)
Blank	Did not arrive (DNA)
Blank	Excluded (EX)

**Bold** – Pole
Italics – Fastest Lap
