= Manfeild: Circuit Chris Amon =

Motorsport race track in New Zealand

- Full Circuit (Clockwise) (1990–present)

- Short Grand Prix Circuit (Clockwise) (1973–present)
- Location: Feilding, New Zealand
- Coordinates: 40°14′15″S 175°33′26″E
- FIA Grade: 3
- Opened: 1973
- Former names: Manfeild Autocourse (1973–2016)
- Major events: Current: GR86 Championship New Zealand (2014–2021, 2023–2024, 2026); Former: World SBK (1988–1990, 1992); FR Oceania (2005–2007, 2021, 2023–2025); New Zealand Grand Prix (1992–1995, 2008–2020); Super V8 Series (2003–2021, 2024); V8SuperTourer (2012)
- Website: https://www.manfeild.co.nz/motorsport.html

Full Circuit (1990–present)
- Length: 4.511 km (2.803 mi)
- Turns: 13

Short Grand Prix Circuit (1973–present)
- Length: 3.030 km (1.883 mi)
- Turns: 7
- Race lap record: 1:01.457 ( (New Zealand) Simon Wills, Reynard 94D, 2000, Formula Holden)

Manfeild: Circuit Chris Amon (formerly Manfeild Autocourse) is a motor sport circuit located in Feilding, New Zealand. It was built by the Manawatu Car Club in 1973 as a purpose-built course. In 1990 extra land was acquired and the circuit extension built, bringing Manfeild up to international standards. The circuit was renamed the Manfeild: Circuit Chris Amon, in honour of former New Zealand Formula One driver Chris Amon, on 25 November 2016.

== History ==
The original 3.030 km (1.883 mi) circuit was built by the Manawatu Car Club Incorporated with the first event being held in 1973. A purpose designed venue with an uninterrupted view of the action, the circuit has workshop garages, hospitality suites and toilet blocks and sealed access roads throughout the pit paddock area.

The name "Manfeild" was derived from "Manawatu" being the region the circuit is in and "Feilding" the town it is in.

In 1990 the Car Club began looking at wider issues of governance and development. Extra land acquired extended the track to full International standards, and also accommodates Agricultural/Pastoral Shows.

In October 2004 three land owners, Manawatu District Council, Feilding IA&P and the Manawatu Car Club deeded their land and formed the Manfeild Park Trust. 2022 board members are Hamish Waugh (chairman), Amanda Linsley, Stefan Speller, Stella Rackham and Kevin Hansen.

Manfeild Park now encompasses what is now known as the Manfeild Circuit Chris Amon and the developing land that was the Feilding Race Course.

Manfeild has held the New Zealand Grand Prix on seventeen occasions (1992–1995, 2008–2020).

== The circuit ==
The full circuit is 4.511 km (2.803 mi) with long three long straights and offers many passing opportunities and when in (rare) use is the longest race circuit in New Zealand. A quick lap around the circuit involves smooth entries and exits, maintaining good corner speed and maximising terminal speeds on the straights.

The main 3.030 km (1.883 mi) circuit is the only section used for competition car racing including the New Zealand Grand Prix. The Grand Prix is not held over the full circuit. The FIA track license is only for the main 3.030 km (1.883 mi) circuit in a clockwise direction only. However Motorcycle racing can be held in the anticlockwise direction if approved by the Steward on the day. Motorcycles can also use the full circuit, but it is not advised unless a protective airfence is bought in for the back straight wall.

The back 1.500 km (0.932 mi) circuit is used for club meetings and driver training.

== Layout configurations ==
Full Circuit (Clockwise)

Short Grand Prix Circuit (Clockwise)

Full Circuit (Anti-Clockwise)

== Lap records ==
The overall 3.030 km (1.883 mi) lap record has been updated to reflect the correct record for the Clockwise direction. While Earl Bamber does hold the TRS record on Manfeild, it is not the official overall record. Simon Wills took the record off Graeme Lawrence who set a 1.01.700 record in 1975 in a F5000 Lola T332 (Car#14 painting in Marlboro Colours). There is record of faster times around Manfeild, but not during a race. Kenny Smith is reputed to have completed a 0.58 lap in a F5000 set in the early seventies, but it was only a demo lap. Johnny Reid has also completed a sub minute lap in an A1GP car, but again only as a demonstration run and promotion for the series running in New Zealand at the time.

While Manfeild now only runs clockwise, there is also an anti-clockwise record held by Greg Murphy at 1.00.81 in a Formula Holden Reynard 92D set in 1995. As of February 2026, the fastest official race lap records at the Manfeild: Circuit Chris Amon are listed as:

Category	Time	Driver	Vehicle	Event	Date
Short Grand Prix Circuit (1973–present): 3.030 km (1.883 mi)
Formula Holden	1:01.457	Simon Wills	Reynard 94D	2000 Manfeild Formula Holden Tasman Cup round	26 November 2000
Formula 5000	1:01.700	Graeme Lawrence	Lola T332	1975 Manfeild New Zealand Gold Star round	14 December 1975
Toyota Racing Series	1:02.845	Brandon Maïsano	Tatuus FT-50	2015 New Zealand Grand Prix	15 February 2015
Daytona Prototype (GTRNZ)	1:02.849	John DeVeth	Crawford DP03	2019 Manfeild GTRNZ round	10 February 2019
Formula Regional	1:03.539	Matthew Payne	Tatuus FT-60	2021 Manfeild TRS round	14 February 2021
Superbike racing	1:04.736	Sloan Frost	Suzuki GSX-R1000	2019 Manfeild NZ SBK round	30 March 2019
World SBK	1:06.970	Doug Polen	Ducati 888 SBK	1992 Manfeild World SBK round	25 October 1992
TA2	1:10.035	Dylan Grant	Dodge Challenger Trans-Am	2026 Manfeild TA2 NZ round	28 February 2026
Toyota 86 Championship	1:17:279	Tom Alexander	Toyota 86	2015 Manfeild Toyota 86 Championship round	15 February 2015
