= 2012 New Zealand Grand Prix =

- Race 3, Round 5 of 5 of the 2012 Toyota Racing Series

Race details
- Date: 12 February 2012
- Official name: LVII New Zealand Grand Prix
- Location: Manfeild Autocourse, Feilding, New Zealand
- Course: Permanent racing facility
- Course length: 3.033 km (1.885 miles)
- Distance: 35 laps, 106.16 km (65.96 miles)
- Weather: Fine

Pole position
| Driver | (New Zealand) Mitch Evans | Giles Motorsport |
- Time: 1:03.392

Fastest lap
| Driver | (New Zealand) Mitch Evans | Giles Motorsport |
- Time: 1:04.235 on lap 22

Podium
| First | (New Zealand) Nick Cassidy | Giles Motorsport |
| Second | (Netherlands) Hannes van Asseldonk | Giles Motorsport |
| Third | (Austria) Lucas Auer | Giles Motorsport |

The 2012 New Zealand Grand Prix event for open wheel racing cars was held at Manfeild Autocourse near Feilding on 12 February 2012. It was the fifty-seventh New Zealand Grand Prix and was open to Toyota Racing Series cars. The event was also the third race of the fifth round of the 2012 Toyota Racing Series, the final race of the series.

Twenty Tatuus-Toyota cars started the race which was won by 17-year-old New Zealander Nick Cassidy who became the who became the second teenager in as many years to claim the Grand Prix after sixteen-year-old Mitch Evans the previous year.

The Giles Motorsport team dominated the race, filling all three podium positions. Dutch driver Hannes van Asseldonk finished second, 05 seconds behind Cassidy. Third was Austrian driver Lucas Auer. Cassidy inherited the lead after the retirement of fellow Giles Motorsport driver and defending champion Mitch Evans who held a three-second lead when his car failed on lap 28. Completing Giles Motorsport's dominance of the race, Brazilian driver Bruno Bonifacio finished fourth. Nathanaël Berthon was the first driver from any other team, finishing fifth for M2 Competition.

Cassidy's win also wrapped up a success championship campaign for Cassidy, winning his first major championship with the 2012 Toyota Racing Series crown.

== Results ==
=== Qualifying ===
| Pos | No | Driver | Team | Time | Grid |
|---|---|---|---|---|---|
| 1 | 1 | (New Zealand) Mitch Evans | Giles Motorsport | 1:03.178 | 1 |
| 2 | 2 | (New Zealand) Nick Cassidy | Giles Motorsport | 1:03.391 | 2 |
| 3 | 5 | (Brazil) Bruno Bonifacio | Giles Motorsport | 1:03.518 | 3 |
| 4 | 52 | (France) Nathanaël Berthon | M2 Competition | 1:03.711 | 4 |
| 5 | 16 | (Netherlands) Hannes van Asseldonk | Giles Motorsport | 1:03.791 | 5 |
| 6 | 15 | (Austria) Lucas Auer | Giles Motorsport | 1:03.817 | 6 |
| 7 | 10 | (United Kingdom) Josh Hill | ETEC Motorsport | 1:03.967 | 7 |
| 8 | 42 | (United Kingdom) Jordan King | M2 Competition | 1:03.980 | 8 |
| 9 | 87 | (New Zealand) Damon Leitch | Victory Motor Racing | 1:04.146 | 9 |
| 10 | 53 | (Italy) Raffaele Marciello | M2 Competition | 1:04.201 | 10 |
| 11 | 6 | (Puerto Rico) Félix Serrallés | Giles Motorsport | 1:04.285 | 11 |
| 12 | 43 | (Thailand) Tanart Sathienthirakul | M2 Competition | 1:04.353 | 12 |
| 13 | 7 | (New Zealand) Jono Lester | ETEC Motorsport | 1:04.403 | 13 |
| 14 | 4 | (New Zealand) Chris Vlok | Victory Motor Racing | 1:04.492 | 14 |
| 15 | 20 | (Russia) Dmitry Suranovich | Victory Motor Racing | 1:04.584 | 15 |
| 16 | 8 | (Malaysia) Melvin Moh | ETEC Motorsport | 1:04.729 | 16 |
| 17 | 88 | (Italy) Michela Cerruti | Victory Motor Racing | 1:04.809 | 17 |
| 18 | 11 | (India) Shahaan Engineer | ETEC Motorsport | 1:04.847 | 18 |
| 19 | 9 | (New Zealand) Ken Smith | ETEC Motorsport | 1:05.394 | 19 |
| 20 | 51 | (India) Sheban Siddiqi | M2 Competition | 1:05.950 | 20 |

=== Race ===
| Pos | No | Driver | Team | Laps | Gap | Grid |
|---|---|---|---|---|---|---|
| 1 | 2 | (New Zealand) Nick Cassidy | Giles Motorsport | 35 | 40min 18.327sec | 2 |
| 2 | 16 | (Netherlands) Hannes van Asseldonk | Giles Motorsport | 35 | + 0.509s | 5 |
| 3 | 15 | (Austria) Lucas Auer | Giles Motorsport | 35 | + 4.800s | 6 |
| 4 | 5 | (Brazil) Bruno Bonifacio | Giles Motorsport | 35 | + 7.772s | 3 |
| 5 | 52 | (France) Nathanaël Berthon | M2 Competition | 35 | + 8.363s | 4 |
| 6 | 7 | (New Zealand) Jono Lester | ETEC Motorsport | 35 | + 11.723s | 13 |
| 7 | 6 | (Puerto Rico) Félix Serrallés | Giles Motorsport | 35 | + 12.294s | 11 |
| 8 | 20 | (Russia) Dmitry Suranovich | Victory Motor Racing | 35 | + 18.280s | 15 |
| 9 | 8 | (Malaysia) Melvin Moh | ETEC Motorsport | 35 | + 24.164s | 16 |
| 10 | 43 | (Thailand) Tanart Sathienthirakul | M2 Competition | 35 | + 28.179s | 12 |
| 11 | 4 | (New Zealand) Chris Vlok | Victory Motor Racing | 35 | + 28.265s | 14 |
| 12 | 88 | (Italy) Michela Cerruti | Victory Motor Racing | 35 | + 28.683s | 17 |
| 13 | 9 | (New Zealand) Ken Smith | ETEC Motorsport | 35 | + 39.874s | 19 |
| 14 | 51 | (India) Sheban Siddiqi | M2 Competition | 35 | + 1:01.730s | 20 |
| 15 | 11 | (India) Shahaan Engineer | ETEC Motorsport | 34 | + 1 lap | 18 |
| 16 | 87 | (New Zealand) Damon Leitch | Victory Motor Racing | 30 | + 5 laps | 9 |
| Ret | 1 | (New Zealand) Mitch Evans | Giles Motorsport | 28 | Engine | 1 |
| Ret | 10 | (United Kingdom) Josh Hill | ETEC Motorsport | 17 | Retired | 7 |
| Ret | 53 | (Italy) Raffaele Marciello | M2 Competition | 15 | Retired | 10 |
| Ret | 42 | (United Kingdom) Jordan King | M2 Competition | 4 | Retired | 8 |

| Preceded by 2011 New Zealand Grand Prix | New Zealand Grand Prix; 2012 | Succeeded by 2013 New Zealand Grand Prix |
