= 2011 Toyota Racing Series =

Motor racing competition

Seasons
- ← 2010 2012 →

The 2011 Toyota Racing Series was the seventh running of the Toyota Racing Series. The Toyota Racing Series is New Zealand's premier open-wheeler motorsport category.

Defending champion Mitch Evans of Giles Motorsport retained both his International Trophy and main series titles, joining Daniel Gaunt as the only drivers to have won the Series on more than one occasion, after enjoying a successful championship campaign. Evans took seven race victories – including becoming the youngest-ever winner of the New Zealand Grand Prix – and fourteen podium finishes out of a possible fifteen races. Evans clinched both championship titles at Manfield after his closest rival at the time, Scott Pye elected not to attend the final meeting of the season at Taupō due to testing commitments in Europe. Pye fell to fourth in the championship standings after strong weekends for Nick Cassidy and Jamie McNee allowed them to overhaul Pye's points tally.

Cassidy, another Giles Motorsport driver, finished as top rookie after taking the round victory at Taupō which included his first two race wins in the Series, and he also took five further podium finishes as he finished 168 points behind Evans. McNee, in his second season in the championship, took his first race victories, winning at Timaru and Hampton Downs as well as a second place at Taupō to finish 47 points clear of Pye. Russian driver Daniil Kvyat finished the best of the five European drivers in the series, finishing in fifth place for Victory Motor Racing with a solitary victory at Manfeild. Two other drivers won races during the season, Russia's Ivan Lukashevich, like fellow countryman Kvyat won at Manfeild, and Britain's Alex Lynn won at Teretonga.

== Teams and drivers ==
Team	No.	Driver	Rounds
Giles Motorsport	1	(New Zealand) Mitch Evans	All
Giles Motorsport	7	(New Zealand) Nick Cassidy	All
Giles Motorsport	13	(Australia) Nick Foster	All
Giles Motorsport	36	(United Kingdom) Alex Lynn	1–4
M2 Competition	2	(New Zealand) Earl Bamber	4
M2 Competition	4	(Japan) Kotaro Sakurai	1–4
M2 Competition	5	(Russia) Ivan Lukashevich	1–4
M2 Competition	11	(New Zealand) Earl Bamber	3
M2 Competition	11	(New Zealand) Ken Smith	4
M2 Competition	22	(Australia) Jordan Skinner	All
ETEC Motorsport	8	(New Zealand) Jamie McNee	All
ETEC Motorsport	19	(Australia) Scott Pye	1–4
ETEC Motorsport	19	(New Zealand) Jono Lester	5
ETEC Motorsport	20	(United Kingdom) Josh Hill	1–4
ETEC Motorsport	48	(Germany) Mario Farnbacher	1–4
Dart International	17	(New Zealand) Alastair Wootten	All
Victory Motor Racing	29	(Russia) Daniil Kvyat	1–4
Victory Motor Racing	87	(New Zealand) Damon Leitch	All

== Calendar ==
The first four rounds were part of the International Trophy.

Round		Date	Circuit/Location
1	R1	15 January	(New Zealand) Teretonga Park, Invercargill
1	R2	16 January	(New Zealand) Teretonga Park, Invercargill
1	R3	16 January	(New Zealand) Teretonga Park, Invercargill
2	R1	22 January	(New Zealand) Timaru International Motor Raceway, Timaru
2	R2	23 January	(New Zealand) Timaru International Motor Raceway, Timaru
2	R3	23 January	(New Zealand) Timaru International Motor Raceway, Timaru
3	R1	5 February	(New Zealand) Hampton Downs Motorsport Park, Waikato
3	R2	6 February	(New Zealand) Hampton Downs Motorsport Park, Waikato
3	R3	6 February	(New Zealand) Hampton Downs Motorsport Park, Waikato
4	R1	12 February	(New Zealand) Manfeild Autocourse, Feilding
4	R2	13 February	(New Zealand) Manfeild Autocourse, Feilding
4	R3	13 February	(New Zealand) Manfeild Autocourse, Feilding
5	R1	12 March	(New Zealand) Taupo Motorsport Park, Taupō
5	R2	13 March	(New Zealand) Taupo Motorsport Park, Taupō
5	R3	13 March	(New Zealand) Taupo Motorsport Park, Taupō

== Results ==
Round		Circuit	Pole Position	Winning Driver	Winning Team	Round Winning Driver	Round Winning Team
1	R1	(New Zealand) Teretonga Park, Invercargill	(New Zealand) Mitch Evans	(Australia) Scott Pye	ETEC Motorsport	(New Zealand) Mitch Evans	Giles Motorsport
1	R2	(New Zealand) Teretonga Park, Invercargill	(New Zealand) Nick Cassidy	(New Zealand) Mitch Evans	Giles Motorsport	(New Zealand) Mitch Evans	Giles Motorsport
1	R3	(New Zealand) Teretonga Park, Invercargill		(United Kingdom) Alex Lynn	Giles Motorsport	(New Zealand) Mitch Evans	Giles Motorsport
2	R1	(New Zealand) Timaru International Motor Raceway, Timaru	(New Zealand) Mitch Evans	(New Zealand) Mitch Evans	Giles Motorsport	(New Zealand) Mitch Evans	Giles Motorsport
2	R2	(New Zealand) Timaru International Motor Raceway, Timaru	(New Zealand) Mitch Evans	(New Zealand) Mitch Evans	Giles Motorsport	(New Zealand) Mitch Evans	Giles Motorsport
2	R3	(New Zealand) Timaru International Motor Raceway, Timaru		(New Zealand) Jamie McNee	ETEC Motorsport	(New Zealand) Mitch Evans	Giles Motorsport
3	R1	(New Zealand) Hampton Downs Motorsport Park, Waikato	(Australia) Nick Foster	(New Zealand) Mitch Evans	Giles Motorsport	(New Zealand) Mitch Evans	Giles Motorsport
3	R2	(New Zealand) Hampton Downs Motorsport Park, Waikato		(New Zealand) Jamie McNee	ETEC Motorsport	(New Zealand) Mitch Evans	Giles Motorsport
3	R3	(New Zealand) Hampton Downs Motorsport Park, Waikato	(Australia) Nick Foster	(New Zealand) Mitch Evans	Giles Motorsport	(New Zealand) Mitch Evans	Giles Motorsport
4	R1	(New Zealand) Manfeild Autocourse, Feilding	(Russia) Daniil Kvyat	(Russia) Daniil Kvyat	Victory Motor Racing	(New Zealand) Mitch Evans	Giles Motorsport
4	R2	(New Zealand) Manfeild Autocourse, Feilding		(Russia) Ivan Lukashevich	M2 Competition	(New Zealand) Mitch Evans	Giles Motorsport
4	R3	(New Zealand) Manfeild Autocourse, Feilding	(New Zealand) Mitch Evans	(New Zealand) Mitch Evans	Giles Motorsport	(New Zealand) Mitch Evans	Giles Motorsport
5	R1	(New Zealand) Taupo Motorsport Park, Taupō	(New Zealand) Mitch Evans	(New Zealand) Nick Cassidy	Giles Motorsport	(New Zealand) Nick Cassidy	Giles Motorsport
5	R2	(New Zealand) Taupo Motorsport Park, Taupō	(New Zealand) Mitch Evans	(New Zealand) Mitch Evans	Giles Motorsport	(New Zealand) Nick Cassidy	Giles Motorsport
5	R3	(New Zealand) Taupo Motorsport Park, Taupō		(New Zealand) Nick Cassidy	Giles Motorsport	(New Zealand) Nick Cassidy	Giles Motorsport

== Championship standings ==
=== Scoring system ===
Position	1st	2nd	3rd	4th	5th	6th	7th	8th	9th	10th	11th	12th	13th	14th	15th	16th	17th	18th	19th	20th	21st	22nd	23rd	24th	25th	26th	27th	28th	29th	30th
Points	75	67	60	54	49	45	42	39	36	33	30	28	26	24	22	20	18	16	14	12	10	9	8	7	6	5	4	3	2	1

=== Drivers' Championship ===
Pos	Driver	TER			TIM			HMP			MAN			TAU			Points
1	(New Zealand) Mitch Evans	**2**	1	3	**1**	**1**	3	1	2	1	2	2	**1**	**Ret**	**1**	3	973
2	(New Zealand) Nick Cassidy	9	**2**	8	5	2	4	3	3	3	11	6	8	1	5	1	805
3	(New Zealand) Jamie McNee	6	10	11	12	6	1	5	1	6	13	7	12	6	2	7	675
4	(Australia) Scott Pye	1	4	5	3	4	7	11	9	4	3	4	3				628
5	(Russia) Daniil Kvyat	3	Ret	6	13	7	5	2	7	2	**1**	3	2				600
6	(New Zealand) Alastair Wootten	11	7	7	8	9	6	8	10	7	7	15	Ret	3	6	2	584
7	(Russia) Ivan Lukashevich	8	8	9	6	5	2	10	12	10	6	1	7				531
8	(New Zealand) Damon Leitch	Ret	3	4	11	8	Ret	6	5	14	8	8	Ret	4	8	6	517
9	(United Kingdom) Alex Lynn	4	6	1	2	3	10	4	4	Ret	9	9	Ret				514
10	(Australia) Nick Foster	5	9	Ret	7	10	Ret	**Ret**	13	**13**	5	14	5	2	3	5	510
11	(Australia) Jordan Skinner	10	Ret	12	9	11	9	12	Ret	11	10	Ret	10	7	7	8	410
12	(Germany) Mario Farnbacher	Ret	5	2	4	Ret	Ret	13	11	8	4	10	6				397
13	(United Kingdom) Josh Hill	Ret	12	10	Ret	13	8	9	8	9	12	5	4				368
14	(Japan) Kotaro Sakurai	7	11	13	10	12	Ret	14	14	12	14	11	9				325
15	(New Zealand) Earl Bamber							7	6	5	Ret	12	Ret				164
16	(New Zealand) Jono Lester													5	4	4	157
17	(New Zealand) Ken Smith										15	13	11				78
Pos	Driver	TER			TIM			HMP			MAN			TAU			Points

Colour	Result
Gold	Winner
Silver	Second place
Bronze	Third place
Green	Points classification
Blue	Non-points classification
Blue	Non-classified finish (NC)
Purple	Retired, not classified (Ret)
Red	Did not qualify (DNQ)
Red	Did not pre-qualify (DNPQ)
Black	Disqualified (DSQ)
White	Did not start (DNS)
White	Withdrew (WD)
White	Race cancelled (C)
Blank	Did not practice (DNP)
Blank	Did not arrive (DNA)
Blank	Excluded (EX)

**Bold** – Pole
**R** – Rookie
