= 2013 New Zealand Grand Prix =

- Race 3, Round 5 of 5 of the 2013 Toyota Racing Series

Race details
- Date: 10 February 2013
- Official name: LVIII New Zealand Grand Prix
- Location: Manfeild Autocourse, Feilding, New Zealand
- Course: Permanent racing facility
- Course length: 3.033 km (1.885 miles)
- Distance: 35 laps, 106.16 km (65.96 miles)
- Weather: Fine

Pole position
Driver	(Austria) Lucas Auer	Giles Motorsport
- Time: 1:03.472

Fastest lap
Driver	(New Zealand) Nick Cassidy	M2 Competition
- Time: 1:04.631 on lap 26

Podium
First	(New Zealand) Nick Cassidy	M2 Competition
Second	(United Kingdom) Alex Lynn	M2 Competition
Third	(Netherlands) Steijn Schothorst	M2 Competition

The 2013 New Zealand Grand Prix event for open wheel racing cars was held at Manfeild Autocourse near Feilding on 10 February 2013. It was the fifty-eighth New Zealand Grand Prix and was open to Toyota Racing Series cars. The event was also the third race of the fifth round of the 2013 Toyota Racing Series, the final race of the series.

Twenty Tatuus-Toyota cars started the race which was won by New Zealander Nick Cassidy for the second time in succession, a feat last achieved by Simon Wills who won the race back to back in 1998 and 1999.

The M2 Competition team dominated the race, filling all three podium positions. Briton Alex Lynn finished second, 0.7 seconds behind Cassidy. Third was Dutch driver Steijn Schothorst.

== Classification ==
=== Qualifying ===
Pos	No	Driver	Team	Time	Gap
1	11	(Austria) Lucas Auer	Giles Motorsport	1:03.472	
2	36	(United Kingdom) Alex Lynn	M2 Competition	1:03.520	+ 0.048 s
3	21	(Netherlands) Steijn Schothorst	M2 Competition	1:03.730	+ 0.258 s
4	1	(New Zealand) Nick Cassidy	M2 Competition	1:03.738	+ 0.266 s
5	5	(Brazil) Bruno Bonifacio	Giles Motorsport	1:03.843	+ 0.371 s
6	6	(Brazil) Pipo Derani	Giles Motorsport	1:03.913	+ 0.441 s
7	19	(Netherlands) Pieter Schothorst	M2 Competition	1:03.948	+ 0.476 s
8	23	(United Kingdom) Jann Mardenborough	ETEC Motorsport	1:03.972	+ 0.500 s
9	16	(Italy) Ignazio D'Agosto	Victory Motor Racing	1:04.036	+ 0.564 s
10	4	(Puerto Rico) Felix Serralles	Giles Motorsport	1:04.070	+ 0.598 s
11	18	(Canada) Nicholas Latifi	Giles Motorsport	1:04.128	+ 0.656 s
12	22	(Singapore) Andrew Tang	ETEC Motorsport	1:04.153	+ 0.681 s
13	43	(Thailand) Tanart Sathienthirakul	ETEC Motorsport	1:04.208	+ 0.736 s
14	3	(New Zealand) Damon Leitch	Victory Motor Racing	1:04.289	+ 0.817 s
15	44	(Norway) Dennis Olsen	M2 Competition	1:04.311	+ 0.839 s
16	7	(Colombia) Tatiana Calderón	ETEC Motorsport	1:04.342	+ 0.870 s
17	29	(Malaysia) Akash Nandy	ETEC Motorsport	1:04.429	+ 0.957 s
18	53	(New Zealand) Michael Scott	Victory Motor Racing	1:04.469	+ 0.997 s
19	10	(Australia) Spike Goddard	M2 Competition	1:04.498	+ 1.026 s
20	9	(New Zealand) Ken Smith	Giles Motorsport	1:04.965	+ 1.493 s

=== Race ===
Pos	No	Driver	Team	Laps	Gap
1	1	(New Zealand) Nick Cassidy	M2 Competition	35	40min 18.328sec
2	36	(United Kingdom) Alex Lynn	M2 Competition	35	+ 0.711 s
3	21	(Netherlands) Steijn Schothorst	M2 Competition	35	+ 2.371 s
4	6	(Brazil) Pipo Derani	Giles Motorsport	35	+ 3.148 s
5	5	(Brazil) Bruno Bonifacio	Giles Motorsport	35	+ 4.877 s
6	11	(Austria) Lucas Auer	Giles Motorsport	35	+ 5.232 s
7	23	(United Kingdom) Jann Mardenborough	ETEC Motorsport	35	+ 5.497 s
8	16	(Italy) Ignazio D'Agosto	Victory Motor Racing	35	+ 5.995 s
9	4	(Puerto Rico) Felix Serralles	Giles Motorsport	35	+ 8.248 s
10	22	(Singapore) Andrew Tang	ETEC Motorsport	35	+ 8.569 s
11	3	(New Zealand) Damon Leitch	Victory Motor Racing	35	+ 9.332 s
12	18	(Canada) Nicholas Latifi	Giles Motorsport	35	+ 10.548 s
13	7	(Colombia) Tatiana Calderón	ETEC Motorsport	35	+ 10.829 s
14	43	(Thailand) Tanart Sathienthirakul	ETEC Motorsport	35	+ 11.890 s
15	53	(New Zealand) Michael Scott	Victory Motor Racing	35	+ 12.493 s
16	9	(New Zealand) Ken Smith	Giles Motorsport	35	+ 17.070 s
17	19	(Netherlands) Pieter Schothorst	M2 Competition	34	+ 1 Lap
18	29	(Malaysia) Akash Nandy	ETEC Motorsport	33	+ 2 Laps
19	10	(Australia) Spike Goddard	M2 Competition	33	+ 2 Laps
Ret	44	(Norway) Dennis Olsen	M2 Competition	15	Retired

Preceded by 2012 New Zealand Grand Prix	New Zealand Grand Prix; 2013	Succeeded by 2014 New Zealand Grand Prix
