= 2015 New Zealand Grand Prix =

- Race 3, Round 5 of 5 of the 2015 Toyota Racing Series

Race details
- Date: 15 February 2015
- Official name: LX New Zealand Grand Prix
- Location: Manfeild Autocourse, Feilding, New Zealand
- Course: Permanent racing facility
- Course length: 3.033 km (1.885 miles)
- Distance: 35 laps, 106.16 km (65.96 miles)
- Weather: Fine

Pole position
Driver	(India) Arjun Maini	M2 Competition
- Time: 1:02.343

Fastest lap
Driver	(France) Brandon Maïsano	M2 Competition
- Time: 1:02.845 on lap 16

Podium
First	(Canada) Lance Stroll	M2 Competition
Second	(Republic of Ireland) Charlie Eastwood	M2 Competition
Third	(France) Brandon Maïsano	M2 Competition

The 2015 New Zealand Grand Prix event for open wheel racing cars was held at Manfeild Autocourse near Feilding on 15 February 2015. It was the sixtieth New Zealand Grand Prix and was open to Toyota Racing Series cars. The event was also the third race of the fifth round of the 2015 Toyota Racing Series, the final race of the series.

Twenty Tatuus-Toyota cars started the race which was won by 16-year-old Canadian Lance Stroll who became the third teenager in as many years to claim the Grand Prix after Mitch Evans and Nick Cassidy.

The race was dominated by the M2 Competition outfit, with Arjun Maini taking pole position, Brandon Maïsano the fastest lap and locked out the podium with Stroll winning, Charlie Eastwood second and Maisano third.

== Results ==
=== Qualifying ===
Pos	No	Driver	Team	Qualifying 1	Qualifying 2	Grid
1	36	(India) Arjun Maini	M2 Competition	1:02.598	1:02.343	1
2	5	(United Kingdom) Sam MacLeod	Giles Motorsport	1:02.723	1:02.349	2
3	12	(Italy) Matteo Ferrer	ETEC Motorsport	no time	1:02.622	3
4	19	(France) Brandon Maïsano	M2 Competition	1:02.502	1:02.661	4
5	18	(Canada) Lance Stroll	M2 Competition	1:02.723	1:02.695	5
6	28	(Republic of Ireland) Charlie Eastwood	M2 Competition	1:03.155	1:02.742	6
7	11	(Austria) Stefan Riener	Victory Motor Racing	1:03.283	1:02.749	7
8	49	(Australia) Thomas Randle	ETEC Motorsport	1:03.115	1:02.794	8
9	10	(United States) Santino Ferrucci	Giles Motorsport	1:03.050	1:02.876	9
10	7	(Brazil) Sérgio Sette Câmara	Giles Motorsport	1:03.022	1:02.912	10
11	17	(Russia) Nikita Mazepin	ETEC Motorsport	1:03.381	1:02.941	11
12	62	(Austria) Ferdinand Habsburg	Victory Motor Racing	1:03.393	1:02.941	12
13	40	(New Zealand) James Munro	Giles Motorsport	1:03.258	1:02.947	13
14	86	(New Zealand) Brendon Leitch	Victory Motor Racing	1:03.428	1:02.949	14
15	21	(Russia) Artem Markelov	Giles Motorsport	1:03.018	1:02.958	15
16	53	(United Kingdom) Callum Ilott	ETEC Motorsport	1:02.809	1:02.965	16
17	8	(Denmark) Mathias Kristensen	M2 Competition	1:03.200	1:03.053	17
18	4	(Mexico) Alfonso Celis Jr.	Giles Motorsport	1:03.110	1:03.280	18
19	87	(New Zealand) Damon Leitch	Victory Motor Racing	1:03.107	1:03.292	19
20	23	(New Zealand) Jamie Conroy	M2 Competition	1:04.005	1:03.292	20

=== Race ===
Pos	No	Driver	Team	Laps	Gap	Grid
1	18	(Canada) Lance Stroll	M2 Competition	35	40min 25.216sec	5
2	28	(Republic of Ireland) Charlie Eastwood	M2 Competition	35	+ 1.138 s	6
3	19	(France) Brandon Maïsano	M2 Competition	35	+ 1.239 s	4
4	5	(United Kingdom) Sam MacLeod	Giles Motorsport	35	+ 2.156 s	2
5	10	(United States) Santino Ferrucci	Giles Motorsport	35	+ 9.558 s	9
6	21	(Russia) Artem Markelov	Giles Motorsport	35	+ 10.240 s	15
7	12	(Italy) Matteo Ferrer	ETEC Motorsport	35	+ 10.486 s	3
8	11	(Austria) Stefan Riener	Victory Motor Racing	35	+ 13.326 s	7
9	49	(Australia) Thomas Randle	ETEC Motorsport	35	+ 14.723 s	8
10	87	(New Zealand) Damon Leitch	Victory Motor Racing	35	+ 24.146 s	19
11	17	(Russia) Nikita Mazepin	ETEC Motorsport	35	+ 24.259 s	11
12	23	(New Zealand) Jamie Conroy	M2 Competition	35	+ 25.085 s	20
13	4	(Mexico) Alfonso Celis Jr.	Giles Motorsport	35	+ 32.243 s	18
14	36	(India) Arjun Maini	M2 Competition	34	+ 1 lap	1
15	40	(New Zealand) James Munro	Giles Motorsport	34	+ 1 lap	13
16	86	(New Zealand) Brendon Leitch	Victory Motor Racing	33	+ 2 laps	14
17	7	(Brazil) Sérgio Sette Câmara	Giles Motorsport	32	+ 3 laps	10
18	8	(Denmark) Mathias Kristensen	M2 Competition	29	+ 6 laps	17
Ret	62	(Austria) Ferdinand Habsburg	Victory Motor Racing	4	Retired	12
Ret	53	(United Kingdom) Callum Ilott	ETEC Motorsport	1	Retired	16
Fastest Lap: Brandon Maïsano (M2 Competition) - 1:02.845

Preceded by 2014 New Zealand Grand Prix	New Zealand Grand Prix; 2015	Succeeded by 2016 New Zealand Grand Prix
