= 2014 New Zealand Grand Prix =

- Race 3, Round 5 of 5 of the 2014 Toyota Racing Series

Race details
- Date: 9 February 2014
- Official name: LIX New Zealand Grand Prix
- Location: Manfeild Autocourse, Feilding, New Zealand
- Course: Permanent racing facility
- Course length: 3.033 km (1.885 miles)
- Distance: 35 laps, 106.16 km (65.96 miles)

Pole position
Driver	(New Zealand) Nick Cassidy	Neale Motorsport
- Time: 1:09.939

Fastest lap
Driver	(Estonia) Martin Rump	Giles Motorsport
- Time: 1:03.889 on lap 33

Podium
First	(New Zealand) Nick Cassidy	Neale Motorsport
Second	(United Kingdom) Jann Mardenborough	Giles Motorsport
Third	(Singapore) Andrew Tang	Neale Motorsport

The 2014 New Zealand Grand Prix event for open wheel racing cars was held at Manfeild Autocourse near Feilding on 9 February 2014. It was the fifty-ninth New Zealand Grand Prix and was open to Toyota Racing Series cars. The event was also the third race of the fifth round of the 2014 Toyota Racing Series, the final race of the series.

Twenty Tatuus-Toyota cars started the race which was won by Nick Cassidy for the third time in a row, something last achieved by Craig Baird from 1991 to 1993.

== Classification ==
=== Qualifying ===
Pos	No	Driver	Team	Time	Grid
1	1	(New Zealand) Nick Cassidy	Neale Motorsport	1:09.939	1
2	22	(Singapore) Andrew Tang	Neale Motorsport	1:10.329	2
3	23	(United Kingdom) Jann Mardenborough	Giles Motorsport	1:10.375	3
4	4	(United States) Ryan Tveter	Giles Motorsport	1:10.605	4
5	40	(New Zealand) James Munro	Neale Motorsport	1:10.619	5
6	25	(Italy) Matteo Ferrer	Giles Motorsport	1:10.810	6
7	66	(Estonia) Martin Rump	Giles Motorsport	1:10.877	7
8	87	(New Zealand) Damon Leitch	Victory Motor Racing	1:10.889	8
9	56	(Switzerland) Levin Amweg	Neale Motorsport	1:10.893	9
10	14	(Australia) Macauley Jones	M2 Competition	1:11.081	10
11	27	(Croatia) Martin Kodrić	ETEC Motorsport	1:11.167	11
12	21	(Netherlands) Steijn Schothorst	ETEC Motorsport	1:11.171	12
13	55	(Russia) Egor Orudzhev	M2 Competition	1:11.223	13
14	53	(New Zealand) Michael Scott	Victory Motor Racing	1:11.226	14
15	5	(Brazil) Gustavo Lima	M2 Competition	1:11.236	15
16	26	(Russia) Denis Korneev	ETEC Motorsport	1:11.243	16
17	72	(Malaysia) Alif Hamdam	Giles Motorsport	1:11.272	17
18	7	(United Kingdom) Matt Rao	Giles Motorsport	1:11.374	18
19	41	(Sweden) Robin Hansson	Victory Motor Racing	1:11.701	19
20	16	(Russia) Matevos Isaakyan	ETEC Motorsport	1:11.895	20
21	88	(New Zealand) Brendon Leitch	Victory Motor Racing	1:12.043	21
22	42	(United States) Neil Alberico	Victory Motor Racing	1:12.089	22
23	17	(Australia) Jordan Oon	ETEC Motorsport	1:12.709	23

=== Race ===
Pos	No	Driver	Team	Laps	Gap	Grid
1	1	(New Zealand) Nick Cassidy	Neale Motorsport	35	41min 16.152sec	1
2	23	(United Kingdom) Jann Mardenborough	Giles Motorsport	35	+ 0.664 s	3
3	22	(Singapore) Andrew Tang	Neale Motorsport	35	+ 1.662 s	2
4	21	(Netherlands) Steijn Schothorst	M2 Competition	35	+ 4.634 s	12
5	40	(New Zealand) James Munro	Neale Motorsport	35	+ 5.604 s	5
6	56	(Switzerland) Levin Amweg	Neale Motorsport	35	+ 12.178 s	9
7	26	(Russia) Denis Korneev	ETEC Motorsport	35	+ 15.700 s	16
8	27	(Croatia) Martin Kodric	ETEC Motorsport	35	+ 16.368 s	11
9	5	(Brazil) Gustavo Lima	M2 Competition	35	+ 19.825 s	15
10	7	(United Kingdom) Matt Rao	Giles Motorsport	35	+ 20.438 s	18
11	88	(New Zealand) Brendon Leitch	Victory Motor Racing	35	+ 22.215 s	21
12	53	(New Zealand) Michael Scott	Victory Motor Racing	34	+ 1 lap	14
13	66	(Estonia) Martin Rump	Giles Motorsport	34	+ 1 lap	7
14	42	(United States) Neil Alberico	Victory Motor Racing	32	+ 3 laps	22
DNF	25	(Italy) Matteo Ferrer	Giles Motorsport	28	Retired	6
DNF	14	(Australia) Macauley Jones	M2 Competition	28	Retired	10
DNF	87	(New Zealand) Damon Leitch	Victory Motor Racing	17	Retired	8
DNF	16	(Russia) Matevos Isaakyan	ETEC Motorsport	15	Retired	20
DNF	72	(Malaysia) Alif Hamdan	Giles Motorsport	11	Retired	17
DNF	17	(Australia) Jordan Oon	ETEC Motorsport	8	Retired	23
DNF	55	(Russia) Egor Orudzhev	M2 Competition	6	Retired	13
DNF	4	(United States) Ryan Tveter	Giles Motorsport	1	Retired	4
DNS	41	(Sweden) Robin Hansson	Victory Motor Racing	0	Did Not Start	19
Fastest Lap: (Estonia) Martin Rump (Giles Motorsport) - 1:03.889

Preceded by 2013 New Zealand Grand Prix	New Zealand Grand Prix; 2015	Succeeded by 2015 New Zealand Grand Prix
