= 2013 Formula Renault 2.0 Alps Series =

2013 motorsport competition

Seasons
- ← 2012 2014 →

The 2013 Formula Renault 2.0 Alps Series was the third year of the Formula Renault 2.0 Alps series, and the twelfth season of the former Swiss Formula Renault Championship. The championship began on 6 April at Vallelunga and finished on 6 October at Imola after fourteen races held at seven meetings.

Debutant Antonio Fuoco dominated the championship from the first round, clinching both the junior and overall championship titles with a race to spare. Prema Powerteam drivers Luca Ghiotto and Bruno Bonifacio completed the top three in the drivers' standings, with the trio winning all fourteen races between them; Fuoco won six races, Ghiotto five and Bonifacio three. Ghiotto and Bonifacio also accrued enough points to win the teams title for Prema, with Fuoco's sister Prema Junior outfit finishing second.

== Drivers and teams ==
Team	No.	Driver name	Rounds
(France) Tech 1 Racing	1	(Russia) Ivan Taranov	1, 3
(France) Tech 1 Racing	2	(Canada) Luke Chudleigh	All
(France) Tech 1 Racing	10	(France) Pierre Gasly	1–2, 6
(France) Tech 1 Racing	11	(Russia) Egor Orudzhev	All
(France) Tech 1 Racing	12	(France) Matthieu Vaxivière	1–2
(France) Tech 1 Racing	51	(Indonesia) Philo Paz Patric Armand	4, 7
(Finland) SMP Racing by Koiranen GP	3	(Estonia) Hans Villemi	1–6
(Finland) SMP Racing by Koiranen GP	7	(Russia) Nikita Zlobin	1–2, 4–7
(Finland) SMP Racing by Koiranen GP	8	(Russia) Semen Evstigneev	All
(Finland) SMP Racing by Koiranen GP	9	(Poland) Alex Bosak	All
(Italy) Prema Junior	3	(Estonia) Hans Villemi	7
(Italy) Prema Junior	30	(Italy) Antonio Fuoco	All
(Italy) Prema Junior	31	(Australia) Matthew Solomon	5
(Finland) Koiranen GP	4	(Netherlands) Nyck de Vries	1–2, 6
(Finland) Koiranen GP	5	(United Kingdom) Matt Parry	7
(Finland) Koiranen GP	6	(Brazil) Guilherme Silva	1, 3, 6
(Italy) BVM Racing	15	(Italy) Dario Capitanio	All
(Italy) BVM Racing	16	(India) Parth Ghorpade	All
(Italy) Viola Formula Racing	18	(Italy) Daniele Cazzaniga	All
(Italy) Brixia Horse Power by Facondini Racing	19	(Italy) Andrea Baiguera	2, 5–6
(Austria) Interwetten.com Racing Team	20	(Russia) Konstantin Tereshchenko	All
(Austria) Interwetten.com Racing Team	21	(Mexico) Alejandro Abogado	1–6
(Austria) Interwetten.com Racing Team	22	(Portugal) Francisco Mora	All
(France) ARTA Engineering	23	(Thailand) Tanart Sathienthirakul	7
(France) ARTA Engineering	24	(France) Joffrey De Narda	1–5, 7
(France) ARTA Engineering	25	(France) Simon Gachet	All
(France) ARTA Engineering	26	(France) William Vermont	1–2, 6
(France) ARTA Engineering	27	(France) Simon Tirman	1–2, 4
(Italy) Prema Powerteam	32	(Italy) Luca Ghiotto	All
(Italy) Prema Powerteam	33	(Brazil) Bruno Bonifacio	All
(Switzerland) Jenzer Motorsport	35	(Switzerland) Kevin Jörg	All
(Switzerland) Jenzer Motorsport	36	(Russia) Denis Korneev	All
(Switzerland) Jenzer Motorsport	37	(Germany) Max Schaumburg-Lippe	1–2
(Switzerland) Jenzer Motorsport	38	(Singapore) Andrew Tang	All
(Switzerland) Jenzer Motorsport	46	(Argentina) Marcos Siebert	3
(Switzerland) Jenzer Motorsport	47	(Switzerland) Levin Amveg	3
(Italy) GSK Grand Prix	39	(Italy) Kevin Gilardoni	1–5
(Italy) GSK Grand Prix	42	(Ukraine) Danyil Pronenko	7
(Italy) GSK Grand Prix	88	(Russia) Dzhon Simonyan	All
(Spain) AV Formula	40	(France) Nicolas Jamin	3
(Spain) AV Formula	41	(Norway) Dennis Olsen	3
(Italy) JD Motorsport	55	(Poland) Jakub Dalewski	2–4, 7
(Italy) JD Motorsport	56	(Venezuela) Juan Branger	2, 4
(Italy) Team Torino Motorsport	57	(Australia) Joshua Raneri	1–3
(Italy) Team Torino Motorsport	58	(Italy) Alberto Di Folco	1–2
(Italy) Euronova Racing	70	(Japan) Ukyo Sasahara	All
(Italy) Euronova Racing	71	(United Kingdom) Gregor Ramsay	All
(Italy) Euronova Racing	72	(Venezuela) Javier Amado	1–6
(Italy) TS Corse	73	(Italy) Pietro Peccenini	All

== Race calendar and results ==
The seven-event calendar for the 2013 season was announced on 25 October 2012.

Round		Circuit	Date	Pole position	Fastest lap	Winning driver	Winning team	Junior winner
1	R1	(Italy) ACI Vallelunga Circuit	6 April	(Brazil) Bruno Bonifacio	(Brazil) Bruno Bonifacio	(Brazil) Bruno Bonifacio	(Italy) Prema Powerteam	(Italy) Antonio Fuoco
1	R2	(Italy) ACI Vallelunga Circuit	7 April	(Brazil) Bruno Bonifacio	(Brazil) Bruno Bonifacio	(Italy) Antonio Fuoco	(Italy) Prema Junior	(Italy) Antonio Fuoco
2	R1	(Italy) Autodromo Enzo e Dino Ferrari, Imola	11 May	(Italy) Antonio Fuoco	(France) William Vermont	(Italy) Antonio Fuoco	(Italy) Prema Junior	(Italy) Antonio Fuoco
2	R2	(Italy) Autodromo Enzo e Dino Ferrari, Imola	12 May	(Italy) Antonio Fuoco	(Italy) Antonio Fuoco	(Italy) Antonio Fuoco	(Italy) Prema Junior	(Italy) Antonio Fuoco
3	R1	(Belgium) Circuit de Spa-Francorchamps	8 June	(Brazil) Bruno Bonifacio	(Italy) Antonio Fuoco	(Brazil) Bruno Bonifacio	(Italy) Prema Powerteam	(Poland) Jakub Dalewski
3	R2	(Belgium) Circuit de Spa-Francorchamps	9 June	(Brazil) Bruno Bonifacio	(Italy) Luca Ghiotto	(Italy) Luca Ghiotto	(Italy) Prema Powerteam	(Italy) Luca Ghiotto
4	R1	(Italy) Autodromo Nazionale Monza	6 July	(Italy) Antonio Fuoco	(Italy) Antonio Fuoco	(Italy) Antonio Fuoco	(Italy) Prema Junior	(Italy) Antonio Fuoco
4	R2	(Italy) Autodromo Nazionale Monza	7 July	(Russia) Egor Orudzhev	(Italy) Luca Ghiotto	(Italy) Luca Ghiotto	(Italy) Prema Powerteam	(Italy) Luca Ghiotto
5	R1	(Italy) Misano World Circuit Marco Simoncelli	27 July	(Brazil) Bruno Bonifacio	(Italy) Luca Ghiotto	(Brazil) Bruno Bonifacio	(Italy) Prema Powerteam	(Italy) Antonio Fuoco
5	R2	(Italy) Misano World Circuit Marco Simoncelli	28 July	(Brazil) Bruno Bonifacio	(Italy) Luca Ghiotto	(Italy) Luca Ghiotto	(Italy) Prema Powerteam	(Italy) Luca Ghiotto
6	R1	(Italy) Mugello Circuit	7 September	(Italy) Antonio Fuoco	(Italy) Antonio Fuoco	(Italy) Antonio Fuoco	(Italy) Prema Junior	(Italy) Antonio Fuoco
6	R2	(Italy) Mugello Circuit	8 September	(Italy) Antonio Fuoco	(Italy) Antonio Fuoco	(Italy) Antonio Fuoco	(Italy) Prema Junior	(Italy) Antonio Fuoco
7	R1	(Italy) Autodromo Enzo e Dino Ferrari, Imola	5 October	(Italy) Luca Ghiotto	(Italy) Luca Ghiotto	(Italy) Luca Ghiotto	(Italy) Prema Powerteam	(Italy) Luca Ghiotto
7	R2	(Italy) Autodromo Enzo e Dino Ferrari, Imola	6 October	(Italy) Luca Ghiotto	(Italy) Luca Ghiotto	(Italy) Luca Ghiotto	(Italy) Prema Powerteam	(Italy) Luca Ghiotto

== Championship standings ==
=== Drivers' Championship ===
Pos	Driver	VAL (Italy)		IMO (Italy)		SPA (Belgium)		MNZ (Italy)		MIS (Italy)		MUG (Italy)		IMO (Italy)		Points
1	(Italy) Antonio Fuoco	2	1	1	1	14	3	1	6	2	Ret	1	1	2	2	245
2	(Italy) Luca Ghiotto	5	2	6	6	Ret	1	3	1	11	1	3	5	1	1	211
3	(Brazil) Bruno Bonifacio	1	Ret	4	3	1	2	2	Ret	1	Ret	10	7	20	23	145
4	(Switzerland) Kevin Jörg	11	10	14	15	3	4	7	Ret	3	3	8	4	14	5	90
5	(Russia) Egor Orudzhev	14	26	9	11	Ret	Ret	4	16	4	2	7	Ret	6	3	75
6	(France) Pierre Gasly	3	4	2	4							11	3			72
7	(Estonia) Hans Villemi	Ret	Ret	11	12	Ret	5	5	4	6	4	14	13	4	9	69
8	(Netherlands) Nyck de Vries	4	Ret	5	5							2	2			68
9	(France) William Vermont	Ret	6	3	2							4	6			61
10	(Poland) Jakub Dalewski			7	8	2	7	12	10					Ret	4	47
11	(Brazil) Guilherme Silva	6	3			4	Ret					6	Ret			43
12	(France) Joffrey De Narda	Ret	Ret	31	17	8	14	6	2	16	9			8	13	38
13	(Japan) Ukyo Sasahara	8	8	21	18	7	16	15	15	8	6	9	8	23	21	32
14	(France) Simon Gachet	16	Ret	24	Ret	13	18	25	13	7	5	13	11	5	Ret	28
15	(Russia) Konstantin Tereshchenko	17	23	32	16	5	10	Ret	19	5	20	19	12	15	8	25
16	(India) Parth Ghorpade	9	Ret	27	28	11	9	17	12	15	11	5	9	25	6	24
17	(France) Simon Tirman	27	Ret	10	9			9	3							20
18	(France) Matthieu Vaxivière	Ret	5	8	7											20
19	(United Kingdom) Gregor Ramsay	7	24	12	13	Ret	Ret	Ret	5	9	13	12	14	12	10	19
20	(Singapore) Andrew Tang	12	15	15	14	6	8	Ret	9	13	21	23	22	9	Ret	18
21	(Italy) Kevin Gilardoni	10	9	18	Ret	12	Ret	10	7	18	7					16
22	(Italy) Dario Capitanio	Ret	7	13	20	16	12	8	Ret	12	Ret	Ret	10	11	20	12
23	(Argentina) Marcos Siebert					9	6									10
24	(Canada) Luke Chudleigh	19	16	25	10	Ret	13	Ret	11	14	10	NC	Ret	7	Ret	10
25	(Russia) Denis Korneev	DNS	Ret	22	22	21	15	16	20	17	8	15	15	16	7	10
26	(Portugal) Francisco Mora	15	13	Ret	Ret	10	Ret	11	8	28	Ret	27	20	24	18	5
27	(Russia) Dzhon Simonyan	26	14	33	19	25	17	24	Ret	22	12	26	Ret	11	Ret	2
28	(Italy) Alberto Di Folco	18	11	17	24											0
29	(Switzerland) Levin Amweg					18	11									0
30	(Poland) Alex Bosak	23	17	26	Ret	19	21	18	Ret	25	15	20	17	17	12	0
31	(Australia) Joshua Raneri	21	12	Ret	Ret	WD	WD									0
32	(Mexico) Alejandro Abogado	22	19	29	25	17	NC	13	DNS	24	Ret	24	21			0
33	(Russia) Semen Evstigneev	Ret	Ret	Ret	26	22	20	19	Ret	27	19	25	Ret	13	20	0
34	(Russia) Ivan Taranov	13	25			20	19									0
35	(Venezuela) Javier Amado	Ret	20	19	23	DNS	DNS	14	14	19	Ret	21	16			0
36	(Russia) Nikita Zlobin	25	18	28	27			Ret	18	20	14	18	18	18	14	0
37	(Norway) Dennis Olsen					15	Ret									0
38	(Italy) Andrea Baiguera			20	29					26	17	16	Ret			0
39	(Italy) Daniele Cazzaniga	28	21	Ret	21	23	22	20	Ret	21	18	22	Ret	21	16	0
40	(Venezuela) Juan Branger			16	Ret			23	Ret							0
41	(Italy) Pietro Peccenini	24	22	30	Ret	24	23	22	17	23	22	17	19	19	19	0
42	(Germany) Max Schaumburg-Lippe	20	Ret	23	Ret											0
	(France) Nicolas Jamin					DNS	DNS									0
Guest drivers ineligible for points
	(United Kingdom) Matt Parry													3	15	0
	(Australia) Matthew Solomon									10	16					0
	(Thailand) Tanart Sathienthirakul													Ret	11	0
	(Ukraine) Danyil Pronenko													Ret	17	0
	(Indonesia) Philo Paz Patric Armand							21	Ret					22	Ret	0
Pos	Driver	VAL (Italy)		IMO (Italy)		SPA (Belgium)		MNZ (Italy)		MIS (Italy)		MUG (Italy)		IMO (Italy)		Points

Colour	Result
Gold	Winner
Silver	Second place
Bronze	Third place
Green	Points classification
Blue	Non-points classification
Blue	Non-classified finish (NC)
Purple	Retired, not classified (Ret)
Red	Did not qualify (DNQ)
Red	Did not pre-qualify (DNPQ)
Black	Disqualified (DSQ)
White	Did not start (DNS)
White	Withdrew (WD)
White	Race cancelled (C)
Blank	Did not practice (DNP)
Blank	Did not arrive (DNA)
Blank	Excluded (EX)

=== Juniors' championship ===
Pos	Driver	VAL (Italy)		IMO (Italy)		SPA (Belgium)		MNZ (Italy)		MIS (Italy)		MUG (Italy)		IMO (Italy)		Points
1	(Italy) Antonio Fuoco	2	1	1	1	14	3	1	6	2	Ret	1	1	2	2	268
2	(Italy) Luca Ghiotto	5	2	6	6	Ret	1	3	1	11	1	3	5	1	1	228
3	(Switzerland) Kevin Jörg	11	10	14	15	3	4	7	Ret	3	3	8	4	14	5	123
4	(Russia) Egor Orudzhev	14	26	9	11	Ret	Ret	4	16	4	2	7	Ret	6	3	105
5	(Estonia) Hans Villemi	Ret	Ret	11	12	Ret	5	5	4	6	4	14	13	4	9	97
6	(France) Pierre Gasly	3	4	2	4							10	3			90
7	(Netherlands) Nyck de Vries	4	Ret	5	5							2	2			81
8	(Japan) Ukyo Sasahara	8	8	21	18	7	16	15	15	8	6	9	8	23	21	72
9	(Poland) Jakub Dalewski			7	8	2	7	12	10					Ret	4	70
10	(France) Joffrey De Narda	Ret	Ret	31	17	8	14	6	2	16	9			8	13	68
11	(United Kingdom) Gregor Ramsay	7	24	12	13	Ret	Ret	Ret	5	9	13	12	14	12	10	56
12	(Italy) Dario Capitanio	Ret	7	13	20	16	12	8	Ret	12	Ret	Ret	10	11	20	45
13	(France) Simon Tirman	27	Ret	10	9			9	3							33
14	(Portugal) Francisco Mora	15	13	Ret	Ret	10	Ret	11	8	28	Ret	27	20	24	18	23
15	(Argentina) Marcos Siebert					9	6									20
16	(Russia) Nikita Zlobin	25	18	28	27			Ret	18	20	14	18	18	18	14	10
17	(Russia) Semen Evstigneev	Ret	Ret	Ret	26	22	20	19	Ret	27	19	25	Ret	13	20	8
18	(Italy) Alberto Di Folco	18	11	17	24											7
19	(Venezuela) Javier Amado	Ret	20	19	23	DNS	DNS	14	14	19	Ret	21	16			4
20	(Norway) Dennis Olsen					15	Ret									4
	(Germany) Max Schaumburg-Lippe	20	Ret	23	Ret											0
	(Venezuela) Juan Branger			16	Ret			23	Ret							0
	(Indonesia) Philo Paz Patric Armand							21	Ret					22	Ret	0
Pos	Driver	VAL (Italy)		IMO (Italy)		SPA (Belgium)		MNZ (Italy)		MIS (Italy)		MUG (Italy)		IMO (Italy)		Points

=== Teams' championship ===
Prior to each round of the championship, two drivers from each team – if applicable – are nominated to score teams' championship points.

Pos	Team	Points
1	(Italy) Prema Powerteam	355
2	(Italy) Prema Junior	219
3	(France) Tech 1 Racing	174
4	(France) ARTA Engineering	144
5	(Finland) Koiranen GP	111
6	(Switzerland) Jenzer Motorsport	108
7	(Finland) SMP Racing by Koiranen GP	52
8	(Italy) Euronova Racing	51
9	(Italy) JD Motorsport	47
10	(Italy) BVM Racing	36
11	(Austria) Interwetten.com Racing Team	30
12	(Italy) GSK Grand Prix	18
	(Italy) Torino Motorsport	0
	(Italy) TS Corse	0
	(Italy) Viola Formula Racing	0
	(Spain) AV Formula	0
