= Dmitry Suranovich =

Russian racing driver (born 1995)

- Nationality: (Russia) Russian (Belarus) Belarusian
- Born: Dmitry Igorevich Suranovich; 27 June 1995 (age 31) Minsk (Belarus)
- Retired: 2013

FIA European Formula 3 Championship
- Years active: 2013
- Teams: Fortec Motorsports
- Starts: 3
- Wins: 0
- Poles: 0
- Fastest laps: 0

Previous series
- 2012 2012 2011: GP3 Series; Toyota Racing Series; Formula Abarth

Dmitry Igorevich Suranovich (Russian: Дмитрий Игоревич Суранович, born 27 June 1995 in Minsk) is a retired professional racing driver from Belarus, who has Russian citizenship and raced under a Russian racing licence.

== Career ==
=== Karting ===
Suranovich began karting in 2008 and raced in various international series, working his way up from the junior ranks to progress through to the KF3 and KF2 category by 2011. He was a champion in Russian KF3 and KF2 championships in 2009 and 2010 respectively.

=== Formula Abarth ===
In 2011, just after reaching 16 years old, Suranovich graduated to single–seaters, racing in the Formula Abarth for Euronova Racing by Fortec joining compatriot Sergey Sirotkin. He made his début at Red Bull Ring with four rounds to spare, finishing in both Italian and European Series standings with just a single point.

=== Toyota Racing Series ===
In 2012, Suranovich joined Victory Motor Racing for participation in Toyota Racing Series At Timaru, he scored his first podium, finishing on second place.

=== GP3 Series ===
Also in 2012, Suranovich made his debut in GP3 Series with Marussia Manor Racing. He was excluded from the second race in Monaco for ignoring black and orange flags and then causing a major collision with Conor Daly.

=== European Formula Three ===
For 2013, Suranovich made his debut in European Formula Three with Fortec alongside Britain's Josh Hill, Brazil's Pipo Derani and Puerto Rico's Félix Serrallés. After the first round in Monza, Suranovich began having money trouble and could not continue to compete and pulled out of the second round at Silverstone.

== Retirement ==
Suranovich officially retired from racing, aged 17.

== Personal life ==
His father is Igor Suranovich, a famous former Belarusian fencer. Dmitry also enjoys archery and tennis. In 2017, he got a degree in Numerical Analysis.

== Racing record ==
=== Career summary ===
Season	Series	Team	Races	Wins	Poles	F/Laps	Podiums	Points	Position
2011	Formula Abarth European Series	Euronova Racing by Fortec	8	0	0	0	0	1	25th
2011	Formula Abarth Italian Series	Euronova Racing by Fortec	4	0	0	0	0	1	24th
2012	Toyota Racing Series	Victory Motor Racing	9	0	0	0	1	319	9th
2012	GP3 Series	Marussia Manor Racing	15	0	0	0	0	0	23rd
2013	Formula 3 Brazil Open	Hitech Racing Brazil	1	0	0	0	1	N/A	**2nd**
2013	FIA European Formula 3 Championship	Fortec Motorsports	3	0	0	0	0	0	33rd

=== Complete GP3 Series results ===
(key) (Races in bold indicate pole position) (Races in italics indicate fastest lap)

Year	Entrant	1	2	3	4	5	6	7	8	9	10	11	12	13	14	15	16	DC	Points
2012	Marussia Manor Racing	CAT; FEA; 11	CAT; SPR; Ret	MON; FEA; 16	MON; SPR; DSQ	VAL; FEA; Ret	VAL; SPR; 15	SIL; FEA; 22	SIL; SPR; 20	HOC; FEA; 15	HOC; SPR; 14	HUN; FEA; Ret	HUN; SPR; 16	SPA; FEA; 22	SPA; SPR; 18	MNZ; FEA; 22	MNZ; SPR; DNS	23rd	0
