= Nick Cassidy =

New Zealand racing driver (born 1994)

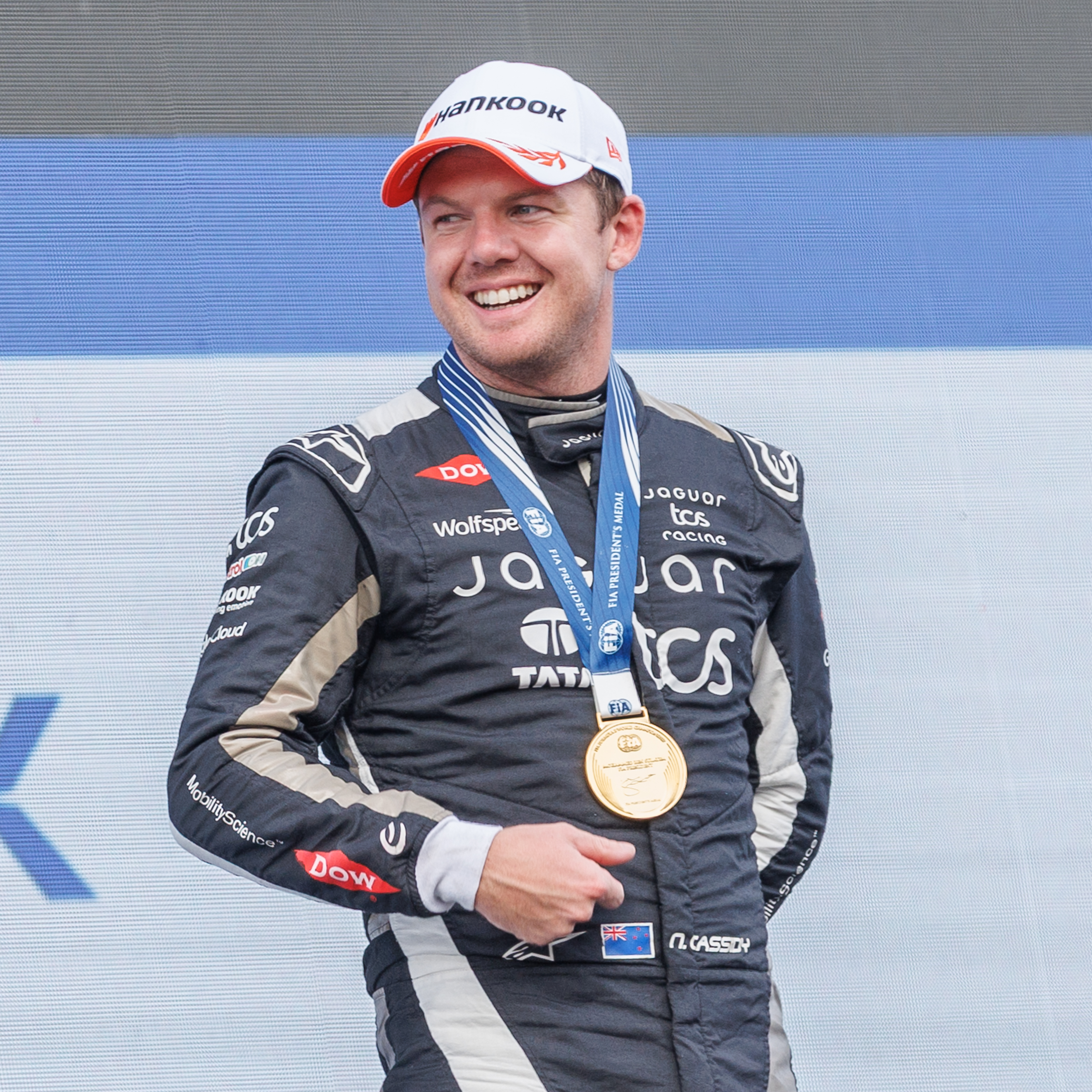
- Cassidy at the 2025 Berlin ePrix
- Nationality: (New Zealand) New Zealander
- Born: Nicholas Robert Cassidy; 19 August 1994 (age 32) Auckland, New Zealand

Formula E career
- Debut season: 2020–21
- Current team: Citroën
- Categorisation: FIA Gold (until 2023); FIA Platinum (2024–)
- Car number: 37
- Former teams: Envision, Jaguar
- Starts: 87
- Wins: 12
- Podiums: 27
- Poles: 8
- Fastest laps: 10
- Best finish: 2nd in 2022–23, 2024–25
- Finished last season: 2nd (153 pts)

Previous series
- 2019–22 2017–20 2016–20 2015 2014 2013–16 2012–14 2011–14 2011 2011 2011 2010–11: DTM; Super Formula; Super GT; All-Japan Formula 3 Formula Renault 2.0 Alps; European Formula 3 Formula Renault 2.0 Eurocup; Toyota Racing Series; Fujitsu V8 Supercar Series; Formula Abarth; ADAC Formel Masters; Australian Formula Ford

Championship titles
- 2012–13 2012–13–14 2015 2017 2019: Toyota Racing Series; New Zealand Grand Prix; All-Japan Formula 3 Super GT; Super Formula

Nicholas Robert Cassidy (born 19 August 1994) is a New Zealand racing driver, who competes in the Formula E World Championship for the Citroën Formula E Team and in the FIA World Endurance Championship for Peugeot in the Hypercar class.

He previously raced for Jaguar and Envision Racing in the series for three seasons, and finished as the runner-up during the 2022–23 and 2024-25 seasons. He has also won the 2017 Super GT Series and the 2019 Super Formula Championship.

== Career ==
Cassidy began his racing career in karting when he was just six years old and remained in karting till 2010. He participated in midget races from the age of eight.

After driving in Formula First championships, Cassidy started racing in the Formula Ford championships in New Zealand and Australia. In 2009, Cassidy was runner-up in the New Zealand Formula First Championship, and in 2010, he was runner-up in the New Zealand Formula Ford Championship. Both times, he was named Rookie of the year.

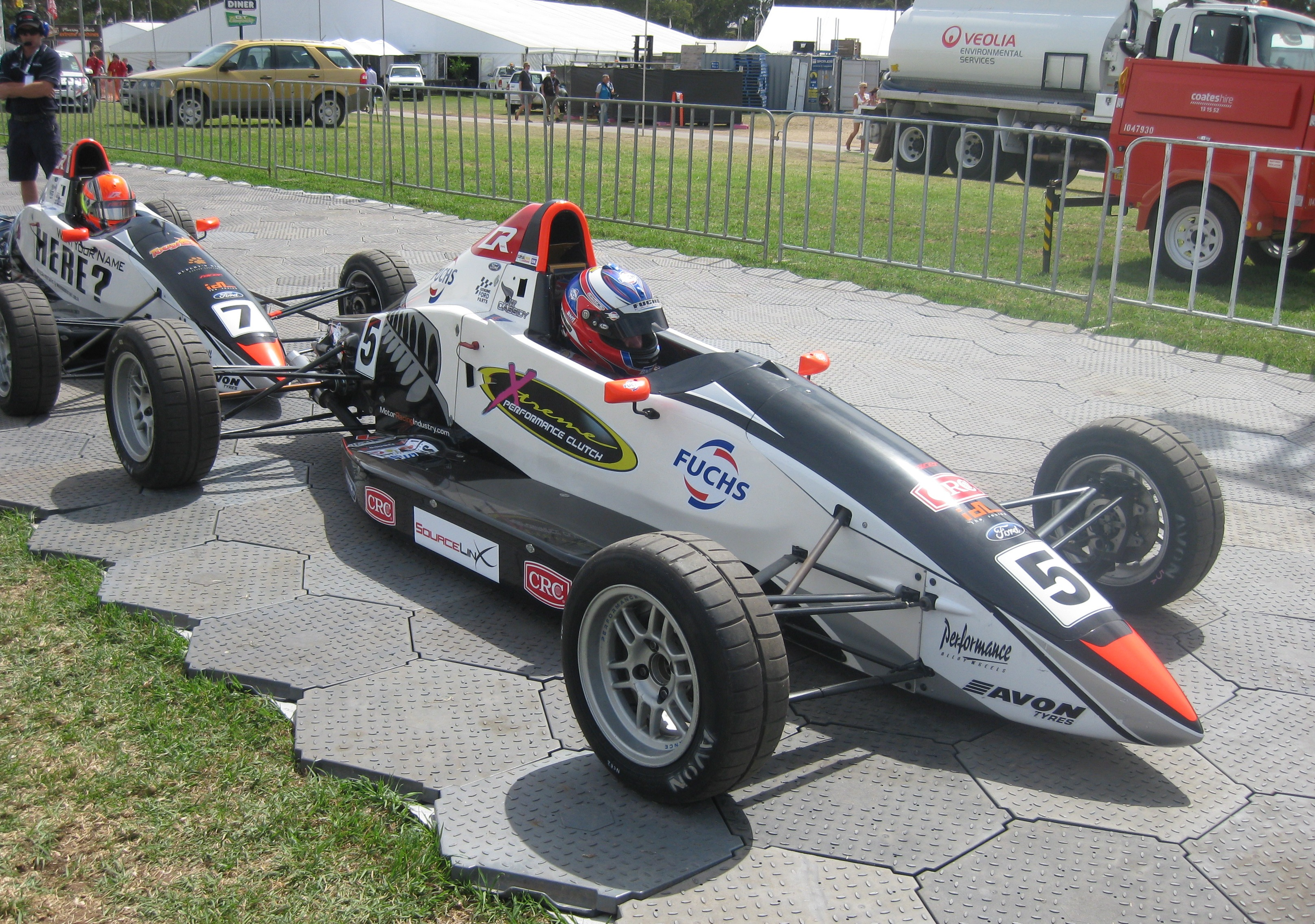
Cassidy placed 14th in the 2011 Australian Formula Ford Championship in a Mygale SJ11a

In 2011, Cassidy began the year for Giles Motorsport, in the Toyota Racing Series. After five podium finishes, he won two of three races on the last race weekend. He was named Rookie of the Year and finished runner-up in the championship to his teammate Mitch Evans.

Cassidy started a few races in the Australian Formula Ford Championship, such as the ADAC Formel Masters and the Formula Abarth. He competed in five races in the Fujitsu V8 Supercar Series. In 2012, Cassidy participated in the Toyota Racing Series again, remaining with Giles Motorsport. In two consecutive weeks of 2018, Cassidy lost final-round title battles in both Super Formula and Super GT, finishing second in both series.

In 2019, Cassidy completed the 'triple crown' in Japanese motorsport by winning the Super Formula title. He made his Formula E debut in the 2020–21 Formula E season for Envision Virgin Racing, replacing Sam Bird. He also made his debut in the Deutsche Tourenwagen Masters for a combined entry of AF Corse and Red Bull Racing, replacing Red Bull Racing Reserve Driver Alex Albon in the final round of the 2021 season at the Norisring. He drove Red Bull's Ferrari 488 GT3s for the 2022 season.

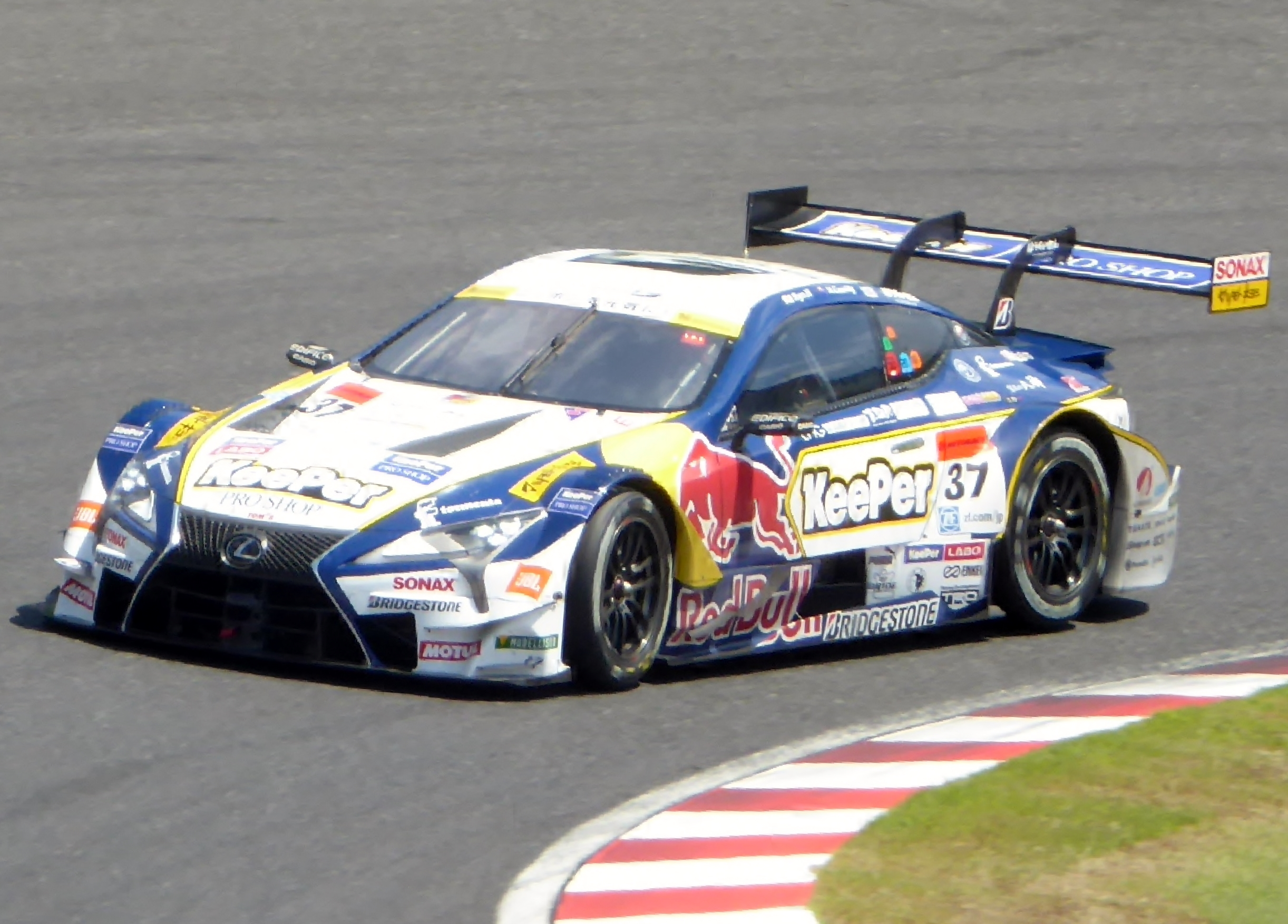
Cassidy and Ryo Hirakawa were GT500 champions in 2017, driving the No. 37 Lexus LC 500 for TOM'S.

== Formula E ==
=== Envision Racing (2021–2023) ===
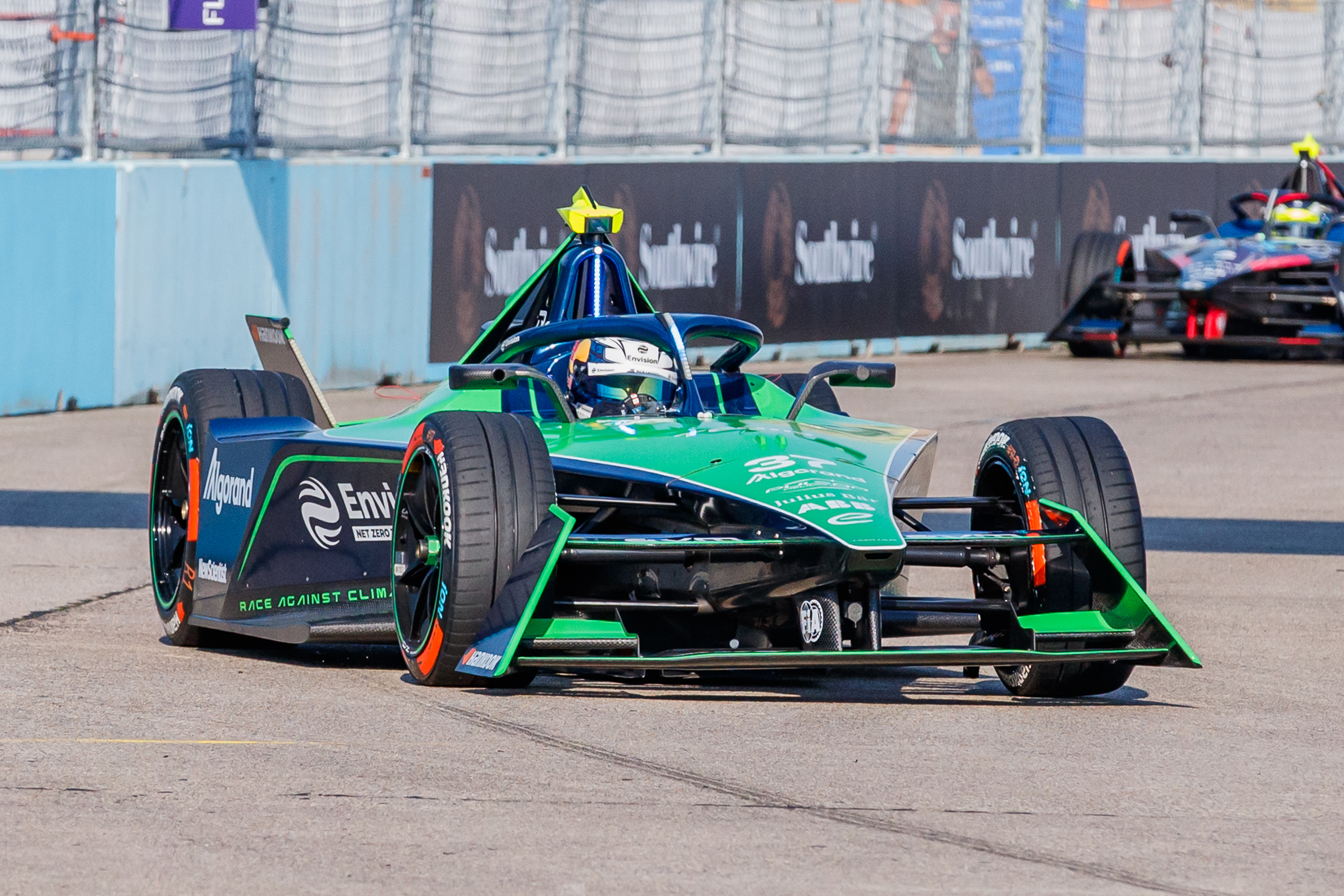
Cassidy during the 2023 Berlin ePrix

Cassidy began competing in Formula E for the Envision Virgin Racing team starting with the 2020–21 season, partnering Robin Frijns. Having failed to score during the first three races, Cassidy scored his first pole position during a wet-weather session at Rome. However, Cassidy spun out of the lead on the opening lap as a result of a software glitch, before being pushed into the wall and out of the race by Oliver Rowland. He scored points in the following rounds in Valencia and Monaco before achieving his maiden podium at the Puebla ePrix. At the next race in New York City, Cassidy scored another pole and led the race until the closing laps, when a misjudged move by Jean-Éric Vergne forced the Kiwi down to fourth. He returned to the podium on Sunday, though this would be his final podium of the year, as Cassidy finished a chaotic season of Formula E 15th in the standings, 23 points behind champion Nyck de Vries.

For the 2021–22 season, Cassidy remained at Envision, once again partnering Frijns. The opening half of his season yielded little success for the New Zealander, who only took three points finishes in the first ten races. Just like the previous year, Cassidy qualified on pole pole position for the first race in New York, one he would convert into his first Formula E victory despite being involved in a multi-car pileup thanks to a sudden rain shower late in the race, as the event was aborted and countback rules were applied to the classification. He qualified on pole the following day only to be sent to the back of the grid as repairs to his car forced the team to use a fifth radiator of the season, earning Cassidy a 30-place grid penalty. Cassidy finished on the podium at London as a result of a penalty for De Vries and ended the season eleventh in the standings, four positions behind teammate Frijns.

Envision retained Cassidy ahead of the 2022–23 campaign, with him being partnered by Season 2 champion Sébastien Buemi. After two events that earned him points finishes, Cassidy scored back-to-back podiums at Hyderabad and Cape Town before missing out narrowly on victory to Mitch Evans at the São Paulo ePrix. The Kiwi continued his championship assault in Germany, winning the second race of the Berlin ePrix, narrowing his gap to leader Pascal Wehrlein to four points. At the next round in Monaco, Cassidy charged from his starting spot of tenth to second within the opening seven laps, before executing a pass on title rival Evans to take victory in the principality. Cassidy struggled in Jakarta, finishing seventh on Saturday before losing out on points on Sunday after damaging his front wing in a self-inflicted accident with Wehrlein, though he would return to form with a win at Portland, having managed his car's energy well in a pandemonious, peloton-style race. Rome brought a podium on the opening day for Cassidy, however a crash caused by Evans on Sunday caused Cassidy to finish in a lowly 14th. Still with good chances to win the title, Cassidy qualified second for the first London race but was promoted to pole after Evans's penalty for the Rome accident had been applied. During the race, drama ensued: Cassidy, who had been leading the race until his first attack mode activation dropped him back to fourth, became the victim in a teammate collision as miscommunication caused him to rip of his car's front wing, with Buemi, who had been ready to help Cassidy in his title ambitions by letting the Kiwi through, received no communication from his team. As Cassidy retired due to the damage, Jake Dennis managed to take the title on Saturday. A win from pole on a rainy Sunday acted as consolation for Cassidy, who finished the season second in the championship.

=== Jaguar Racing (2024–2025) ===
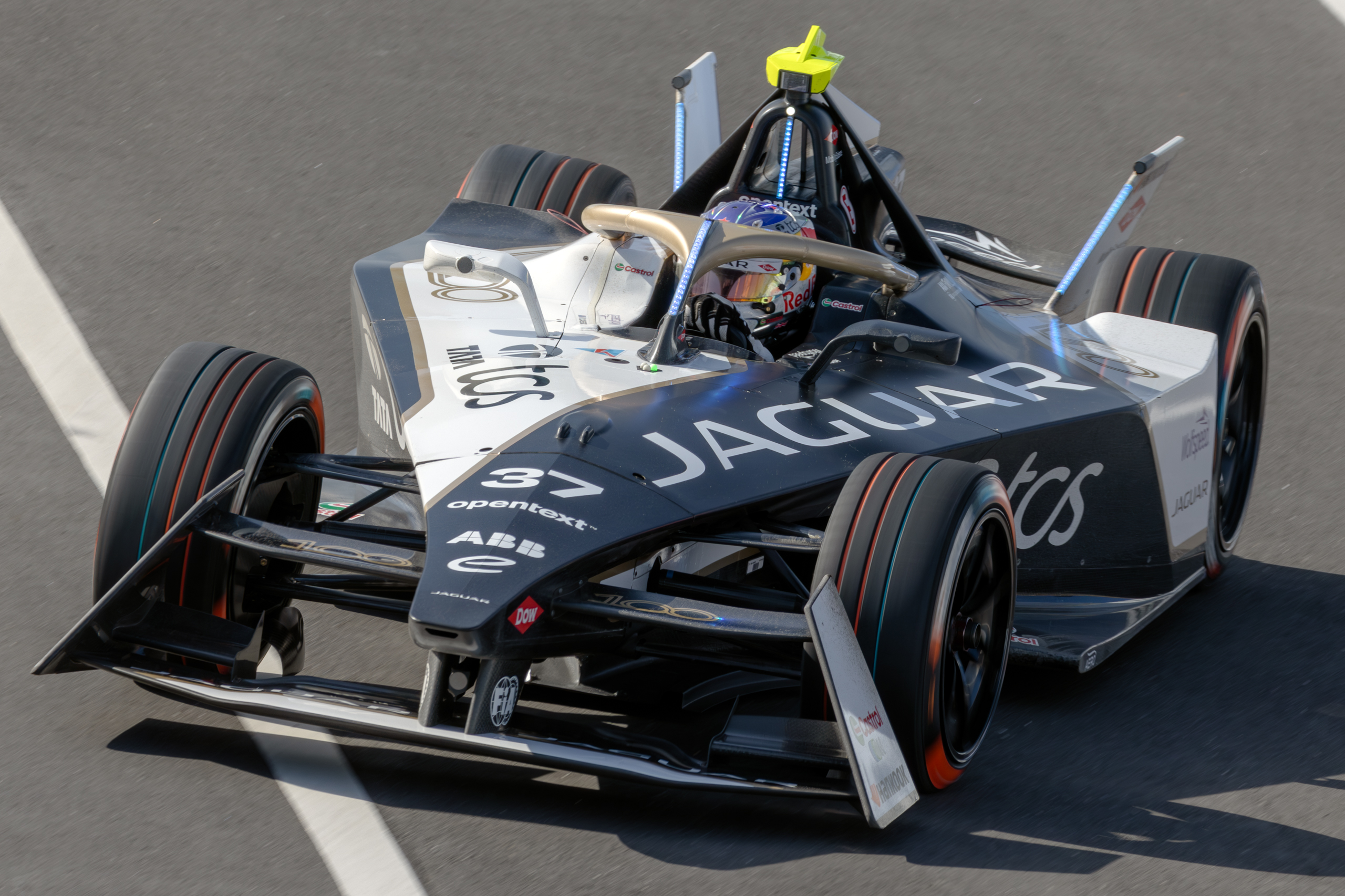
Cassidy at the 2024 Tokyo ePrix

Cassidy switched to Jaguar TCS Racing on a multi-year contract, replacing Sam Bird and partnering fellow Kiwi driver Mitch Evans for the 2023–24 Formula E season. Having been consistent through the first half of the season, Cassidy scored two victories and six more podiums. He entered the 2024 Portland ePrix with a lead of 25 points over Pascal Wehrlein. Cassidy was leading race 1 of the Portland ePrix until the penultimate lap, where he spun out. He left Portland with no points scored across the two races. A disastrous qualifying in London race 1 and an accident in race two with António Félix da Costa meant Cassidy could only finish the season in third place.

Cassidy left Jaguar following the end of the 2024–25 season.

=== Citroën (2025–present) ===
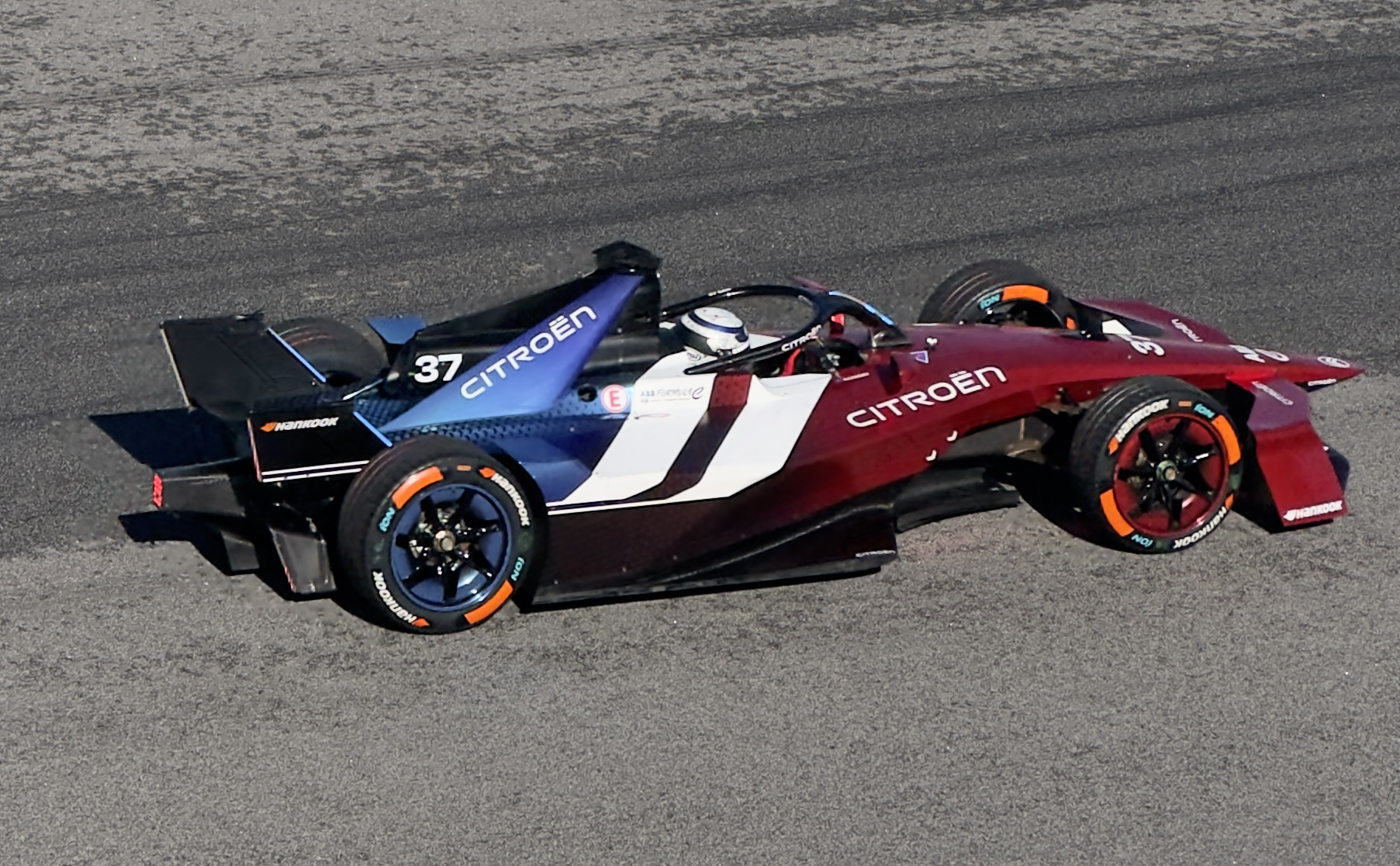
Cassidy at the 2025 Pre-season testing session at Circuit Ricardo Tormo.

In September 2025, Cassidy was announced to be joining new team Citroën Racing for the 2025–26 season alongside double champion Jean-Éric Vergne.

Cassidy is set to continue at Citroën for the 2026–27 season alongside Vergne.

== Endurance racing career ==
=== 2026 ===
In 2026, Cassidy will drive for Peugeot in the Hypercar class of the FIA World Endurance Championship.

== Karting record ==
=== Karting career summary ===
Season	Series	Team	Position
2003	Kartsport NZ Schools Championship — Cadet	Marina View Primary	NC
2003	Kartsport NZ North Island Sprint Championship — Cadet		1st
2003	Kartsport NZ National Sprint Championship — Cadet		NC
2004	Kartsport NZ National Sprint Championship — Cadet		1st
2004	Kartsport NZ North Island Sprint Championship — Cadet		NC
2005	NZ Top Half Series — JR 100cc Yamaha		2nd
2005	NZ North Island Sprint Kart Championship — Junior Restricted		1st
2006	NZ Top Half Series — JR 100cc Yamaha		15th
2006	Kartsport NZ National Sprint Championship — 100cc Junior Restricted Yamaha		1st
2007	Rotax Max Challenge New Zealand — Junior		DNF
2007	NZ Top Half Series — JR 100cc Yamaha		19th
2007	Hawkes Bay Kart Club – 40th Annual Blossom Sprint Meeting — Junior 100cc Yamaha GP		2nd
2007	CIK Trophy of New Zealand Challenge Cup — Junior Yamaha		1st
2007	NZ North Island Sprint Kart Championship — Formula Junior		1st
2007	Kartsport NZ North Island Sprint Kart Championship — 100cc Junior Yamaha		1st
2008	CIK Trophy of New Zealand Challenge Cup — Junior Yamaha		1st
2008	CIK Trophy of New Zealand — Junior ICA		1st
2008	Rotax Max Challenge Grand Finals — Junior		11th
2008	Gen-i Rotax Max Challenge NZ — Arai Helmets Junior		1st
2009	Gen-i Rotax Max Challenge NZ — Arai Junior		DNF
2010	Mi Sedaap NZ Pro Kart Series — KZ2		26th

== Racing record ==
=== Racing career summary ===
Season	Series	Team	Races	Wins	Poles	F/Laps	Podiums	Points	Position
2008	Formula First Manfeild Winter Series	Sabre Motorsport	12	3	2	2	9	782	**1st**
2008–09	New Zealand Formula First Championship	Sabre Motorsport	24	8	2	8	16	1439	**2nd**
2009	Formula Ford NZ Winter Series		6	3	2	3	3	225	7th
2009–10	New Zealand Formula First Championship		3	1	1	1	3	195	26th
2009–10	Western Springs Speedway – F2 Midgets	HLR Racing	8	7	0	7	8	290	**1st**
2009–10	New Zealand Formula Ford Championship	BNT/Fuchs Motorsport	18	8	3	5	14	1090	**2nd**
2010	Australian Formula Ford Championship	Evans Motorsport Group	3	0	0	0	1	26	15th
2010–11	Western Springs Speedway – Midgets	HLR Racing	3	0	0	0	1	36	20th
2010–11	Western Springs Speedway – International Midget Series	HLR Racing	4	0	0	0	0	25	14th
2011	Toyota Racing Series	Giles Motorsport	15	2	1	3	7	805	**2nd**
2011	Australian Formula Ford Championship	Evans Motorsport Group	2	0	0	0	1	22	14th
2011	Formula Abarth European Series	Composit Motorsport	2	0	0	0	0	6	17th
2011	Formula ACI/CSAI Abarth Italian Championship	Composit Motorsport	2	0	0	0	0	6	17th
2011	ADAC Formel Masters	Ma-con Motorsport	3	0	0	0	0	8	22nd
2011	V8 Fujitsu Supercar Series	Greg Murphy Racing	5	0	0	0	0	153	31st
2012	Toyota Racing Series	Giles Motorsport	14	4	0	3	9	914	**1st**
2012	V8SuperTourers Endurance Championship	M3 Racing	2	1	0	0	2	1852	**1st**
2012	Eurocup Formula Renault 2.0	Fortec Motorsport	6	0	0	0	0	8	24th
2013	Toyota Racing Series	M2 Competition	15	2	0	6	10	915	**1st**
2013	FIA Formula 3 European Championship	EuroInternational	3	0	0	0	0	0	NC†
2013	FIA Formula 3 European Championship	Carlin	3	0	0	0	0	0	NC†
2013	Eurocup Formula Renault 2.0	AVF	2	0	0	0	0	0	NC†
2014	Eurocup Formula Renault 2.0	Koiranen GP	10	0	0	0	0	20	18th
2014	FIA Formula 3 European Championship	ThreeBond with T-Sport	6	0	0	0	0	0	NC†
2014	Toyota Racing Series	Neale Motorsport	2	1	2	1	1	91	24th
2014	Formula Renault 2.0 Alps	China BRT by JCS	2	0	0	0	0	0	33rd
2014–15	Toyota Finance 86 Championship	Neale Motorsport	6	3	1	4	6	202	11th
2015	Japanese Formula 3 Championship	Petronas Team TOM'S	17	7	7	6	13	129	**1st**
2015	FIA Formula 3 European Championship	Prema Powerteam	6	0	0	0	2	43	16th
2015	Super GT - GT300	Team Up Garage with Bandoh	1	0	0	0	0	0	NC
2015	24H Series - SP3	Walkenhorst Motorsport							
2016	FIA Formula 3 European Championship	Prema Powerteam	30	1	1	1	8	254	4th
2016	Super GT - GT500	Lexus Team TOM'S	8	0	0	0	2	54	5th
2017	Super GT - GT500	Lexus Team KeePer TOM'S	8	2	1	0	4	84	**1st**
2017	Super Formula	Kondo Racing	7	0	1	0	1	7	10th
2018	Super GT - GT500	Lexus Team KeePer TOM'S	8	1	0	0	4	75	**2nd**
2018	Super Formula	Kondo Racing	6	1	1	1	4	37	**2nd**
2019	Super GT - GT500	Lexus Team KeePer TOM'S	8	1	0	1	4	83	**2nd**
2019	Deutsche Tourenwagen Masters	Lexus Team KeePer TOM'S	1	0	0	0	0	0	NC†
2019	Super Formula	Vantelin Team TOM'S	7	1	0	1	4	36	**1st**
2019	Blancpain GT Series Endurance Cup	HubAuto Corsa	1	0	0	0	0	0	NC
2019	Intercontinental GT Challenge	HubAuto Corsa	2	0	0	0	0	0	NC
2019	IMSA SportsCar Championship - GTD	AIM Vasser Sullivan	1	0	0	0	0	26	49th
2019–20	Asian Le Mans Series - LMP2	Eurasia Motorsport	3	0	1	1	0	13	9th
2019–20	Formula E	Envision Virgin Racing	Test driver						
2020	Super GT - GT500	TGR Team KeePer Tom's	6	1	1	1	1	46	8th
2020	Super Formula	Vantelin Team TOM'S	7	1	1	2	2	50	4th
2020–21	Formula E	Envision Virgin Racing	15	0	2	0	2	76	15th
2021	Deutsche Tourenwagen Masters	AlphaTauri AF Corse	2	0	0	1	0	11	16th
2021–22	Formula E	Envision Racing	16	1	2	4	2	68	11th
2022	Deutsche Tourenwagen Masters	AlphaTauri AF Corse	11	2	1	1	2	64	13th
2022	FIA World Endurance Championship - LMGTE Am	AF Corse	5	0	0	0	0	46	11th
2022	24 Hours of Le Mans - LMGTE Am	AF Corse	1	0	0	0	0	N/A	6th
2022–23	Formula E	Envision Racing	16	4	1	0	8	199	**2nd**
2023–24	Formula E	Jaguar TCS Racing	16	2	1	1	8	176	**3rd**
2024–25	Formula E	Jaguar TCS Racing	16	4	0	5	5	153	**2nd**
2025–26	Formula E	Citroën Racing Formula E Team	17	1	1	0	5	114	8th
2025–26	Asian Le Mans Series - LMP2	Inter Europol Competition	2	0	0	0	0	0	22nd
2026	IMSA SportsCar Championship - LMP2	Inter Europol Competition	1	0	0	0	1	325	33rd
2026	FIA World Endurance Championship - Hypercar	Peugeot TotalEnergies	8	0	0	0	0	10	21st
2026–27	Formula E	Citroën Racing Formula E Team	0	0	0	0	0	0	TBD

^{†} As Cassidy was a guest driver, he was ineligible to score championship points.
^{*} Season still in progress.

=== Complete Toyota Racing Series results ===
(key)

Year	Entrant	1	2	3	4	5	6	7	8	9	10	11	12	13	14	15	DC	Points
2011	Giles Motorsport	TER; 1; 9	**TER**; **2**; 2	TER; 3; 8	TIM; 1; 5	TIM; 2; 2	TIM; 3; 4	HMP; 1; 3	HMP; 2; 3	HMP; 3; 3	MAN; 1; 11	MAN; 2; 6	MAN; 3; 8	TAU; 1; 1	TAU; 2; 5	TAU; 3; 1	2nd	805
2012	Giles Motorsport	TER; 1; 8	TER; 2; 2	TER; 3; 2	TIM; 1; 1	TIM; 2; 1	TIM; 3; 3	TAU; 1; 5	TAU; 2; 1	TAU; 3; 8	MAN; 1; 3	MAN; 2; 5	MAN; 3; 1	HMP; 1; 3	HMP; 2; 5	HMP; 3; 1	1st	914
2013	M2 Competition	TER; 1; 2	TER; 2; 4	TER; 3; 8	TIM; 1; 2	TIM; 2; 3	TIM; 3; 7	TAU; 1; 2	TAU; 2; 4	TAU; 3; 2	HMP; 1; 4	HMP; 2; 1	HMP; 3; 3	MAN; 1; 2	MAN; 2; 2	MAN; 3; 1	1st	915
2014	Neale Motorsport	TER; 1	TER; 2	TER; 3	TIM; 1	TIM; 2	TIM; 3	HIG; 1	HIG; 2	HIG; 3	HMP; 1	HMP; 2	HMP; 3	**MAN**; **1** DNS	MAN; 2; 18	**MAN**; **3**; 1	NC	0

=== Complete New Zealand Grand Prix results ===
Year	Team	Car	Qualifying	Main race
2011	(New Zealand) Giles Motorsport	Tatuus FT-50 - Toyota	2nd	8th
2012	(New Zealand) Giles Motorsport	Tatuus FT-50 - Toyota	2nd	**1st**
2013	(New Zealand) M2 Competition	Tatuus FT-50 - Toyota	4th	**1st**
2014	(New Zealand) M2 Competition	Tatuus FT-50 - Toyota	1st	**1st**

=== Complete Eurocup Formula Renault 2.0 results ===
(key)

Year	Entrant	1	2	3	4	5	6	7	8	9	10	11	12	13	14	DC	Points
2012	Fortec Motorsports	ALC; 1 Ret	ALC; 2; 6	SPA; 1 Ret	SPA; 2 DNS	NÜR; 1; 17	NÜR; 2; 11	MSC; 1	MSC; 2	HUN; 1	HUN; 2	LEC; 1	LEC; 2	CAT; 1	CAT; 2	24th	8
2013	AV Formula	ALC; 1; 31	ALC; 2; 31	SPA; 1	SPA; 2	MSC; 1	MSC; 2	RBR; 1	RBR; 2	HUN; 1	HUN; 2	LEC; 1	LEC; 2	CAT; 1	CAT; 2	NC	0
2014	Koiranen GP	ALC; 1; 14	ALC; 2; 11	SPA; 1; 12	SPA; 2; 17	MSC; 1; 25	MSC; 2; 25	NÜR; 1; 8	NÜR; 2; 5	HUN; 1; 10	HUN; 2 Ret	LEC; 1	LEC; 2	JER; 1	JER; 2	18th	20

=== Complete FIA Formula 3 European Championship results ===
(key)

Year	Entrant	Engine	1	2	3	4	5	6	7	8	9	10	11	12	13	14	15	16	17	18	19	20	21	22	23	24	25	26	27	28	29	30	31	32	33	DC	Points
2013	EuroInternational	Mercedes	MNZ; 1	MNZ; 2	MNZ; 3	SIL; 1	SIL; 2	SIL; 3	HOC; 1	HOC; 2	HOC; 3	BRH; 1	BRH; 2	BRH; 3	RBR; 1	RBR; 2	RBR; 3	NOR; 1; 16	NOR; 2; 11	NOR; 3; 11	NÜR; 1	NÜR; 2	NÜR; 3	ZAN; 1	ZAN; 2	ZAN; 3	VAL; 1	VAL; 2	VAL; 3							NC†	0†
2013	Carlin	Volkswagen																												HOC; 1; 24	HOC; 2; 21	HOC; 3; 16				NC†	0†
2014	ThreeBond with T-Sport	NBE	SIL; 1	SIL; 2	SIL; 3	HOC; 1	HOC; 2	HOC; 3	PAU; 1	PAU; 2	PAU; 3	HUN; 1	HUN; 2	HUN; 3	SPA; 1	SPA; 2	SPA; 3	NOR; 1	NOR; 2	NOR; 3	MSC; 1	MSC; 2	MSC; 3	RBR; 1	RBR; 2	RBR; 3	NÜR; 1	NÜR; 2	NÜR; 3	IMO; 1; 11	IMO; 2; 12	IMO; 3; 22	HOC; 1; 16	HOC; 2; 19	HOC; 3; 18	NC†	0†
2015	Prema Powerteam	Mercedes	SIL; 1	SIL; 2	SIL; 3	HOC; 1	HOC; 2	HOC; 3	PAU; 1	PAU; 2	PAU; 3	MNZ; 1	MNZ; 2	MNZ; 3	SPA; 1	SPA; 2	SPA; 3	NOR; 1	NOR; 2	NOR; 3	RBR; 1	RBR; 2	RBR; 3	ZAN; 1	ZAN; 2	ZAN; 3	ALG; 1; 32	ALG; 2 Ret	ALG; 3; 9	NÜR; 1; 2	NÜR; 2; 6	NÜR; 3; 3	HOC; 1	HOC; 2	HOC; 3	16th	43
2016	Prema Powerteam	Mercedes	LEC; 1; 2	LEC; 2; 2	LEC; 3; 2	HUN; 1 Ret	HUN; 2; 16	HUN; 3; 9	PAU; 1; 2	PAU; 2; 16	PAU; 3 Ret	RBR; 1; 6	RBR; 2 Ret	RBR; 3; 10	NOR; 1; 6	NOR; 2; 4	NOR; 3; 6	**ZAN**; **1**; 2	ZAN; 2; 1	ZAN; 3; 2	SPA; 1; 4	SPA; 2; 17	SPA; 3; 5	NÜR; 1; 4	NÜR; 2 Ret	NÜR; 3; 5	IMO; 1; 10	IMO; 2; 7	IMO; 3; 8	HOC; 1; 3	HOC; 2 Ret	HOC; 3; 4				4th	254

^{†} As Cassidy was a guest driver, he was ineligible to score championship points.

=== Complete Macau Grand Prix results ===
Year	Team	Qualifying	Quali Race	Main race
2014	(United Kingdom) ThreeBond with T-Sport	7th	5th	**3rd**
2015	(Japan) TOM'S	24th	17th	12th
2016	(Italy) Prema Powerteam	10th	11th	DNF

=== Complete Japanese Formula 3 Championship results ===
(key) (Races in bold indicate pole position) (Races in italics indicate fastest lap)

Year	Team	Engine	1	2	3	4	5	6	7	8	9	10	11	12	13	14	15	16	17	DC	Pts
2015	Petronas Team TOM'S	Toyota	**SUZ**; **1**; 10	**SUZ**; **2**; 1	MOT; 1; 1	MOT; 2; 3	MOT; 3; 3	**OKA**; **1**; 1	OKA; 2; 2	FUJ; 1; 2	**FUJ**; **2**; 1	OKA; 1; 5	OKA; 2; 4	**FUJ**; **1**; 1	FUJ; 2; 2	MOT; 1; 2	MOT; 2; 5	**SUG**; **1**; 1	**SUG**; **2**; 1	1st	129

=== Complete Super GT results ===
(key) (Races in bold indicate pole position) (Races in italics indicate fastest lap)

Year	Team	Car	Class	1	2	3	4	5	6	7	8	DC	Points
2015	Team Up Garage with Bandoh	Toyota 86	GT300	OKA	FUJ	CHA	FUJ	SUZ; 21	SUG	AUT	MOT	NC	0
2016	Lexus Team TOM'S	Lexus RC F	GT500	OKA; 8	FUJ; 4	SUG; 11	FUJ; 5	SUZ; 2	CHA; 11	MOT; 3	MOT; 4	5th	54
2017	Lexus Team KeePer TOM'S	Lexus LC 500	GT500	OKA; 1	FUJ; 3	AUT; 6	SUG; 10	FUJ; 6	SUZ; 6	**CHA**; 1	MOT; 2	1st	84
2018	Lexus Team KeePer TOM'S	Lexus LC 500	GT500	OKA; 3	FUJ; 7	SUZ; 3	CHA; 8	FUJ; 2	SUG; 14	AUT; 1	MOT; 4	2nd	75
2019	Lexus Team KeePer TOM'S	Lexus LC 500	GT500	OKA; 12	FUJ; 7	SUZ; 2	CHA; 2	FUJ; 4	AUT; 3	SUG; 4	MOT; 1	2nd	83
2020	TGR Team KeePer TOM'S	Toyota GR Supra GT500	GT500	**FUJ**; 1	FUJ; 4	SUZ; 7	MOT; 6	FUJ; 4	SUZ; Ret	MOT	FUJ	8th	46

=== Complete Super Formula results ===
(key) (Races in bold indicate pole position) (Races in italics indicate fastest lap)

Year	Team	Engine	1	2	3	4	5	6	7	8	9	DC	Points
2017	Kondo Racing	Toyota	SUZ; 17	OKA; 3	OKA; 11	FUJ; Ret	MOT; 5	AUT; Ret	**SUG**; 19	SUZ; C	SUZ; C	10th	7
2018	Kondo Racing	Toyota	SUZ; 7	AUT; C	SUG; 2	**FUJ**; 1	MOT; 3	OKA; 5‡	SUZ; 2			2nd	37
2019	Vantelin Team TOM'S	Toyota	SUZ; 1	AUT; 8	SUG; 4	FUJ; 3	MOT; 3	OKA; 10	SUZ; 2			1st	36
2020	Vantelin Team TOM'S	Toyota	MOT; 6	OKA; 3	SUG; 1	AUT; 7	SUZ; 5	**SUZ**; Ret^{1}	FUJ; 4			4th	50

^{‡} Half points awarded as less than 75% of race distance was completed.

=== Complete IMSA SportsCar Championship results ===
(key) (Races in bold indicate pole position; results in italics indicate fastest lap)

Year	Entrant	Class	Make	Engine	1	2	3	4	5	6	7	8	9	10	11	Rank	Points	Ref
2019	AIM Vasser Sullivan	GTD	Lexus RC F GT3	Lexus 5.0 L V8	DAY; 5	SEB	MDO	DET	WGL	MOS	LIM	ELK	VIR	LGA	PET	49th	26	
2026	Inter Europol Competition	LMP2	Oreca 07	Gibson GK428 4.2 L V8	DAY; 3	SEB	WGL	MOS	ELK	IMS	PET					33rd	325	

=== Complete Deutsche Tourenwagen Masters results ===
(key) (Races in bold indicate pole position) (Races in italics indicate fastest lap)

Year	Team	Car	1	2	3	4	5	6	7	8	9	10	11	12	13	14	15	16	17	18	Pos	Points
2019	Lexus Team KeePer TOM'S	Lexus LC500 GT500	HOC; 1	HOC; 2	ZOL; 1	ZOL; 2	MIS; 1	MIS; 2	NOR; 1	NOR; 2	ASS; 1	ASS; 2	BRH; 1	BRH; 2	LAU; 1	LAU; 2	NÜR; 1	NÜR; 2	HOC; 1	HOC; 2 Ret	NC†	0†
2021	AlphaTauri AF Corse	Ferrari 488 GT3 Evo 2020	MNZ; 1	MNZ; 2	LAU; 1	LAU; 2	ZOL; 1	ZOL; 2	NÜR; 1	NÜR; 2	RBR; 1	RBR; 2	ASS; 1	ASS; 2	HOC; 1	HOC; 2	NOR; 1; 5	NOR; 2; 13^{3}			16th	11
2022	AlphaTauri AF Corse	Ferrari 488 GT3 Evo 2020	ALG; 1	ALG; 2	LAU; 1; 9	LAU; 2; 23	IMO; 1; 14	IMO; 2; 17	NOR; 1	NOR; 2	NÜR; 1; 7	NÜR; 2 Ret	SPA; 1; 10	SPA; 2; 1^{3}	**RBR**; **1**; 1^{2}	RBR; 2; 18^{3}	HOC; 1 Ret	HOC; 2 DNS			13th	64

^{†} As Cassidy was a guest driver, he was ineligible to score championship points.

=== Complete Formula E results ===
(key) (Races in bold indicate pole position; races in italics indicate fastest lap)

Year	Team	Chassis	Powertrain	1	2	3	4	5	6	7	8	9	10	11	12	13	14	15	16	17	Pos	Points
2020–21	Envision Virgin Racing	Spark SRT05e	Audi e-tron FE07	DIR; 19	DIR; 14	RME; 15	**RME**; Ret	VLC; 4	VLC; 13	MCO; 8	PUE; Ret	PUE; 2	**NYC**; 4	NYC; 2	LDN; 11	LDN; 7	BER; 14	BER; 17			15th	76
2021–22	Envision Racing	Spark SRT05e	Audi e-tron FE07	DRH; 7	DRH; 16	MEX; 13	RME; 9	RME; Ret	MCO; 7	BER; Ret	BER; 21	JAK; 16	MRK; 13	**NYC**; 1	**NYC**; 15	LDN; 3	LDN; Ret	SEO; 10	SEO; 8		11th	68
2022–23	Envision Racing	Formula E Gen3	Jaguar I-Type 6	MEX; 9	DRH; 6	DRH; 13	HYD; 2	CAP; 3	SAP; 2	BER; 5	BER; 1	MCO; 1	JAK; 7	JAK; 18	POR; 1	RME; 2	RME; 14	LDN; Ret	**LDN**; 1		2nd	199
2023–24	Jaguar TCS Racing	Formula E Gen3	Jaguar I-Type 6	MEX; 3	DRH; 3	DRH; 1	SAP; Ret	TOK; 8	MIS; Ret	MIS; 3	MCO; 2	BER; 1	BER; 2	SHA; 3	SHA; 4	POR; 19	POR; 13	LDN; 7	**LDN**; Ret		3rd	176
2024–25	Jaguar TCS Racing	Formula E Gen3 Evo	Jaguar I-Type 7	SAO; Ret	MEX; 12	JED; 11	JED; 5	MIA; 15	MCO; 18	MCO; 3	TKO; 10	TKO; 7	SHA; 21	**SHA**; 1	JKT; 6	BER; 5	BER; 1	LDN; 1	LDN; 1		2nd	156
2025–26	Citroën Racing	Formula E Gen3 Evo	Citroën ë-CX	SAO; 3	MEX; 1	MIA; 16	JED; 6	JED; 14	**MAD**; 17	BER; 2	BER; Ret	MCO; 9	MCO; 18	SAN; Ret	SHA; 19	SHA; 15	TKO; 3	TKO; 2	LDN; 9	LDN; 6	8th	114

^{*} Season still in progress.

=== Complete FIA World Endurance Championship results ===
(key) (Races in bold indicate pole position; races in italics indicate fastest lap)

Year	Entrant	Class	Car	Engine	1	2	3	4	5	6	7	8	Rank	Points
2022	AF Corse	LMGTE Am	Ferrari 488 GTE Evo	Ferrari F154CB 3.9 L Turbo V8	SEB; 9	SPA; 4	LMS; 5	MNZ; 9	FUJ	BHR; 7			11th	46
2026	Peugeot TotalEnergies	Hypercar	Peugeot 9X8	Peugeot X6H 2.6 L Turbo V6	IMO; 16	SPA; 7	LMS; 11	SÃO; 16	COA; 16	FUJ; Ret	CAT; 12	MNZ; 8	21st	10

=== Complete 24 Hours of Le Mans results ===
Year	Team	Co-Drivers	Car	Class	Laps	Pos.	Class Pos.
2022	(Italy) AF Corse	(Italy) Francesco Castellacci (Switzerland) Thomas Flohr	Ferrari 488 GTE Evo	GTE; Am	340	39th	6th
2026	(France) Peugeot TotalEnergies	(United Kingdom) Paul di Resta (Belgium) Stoffel Vandoorne	Peugeot 9X8	Hypercar	376	12th	12th

=== Complete Asian Le Mans Series results ===
(key) (Races in bold indicate pole position) (Races in italics indicate fastest lap)

Year	Team	Class	Car	Engine	1	2	3	4	5	6	Pos.	Points
2025–26	Inter Europol Competition	LMP2	Oreca 07	Gibson GK428 4.2 L V8	SEP; 1; 14	SEP; 2; 12	DUB; 1	DUB; 2	ABU; 1	ABU; 2	22nd	0

Sporting positions
Preceded by Mitch Evans	Toyota Racing Series; Champion; 2012–2013	Succeeded by Andrew Tang
Preceded by Mitch Evans	New Zealand Grand Prix; Winner; 2012–2014	Succeeded by Lance Stroll
Preceded by Nobuharu Matsushita	Japanese Formula 3 Championship; Champion; 2015	Succeeded by Kenta Yamashita
Preceded by Heikki Kovalainen; Kohei Hirate	Super GT; GT500 Champion; 2017; With: Ryō Hirakawa	Succeeded by Jenson Button; Naoki Yamamoto
Preceded by Naoki Yamamoto	Super Formula; Champion; 2019	Succeeded by Naoki Yamamoto
