= 2012 Toyota Racing Series =

Motor racing competition

The 2012 Toyota Racing Series was the eighth running of the Toyota Racing Series, the premier open-wheeler motorsport category held in New Zealand. The 15-race competition was won by Nick Cassidy.

== Teams and drivers ==
The series announced a 20-driver entry list on 28 December 2011.

Team	No.	Driver	Rounds
Giles Motorsport	1	(New Zealand) Mitch Evans	4–5
Giles Motorsport	2	(New Zealand) Nick Cassidy	All
Giles Motorsport	5	(Brazil) Bruno Bonifacio	All
Giles Motorsport	6	(Puerto Rico) Félix Serrallés	All
Giles Motorsport	15	(Austria) Lucas Auer	All
Giles Motorsport	16	(Netherlands) Hannes van Asseldonk	All
Victory Motor Racing	4	(New Zealand) Chris Vlok	All
Victory Motor Racing	20	(Russia) Dmitry Suranovich	All
Victory Motor Racing	87	(New Zealand) Damon Leitch	All
Victory Motor Racing	88	(Italy) Michela Cerruti	All
ETEC Motorsport	7	(New Zealand) Jono Lester	All
ETEC Motorsport	8	(Malaysia) Melvin Moh	All
ETEC Motorsport	9	(France) Victor Sendin	1–3
ETEC Motorsport	9	(New Zealand) Ken Smith	5
ETEC Motorsport	10	(United Kingdom) Josh Hill	All
ETEC Motorsport	11	(India) Shahaan Engineer	All
M2 Competition	42	(United Kingdom) Jordan King	All
M2 Competition	43	(Thailand) Tanart Sathienthirakul	All
M2 Competition	51	(India) Sheban Siddiqi	All
M2 Competition	52	(France) Nathanaël Berthon	All
M2 Competition	53	(Italy) Raffaele Marciello	All

== Calendar ==
The calendar for the series was announced on 11 July 2011, and was held over five successive weekends in January and February.

Round		Date	Circuit/Location
1	Race 1	14 January	(New Zealand) Teretonga Park, Invercargill
1	Race 2	15 January	(New Zealand) Teretonga Park, Invercargill
1	Race 3	15 January	(New Zealand) Teretonga Park, Invercargill
2	Race 1	21 January	(New Zealand) Timaru International Motor Raceway, Timaru
2	Race 2	22 January	(New Zealand) Timaru International Motor Raceway, Timaru
2	Race 3	22 January	(New Zealand) Timaru International Motor Raceway, Timaru
3	Race 1	28 January	(New Zealand) Taupo Motorsport Park, Taupō
3	Race 2	29 January	(New Zealand) Taupo Motorsport Park, Taupō
3	Race 3	29 January	(New Zealand) Taupo Motorsport Park, Taupō
4	Race 1	4 February	(New Zealand) Hampton Downs Motorsport Park, Waikato
4	Race 2	5 February	(New Zealand) Hampton Downs Motorsport Park, Waikato
4	Race 3	5 February	(New Zealand) Hampton Downs Motorsport Park, Waikato
5	Race 1	11 February	(New Zealand) Manfeild Autocourse, Feilding
5	Race 2	12 February	(New Zealand) Manfeild Autocourse, Feilding
5	Race 3	12 February	(New Zealand) Manfeild Autocourse, Feilding

== Results ==
Round		Circuit	Pole position	Fastest lap	Winning driver	Winning team	Round winner
1	R1	(New Zealand) Teretonga Park	(Austria) Lucas Auer	(New Zealand) Damon Leitch	(United Kingdom) Josh Hill	ETEC Motorsport	(New Zealand) Damon Leitch
1	R2	(New Zealand) Teretonga Park	(Austria) Lucas Auer	(New Zealand) Nick Cassidy	(Netherlands) Hannes van Asseldonk	Giles Motorsport	(New Zealand) Damon Leitch
1	R3	(New Zealand) Teretonga Park		(Netherlands) Hannes van Asseldonk	(Netherlands) Hannes van Asseldonk	Giles Motorsport	(New Zealand) Damon Leitch
2	R1	(New Zealand) Timaru International Motor Raceway	(Netherlands) Hannes van Asseldonk	(New Zealand) Damon Leitch	(New Zealand) Nick Cassidy	Giles Motorsport	(New Zealand) Nick Cassidy
2	R2	(New Zealand) Timaru International Motor Raceway	(Netherlands) Hannes van Asseldonk	(New Zealand) Damon Leitch	(New Zealand) Nick Cassidy	Giles Motorsport	(New Zealand) Nick Cassidy
2	R3	(New Zealand) Timaru International Motor Raceway		(Italy) Raffaele Marciello	(New Zealand) Damon Leitch	Victory Motor Racing	(New Zealand) Nick Cassidy
3	R1	(New Zealand) Taupo Motorsport Park	(United Kingdom) Jordan King	(United Kingdom) Jordan King	(United Kingdom) Jordan King	M2 Competition	(United Kingdom) Jordan King
3	R2	(New Zealand) Taupo Motorsport Park	(United Kingdom) Josh Hill	(New Zealand) Nick Cassidy	(New Zealand) Nick Cassidy	Giles Motorsport	(United Kingdom) Jordan King
3	R3	(New Zealand) Taupo Motorsport Park		(Netherlands) Hannes van Asseldonk	(Netherlands) Hannes van Asseldonk	Giles Motorsport	(United Kingdom) Jordan King
4	R1	(New Zealand) Hampton Downs Motorsport Park	(New Zealand) Mitch Evans	(Netherlands) Hannes van Asseldonk	(New Zealand) Mitch Evans	Giles Motorsport	(New Zealand) Nick Cassidy
4	R2	(New Zealand) Hampton Downs Motorsport Park	(New Zealand) Mitch Evans	(Italy) Raffaele Marciello	(Italy) Raffaele Marciello	M2 Competition	(New Zealand) Nick Cassidy
4	R3	(New Zealand) Hampton Downs Motorsport Park		(New Zealand) Nick Cassidy	(New Zealand) Nick Cassidy	Giles Motorsport	(New Zealand) Nick Cassidy
5	R1	(New Zealand) Manfeild Autocourse	(New Zealand) Mitch Evans	(New Zealand) Mitch Evans	(New Zealand) Mitch Evans	Giles Motorsport	(New Zealand) Nick Cassidy
5	R2	(New Zealand) Manfeild Autocourse		(New Zealand) Mitch Evans	(Puerto Rico) Félix Serrallés	Giles Motorsport	(New Zealand) Nick Cassidy
5	R3	(New Zealand) Manfeild Autocourse	(New Zealand) Mitch Evans	(New Zealand) Mitch Evans	(New Zealand) Nick Cassidy	Giles Motorsport	(New Zealand) Nick Cassidy

== Championship standings ==
=== Scoring system ===
Position	1st	2nd	3rd	4th	5th	6th	7th	8th	9th	10th	11th	12th	13th	14th	15th	16th	17th	18th	19th	20th	21st	22nd	23rd	24th	25th	26th	27th	28th	29th	30th
Points	75	67	60	54	49	45	42	39	36	33	30	28	26	24	22	20	18	16	14	12	10	9	8	7	6	5	4	3	2	1

=== Drivers' Championship ===
Pos	Driver	TER			TIM			TAU			HMP			MAN			Points
1	(New Zealand) Nick Cassidy	8	2	2	1	1	3	5	1	8	3	5	1	3	5	1	914
2	(Netherlands) Hannes van Asseldonk	Ret	1	1	**5**	**13**	19	3	5	1	2	4	3	2	Ret	2	738
3	(New Zealand) Damon Leitch	2	4	3	2	5	1	6	2	10	12	13	Ret	19	12	16	633
4	(United Kingdom) Josh Hill	1	13	6	3	7	18	2	**13**	2	7	Ret	4	5	3	Ret	629
5	(United Kingdom) Jordan King	Ret	Ret	10	7	3	6	**1**	4	3	6	3	7	8	9	Ret	591
6	(Austria) Lucas Auer	**Ret**	**Ret**	14	6	15	14	7	6	5	4	2	5	4	4	3	589
7	(France) Nathanaël Berthon	4	11	8	9	16	8	8	8	6	8	Ret	6	9	6	5	555
8	(Puerto Rico) Félix Serrallés	6	7	4	4	2	10	9	Ret	4	DNS	DNS	DNS	6	1	7	547
9	(Italy) Raffaele Marciello	Ret	5	NC	10	9	5	4	3	18	5	1	8	10	7	Ret	535
10	(Brazil) Bruno Bonifacio	9	3	7	Ret	11	11	10	7	7	9	8	Ret	7	8	4	525
11	(New Zealand) Jono Lester	3	Ret	11	8	4	4	11	9	9	10	6	15	Ret	11	6	514
12	(Russia) Dmitry Suranovich	5	15	15	12	6	2	12	12	11	11	Ret	Ret	12	14	8	440
13	(India) Shahaan Engineer	11	6	NC	11	12	16	13	10	12	13	7	13	14	13	15	406
14	(Thailand) Tanart Sathienthirakul	13	9	12	15	Ret	13	14	11	14	15	9	9	16	16	10	383
15	(New Zealand) Chris Vlok	12	14	9	16	Ret	12	16	14	15	17	11	12	11	10	11	371
16	(Italy) Michela Cerruti	10	10	13	17	14	15	15	16	17	18	10	11	15	15	12	367
17	(Malaysia) Melvin Moh	Ret	8	17	14	10	7	Ret	Ret	16	14	12	10	13	DNS	9	323
18	(France) Victor Sendin	7	12	5	13	8	9	17	15	13							286
19	(New Zealand) Mitch Evans										**1**	**Ret**	2	**1**	2	**Ret**	284
20	(India) Sheban Siddiqi	14	Ret	16	18	17	17	18	Ret	Ret	16	Ret	14	18	18	14	212
21	(New Zealand) Ken Smith													17	17	13	62
Pos	Driver	TER			TIM			TAU			HMP			MAN			Points

Colour	Result
Gold	Winner
Silver	Second place
Bronze	Third place
Green	Points classification
Blue	Non-points classification
Blue	Non-classified finish (NC)
Purple	Retired, not classified (Ret)
Red	Did not qualify (DNQ)
Red	Did not pre-qualify (DNPQ)
Black	Disqualified (DSQ)
White	Did not start (DNS)
White	Withdrew (WD)
White	Race cancelled (C)
Blank	Did not practice (DNP)
Blank	Did not arrive (DNA)
Blank	Excluded (EX)

**Bold** – Pole
**R** - Rookie
