= 2014 Toyota Racing Series =

Motor racing competition

Seasons
- ← 2013 2015 →

The 2014 Toyota Racing Series was the tenth running of the Toyota Racing Series, the premier open-wheeler motorsport category held in New Zealand. The series, which consists of five meetings of three races, began on 11 January at Teretonga Park in Invercargill and ended on 9 February with the 59th running of the New Zealand Grand Prix, at Manfeild Autocourse in Feilding.

== Teams and drivers ==
All teams are New-Zealand registered.

Team	No.	Driver	Status	Rounds
Neale Motorsport	1	(New Zealand) Nick Cassidy		5
Neale Motorsport	22	(Singapore) Andrew Tang		All
Neale Motorsport	40	(New Zealand) James Munro	R	All
Giles Motorsport	4	(United States) Ryan Tveter	R	All
Giles Motorsport	7	(United Kingdom) Matt Rao	R	All
Giles Motorsport	23	(United Kingdom) Jann Mardenborough		All
Giles Motorsport	25	(Italy) Matteo Ferrer	R	All
Giles Motorsport	66	(Estonia) Martin Rump	R	All
Giles Motorsport	72	(Malaysia) Alif Hamdan	R	All
M2 Competition	5	(Brazil) Gustavo Lima	R	All
M2 Competition	12	(Brazil) Pedro Piquet	R	1–3
M2 Competition	14	(Australia) Macauley Jones	R	All
M2 Competition	21	(Netherlands) Steijn Schothorst		All
M2 Competition	55	(Russia) Egor Orudzhev	R	All
M2 Competition	56	(Switzerland) Levin Amweg	R	All
ETEC Motorsport	16	(Russia) Matevos Isaakyan	R	All
ETEC Motorsport	17	(Australia) Jordan Oon	R	All
ETEC Motorsport	26	(Russia) Denis Korneev	R	All
ETEC Motorsport	27	(Croatia) Martin Kodrić	R	All
Victory Motor Racing	41	(Sweden) Robin Hansson	R	All
Victory Motor Racing	42	(United States) Neil Alberico	R	All
Victory Motor Racing	53	(New Zealand) Michael Scott		All
Victory Motor Racing	87	(New Zealand) Damon Leitch		All
Victory Motor Racing	88	(New Zealand) Brendon Leitch	R	All

== Race calendar and results ==
The calendar for the series was announced on 4 July 2013, and will be held over five successive weekends in January and February. The series will visit Highlands Motorsport Park for the first time. The Highlands round will be supporting the V8SuperTourer series, whereas the Teretonga and Timaru rounds will be supporting the New Zealand V8s. Both touring car championships will be part of the New Zealand Grand Prix meeting at Manfeild.

Round		Date	Circuit	Pole position	Fastest lap	Winning driver	Winning team	Round winner(s)
1	R1	11 January	Teretonga Park, Invercargill	(Netherlands) Steijn Schothorst	(Netherlands) Steijn Schothorst	(Russia) Egor Orudzhev	M2 Competition	(Estonia) Martin Rump
1	R2	12 January	Teretonga Park, Invercargill		(Singapore) Andrew Tang	(Singapore) Andrew Tang	Neale Motorsport	(Estonia) Martin Rump
1	R3	12 January	Teretonga Park, Invercargill	(Russia) Egor Orudzhev	(New Zealand) Michael Scott	(Russia) Egor Orudzhev	M2 Competition	(Estonia) Martin Rump
2	R1	18 January	Timaru International Motor Raceway, Timaru	(New Zealand) James Munro	(Russia) Egor Orudzhev	(New Zealand) James Munro	Neale Motorsport	(United Kingdom) Jann Mardenborough
2	R2	19 January	Timaru International Motor Raceway, Timaru		(United Kingdom) Jann Mardenborough	(United Kingdom) Jann Mardenborough	Giles Motorsport	(United Kingdom) Jann Mardenborough
2	R3	19 January	Timaru International Motor Raceway, Timaru	(Estonia) Martin Rump	(Estonia) Martin Rump	(Singapore) Andrew Tang	Neale Motorsport	(United Kingdom) Jann Mardenborough
3	R1	25 January	Highlands Motorsport Park, Cromwell	(Singapore) Andrew Tang	(Singapore) Andrew Tang	(Estonia) Martin Rump	Giles Motorsport	(Singapore) Andrew Tang
3	R2	26 January	Highlands Motorsport Park, Cromwell		(Singapore) Andrew Tang	(Russia) Egor Orudzhev	M2 Competition	(Singapore) Andrew Tang
3	R3	26 January	Highlands Motorsport Park, Cromwell	(Estonia) Martin Rump	(Singapore) Andrew Tang	(United Kingdom) Jann Mardenborough	Giles Motorsport	(Singapore) Andrew Tang
4	R1	1 February	Hampton Downs Motorsport Park, Waikato	(United Kingdom) Jann Mardenborough	(United Kingdom) Jann Mardenborough	(United Kingdom) Jann Mardenborough	Giles Motorsport	(Singapore) Andrew Tang
4	R2	2 February	Hampton Downs Motorsport Park, Waikato		(New Zealand) Damon Leitch	(Netherlands) Steijn Schothorst	M2 Competition	(Singapore) Andrew Tang
4	R3	2 February	Hampton Downs Motorsport Park, Waikato	(Estonia) Martin Rump	(Estonia) Martin Rump	(Estonia) Martin Rump	Giles Motorsport	(Singapore) Andrew Tang
5	R1	8 February	Manfeild Autocourse, Feilding	(New Zealand) Nick Cassidy	(Singapore) Andrew Tang	(Singapore) Andrew Tang	Neale Motorsport	(Netherlands) Steijn Schothorst
5	R2	9 February	Manfeild Autocourse, Feilding		(New Zealand) Nick Cassidy	(Netherlands) Steijn Schothorst	M2 Competition	(Netherlands) Steijn Schothorst
5	R3	9 February	Manfeild Autocourse, Feilding	(New Zealand) Nick Cassidy	(Estonia) Martin Rump	(New Zealand) Nick Cassidy	Neale Motorsport	(Netherlands) Steijn Schothorst

== Championship standings ==
In order for a driver to score championship points, they had to complete at least 75% of the race winner's distance. All races counted towards the final championship standings.

Scoring system

Position	1st	2nd	3rd	4th	5th	6th	7th	8th	9th	10th	11th	12th	13th	14th	15th	16th	17th	18th	19th	20th	21st	22nd	23rd
Points	75	67	60	54	49	45	42	39	36	33	30	28	26	24	22	20	18	16	14	12	10	9	8

=== Drivers' Championship ===
Pos	Driver	TER			TIM			HIG			HMP			MAN			Points
1	(Singapore) Andrew Tang	7	1	Ret	Ret	10	1	**2**	3	2	2	4	2	1	6	3	794
2	(United Kingdom) Jann Mardenborough	6	2	12	8	1	2	Ret	7	1	**1**	9	4	6	2	2	790
3	(New Zealand) Damon Leitch	NC	15	2	4	4	7	4	2	3	6	2	5	2	3	Ret	708
4	(Netherlands) Steijn Schothorst	**18**	4	3	2	12	6	Ret	Ret	Ret	4	1	7	4	1	4	630
5	(Estonia) Martin Rump	2	3	8	7	2	**4**	1	9	**DNS**	21	13	**1**	19	9	13	629
6	(Russia) Egor Orudzhev	1	Ret	**1**	3	3	20	5	1	Ret	3	3	3	22	Ret	Ret	595
7	(New Zealand) James Munro	11	7	Ret	**1**	18	3	6	5	5	8	15	8	17	5	5	587
8	(Russia) Denis Korneev	5	5	9	Ret	19	8	Ret	13	11	9	6	19	21	14	7	417
9	(United States) Neil Alberico	10	9	14	5	5	17	10	Ret	8	13	14	NC	14	11	14	411
10	(Russia) Matevos Isaakyan	8	8	6	12	13	19	7	Ret	13	10	8	10	16	13	Ret	410
11	(Switzerland) Levin Amweg	20	14	4	Ret	6	12	15	4	Ret	19	12	11	5	Ret	6	409
12	(Brazil) Gustavo Lima	12	17	16	11	17	18	8	14	4	11	11	Ret	8	16	9	405
13	(Australia) Jordan Oon	3	6	19	14	7	16	11	11	Ret	16	18	15	11	7	Ret	395
14	(United Kingdom) Matt Rao	14	20	15	10	Ret	13	14	8	12	5	10	9	18	19	10	394
15	(New Zealand) Michael Scott	4	19	7	Ret	Ret	9	13	12	7	18	20	13	12	8	12	393
16	(New Zealand) Brendon Leitch	13	16	10	6	15	10	9	Ret	9	14	17	17	15	Ret	11	366
17	(United States) Ryan Tveter	19	10	11	9	9	5	3	Ret	NC	20	19	Ret	3	Ret	Ret	344
18	(Australia) Macauley Jones	17	Ret	5	Ret	14	NC	16	Ret	14	12	7	6	9	4	Ret	340
19	(Sweden) Robin Hansson	16	Ret	Ret	16	8	11	Ret	6	Ret	7	5	14	10	17	DNS	320
20	(Italy) Matteo Ferrer	9	11	Ret	DSQ	DSQ	EX	Ret	10	6	15	16	12	7	10	Ret	289
21	(Malaysia) Alif Hamdan	Ret	18	18	13	Ret	15	12	15	10	17	22	18	20	15	Ret	240
22	(Croatia) Martin Kodrić	Ret	12	17	Ret	11	Ret	NC	Ret	DNS	22	21	16	13	12	8	211
23	(Brazil) Pedro Piquet	15	13	13	15	16	14	DNS	DNS	DNS							140
24	(New Zealand) Nick Cassidy													**DNS**	18	**1**	0
Pos	Driver	TER			TIM			HIG			HMP			MAN			Points

Colour	Result
Gold	Winner
Silver	Second place
Bronze	Third place
Green	Points classification
Blue	Non-points classification
Blue	Non-classified finish (NC)
Purple	Retired, not classified (Ret)
Red	Did not qualify (DNQ)
Red	Did not pre-qualify (DNPQ)
Black	Disqualified (DSQ)
White	Did not start (DNS)
White	Withdrew (WD)
White	Race cancelled (C)
Blank	Did not practice (DNP)
Blank	Did not arrive (DNA)
Blank	Excluded (EX)

**Bold** – Pole
Italics – Fastest Lap

=== Teams' Championship ===
Pos	Team	No.	TER			TIM			HIG			HMP			MAN			Points
1	Giles Motorsport 1	23	6	2	12	8	1	2	Ret	7	1	**1**	9	4	6	2	2	1409
1	Giles Motorsport 1	66	2	3	8	7	2	**4**	1	9	**DNS**	21	13	**1**	19	9	13	1409
2	Neale Motorsport 1	22	7	1	Ret	Ret	9	1	**2**	3	2	2	4	2	1	6	3	1372
2	Neale Motorsport 1	40	11	7	Ret	**1**	18	3	6	5	5	8	15	8	17	5	5	1372
3	M2 Competition 1	21	**18**	4	3	2	11	6	Ret	Ret	Ret	4	1	7	4	1	4	1221
3	M2 Competition 1	55	1	Ret	**1**	3	3	20	5	1	Ret	3	3	3	22	Ret	DNS	1221
4	Victory Motor Racing 1	41	16	Ret	Ret	16	7	11	Ret	6	Ret	7	5	14	10	17	DNS	1031
4	Victory Motor Racing 1	87	NC	15	2	4	4	7	4	2	3	6	2	5	2	3	Ret	1031
5	ETEC Motorsport 1	17	3	6	19	14	6	16	11	11	Ret	16	18	15	11	7	Ret	812
5	ETEC Motorsport 1	26	5	5	9	Ret	19	8	Ret	13	11	9	6	19	21	14	7	812
6	Victory Motor Racing 2	42	10	9	14	5	17	17	10	Ret	8	13	14	NC	14	11	14	769
6	Victory Motor Racing 2	53	4	19	7	Ret	Ret	9	13	12	7	18	20	13	12	8	12	769
7	M2 Competition 3	5	12	17	16	11	16	18	8	14	4	11	11	Ret	8	16	9	742
7	M2 Competition 3	14	17	Ret	5	Ret	13	NC	16	Ret	14	12	7	6	9	4	Ret	742
8	Giles Motorsport 2	4	19	10	11	9	8	5	3	Ret	NC	20	19	Ret	3	Ret	Ret	636
8	Giles Motorsport 2	25	9	11	Ret	DSQ	DSQ	EX	Ret	10	6	15	16	12	7	10	Ret	636
9	Giles Motorsport 3	7	14	20	15	10	Ret	13	14	8	12	5	10	9	18	19	10	629
9	Giles Motorsport 3	72	Ret	18	18	13	Ret	15	12	15	10	17	22	18	20	15	Ret	629
10	ETEC Motorsport 2	16	8	8	6	12	12	19	7	Ret	13	10	8	10	16	13	Ret	623
10	ETEC Motorsport 2	27	Ret	12	17	Ret	10	Ret	NC	Ret	DNS	22	21	16	13	12	8	623
11	M2 Competition 2	12	15	13	13	15	15	14	DNS	DNS	DNS							551
11	M2 Competition 2	56	20	14	4	Ret	5	12	15	4	Ret	19	12	11	5	Ret	6	551
12	Victory Motor Racing 3	88	13	16	10	6	14	10	9	Ret	9	14	17	17	15	Ret	11	365
13	Neale Motorsport 2	1													**DNS**	18	**1**	91
Pos	Team	No.	TER			TIM			HIG			HMP			MAN			Points

Colour	Result
Gold	Winner
Silver	Second place
Bronze	Third place
Green	Points classification
Blue	Non-points classification
Blue	Non-classified finish (NC)
Purple	Retired, not classified (Ret)
Red	Did not qualify (DNQ)
Red	Did not pre-qualify (DNPQ)
Black	Disqualified (DSQ)
White	Did not start (DNS)
White	Withdrew (WD)
White	Race cancelled (C)
Blank	Did not practice (DNP)
Blank	Did not arrive (DNA)
Blank	Excluded (EX)

**Bold** – Pole
Italics – Fastest Lap
