= Bruno Bonifacio =

Brazilian racing driver

- Nationality: Brazilian
- Born: 2 November 1994 (age 32) São Paulo, Brazil

Formula Renault 3.5 Series career
- Debut season: 2015
- Current team: International Draco Racing
- Categorisation: FIA Silver
- Car number: 20
- Starts: 13
- Wins: 0
- Poles: 0
- Fastest laps: 0
- Best finish: 25th in 2015

Previous series
- 2013-14 2012–14 2012 2011–12 2011: Eurocup Formula Renault 2.0; Formula Renault 2.0 Alps; Formula Renault 2.0 NEC; Formula Abarth; Formula 3 Sudamericana

Bruno Bonifacio (born 2 November 1994) is a Brazilian racing driver.

== Career ==
=== Karting ===
Born in São Paulo, Bonifacio entered karting in 2006, when he took the titles in the Junior Menor class of the Petrobras Cup and Brazilian Kart Cup. Bonifacio raced in karting until the end of 2010, when he became a champion in the São Paulo Cup.

=== Formula 3 Sudamericana ===
Bonifacio made his début in single-seaters in 2011, taking part in the Light Class of the local Formula 3 Sudamericana championship for Cesário Fórmula Jr. He dominated the championship and clinched the title, winning 12 from 14 races.

=== Formula Abarth ===
Also in 2011, Bonifacio moved in Europe, joining the Formula Abarth series for Prema Powerteam. He finished fourteenth in the Italian Series standings with two point-scoring finishes, while in the European Series he finished fifteenth with four podiums. He contested a sophomore campaign with the same team in 2012, improving to third in European Series and to fifth in Italian Series.

=== Formula Renault ===
Bonifacio remained with Prema, as they moved to the 2-litre Formula Renault machinery to compete in the final rounds of Formula Renault 2.0 Alps and Formula Renault 2.0 NEC at the end of 2012. For 2013, Bonifacio had full-time campaigns in both Formula Renault 2.0 Alps and the Eurocup Formula Renault 2.0, staying with Prema. He took a podium finish at Spa and another three point-scoring finishes, to end the season fifteenth. In the Alps series, he scored three wins and finished third, behind teammates Antonio Fuoco and Luca Ghiotto.

Bonifacio stayed for another season with Prema in 2014. He improved to fifth position in the standings, achieving his first Eurocup win at Spa.

== Racing record ==
=== Career summary ===
Season	Series	Team	Races	Wins	Poles	FLaps	Podiums	Points	Position
2011	Formula 3 Brazil Open	Cesário Fórmula Jr.	1	0	0	0	0	N/A	7th
2011	Formula 3 Sudamericana - Light Class	Cesário Fórmula Jr.	14	12	5	13	13	318	**1st**
2011	Formula Abarth Italian Series	Prema Powerteam	4	0	0	0	0	10	14th
2011	Formula Abarth European Series	Prema Powerteam	8	0	0	0	0	14	15th
2012	Toyota Racing Series	Giles Motorsport	15	0	0	0	1	525	10th
2012	Formula Abarth European Series	Prema Powerteam	24	4	3	1	13	219	**3rd**
2012	Formula Abarth Italian Series	Prema Powerteam	18	2	2	0	9	157	5th
2012	Formula Renault 2.0 Alps	Prema Powerteam	4	0	0	0	0	16	20th
2012	Formula Renault 2.0 NEC	Prema Powerteam	2	0	0	0	1	20	35th
2013	Toyota Racing Series	Giles Motorsport	15	2	0	0	4	650	5th
2013	Formula Renault 2.0 Alps	Prema Powerteam	14	3	6	2	8	145	**3rd**
2013	Eurocup Formula Renault 2.0	Prema Powerteam	14	0	0	2	1	29	15th
2013	Pau Formula Renault 2.0 Trophy	Prema Powerteam	1	0	0	0	0	N/A	6th
2014	Eurocup Formula Renault 2.0	Prema Powerteam	14	1	0	0	4	88	5th
2014	Formula Renault 2.0 Alps	Prema Powerteam	6	1	1	1	4	N/A	NC†
2015	Formula Renault 3.5 Series	International Draco Racing	13	0	0	0	0	1	25th
2016	Renault Sport Trophy - Elite	Oregon Team	6	1	1	0	1	37	8th
2016	Renault Sport Endurance Trophy	Oregon Team	4	0	0	0	1	18	14th
2016	European Le Mans Series - LMP2	Murphy Prototypes	1	0	0	0	0	0	38th
2026	Porsche Carrera Cup Brasil								

^{†} As Bonifacio was a guest driver, he was ineligible to score points.

=== Complete Formula Renault 2.0 Alps Series results ===
(key) (Races in bold indicate pole position; races in italics indicate fastest lap)

Year	Team	1	2	3	4	5	6	7	8	9	10	11	12	13	14	Pos	Points
2012	Prema Powerteam	MNZ; 1	MNZ; 2	PAU; 1	PAU; 2	IMO; 1	IMO; 2	SPA; 1	SPA; 2	RBR; 1	RBR; 2	MUG; 1 Ret	MUG; 2; 4	CAT; 1; 8	CAT; 2 Ret	20th	16
2013	Prema Powerteam	**VLL**; **1**; 1	**VLL**; **2** Ret	IMO1; 1; 4	IMO1; 2; 3	**SPA**; **1**; 1	**SPA**; **2**; 2	MNZ; 1; 2	MNZ; 2 Ret	**MIS**; **1**; 1	**MIS**; **2** Ret	MUG; 1; 10	MUG; 2; 7	IMO2; 1; 20	IMO2; 2; 23	3rd	145
2014	Prema Powerteam	IMO; 1; 2	IMO; 2; 2	PAU; 1	PAU; 2	RBR; 1	RBR; 2	SPA; 1	SPA; 2	MNZ; 1	MNZ; 2	MUG; 1; 3	MUG; 2; 4	**JER**; **1**; 1	JER; 2 Ret	NC†	0

† As Bonifacio was a guest driver, he was ineligible for points

=== Complete Formula Renault 2.0 NEC results ===
(key) (Races in bold indicate pole position) (Races in italics indicate fastest lap)

Year	Entrant	1	2	3	4	5	6	7	8	9	10	11	12	13	14	15	16	17	18	19	20	DC	Points
2012	Prema Powerteam	HOC; 1	HOC; 2	HOC; 3	NÜR; 1	NÜR; 2	OSC; 1	OSC; 2	OSC; 3	ASS; 1	ASS; 2	RBR; 1	RBR; 2	MST; 1	MST; 2	MST; 3	ZAN; 1	ZAN; 2	ZAN; 3	SPA; 1; 3	SPA; 2 Ret	35th	20

=== Complete Eurocup Formula Renault 2.0 results ===
(key) (Races in bold indicate pole position; races in italics indicate fastest lap)

Year	Entrant	1	2	3	4	5	6	7	8	9	10	11	12	13	14	DC	Points
2013	Prema Powerteam	ALC; 1; 12	ALC; 2; 11	SPA; 1; 15	SPA; 2; 3	MSC; 1; 6	MSC; 2; 8	RBR; 1; 31	RBR; 2 Ret	HUN; 1; 9	HUN; 2; 14	LEC; 1; 18	LEC; 2; 16	CAT; 1; 24†	CAT; 2 Ret	15th	29
2014	Prema Powerteam	ALC; 1; 3	ALC; 2; 3	SPA; 1; 3	SPA; 2; 1	MSC; 1; 16	MSC; 2 DNS	NÜR; 1; 20	NÜR; 2 Ret	HUN; 1; 8	HUN; 2 Ret	LEC; 1; 8	LEC; 2 Ret	JER; 1; 7	JER; 2; 13	5th	88

=== Complete Formula Renault 3.5 Series results ===
(key) (Races in bold indicate pole position) (Races in italics indicate fastest lap)

Year	Team	1	2	3	4	5	6	7	8	9	10	11	12	13	14	15	16	17	Pos.	Points
2015	International Draco Racing	ALC; 1; 11	ALC; 2; 10	MON; 1 Ret	SPA; 1; 12	SPA; 2 Ret	HUN; 1; 12	HUN; 2; 18	RBR; 1; 14	RBR; 2; 11	SIL; 1 Ret	SIL; 2 Ret	NÜR; 1 Ret	NÜR; 2; 12	BUG; 1	BUG; 2	JER; 1	JER; 2	25th	1

=== Complete European Le Mans Series results ===
Year	Entrant	Class	Chassis	Engine	1	2	3	4	5	6	Rank	Points
2016	Murphy Prototypes	LMP2	Oreca 03R	Nissan VK45DE 4.5 L V8	SIL	IMO	RBR	LEC	SPA; Ret	EST	38th	0
