= Damon Leitch =

New Zealand racing driver (born 1992)

- Nationality: (New Zealand) New Zealander
- Born: 23 December 1992 (age 33) Invercargill, New Zealand
- Relatives: Brendon Leitch (brother)

Toyota Racing Series career
- Debut season: 2011
- Current team: Victory Motor Racing
- Car number: 87
- Starts: 75
- Wins: 1
- Poles: 0
- Fastest laps: 4
- Best finish: 3rd in 2012 and 2014

Previous series
- 2007-10 2006-10: South Island Formula Ford Championship; New Zealand Formula Ford Championship

Damon Bryce Leitch (born 23 December 1992 in Invercargill) is a New Zealand racing driver. He competed in the Toyota Racing Series from 2011 to 2014.

== Career ==
Leitch began his racing career in karting when he was six years old. In 2007 he began racing in formula racing series. From 2007 to 2010 he started in the New Zealand Formula Ford championship. His best championship position was a fourth place in 2010.

Leitch switch to the Toyota Racing Series in 2011. He started for Victory Motor Racing. A third place was his best result. He concluded the season in eighth position in the championship. He was beaten by his teammate Daniil Kvyat who did not drive the whole season. In 2012 Leitch stayed in the Toyota Racing Series with Victory Motor Racing. In the first round in his hometown Invercargill he scored a second place that was his best result until this time. He scored the most points in the first round and led the championship. In the next round at Timaru he won his first race in the Toyota Racing Series. Leitch concluded the season in third position with five podium finishes.

== Personal life ==
Leitch's younger brother Brendon Leitch is also a racing driver. Leitch is named after British racing driver Damon Hill.

== Racing record ==
=== Career summary ===
Season	Series	Team	Races	Wins	Poles	F. Laps	Podiums	Points	Position
2006–07	New Zealand Formula Ford Championship		3	0	0	0	0	52	23rd
2007–08	New Zealand Formula Ford Championship		21	0	0	0	0	580	10th
2007–08	South Island Formula Ford Championship		16	0	?	?	2	68	6th
2008–09	New Zealand Formula Ford Championship		21	1	0	1	9	1007	5th
2009–10	New Zealand Formula Ford Championship		18	0	1	5	8	886	4th
2009–10	South Island Formula Ford Championship		4	2	0	0	3	0	-
2011	Toyota Racing Series	Victory Motor Racing	15	0	0	1	1	517	8th
2012	Toyota Racing Series	Victory Motor Racing	14	1	0	2	5	633	3rd
2013	Toyota Racing Series	Victory Motor Racing	15	0	0	0	1	588	8th
2014	Toyota Racing Series	Victory Motor Racing	15	0	0	1	6	708	3rd
2015	Toyota Racing Series	Victory Motor Racing	16	0	0	0	0	530	7th
2021	Toyota Racing Series	Kiwi Motorsport	3	0	0	0	0	54	10th
2025	GT World Challenge Australia - Pro-Am	Melbourne Performance Centre							
