= Timaru International Motor Raceway =

Motor racing circuit in Timaru, New Zealand

- Location: Timaru, New Zealand
- Coordinates: 44°17′50″S 171°12′10″E
- FIA Grade: 3 (Note: Timaru International Motor Raceway's Grade 3 licence expired 1 August 2022.)
- Owner: South Canterbury Car Club
- Broke ground: 1967
- Opened: November 1967
- Former names: Levels Raceway
- Major events: Current: NZ Super Truck Championship; South Island Endurance Series; Former: Toyota Racing Series (2005–2014); New Zealand V8 (2002–2014)
- Website: www.southcanterburycarclub.org.nz

Long Circuit (1988–present)
- Length: 2.400 km (1.491 mi)
- Turns: 10
- Race lap record: 0:56.260 ( (New Zealand) Greg Murphy, Reynard 92D, 1995, Formula Holden)

Short Circuit (1988–present)
- Length: 1.600 km (0.994 mi)
- Turns: 5
- Race lap record: 0:43.721 ( (New Zealand) James Munro, Mygale SJ08a, 2012, Formula Ford)

Original Circuit (1967–1987)
- Length: 1.600 km (0.994 mi)
- Turns: 7

Timaru International Motor Raceway is a motor racing circuit situated about 10 minutes or 8 km (5.0 mi) outside of Timaru, New Zealand. The circuit is accessible from either State Highway 1 or the Timaru-Pleasant Point Highway. It is often called Levels because of its previous name Levels Raceway. The Timaru International Motor Raceway holds some of the major sporting events on New Zealand's motorsport calendar.

== History ==
South Canterbury Car Club

Before Timaru International Motor Raceway was born there was The South Canterbury Car Club Inc, which was formed in 1947 and were only running hillclimbs and paddock events at the time. The club progressed from this to running the Waimate 50 Street Race on the streets of Waimate until 1966. In 1967 a street event was run in Timaru in the Craigie Avenue area. Land was then purchased at Falvey Road and a permanent 1.600 km (0.994 mi) circuit built, the first event held there was in November that year. The club continued to develop the venue running club and National Championship racing.

In 1988 the circuit length was increased to 2.400 km (1.491 mi) and developed to the international FIA category 3 standard that it is today, allowing the South Canterbury Car Club to run international events as well as National Championships, including the NZ V8 Touring Cars and Super Truck Racing. One of the events of Southern Festival of Speed, Bruce Pigeon Memorial, was held on 9 February to 10 February 2008.

== The circuit ==
The 2.400 km (1.491 mi) car racing track's surface is hard on tyres and brakes because it is chip tarmac. It has a mixture of tight "first and second" gear and fast flowing corners. It is rated FIA grade 3.

== Lap Records ==
The official lap record for the Timaru International Motor Raceway is 0:56.260, set by Greg Murphy in January 1995. As of October 2021, the fastest official race lap records at the Timaru International Motor Raceway are listed as:

| Category | Time | Driver | Vehicle | Date |
Long Circuit (1988–present): 2.400 km (1.491 mi)
| Formula Holden | 0:56.260 | Greg Murphy | Reynard 92D | January 1995 |
| Toyota Racing Series | 0:57.693 | Jann Mardenborough | Tatuus TT104ZZ | 19 January 2014 |
| Porsche Carrera Cup | 1:00.390 | Ryan Wood | Porsche 911 (991 II) GT3 Cup | 16 October 2021 |
| NZ Touring Cars (TLX) | 1:03.689 | Jason Bargwanna | Toyota Camry | 19 January 2014 |
| TCR Touring Car | 1:04.056 | Rhys Gould | Hyundai i30 N TCR | 16 October 2021 |
| Formula Ford | 1:05.240 | Richie Stanaway | Mygale SJ08a | January 2009 |
| NZ Touring Cars (TL) | 1:06.330 | Angus Fogg | Ford Falcon (BA) | 22 January 2012 |
Short Circuit (1988–present): 1.600 km (0.994 mi)
| Formula Ford | 0:43.721 | James Munro | Mygale SJ08a | January 2012 |
