= List of Formula Regional Oceania Championship drivers =

This is a list of Formula Regional Oceania Championship drivers, that is, a list of drivers who have made at least one race start in the Formula Regional Oceania Championship. This includes the period in which the series ran under the moniker of the Toyota Racing Series and thus begins from the series' inception in 2005.

This list is accurate up to the final round of the 2026 Formula Regional Oceania Trophy.

== By name ==
Name	Nation	Seasons	Championship titles	Races (Starts)	Poles	Wins	Podiums	Fastest Laps	Points
Jacob Abel	United States	2023-2024	0	21	0	0	5	0	383
Enaam Ahmed	United Kingdom	2017	0	15	0	1	2	1	586
Hamad Al Fardan	Bahrain	2005-06-2006-07	0	26	0	3	10	0	1123
Neil Alberico	United States	2014	0	15	0	0	0	0	411
Tom Alexander	New Zealand	2021	0	5	0	0	1	0	75
Nolan Allaer	United States	2026	0	15	0	0	0	0	133
Levin Amweg	Austria	2014	0	15	0	0	0	0	409
Rui Andrade	Angola	2020	0	15	0	0	0	0	70
Keyvan Andres Soori	Germany	2017	0	15	0	0	0	0	423
Nathan Antunes	Australia	2007-08-2008-09	0	31	1	2	4	2	955
Marcus Armstrong	New Zealand	2017-2019	0	45	4	10	28	6	2039
Bryce Aron	United States	2024	0	6	0	1	1	1	102
Lucas Auer	Austria	2012-2013, 2019	0	45	8	3	15	5	1656
Earl Bamber	New Zealand	2006-07-2011	0	70	13	17	27	16	2867
Bruno Baptista	Brazil	2016	0	15	0	0	0	0	443
Ricardo Baptista	Brazil	2026	0	15	0	0	0	0	85
Rodrigo Baptista	Brazil	2016	0	15	0	0	0	0	286
Jason Bargwanna	Australia	2007-08	0	2	0	0	0	0	0
Theo Bean	United States	2016	0	15	0	0	0	0	238
Nathanaël Berthon	France	2012	0	14	0	0	0	1	555
David Besnard	Australia	2006-07	0	3	0	0	0	0	90
Josh Bethune	New Zealand	2021	0	3	0	0	0	0	23
Roman Bilinski	Poland	2024	1 (2024)	15	5	6	12	6	385
Shelby Blackstock	United States	2017	0	15	0	0	0	0	421
José Blanco	Puerto Rico	2020	0	6	0	0	0	0	41
Bruno Bonifacio	Brazil	2012-2013	0	30	0	2	5	0	1205
Jake Bonilla	United States	2024	0	15	0	0	0	0	74
Jett Bowling	United States	2024-2025	0	30	0	0	0	0	228
Will Brown	Australia	2025	0	9	0	1	3	1	158
William Buller	United Kingdom	2008-09	0	9	0	2	3	2	467
Michael Burdett	New Zealand	2007-08-2008-09	0	41	3	5	14	3	1780
Timothe Buret	France	2016	0	15	0	0	0	0	349
Tatiana Calderón	Colombia	2013	0	15	0	0	0	0	432
Sérgio Sette Câmara	Brazil	2015	0	7	0	0	0	0	199
Nick Cassidy	New Zealand	2011-2014	2 (2012, 2013)	47	3	10	28	7	2634
Alfonso Celis Jr.	Mexico	2015	0	14	0	0	0	0	329
Michela Cerruti	Italy	2012	0	14	0	0	0	0	367
Chloe Chambers	United States	2023	0	15	0	1	1	1	176
Conrad Clark	New Zealand	2021	0	9	0	0	2	0	183
Elliott Cleary	Australia	2024	0	12	0	0	0	0	124
Ben Clucas	United Kingdom	2005-06-2006-07	0	14	1	3	9	1	689
Taylor Cockerton	New Zealand	2016-2018	0	45	0	0	0	2	1633
Ido Cohen	Israel	2020	0	15	0	0	0	0	154
Franco Colapinto	Argentina	2020	0	15	1	1	8	2	315
Caio Collet	Brazil	2020	0	15	1	1	1	2	219
Brent Collins	New Zealand	2005-2006-07	1 (2005)	22	1	4	12	5	1093
Jamie Conroy	New Zealand	2015	0	16	0	1	1	0	446
Juan Manuel Correa	United States	2018	0	15	1	2	3	2	756
James Cressey	New Zealand	2005	0	17	0	1	1	0	601
Ben Crighton	New Zealand	2005-2007-08	0	84	0	0	0	0	2003
Kim Crocker	New Zealand	2005	0	17	0	0	0	0	468
Alex Crosbie	New Zealand	2024-2025	0	30	0	0	1	1	324
Hamish Cross	New Zealand	2005-06, 2007-08	0	39	0	0	2	0	1255
Yuanpu Cui	China	2026	0	15	0	0	0	0	154
Ryan Cullen	Ireland	2013	0	6	0	0	0	0	122
Mitch Cunningham	New Zealand	2007-08-2008-09	1 (2008-09)	41	7	5	15	4	1913
Wade Cunningham	New Zealand	2005, 2006-07	0	17	1	2	4	3	646
Ignazio D'Agosto	Italy	2013	0	6	0	0	1	0	181
Nicolas Dapero	Argentina	2016	0	15	0	0	0	0	238
Jehan Daruvala	India	2016-2017	0	30	5	5	15	5	1570
Cameron Das	United States	2018-2019	0	30	0	1	2	2	643
Yevan David	Sri Lanka	2026	0	15	0	0	0	0	152
Devlin DeFrancesco	Canada	2016	0	15	0	0	0	0	465
Emilien Denner	France	2020	0	15	0	1	1	0	72
Felipe Derani	Brazil	2013	0	15	0	1	3	0	625
Marc Doran	New Zealand	2005-06-2006-07	0	37	0	0	3	1	1382
Lucas Dumbrell	Australia	2006-07	0	8	0	0	0	0	14
Charlie Eastwood	Ireland	2015	0	16	0	0	3	1	535
Tim Edgell	New Zealand	2005	0	17	0	0	0	0	475
Kristján Einar	Iceland	2007-08	0	9	0	0	0	0	174
Kory Enders	United States	2017	0	15	0	0	0	0	192
Shahaan Engineer	India	2012	0	14	0	0	0	0	406
Henning Enqvist	Sweden	2020	0	15	0	0	0	0	68
Mitch Evans	New Zealand	2010-2013	2 (2010, 2011)	38	20	14	30	13	2182
Mario Farnbacher	Germany	2011	0	12	0	0	1	0	397
Lucas Fecury	Brazil	2023-2024	0	30	0	0	0	0	188
Broc Feeney	Australia	2025	0	3	1	0	0	0	35
Matteo Ferrer	Italy	2014-2015	0	30	1	0	0	0	575
Santino Ferrucci	United States	2015	0	16	0	1	6	2	765
Adam Fitzgerald	Ireland	2023	0	9	0	0	0	0	81
Petru Florescu	Romania	2019	0	14	0	0	0	0	98
Adderly Fong	China	2008-09	0	6	0	0	0	0	190
Lucas Foresti	Brazil	2010	0	12	0	1	3	1	536
Louis Foster	United Kingdom	2023	0	9	0	1	4	4	147
Nick Foster	Australia	2011	0	15	2	0	2	0	510
Igor Fraga	Brazil	2020	1 (2020)	15	3	4	9	3	362
Billy Frazer	New Zealand	2021, 2023	0	15	0	1	3	0	234
Daniel Gaunt	New Zealand	2005-2008-09, 2021	2 (2005-06, 2006-07)	74	11	19	49	22	4237
Spike Goddard	Australia	2013	0	15	0	0	0	0	262
Dev Gore	United States	2019	0	15	0	0	0	0	109
Axel Gnos	Switzerland	2020	0	15	0	0	0	0	60
Walter Grubmüller	Monaco	2005	0	9	0	0	0	0	200
Ferdinand Habsburg	Austria	2015-2017	0	46	0	2	8	3	1769
Christian Hahn	Brazil	2017	0	15	0	0	0	0	372
Matt Halliday	New Zealand	2007-08	0	9	0	1	5	2	417
Alif Hamdan	Malaysia	2014	0	15	0	0	0	0	240
Fiona Hamilton	New Zealand	2005	0	17	0	0	0	0	398
Matthew Hamilton	New Zealand	2005-2007-08	0	43	2	7	14	6	2001
Julian Hanses	Germany	2016	0	15	0	0	0	0	226
Robin Hansson	Sweden	2014	0	15	0	0	0	0	320
Ben Harford	New Zealand	2005-2007-08	0	82	4	12	35	10	3780
Reid Harker	New Zealand	2018	0	15	0	0	0	0	538
Brendon Hartley	New Zealand	2005-2005-06	0	30	1	4	16	2	1572
Nelson Hartley	New Zealand	2005-06-2007-08	0	35	0	0	6	2	1296
Harry Hayek	Australia	2017	0	15	0	0	0	0	363
Callum Hedge	New Zealand	2023-2024	0	18	4	3	11	3	403
Andre Heimgartner	New Zealand	2021	0	3	0	0	1	0	51
Chelsea Herbert	New Zealand	2020	0	3	0	0	0	0	10
Patrick Heuzenroeder	Australia	2025	0	15	1	1	4	1	264
Andrew Higgins	New Zealand	2005-2006-07	0	35	0	0	0	0	957
Josh Hill	United Kingdom	2011	0	26	1	1	5	0	997
Jay Howard	United Kingdom	2005-06	0	6	2	1	4	2	278
Raoul Hyman	South Africa	2019	0	15	1	0	4	0	270
Callum Ilott	United Kingdom	2015	0	16	0	0	0	1	358
Matevos Isaakyan	Russia	2014	0	15	0	0	0	0	410
Daniel Jilesen	New Zealand	2008-09-2010	0	33	0	0	6	0	1261
Michael Johnson	United States	2006-07	0	3	0	0	0	0	36
Nikita Johnson	United States	2025	0	15	0	1	6	1	305
Macauley Jones	Australia	2014	0	15	0	0	0	0	340
Nic Jordan	New Zealand	2006-07-2007-08	0	44	0	0	6	1	1376
Spike Kohlbecker	United States	2020	0	15	0	0	0	0	109
Jordan King	United Kingdom	2012	0	14	1	1	4	1	591
Andy Knight	New Zealand	2005-2010	1 (2007-08)	87	8	15	33	11	4170
Martin Kodrić	Croatia	2014	0	14	0	0	0	0	211
Denis Korneev	Russia	2014	0	15	0	0	0	0	417
Kazuto Kotaka	Japan	2019	0	15	0	0	1	0	176
Mathias Kristensen	Denmark	2015	0	16	0	0	0	0	502
Daniil Kvyat	Russia	2011	0	12	1	1	6	3	600
Nicola Lacorte	Italy	2024	0	9	0	1	2	1	130
Kami Laliberté	Canada	2016-2017	0	30	0	0	0	0	884
Nikita Lastochkin	Russia	2017	0	15	0	0	0	0	263
Nicholas Latifi	Canada	2013	0	15	0	0	0	0	503
Trevor LaTourrette	United States	2026	0	15	0	0	0	0	55
James Lawley	Canada	2025	0	15	0	0	0	0	54
Liam Lawson	New Zealand	2019-2020	1 (2019)	30	7	10	21	12	712
Kanato Le	Japan	2026	0	14	0	1	6	0	272
Luis Leeds	Australia	2017	0	15	0	0	0	0	419
Brendon Leitch	New Zealand	2014-2019, 2021, 2023	0	97	2	6	11	4	3066
Damon Leitch	New Zealand	2011-2015, 2021	0	79	0	1	13	4	3046
Jono Lester	New Zealand	2011-2012	0	3	0	0	0	0	671
Landan Matriano Lim	United States	2024	0	15	0	0	0	0	94
Gustavo Lima	Brazil	2014	0	15	0	0	0	0	405
Arvid Lindblad	United Kingdom	2025	1 (2025)	15	6	6	12	6	370
Parker Locke	United States	2019	0	15	0	0	0	0	100
Ivan Lukashevich	Russia	2011	0	12	0	1	2	1	531
Alex Lynn	United Kingdom	2011, 2013	0	27	4	4	12	4	1317
Sam MacLeod	United Kingdom	2015	0	16	1	2	5	0	684
Sam MacNeill	New Zealand	2007-08-2010	0	22	0	0	3	0	737
Arjun Maini	India	2015	0	16	3	2	5	2	750
Brandon Maisano	France	2015	0	16	4	5	8	5	798
Christian Mansell	Australia	2024	0	6	2	1	4	1	135
Sebastian Manson	New Zealand	2024-2026	0	35	0	2	2	0	373
Raffaele Marciello	Italy	2012	0	14	0	1	2	1	535
Jann Mardenborough	United Kingdom	2013-2014	0	30	1	3	7	2	1281
Artem Markelov	Russia	2015-2016	0	31	0	0	8	0	1113
Josh Mason	United Kingdom	2023	0	15	0	1	1	1	186
Barton Mawer	Australia	2006-07	0	5	0	0	0	0	101
Nikita Mazepin	Russia	2015	0	16	0	0	0	0	304
John McIntyre	New Zealand	2008-09	0	3	0	0	0	0	111
Fionn McLaughlin	Ireland	2026	0	15	0	0	0	0	124
Tom McLennan	Australia	2023	0	12	0	0	0	0	117
Jamie McNee	New Zealand	2010	0	29	0	2	3	0	1044
Charles Milesi	France	2018	0	15	0	0	1	0	504
Calvin Ming	Guyana	2018	0	9	0	0	0	0	320
Melvin Moh	Malaysia	2012	0	14	0	0	0	0	323
Stefen Møller	Denmark	2005-06	0	3	1	2	2	0	150
Nicholas Monteiro	Brazil	2025	0	15	0	0	1	0	132
David Morales	United States	2023	0	15	0	1	2	1	200
Nathan Morcom	Australia	2010	0	6	0	0	0	0	219
Breanna Morris	New Zealand	2023	0	15	0	0	0	0	85
James Munro	New Zealand	2014-2016	0	46	1	1	5	2	1730
Mark Munro	New Zealand	2005-2006-07	0	52	0	0	0	0	1139
Greg Murphy	New Zealand	2021	0	3	0	0	0	0	22
Esteban Muth	Belgium	2019	0	15	0	1	3	0	258
Jin Nakamura	Japan	2026	0	15	2	0	6	1	293
Akash Nandy	Malaysia	2013	0	15	0	0	0	0	361
Thomas Neubauer	France	2017	0	15	0	0	0	0	308
Kaleb Ngatoa	New Zealand	2021, 2023-2024	0	27	1	3	7	2	549
Lando Norris	United Kingdom	2016	1 (2016)	15	8	6	11	5	924
Clement Novalak	United Kingdom	2018	0	15	1	2	4	3	711
Shannon O'Brien	Australia	2005-06	0	2	0	0	0	0	66
Dennis Olsen	Norway	2013	0	15	0	0	0	0	410
Jordan Oon	Australia	2014	0	15	0	0	1	0	395
Egor Orudzhev	Russia	2014	0	15	1	3	8	2	595
Christina Orr-West	New Zealand	2005-06-2006-07	0	67	0	0	1	0	2170
Will Owen	United States	2016	0	15	0	0	0	0	357
Matthew Payne	New Zealand	2021	1 (2021)	9	6	5	9	5	287
James Penrose	New Zealand	2023	0	15	0	2	3	1	214
Sten Pentus	Estonia	2010	0	12	0	2	7	2	660
Lucas Petersson	Sweden	2020	0	15	0	0	0	0	127
Artem Petrov	Russia	2019	0	13	0	1	3	1	181
Josh Pierson	United States	2025	0	12	0	0	3	2	219
Pedro Piquet	Brazil	2014, 2016-2017	0	36	1	5	15	2	1700
Edoardo Piscopo	Italy	2006-07	0	5	0	0	1	0	78
Michael Pickens	New Zealand	2007-08	0	7	0	0	0	0	192
Chris Pither	New Zealand	2005	0	17	0	0	7	0	782
Kaden Probst	New Zealand	2024	0	10	0	0	0	0	63
Petr Ptáček	Czech Republic	2019-2020	0	30	1	0	4	0	364
Antoni Ptak	Poland	2016	0	15	0	0	2	0	426
Keeley Pudney	New Zealand	2006-07-2008-09	0	21	0	0	0	0	611
James Pull	United Kingdom	2018	0	15	0	0	3	0	692
Scott Pye	Australia	2008-09, 2011	0	40	5	4	12	5	1523
Ryder Quinn	Australia	2023-2024	0	18	0	0	2	0	227
Thomas Randle	Australia	2015-2017	1 (2017)	34	3	2	9	8	1462
Matt Rao	United Kingdom	2014	0	15	0	0	0	0	394
Shawn Rashid	United States	2025	0	15	0	0	1	0	169
Oliver Rasmussen	Denmark	2020	0	15	0	0	2	1	158
Andrew Reeves	New Zealand	2005-06	0	6	0	0	0	0	110
Stefan Riener	Austria	2015	0	15	0	0	1	1	483
Ernesto Rivera	Mexico	2026	0	13	1	0	2	1	134
Kalle Rovanperä	Finland	2026	0	11	0	0	1	0	107
Martin Rump	Estonia	2014	0	14	3	2	5	3	629
Mark Russ	New Zealand	2005-06	0	24	0	0	1	0	617
Kotaro Sakurai	Japan	2011	0	12	0	0	0	0	325
Tanart Sathienthirakul	Thailand	2012-2013	0	30	0	0	0	0	845
Grégoire Saucy	Switzerland	2020	0	15	0	0	2	0	220
Liam Sceats	New Zealand	2023-2024, 2026	0	33	2	3	12	4	683
Pieter Schothorst	Netherlands	2013	0	3	0	0	0	0	67
Steijn Schothorst	Netherlands	2013-2014	0	30	1	3	9	2	1384
Michael Scott	New Zealand	2013-2014	0	30	0	0	0	1	708
Zack Scoular	New Zealand	2025-2026	0	30	1	5	10	6	517
Victor Sendin	France	2012	0	9	0	0	0	0	286
Félix Serrallés	Puerto Rico	2012-2013	0	27	1	3	6	0	1193
Louis Sharp	New Zealand	2026	0	15	0	1	5	0	295
Ryan Shehan	United States	2023	0	15	0	0	2	0	173
Titus Sherlock	United States	2024	0	15	0	0	0	0	105
Michael Shin	South Korea	2024-2025	0	30	0	1	7	2	442
Cooper Shipman	United States	2026	0	15	0	0	1	0	108
Robert Shwartzman	Russia	2018	1 (2018)	15	3	1	9	3	916
Sheban Siddiqi	India	2012	0	14	0	0	0	0	212
Jean-Baptiste Simmenauer	France	2017	0	14	0	0	0	0	248
Dzhon Simonyan	Russia	2015	0	7	0	0	0	0	55
Jayant Singh	New Zealand	2005-06	0	20	0	0	0	0	527
Jordan Skinner	Australia	2011	0	14	0	0	0	0	410
Tim Slade	Australia	2006-07	0	2	0	0	0	0	39
Freddie Slater	United Kingdom	2026	0	15	1	3	6	1	310
Ken Smith	New Zealand	2005-2013, 2018-2021	0	109	0	0	0	0	2810
Tommy Smith	Australia	2019, 2024-2025	0	30	0	0	1	0	330
Duane Spurdle	New Zealand	2005-2005-06	0	36	0	0	0	0	958
Richie Stanaway	New Zealand	2010	0	6	0	1	3	2	362
Nicolas Stati	Australia	2025	0	15	0	0	0	0	105
Will Stevens	United Kingdom	2008-09	0	9	1	0	5	0	491
Dominic Storey	New Zealand	2006-07	0	3	0	0	0	0	135
Lance Stroll	Canada	2015	1 (2015)	16	0	4	10	2	906
Dmitry Suranovich	Russia	2012	0	14	0	0	1	0	440
Leanne Tander	Australia	2006-07	0	8	0	0	0	0	225
Andrew Tang	Singapore	2013-2014	1 (2014)	30	1	3	9	4	1139
Jack Taylor	Australia	2026	0	15	1	0	0	0	123
Daynom Templeman	New Zealand	2005-06-2007-08	0	31	0	0	2	0	1566
Will Thomason	New Zealand	2005-06	0	14	0	0	0	0	153
Yuki Tsunoda	Japan	2020	0	15	0	1	3	0	257
Ryan Tveter	United States	2014	0	15	0	0	2	0	344
Ugo Ugochukwu	United States	2026	1 (2026)	15	2	4	8	4	325
Hannes van Asseldonk	Netherlands	2012	0	14	2	3	7	3	738
Chris van der Drift	New Zealand	2005-06, 2021, 2023	0	9	1	0	2	0	129
Tijmen van der Helm	Netherlands	2020	0	9	0	1	0	0	84
Shane van Gisbergen	New Zealand	2006-07, 2021	0	26	4	5	12	8	1225
Laurens van Hoepen	Netherlands	2023	0	6	2	1	5	1	154
Ameya Vaidyanathan	India	2017	0	15	0	0	0	0	358
Richard Verschoor	Netherlands	2017-2018	0	30	4	9	19	3	1754
Chris Vlok	New Zealand	2012, 2021	0	23	0	0	0	0	490
Peter Vodanovich	New Zealand	2021	0	9	0	0	3	1	167
Jackson Walls	Australia	2019-2020	0	27	1	1	0	0	270
Andrew Waite	New Zealand	2007-08-2010	0	23	0	2	3	1	792
Stefan Webling	New Zealand	2010	0	15	0	0	2	0	448
James Wharton	Australia	2026	0	10	0	1	2	1	167
John Whelan	New Zealand	2007-08-2008-09	0	20	0	0	0	0	594
Calan Williams	Australia	2019	0	15	0	0	0	0	183
Dale Williams	New Zealand	2005-06	0	19	0	0	1	0	806
Marc Williams	New Zealand	2005-06	0	19	0	0	0	0	543
Barrett Wolfe	United States	2025	0	15	0	0	0	0	71
Ryan Wood	New Zealand	2026	0	15	1	2	4	3	276
Patrick Woods-Toth	Canada	2024	0	15	0	0	4	0	255
Alastair Wootten	New Zealand	2008-09	0	48	0	0	3	0	1751
Chris Wootten	New Zealand	2010	0	3	0	0	0	0	66
Charlie Wurz	Austria	2023	1 (2023)	15	4	4	7	1	343
Gerrard Xie	Hong Kong	2024	0	14	1	1	2	0	205
Ryan Yardley	New Zealand	2018	0	15	0	0	1	0	525
Enzo Yeh	Chinese Taipei	2025	0	15	0	0	0	0	149
Matías Zagazeta	Peru	2025	0	15	1	2	4	1	244
Lirim Zendeli	Germany	2020	0	15	0	0	4	0	200
Guanyu Zhou	China	2016	0	15	0	1	4	1	685

Currently competing in Formula Regional Oceania (2026 season)
Currently competing in Formula One (2026 season)
Driver has formerly competed in Formula One

== By nationality ==
Country	Total Drivers	Champions	Championships	Current 18 January 2026	First driver(s)	Last/Current driver(s) 18 January 2026
Angola	1	0	0	0	Rui Andrade (2020)	Rui Andrade (2020)
Argentina	2	0	0	0	Nicolas Dapero (2016)	Franco Colapinto (2020)
Australia	31	1	1	2	Shannon O'Brien (2005-06)	James Wharton, Jack Taylor (2026)
Austria	5	1	1	0	Lucas Auer (2012)	Charlie Wurz (2023)
Bahrain	1	0	0	0	Hamad Al Fardan (2005-06)	Hamad Al Fardan (2006-07)
Belgium	2	0	0	0	Esteban Muth (2019)	Amaury Cordeel (2020)
Brazil	15	1	1	1	Lucas Foresti (2010)	Ricardo Baptista (2026)
Canada	6	1	1	0	Nicholas Latifi (2013)	James Lawley (2025)
China	3	0	0	1	Adderly Fong (2008-09)	Yuanpu Cui (2026)
Chinese Taipei	1	0	0	0	Enzo Yeh (2025)	Enzo Yeh (2025)
Colombia	1	0	0	0	Tatiana Calderón (2013)	Tatiana Calderón (2013)
Croatia	1	0	0	0	Martin Kodrić (2014)	Martin Kodrić (2014)
Czech Republic	1	0	0	0	Petr Ptáček (2019)	Petr Ptáček (2020)
Denmark	3	0	0	0	Steffen Møller (2005-06)	Oliver Rasmussen (2020)
Estonia	2	0	0	0	Sten Pentus (2010)	Martin Rump (2014)
Finland	1	0	0	1	Kalle Rovanperä (2026)	Kalle Rovanperä (2026)
France	7	0	0	0	Nathanaël Berthon, Victor Sendin (2012)	Emilien Denner (2020)
Germany	4	0	0	0	Mario Farnbacher (2011)	Lirim Zendeli (2020)
Guyana	1	0	0	0	Calvin Ming (2018)	Calvin Ming (2018)
Hong Kong	1	0	0	0	Gerrard Xie (2025)	Gerrard Xie (2025)
Iceland	1	0	0	0	Kristján Einar (2007-08)	Kristján Einar (2007-08)
India	5	0	0	0	Shahaan Engineer, Sheban Siddiqi (2012)	Jehan Daruvala, Ameya Vaidyanathan (2017)
Ireland	4	0	0	1	Ryan Cullen (2013)	Fionn McLaughlin (2026)
Israel	1	0	0	0	Ido Cohen (2020)	Ido Cohen (2020)
Italy	6	0	0	0	Edoardo Piscopo (2006-07)	Nicola Lacorte (2024)
Japan	5	0	0	2	Kotaro Sakurai (2011)	Kanato Le, Jin Nakamura (2026)
Malaysia	3	0	0	0	Melvin Moh (2012)	Alif Hamdan (2014)
Mexico	2	0	0	1	Alfonso Celis Jr. (2015)	Ernesto Rivera (2026)
Monaco	1	0	0	0	Walter Grubmüller (2005)	Walter Grubmüller (2005)
Netherlands	6	0	0	0	Hannes van Asseldonk (2012)	Laurens van Hoepen (2023)
New Zealand	72	8	11	4	Brent Collins, James Cressey, Ben Crighton, Kim Crocker, Wade Cunningham, Tim Edgell, Daniel Gaunt, Fiona Hamilton, Matthew Hamilton, Ben Harford, Brendon Hartley, Andrew Higgins, Andy Knight, Mark Munro, Chris Pither, Ken Smith, Duane Spurdle (2005)	Louis Sharp, Sebastian Manson, Zack Scoular, Ryan Wood (2026)
Norway	1	0	0	0	Dennis Olsen (2013)	Dennis Olsen (2013)
Peru	1	0	0	0	Matías Zagazeta (2025)	Matías Zagazeta (2025)
Poland	2	1	1	0	Antoni Ptak (2016)	Roman Bilinski (2024)
Puerto Rico	2	0	0	0	Félix Serrallés (2012)	José Blanco (2020)
Romania	1	0	0	0	Petru Florescu (2019)	Petru Florescu (2019)
Russia	12	1	1	0	Daniil Kvyat, Ivan Lukashevich (2011)	Artem Petrov (2019)
Singapore	1	1	1	0	Andrew Tang (2013)	Andrew Tang (2014)
South Africa	1	0	0	0	Raoul Hyman (2019)	Raoul Hyman (2019)
South Korea	1	0	0	0	Michael Shin (2024)	Michael Shin (2025)
Sri Lanka	1	0	0	1	Yevan David (2026)	Yevan David (2026)
Sweden	3	0	0	0	Robin Hansson (2014)	Henning Enqvist, Lucas Petersson (2020)
Switzerland	2	0	0	0	Axel Gnos, Grégoire Saucy (2020)	Axel Gnos, Grégoire Saucy (2020)
Thailand	1	0	0	0	Tanart Sathienthirakul (2012)	Tanart Sathienthirakul (2013)
United Kingdom	19	2	2	1	Ben Clucas, Jay Howard (2005-06)	Freddie Slater (2026)
United States	30	1	1	4	Michael Johnson (2006-07)	Nolan Allaer, Trevor LaTourrette, Cooper Shipman, Ugo Ugochukwu (2026)
