= 2006–07 Toyota Racing Series =

Motor racing competition

Seasons
- ← 2005–06 2007–08 →

The 2006–07 Toyota Racing Series was the third Toyota Racing Series season. It began on 4 November 2006 at Pukekohe Park Raceway in New Zealand and ended on 22 April 2007, also at Pukekohe.

== Teams and drivers ==
The following teams and drivers have competed during the 2006–07 Toyota Racing Series. All teams used Tatuus TT104ZZ chassis with Toyota engine.

Team	No.	Driver	Rounds
International Motorsport	1	(New Zealand) Daniel Gaunt	All
International Motorsport	97	(New Zealand) Shane van Gisbergen	All
Knight Motorsport	3	(New Zealand) Andy Knight	All
Motorsport Solutions	4	(New Zealand) Andrew Higgins	3, 7
Motorsport Solutions	22	(United States) Michael Johnson	1
Auto Motion	5	(New Zealand) Marc Doran	1–4
Auto Motion	5	(New Zealand) Dominic Storey	6
Auto Motion	6	(New Zealand) Jayant Singh	1–2
Auto Motion	7	(New Zealand) Ben Harford	All
Auto Motion	9	(New Zealand) Nic Jordan	1–6
Auto Motion	40	(New Zealand) Mark Munro	3–6
Auto Motion	44	(New Zealand) Brent Collins	7
Ken Smith Motorsport	11	(New Zealand) Ken Smith	1–2, 4–7
Ken Smith Motorsport	11	(New Zealand) Wade Cunningham	3
Mark Petch Motorsport	16	(Italy) Edoardo Piscopo	3
Mark Petch Motorsport	38	(Bahrain) Hamad Al Fardan	1–3
Mark Petch Motorsport	55	(New Zealand) Christina Orr	All
Zenith Racing	20	(New Zealand) Daynom Templeman	All
Victory Motor Racing	28	(New Zealand) Brendon Hartley	
Victory Motor Racing	28	(New Zealand) Nelson Hartley	3–7
Victory Motor Racing	44	(New Zealand) Will Thomason	1–3
Victory Motor Racing	98	(New Zealand) Mark Russ	All
European Technique	42	(Australia) Leanne Tander	4–6
European Technique	47	(Australia) Lucas Dumbrell	1–2
European Technique	47	(Australia) Barton Mawer	3–4
European Technique	47	(Australia) Tim Slade	7
ESWA Racing	45	(New Zealand) Keeley Pudney	4–5
ESWA Racing	45	(New Zealand) Matthew Hamilton	6–7
ESWA Racing	84	(United Kingdom) Ben Clucas	1–3
Chris van der Drift	71	(New Zealand) Chris van der Drift	
David Besnard	72	(Australia) David Besnard	6
Team Meritus	78	(New Zealand) Earl Bamber	All
Ben Crighton Racing	87	(New Zealand) Ben Crighton	All

=== International Drivers ===
Nine drivers in all: USA's Michael Johnson, Italy's Edoardo Piscopo, Bahrain's Hamad Al Fardan, Britain's Ben Clucas and five Australian drivers.

== Race calendar ==
Round		Circuit	Date	Map of circuit locations
1	R1	Pukekohe Park Raceway (Pukekohe, Auckland Region)	4 November	2006–07 Toyota Racing Series is located in New Zealand
1	R2	Pukekohe Park Raceway (Pukekohe, Auckland Region)	5 November	2006–07 Toyota Racing Series is located in New Zealand
1	R3	Pukekohe Park Raceway (Pukekohe, Auckland Region)	5 November	2006–07 Toyota Racing Series is located in New Zealand
2	R1	Powerbuilt Raceway at Ruapuna Park (Christchurch, Canterbury)	25 November	2006–07 Toyota Racing Series is located in New Zealand
2	R2	Powerbuilt Raceway at Ruapuna Park (Christchurch, Canterbury)	26 November	2006–07 Toyota Racing Series is located in New Zealand
3	R1	Taupo Motorsport Park (Taupō, Waikato)	20 January	2006–07 Toyota Racing Series is located in New Zealand
3	R2	Taupo Motorsport Park (Taupō, Waikato)	21 January	2006–07 Toyota Racing Series is located in New Zealand
3	R3	Taupo Motorsport Park (Taupō, Waikato)	21 January	2006–07 Toyota Racing Series is located in New Zealand
4	R1	Manfeild Autocourse (Feilding, Manawatū District)	17 February	2006–07 Toyota Racing Series is located in New Zealand
4	R2	Manfeild Autocourse (Feilding, Manawatū District)	18 February	2006–07 Toyota Racing Series is located in New Zealand
4	R3	Manfeild Autocourse (Feilding, Manawatū District)	18 February	2006–07 Toyota Racing Series is located in New Zealand
5	R1	Timaru International Motor Raceway (Timaru, Canterbury)	3 March	2006–07 Toyota Racing Series is located in New Zealand
5	R2	Timaru International Motor Raceway (Timaru, Canterbury)	4 March	2006–07 Toyota Racing Series is located in New Zealand
5	R3	Timaru International Motor Raceway (Timaru, Canterbury)	4 March	2006–07 Toyota Racing Series is located in New Zealand
6	R1	Teretonga Park (Invercargill, Southland)	10 March	2006–07 Toyota Racing Series is located in New Zealand
6	R2	Teretonga Park (Invercargill, Southland)	11 March	2006–07 Toyota Racing Series is located in New Zealand
6	R3	Teretonga Park (Invercargill, Southland)	11 March	2006–07 Toyota Racing Series is located in New Zealand
7	R1	Pukekohe Park Raceway (Pukekohe, Auckland Region)	21 April	2006–07 Toyota Racing Series is located in New Zealand
7	R2	Pukekohe Park Raceway (Pukekohe, Auckland Region)	22 April	2006–07 Toyota Racing Series is located in New Zealand
7	R3	Pukekohe Park Raceway (Pukekohe, Auckland Region)	22 April	2006–07 Toyota Racing Series is located in New Zealand

== Race results ==
Round		Venue	Pole position	Fastest lap	Winning driver	Winning team
1	R1	Pukekohe Park Raceway	(New Zealand) Daniel Gaunt	(New Zealand) Daniel Gaunt	(New Zealand) Daniel Gaunt	International Motorsport
1	R2	Pukekohe Park Raceway		(New Zealand) Daniel Gaunt	(New Zealand) Daniel Gaunt	International Motorsport
1	R3	Pukekohe Park Raceway		(New Zealand) Shane van Gisbergen	(United Kingdom) Ben Clucas	ESWA Racing
2	R1	Powerbuilt Raceway at Ruapuna Park	(United Kingdom) Ben Clucas	(New Zealand) Andy Knight	(Bahrain) Hamad Al Fardan	Mark Petch Motorsport
2	R2	Powerbuilt Raceway at Ruapuna Park		(New Zealand) Andy Knight	(New Zealand) Andy Knight	Knight Motorsport
3	R1	Taupo Motorsport Park	(New Zealand) Shane van Gisbergen	(New Zealand) Ben Harford	(United Kingdom) Ben Clucas	ESWA Racing
3	R2	Taupo Motorsport Park		(New Zealand) Ben Harford	(New Zealand) Daniel Gaunt	International Motorsport
3	R3	Taupo Motorsport Park		(New Zealand) Shane van Gisbergen	(New Zealand) Ben Harford	Auto Motion
4	R1	Manfeild Autocourse	(New Zealand) Shane van Gisbergen	(New Zealand) Shane van Gisbergen	(New Zealand) Shane van Gisbergen	International Motorsport
4	R2	Manfeild Autocourse		(New Zealand) Andy Knight	(New Zealand) Andy Knight	Knight Motorsport
4	R3	Manfeild Autocourse		(New Zealand) Daniel Gaunt	(New Zealand) Daniel Gaunt	International Motorsport
5	R1	Timaru International Motor Raceway	(New Zealand) Daniel Gaunt	(New Zealand) Daniel Gaunt	(New Zealand) Andy Knight	Knight Motorsport
5	R2	Timaru International Motor Raceway		(New Zealand) Daniel Gaunt	(New Zealand) Daniel Gaunt	International Motorsport
5	R3	Timaru International Motor Raceway		(New Zealand) Andy Knight	(New Zealand) Daniel Gaunt	International Motorsport
6	R1	Teretonga Park	(New Zealand) Daniel Gaunt	(New Zealand) Daniel Gaunt	(New Zealand) Daniel Gaunt	International Motorsport
6	R2	Teretonga Park		(New Zealand) Andy Knight	(New Zealand) Ben Harford	Auto Motion
6	R3	Teretonga Park		(New Zealand) Daniel Gaunt	(New Zealand) Daniel Gaunt	International Motorsport
7	R1	Pukekohe Park Raceway	(New Zealand) Shane van Gisbergen	(New Zealand) Shane van Gisbergen	(New Zealand) Andy Knight	Knight Motorsport
7	R2	Pukekohe Park Raceway		(New Zealand) Andy Knight	(New Zealand) Shane van Gisbergen	International Motorsport

== Championship standings ==
Pos.	Driver	PUK1			RUA		TAU			MAN			TIM			TER			PUK2		Points
Pos.	Driver	R1	R2	R3	R1	R2	R1	R2	R3	R1	R2	R3	R1	R2	R3	R1	R2	R3	R1	R2	Points
1	(New Zealand) Daniel Gaunt	1	1	5	4	2	2	1	14	3	3	1	6	1	1	1	2	1	2	3	1448
2	(New Zealand) Shane van Gisbergen	5	11	2	DNS	9	5	3	2	1	5	2	2	2	3	4	4	12	14	1	1120
3	(New Zealand) Ben Harford	2	2	Ret	3	5	Ret	4	1	4	2	Ret	Ret	3	5	2	1	14	3	Ret	1025
4	(New Zealand) Andy Knight	3	13	4	5	1	4	19	4	2	1	Ret	1	8	2	5	15	13	1	2	1015
5	(New Zealand) Christina Orr	7	4	14	10	11	16	12	8	5	6	Ret	4	9	11	12	12	6	6	7	750
6	(New Zealand) Daynom Templeman	6	Ret	3	9	16	11	7	5	11	8	4	Ret	11	6	7	DNS	3	5	10	717
7	(New Zealand) Earl Bamber	8	8	9	12	12	6	11	Ret	9	10	6	13	Ret	12	9	5	Ret	4	4	600
8	(New Zealand) Nelson Hartley						8	9	10	6	7	3	11	4	7	11	8	8	7	8	566
9	(United Kingdom) Ben Clucas	4	14	1	2	4	1	17	Ret												554
10	(New Zealand) Nic Jordan	13	5	11	8	10	10	6	Ret	7	13	8	3	Ret	4	Ret	10	5			541
11	(Bahrain) Hamad Al Fardan	12	Ret	DNS	1	3	3	2	Ret												530
12	(New Zealand) Ken Smith	14	6	8	15	14				8	4	5	12	5	8	13	11	Ret	11	9	490
13	(New Zealand) Mark Russ	15	10	7	7	6	13	10	11	13	17	Ret	7	Ret	15	14	13	9	9	6	489
14	(New Zealand) Marc Doran	9	3	10	14	8	7	5	DNS	10	11	10									469
15	(New Zealand) Ben Crighton	11	Ret	Ret	11	13	18	18	13	14	14	9	9	10	9	15	14	11	15	DNS	240
16	(New Zealand) Matthew Hamilton															3	3	2	12	5	236
17	(Australia) Leanne Tander									Ret	9	7	10	6	14	16	9	10			225
18	(New Zealand) Jayant Singh	10	7	6	6	7															207
19	(New Zealand) Mark Munro						17	16	Ret	Ret	16	11	5	12	10	10	Ret	7			157
20	(New Zealand) Dominic Storey															8	7	4			135
21	(New Zealand) Andrew Higgins						15	13	7										10	12	127
22	(New Zealand) Keeley Pudney									12	12	Ret	8	7	13						109
23	(Australia) Barton Mawer						9	8	9	15	15	Ret									101
24	(Australia) David Besnard															6	6	15			90
25	(Italy) Edoardo Piscopo						DSQ	15	3												78
26	(New Zealand) Wade Cunningham						12	14	6												57
27	(New Zealand) Will Thomason	18	Ret	13	13	15	14	Ret	12												43
28	(Australia) Tim Slade																		8	11	39
29	(United States) Michael Johnson	17	9	12																	36
30	(Australia) Lucas Dumbrell	16	12	15	16	Ret															14
31	(New Zealand) Brendon Hartley																				0
32	(New Zealand) Brent Collins																		13	13	0
33	(New Zealand) Chris van der Drift																				0
Pos.	Driver	R1	R2	R3	R1	R2	R1	R2	R3	R1	R2	R3	R1	R2	R3	R1	R2	R3	R1	R2	Points
Pos.	Driver	PUK1			RUA		TAU			MAN			TIM			TER			PUK2		Points
