= 2005 Toyota Racing Series =

Motor racing competition

Seasons
- ← none 2005–06 →

The Toyota Racing Series is New Zealand's premier "open-wheeler" motorsport category. The series includes races for every major trophy in New Zealand circuit racing including the New Zealand Motor Cup and the Denny Hulme Memorial Trophy. The cars are also the category for the New Zealand Grand Prix - one of only two races in the world with FIA approval to use the Grand Prix nomenclature outside Formula One.

== Teams and drivers ==
The following teams and drivers have competed during the 2005 Toyota Racing Series. All teams used Tatuus TT104ZZ chassis with Toyota engine.

Team	No.	Driver	Rounds
Auto Motion	5	(Monaco) Walter Grubmüller	1–3
Auto Motion	5	(New Zealand) Andrew Higgins	4–6
Auto Motion	40	(New Zealand) Mark Munro	1–5
Motorsport Talent	7	(New Zealand) Ben Harford	All
Oakley Estates	8	(New Zealand) Kim Crocker	All
Karcher Racing	9	(New Zealand) Matthew Hamilton	All
Karcher Racing	10	(New Zealand) Fiona Hamilton	All
Ken Smith Racing	11	(New Zealand) Ken Smith	All
Wynn's Racing	20	(New Zealand) Wade Cunningham	1–4, 6
Chris Pither Motorsport	22	(New Zealand) Chris Pither	All
EPR	26	(New Zealand) Tim Edgell	All
GVI	28	(New Zealand) Brendon Hartley	All
Brent Collins Motorsport	44	(New Zealand) Brent Collins	All
International Motorsport	47	(New Zealand) Daniel Gaunt	All
Victory Motor Racing	50	(New Zealand) James Cressey	All
Spurdle Motorsport	76	(New Zealand) Duane Spurdle	All
Ben Crighton Racing	87	(New Zealand) Ben Crighton	All
Knight Motorsport	97	(New Zealand) Andy Knight	All

== Calendar ==
Rnd		Venue	Date	Pole position	Fastest lap	Winning driver	Winning team
1	R1	Timaru International Motor Raceway (Timaru, Canterbury)	8–9 January	(New Zealand) Brent Collins	(New Zealand) Brent Collins	(New Zealand) Brendon Hartley	GVI
1	R2	Timaru International Motor Raceway (Timaru, Canterbury)	8–9 January		(New Zealand) Brent Collins	(New Zealand) Brent Collins	Brent Collins Motorsport
1	R3	Timaru International Motor Raceway (Timaru, Canterbury)	8–9 January		(New Zealand) Andy Knight	(New Zealand) James Cressey	Victory Motor Racing
2	R1	Teretonga Park (Invercargill, Southland)	15–16 January	(New Zealand) Wade Cunningham	(New Zealand) Wade Cunningham	(New Zealand) Wade Cunningham	Wynn's Racing
2	R2	Teretonga Park (Invercargill, Southland)	15–16 January		(New Zealand) Brent Collins	(New Zealand) Brent Collins	Brent Collins Motorsport
2	R3	Teretonga Park (Invercargill, Southland)	15–16 January		(New Zealand) Brent Collins	(New Zealand) Wade Cunningham	Wynn's Racing
3	R1	Powerbuilt Raceway at Ruapuna Park (Christchurch, Canterbury)	22–23 January	(New Zealand) Ben Harford	(New Zealand) Matthew Hamilton	(New Zealand) Matthew Hamilton	Karcher Racing
3	R2	Powerbuilt Raceway at Ruapuna Park (Christchurch, Canterbury)	22–23 January		(New Zealand) Matthew Hamilton	(New Zealand) Matthew Hamilton	Karcher Racing
3	R3	Powerbuilt Raceway at Ruapuna Park (Christchurch, Canterbury)	22–23 January		(New Zealand) Brent Collins	(New Zealand) Brent Collins	Brent Collins Motorsport
4	R1	Manfeild Autocourse (Feilding, Manawatū District)	19–20 February	(New Zealand) Brendon Hartley	(New Zealand) Brendon Hartley	(New Zealand) Brendon Hartley	GVI
4	R2	Manfeild Autocourse (Feilding, Manawatū District)	19–20 February		(New Zealand) Brendon Hartley	(New Zealand) Brendon Hartley	GVI
4	R3	Manfeild Autocourse (Feilding, Manawatū District)	19–20 February		(New Zealand) Wade Cunningham	(New Zealand) Brent Collins	Brent Collins Motorsport
5	R1	Manfeild Autocourse (Feilding, Manawatū District)	2–3 April	(New Zealand) Andy Knight	(New Zealand) Ben Harford	(New Zealand) Andy Knight	Knight Motorsport
5	R2	Manfeild Autocourse (Feilding, Manawatū District)	2–3 April		(New Zealand) Daniel Gaunt	(New Zealand) Andy Knight	Knight Motorsport
5	R3	Manfeild Autocourse (Feilding, Manawatū District)	2–3 April		(New Zealand) Ben Harford	(New Zealand) Ben Harford	Motorsport Talent
6	R1	Pukekohe Park Raceway (Pukekohe, Auckland Region)	16–17 April	(New Zealand) Daniel Gaunt	(New Zealand) Daniel Gaunt	(New Zealand) Andy Knight	Knight Motorsport
6	R2	Pukekohe Park Raceway (Pukekohe, Auckland Region)	16–17 April		(New Zealand) Wade Cunningham	(New Zealand) Daniel Gaunt	International Motorsport

== Drivers' standings ==
Pos	Driver	TIM			TER			RUA			MAN			MAN			PUK		Points
Pos	Driver	R1	R2	R3	R1	R2	R3	R1	R2	R3	R1	R2	R3	R1	R2	R3	R1	R2	Points
1	(New Zealand) Brent Collins	**2**	1	2	11	1	1	5	3	1	6	3	1	DNS	9	8	3	5	942
2	(New Zealand) Andy Knight	Ret	10	5	7	2	10	4	4	6	5	4	2	**1**	1	2	1	3	904
3	(New Zealand) Daniel Gaunt	3	6	3	3	10	3	10	2	3	4	14	DNS	3	2	5	**2**	1	874
4	(New Zealand) Brendon Hartley	1	2	6	2	DNS	6	2	13	8	**1**	1	14	5	4	3	8	4	861
5	(New Zealand) Chris Pither	8	8	Ret	4	3	2	7	16	10	8	5	3	2	3	4	4	6	782
6	(New Zealand) Matthew Hamilton	5	3	8	6	4	7	1	1	2	7	DNS	4	DNS	8	7	10	8	755
7	(New Zealand) Ben Harford	7	4	7	5	9	4	**11**	Ret	7	3	2	9	4	14	1	9	2	748
8	(New Zealand) James Cressey	4	5	1	Ret	Ret	12	8	8	9	16	6	6	DNS	7	6	7	7	601
9	(New Zealand) Wade Cunningham	9	7	4	**1**	Ret	5	3	5	4	2	DNS	5				5	Ret	589
10	(New Zealand) Ben Crighton	10	11	12	12	6	9	12	12	13	9	7	8	8	6	12	15	11	563
11	(New Zealand) Ken Smith	6	Ret	10	8	8	8	14	9	12	11	10	Ret	10	12	10	11	10	493
12	(New Zealand) Tim Edgell	13	9	9	DNS	DNS	16	6	6	11	10	DNS	7	6	DNS	9	6	9	475
13	(New Zealand) Kim Crocker	14	14	14	10	5	11	9	7	5	12	9	10	9	DNS	DNS	14	Ret	468
14	(New Zealand) Fiona Hamilton	15	15	15	13	7	17	13	15	15	DNS	13	12	13	13	13	16	14	398
15	(New Zealand) Duane Spurdle	16	13	13	Ret	DNS	13	15	14	Ret	14	12	13	12	10	11	12	13	367
16	(New Zealand) Mark Munro	12	Ret	Ret	Ret	DNS	14	Ret	10	DNS	13	8	Ret	7	5	DNS	Ret	Ret	221
17	(New Zealand) Andrew Higgins										15	11	11	11	11	14	13	12	220
18	(Monaco) Walter Grubmüller	11	12	11	9	Ret	15	DNS	11	14									200
Pos.	Driver	R1	R2	R3	R1	R2	R3	R1	R2	R3	R1	R2	R3	R1	R2	R3	R1	R2	Points
Pos.	Driver	TIM			TER			RUA			MAN			MAN			PUK		Points

Colour	Result
Gold	Winner
Silver	Second place
Bronze	Third place
Green	Points classification
Blue	Non-points classification
Blue	Non-classified finish (NC)
Purple	Retired, not classified (Ret)
Red	Did not qualify (DNQ)
Red	Did not pre-qualify (DNPQ)
Black	Disqualified (DSQ)
White	Did not start (DNS)
White	Withdrew (WD)
White	Race cancelled (C)
Blank	Did not practice (DNP)
Blank	Did not arrive (DNA)
Blank	Excluded (EX)

**Bold** – Pole
Italics – Fastest Lap
