= 2011 IZOD IndyCar World Championship =

Race in the 2011 IndyCar championship

(United States) 2011 IZOD IndyCar World Championship
Race details
- 18th round of the 2011 IndyCar Series season
- The layout of Las Vegas Motor Speedway, where the race was held
- Date: October 16, 2011
- Official name: IZOD IndyCar World Championship
- Location: Las Vegas Motor Speedway, Las Vegas, Nevada
- Course: Permanent racing facility 1.544 mi / 2.485 km
- Distance: 12 laps 18.528 mi / 29.817 km
- Scheduled Distance: 200 laps 308.800 mi / 496.965 km
- Weather: Temperatures reaching up to 93.9 °F (34.4 °C); wind speeds up to 17.1 miles per hour (27.5 km/h)

Pole position
- Driver: (Brazil) Tony Kanaan (KV Racing Technology)
- Time: 50.0582 (2-lap)

Podium
- First: None, race abandoned after 12 laps
- Second: N/A
- Third: N/A

The 2011 IZOD IndyCar World Championship Presented by Honda was a cancelled IZOD IndyCar Series motor race that was held on October 16, 2011, at Las Vegas Motor Speedway in Las Vegas, Nevada. It was to be the 18th and final round of the 2011 IZOD IndyCar Series, with a scheduled distance of 200 laps and 308.8 miles (497.0 km).

2011 IZOD IndyCar World Championship program cover

The race was red-flagged after 12 laps had been run due to a massive 15-car crash, which resulted in the death of former IndyCar Series champion Dan Wheldon and injuries for drivers Will Power, Pippa Mann and J. R. Hildebrand. Contact between drivers Wade Cunningham and James Hinchcliffe triggered a chain of incidents in a cluttered 34-car field, with Wheldon, Power, and Hildebrand getting airborne due to contact with slowing vehicles. Wheldon's No. 77 car somersaulted in the air and crashed into the Turn 2 catch fence at a 90 degree angle, cockpit side first, with his helmet hitting a fence post.

After a two-hour stoppage, the event was abandoned when IndyCar announced that Wheldon had died, less than five months after his second Indianapolis 500 victory. As the necessary minimum of 50% of the race distance (101 laps) had not been completed, no winner was declared, and the event was voided entirely.

KV Racing Technology driver Tony Kanaan started from the pole position, and was leading at the time of the crash. The race was to feature a title fight between championship leader Dario Franchitti and Will Power, who was eliminated from contention after being involved in the crash. With the race being scratched, Franchitti won his fourth IndyCar Series title by default.

The circumstances of the event were heavily criticized afterwards. Immediate blame was put on the experience level on high-speed ovals of some of the drivers, the Dallara IR-05 aerodynamic package that allowed drivers to follow each other closely in a huge pack, and the unsuitability of the Las Vegas oval, whose configuration allowed for up to four-wide, side-by-side racing at speeds in excess of 224 mph. Further criticism was levied on IndyCar's management for the number of cars entered, and the show-first approach of the event.

The fallout of the race led to major changes in IndyCar racing beyond the scheduled and safer Dallara DW12, the new spec chassis for the series from 2012, for which Wheldon had been the development driver. Oval racing became less prevalent in IndyCar competition, as the contract with Las Vegas was terminated, and the 'pack racing' style adopted by the Indy Racing League since the early 2000s on high speed ovals was subsequently avoided, with further recurrencies of the phenomenon (such as the 2015 MAVTV 500 and the 2017 Rainguard Water Sealers 600) being compared to the Las Vegas disaster.

== Report ==
=== Media ===
The event was televised by ABC in the United States. Marty Reid led the commentary team in the booth, with Scott Goodyear and Eddie Cheever as analysts. Vince Welch, Rick DeBruhl, and Jamie Little reported from pit road.

IMS Radio handled the radio broadcast with Mike King and Josef Newgarden in the booth and Mark Jaynes and Jake Query reporting from the track. Davey Hamilton, who was normally in the broadcast booth, served as in-race reporter.

=== Background ===
The Las Vegas race was added to the schedule for the 2011 season, replacing the event at Homestead-Miami Speedway as the final race of the IndyCar season. The races at Homestead and the International Speedway Corporation tracks were removed from the schedule following the previous year's season. Las Vegas Motor Speedway was returning to the IndyCar schedule for the first time since 2000, and the event marked the first open-wheel race at the circuit since the Hurricane Relief 400 Champ Car event in 2005. The circuit since was reconfigured in 2006, which saw a greater degree of banking added to the circuit to encourage side-by-side racing. The race was scheduled for 200 laps around the 1.544 mi (2.485 km) oval, totaling 308.800 mi (496.965 km).

As the final race of the 2011 season, this was also the final race for the Dallara IR-05 chassis, which would be replaced by an all-new design the following year. This situation, combined with the great deal of publicity and expectation surrounding the race, encouraged multiple teams to field additional entries for this race. The entry list featured a total of 34 drivers, five more than the previous event at Kentucky. It had the highest number of drivers entered for an American open-wheel racing event outside of the Indianapolis 500 since the 1993 Toyota Grand Prix of Monterey at Laguna Seca Raceway, the highest number of starters since the 1997 Indianapolis 500 that featured 35 drivers, and the highest outside of the Indy 500 since the 1983 Domino's Pizza 500 at Pocono Raceway.

Among the 25 cars that contested the full season, Sebastián Saavedra returned to the No. 34 car for Conquest Racing after missing the Motegi and Kentucky races because of an sponsorship shortfall, and Townsend Bell remained in the No. 22 car for Dreyer & Reinbold, having become the fourth injury replacement for Justin Wilson at Kentucky. Dreyer & Reinbold fielded the No. 11 as its third car for veteran Davey Hamilton, as the last of his three-race deal along with Indianapolis and Texas, and Buddy Rice joined Panther Racing in a second No. 44 car for a two-race deal at Kentucky and Las Vegas, having also driven the car at Indianapolis.

Part-time teams in the series also took part, as Sarah Fisher Racing was fielding their regular oval specialist Ed Carpenter in the No. 67 after his surprising win at Kentucky. He was joined in a one-off entry, the No. 57, by Tomas Scheckter, who had contested three races that season for other teams. AFS Racing, who had missed a number of races before striking an alliance with Sam Schmidt Motorsports, entered the No. 17 car for Wade Cunningham, fresh from a 7th-place finish at Kentucky in his third IndyCar start. Cunningham had initially signed its three-race programme with Schmidt shortly before the team regained full time status by buying FAZZT's assets, and he was farmed to AFS for the final two races of the deal.

Dragon Racing contested their seventh event of the season with Paul Tracy, who was making his fifth appearance in the No. 8 in 2011. Rahal Letterman Lanigan Racing entered Pippa Mann in the No. 30 for the final race of her three-race deal after New Hampshire and Kentucky, and she was joined in the No. 15 one-off entry by Jay Howard, who had last raced at Indianapolis and the Texas twin races for Sam Schmidt. Finally, there was the Bryan Herta Autosport entry, which involved a switch of drivers between Dan Wheldon and Alex Tagliani (see The 5 Million Dollar Challenge below).

This race was also touted in the leading weeks to the event as the potential final entry for Danica Patrick in IndyCar racing, after she had announced a full-time move to the NASCAR Nationwide Series in 2012. Patrick wouldn't race in IndyCar again until 2018, where she would participate in the Indianapolis 500 to conclude her racing career.

=== The 5 Million Dollar Challenge ===
On February 22, 2011, IndyCar CEO Randy Bernard announced that a $5,000,000 (USD) purse would be awarded to any driver not on the IndyCar circuit to enter the race at Las Vegas and win while starting from the back of the field. Bernard's original offer was exclusively to "any race car driver in the world outside of the IZOD IndyCar Series," hoping to attract interest from Formula 1 or NASCAR. Bernard received offers that he deemed viable from motocross racer and X Games gold medalist Travis Pastrana, former IndyCar champion Alex Zanardi, and NASCAR's Kasey Kahne, but all three offers were not without issue.

Pastrana, who also drove rally cars and would eventually compete in NASCAR, showed formal interest in taking part in the challenge in July 2011. Shortly after, he broke his foot and ankle in the Best Trick event at X Games XVII in Los Angeles, after crashing on landing during his attempt at a rodeo 720, which ruled him out of his planned NASCAR Nationwide Series programme.

Zanardi's problem was twofold. He had not competed in an IndyCar event since the 2001 American Memorial at EuroSpeedway Lausitz, during which both of his legs were severed on impact after Alex Tagliani hit his car after Zanardi, who had been exiting off pit road and lost control of his vehicle. Zanardi also requested to drive for his former team, Chip Ganassi Racing, and they were unable to fulfill his request due to a lack of available resources. Kahne also had this problem, as he desired to drive for Team Penske. In his case, cross-country travel would cause a logistical issue; NASCAR would be running the Bank of America 500 at Lowe's Motor Speedway the night before IndyCar's event.

Bernard later revised the challenge to include a driver who had only competed in IndyCar part-time during the 2011 season; on September 11, 2011, the challenge was officially accepted by 2011 Indianapolis 500 winner Dan Wheldon, who agreed to split the purse with a fan if he went on to win. To compete in the event, Wheldon reached a deal with Sam Schmidt Motorsports to drive the No. 77 car, raced by Alex Tagliani during the season, in a joint effort with Bryan Herta Autosport.

Wheldon had won the Indianapolis 500 in the No. 98 car fielded by Herta, which was loaned and prepared by Sam Schmidt's team, but that car was crashed at the following event in Texas by Wade Cunningham, while driven as the No. 99. Therefore, the deal allowed Wheldon to race the car on which Tagliani had scored the pole position at Indianapolis and Texas, the two high-speed ovals that had been raced until that point. In return, Tagliani would get to drive the No. 98 car for Bryan Herta Autosport at Las Vegas.

Up until that point, Wheldon had only run at Indianapolis, but he later reached a deal to race the No. 77 at the Kentucky Indy 300, the penultimate round of the season, as a warm-up to Las Vegas. Also starting towards the back of the field after failing a pre-qualifying tech inspection, Wheldon went from a 28th starting position to a 14th-place finish at Kentucky.

=== Championship battle ===
Entering the race, the only two drivers still in contention for the IndyCar Championship were Ganassi's Franchitti and Penske's Power, for the second year in a row. Franchitti was 18 points ahead of Power, retaking the championship points lead from him with a second-place finish at the 2011 Kentucky Indy 300 two weeks prior. Power was still mathematically in the points race despite a poor finish at Kentucky, but needed to finish far ahead of Franchitti in order to win the championship. Power had to finish in the top 6 to have any chance of taking the title, and a top 10 finish by Franchitti would've forced Power to finish first or second, positions he hadn't achieved yet in a full-distance oval race.

The race's honorary grand marshal was skateboarder Tony Hawk, who gave the command to start the engines.

=== Qualifying ===
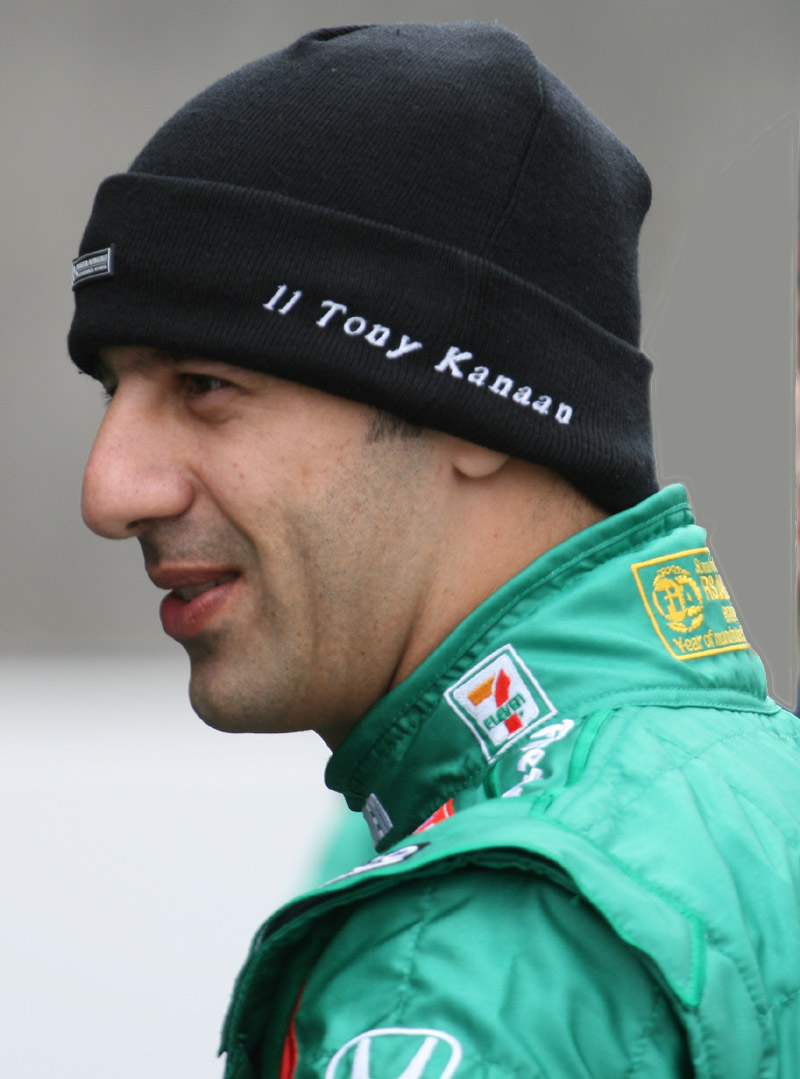
Tony Kanaan won the pole position with an average speed of 222.078 miles per hour

All thirty-four entered cars qualified for the race. Tony Kanaan, driving the No. 82 Dallara for KV Racing Technology, qualified on the pole, scoring the 15th and final pole position of his career, and his first one since the 2008 SunTrust Indy Challenge at Richmond Raceway. Kanaan had started on the pole in the second of the twin-races at Texas earlier in the year, but it didn't count towards his total as it was achieved through a draw. Kanaan shared the front row with Oriol Servià, who fell short of his second career pole by 0.017 mph driving the No. 2 Dallara for Newman/Haas Racing.

Ed Carpenter, the winner at Kentucky two weeks earlier, qualified third in the No. 67 Dallara for Sarah Fisher Racing ahead of Indianapolis 500 polesitter Alex Tagliani, driving the No. 98 Dallara for Bryan Herta Autosport that had been driven to victory by Dan Wheldon at Indianapolis. Danica Patrick, driving the No. 7 Dallara for Andretti Autosport, started 9th in what was her final IndyCar start before joining NASCAR.

Team Penske and Chip Ganassi Racing unexpectedly struggled in qualifying, only making the top 10 with Ryan Briscoe, who was fifth in the No. 6 Dallara, and Graham Rahal, who qualified 8th in the No. 38 Dallara, splitting the four Andretti Autosport cars. Their two championship contenders qualified on row 9, with Power 17th in the No. 12 Dallara and Franchitti 18th in the No. 10 Dallara.

Wheldon, who was publicly unhappy with the performance of the No. 77 Dallara in practice, posted the 29th fastest time in qualifying, defaulting to the 34th spot in the field for the $5 Million Challenge. Buddy Rice, who had qualified in 19th place, was also forced to start from the rear of the field for driving the No. 44 Dallara below the track's white line.

=== Start of the race ===
The race started at its scheduled green flag time of 12:45 p.m. PST (3:45 p.m. EST) before an estimated crowd of 50,000 spectators, who had either bought a ticket for the race or had been given one for attending another IndyCar event during the year. Wheldon had been chosen as the 'in-race reporter' for the ABC broadcast, and spoke briefly with the TV booth during the pace laps. As it had been predicted by drivers and teams alike since practice, the first laps were characterized by high intensity and a consistent trait of pack racing, similar to that experienced at a former venue like Chicagoland Speedway, but in a narrower surface and with a higher car count. Tony Kanaan led the field from pole, and Oriol Servià lost second place to Ed Carpenter at the end of Lap 1, eventually falling back to the fifth spot behind Ryan Briscoe and Marco Andretti.

"Coming out of Turn Four, Graham (Rahal) and (Ryan) Hunter-Reay were banging wheels and Helio (Castroneves) and I had to lift. That allowed Wade (Cunningham) to get a run on us and we went three-wide into Turn 1. Wade got into my right rear (tire) with his front wing and that's what made his car loose and he spun out in front everybody."

— James Hinchcliffe's description of the on-track fight that led to the 15-car crash on Lap 11.

During the 10 laps of green flag racing, there were multiple instances of three-wide and four-wide racing at various points, as some drivers tried to advance through the field. Most notably, Alex Tagliani and Ryan Briscoe touched wheels on Lap 6 while battling for fifth place, before the top 6 drivers eventually settled into a single-car line formation. By the time Lap 11 started, the top 13 cars were running within a second of each other, and all 34 cars were separated by just 4.2 seconds, with no small packs breaking up the field yet. Jay Howard had been the biggest mover, climbing from 27th to 15th, and Dan Wheldon had already gained 10 spots through this period, placing 24th at the end of the tenth lap. Sam Schmidt stated in a 2016 post that Wheldon was 'hooting and yelling' over the radio due to the good performance of his car, after multiple changes had been made overnight.

Other drivers like Townsend Bell, Tomas Scheckter, Vitor Meira and E. J. Viso had also made up between 6 and 8 places during their early run. Multiple drivers complained afterwards about the aggressive racing from some drivers in such an early stage of the race. Championship leader Dario Franchitti took the bottom lane to avoid being caught up in any incident and dropped from 18th to 21st. His rival for the IndyCar title, Will Power, was even more conservative and lost 10 places, running in 27th spot. A similar approach was followed by drivers like Danica Patrick, Scott Dixon and Mike Conway, all of them electing to play it safe in the bottom lane while dropping down the order.

=== Lap 11 crash – Death of Dan Wheldon ===
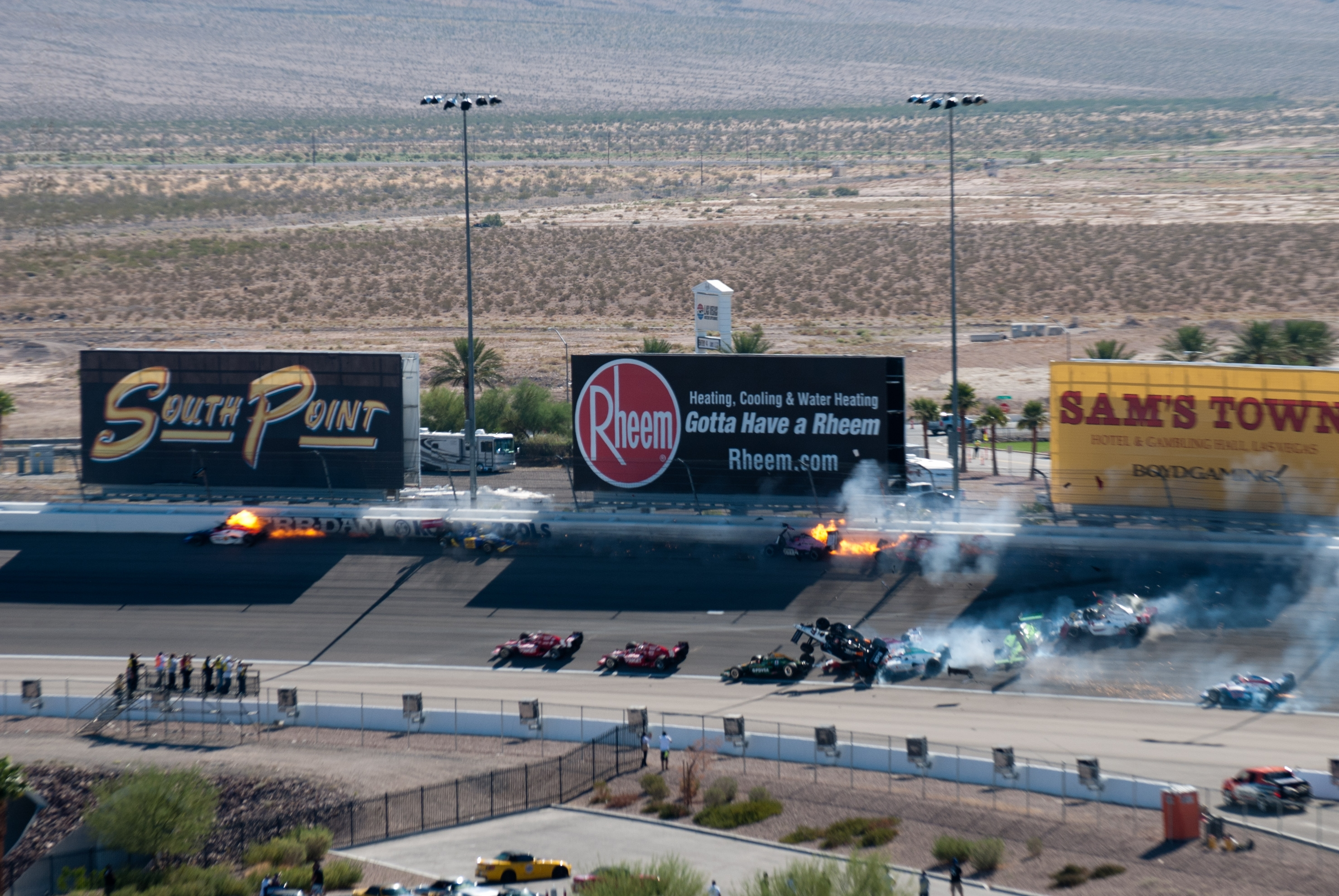
The crash scene just shortly after it began. Dan Wheldon's car, seen at the bottom of the picture (white nose cone, damaged front wing), has just left the racing surface.

The accident began on the front straightaway as the field headed into turn one. Wade Cunningham, Wheldon's teammate in No. 17, who was running in 12th place at the time, tried to make a pass on the outside of a three-wide situation with James Hinchcliffe, driving No. 06, who had Hélio Castroneves in the No. 3 car on his inside. As the drivers approached the turn, Cunningham's left front tire touched with Hinchcliffe's right rear tire. Cunningham swerved to the inside of the track as a result, and J. R. Hildebrand in No. 4 drove over the rear of his car, causing him to go airborne. Cunningham collected Jay Howard in No. 15 on the inside and then Townsend Bell in No. 22 on the outside before colliding with the retaining wall.

Attempting to avoid the crash ahead, Vítor Meira lost control of his No. 14 and spun inward, collecting both Charlie Kimball's No. 83 and E. J. Viso's No. 59. Tomas Scheckter, in No. 57, was also attempting to avoid the crash by rapidly slowing down on the outside. Following that, Paul Tracy ran into the back of his car with his No. 8 and Pippa Mann, rapidly approaching in No. 30 and jerking to the outside to avoid crashing into Alex Lloyd in No. 19, went over the top of Tracy, which caused her car to make a high-speed barrel roll towards the SAFER barrier.

As cars continued to drive through the accident scene, the No. 77 car driven by Wheldon and the No. 12 driven by Power left the racing surface. Wheldon was racing at 220 miles per hour (350 km/h) when he came upon the scene, frantically trying to avoid the collision. Although he was able to considerably slow it down, Wheldon's car went airborne about 325 feet (99 m) after running into the back of Kimball's and went barrel-rolling into the catch fence cockpit-first, causing the lower right-hand side of his head to hit one of the poles. The No. 77 landed back on the racing surface having been sliced apart by the fence. Meanwhile, Power went airborne when he ran over the back of Lloyd's car and struck the SAFER barrier. The car landed sideways on the track and rolled over, which caused the front wheel assembly to break; one of the front tires flew over Power's head and barely missed hitting him. Wheldon's car came to rest close to Power's machine, along the apron at the exit of Turn Two. In 2021, Power claimed that he immediately knew that Wheldon had died as the visor on his helmet was missing.

The seven drivers that were running behind Power at the time of the crash took evasive action into the apron, but Buddy Rice's No. 44 car suffered damage from flying debris and crashed at low speed into Meira's stationary car. James Jakes in the No. 18 was closely behind Rice and had a minor contact with his car. Jakes stopped his car further down the track, but it was eventually refired and was able to make it back to the pits. Meira's car was also refired and completed lap 11, but it was officially retired in the pits due to damage.

"The debris we all had to drive through the lap later, it looked like a war scene from [The] Terminator or something. I mean, there were just pieces of metal and car on fire in the middle of the track with no car attached to it and just debris everywhere."

— Ryan Briscoe's reaction to driving through the scene of the accident, one lap after the collision.

A total of 15 cars were involved, with the most severe injuries suffered by Wheldon, Power, Hildebrand, and Mann. Wheldon was extricated from his car and was airlifted to the University Medical Center of Southern Nevada. He was officially pronounced dead on arrival two hours later at 1:54 pm Pacific Daylight Time. The official cause of Wheldon's death was given by the Clark County Coroner as blunt force trauma to his head due to the incident. Mann and Hildebrand were later taken to the hospital for overnight observation, while Power was evaluated and released that day.

IndyCar officials stopped the proceedings one lap later and put the race under a red flag. The nineteen cars that were still running were called to their pit boxes, and work began on the cleanup. The damage caused by the crash was significant. The catch fence had been damaged where the No. 77 had made contact with it and would need to be repaired before racing resumed. In addition, as some of the drivers drove through the scene during the brief caution period, they reported massive amounts of debris that they could not avoid driving over and that the asphalt surface had received several gashes in it that would need to be patched. With all of the work that needed to be done, there would be a significant delay in resuming the race. The only thing left to be determined would be to see who would win the race. Power's involvement in the incident had resulted in Franchitti clinching the points championship, and with Wheldon also out of the race, since no other driver had taken the $5,000,000 challenge, there would be no prize awarded.

Still, IndyCar officials elected to keep the race under red flag conditions as they worked on a solution. The delay extended for nearly three hours, and tension began to mount over both the status of the race and the condition of Wheldon, as there had been no updates since the accident. During the lengthy delay, ESPN conducted interviews with several drivers, who expressed their growing concern for their fellow competitor, as well as team owner Michael Andretti, who took it upon himself to head to the trailer on pit road where the officials were located. After being turned away at first by the officials, Andretti eventually returned, along with Kanaan and Franchitti. In the meeting, IndyCar Series director Brian Barnhart transmitted that Wheldon had died on the medical helicopter, on his way to the hospital. Afterwards, Barnhart called for all race team personnel to gather at the infield media center.

The meeting was closed to the media, but ABC's Vince Welch reported that Kanaan and Franchitti broke the news of Wheldon's death to the other drivers. The network's cameras recorded the drivers leaving the meeting with grim expressions; Kanaan was seen sobbing in his pit box after returning to his car. During the course of the meeting, there was talk of where to go from that point forward. Some, like Mario Andretti, felt the race should continue to its conclusion; others, meanwhile, felt that there was nothing more that could be done. After the meeting adjourned, Randy Bernard called a press conference. There, he announced that Wheldon had died from his injuries and that the remainder of the race was being cancelled. He then stated that the drivers would be honoring their fallen colleague with an on-track ceremony, then left without taking any questions. ABC cut into the press conference after Bernard had begun to speak and therefore missed his announcement of Wheldon's death; this left Marty Reid to make the announcement to the viewing audience.

"IndyCar is very sad to announce that Dan Wheldon has passed away from unsurvivable injuries. Our thoughts and prayers are with his family today. IndyCar, its drivers and team owners, has decided to end the race. In honor of Dan Wheldon, the drivers have decided to do a five-lap salute in his honor. It will take place in approximately 10 minutes. Thank you."

— Randy Bernard, announcing the confirmation of Wheldon's death to the media.

The ceremony, conceived by Bernard in the meeting, was referred to as a "five-lap salute", with Wheldon's #77 sitting alone at the top of the scoring tower. With Kanaan, Ed Carpenter, and Ryan Briscoe leading, nineteen cars took part in the ceremony. Eighteen of the nineteen cars that were still running after the accident lined up in six rows of three, akin to the starting formation for the Indianapolis 500, with the exception of Bryan Herta Autosport's car, which Wheldon drove to victory at Indianapolis earlier in 2011 but was driven that day by Alex Tagliani. Behind them, James Jakes also took part in the salute, after repairs had been done to the primarily cosmetic damages on his car.

The safety car then led the cars back onto the track while every crew member and person behind the wall moved to the grass separating pit road from the track to watch. The track loudspeakers played bagpipe renditions of "Danny Boy" and "Amazing Grace" while the cars went around the track at pace lap speed, and each time the cars passed the start/finish line the fans remaining in the front-stretch grandstand offered applause. At the end of the five tribute laps, the starter waved two checkered flags to signify the end while the cars proceeded around the track one more time before exiting for the pits in turn four.

The race was the first IndyCar event to be abandoned since the 1999 VisionAire 500K, which was cancelled after debris from a crash entered the grandstands and killed three spectators. Wheldon's death was the first suffered by an IndyCar driver since Paul Dana was killed in a race-morning practice crash at Homestead-Miami in 2006, and the first during a race since Greg Moore died in a crash at Auto Club Speedway in 1999, also at the final race of the season. In the lead-up to the race, SPEED reported that Wheldon was set to replace Danica Patrick at Andretti Autosport for 2012 in the GoDaddy sponsored car, with the company having also sponsored the $5 Million Challenge. Michael Andretti later confirmed that a multi-year contract was signed on Sunday morning, just hours before the race. James Hinchcliffe was eventually signed in early January to take Wheldon's place, and GoDaddy honored the two years of their sponsorship deal.

== Championship resolution ==
The accident on lap 11 ended the championship points battle and would have clinched the season championship for Franchitti regardless of the results of the race. Since the event did not reach IndyCar standards for an official race, meaning it did not pass the halfway mark before it was abandoned, none of the drivers involved were awarded points and the driver point totals entering the race stood as the final totals for the season. The race itself was erased from IndyCar records, and does not count towards drivers totals or statistics, except for Tony Kanaan's pole position, which was computed as the last of his 15 pole positions.

This was Franchitti's third consecutive and fourth overall championship, and fourth consecutive championship for Chip Ganassi Racing (equaling a feat achieved in CART from 1996 to 1999). Indy Racing League, LLC. delayed all official prize-giving, choosing instead to conduct it during the annual State of IndyCar speech in February 2012; Franchitti also delayed his own celebration of his championship victory.

== Reactions ==
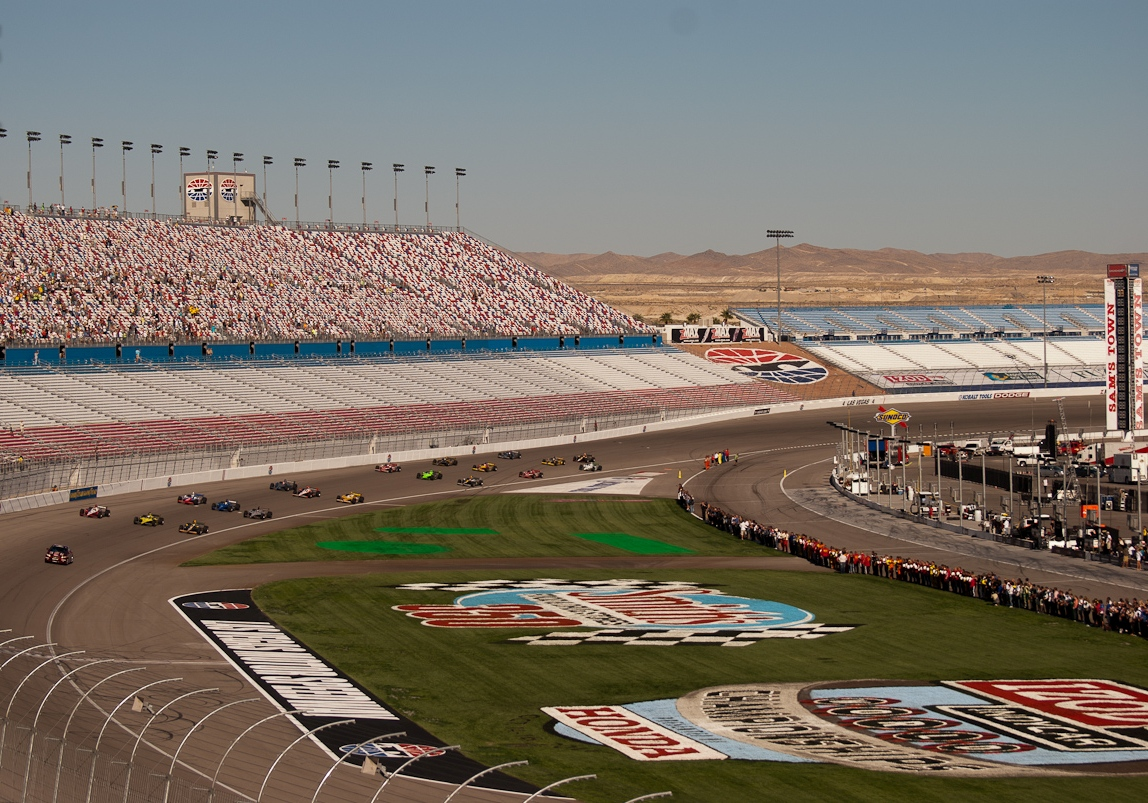
After the race was abandoned, the 19 cars that were not involved in the accident returned to the circuit at pace-lap speed for five laps as a mark of respect to Dan Wheldon. At the far right of this photo is the scoring pylon showing Wheldon's No. 77 at the top.

At the time of his death, Wheldon had been working with IndyCar officials to develop the ICONIC chassis with the intention of improving safety in the sport. Planned changes to the chassis include larger cockpits for driver protection and bodywork over the rear wheels to prevent cars from launching off one another in the event of a collision, long a problem in open-wheel racing, regardless of oval or road course, but troublesome on high-speed ovals and tight street circuits with a long straight and a tight turn, similar to the style of many modern road courses.

Prominent figures within the IndyCar fraternity and the wider international motorsport community expressed their condolences to Wheldon and his family. Wheldon had been scheduled to take part in the Gold Coast 600, a round of the V8 Supercars championship, on October 22, racing alongside his friend James Courtney. Upon hearing of Wheldon's death, Courtney described the accident as a sobering reminder of the dangers faced by racing drivers. As the first major international motorsport event after Wheldon's death, organizers of the V8 Supercars series planned a series of tributes to him at the Gold Coast 600. Wheldon's place was taken by another British driver, Darren Turner, an FIA GT1 World Championship competitor. Wheldon's name was left on the car as a mark of respect, while British drivers at the event paid tribute to him with helmet decals, and several other drivers planned individual tributes to Wheldon.

Kanaan, who had also been scheduled to race in Australia, announced his withdrawal from the event out of respect for Wheldon. However, Briscoe, Tagliani, and Hélio Castroneves, all of whom raced at Las Vegas, along with other part-time IndyCar drivers Sébastien Bourdais and Simon Pagenaud, who were not at Las Vegas, did race. Bourdais, the best performing "International" driver, received the Dan Wheldon Memorial Trophy. Sam Schmidt, for whom Wheldon had been racing at the time of his accident, admitted that the events at Las Vegas Motor Speedway had prompted him to re-evaluate his involvement in motorsports.

"I could see within five laps [that] people were starting to do crazy stuff. I love hard racing, but that to me is not really what it's about. One small mistake from somebody [...] right now I'm numb and speechless. One minute you're joking around in driver intros and the next he's gone. He was six years old when I first met him. I told his son Thursday night at the parade on The Strip that I’ve known his dad since he was about your size. And then I talked to a friend of mine, Jesse Spence, that I used to race go-karts with that we’ve known him since he was this little kid. His mouth worked plenty good, but he was just this little kid and the next thing you know he was my teammate in IndyCars. We put so much pressure on ourselves to win races and championships, it’s what we love to do, it’s what we live for, and then on days like today it doesn’t really matter. Everybody in the IndyCar Series was Dan's friend."

— Dario Franchitti, describing his feelings in the aftermath of the accident.

In the NASCAR Sprint Cup Series, several drivers at the 2011 Good Sam Club 500 at Talladega on the weekend after Wheldon's death put special tributes on their cars, like NASCAR issuing the "Lionheart Knight" decal Wheldon wore on his helmet, which were placed on the cars' b-pillars, along with T. J. Bell putting Wheldon's name on the namerail.

In Formula One, a moment of silence was held at the Indian Grand Prix in memory of Wheldon and MotoGP rider Marco Simoncelli, who died the weekend after Wheldon in a crash at the Malaysian motorcycle Grand Prix, with Jenson Button dedicating his runner-up finish at the race to both of them.

Driver Marco Andretti withdrew from The Celebrity Apprentice, which started taping days after the incident, and was replaced by his father Michael, team principal of Andretti Autosport.

On December 9, 2011, IndyCar decided that they were not going to return to Las Vegas for the 2012 season. Randy Bernard expressed reluctance to return to the speedway following Wheldon's death, despite the insistence of Speedway Motorsports, Inc. president Bruton Smith (who owned the track in Las Vegas as well as three other tracks used by the IndyCar series) for the series to honor its three-year contract with the track. As of that date, the investigation into the accident was still ongoing. IndyCar was holding back on the release of its 2012 schedule until the investigation concluded. The IndyCar series also conducted an investigation into whether or not the series should continue racing on high-banked ovals such as Las Vegas and Texas Motor Speedway in Denton, Texas. Texas had been one of the staples of the IndyCar series since 1997 and had yet to be confirmed for 2012 prior to the Las Vegas race in 2011. IndyCar's future at high-banked ovals was in jeopardy pending the results of the investigation. Texas was eventually placed on the 2012 schedule.

The series went to new restrictions on restarts. IndyCar announced that restarts would only be single-file in 2012, rather than double-file as they had been the previous season.

Apart from Dan Wheldon, this became the last IndyCar race for several drivers, although unofficially, as the race was erased from the record books. All of them had been involved in the crash; 2003 CART champion Paul Tracy and Tomas Scheckter elected to stop driving, with Tracy citing the crash as a major factor in his decision. Davey Hamilton transitioned into team ownership for 2012, and while he denied at first to have retired, he would never make another IndyCar start. 2004 Indianapolis 500 winner Buddy Rice, Vítor Meira and Alex Lloyd also made their last start at Vegas, after all three of them failed in their efforts to find a seat in the following years.

After losing an IndyCar ride for 2012 at the last minute, Jay Howard would not start another IndyCar race for six years until the 2017 Indianapolis 500, one year before Danica Patrick's return to the race in her last professional motorsports competition; both would crash out of their respective races. One year after the crash, Mike Conway pulled out of the final event of the 2012 season at the high-speed Auto Club Speedway and gave up on oval racing, citing the death of Dan Wheldon, as well as two major crashes at Indianapolis, as the main reasons behind his decision.

=== Criticism ===
"A lot of things that happened in this race they are hoping would not happen with these changes. Maybe the scale has tipped a little bit too far to make it more entertaining. They would serve themselves well if they listened to the drivers a little bit more ... and the concerns they voiced."

— ABC commentator and former driver Eddie Cheever's criticism of series officials' renewed focus on entertainment.

In the build-up to the event, several drivers expressed unease at the race – with Franchitti, Oriol Servià and Alex Lloyd the most vocal opponents – particularly given the high degree of banking around the circuit, with between 18 and 20 degrees of banking in the corners. Franchitti was quoted as saying that the track was "not suitable" for IndyCar racing, while championship rival Will Power described the race as "an accident waiting to happen".

The field of 34 drivers was the biggest in an IndyCar series race since 1997. A typical oval track race has six to eight fewer drivers, except for the Indianapolis 500, which normally has a 33-car field, but is run at the Indianapolis Motor Speedway, which is two and a half miles in distance with a maximum banking of 9.2 degrees, as opposed to Las Vegas which is one and a half miles in distance and has banking up to 20 degrees. ESPN.com senior motorsports writer Terry Blount wrote: "Obviously more cars presents more danger. They wanted a whole lot of cars cause obviously this is their season finale and they wanted it to be a big deal. Some of the people that were driving in this event yesterday had no business being in it. Some of them had never driven on a track like this. That was a mistake". Chris Powell, president of Las Vegas Motor Speedway, defended the race, saying that the circuit had passed all of the IndyCar Series' accreditation procedures and was deemed suitable for racing. He also went on the record to say that despite the media reporting the concerns of several drivers over the safety of the event, none of those concerns had been raised with him.

1979 Formula One World Champion Jody Scheckter, whose son Tomas was involved in the accident, was highly critical of the series organizers, stating that a serious accident was "inevitable" as "they were basically touching wheels at 220 mph (350 km/h). They all bunch up together so there are thirty-four cars in a small space of track. One person makes a mistake and this happens. You [shouldn't] have to get killed if you make a mistake. It was madness." Former Formula One and IndyCar driver Mark Blundell agreed, claiming that the Las Vegas circuit was unsuitable for IndyCar racing – this was the last race for the Dallara IR05 – while NASCAR Sprint Cup Series champion Jimmie Johnson called for the series to leave oval racing altogether, though he clarified his statement by saying that the open-wheel type cars on a resurfaced 1.5 mi (2.4 km) track built for the heavier Sprint Cup and Nationwide Series cars was a bad idea; ten years later, Johnson took the Rookie Orientation Program for the 2022 Indianapolis 500 and raced at Texas Motor Speedway, a 1.5 mi oval track, with the added protection of the Aeroscreen.

"I dreaded that style of racing, and I had preached for those two years once I became a regular winner that we shouldn't be racing this way, it was just insane [...] people were up there that didn't deserve to be just because their cars' fast... it requires less talent and more balls, and I couldn't stand that."

— Will Power on the Rusty's Garage podcast, March 8th 2021.

Former champion Mario Andretti said that the accident was a "freakish" one-off incident and that facilities at the circuit were adequate for racing. While he admitted surprise that more drivers were not seriously injured, he also cautioned against what he called "knee-jerk reactions" to the accident, calling for any changes to the sport to be carefully considered before being introduced, rather than being rushed into action. Former Fédération Internationale de l'Automobile (FIA) President Max Mosley, a long-time advocate of increased safety in motorsport, agreed with Andretti, urging a "calm and scientific" approach to any proposed changes, particularly when asked about the proposed introduction of closed canopies for open-wheel racing cars.

The five million dollar prize was also the subject of criticism in that a driver inexperienced in driving IndyCars would have a higher risk of causing a crash, though Formula One driver Anthony Davidson downplayed the influence of the prize in causing the accident, stating that racing drivers by their nature try to win every race, whether they start from first or last.

In the days following the incident, it was learned that at least three additional drivers had been approached to try for the $5 million challenge prize. One was Scott Speed, who previously ran open-wheel Formula One cars for Scuderia Toro Rosso and who had raced on the reconfigured LVMS track in the Craftsman Truck Series for Morgan-Dollar Motorsports in 2008 and for Team Red Bull in the NASCAR Sprint Cup Series in 2009 and 2010. Speed, in an interview he gave to Inside Edition on October 18, 2011, said that he declined to take the offer saying that the track conditions were too dangerous for Indy-type cars. Likewise, A. J. Allmendinger, who also had previous open-wheel experience, had expressed early interest, though he later declined, recalling, "[When] we raced CART at Vegas...it scared the living hell out of me." Finnish media reported that 2007 Formula One World Champion Kimi Räikkönen, who was splitting time between the World Rally Championship and NASCAR in 2011, had also been approached to take part in the race, but Räikkönen rejected the offer as he was not confident of having a competitive car, rather than having concerns over safety.

=== Investigation ===
"The chassis of the [Wheldon's] #77 impacted a post along the right-side of the tub and created a deep defect in the tub that extended from the pedal bulkhead, along the upper border of the tub, and through the cockpit. As the race car passed by, the pole intruded into the cockpit and made contact with the drivers' helmet and head. Dan's injury was limited to his head injury. Dan appeared to suffer two distinct head forces. The first head force created a level of Head Injury Criterion, also known as a HIC number, that normally does not produce any injury. During the initial crash sequence, the accident data recorder measured 12 or 13 impacts. During that timeframe one of those impacts measured a measurable HIC number for Dan – that's the number that does not normally cause injury. The number was low enough. The second force was a physical impact, and it was the second force that caused a non-survivable blunt force injury trauma to Dan's head."

— Brian Barnhart, detailing the sequence of events surrounding the accident in the official report on Wheldon's death.

Three days after the accident, series organizers announced that the race would be the subject of a full investigation. The other members of the Automobile Competition Committee for the United States (ACCUS), the national governing body of automobile racing in the United States, and a member of the FIA made their resources available for the investigation, which IndyCar officials expected to take several weeks. As all ACCUS/FIA members participated in the investigation, IndyCar would have full use of the NASCAR R&D Center in Concord, North Carolina. In the meantime, all testing at Las Vegas Motor Speedway was cancelled indefinitely; Franchitti and Chip Ganassi Racing had been planning to test the 2012-spec Dallara chassis at the circuit in the week following the race.

==== Results ====
The results of the investigation into Wheldon's death were released on December 15, 2011. In a report prepared by crash investigators, it was found that Wheldon's death was caused by an impact with the catch fencing around the circuit. Brian Barnhart further rejected claims that the banking had also contributed to the accident, stating that it created two ideal racing lines, and that these lines made the location of cars more predictable for other drivers; at the time of the accident, all 34 cars had been behaving as expected.

The report also revealed that the right front pull rod of the suspension assembly penetrated Wheldon's survival cell, though it did not cause him any injury. The report recommended further investigation of this phenomenon, as it was the first recorded incident of its kind in nine years of the use of the IR03 and later IR05 model chassis, which was being retired at the end of the race. The pull-rod suspension chassis is not being utilised in the DW12, however, a similar penetration in a DW12 would later cause significant injury to James Hinchcliffe during practice for the 2015 Indianapolis 500.

== Legacy ==
Since Wheldon's death at the Las Vegas oval, much emphasis has been put into the elimination of "pack racing" through changes to the tires and downforce levels on high-banked ovals (particularly at Texas Motor Speedway, for its annual IndyCar event). Such racing has been seen on occasion since the Vegas race, most notably at the 2015 MAVTV 500 at Auto Club Speedway (which ended with contact entering the final lap that sent Ryan Briscoe, subbing for Hinchcliffe, airborne), and the 2017 Rainguard Water Sealers 600 at Texas, where "pack racing" again reappeared (the latter event also featured a NASCAR phenomenon known as "The Big One") and only a handful of drivers finished the race, although none were seriously injured. However, for the most part the league has avoided pack races in the years since the 2011 Finale. Dallara, the chassis manufacturer, would christen the ICONIC chassis the DW12 in tribute to Wheldon, in a move akin to the JSxx naming scheme used by Ligier.

Talk of a canopy or halo to protect the driver was accelerated by the fatal Formula One accident that killed Jules Bianchi in October 2014 and an incident where Justin Wilson was fatally struck in the head by debris at the August 2015 ABC Supply 500 at Pocono Raceway. In particular, following Wilson's death, former IndyCar and then current NASCAR driver A.J Allmendinger stated that he would "never again" run open-wheel cars, adding "The only way I would do it is if they put in a closed cockpit over the car and tested it and they thought that was a good direction in safety then I might think about doing it again." As a result, several major open-wheel series have implemented cockpit protection systems, with Formula One, Formula Two, Formula Three and Formula E all introducing the halo in 2018, and IndyCar instituting the Aeroscreen in 2020.

The rear wheel pods introduced to IndyCar in 2012 intended to prevent cars from becoming airborne when hitting another in the rear proved to be ineffective as there were major crashes resulting from such contact, including Dario Franchitti's career-ending crash during the 2013 race in Houston (where he launched off of Takuma Sato, who was already loose and trying to recover), as well as the 2017 Indianapolis 500 involving Scott Dixon (where he launched off the car of Jay Howard, who was already in the middle of his own incident). In addition the pods were often ripped from cars from light contact, placing hazardous debris on the track. As a result, the rear pods were eliminated for 2018.

In March 2016, during the Kobalt 400 NASCAR weekend, Fox Sports reporter Jamie Little, who was on the ESPN broadcast and drove to University Medical Center as part of post-crash coverage, and Wheldon's close friend Brent Brush placed a memorial plaque at the site Wheldon's car impacted the catch fencing post. For the 2022 NASCAR October weekend as Las Vegas, Nick Yeoman, an INDYCAR Radio broadcaster, worked the PRN broadcast in Turn 2 near the Wheldon plaque. Yeoman posted on Twitter, "Here’s to remembering legends and creating better memories on October 16th," while showing the Wheldon memorial and his broadcast position.

INDYCAR returned to the Las Vegas Motor Speedway slightly over a decade later in January 2022 with the Indy Autonomous Challenge, held as part of the Consumer Electronics Show, using Indy NXT Dallara spec chassis modified for the challenge. The PoliMOVE team of Politecnico di Milano and the University of Alabama won the first two events. Speeds reached 180 mph in the 2023 challenge at CES. Technical University of Munich defeated the University of Virginia in finals of the 2024 Las Vegas round.

== Classification ==
=== Qualifying ===
Final qualifying classification
Pos	No.	Driver	Team	Speed
1	82	(Brazil) Tony Kanaan	KV Racing Technology – Lotus	222.078
2	2	(Spain) Oriol Servià	Newman/Haas Racing	222.061
3	67	(United States) Ed Carpenter	Sarah Fisher Racing	221.509
4	98	(Canada) Alex Tagliani	Bryan Herta Autosport	221.330
5	6	(Australia) Ryan Briscoe	Team Penske	221.130
6	26	(United States) Marco Andretti	Andretti Autosport	221.129
7	28	(United States) Ryan Hunter-Reay	Andretti Autosport	221.040
8	38	(United States) Graham Rahal	Chip Ganassi Racing	220.958
9	7	(United States) Danica Patrick	Andretti Autosport	220.925
10	27	(United Kingdom) Mike Conway	Andretti Autosport	220.922
11	3	(Brazil) Hélio Castroneves	Team Penske	220.907
12	17	(New Zealand) Wade Cunningham (R)	AFS Racing/Sam Schmidt Motorsports	220.790
13	9	(New Zealand) Scott Dixon	Chip Ganassi Racing	220.715
14	06	(Canada) James Hinchcliffe (R)	Newman/Haas Racing	220.701
15	4	(United States) J. R. Hildebrand (R)	Panther Racing	220.639
16	5	(Japan) Takuma Sato	KV Racing Technology – Lotus	220.627
17	12	(Australia) Will Power	Team Penske	220.524
18	10	(United Kingdom) Dario Franchitti	Chip Ganassi Racing	220.489
19	44	(United States) Buddy Rice	Panther Racing	220.392^{1}
20	34	(Colombia) Sebastián Saavedra (R)	Conquest Racing	220.335
21	19	(United Kingdom) Alex Lloyd	Dale Coyne Racing	220.314
22	83	(United States) Charlie Kimball (R)	Chip Ganassi Racing	219.982
23	22	(United States) Townsend Bell	Dreyer & Reinbold Racing	219.942
24	57	(South Africa) Tomas Scheckter	Sarah Fisher Racing	219.816
25	11	(United States) Davey Hamilton	Dreyer & Reinbold Racing	219.493
26	14	(Brazil) Vítor Meira	A. J. Foyt Enterprises	219.273
27	8	(Canada) Paul Tracy	Dragon Racing	218.661
28	15	(United Kingdom) Jay Howard	Rahal Letterman Lanigan Racing	218.577
29	77	(United Kingdom) Dan Wheldon	Sam Schmidt Motorsports	218.410^{2}
30	30	(United Kingdom) Pippa Mann (R)	Rahal Letterman Lanigan Racing	218.157
31	24	(Brazil) Ana Beatriz (R)	Dreyer & Reinbold Racing	218.153
32	78	(Switzerland) Simona de Silvestro	HVM Racing	218.132
33	59	(Venezuela) E. J. Viso	KV Racing Technology – Lotus	no time set
34	18	(United Kingdom) James Jakes (R)	Dale Coyne Racing	no time set

Notes:

1. – Rice was moved to the back of the grid after receiving a penalty for running below the white line.
2. – Wheldon agreed to start the race from thirty-fourth and last place on the grid as part of the organizers' five million dollar challenge.

=== Scoring when abandoned ===
Unlike the FIA Code, which requires three laps for an official race, INDYCAR requires to exceed half the scheduled distance (101 laps) for a race to be official. As only 12 laps were completed, the race was declared abandoned (a non-event).

Pos	No.	Driver	Team	Laps	Time/Retired	Grid	Laps Led
1	82	(Brazil) Tony Kanaan	KV Racing Technology – Lotus	12	Running	1	12
2	67	(United States) Ed Carpenter	Sarah Fisher Racing	12	Running	3	0
3	6	(Australia) Ryan Briscoe	Team Penske	12	Running	5	0
4	26	(United States) Marco Andretti	Andretti Autosport	12	Running	6	0
5	2	(Spain) Oriol Servià	Newman/Haas Racing	12	Running	2	0
6	98	(Canada) Alex Tagliani	Bryan Herta Autosport	12	Running	4	0
7	38	(United States) Graham Rahal	Chip Ganassi Racing	12	Running	8	0
8	28	(United States) Ryan Hunter-Reay	Andretti Autosport	12	Running	7	0
9	3	(Brazil) Hélio Castroneves	Team Penske	12	Running	11	0
10	06	(Canada) James Hinchcliffe (R)	Newman/Haas Racing	12	Running	14	0
11	5	(Japan) Takuma Sato	KV Racing Technology – Lotus	12	Running	16	0
12	7	(United States) Danica Patrick	Andretti Autosport	12	Running	9	0
13	9	(New Zealand) Scott Dixon	Chip Ganassi Racing	12	Running	13	0
14	10	(United Kingdom) Dario Franchitti	Chip Ganassi Racing	12	Running	18	0
15	34	(Colombia) Sebastián Saavedra (R)	Conquest Racing	12	Running	19	0
16	27	(United Kingdom) Mike Conway	Andretti Autosport	12	Running	10	0
17	78	(Switzerland) Simona de Silvestro	HVM Racing	12	Running	30	0
18	24	(Brazil) Ana Beatriz (R)	Dreyer & Reinbold Racing	12	Running	29	0
19	11	(United States) Davey Hamilton	Dreyer & Reinbold Racing	12	Running	24	0
20	18	(United Kingdom) James Jakes (R)	Dale Coyne Racing	11	Running	32	0
21	14	(Brazil) Vítor Meira	A. J. Foyt Enterprises	11	Contact	25	0
22	17	(New Zealand) Wade Cunningham (R)	AFS Racing/Sam Schmidt Motorsports	10	Contact	12	0
23	4	(United States) J. R. Hildebrand (R)	Panther Racing	10	Contact	15	0
24	22	(United States) Townsend Bell	Dreyer & Reinbold Racing	10	Contact	22	0
25	15	(United Kingdom) Jay Howard	Rahal Letterman Lanigan Racing	10	Contact	27	0
26	57	(South Africa) Tomas Scheckter	Sarah Fisher Racing	10	Contact	23	0
27	83	(United States) Charlie Kimball (R)	Chip Ganassi Racing	10	Contact	21	0
28	8	(Canada) Paul Tracy	Dragon Racing	10	Contact	26	0
29	59	(Venezuela) E. J. Viso	KV Racing Technology – Lotus	10	Contact	31	0
30	77	(United Kingdom) Dan Wheldon	Sam Schmidt Motorsports	10	Contact (fatal)	34	0
31	19	(United Kingdom) Alex Lloyd	Dale Coyne Racing	10	Contact	20	0
32	30	(United Kingdom) Pippa Mann (R)	Rahal Letterman Lanigan Racing	10	Contact	28	0
33	12	(Australia) Will Power	Team Penske	10	Contact	17	0
34	44	(United States) Buddy Rice	Panther Racing	10	Contact	33	0

== Standings after the race ==
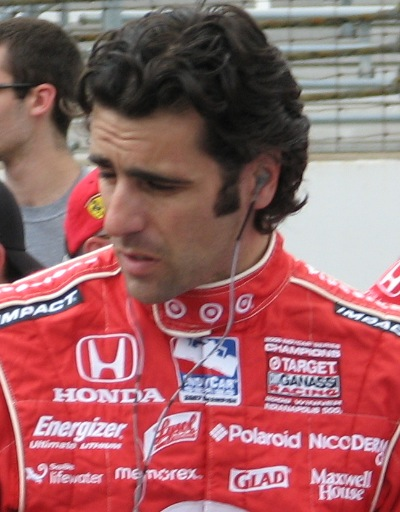
As the race was abandoned after the accident, Dario Franchitti defended his series championship, finishing with 573 points

Drivers' Championship standings
Pos	Driver	Points
1	(United Kingdom) Dario Franchitti	573
2	(Australia) Will Power	555
3	(New Zealand) Scott Dixon	518
4	(Spain) Oriol Servià	425
5	(Brazil) Tony Kanaan	366

- Note: Only the Top 5 positions are included.

== See also ==
Previous race: 2011 Kentucky Indy 300	IndyCar Series; 2011 season	Next race: 2012 Honda Grand Prix of St. Petersburg
Previous race: 2010 Cafés do Brasil Indy 300; Homestead-Miami Speedway	INDYCAR World Championship; Denotes final race of season, naming convention adopted in 2011	Next race: 2012 MAVTV 500 IndyCar World Championships; Auto Club Speedway
