= 2015 Toyota Racing Series =

Motor racing competition

Seasons
- ← 2014 2016 →

The 2015 Toyota Racing Series was the eleventh running of the Toyota Racing Series, the premier open-wheeler motorsport category held in New Zealand. The series, which consisted of sixteen races at five meetings, began on 14 January at Ruapuna Park in Christchurch, and ended on 15 February with the 60th running of the New Zealand Grand Prix, at Manfeild Autocourse in Feilding.

With a third-place finish in the penultimate race of the season at Manfeild, Canadian driver Lance Stroll – driving for M2 Competition – clinched the championship title, having amassed an unassailable 93-point lead ahead of the final race. Stroll won three of the first four races held in the series at Ruapuna and Teretonga (taking the round wins at both circuits) before consistent finishing for the remainder of the campaign allowed him to maintain his championship lead throughout. Stroll added his fourth win of the season in the final race, the New Zealand Grand Prix, becoming the first Canadian to win the Grand Prix. M2 Competition team-mate Brandon Maïsano finished the season as runner-up, 108 points in arrears of Stroll. Maïsano won five races during the season – the most of all drivers – with a win at each meeting except for Teretonga, while taking the round win at Hampton Downs.

Third place in the championship went to Santino Ferrucci, for the Giles Motorsport team. Ferrucci took five podium finishes before taking his first victory at Manfeild, in the second race. He finished 33 points behind Maïsano and 141 behind Stroll. Four other drivers took race victories during the 2015 season as Arjun Maini (M2 Competition) and Sam MacLeod (Giles Motorsport) each won two races – both at Hampton Downs and Taupō respectively – as they completed the top five in the drivers' championship, with MacLeod taking the round wins at Taupō and Manfeild. Two drivers from New Zealand also won races, both coming at Teretonga Park as Jamie Conroy – another M2 Competition driver – and Brendon Leitch, for Victory Motor Racing, both achieved their first victories in the series. Only ETEC Motorsport failed to take a race win, with a pair of third places from Thomas Randle being their best result.

== Teams and drivers ==
All teams were New-Zealand registered.

Team	No.	Driver	Status	Rounds
Giles Motorsport	4	(Mexico) Alfonso Celis Jr.	R	All
Giles Motorsport	5	(United Kingdom) Sam MacLeod	R	All
Giles Motorsport	7	(Russia) Dzhon Simonyan	R	1–3
Giles Motorsport	7	(Brazil) Sérgio Sette Câmara	R	4–5
Giles Motorsport	10	(United States) Santino Ferrucci	R	All
Giles Motorsport	21	(Russia) Artem Markelov	R	All
Giles Motorsport	40	(New Zealand) James Munro		All
M2 Competition	8	(Denmark) Mathias Kristensen	R	All
M2 Competition	18	(Canada) Lance Stroll	R	All
M2 Competition	19	(France) Brandon Maïsano	R	All
M2 Competition	23	(New Zealand) Jamie Conroy	R	All
M2 Competition	28	(Republic of Ireland) Charlie Eastwood	R	All
M2 Competition	36	(India) Arjun Maini	R	All
Victory Motor Racing	11	(Austria) Stefan Riener	R	All
Victory Motor Racing	62	(Austria) Ferdinand Habsburg	R	All
Victory Motor Racing	86	(New Zealand) Brendon Leitch		All
Victory Motor Racing	87	(New Zealand) Damon Leitch		All
ETEC Motorsport	12	(Italy) Matteo Ferrer	R	All
ETEC Motorsport	17	(Russia) Nikita Mazepin	R	All
ETEC Motorsport	49	(Australia) Thomas Randle	R	All
ETEC Motorsport	53	(United Kingdom) Callum Ilott	R	All

== Race calendar and results ==
The calendar for the series was announced on 14 July 2014, and was held over five successive weekends in January and February. The event at Taupo Motorsport Park was held as a quadruple-header, the first such instance for the series.

Round		Date	Circuit	Pole position	Fastest lap	Winning driver	Winning team	Round winner(s)
1	R1	17 January	Ruapuna Park, Christchurch	(France) Brandon Maïsano	(Austria) Stefan Riener	(Canada) Lance Stroll	M2 Competition	(Canada) Lance Stroll
1	R2	18 January	Ruapuna Park, Christchurch		(France) Brandon Maïsano	(France) Brandon Maïsano	M2 Competition	(Canada) Lance Stroll
1	R3	18 January	Ruapuna Park, Christchurch	(United Kingdom) Sam MacLeod	(United Kingdom) Sam MacLeod	(Canada) Lance Stroll	M2 Competition	(Canada) Lance Stroll
2	R1	24 January	Teretonga Park, Invercargill	(Italy) Matteo Ferrer	(Canada) Lance Stroll	(Canada) Lance Stroll	M2 Competition	(Canada) Lance Stroll
2	R2	25 January	Teretonga Park, Invercargill		(United States) Santino Ferrucci	(New Zealand) Jamie Conroy	M2 Competition	(Canada) Lance Stroll
2	R3	25 January	Teretonga Park, Invercargill	(New Zealand) Brendon Leitch	(United States) Santino Ferrucci	(New Zealand) Brendon Leitch	Victory Motor Racing	(Canada) Lance Stroll
3	R1	31 January	Hampton Downs Motorsport Park, Waikato	(India) Arjun Maini	(India) Arjun Maini	(India) Arjun Maini	M2 Competition	(France) Brandon Maïsano
3	R2	1 February	Hampton Downs Motorsport Park, Waikato		(Austria) Ferdinand Habsburg	(France) Brandon Maïsano	M2 Competition	(France) Brandon Maïsano
3	R3	1 February	Hampton Downs Motorsport Park, Waikato	(France) Brandon Maïsano	(India) Arjun Maini	(United Kingdom) Sam MacLeod	Giles Motorsport	(France) Brandon Maïsano
4	R1	7 February	Taupo Motorsport Park, Taupō	(India) Arjun Maini	(Australia) Thomas Randle	(United Kingdom) Sam MacLeod	Giles Motorsport	(United Kingdom) Sam MacLeod
4	R2	7 February	Taupo Motorsport Park, Taupō		(France) Brandon Maïsano	(France) Brandon Maïsano	M2 Competition	(United Kingdom) Sam MacLeod
4	R3	8 February	Taupo Motorsport Park, Taupō	(France) Brandon Maïsano	(France) Brandon Maïsano	(France) Brandon Maïsano	M2 Competition	(United Kingdom) Sam MacLeod
4	R4	8 February	Taupo Motorsport Park, Taupō	(India) Arjun Maini	(Republic of Ireland) Charlie Eastwood	(India) Arjun Maini	M2 Competition	(United Kingdom) Sam MacLeod
5	R1	14 February	Manfeild Autocourse, Feilding	(France) Brandon Maïsano	(France) Brandon Maïsano	(France) Brandon Maïsano	M2 Competition	(United Kingdom) Sam MacLeod
5	R2	15 February	Manfeild Autocourse, Feilding		(United Kingdom) Callum Ilott	(United States) Santino Ferrucci	Giles Motorsport	(United Kingdom) Sam MacLeod
5	R3	15 February	Manfeild Autocourse, Feilding	(India) Arjun Maini	(France) Brandon Maïsano	(Canada) Lance Stroll	M2 Competition	(United Kingdom) Sam MacLeod

== Championship standings ==
In order for a driver to score championship points, they had to complete at least 75% of the race winner's distance, and be running at the race's completion. All races counted towards the final championship standings.

Scoring system

Position	1st	2nd	3rd	4th	5th	6th	7th	8th	9th	10th	11th	12th	13th	14th	15th	16th	17th	18th	19th	20th
Points	75	67	60	54	49	45	42	39	36	33	30	28	26	24	22	20	18	16	14	12

=== Drivers' championship ===
Pos.	Driver	RUA			TER			HMP			TAU				MAN			Points
1	(Canada) Lance Stroll	1	4	1	1	3	3	Ret	5	2	3	4	2	11	6	3	1	906
2	(France) Brandon Maïsano	**5**	1	Ret	12	11	6	2	1	**3**	6	1	**1**	Ret	**1**	8	3	798
3	(United States) Santino Ferrucci	7	5	4	Ret	17	2	3	3	5	2	2	8	16	5	1	5	765
4	(India) Arjun Maini	2	6	2	9	7	4	**1**	16	4	**12**	14	4	**1**	2	17	**14**	750
5	(United Kingdom) Sam MacLeod	Ret	8	**5**	Ret	13	5	Ret	9	1	1	6	3	5	3	2	4	684
6	(New Zealand) Damon Leitch	15	9	14	8	9	13	5	6	18	8	8	5	6	12	16	10	546
7	(Republic of Ireland) Charlie Eastwood	4	2	Ret	14	12	10	12	14	15	NC	9	7	3	15	12	2	535
8	(Russia) Artem Markelov	Ret	Ret	3	5	2	7	7	Ret	6	14	Ret	Ret	2	7	7	6	525
9	(New Zealand) James Munro	13	10	12	2	4	9	6	Ret	9	7	Ret	6	4	9	Ret	16	522
10	(Australia) Thomas Randle	3	14	6	11	8	8	Ret	8	7	4	3	Ret	9	19	Ret	9	518
11	(Denmark) Mathias Kristensen	9	12	10	10	10	14	9	4	19	11	7	14	7	14	10	18	502
12	(Austria) Ferdinand Habsburg	6	3	Ret	7	6	12	10	2	11	15	16	16	14	11	14	Ret	490
13	(Austria) Stefan Riener	11	15	7	3	Ret	DNS	13	7	10	9	5	15	Ret	10	5	8	483
14	(New Zealand) Brendon Leitch	10	Ret	9	4	5	**1**	DSQ	11	16	NC	11	10	8	13	11	15	477
15	(New Zealand) Jamie Conroy	12	11	13	6	1	11	NC	13	14	Ret	13	11	13	18	9	12	446
16	(United Kingdom) Callum Ilott	16	NC	Ret	15	14	Ret	4	12	17	Ret	12	12	12	4	4	Ret	358
17	(Mexico) Alfonso Celis Jr.	8	7	8	DNS	Ret	DNS	Ret	10	12	10	Ret	18	10	17	15	13	329
18	(Russia) Nikita Mazepin	Ret	13	Ret	13	16	15	11	Ret	8	13	10	17	15	20	Ret	11	304
19	(Italy) Matteo Ferrer	14	16	11	**Ret**	15	NC	Ret	15	13	Ret	17	9	Ret	16	13	7	286
20	(Brazil) Sérgio Sette Câmara										5	15	13	Ret	8	6	17	199
21	(Russia) Dzhon Simonyan	Ret	Ret	DNS	DNS	18	Ret	8	NC	Ret								55
Pos.	Driver	RUA			TER			HMP			TAU				MAN			Points

Colour	Result
Gold	Winner
Silver	Second place
Bronze	Third place
Green	Points classification
Blue	Non-points classification
Blue	Non-classified finish (NC)
Purple	Retired, not classified (Ret)
Red	Did not qualify (DNQ)
Red	Did not pre-qualify (DNPQ)
Black	Disqualified (DSQ)
White	Did not start (DNS)
White	Withdrew (WD)
White	Race cancelled (C)
Blank	Did not practice (DNP)
Blank	Did not arrive (DNA)
Blank	Excluded (EX)

**Bold** – Pole
Italics – Fastest Lap
