= 2005–06 Toyota Racing Series =

Motor racing competition

Seasons
- ← 2005 2006–07 →

The 2005–06 Toyota Racing Series was the second Toyota Racing Series season. It began on November 4, 2005, at Pukekohe and ended on Sunday, April 23, 2006, also at Pukekohe.

== Teams and drivers ==
The following teams and drivers have competed during the 2005–06 Toyota Racing Series. All teams used Tatuus TT104ZZ chassis with Toyota engine.

Team	No.	Driver	Rounds
Brent Collins Motorsport	1	(New Zealand) Brent Collins	5
Motorsport Solutions	4	(New Zealand) Andrew Higgins	All
Auto Motion	5	(New Zealand) Marc Doran	All
Auto Motion	40	(New Zealand) Mark Munro	All
Jayant Singh Motorsport	6	(New Zealand) Jayant Singh	All
Cobra Vehicle Security	7	(New Zealand) Ben Harford	All
Karcher Racing	9	(New Zealand) Matthew Hamilton	1–6, 8
Ken Smith Racing	11	(New Zealand) Ken Smith	All
Victory Motorsport	15	(New Zealand) Marc Williams	All
Victory Motorsport	28	(New Zealand) Brendon Hartley	3–6
Lancer Racing	18	(New Zealand) Andrew Reeves	1–2
Spurdle Motorsport	76	(New Zealand) Duane Spurdle	All
Kiwi American Racing	20	(New Zealand) Daynom Templeman	All
Mark Petch Motorsport	22	(United Kingdom) Jay Howard	1, 3
Mark Petch Motorsport	22	(Denmark) Steffen Møller	2
Mark Petch Motorsport	55	(New Zealand) Christina Orr	All
Mark Russ	28	(New Zealand) Mark Russ	7–8
Team Meritus	38	(Bahrain) Hamad Al Fardan	1–5
International Motorsport	47	(New Zealand) Daniel Gaunt	All
International Motorsport	48	(New Zealand) Dale Williams	All
International Motorsport	70	(New Zealand) Chris van der Drift	3
Victory Motor Racing	50	(New Zealand) Nelson Hartley	4
Victory Motor Racing	50	(New Zealand) James Cressey	
Victory Motor Racing	50	(New Zealand) Shannon O'Brien	5
Victory Motor Racing	50	(New Zealand) Will Thomason	6–8
ESWA Racing	66	(New Zealand) Hamish Cross	All
ESWA Racing	84	(United Kingdom) Ben Clucas	8
Ben Crighton Racing	87	(New Zealand) Ben Crighton	All
Knight Motorsport	97	(New Zealand) Andy Knight	All

=== International drivers ===
The 2005/2006 Toyota Racing Series featured four overseas drivers. Two British drivers (Jay Howard, Ben Clucas), Stefen Møller from Denmark and Hamad Al Fardan from Bahrain.

== Calendar ==
Round		Date	Venue	Pole position	Fastest lap	Winning driver	Winning team
2005
1	R1	November 4–6	Pukekohe Park Raceway, Pukekohe	(New Zealand) Daniel Gaunt	(New Zealand) Matthew Hamilton	(New Zealand) Matthew Hamilton	Karcher Racing
1	R2	November 4–6	Pukekohe Park Raceway, Pukekohe		(New Zealand) Daniel Gaunt	(New Zealand) Matthew Hamilton	Karcher Racing
1	R3	November 4–6	Pukekohe Park Raceway, Pukekohe		(New Zealand) Daniel Gaunt	(New Zealand) Daniel Gaunt	International Motorsport
2	R1	November 25–27	Ruapuna Park, Christchurch	(New Zealand) Matthew Hamilton	(New Zealand) Marc Doran	(Denmark) Steffen Møller	Mark Petch Motorsport
2	R2	November 25–27	Ruapuna Park, Christchurch		(New Zealand) Andy Knight	(Denmark) Steffen Møller	Mark Petch Motorsport
2	R3	November 25–27	Ruapuna Park, Christchurch		(New Zealand) Daniel Gaunt	(New Zealand) Daniel Gaunt	International Motorsport
2006
3	R1	January 13–15	Teretonga Park, Invercargill	(United Kingdom) Jay Howard	(United Kingdom) Jay Howard	(New Zealand) Andy Knight	Knight Motorsport
3	R2	January 13–15	Teretonga Park, Invercargill		(United Kingdom) Jay Howard	(United Kingdom) Jay Howard	Mark Petch Motorsport
3	R3	January 13–15	Teretonga Park, Invercargill		(New Zealand) Andy Knight	(Bahrain) Hamad Al Fardan	Team Meritus
4	R1	January 20–23	Timaru Raceway, Timaru	(New Zealand) Daniel Gaunt	(New Zealand) Daniel Gaunt	(New Zealand) Daniel Gaunt	International Motorsport
4	R2	January 20–23	Timaru Raceway, Timaru		(New Zealand) Ben Harford	(New Zealand) Ben Harford	Cobra Vehicle Security
4	R3	January 20–23	Timaru Raceway, Timaru		(New Zealand) Ben Harford	(New Zealand) Ben Harford	Cobra Vehicle Security
5	R1	January 27–29	Ruapuna Park, Christchurch			(New Zealand) Matthew Hamilton	Karcher Racing
5	R2	January 27–29	Ruapuna Park, Christchurch			(New Zealand) Matthew Hamilton	Karcher Racing
5	R3	January 27–29	Ruapuna Park, Christchurch			(New Zealand) Matthew Hamilton	Karcher Racing
6	R1	February 17–19	Manfeild Autocourse, Feilding	(New Zealand) Daniel Gaunt	(New Zealand) Daniel Gaunt	(New Zealand) Daniel Gaunt	International Motorsport
6	R2	February 17–19	Manfeild Autocourse, Feilding		(New Zealand) Daniel Gaunt	(New Zealand) Daniel Gaunt	International Motorsport
6	R3	February 17–19	Manfeild Autocourse, Feilding		(New Zealand) Daniel Gaunt	(New Zealand) Brendon Hartley	Victory Motor Racing
7	R1	March 17–19	Taupo Motorsport Park, Taupō	(New Zealand) Daniel Gaunt	(New Zealand) Daniel Gaunt	(New Zealand) Andy Knight	Knight Motorsport
7	R2	March 17–19	Taupo Motorsport Park, Taupō		(New Zealand) Daniel Gaunt	(New Zealand) Daniel Gaunt	International Motorsport
7	R3	March 17–19	Taupo Motorsport Park, Taupō		(New Zealand) Ben Harford	(New Zealand) Ben Harford	Cobra Vehicle Security
8	R1	April 21–23	Pukekohe Park Raceway, Pukekohe	(New Zealand) Daniel Gaunt	(New Zealand) Daniel Gaunt	(New Zealand) Daniel Gaunt	International Motorsport
8	R2	April 21–23	Pukekohe Park Raceway, Pukekohe		(United Kingdom) Ben Clucas	(United Kingdom) Ben Clucas	ESWA Racing

*International Series
**V8 Supercar support race.

== Championship standings ==
=== Drivers' championship ===
Pos.	Driver	PUK1			RUA1			TER			TIM			RUA2			MAN			TAU			PUK2			Points
Pos.	Driver	R1	R2	R3	R1	R2	R3	R1	R2	R3	R1	R2	R3	R1	R2	R3	R1	R2	R3	R1	R2	R3	R1	R2	R3	Points
1	(New Zealand) Daniel Gaunt	4	2	1	2	2	1	2	3	2	1	2	6	5	4	3	1	1	4	2	1	2	1	2	4	1491
2	(New Zealand) Ben Harford	2	11	3	16	16	4	3	2	13	9	1	1	4	5	10	12	2	Ret	14	4	1	Ret	5	11	1012
3	(New Zealand) Andy Knight	Ret	6	10	Ret	3	6	1	5	DSQ	6	16	4	2	2	Ret	3	4	2	1	3	Ret	2	3	18	943
4	(New Zealand) Marc Doran	8	9	5	3	5	5	8	18	5	8	8	5	16	10	11	Ret	12	3	8	6	4	5	6	6	913
5	(New Zealand) Matthew Hamilton	1	1	12	13	4	DNS	4	9	7	3	17	2	1	1	1	Ret	6	8				Ret	12	8	883
6	(New Zealand) Dale Williams	10	10	7	14	8	7	7	6	14	4	5	9	Ret	8	Ret	8	9	Ret	4	7	5	14	4	3	806
7	(New Zealand) Christina Orr	8	8	6	4	Ret	14	12	16	11	14	11	11	12	15	7	4	7	9	5	2	Ret	11	15	14	759
8	(New Zealand) Brendon Hartley							5	4	3	2	3	3	6	3	4	2	3	1							711
9	(New Zealand) Daynom Templeman	5	5	4	11	7	3	11	17	4	Ret	DNS	Ret	8	19	Ret	6	5	Ret	7	13	Ret	4	8	5	679
10	(New Zealand) Hamish Cross	11	Ret	16	10	Ret	Ret	15	13	12	12	6	17	9	12	Ret	Ret	11	12	9	5	3	6	7	2	629
11	(New Zealand) Andrew Higgins	12	14	11	6	17	Ret	10	12	9	Ret	12	13	Ret	11	6	9	Ret	7	11	10	7	9	19	17	610
12	(New Zealand) Ben Crighton	16	16	Ret	Ret	10	9	14	11	6	Ret	14	15	13	16	Ret	5	13	6	10	11	6	12	10	7	598
13	(Bahrain) Hamad Al Fardan	6	4	Ret	9	11	2	6	10	1	5	15	7	3	6	DNS										593
14	(New Zealand) Duane Spurdle	15	15	13	8	Ret	11	13	8	10	11	7	10	Ret	18	5	DNS	Ret	11	13	12	8	10	11	12	591
15	(New Zealand) Mark Munro	7	7	17	7	6	10	DNS	10	Ret	7	4	DNS	Ret	9	Ret	11	8	13	6	15	Ret	DNS	17	15	547
16	(New Zealand) Marc Williams	14	12	9	5	14	8	19	7	8	15	13	14	10	14	DSQ	10	14	DNS	Ret	8	Ret	DNS	16	10	543
17	(New Zealand) Ken Smith	13	13	8	15	9	Ret	17	DNS	DNS	13	9	12	14	13	DSQ	7	10	5	Ret	Ret	DNS	8	14	9	496
18	(New Zealand) Jayant Singh	Ret	17	14	Ret	12	12	16	14	Ret	Ret	Ret	16	15	17	8	Ret	15	10	DNS	14	Ret	DNS	18	DNS	320
19	(United Kingdom) Jay Howard	3	3	2				18	1	Ret																278
20	(New Zealand) Brent Collins													7	7	2										151
21	(Denmark) Steffen Møller				1	1	Ret																			150
22	(United Kingdom) Ben Clucas																						3	1	1	135
23	(New Zealand) Mark Russ																			3	Ret	Ret	7	9	13	128
24	(New Zealand) Andrew Reeves	17	18	15	12	13	Ret																			110
25	(New Zealand) Will Thomason																Ret	Ret	Ret	12	9	Ret	13	13	16	110
26	(New Zealand) Nelson Hartley										10	10	8													105
27	(New Zealand) Shannon O'Brien													11	Ret	9										66
28	(New Zealand) Chris van der Drift							9	15	Ret																58
Pos.	Driver	R1	R2	R3	R1	R2	R3	R1	R2	R3	R1	R2	R3	R1	R2	R3	R1	R2	R3	R1	R2	R3	R1	R2	R3	Points
Pos.	Driver	PUK1			RUA1			TER			TIM			RUA2			MAN			TAU			PUK2			Points
