= Wade Cunningham =

New Zealand racing driver (born 1984)

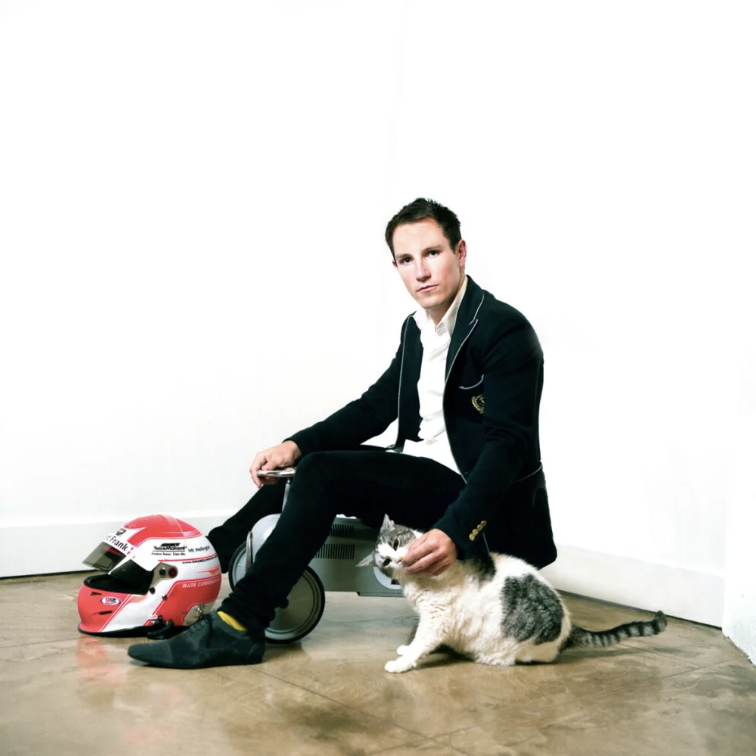
- Cunningham in 2011
- Nationality: (New Zealand) New Zealander
- Born: Wade Grant Cunningham; 19 August 1984 (age 42) Auckland, New Zealand
- Relatives: Mitch Cunningham (brother)

Firestone Indy Lights Series
- Years active: 2005–2010
- Teams: Brian Stewart Racing; AFS Racing; Alliance Motorsports; Sam Schmidt Motorsports
- Starts: 64
- Wins: 8
- Podiums: 30
- Poles: 9
- Best finish: 1st in 2005

Previous series
- 2004: Formula Ford Zetec USA

Championship titles
- 2001 2003 2005: Asia-Pacific Championship; World Karting Championship; Indy Lights Series

Wade Grant Cunningham (born 19 August 1984) is a former racing driver from Auckland, New Zealand who competed in the IndyCar Series from 2011 to 2012.

== Racing career ==
=== Indy Lights ===
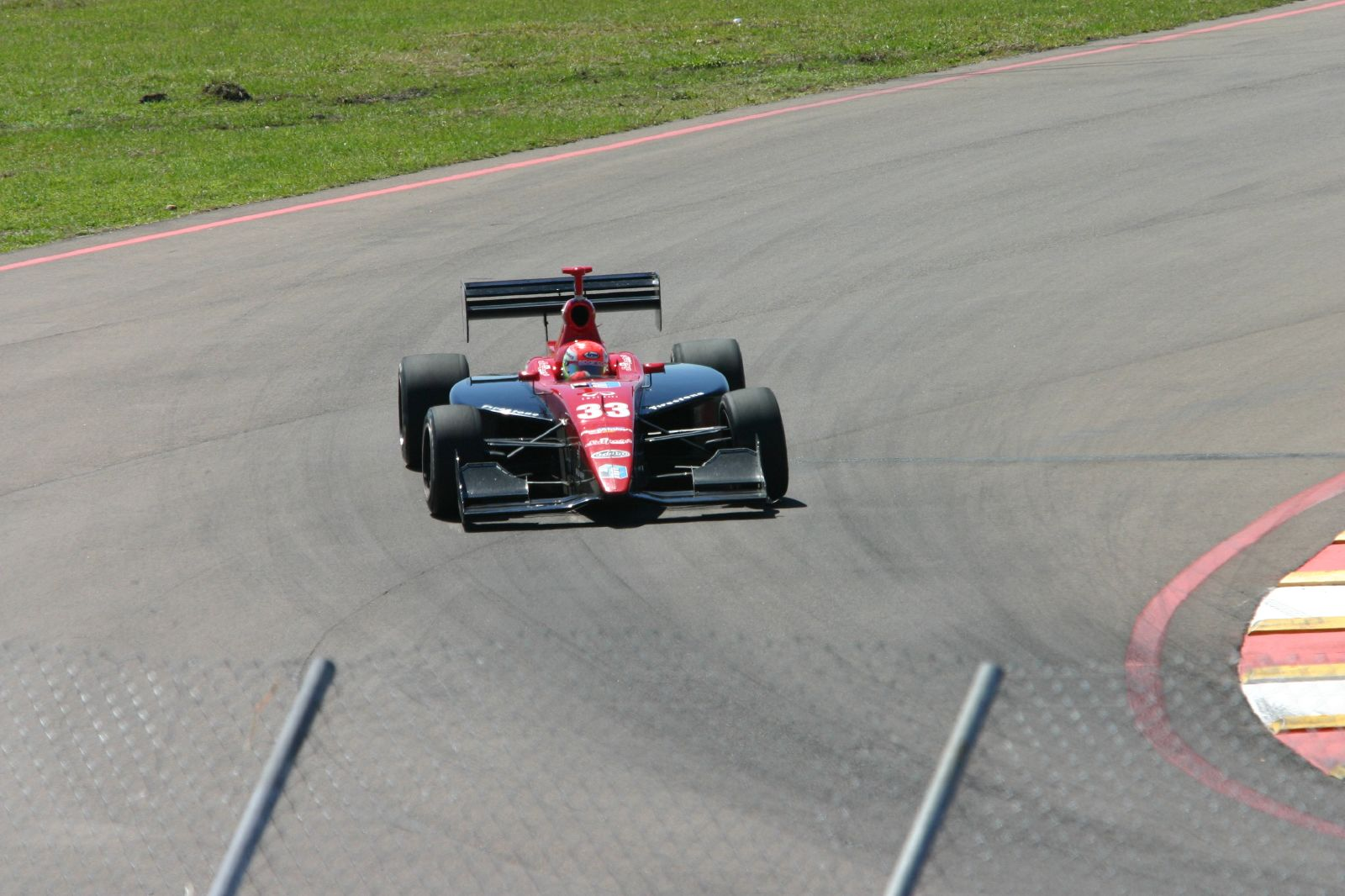
Cunningham driving his Indy Lights car on the Streets of St. Petersburg in 2005

Cunningham's professional career began when he won the Karting World Championship in 2003.

The following year, Cunningham moved to the United States and competed in the Cooper Tires Formula Ford Zetec Championship in which he finished fifth after winning four consecutive poles and seven podium finishes. He won the 2005 Indy Lights Series championship in his rookie season for Brian Stewart Racing despite only winning a single race.

Cunningham continued with the team in 2006 and won three more races, including the Freedom 100 at Indianapolis Motor Speedway (becoming the first driver from New Zealand to do so) and placed third in championship points despite missing two races due to an emergency appendectomy. While missing out on the drivers title, the team was still able to claim their second consecutive entrants championship because they were able to replace Wade with a reserve driver for those events. He narrowly missed the title by eleven points and would have easily clinched his second drivers championship had he started either of those events.

Cunningham drove in the A1 Grand Prix series as practice driver for A1 Team New Zealand in the round in Taupō, New Zealand, and China. He returned to the Indy Lights Series in 2007 for AGR-AFS Racing where he finished third.

=== IndyCar Series ===
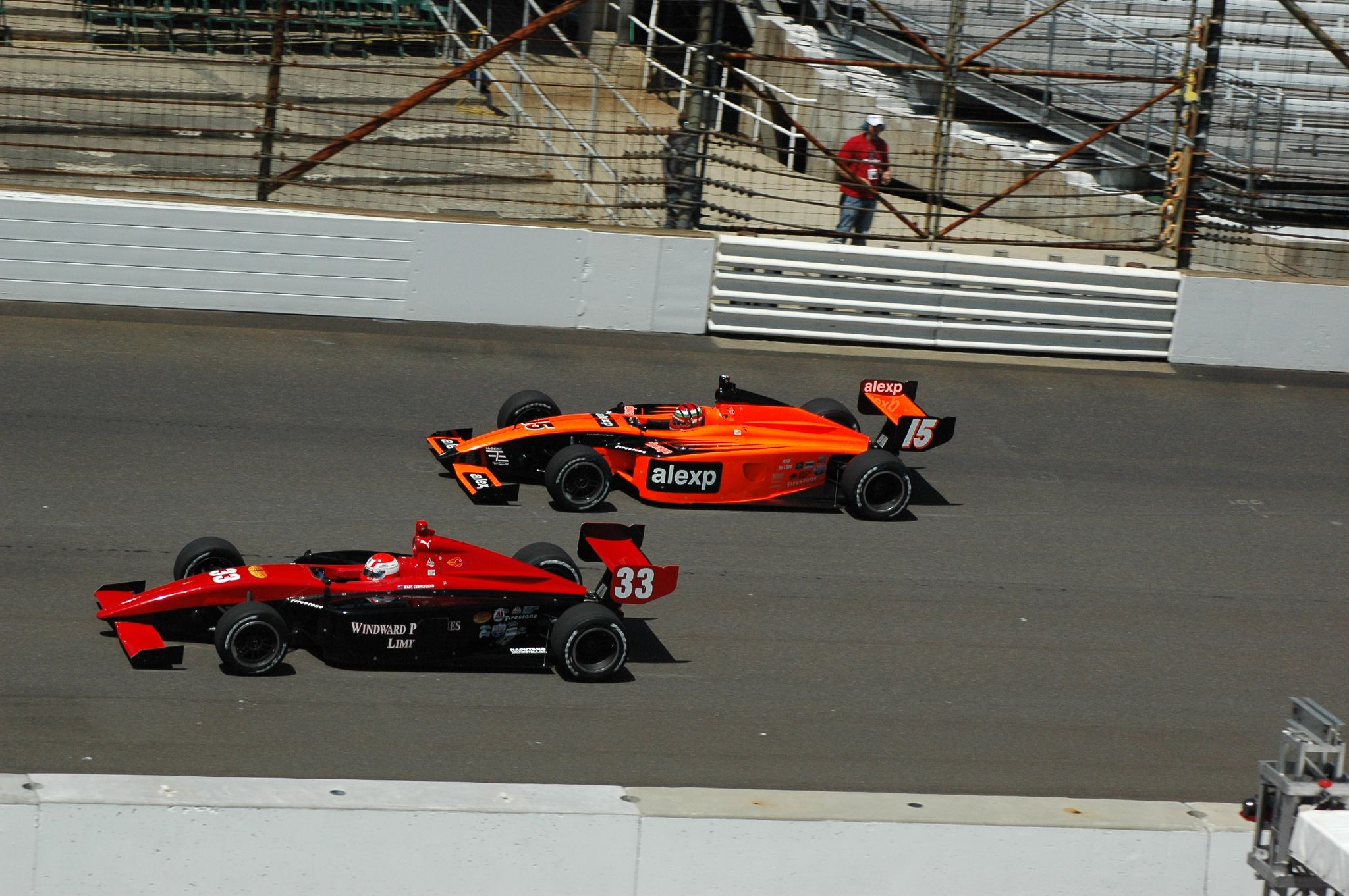
Cunningham (inside) racing in Indy Lights in 2008

In December 2007, Cunningham tested an IndyCar Series machine for the first time at Sebring as a reward for his results with their satellite team in the Indy Lights Series, driving the Andretti Green Racing IndyCar normally driven by Marco Andretti.

Cunningham's brother Mitch made his Firestone Indy Lights Series debut (formerly the Indy Pro Series) in 2008 for Brian Stewart Racing, the same team with whom Wade had his initial success. Wade made a handful of starts in the series in 2008, both for Brian Stewart and in the Mid-Ohio double-header for the new Alliance Motorsports team.

Cunningham signed on to return to the series full-time in 2009 driving for Sam Schmidt Motorsports. Upon joining the team, he became the first driver to win a second Freedom 100 at the Indianapolis Motor Speedway.

Cunningham won again that race in 2010 in a one-race deal for the Schmidt team, becoming the only three-time winner of the Freedom 100.

Sam Schmidt announced 11 February that Cunningham would make his Izod IndyCar Series debut in 2011 with Sam Schmidt Motorsports in a three race deal. He qualified eighth on debut at Texas Motor Speedway for the Firestone Texas Twin 275s and posted a season and career best IndyCar finish at the Indy Kentucky 300 when he finished seventh a mere 0.702 seconds from the lead.

Cunningham ran two races for A.J. Foyt Enterprises in 2012, the 2012 Indianapolis 500 in a second team car and the season finale after regular driver Mike Conway voluntarily sat out over safety concerns on oval tracks.

== Racing record ==
=== American open–wheel racing results ===
(key) (Races in bold indicate pole position)

==== Indy Lights ====
Year	Team	1	2	3	4	5	6	7	8	9	10	11	12	13	14	15	16	Rank	Points	Ref
2005	Brian Stewart Racing	HMS; 4	PHX; 3	STP; 2	INDY; 2	TXS; 2	IMS; 2	NSH; 4	MIL; 2	KTY; 2	PPIR; 5	SNM; 2	CHI; 10	**WGL**; 3	FON; 1			1st	504	
2006	Brian Stewart Racing	HMS; 10	STP1	STP2	**INDY**; 1	WGL; 2	IMS; 16	**NSH**; 5	**MIL**; 2	KTY; 3	**SNM1**; 1	SNM2; 4	CHI; 1					3rd	379	
2007	AGR-AFS Racing	HMS; 24	STP1; 9	STP2; 2	INDY; 23	MIL; 12	IMS1; 4	IMS2; 21	**IOW**; 2	**WGL1**; 1	WGL2; 2	NSH; 4	MOH; 2	KTY; 3	SNM1; 16	SNM2; 11	CHI; 17	3rd	423	
2008	Brian Stewart Racing	HMS; 9	STP1	STP2	KAN; 5	INDY; 3	MIL; 12	IOW	WGL1	WGL2	NSH							19th	169	
2008	Alliance Motorsports											MOH1; 12	MOH2; 2	KTY	SNM1	SNM2		19th	169	
2008	Integra Motorsports w/ CGRT																CHI; 24	19th	169	
2009	Sam Schmidt Motorsports	STP1; 16	STP2; 11	LBH; 20	**KAN**; 2	**INDY**; 1	MIL; 6	IOW; 2	WGL; 19	TOR; 7	EDM; 6	KTY; 1	MOH; 14	SNM; 12	CHI; 4	HMS; 6		4th	416	
2010	Sam Schmidt Motorsports	STP	ALA	LBH	INDY; 1	IOW	WGL	TOR	EDM	MOH	SNM	CHI	KTY	HMS; 3				15th	87	

==== IndyCar Series ====
Year	Team	No.	Chassis	Engine	1	2	3	4	5	6	7	8	9	10	11	12	13	14	15	16	17	18	Rank	Points	Ref
2011	Sam Schmidt Motorsports	99	Dallara	Honda	STP	ALA	LBH	SAO	INDY	TXS1; 29	TXS2; 20	MIL	IOW	TOR	EDM	MOH	NHM	SNM	BAL	MOT			37th	36	
2011	Sam Schmidt Motorsports	17	Dallara	Honda																	KTY; 7	LVS; C	37th	36	
2012	A. J. Foyt Enterprises	41	Dallara DW12	Honda	STP	ALA	LBH	SAO	INDY; 31	DET	TXS	MIL	IOW	TOR	EDM	MOH	SNM	BAL					28th	29	
2012	A. J. Foyt Enterprises	14	Dallara DW12	Honda															FON; 14				28th	29	

==== Indianapolis 500 ====
Year	Chassis	Engine	Start	Finish	Team
2012	Dallara	Honda	26	31	A. J. Foyt Enterprises

=== Complete A1 Grand Prix results ===
Year	Entrant	1	2	3	4	5	6	7	8	9	10	11	12	13	14	15	16	17	18	19	20	21	22	DC	Points	Ref
2006–07	New Zealand	NED; SPR	NED; FEA	CZE; SPR	CZE; FEA	BEI; SPR	BEI; FEA	MYS; SPR	MYS; FEA	IDN; SPR	IDN; FEA	NZL; SPR; PO	NZL; FEA; PO	AUS; SPR	AUS; FEA	RSA; SPR	RSA; FEA	MEX; SPR	MEX; FEA	SHA; SPR; PO	SHA; FEA; PO	GBR; SPR	GBR; SPR	**2nd**	**93**	

Sporting positions
Preceded by Thiago Medeiros	Infiniti Pro Series Champion; 2005	Succeeded by Jay Howard
