= Fabrizio Crestani =

Italian racing driver

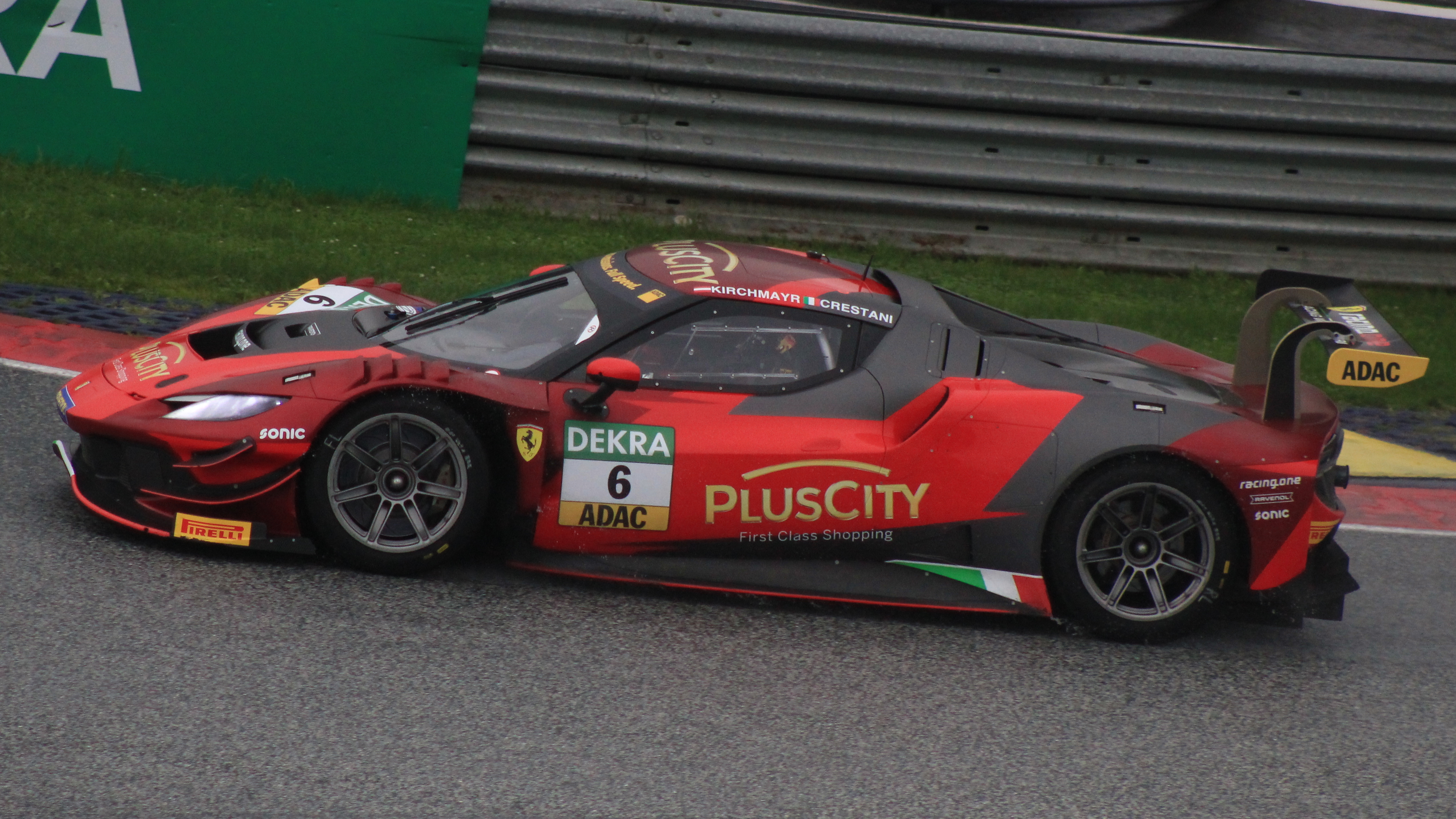
- Nationality: (Italy) Italian
- Born: 17 December 1987 (age 38)

GP2 Series career
- Debut season: 2010
- Current team: Venezuela GP Lazarus
- Categorisation: FIA Silver
- Car number: 18
- Former teams: David Price Racing
- Starts: 29
- Wins: 0
- Poles: 0
- Fastest laps: 0
- Best finish: 24th in 2013

Previous series
- 2008–10, 13 2008–09 2008 2005–07 2006 2005: Auto GP; GP2 Asia Series; International Formula Master; Italian F3; British F3 National Class; Formula 1600 Junior Italia

Fabrizio Crestani (born 17 December 1987) is an Italian racing driver.

== Career ==
Having competed in karts until 2005, Crestani moved up to the Formula Junior 1600 Italia championship, finishing in fourth place in the championship, driving for PSR Motorsport. Crestani had one win and finished behind Pasquale Di Sabatino, Mihai Marinescu and Jaime Alguersuari in the championship. He also made his debut in the Italian Formula Three Championship for Corbetta Competizioni at the final round at the Misano World Circuit. Having qualified seventh for both races, Fabrizio recorded a sixth and a seventh from the two races, allowing him to finish 13th in the championship.

Crestani moved up full-time to Italian F3 for 2006, continuing with Corbetta Competizioni. Over the course of the season, he recorded one pole position at Vallelunga, and five podiums (four of which being second places) on his way to fifth in the championship. He also made an appearance in the British Formula 3 Championship when the series visited Mugello. Driving in the Invitational Class, he finished both races outside of the points recording a 15th and a 14th with lap times matching the National Class runners.

A third season of Italian F3 followed, again with Corbetta. Having recorded two more pole positions at Misano, Crestani finally recorded his first wins in the championship at Mugello, leading home 2008 champion Mirko Bortolotti in both races. A third win would follow later in the year at Vallelunga, but Crestani could not improve on his championship position from 2006 by again finishing fifth, 41 points behind champion Paolo Maria Nocera.

Crestani would not return to the series for 2008, instead moving to the Euroseries 3000 championship for GP Racing. Again, a fifth place championship position was the net result of the season including wins at Mugello, and a double at the Magione season finale. He finished 8th in the counterpart Italian series, which ran at the same time as the Euro series, at four of the first five rounds. He also forayed into the International Formula Master series, racing at Valencia, Pau and Brno for Euronova Racing. His best finish was first in the race at Pau – holding off champion Chris van der Drift by 0.058 seconds, giving him a total of 0.5 points in the championship.

After Tiago Monteiro acquired the former BCN Competición team and renamed it as Ocean Racing Technology, Monteiro replaced both drivers from round one (Hiroki Yoshimoto and Luca Filippi), hiring Yelmer Buurman and Crestani to be the drivers to replace them from round two of the 2008–09 GP2 Asia Series season onwards. He scored no points and finished 28th in the championship. He resumed his Euroseries career with the TP Formula team, although he then switched to the Emmebi Motorsport outfit for the final round of the championship. He took six podium finishes, a pole position and a fastest lap from the 13 races to finish fourth in the championship and fifth in the concurrent Italian F3000 championship.

Crestani had a fragmented 2010, competing four races in Auto GP for the DAMS and Trident teams, and six races for David Price Racing in the main GP2 Series after replacing Giacomo Ricci in the team. Due to lack of sponsorship, Crestani then undertook a full 2011 season in Auto GP with the Lazarus team alongside compatriot Fabio Onidi; he finished fourth in the championship.

Crestani remained with Lazarus as the team made its GP2 Series début in 2012, and was partnered by Giancarlo Serenelli.

In 2023, after a year away from the series, Crestani returned to the GT World Challenge Europe Endurance Cup, driving alongside Ricky Capo and Sam Neary for GRT Grasser Racing Team.

== Racing record ==
=== Career summary ===
Season	Series	Team	Races	Wins	Poles	F/Laps	Podiums	Points	Position
2005	Formula Junior 1600 Italy	PSR Motorsport	12	1	?	?	4	141	4th
2005	Italian Formula 3 Championship	Corbetta	2	0	0	0	0	10	13th
2006	Italian Formula 3 Championship	Corbetta Competizioni	16	0	1	2	5	76	5th
2006	British Formula 3 Championship - National Class	Corbetta Competizioni	2	0	0	0	1	20	17th
2007	Italian Formula 3 Championship	Corbetta Competizioni	16	3	2	3	7	73	5th
2008	Euroseries 3000	GP Racing	10	3	0	1	5	49	5th
2008	Italian Formula 3000	GP Racing	4	1	0	1	1	15	9th
2008	International Formula Master	Euronova Racing	6	0	0	0	0	0.5	27th
2008–09	GP2 Asia Series	Ocean Racing Technology	9	0	0	0	0	0	28th
2009	Euroseries 3000	TP Formula	12	0	1	2	6	54	4th
2009	Italian Formula 3000	TP Formula	6	0	0	1	2	26	5th
2010	GP2 Series	DPR	6	0	0	0	0	0	30th
2010	Auto GP	DAMS	2	0	0	0	0	0	22nd
2010	Auto GP	Trident Racing	2	0	0	0	0	0	22nd
2011	Auto GP	Lazarus	14	1	0	0	4	92	6th
2012	GP2 Series	Venezuela GP Lazarus	14	0	0	0	0	1	24th
2013	GP2 Series	Venezuela GP Lazarus	4	0	0	0	0	0	33rd
2013	Auto GP	Ibiza Racing Team	2	0	0	0	0	11	17th
2015	Lamborghini Super Trofeo Europe	Team Lazarus	11	0	0	1	5	84	4th
2016	International GT Open	Orange 1 Team Lazarus	14	2	0	0	9	114	**1st**
2016	International GT Open - Pro-Am	Orange 1 Team Lazarus	14	1	3	2	8	78	**1st**
2017	Blancpain GT Series Sprint Cup	Orange 1 Team Lazarus	8	0	0	0	0	0	NC
2017	Blancpain GT Series Sprint Cup - Silver Cup	Orange 1 Team Lazarus	4	0	0	0	2	34	7th
2017	Blancpain GT Series Endurance Cup	Orange 1 Team Lazarus	5	0	0	0	0	0	NC
2017	Intercontinental GT Challenge	Orange 1 Team Lazarus	1	0	0	0	0	0	NC
2018	International GT Open	Daiko Lazarus Racing	14	0	0	0	1	28	16th
2018	International GT Open - Pro-Am	Daiko Lazarus Racing	14	0	0	0	8	78	**2nd**
2018	Blancpain GT Series Endurance Cup	Daiko Lazarus Racing	5	0	0	0	0	0	NC
2018	Blancpain GT Series Endurance Cup - Pro-Am	Daiko Lazarus Racing	4	1	0	0	1	49	6th
2018	Blancpain GT Series Endurance Cup - Silver Cup	Daiko Lazarus Racing	1	0	0	0	0	7	19th
2019	International GT Open	SPS Automotive Performance	14	1	0	2	5	92	5th
2019	Blancpain GT Series Endurance Cup	Daiko Lazarus Racing	2	0	0	0	0	0	NC
2019	Blancpain GT Series Endurance Cup - Silver Cup	Daiko Lazarus Racing	2	0	0	0	0	0	NC
2020	International GT Open	Team Lazarus	10	1	2	2	4	80	4th
2021	International GT Open	Rinaldi Racing	2	1	0	0	1	23	15th
2021	GT World Challenge Europe Endurance Cup	Rinaldi Racing							
2022	European Le Mans Series - LMGTE	Rinaldi Racing	4	0	0	0	0	10	20th
2023	GT World Challenge Europe Endurance Cup	GRT Grasser Racing Team	5	0	0	0	0	0	NC
2023	GT World Challenge Europe Endurance Cup - Silver Cup	GRT Grasser Racing Team	5	1	1	0	2	53	6th
2023	24H GT Series - GT3	MP Racing							
2024	GT World Challenge Europe Endurance Cup	Rinaldi Racing	1	0	0	0	0	0	NC
2024	ADAC GT Masters	racing one	2	0	0	1	0	0	NC†
2025	GT World Challenge Europe Endurance Cup	Rinaldi Racing	1	0	0	0	0	0	NC
2025	ADAC GT Masters	Baron Motorsport	2	0	0	0	0	0	NC†
2025	Italian GT Championship Endurance Cup - GT3	Barone Rampante	2	0	0	0	0	6	NC

=== Complete GP2 Series results ===
(key) (Races in bold indicate pole position) (Races in italics indicate fastest lap)

Year	Entrant	1	2	3	4	5	6	7	8	9	10	11	12	13	14	15	16	17	18	19	20	21	22	23	24	DC	Points
2010	DPR	CAT; FEA	CAT; SPR	MON; FEA	MON; SPR	IST; FEA	IST; SPR	VAL; FEA	VAL; SPR	SIL; FEA	SIL; SPR	HOC; FEA	HOC; SPR	HUN; FEA	HUN; SPR	SPA; FEA; Ret	SPA; SPR; 14	MNZ; FEA; 10	MNZ; SPR; 15	YMC; FEA; 13	YMC; SPR; 14					30th	0
2012	Venezuela GP Lazarus	SEP; FEA; 10	SEP; SPR; 21	BHR1; FEA; 14	BHR1; SPR; 19	BHR2; FEA; Ret	BHR2; SPR; 23	CAT; FEA; 17	CAT; SPR; 10	MON; FEA; 19	MON; SPR; Ret	VAL; FEA; Ret	VAL; SPR; DNS	SIL; FEA; 11	SIL; SPR; 22	HOC; FEA	HOC; SPR	HUN; FEA	HUN; SPR	SPA; FEA	SPA; SPR	MNZ; FEA	MNZ; SPR	MRN; FEA	MRN; SPR	24th	1
2013	Venezuela GP Lazarus	SEP; FEA	SEP; SPR	BHR; FEA	BHR; SPR	CAT; FEA	CAT; SPR	MON; FEA	MON; SPR	SIL; FEA; 18	SIL; SPR; 17	NÜR; FEA; 19	NÜR; SPR; 21	HUN; FEA	HUN; SPR	SPA; FEA	SPA; SPR	MNZ; FEA	MNZ; SPR	MRN; FEA	MRN; SPR	YMC; FEA	YMC; SPR			33rd	0

==== Complete GP2 Asia Series results ====
(key) (Bold indicates pole position, * indicates fastest lap)

Year	Entrant	1	2	3	4	5	6	7	8	9	10	11	12	DC	Points
2008–09	Ocean Racing Technology	SHI; FEA	SHI; SPR	DUB; FEA; 14	DUB; SPR; C	BHR; FEA; Ret	BHR; SPR; 17	LSL; FEA; 10	LSL; SPR; 21	SEP; FEA; 15	SEP; SPR; 16	BHR; FEA; 18	BHR; SPR; 15	28th	0

=== Complete Auto GP results ===
(key) (Races in bold indicate pole position) (Races in italics indicate fastest lap)

Year	Entrant	1	2	3	4	5	6	7	8	9	10	11	12	13	14	15	16	Pos	Points
2010	DAMS	BRN; 1	BRN; 2	IMO; 1 Ret	IMO; 2; 7													22nd	0
2010	Trident Racing					SPA; 1; 11	SPA; 2; 8	MAG; 1 DNS	MAG; 2 DNS	NAV; 1	NAV; 2	MNZ; 1	MNZ; 2					22nd	0
2011	Lazarus	MNZ; 1 Ret	MNZ; 2; 9	HUN; 1; 7	HUN; 2; 14	BRN; 1; 2	BRN; 2; 4	DON; 1; 3	DON; 2; 3	**OSC**; **1** Ret	OSC; 2; 9	VAL; 1; 4	VAL; 2; 5	MUG; 1; 7	MUG; 2; 3			6th	92
2013	Ibiza Racing Team	MNZ; 1	MNZ; 2	MAR; 1	MAR; 2	HUN; 1	HUN; 2	SIL; 1; 5	SIL; 2; 10	MUG; 1	MUG; 2	NÜR; 1	NÜR; 2	DON; 1	DON; 2	BRN; 1	BRN; 2	17th	11

=== Complete Blancpain GT Series Sprint Cup results ===
Year	Team	Car	Class	1	2	3	4	5	6	7	8	9	10	Pos.	Points
2017	Orange 1 Team Lazarus	Lamborghini Huracán GT3	Pro	MIS; QR; 15	MIS; CR; 17	BRH; QR; 21	BRH; CR; 15	ZOL; QR	ZOL; CR					NC	0
2017	Orange 1 Team Lazarus	Lamborghini Huracán GT3	Silver							HUN; QR; 23	HUN; CR; 23	NÜR; QR; 25	NÜR; CR; 23	7th	34

=== Complete European Le Mans Series results ===
(key) (Races in bold indicate pole position; results in italics indicate fastest lap)

Year	Entrant	Class	Chassis	Engine	1	2	3	4	5	6	Rank	Points
2022	Rinaldi Racing	LMGTE	Ferrari 488 GTE Evo	Ferrari F154CB 3.9 L Turbo V8	LEC; 11	IMO; 6	MNZ; 9	CAT	SPA; WD	ALG; Ret	20th	10
