= 2006 Italian Formula Three Championship =

Seasons
- ← 2005 2007 →

The 2006 Italian Formula Three Championship was the 42nd Italian Formula Three Championship season. It began on 9 April at Adria and ended on 22 October at Misano after 16 races.

Mauro Massironi of Passoli Racing dominated the season with a win at Magione and another eight successive wins at Vallelunga, Mugello, Varano, and Pergusa and ultimately clinched the title. He finished 28 points clear of Corbetta Competizioni driver Davide Rigon, who won the opening race at Adria, a race at Magione and both of the season-ending races at Misano. Third place went to Lucidi Motors driver Alex Frassineti, who took one victory, and he finished ahead of Imola winner Michele Rugolo, who competed with Team Ghinzani.

== Teams and drivers ==
All teams were Italian-registered and all cars competed on Michelin tyres.

Entry List
Team	No	Driver	Chassis	Engine	Rounds
Campionato Nazionale
Corbetta Competizioni	1	(Italy) Fabrizio Crestani	Dallara F302	Spiess-Opel	All
Corbetta Competizioni	2	(Italy) Federico Glorioso	Dallara F302	Spiess-Opel	All
Corbetta Competizioni	11	(Italy) Davide Rigon	Dallara F302	Spiess-Opel	All
Lucidi Motors	3	(Italy) Giuseppe Terranova	Dallara F302	Spiess-Opel	All
Lucidi Motors	4	(Italy) Alex Frassineti	Dallara F302	Spiess-Opel	All
Europa Corse	6	(Italy) Efisio Marchese	Dallara F302	Spiess-Opel	All
Passoli Racing	7	(Italy) Manuele Maria Gatto	Dallara F302	Spiess-Opel	7–8
Passoli Racing	8	(Italy) Mauro Massironi	Dallara F302	Spiess-Opel	All
Scuderia N.T.	12	(Italy) Jacopo Faccioni	Dallara F302	Spiess-Opel	All
En.Ro. Competition	14	(Bulgaria) Vladimir Arabadzhiev	Dallara F302	Spiess-Opel	1–2, 4–8
Team Ghinzani	22	(Italy) Manuele Maria Gatto	Dallara F302	Mugen-Honda	1–6
Team Ghinzani	24	(Italy) Michele Rugolo	Dallara F302	Mugen-Honda	All
Team Ghinzani	26	(Italy) Paolo Bossini	Dallara F302	Mugen-Honda	7–8
Trofeo Nazionale CSAI
Style Car Racing	51	(Italy) Imeiro Brigliadori	Dallara F302	Spiess-Opel	All
Style Car Racing	52	(Italy) Gianpiero Negrotti	Dallara F302	Spiess-Opel	All
System Team	53	(Italy) Sergio Ghiotto	Dallara F302	Spiess-Opel	1–6
System Team	84	(Italy) Dino Lusuardi	Dallara F393	Fiat	1–7
System Team	97	(Italy) Rinaldo Nieri	Dallara F399	Spiess-Opel	5
Auto Elite	55	(Italy) Giovanni Rambelli	Dallara F302	Spiess-Opel	1–6, 8
Auto Elite	56	(Italy) Molin Pradel	Dallara F302	Spiess-Opel	2, 7
Lido Corse	81	(Italy) Luciano Baldazzi	Ralt R34	Volkswagen	1–2, 6
Lido Corse	94	(Italy) Andrea Vazzacaro	Dallara F399	Spiess-Opel	3
Beelspeed	82	(Italy) Bonifacio Gaetani	Dallara F399	Spiess-Opel	All
Beelspeed	83	(Italy) Giovanni Gaetani	Dallara F399	Fiat	All
Beelspeed	93	(Italy) Carlo Bendinelli	Dallara F392	Volkswagen	1–2, 4–8
Master Team	86	(Italy) Flavio Mattara	Dallara F393	Fiat	2–6, 8
Cherubini Racing	89	(Italy) Piergiorgio di Gianvito	Dallara F397	Fiat	2
Cherubini Racing	91	(Italy) Luigi Folloni	Dallara F392	Volkswagen	2, 5, 7–8
Cherubini Racing	96	(Italy) Salvatore Cardullo	Dallara F397	Fiat	3, 6
B&B Motorsport	92	(Italy) Massimo Ballestri	Dallara F392	Volkswagen	2, 5, 7–8

== Calendar ==
All rounds were held in Italy.

Round		Circuit	Date	Pole position	Fastest lap	Winning driver	Winning team	Trofeo winner
1	R1	Adria International Raceway	9 April	(Italy) Alex Frassineti	(Italy) Davide Rigon	(Italy) Davide Rigon	Corbetta Competizioni	(Italy) Imeiro Brigliadori
1	R2	Adria International Raceway	9 April	(Italy) Alex Frassineti	(Italy) Mauro Massironi	(Italy) Alex Frassineti	Lucidi Motors	(Italy) Imeiro Brigliadori
2	R1	Autodromo Enzo e Dino Ferrari	7 May	(Italy) Michele Rugolo	(Italy) Fabrizio Crestani	(Italy) Michele Rugolo	Team Ghinzani	(Italy) Imeiro Brigliadori
2	R2	Autodromo Enzo e Dino Ferrari	7 May	(Italy) Alex Frassineti	(Italy) Mauro Massironi	(Italy) Michele Rugolo	Team Ghinzani	(Italy) Sergio Ghiotto
3	R1	Autodromo dell'Umbria	11 June	(Italy) Mauro Massironi	(Italy) Davide Rigon	(Italy) Mauro Massironi	Passoli Racing	(Italy) Sergio Ghiotto
3	R2	Autodromo dell'Umbria	11 June	(Italy) Mauro Massironi	(Italy) Davide Rigon	(Italy) Davide Rigon	Corbetta Competizioni	(Italy) Imeiro Brigliadori
4	R1	ACI Vallelunga Circuit	25 June	(Italy) Fabrizio Crestani	(Italy) Michele Rugolo	(Italy) Mauro Massironi	Passoli Racing	(Italy) Imeiro Brigliadori
4	R2	ACI Vallelunga Circuit	25 June	(Italy) Mauro Massironi	(Italy) Alex Frassineti	(Italy) Mauro Massironi	Passoli Racing	(Italy) Imeiro Brigliadori
5	R1	Mugello Circuit	23 July	(Italy) Davide Rigon	(Italy) Davide Rigon	(Italy) Mauro Massironi	Passoli Racing	(Italy) Imeiro Brigliadori
5	R2	Mugello Circuit	23 July	(Italy) Mauro Massironi	(Italy) Giuseppe Terranova	(Italy) Mauro Massironi	Passoli Racing	(Italy) Massimo Ballestri
6	R1	Autodromo Riccardo Paletti	3 September	(Italy) Mauro Massironi	(Italy) Mauro Massironi	(Italy) Mauro Massironi	Passoli Racing	(Italy) Imeiro Brigliadori
6	R2	Autodromo Riccardo Paletti	3 September	(Italy) Mauro Massironi	(Italy) Mauro Massironi	(Italy) Mauro Massironi	Passoli Racing	(Italy) Imeiro Brigliadori
7	R1	Autodromo di Pergusa	1 October	(Italy) Mauro Massironi	(Italy) Davide Rigon	(Italy) Mauro Massironi	Passoli Racing	(Italy) Imeiro Brigliadori
7	R2	Autodromo di Pergusa	1 October	(Italy) Mauro Massironi	(Italy) Davide Rigon	(Italy) Mauro Massironi	Passoli Racing	(Italy) Imeiro Brigliadori
8	R1	Misano World Circuit	22 October	(Italy) Davide Rigon	(Italy) Fabrizio Crestani	(Italy) Davide Rigon	Corbetta Competizioni	(Italy) Imeiro Brigliadori
8	R2	Misano World Circuit	22 October	(Italy) Giuseppe Terranova	(Italy) Alex Frassineti	(Italy) Davide Rigon	Corbetta Competizioni	(Italy) Imeiro Brigliadori

== Standings ==
=== Campionato Nazionale ===
- Points are awarded as follows:

1	2	3	4	5	6	7	8	PP	FL
10	8	6	5	4	3	2	1	**1**	1

Pos	Driver	ADR		IMO		MAG		VLL		MUG		VAR		PER		MIS		Pts
1	(Italy) Mauro Massironi	3	3	2	2	**1**	**8**	1	**1**	1	**1**	**1**	**1**	**1**	**1**	7	4	139
2	(Italy) Davide Rigon	1	2	5	5	16	1	4	4	**Ret**	2	3	3	2	2	**1**	1	111
3	(Italy) Alex Frassineti	**4**	**1**	4	**3**	2	5	7	6	5	3	2	2	4	5	2	7	93
4	(Italy) Michele Rugolo	2	7	**1**	1	4	2	3	3	3	4	16†	15†	5	14	Ret	3	78
5	(Italy) Fabrizio Crestani	Ret	4	3	4	6	9	**2**	2	2	5	8	4	6	6	5	2	76
6	(Italy) Efisio Marchese	5	6	6	8	Ret	3	6	7	9	8	4	Ret	3	3	3	5	51
7	(Italy) Giuseppe Terranova	7	5	Ret	6	3	16	5	8	6	6	Ret	5	18†	4	4	**DSQ**	42
8	(Italy) Manuele Maria Gatto	9	9	9	7	5	6	8	5	4	7	Ret	7	Ret	Ret	8	6	31
9	(Italy) Federico Glorioso	6	Ret	8	10	7	4	12	11	7	11	6	Ret	8	7	10	9	22
10	(Italy) Jacopo Faccioni	10	10	10	9	Ret	10	10	10	11	9	7	8	10	15	6	13	8
11	(Bulgaria) Vladimir Arabadzhiev	12	11	11	12			13	12	12	10	10	9	7	9	Ret	10	5
	(Italy) Paolo Bossini													Ret	10	Ret	16	0
Pos	Driver	ADR		IMO		MAG		VLL		MUG		VAR		PER		MIS		Pts

Colour	Result
Gold	Winner
Silver	Second place
Bronze	Third place
Green	Points classification
Blue	Non-points classification
Blue	Non-classified finish (NC)
Purple	Retired, not classified (Ret)
Red	Did not qualify (DNQ)
Red	Did not pre-qualify (DNPQ)
Black	Disqualified (DSQ)
White	Did not start (DNS)
White	Withdrew (WD)
White	Race cancelled (C)
Blank	Did not practice (DNP)
Blank	Did not arrive (DNA)
Blank	Excluded (EX)

**Bold** – Pole
Italics – Fastest Lap
