= 2004 Italian Formula Three Championship =

Italian motor racing championship

Seasons
- ← 2003 2005 →

The 2004 Italian Formula Three Championship was the 40th Italian Formula Three Championship season. It began on 4 April at Adria and ended on 24 October at Misano after fourteen races.

Matteo Cressoni of Ombra Racing won the opening race at Adria, race at Pergusa and had another six podiums and ultimately clinched the title. Coloni Motorsport's Toni Vilander had six wins and the same number of points as Cressoni, but he was ineligible to contest for the title. Third place went to Lucidi Motors driver Alex Frassineti, who took one victory, and he finished ahead of Imola winner Michele Rugolo, who competed with Team Ghinzani.

== Teams and drivers ==
All teams were Italian-registered and all cars competed on Hankook tyres.

Entry List
Team	No	Driver	Chassis	Engine	Rounds
Target Racing	1	(Italy) Andrea Tiso	Dallara F304	Spiess-Opel	All
Target Racing	2	(Italy) Alex Ciompi	Dallara F304	Spiess-Opel	1–7
Corbetta Angelo	3	(Italy) Stefano Gattuso	Dallara F304	Mugen-Honda	All
Corbetta Angelo	4	(Italy) Giovanni Faraonio	Dallara F304	Mugen-Honda	3–10
Corbetta Angelo	4	(Italy) Marco Bonanomi	Dallara F304	Mugen-Honda	11–14
Corbetta Angelo	22	(Italy) Francesco Dracone	Dallara F303	Mugen-Honda	8–10
Corbetta Angelo	34	(Italy) Davide Valsecchi	Dallara F304	Mugen-Honda	11–12
Lucidi Motors	5	(Italy) Michele Rugolo	Dallara F302	Spiess-Opel	All
Lucidi Motors	6	(Italy) Omar Galeffi	Dallara F302	Spiess-Opel	1–3
Lucidi Motors	6	(Italy) Paolo Maria Nocera	Dallara F302	Spiess-Opel	8–14
W&D Racing	7	(San Marino) Paolo Meloni	Dallara F303	Renault	1–2, 4–5
Passoli Racing	8	(Italy) Maurizio Ceresoli	Dallara F303	Spiess-Opel	All
Ombra Racing	11	(Italy) Matteo Cressoni	Dallara F304	Mugen-Honda	All
Ombra Racing	12	(Italy) Davide Mazzoleni	Dallara F304	Mugen-Honda	1–3, 9–10
W.R.C.	15	(Italy) Davide Rigon	Dallara F302	Spiess-Opel	1–7, 9–10
W.R.C.	29	(Italy) Franco Ghiotto	Dallara F302	Spiess-Opel	1
W.R.C.	31	(Italy) Sergio Ghiotto	Dallara F302	Spiess-Opel	9–10
Style Car Racing	19	(Italy) Gianpiero Negrotti	Dallara F303	Spiess-Opel	6–7
Style Car Racing	21	(Italy) Giovanni Berton	Dallara F303	Spiess-Opel	1
Style Car Racing	24	(Italy) Imeiro Brigliadori	Dallara F302	Spiess-Opel	6–7
Style Car Racing	28	(Italy) Giovanni Rambelli	Dallara F399	Spiess-Opel	6–7
Motivi Team	22	(Italy) Francesco Dracone	Dallara F302	Spiess-Opel	1
System Team	25	(Italy) Alberto Morelli	Dallara F302	Spiess-Opel	2
Coloni Motorsport	27	(Finland) Toni Vilander	Lola-Dome F106	Spiess-Opel	4–14
Coloni Motorsport	28	(Italy) Alex Ciompi	Lola-Dome F106	Spiess-Opel	8–14
Team Ghinzani	32	(Italy) Marco Bonanomi	Dallara F302	Mugen-Honda	9–10
Team Ghinzani	33	(Germany) Daniel la Rosa	Dallara F302	Mugen-Honda	9–10
Team Ghinzani	34	(Spain) Álvaro Barba	Dallara F302	Mugen-Honda	13–14

== Calendar ==
All rounds were held in Italy.

Round	Circuit	Date	Pole position	Fastest lap	Winning driver	Winning team
1	Adria International Raceway	4 April	(Italy) Alex Ciompi	(Italy) Alex Ciompi	(Italy) Matteo Cressoni	Ombra Racing
2	Autodromo dell'Umbria, Magione	2 May	(Italy) Michele Rugolo	(Italy) Michele Rugolo	(Italy) Stefano Gattuso	Corbetta Angelo
3	Autodromo di Pergusa, Enna	30 May	(Italy) Stefano Gattuso	(Italy) Stefano Gattuso	(Italy) Matteo Cressoni	Ombra Racing
4	Mugello Circuit, Scarperia	11 July	(Finland) Toni Vilander	(Finland) Toni Vilander	(Finland) Toni Vilander	Coloni Motorsport
5	Mugello Circuit, Scarperia	11 July	(Finland) Toni Vilander	(Finland) Toni Vilander	(Finland) Toni Vilander	Coloni Motorsport
6	Autodromo Enzo e Dino Ferrari, Imola	1 August	(Finland) Toni Vilander	(Finland) Toni Vilander	(Finland) Toni Vilander	Coloni Motorsport
7	Autodromo Enzo e Dino Ferrari, Imola	1 August	(Finland) Toni Vilander	(Finland) Toni Vilander	(Finland) Toni Vilander	Coloni Motorsport
8	Autodromo Riccardo Paletti, Varano	5 September	(Finland) Toni Vilander	(Finland) Toni Vilander	(Finland) Toni Vilander	Coloni Motorsport
9	Autodromo Nazionale Monza	26 September	(Italy) Marco Bonanomi	(Italy) Michele Rugolo	(Italy) Marco Bonanomi	Team Ghinzani
10	Autodromo Nazionale Monza	26 September	(Italy) Marco Bonanomi	(Germany) Daniel la Rosa	(Italy) Marco Bonanomi	Team Ghinzani
11	ACI Vallelunga Circuit, Campagnano di Roma	10 October	(Finland) Toni Vilander	(Italy) Alex Ciompi	(Italy) Marco Bonanomi	Corbetta Angelo
12	ACI Vallelunga Circuit, Campagnano di Roma	10 October	(Finland) Toni Vilander	(Finland) Toni Vilander	(Finland) Toni Vilander	Coloni Motorsport
13	Misano World Circuit	24 October	(Italy) Matteo Cressoni	(Italy) Michele Rugolo	(Italy) Michele Rugolo	Lucidi Motors
14	Misano World Circuit	24 October	(Italy) Paolo Maria Nocera	(Italy) Alex Ciompi	(Italy) Alex Ciompi	Coloni Motorsport

== Standings ==
- Points are awarded as follows:

1	2	3	4	5	6	7	8	9	10	PP	FL
20	15	12	10	8	6	4	3	2	1	**1**	1

Pos	Driver	ADR	MAG	PER	MUG		IMO		VAR	MNZ		VLL		MIS		Pts
1	(Italy) Matteo Cressoni	1	Ret	1	3	2	2	2	2	Ret	3	4	8	**Ret**	5	146
2	(Finland) Toni Vilander (Note: Ineligible for championship title contesting.)				**1**	**1**	**1**	**1**	**1**	Ret	4	**Ret**	**1**	Ret	8	146
3	(Italy) Alex Ciompi	**2**	4	2	7	6	6	3	5	Ret	8	2	6	2	1	139
4	(Italy) Michele Rugolo	3	**Ret**	Ret	2	7	3	5	3	3	Ret	6	2	1	2	135
5	(Italy) Stefano Gattuso	Ret	1	**4**	5	4	5	6	7	4	7	3	7	4	7	112
6	(Italy) Marco Bonanomi									**1**	**1**	1	4	5	7	86
7	(Italy) Andrea Tiso	4	3	5	8	8	9	8	4	Ret	6	7	5	6	4	85
8	(Italy) Davide di Benedetto			Ret	6	3	4	4	6	5	10					53
9	(Italy) Maurizio Ceresoli	9	6	Ret	9	9	8	9	8	6	9	8	9	7	3	49
10	(Italy) Davide Mazzoleni	7	2	6						Ret	5					33
11	(Italy) Davide Rigon	6	Ret	Ret	4	5	7	7		Ret	Ret					32
12	(Germany) Daniel la Rosa									2	2					31
13	(Italy) Paolo Maria Nocera								Ret	7	12	5	3	8	**Ret**	28
14	(Italy) Omar Galeffi	8	5	3												23
15	(Spain) Álvaro Barba													3	Ret	12
16	(Italy) Giovanni Berton	5														8
17	(San Marino) Paolo Meloni	10	7		10	DNS										6
18	(Italy) Francesco Dracone	11							9	8	Ret					5
19	(Italy) Gianpiero Negrotti						10	10								2
20	(Italy) Giovanni Rambelli						11	11								0
21	(Italy) Sergio Ghiotto									Ret	11					0
	(Italy) Davide Valsecchi											Ret	Ret			0
	(Italy) Imeiro Brigliadori						Ret	DNS								0
	(Italy) Franco Ghiotto	Ret														0
	(Italy) Alberto Morelli		Ret													0
Pos	Driver	ADR	MAG	PER	MUG		IMO		VAR	MNZ		VLL		MIS		Pts

Colour	Result
Gold	Winner
Silver	Second place
Bronze	Third place
Green	Points classification
Blue	Non-points classification
Blue	Non-classified finish (NC)
Purple	Retired, not classified (Ret)
Red	Did not qualify (DNQ)
Red	Did not pre-qualify (DNPQ)
Black	Disqualified (DSQ)
White	Did not start (DNS)
White	Withdrew (WD)
White	Race cancelled (C)
Blank	Did not practice (DNP)
Blank	Did not arrive (DNA)
Blank	Excluded (EX)

**Bold** – Pole
Italics – Fastest Lap
