= 2005 Italian Formula Three Championship =

Seasons
- ← 2004 2006 →

The 2005 Italian Formula Three Championship was the 41st Italian Formula Three Championship season. It began on 17 April at Adria and ended on 23 October at Misano after twelve races.

Luigi Ferrara of Corbetta Competizioni finished almost all races on podium position, including three wins at Imola, Monza and Misano to clinch the title. He finished nine points clear of Team Ghinzani driver Alexander Müller, who won race at Vallelunga, a race at Imola, both races at Mugello, race at Adria and the season-ending race at Misano. Third place went to Lucidi Motors driver Paolo Maria Nocera, who took three victories at Adria, Varano and Monza.

== Teams and drivers ==
All teams were Italian-registered and all cars competed on Michelin tyres.

Entry List
Team	No	Driver	Chassis	Engine	Rounds
Carlin / Ombra Racing	1	(Lebanon) Basil Shaaban	Dallara F302	Mugen-Honda	1
Carlin / Ombra Racing	1	(Italy) Giuseppe Termine	Dallara F302	Mugen-Honda	3–4
Carlin / Ombra Racing	2	(Lebanon) Khalil Beschir	Dallara F302	Mugen-Honda	1
Coloni Motorsport	3	(Italy) Giacomo Piccini	Lola-Dome F106	Spiess-Opel	1–2
Coloni Motorsport	4	(Italy) Riccardo Mari	Lola-Dome F106	Spiess-Opel	1
Lucidi Motors	5	(Italy) Paolo Maria Nocera	Dallara F302	Spiess-Opel	All
Lucidi Motors	6	(Italy) Giuseppe Termine	Dallara F302	Spiess-Opel	1–2
Corbetta Competizioni	7	(Italy) Luigi Ferrara	Dallara F304	Spiess-Opel	All
Corbetta Competizioni	8	(Italy) Francesco Dracone	Dallara F304	Spiess-Opel	3–4
Corbetta Competizioni	15	(Italy) Giovanni Faraonio	Dallara F304	Spiess-Opel	8–9
Corbetta Competizioni	15	(Italy) Fabrizio Crestani	Dallara F304	Spiess-Opel	11–12
Corbetta Competizioni	16	(Italy) Davide Valsecchi	Dallara F304	Spiess-Opel	5–7
Target Racing	9	(Italy) Riccardo Azzoli	Dallara F304	Spiess-Opel	All
Target Racing	11	(Greece) Elias Papailias	Dallara F304	Spiess-Opel	1, 3–12
Passoli Racing	12	(Italy) Maurizio Ceresoli	Dallara F304	Spiess-Opel	All
Passoli Racing	36	(Italy) Massimo Torre	Dallara F304	Spiess-Opel	1–6
Style Car Racing	14	(Italy) Imeiro Brigliadori	Dallara F302	Spiess-Opel	All
Style Car Racing	63	(Italy) Luca Di Cienzo	Dallara F399	Fiat	5–6
RP Motorsport	18	(Italy) Marcello Puglisi	Lola-Dome F106	Spiess-Opel	7
Team Ghinzani	22	(Germany) Alexander Müller	Dallara F302	Mugen-Honda	All
Team Ghinzani	23	(Italy) Marco Cencetti	Dallara F302	Mugen-Honda	7
Team Ghinzani	24	(Spain) Marco Barba	Dallara F302	Mugen-Honda	8–9
Imola Racing	61	(Italy) Nicola Ortolani	Dallara F399	Spiess-Opel	3–4
System Team	62	(Italy) Alberto Morelli	Dallara F302	Spiess-Opel	3–4

== Calendar ==
All rounds were held in Italy.

Round	Circuit	Date	Pole position	Fastest lap	Winning driver	Winning team
1	Adria International Raceway	17 April	(Italy) Luigi Ferrara	(Italy) Paolo Maria Nocera	(Italy) Paolo Maria Nocera	Lucidi Motors
2	ACI Vallelunga Circuit	8 May	(Italy) Paolo Maria Nocera	(Germany) Alexander Müller	(Germany) Alexander Müller	Team Ghinzani
3	Autodromo Enzo e Dino Ferrari	18 June	(Italy) Paolo Maria Nocera	(Germany) Alexander Müller	(Italy) Luigi Ferrara	Corbetta Competizioni
4	Autodromo Enzo e Dino Ferrari	19 June	(Germany) Alexander Müller	(Germany) Alexander Müller	(Germany) Alexander Müller	Team Ghinzani
5	Mugello Circuit	2 July	(Germany) Alexander Müller	(Italy) Riccardo Azzoli	(Germany) Alexander Müller	Team Ghinzani
6	Mugello Circuit	3 July	(Germany) Alexander Müller	(Germany) Alexander Müller	(Germany) Alexander Müller	Team Ghinzani
7	Autodromo Riccardo Paletti	11 September	(Italy) Paolo Maria Nocera	(Italy) Riccardo Azzoli	(Italy) Paolo Maria Nocera	Lucidi Motors
8	Autodromo Nazionale Monza	24 September	(Italy) Paolo Maria Nocera	(Italy) Paolo Maria Nocera	(Italy) Luigi Ferrara	Corbetta Competizioni
9	Autodromo Nazionale Monza	25 September	(Italy) Luigi Ferrara	(Italy) Paolo Maria Nocera	(Italy) Paolo Maria Nocera	Lucidi Motors
10	Adria International Raceway	9 October	(Italy) Luigi Ferrara	(Italy) Paolo Maria Nocera	(Germany) Alexander Müller	Team Ghinzani
11	Misano World Circuit	22 October	(Italy) Luigi Ferrara	(Italy) Riccardo Azzoli	(Italy) Luigi Ferrara	Corbetta Competizioni
12	Misano World Circuit	23 October	(Italy) Paolo Maria Nocera	(Germany) Alexander Müller	(Germany) Alexander Müller	Team Ghinzani

== Standings ==
- Points are awarded as follows:

1	2	3	4	5	6	7	8	9	10	PP	FL
20	15	12	10	8	6	4	3	2	1	**1**	1

Pos	Driver	ADR	VLL	IMO		MUG		VAR	MNZ		ADR	MIS		Pts
1	(Italy) Luigi Ferrara	**2**	3	1	3	2	3	2	1	**2**	**3**	**1**	5	180
2	(Germany) Alexander Müller	12	1	4	**1**	**1**	**1**	6	2	DSQ	1	3	1	171
3	(Italy) Paolo Maria Nocera	1	**2**	**2**	2	8	8	**1**	**5**	1	2	4	**2**	168
4	(Italy) Riccardo Azzoli	6	4	3	4	3	7	3	Ret	3	Ret	2	3	108
5	(Italy) Maurizio Ceresoli	3	Ret	8	6	7	5	7	3	6	4	5	6	79
6	(Greece) Elias Papailias	10		6	5	6	4	5	Ret	4	5	Ret	4	67
7	(Italy) Davide Valsecchi					4	2	4						35
8	(Italy) Massimo Torre	8	5	5	Ret	5	6							33
9	(Italy) Imeiro Brigliadori			7	7	9	9	9	6	7				24
10	(Spain) Marco Barba								4	5				18
11	(Italy) Giuseppe Termine	5	6	9	Ret									16
12	(Italy) Riccardo Mari	4												10
13	(Italy) Fabrizio Crestani											6	7	10
14	(Italy) Giacomo Piccini	7	Ret											4
15	(Italy) Giovanni Faraonio								Ret	8				3
16	(Italy) Marcello Puglisi							8						3
17	(Lebanon) Basil Shaaban	9												2
18	(Italy) Marco Cencetti							10						1
19	(Lebanon) Khalil Beschir	11												0
	(Italy) Francesco Dracone			Ret	Ret									0
guest drivers ineligible for championship points
	(Italy) Nicola Ortolani			10	8									0
	(Italy) Luca Di Cienzo					10	10							0
	(Italy) Alberto Morelli			Ret	DNS									0
Pos	Driver	ADR	VLL	IMO		MUG		VAR	MNZ		ADR	MIS		Pts

Colour	Result
Gold	Winner
Silver	Second place
Bronze	Third place
Green	Points classification
Blue	Non-points classification
Blue	Non-classified finish (NC)
Purple	Retired, not classified (Ret)
Red	Did not qualify (DNQ)
Red	Did not pre-qualify (DNPQ)
Black	Disqualified (DSQ)
White	Did not start (DNS)
White	Withdrew (WD)
White	Race cancelled (C)
Blank	Did not practice (DNP)
Blank	Did not arrive (DNA)
Blank	Excluded (EX)

**Bold** – Pole
Italics – Fastest Lap
