= 2007 Italian Formula Three Championship =

Italian Motorsport Competition

Seasons
- ← 2006 2008 →

The 2007 Italian Formula Three Championship was the 43rd Italian Formula Three Championship season. It began on 1 April at Adria and ended on 21 October at Monza after 16 races.

With victories at Adria, Misano, Vallelunga and Autodromo Nazionale Monza, Paolo Maria Nocera of Lucidi Motors finished the season as champion. He finished 21 points clear of Europa Corse driver Efisio Marchese, who won three races during the season. Third place went to Alan Racing driver Pablo Sánchez López, who also took three victories at Misano, Mugello, and Varano. Fourth place in the championship was claimed by Corbetta Competizioni's Mirko Bortolotti, who won the race at Mugello, while fifth went to his team-mate Fabrizio Crestani.

== Teams and drivers ==
All teams were Italian-registered and all cars competed on Michelin tyres.

Entry List
Team	No	Driver	Chassis	Engine	Rounds
Campionato Nazionale
Corbetta Competizioni	3	(Argentina) Augusto Scalbi	Dallara F304	Spiess-Opel	All
Corbetta Competizioni	4	(Italy) Fabrizio Crestani	Dallara F304	Spiess-Opel	All
Corbetta Competizioni	16	(Italy) Mirko Bortolotti	Dallara F304	Spiess-Opel	All
Lucidi Motors	5	(Italy) Nicola de Marco	Dallara F304	Spiess-Opel	All
Lucidi Motors	6	(Italy) Paolo Maria Nocera	Dallara F304	Spiess-Opel	All
Europa Corse	7	(Italy) Efisio Marchese	Dallara F304	Spiess-Opel	All
N.T.	9	(Italy) Jacopo Faccioni	Dallara F304	Spiess-Opel	All
Team Ghinzani	11	(Italy) Paolo Bossini	Dallara F304	Mugen-Honda	All
Team Ghinzani	12	(Italy) Giuseppe Termine	Dallara F304	Mugen-Honda	All
Alan Racing	14	(Mexico) Pablo Sánchez López	Dallara F304	Spiess-Opel	1–2, 4–8
Alan Racing	15	(Russia) Sergey Mokshantsev	Dallara F304	Spiess-Opel	8
Trofeo Nazionale CSAI
Europa Corse	51	(Italy) Matteo Cozzari	Dallara F302	Spiess-Opel	All
System Team	52	(Italy) Gianpiero Negrotti	Dallara F303	Spiess-Opel	1–4, 8
System Team	85	(Italy) Dino Lusuardi	Dallara F301	Fiat	1–6
System Team	89	(Italy) Massimo Ballestri	Dallara F394	Fiat	2
Facondini Racing	53	(Italy) Molin Pradel	Dallara F302	Spiess-Opel	2
Lido Corse	61	(Italy) Luciano Baldazzi	Dallara F301	Spiess-Opel	1–6, 8
Beelspeed	83	(Italy) Mauro Brozzi	Dallara F394	Fiat	1–6
Beelspeed	87	(Italy) Carlo Bendinelli	Dallara F301	Spiess-Opel	3–4, 6–7
Beelspeed	88	(Italy) Antonio Vizzaccaro	Dallara F394	Fiat	3
Beelspeed	91	(Italy) Luigi Folloni	Dallara F394	Fiat	1–2, 4–7
Team Cherubini	92	(Italy) Federico del Rosso	Dallara F398	Spiess-Opel	All
Team Cherubini	93	(Italy) Antonio di Venere	Dallara F398	Fiat	1
Team Cherubini	93	(Italy) Marco Cencetti	Dallara F398	Fiat	2–6
Team Cherubini	94	(Italy) Salvatore Cardullo	Dallara F398	Spiess-Opel	3–6, 8

== Calendar ==
All rounds were held in Italy.

Round		Circuit	Date	Pole position	Fastest lap	Winning driver	Winning team	Trofeo winner
1	R1	Adria International Raceway	1 April	(Italy) Paolo Maria Nocera	(Italy) Efisio Marchese	(Italy) Paolo Maria Nocera	Lucidi Motors	(Italy) Mauro Brozzi
1	R2	Adria International Raceway	1 April	(Italy) Paolo Maria Nocera	(Italy) Efisio Marchese	(Italy) Paolo Maria Nocera	Lucidi Motors	(Italy) Matteo Cozzari
2	R1	Misano World Circuit	7 June	(Italy) Fabrizio Crestani	(Italy) Fabrizio Crestani	(Italy) Paolo Maria Nocera	Lucidi Motors	(Italy) Marco Cencetti
2	R2	Misano World Circuit	8 June	(Italy) Fabrizio Crestani	(Mexico) Pablo Sánchez López	(Mexico) Pablo Sánchez López	Alan Racing	(Italy) Massimo Ballestri
3	R1	Autodromo dell'Umbria, Magione	7 July	(Italy) Efisio Marchese	(Italy) Efisio Marchese	(Italy) Efisio Marchese	Europa Corse	(Italy) Mauro Brozzi
3	R2	Autodromo dell'Umbria, Magione	7 July	(Italy) Efisio Marchese	(Italy) Efisio Marchese	(Italy) Efisio Marchese	Europa Corse	(Italy) Matteo Cozzari
4	R1	Mugello Circuit	20 July	(Mexico) Pablo Sánchez López	(Italy) Mirko Bortolotti	(Italy) Fabrizio Crestani	Corbetta Competizioni	(Italy) Matteo Cozzari
4	R2	Mugello Circuit	20 July	(Mexico) Pablo Sánchez López	(Mexico) Pablo Sánchez López	(Italy) Fabrizio Crestani	Corbetta Competizioni	(Italy) Matteo Cozzari
5	R1	Mugello Circuit	31 August	(Italy) Mirko Bortolotti	(Italy) Paolo Maria Nocera	(Italy) Mirko Bortolotti	Corbetta Competizioni	(Italy) Matteo Cozzari
5	R2	Mugello Circuit	1 September	(Italy) Mirko Bortolotti	(Italy) Nicola de Marco	(Mexico) Pablo Sánchez López	Alan Racing	(Italy) Matteo Cozzari
6	R1	Autodromo Riccardo Paletti, Varano	13 September	(Italy) Efisio Marchese	(Italy) Efisio Marchese	(Italy) Efisio Marchese	Europa Corse	(Italy) Marco Cencetti
6	R2	Autodromo Riccardo Paletti, Varano	14 September	(Mexico) Pablo Sánchez López	(Mexico) Pablo Sánchez López	(Mexico) Pablo Sánchez López	Alan Racing	no finishers
7	R1	ACI Vallelunga Circuit	27 September	(Italy) Paolo Maria Nocera	(Italy) Paolo Maria Nocera	(Italy) Paolo Maria Nocera	Lucidi Motors	(Italy) Federico del Rosso
7	R2	ACI Vallelunga Circuit	28 September	(Italy) Nicola de Marco	(Italy) Fabrizio Crestani	(Italy) Fabrizio Crestani	Corbetta Competizioni	(Italy) Luigi Folloni
8	R1	Autodromo Nazionale Monza	18 October	(Italy) Paolo Maria Nocera	(Italy) Fabrizio Crestani	(Italy) Paolo Maria Nocera	Lucidi Motors	(Italy) Matteo Cozzari
8	R2	Autodromo Nazionale Monza	19 October	(Italy) Paolo Maria Nocera	(Italy) Paolo Maria Nocera	(Italy) Paolo Maria Nocera	Lucidi Motors	no finishers

== Standings ==
- Points are awarded as follows:

1	2	3	4	5	6	7	8	PP	FL
10	8	6	5	4	3	2	1	**1**	1

Pos	Driver	ADR		MIS		MAG		MUG		MUG		VAR		VLL		MNZ		Pts
Campionato Nazionale
1	(Italy) Paolo Maria Nocera	**1**	**1**	1	12	5	4	DSQ	4	Ret	2	2	2	**1**	2	**1**	**1**	114
2	(Italy) Efisio Marchese	2	2	6	5	**1**	**1**	5	8	4	4	**1**	3	7	6	Ret	3	93
3	(Mexico) Pablo Sánchez López	DSQ	4	2	1			**3**	**6**	2	1	3	**1**	Ret	3	3	Ret	84
4	(Italy) Mirko Bortolotti	3	5	5	4	2	2	2	2	**1**	**8**	10	10	3	5	12	5	81
5	(Italy) Fabrizio Crestani	Ret	3	**3**	**2**	4	8	1	1	Ret	Ret	17	5	Ret	1	2	Ret	73
6	(Italy) Nicola de Marco	5	7	8	3	3	3	4	3	3	3	4	4	4	Ret	8	Ret	67
7	(Italy) Giuseppe Termine	4	6	4	6	Ret	6	Ret	5	6	Ret	5	6	2	7	5	4	52
8	(Argentina) Augusto Scalbi	7	8	9	8	7	5	8	9	5	5	7	7	Ret	4	4	2	42
9	(Italy) Paolo Bossini	6	10	7	7	6	7	6	7	7	6	6	8	6	9	6	6	35
10	(Italy) Jacopo Faccioni	8	9	Ret	9	9	9	9	11	10	9	8	9	5	8	13	Ret	11
	(Russia) Sergey Mokshantsev															Ret	Ret	0
Trofeo Nazionale CSAI
1	(Italy) Matteo Cozzari	10	11	DNS	DNS	10	10	7	10	8	7	11	DNS	Ret	Ret	7	DNS	47
2	(Italy) Luciano Baldazzi	11	DNS	12	DNS	11	DNS	10	Ret	12	DNS	13	Ret			9	Ret	21
3	(Italy) Mauro Brozzi	9	DNS	DNS	DNS	8	Ret	Ret	12	11	DNS							17
4	(Italy) Federico del Rosso	13	DNS	11	DNS	12	DNS	12	DNS	14	DNS	12	DNS	8	DNS	DNS	DNS	17
5	(Italy) Marco Cencetti			10	DNS	Ret	DNS	Ret	DNS	9	DNS	9	DNS					14
6	(Italy) Luigi Folloni	15	DNS	16	DNS			13	14	DNS	DNS	DNS	DNS	9	10			12
7	(Italy) Gianpiero Negrotti	Ret	12	15	11	14	13	15	DNS							11	DNS	12
8	(Italy) Dino Lusuardi	12	DNS	13	DNS	15	11	11	DNS	13	DNS	15	DNS					12
9	(Italy) Carlo Bendinelli					17	12	14	13			14	Ret	DNS	DNS			7
10	(Italy) Massimo Ballestri			14	10													6
11	(Italy) Salvatore Cardullo					13	DNS	DNS	DNS	15	DNS	16	DNS			10	DNS	4
12	(Italy) Antonio di Venere	14	DNS															0
13	(Italy) Antonio Vizzaccaro					16	Ret											0
14	(Italy) Molin Pradel			17	DSQ													0
Pos	Driver	ADR		MIS		MAG		MUG		MUG		VAR		VLL		MNZ		Pts

Colour	Result
Gold	Winner
Silver	Second place
Bronze	Third place
Green	Points classification
Blue	Non-points classification
Blue	Non-classified finish (NC)
Purple	Retired, not classified (Ret)
Red	Did not qualify (DNQ)
Red	Did not pre-qualify (DNPQ)
Black	Disqualified (DSQ)
White	Did not start (DNS)
White	Withdrew (WD)
White	Race cancelled (C)
Blank	Did not practice (DNP)
Blank	Did not arrive (DNA)
Blank	Excluded (EX)

**Bold** – Pole
Italics – Fastest Lap
