= 2022 Portimão DTM round =

Motor racing competition

(Portugal) 2022 DTM Portimão round
Round details
- Round 1 of 8 rounds in the 2022 Deutsche Tourenwagen Masters season
- Location: Portimão, Portugal
- Course: Permanent racing facility 4.653 km (2.891 mi)

Deutsche Tourenwagen Masters

Race 1
- Date: 30 April 2022
- Laps: 32

Pole position
Driver	(Italy) Mirko Bortolotti	GRT
- Time: 1:39.678

Podium
First	(Austria) Lucas Auer	Mercedes-AMG Team Winward
Second	(Germany) Luca Stolz	Mercedes-AMG Team HRT
Third	(Italy) Mirko Bortolotti	GRT

Fastest lap
Driver	(Germany) Luca Stolz	Mercedes-AMG Team HRT
- Time: 1:41.154 (on lap 10)

Race 2
- Date: 1 May 2022
- Laps: 33

Pole position
Driver	(Switzerland) Nico Müller	Team Rosberg

Podium
Second	(Brazil) Felipe Fraga	Red Bull AF Corse
Third	(Italy) Mirko Bortolotti	GRT

Fastest lap
Driver	(Brazil) Felipe Fraga	Red Bull AF Corse
- Time: 1:41.681 (on lap 8)

The 2022 Portimão DTM round was a motor racing event for the Deutsche Tourenwagen Masters held between 30 April and 1 May 2022. The event, part of the 36th season of the DTM, was held at the Algarve International Circuit in Portugal.

== Results ==
=== Race 1 ===
==== Qualifying ====
Pos.	No.	Driver	Team	Car	Time	Gap	Grid	Pts
1	63	(Italy) Mirko Bortolotti	GRT	Lamborghini Huracán GT3 Evo	1:39.678		1	3
2	55	(Canada) Mikaël Grenier	Mercedes-AMG Team GruppeM Racing	Mercedes-AMG GT3 Evo	1:39.689	+0.011	2	2
3	22	(Australia) Lucas Auer	Mercedes-AMG Team Winward	Mercedes-AMG GT3 Evo	1:39.719	+0.041	3	1
4	74	(Brazil) Felipe Fraga	Red Bull AF Corse	Ferrari 488 GT3 Evo 2020	1:39.738	+0.060	4	
5	95	(Denmark) Nicki Thiim	T3 Motorsport	Lamborghini Huracán GT3 Evo	1:39.929	+0.251	5	
6	88	(Germany) Maro Engel	Mercedes-AMG Team GruppeM Racing	Mercedes-AMG GT3 Evo	1:39.933	+0.255	6	
7	31	(South Africa) Sheldon van der Linde	Schubert Motorsport	BMW M4 GT3	1:39.955	+0.277	7	
8	4	(Germany) Luca Stolz	Mercedes-AMG Team HRT	Mercedes-AMG GT3 Evo	1:39.988	+0.310	8	
9	1	(Germany) Maximilian Götz	Mercedes-AMG Team Winward	Mercedes-AMG GT3 Evo	1:40.090	+0.412	9	
10	51	(Switzerland) Nico Müller	Team Rosberg	Audi R8 LMS Evo II	1:40.098	+0.420	10	
11	33	(Germany) René Rast	Team Abt	Audi R8 LMS Evo II	1:40.172	+0.494	11	
12	18	(Germany) Maximilian Buhk	Mercedes-AMG Team Mücke Motorsport	Mercedes-AMG GT3 Evo	1:40.234	+0.556	12	
13	7	(Switzerland) Ricardo Feller	Team Abt Sportsline	Audi R8 LMS Evo II	1:40.277	+0.599	13	
14	85	(Austria) Clemens Schmid	GRT Grasser Racing.com	Lamborghini Huracán GT3 Evo	1:40.281	+0.603	14	
15	36	(India) Arjun Maini	Mercedes-AMG Team HRT	Mercedes-AMG GT3 Evo	1:40.284	0.606	15	
16	11	(Germany) Marco Wittmann	Walkenhorst Motorsport	BMW M4 GT3	1:40.312	+0.634	16	
17	3	(South Africa) Kelvin van der Linde	Team Abt Sportsline	Audi R8 LMS Evo II	1:40.337	+0.659	17	
18	27	(Germany) David Schumacher	Mercedes-AMG Team Winward	Mercedes-AMG GT3 Evo	1:40.360	+0.682	18	
19	94	(Norway) Dennis Olsen	SSR Performance	Porsche 911 GT3 R	1:40.388	+0.710	19	
20	24	(Austria) Thomas Preining	KÜS Team Bernhard	Porsche 911 GT3 R	1:40.392	+0.714	20	
21	37	(France) Sébastien Loeb	AlphaTauri AF Corse	Ferrari 488 GT3 Evo 2020	1:40.464	+0.786	21	
22	66	(Germany) Marius Zug	Attempto Racing	Audi R8 LMS Evo II	1:40.521	+0.843	22	
23	12	(United States) Dev Gore	Team Rosberg	Audi R8 LMS Evo II	1:40.536	+0.858	23	
24	25	(Austria) Philipp Eng	Schubert Motorsport	BMW M4 GT3	1:40.623	+0.945	24	
25	19	(Switzerland) Rolf Ineichen	GRT	Lamborghini Huracán GT3 Evo	1:40.697	+1.019	25	
26	92	(Belgium) Laurens Vanthoor	SSR Performance	Porsche 911 GT3 R	1:40.770	+1.092	26	
27	26	(United Kingdom) Esmee Hawkey	T3 Motorsport	Lamborghini Huracán GT3 Evo	1:40.895	+1.217	27	
28	10	(Germany) Esteban Muth	Walkenhorst Motorsport	BMW M4 GT3	1:41.030	+1.352	28	
29	6	(Italy) Alessio Deledda	GRT Grasser Racing.com	Lamborghini Huracán GT3 Evo	1:41.880	+2.202	29	

==== Race ====
Pos	No.	Driver	Team	Car	Laps	Time / Retired	Grid	Pts
1	22	(Austria) Lucas Auer	Mercedes-AMG Team Winward	Mercedes-AMG GT3 Evo	32	57:55:325	3	25
2	4	(Germany) Luca Stolz	Mercedes-AMG Team HRT	Mercedes-AMG GT3 Evo	32	+0.851	8	18
3	63	(Italy) Mirko Bortolotti	GRT	Lamborghini Huracán GT3 Evo	32	+1.811	1	15
4	3	(South Africa) Kelvin van der Linde	Team Abt Sportsline	Audi R8 LMS Evo II	32	+3.053	7	12
5	94	(Norway) Dennis Olsen	SSR Performance	Porsche 911 GT3 R	32	+3.406	19	10
6	7	(Switzerland) Ricardo Feller	Team Abt Sportsline	Audi R8 LMS Evo II	32	+4.405	13	8
7	31	(South Africa) Sheldon van der Linde	Schubert Motorsport	BMW M4 GT3	32	+4.768	7	6
8	92	(Belgium) Laurens Vanthoor	SSR Performance	Porsche 911 GT3 R	32	+5.365	26	4
9	25	(Austria) Philipp Eng	Schubert Motorsport	BMW M4 GT3	32	+7.399	24	2
10	88	(Germany) Maro Engel	Mercedes-AMG Team GruppeM Racing	Mercedes-AMG GT3 Evo	32	+7.468	6	1
11	1	(Germany) Maximilian Götz	Mercedes-AMG Team Winward	Mercedes-AMG GT3 Evo	32	+8.534	9	
12	95	(Denmark) Nicki Thiim	T3 Motorsport	Lamborghini Huracán GT3 Evo	32	+9.141	5	
13	24	(Austria) Thomas Preining	KÜS Team Bernhard	Porsche 911 GT3 R	32	+12.480	20	
14	10	(Germany) Esteban Muth	Walkenhorst Motorsport	BMW M4 GT3	32	+13.303	28	
15	55	(Canada) Mikaël Grenier	Mercedes-AMG Team GruppeM Racing	Mercedes-AMG GT3 Evo	32	+13.752	2	
16	37	(France) Sebastien Loeb	AlphaTauri AF Corse	Ferrari 488 GT3 Evo 2020	32	+14.285	21	
17	36	(India) Arjun Maini	Mercedes-AMG Team HRT	Mercedes-AMG GT3 Evo	32	+14.975	15	
18	66	(Germany) Marius Zug	Attempto Racing	Audi R8 LMS Evo II	32	+16.060	22	
19	18	(Germany) Maximilian Buhk	Mercedes-AMG Team Mücke Motorsport	Mercedes-AMG GT3 Evo	32	+16.701	12	
20	27	(Germany) David Schumacher	Mercedes-AMG Team Winward	Mercedes-AMG GT3 Evo	32	+17.264	18	
21	85	(Austria) Clemens Schmid	GRT Grasser Racing.com	Lamborghini Huracán GT3 Evo	32	+18.031	14	
22	6	(Italy) Alessio Deledda	GRT Grasser Racing.com	Lamborghini Huracán GT3 Evo	32	+25.942	29	
Ret	26	(United Kingdom) Esmee Hawkey	T3 Motorsport	Lamborghini Huracán GT3 Evo	23	retired	27	
Ret	33	(Germany) René Rast	Team Abt	Audi R8 LMS Evo II	22	retired	11	
Ret	74	(Brazil) Felipe Fraga	Red Bull AF Corse	Ferrari 488 GT3 Evo 2020	21	retired	4	
Ret	19	(Switzerland) Rolf Ineichen	GRT	Lamborghini Huracán GT3 Evo	16	retired	25	
NC	11	(Germany) Marco Wittmann	Walkenhorst Motorsport	BMW M4 GT3	10	retired	16	
Ret	12	(United States) Dev Gore	Team Rosberg	Audi R8 LMS Evo II	7	retired	23	
Ret	51	(Switzerland) Nico Muller	Team Rosberg	Audi R8 LMS Evo II	3	retired	10	
Fastest lap set by Luca Stolz: 1:41.154

=== Race 2 ===
==== Qualifying ====
Pos.	No.	Driver	Team	Car	Time	Gap	Grid	Pts
1	51	(Switzerland) Nico Muller	Team Rosberg	Audi R8 LMS Evo II	1:39.794		1	3
2	63	(Italy) Mirko Bortolotti	GRT	Lamborghini Huracán GT3 Evo	1:40.001	+0.207	2	2
3	74	(Brazil) Felipe Fraga	Red Bull AF Corse	Ferrari 488 GT3 Evo 2020	1:40.011	+0.217	3	1
4	31	(South Africa) Sheldon van der Linde	Schubert Motorsport	BMW M4 GT3	1:40.012	+0.218	4	
5	22	(Austria) Lucas Auer	Mercedes-AMG Team Winward	Mercedes-AMG GT3 Evo	1:40.055	+0.261	5	
6	4	(Germany) Luca Stolz	Mercedes-AMG Team HRT	Mercedes-AMG GT3 Evo	1:40.063	+0.269	6	
7	11	(Germany) Marco Wittmann	Walkenhorst Motorsport	BMW M4 GT3	1:40.107	+0.313	7	
8	3	(South Africa) Kelvin van der Linde	Team Abt Sportsline	Audi R8 LMS Evo II	1:40.153	+0.359	8	
9	7	(Switzerland) Ricardo Feller	Team Abt Sportsline	Audi R8 LMS Evo II	1:40.154	+0.360	9	
10	1	(Germany) Maximilian Götz	Mercedes-AMG Team Winward	Mercedes-AMG GT3 Evo	1:40.189	+0.395	10	
11	92	(Belgium) Laurens Vanthoor	SSR Performance	Porsche 911 GT3 R	1:40.210	+0.416	11	
12	12	(United States) Dev Gore	Team Rosberg	Audi R8 LMS Evo II	1:40.236	+0.442	12	
13	33	(Germany) René Rast	Team Abt	Audi R8 LMS Evo II	1:40.283	+0.489	13	
14	66	(Germany) Marius Zug	Team Rosberg	Audi R8 LMS Evo II	1:40.285	+0.491	14	
15	55	(Canada) Mikaël Grenier	Mercedes-AMG Team GruppeM Racing	Mercedes-AMG GT3 Evo	1:40.304	+0.510	15	
16	94	(Norway) Dennis Olsen	SSR Performance	Porsche 911 GT3 R	1:40.378	+0.584	16	
17	10	(Germany) Esteban Muth	Walkenhorst Motorsport	BMW M4 GT3	1:40.410	+0.616	17	
18	88	(Germany) Maro Engel	Mercedes-AMG Team GruppeM Racing	Mercedes-AMG GT3 Evo	1:40.471	+0.677	18	
19	25	(Austria) Philipp Eng	Schubert Motorsport	BMW M4 GT3	1:40.537	+0.743	19	
20	95	(Denmark) Nicki Thiim	T3 Motorsport	Lamborghini Huracán GT3 Evo	1:40.563	+0.769	20	
21	24	(Austria) Thomas Preining	KÜS Team Bernhard	Porsche 911 GT3 R	1:40.580	+0.786	21	
22	36	(India) Arjun Maini	Mercedes-AMG Team HRT	Mercedes-AMG GT3 Evo	1:40.597	+0.803	22	
23	18	(Germany) Maximilian Buhk	Mercedes-AMG Team Mücke Motorsport	Mercedes-AMG GT3 Evo	1:40.622	+0.828	23	
24	27	(Germany) David Schumacher	Mercedes-AMG Team Winward	Mercedes-AMG GT3 Evo	1:40.670	+0.876	24	
25	85	(Austria) Clemens Schmid	GRT Grasser Racing.com	Lamborghini Huracán GT3 Evo	1:40.947	+1.153	25	
26	19	(Switzerland) Rolf Ineichen	GRT	Lamborghini Huracán GT3 Evo	1:40.959	+1.165	26	
27	37	(France) Sébastien Loeb	AlphaTauri AF Corse	Ferrari 488 GT3 Evo 2020	1:41.045	+1.251	27	
28	26	(United Kingdom) Esmee Hawkey	T3 Motorsport	Lamborghini Huracán GT3 Evo	1:41.613	+1.819	28	
29	6	(Italy) Alessio Deledda	GRT Grasser Racing.com	Lamborghini Huracán GT3 Evo	1:42.208	+2.414	29	

==== Race ====
Pos	No.	Driver	Team	Car	Laps	Time / Retired	Grid	Pts
1	51	(Switzerland) Nico Müller	Team Rosberg	Audi R8 LMS Evo II	33	56:69.568	1	25
2	74	(Brazil) Felipe Fraga	Red Bull AF Corse	Ferrari 488 GT3 Evo 2020	33	+3.415	3	18
3	63	(Italy) Mirko Bortolotti	GRT	Lamborghini Huracán GT3 Evo	33	+8.447	2	15
4	11	(Germany) Marco Wittmann	Walkenhorst Motorsport	BMW M4 GT3	33	+10.283	7	12
5	1	(Germany) Maximilian Gotz	Mercedes-AMG Team Winward|	Mercedes-AMG GT3 Evo	33	+12.734	10	10
6	3	(South Africa) Kelvin van der Linde	Team Abt Sportsline	Audi R8 LMS Evo II	33	+13.553	8	8
7	92	(Belgium) Laurens Vanthoor	SSR Performance	Porsche 911 GT3 R	33	+14.349	11	6
8	31	(South Africa) Sheldon van der Linde	Schubert Motorsport	BMW M4 GT3	33	+18.002	4	4
9	7	(Switzerland) Ricardo Feller	Team Abt Sportsline	Audi R8 LMS Evo II	33	+19.754	9	2
10	88	(Germany) Maro Engel	Mercedes-AMG Team GruppeM Racing	Mercedes-AMG GT3 Evo	33	+21.579	18	1
11	94	(Norway) Dennis Olsen	SSR Performance	Porsche 911 GT3 R	33	+22.410	16	
12	33	(Germany) René Rast	Team Abt	Audi R8 LMS Evo II	33	+22.966	13	
13	36	(India) Arjun Maini	Mercedes-AMG Team HRT	Mercedes-AMG GT3 Evo	33	+23.621	22	
14	10	(Germany) Esteban Muth	Walkenhorst Motorsport	BMW M4 GT3	33	+27.854	17	
15	27	(Germany) David Schumacher	Mercedes-AMG Team Winward	Mercedes-AMG GT3 Evo	33	+28.165	24	
16	66	(Germany) Marius Zug	Attempto Racing	Audi R8 LMS Evo II	33	+34.885	14	
17	18	(Germany) Maximilian Buhk	Mercedes-AMG Team Mücke Motorsport	Mercedes-AMG GT3 Evo	33	+36.943	23	
18	37	(France) Sebastien Loeb	AlphaTauri AF Corse	Ferrari 488 GT3 Evo 2020	33	+47.817	27	
19	85	(Austria) Clemens Schmid	GRT Grasser Racing.com	Lamborghini Huracán GT3 Evo	33	+50.025	25	
20	12	(United States) Dev Gore	Team Rosberg	Audi R8 LMS Evo II	33	+1:00.836	12	
21	26	(United Kingdom) Esmee Hawkey	T3 Motorsport	Lamborghini Huracán GT3 Evo	33	+1:08.140	28	
22	22	(Austria) Lucas Auer	Mercedes-AMG Team Winward	Mercedes-AMG GT3 Evo	33	+1:11.368	5	
22	23	(Italy) Alessio Deledda	GRT Grasser Racing.com	Lamborghini Huracán GT3 Evo	33	+1:28.589	29	
Ret	55	(Canada) Mikaël Grenier	Mercedes-AMG Team GruppeM Racing	Mercedes-AMG GT3 Evo	23	retired	15	
Ret	4	(Germany) Luca Stolz	Mercedes-AMG Team HRT	Mercedes-AMG GT3 Evo	2	retired	6	
Ret	95	(Denmark) Nicki Thiim	T3 Motorsport	Lamborghini Huracán GT3 Evo	1	retired	20	
Ret	24	(Austria) Thomas Preining	KÜS Team Bernhard	Porsche 911 GT3 R	1	retired	21	
Ret	25	(Austria) Philipp Eng	Schubert Motorsport	BMW M4 GT3	0	retired	19	
Ret	19	(Switzerland) Rolf Ineichen	GRT	Lamborghini Huracán GT3 Evo	0	retired	26	
Fastest lap set by Felipe Fraga: 1:41.681

== Championship standings ==
Drivers Championship

Pos	Driver	Pts	Gap
1	(Italy) Mirko Bortolotti	35	
2	(Switzerland) Nico Müller	28	-7
3	(Austria) Lucas Auer	26	-9
4	(Brazil) Felipe Fraga	20	-15
5	(South Africa) Kelvin van der Linde	20	-15

Teams Championship

Pos	Team	Pts	Gap
1	(Austria) Grasser Racing Team (19, 63)	35	
2	(Germany) Team Abt Sportsline (3, 7)	30	-5
3	(Germany) Team Rosberg (12, 51)	28	-7
4	(United States) Mercedes-AMG Team Winward (22, 27)	26	-9
5	(Germany) SSR Performance (92, 94)	20	-15

Manufacturers Championship

Pos	Drivers	Pts	Gap
1	(Germany) Mercedes-AMG	58	
2	(Germany) Audi	58	
3	(Austria) Lamborghini	35	-23
4	(Germany) BMW	24	-34
5	(Germany) Porsche	20	-38

- Note: Only the top five positions are included for three sets of standings.

Previous race: 2021 Norisring DTM round	Deutsche Tourenwagen Masters; 2022 season	Next race: 2022 Lausitzring DTM round
