= 2013 Eurocup Mégane Trophy =

Seasons
- ← 2012 2015 (Renault Sport Trophy) →

The 2013 Eurocup Mégane Trophy season was the ninth and final season of the Renault–supported touring car category, a one-make racing series that is part of the World Series by Renault.

== Driver lineup ==
| Team | No. | Driver | Status | Rounds |
|---|---|---|---|---|
| (Italy) Oregon Team | 1 | (France) Marguerite Laffite | | All |
| (Italy) Oregon Team | 1 | (Italy) Michela Cerruti | | 3 |
| (Italy) Oregon Team | 2 | (Italy) Enrico Bettera | G | 2, 4, 6–7 |
| (Italy) Oregon Team | 2 | (Russia) Roman Golikov | G | 3 |
| (Italy) Oregon Team | 2 | (Romania) Mihai Marinescu | J | 5 |
| (Italy) Oregon Team | 3 | (Italy) Kevin Gilardoni | J | All |
| (Italy) Oregon Team | 4 | (Italy) Mirko Bortolotti | J | All |
| (Italy) Oregon Team | 5 | (Russia) Vladimir Lunkin | J | All |
| (Italy) Oregon Team | 6 | (Netherlands) Kelvin Snoeks | | All |
| (France) Team Lompech Sport | 9 | (France) Jean-Charles Miginiac | G | All |
| (France) Team Lompech Sport | 18 | (France) Steven Palette | J | All |
| (Czech Republic) Gravity Charouz | 11 | (Spain) Toni Forné | G | All |
| (Czech Republic) Gravity Charouz | 14 | (Czech Republic) Erik Janiš | | 1, 3–7 |
| (Czech Republic) Gravity Charouz | 14 | (Czech Republic) Erik Janiš | J | 2 |
| (Czech Republic) Gravity Charouz | 15 | (Czech Republic) Jakub Knoll | J | All |
| (Netherlands) McGregor by Equipe Verschuur | 19 | (Netherlands) Jeroen Schothorst | G | All |
| (Netherlands) McGregor by Equipe Verschuur | 21 | (Netherlands) Mike Verschuur | | All |
| (Netherlands) Las Moras by Equipe Verschuur | 20 | (Netherlands) Max Braams | J | All |
| (Netherlands) Las Moras by Equipe Verschuur | 22 | (Netherlands) Pieter Schothorst | J | 3 |
| (Netherlands) Las Moras by Equipe Verschuur | 22 | (Netherlands) Luc Braams | G | 7 |
| (Germany) AFK Motorsport | 23 | (Germany) Oliver Freymuth | G | 1–2, 4–7 |
| (Germany) AFK Motorsport | 26 | (France) Denis Gibaud | G | 6 |
| (Portugal) Algarve Pro Racing Team | 24 | (Sweden) Richard Kressner | G | 2, 6–7 |
| (Netherlands) Equipe Verschuur | 25 | (Netherlands) Jelle Beelen | J | 5–7 |

| Icon | Class |
|---|---|
| J | Junior Driver |
| G | Gentleman Driver |

== Race calendar and results ==
The calendar for the 2013 season was announced on 20 October 2012, the day before the end of the 2012 season. All seven rounds will form meetings of the 2013 World Series by Renault season.

| Round | | Circuit | Country | Date | Pole position | Fastest lap | Winning driver | Winning team |
|---|---|---|---|---|---|---|---|---|
| 1 | R1 | Ciudad del Motor de Aragón, Alcañiz | Spain | 27 April | (Italy) Mirko Bortolotti | (Czech Republic) Erik Janiš | (Italy) Mirko Bortolotti | (Italy) Oregon Team |
| 1 | R2 | Ciudad del Motor de Aragón, Alcañiz | Spain | 28 April | (Italy) Mirko Bortolotti | (Italy) Kevin Gilardoni | (Italy) Mirko Bortolotti | (Italy) Oregon Team |
| 2 | R1 | Circuit de Spa-Francorchamps | Belgium | 1 June | (Italy) Mirko Bortolotti | (France) Steven Palette | (Netherlands) Mike Verschuur | (Netherlands) McGregor by Equipe Verschuur |
| 2 | R2 | Circuit de Spa-Francorchamps | Belgium | 2 June | (Italy) Kevin Gilardoni | (Italy) Mirko Bortolotti | (Italy) Mirko Bortolotti | (Italy) Oregon Team |
| 3 | R1 | Moscow Raceway | Russia | 22 June | (Italy) Mirko Bortolotti | (Netherlands) Mike Verschuur | (Italy) Mirko Bortolotti | (Italy) Oregon Team |
| 3 | R2 | Moscow Raceway | Russia | 23 June | (Italy) Mirko Bortolotti | (Italy) Mirko Bortolotti | (Netherlands) Mike Verschuur | (Netherlands) McGregor by Equipe Verschuur |
| 4 | R1 | Red Bull Ring | Austria | 20 July | (Italy) Mirko Bortolotti | (Italy) Mirko Bortolotti | (Italy) Mirko Bortolotti | (Italy) Oregon Team |
| 4 | R2 | Red Bull Ring | Austria | 21 July | (Italy) Mirko Bortolotti | (Italy) Mirko Bortolotti | (Italy) Mirko Bortolotti | (Italy) Oregon Team |
| 5 | R1 | Hungaroring, Mogyoród | Hungary | 14 September | (Italy) Mirko Bortolotti | (Netherlands) Kelvin Snoeks | (Italy) Mirko Bortolotti | (Italy) Oregon Team |
| 5 | R2 | Hungaroring, Mogyoród | Hungary | 15 September | (Italy) Mirko Bortolotti | (Netherlands) Mike Verschuur | (Netherlands) Mike Verschuur | (Netherlands) McGregor by Equipe Verschuur |
| 6 | R1 | Circuit Paul Ricard, Le Castellet | France | 28 September | (Italy) Mirko Bortolotti | (Netherlands) Mike Verschuur | (Netherlands) Mike Verschuur | (Netherlands) McGregor by Equipe Verschuur |
| 6 | R2 | Circuit Paul Ricard, Le Castellet | France | 29 September | Race cancelled (Note: The second race at Le Castellet was cancelled due to rain. The race was rescheduled to the final meeting at Circuit de Barcelona-Catalunya.) | | | |
| 7 | R1 | Circuit de Barcelona-Catalunya, Montmeló | Spain | 19 October | (Italy) Mirko Bortolotti | (Italy) Mirko Bortolotti | (Italy) Mirko Bortolotti | (Italy) Oregon Team |
| 7 | R2 | Circuit de Barcelona-Catalunya, Montmeló | Spain | 20 October | (Italy) Mirko Bortolotti | (Netherlands) Mike Verschuur | (Switzerland) Stefano Comini | (France) Team Lompech Sport |
| 7 | R3 | Circuit de Barcelona-Catalunya, Montmeló | Spain | 20 October | (Italy) Mirko Bortolotti | (Italy) Mirko Bortolotti | (Netherlands) Mike Verschuur | (Netherlands) McGregor by Equipe Verschuur |

== Championship standings ==
- Points for both championships were awarded as follows:

| 1st | 2nd | 3rd | 4th | 5th | 6th | 7th | 8th | 9th | 10th |
|---|---|---|---|---|---|---|---|---|---|
| 25 | 18 | 15 | 12 | 10 | 8 | 6 | 4 | 2 | 1 |

=== Drivers' Championship ===
| Pos | Driver | ALC (Spain) | | SPA (Belgium) | | MSC (Russia) | | RBR (Austria) | | HUN (Hungary) | | LEC (France) | | CAT (Spain) | | | Points |
|---|---|---|---|---|---|---|---|---|---|---|---|---|---|---|---|---|---|
| 1 | (Italy) Mirko Bortolotti | **1** | **1** | **4** | 1 | **1** | **2** | **1** | **1** | **1** | **4** | **2** | C | **1** | **DSQ** | **3** | 275 |
| 2 | (Netherlands) Mike Verschuur | Ret | 5 | 1 | 2 | 7 | 1 | 3 | 2 | 10 | 1 | 1 | C | 2 | 2 | 1 | 237 |
| 3 | (Italy) Kevin Gilardoni | 2 | 2 | 14† | **7** | 4 | Ret | 5 | 4 | 3 | 3 | 3 | C | 4 | 4 | 2 | 169 |
| 4 | (Netherlands) Kelvin Snoeks | Ret | 3 | 2 | 6 | 3 | 3 | Ret | Ret | 2 | 2 | 5 | C | 5 | Ret | 13† | 129 |
| 5 | (Czech Republic) Erik Janiš | 3 | 6 | 3 | DSQ | 5 | 4 | 4 | 3 | 5 | Ret | 4 | C | Ret | Ret | 4 | 121 |
| 6 | (Netherlands) Max Braams | 4 | 4 | 6 | 3 | Ret | Ret | Ret | 5 | 6 | 7 | 6 | C | 6 | 3 | 5 | 119 |
| 7 | (Netherlands) Jeroen Schothorst | 5 | 11 | 7 | 5 | 10 | 6 | 8 | Ret | 9 | 8 | 9 | C | 7 | 7 | 11 | 72 |
| 8 | (France) Steven Palette | Ret | Ret | 5 | Ret | 6 | 5 | 2 | 11 | 4 | 6 | 16 | C | | | | 68 |
| 9 | (Russia) Vladimir Lunkin | 11 | 7 | Ret | 4 | 9 | Ret | 6 | Ret | 7 | 11 | 15 | C | 9 | Ret | 7 | 48 |
| 10 | (Spain) Toni Forné | 8 | 8 | 13 | 12 | Ret | 9 | 7 | 12 | 11 | 13 | 8 | C | 8 | 5 | Ret | 41 |
| 11 | (France) Jean-Charles Miginiac | 6 | 13 | 11 | 9 | Ret | 7 | 12 | 8 | 15 | Ret | 12 | C | 11 | 8 | 8 | 35 |
| 12 | (France) Marguerite Laffite | 7 | 10 | Ret | 8 | 8 | | 9 | 6 | 12 | 9 | 10 | C | | Ret | 10 | 33 |
| 13 | (Netherlands) Pieter Schothorst | | | | | 2 | Ret | | | | | | | | | | 18 |
| 14 | (Italy) Enrico Bettera | | | 8 | 10 | | | 10 | 7 | | | 14 | C | 14 | 9 | 12 | 18 |
| 15 | (Germany) Oliver Freymuth | 9 | 9 | 9 | Ret | | | Ret | 10 | 16 | 14 | 13 | C | 10 | 11 | 9 | 17 |
| 16 | (Czech Republic) Jakub Knoll | 10 | 12 | 10 | 11 | 11 | 11 | 11 | 9 | 13 | 12 | 11 | C | DNS | DNS | DNS | 6 |
| 17 | (Italy) Michela Cerruti | | | | | | 8 | | | | | | | | | | 4 |
| 18 | (Russia) Roman Golikov | | | | | Ret | 10 | | | | | | | | | | 1 |
| | (Sweden) Richard Kressner | | | 12 | 13 | | | | | | | Ret | C | 12 | Ret | Ret | 0 |
Guest drivers ineligible for points
| | (Switzerland) Stefano Comini | | | | | | | | | | | | | 3 | 1 | | 0 |
| | (Romania) Mihai Marinescu | | | | | | | | | 8 | 5 | | | | | | 0 |
| | (Netherlands) Jelle Beelen | | | | | | | | | 14 | 10 | 7 | C | 13 | 6 | 6 | 0 |
| | (Netherlands) Luc Braams | | | | | | | | | | | | | Ret | 10 | | 0 |
| | (France) Jacques Laffite | | | | | | | | | | | | | 15 | | | 0 |
| | (France) Denis Gibaud | | | | | | | | | | | DNS | C | | | | 0 |
| Pos | Driver | ALC (Spain) | | SPA (Belgium) | | MSC (Russia) | | RBR (Austria) | | HUN (Hungary) | | LEC (France) | | CAT (Spain) | | | Points |

| Colour | Result |
|---|---|
| Gold | Winner |
| Silver | Second place |
| Bronze | Third place |
| Green | Points classification |
| Blue | Non-points classification |
| Blue | Non-classified finish (NC) |
| Purple | Retired, not classified (Ret) |
| Red | Did not qualify (DNQ) |
| Red | Did not pre-qualify (DNPQ) |
| Black | Disqualified (DSQ) |
| White | Did not start (DNS) |
| White | Withdrew (WD) |
| White | Race cancelled (C) |
| Blank | Did not practice (DNP) |
| Blank | Did not arrive (DNA) |
| Blank | Excluded (EX) |

**Bold** – Pole
Italics – Fastest Lap
