= Mauro Massironi =

Italian racing driver (born 1979)

- Nationality: (Italy) Italian
- Born: 11 November 1979 (age 46) Vimercate (Italy)

Porsche Supercup career
- Current team: Ebimotors
- Car number: 38

Mauro Massironi (born 11 November 1979, in Vimercate) is an Italian racing driver. He has competed in such series as Porsche Supercup, Eurocup Formula Renault 2.0 and the British Formula Three Championship. His active racing career dates back to 2000, driving a Tatuus FR2000 (Renault) for B&B Birel. In 2006, he was the champion of the Italian Formula Three Championship for Passoli Racing, when he drove a Dallara F304 (Opel).

== Complete Eurocup Formula Renault 2.0 results ==
(key) (Races in bold indicate pole position; races in italics indicate fastest lap)

Year	Entrant	1	2	3	4	5	6	7	8	9	10	11	12	13	14	15	16	DC	Points
2005	Alan Racing	ZOL; 1	ZOL; 2	VAL; 1	VAL; 2	LMS; 1	LMS; 2	BIL; 1	BIL; 2	OSC; 1	OSC; 2	DON; 1	DON; 2	EST; 1	EST; 2	MNZ; 1; 19	MNZ; 2; 22	NC†	0

† As Massironi was a guest driver, he was ineligible for points

Sporting positions
Preceded by Luigi Ferrara	Italian Formula Three Champion; 2006	Succeeded by Paolo Maria Nocera
