= Italian Formula Three Championship =

Former Single-Seater Motor Racing Championship

- Category: Single seaters
- Country: Italy
- Inaugural season: 1964
- Folded: 2012
- Drivers: 19
- Teams: 9
- Constructors: Dallara
- Engine suppliers: FPT
- Last Drivers' champion: E: Riccardo Agostini; I: Riccardo Agostini
- Last Teams' champion: E: Prema Powerteam; I: Prema Powerteam
- Official website: acisportitalia.it

The Italian Formula Three Championship was the Formula Three racing competition in Italy.

== History ==
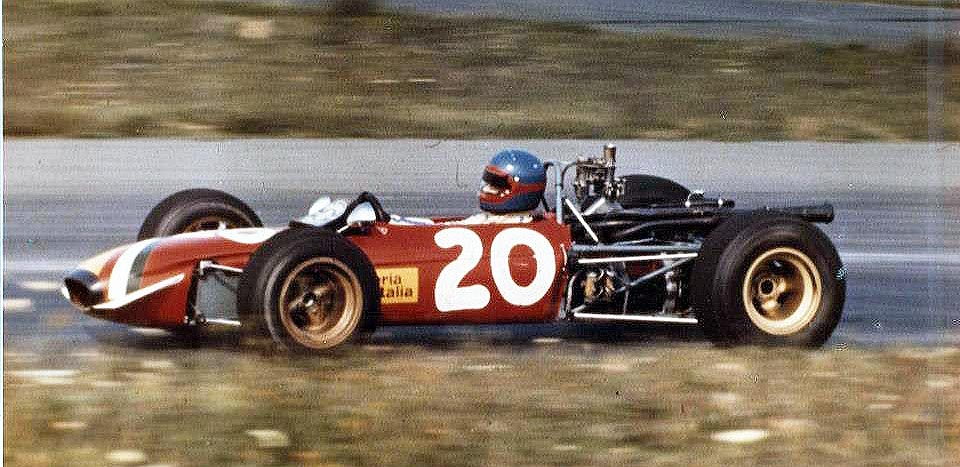
Gian Luigi Picchi on Tecno-Ford 69 during the winning 1969 season

Formula Three has traditionally been regarded as the first major stepping stone for F1 hopefuls - it is typically the first point in a driver's career at which most drivers in the series are aiming at professional careers in racing rather than being amateurs and enthusiasts. Success in F3 can lead directly to more senior formulae such as GP2, A1 Grand Prix, or even a Formula One test or race seat.

Most notably in the late 1980s and early 1990s, the Italian F3 championship produced drivers who graduated to Formula One to varying success. As of 2010, the last Italian Formula Three driver to graduate to Formula One was 1994 Italian F3 champion Giancarlo Fisichella, who debuted with Minardi's F1 team in 1996. Other champions include successful World Sportscar driver Max Angelelli (1992 series champion) and Riccardo Patrese.

In December 2012, CSAI (the Italian motorsports commission) announced it would cancel the Formula 3 championship to focus on Formula Abarth.

== Scoring system ==
- Since the 2012 season, points are awarded for race finishing drivers as follows:

	1	2	3	4	5	6	7	8	9	10	PP	FL
Feature races	20	15	12	10	8	5	4	3	2	1	1	1
Sprint	13	11	9	7	6	5	4	3	2	1		1

== Champions ==
Season	Champion	Team	Car
1964	(Italy) Giacomo "Geki" Russo	Scuderia Sorocaima	De Sanctis-Ford
1965	(Italy) Andrea de Adamich	Jolly Club	Lola-Ford T53; Brabham-Ford BT15
1966	(Italy) Tino Brambilla	Scuderia Madunina	Brabham-Ford BT15
1967	No championship title attributed		
1968	(Italy) Franco Bernabei		Tecno-Ford 68
1969	(Italy) Gian Luigi Picchi	Tecno Racing Team	Tecno-Ford 69
1970	(Italy) Giovanni Salvati		Tecno-Ford 70
1971	(Italy) Giancarlo Naddeo		Tecno-Ford 69
1972	(Italy) Vittorio Brambilla	Team Brambilla; Scuderia Italia	Birel-Alfa Romeo 72; Birel-Ford 72; Brabham-Ford BT38
1973	(Italy) Carlo Giorgio	Jolly Club; Trivellato Racing	Ensign-Ford LNF3; March-Ford 733
1974	(Italy) Alberto Colombo	Scuderia Del Lario	GRD-Ford 374; March-Ford 743; March-Toyota 743
1975	(Italy) Luciano Pavesi	Scuderia Ala d'Oro	Brabham-Toyota BT41; March-Toyota 753
1976	(Italy) Riccardo Patrese	Trivellato Racing	Chevron-Toyota B34
1977	(Italy) Elio de Angelis	Trivellato Racing	Chevron-Toyota B38; Ralt-Toyota RT1
1978	(Italy) Siegfried Stohr	Trivellato Racing	Chevron-Toyota B43
1979	(Italy) Piercarlo Ghinzani	Euroracing	March-Alfa Romeo 793
1980	(Italy) Guido Pardini	Scuderia Emiliani	Dallara-Toyota F380
1981	(Italy) Eddy Bianchi	Team del Porto	Martini-Toyota MK34; Martini-Alfa Romeo MK37
1982	(Italy) Enzo Coloni	Coloni Racing	March-Alfa Romeo 813; Ralt-Alfa Romeo RT3
1983	(Italy) Ivan Capelli	Coloni Racing	Ralt-Alfa Romeo RT3
1984	(Italy) Alessandro Santin	Coloni Racing	Ralt-Alfa Romeo RT3
1985	(Switzerland) Franco Forini	Forti Corse	Dallara-VW F385
1986	(Italy) Nicola Larini	Coloni Racing	Dallara-Alfa Romeo F386
1987	(Italy) Enrico Bertaggia	Forti Corse	Dallara-Alfa Romeo F387
1988	(Italy) Emanuele Naspetti	Forti Corse	Dallara-Alfa Romeo F388
1989	(Italy) Gianni Morbidelli	Forti Corse	Dallara-Alfa Romeo F389
1990	(Italy) Roberto Colciago	Prema Powerteam	Reynard-Alfa Romeo 903
1991	(Italy) Giambattista Busi	PiEmme Motors	Dallara-VW F391
1992	(Italy) Max Angelelli	RC Motorsport	Dallara-Opel F392
1993	(Italy) Christian Pescatori	Supercars	Dallara-Fiat F393
1994	(Italy) Giancarlo Fisichella	RC Motorsport	Dallara-Opel F394
1995	(Italy) Luca Rangoni	EF Project	Dallara-Fiat F395
1996	(Italy) Andrea Boldrini	RC Motorsport	Dallara-Opel F395
1997	(Italy) Oliver Martini	RC Motorsport	Dallara-Opel F397
1998	(Netherlands) Donny Crevels	Prema Powerteam	Dallara-Opel F397
1999	(Sweden) Peter Sundberg	Prema Powerteam	Dallara-Opel F399
2000	(Italy) Davide Uboldi	Uboldi Motorsport	Dallara-Opel F399
2001	(Italy) Lorenzo Del Gallo	Scuderia Del Gallo	Dallara-Fiat F301
2002	(Serbia and Montenegro) Miloš Pavlović	Target Racing Conrero	Dallara-Opel F302
2003	(Italy) Fausto Ippoliti	Target Racing Conrero	Dallara-Opel F303
2004	(Italy) Matteo Cressoni	Ombra Racing	Dallara-Mugen Honda F304
2005	(Italy) Luigi Ferrara	Corbetta	Dallara-Mugen Honda F304
2006	(Italy) Mauro Massironi	Passoli Racing	Dallara-Opel F304
2007	(Italy) Paolo Maria Nocera	Lucidi Motors	Dallara-Opel F304
2008	(Italy) Mirko Bortolotti	Lucidi Motors	Dallara-FPT F308
2009	(Italy) Daniel Zampieri	BVM - Target Racing	Dallara-FPT F308
2010	(Brazil) César Ramos	Lucidi Motors	Dallara-FPT F310
2011	(Italy) Sergio Campana	BVM - Target Racing	Dallara-FPT F308
2012	E: (Italy) Riccardo Agostini	JD Motorsport	Mygale-FPT M10
2012	I: (Italy) Riccardo Agostini	JD Motorsport	Mygale-FPT M10
