= Mirko Bortolotti =

Italian racing driver (born 1990)

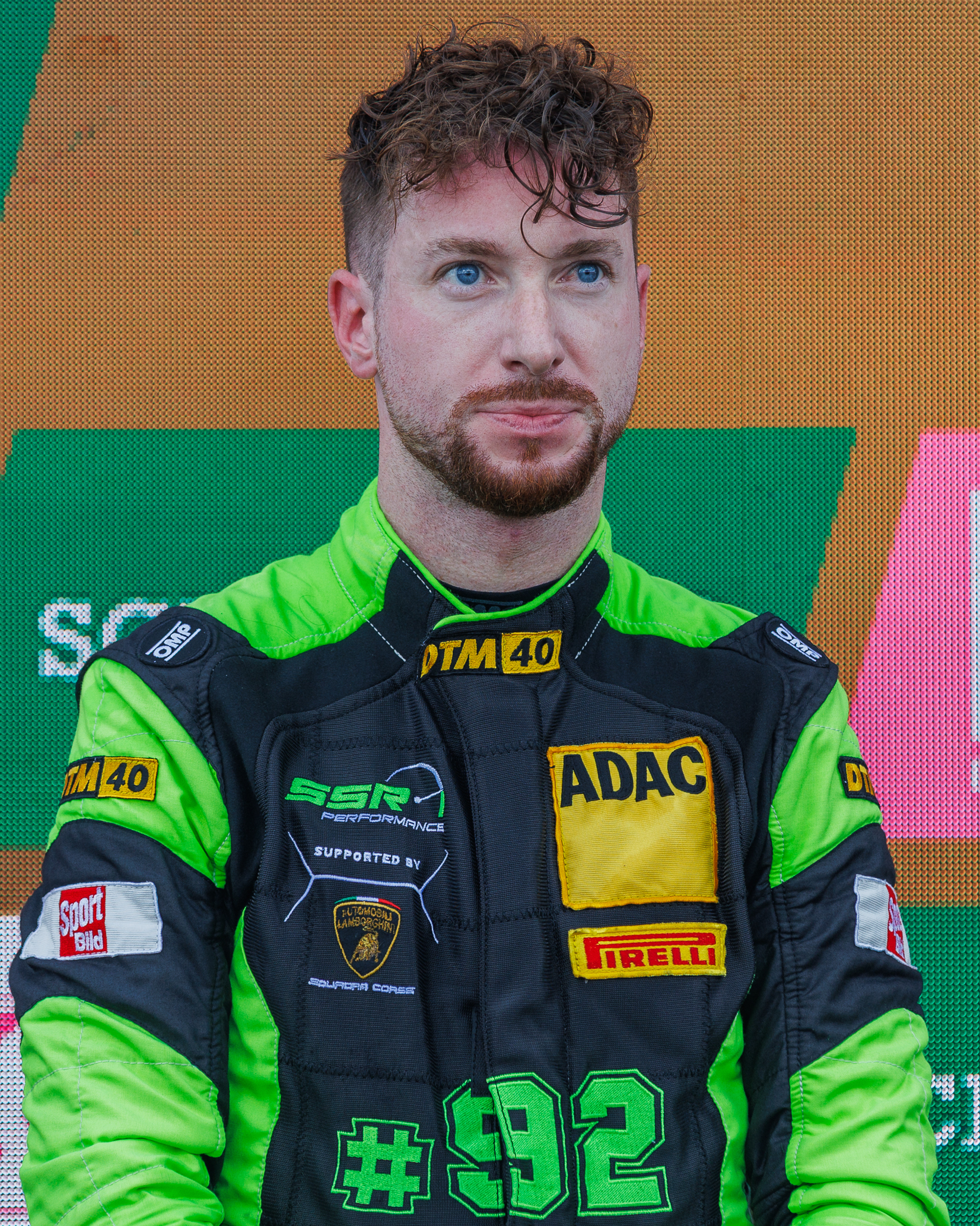
- Bortolotti in 2024
- Nationality: (Italy) Italian
- Born: 10 January 1990 (age 36) Trento, Italy

IMSA SportsCar Championship career
- Debut season: 2016
- Current team: Automobili Lamborghini Squadra Corse
- Categorisation: FIA Gold (until 2014); FIA Platinum (2015–)
- Car number: 63
- Starts: 18 (18 entries)
- Wins: 4
- Podiums: 7
- Poles: 1
- Fastest laps: 2
- Best finish: 16th (GTD Pro) in 2023

Previous series
- 2012, 2015–21 2014–16 2014 2013 2009, 11 2010 2009 2007–08 2006 2006 2005–07 2005: ADAC GT Masters; Italian GT Championship; Lamborghini Super Trofeo Europe; Eurocup Mégane Trophy; FIA Formula Two Championship; GP3 Series; Formula 3 Euro Series; Italian Formula Three; Formula Azzurra; Formula Junior 1600 Italy; FR 2.0 Italy Winter series Formula Gloria Italy

Championship titles
- 2024 2017 2013 2011 2008: DTM; Blancpain Endurance Cup; Eurocup Mégane Trophy; FIA Formula Two Championship; Italian Formula Three
Medal record
GT3
Representing Italy
FIA Motorsport Games
Silver medal – second place	2022 Le Castellet	GT Sprint

Mirko Bortolotti (born 10 January 1990) is an Italian racing driver, best known for his sports car racing success with Lamborghini. He currently competes in the Deutsche Tourenwagen Masters and the GT World Challenge Europe Endurance Cup for TGI Team by GRT.

A Red Bull and Ferrari protégé in his junior career, Bortolotti won Italian Formula 3 in 2008, FIA Formula 2 in 2011 and the Eurocup Mégane Trophy in 2013. He was a Formula One test driver for Ferrari, Toro Rosso and Williams before establishing himself in sports car racing. Bortolotti has been a Lamborghini factory driver since 2015, with a brief spell at Audi in 2020.

Considered one of the greatest ever Lamborghini drivers, Bortolotti won the Blancpain GT Series Overall and Endurance Cup titles in 2017, the Deutsche Tourenwagen Masters in 2024 and the Spa 24 Hours in 2025. He is a class winner at the 24 Hours of Daytona, 12 Hours of Sebring and Petit Le Mans. In 2024, Bortolotti spearheaded Lamborghini's entry into the FIA World Endurance Championship with the Lamborghini SC63 LMDh.

== Career ==
=== Italian series ===
After karting for several years, Bortolotti began his formula racing career in 2005 by competing in the Italian Formula Renault Winter Series and Formula Gloria. He competed in the Winter Series for a further two years, with a best finish of fourth in 2006. He also drove in the Italian Formula Junior 1600 championship for this year, in addition to the Formula Azzurra championship. In the latter series, he finished as runner-up in the drivers' championship, behind winner Giuseppe Termine.

In 2007, Bortolotti moved up to Italian Formula Three, finishing fourth in the championship at his first attempt. He remained in the series for 2008, driving for the Lucidi Motors team, and won the championship with nine wins and six pole positions from the sixteen races.

=== FIA Formula Two Championship ===
Bortolotti obtained backing from Red Bull following his championship win; the company opted to place him in the relaunched FIA Formula Two Championship in 2009. He drove car number 14 in the series, and finished fourth. During the break between the final two rounds of the season, Bortolotti returned to Formula Three to compete for Carlin Motorsport in the Formula 3 Euro Series season finale at Hockenheim, finishing on the podium in the second race.

=== GP3 Series ===
Bortolotti's next move was to the newly created GP3 Series. He drove in the 2010 season for Addax Team alongside teammates Felipe Guimarães and Pablo Sánchez López and managed some good results, finishing 11th and getting a podium in his final race.

=== Return to FIA Formula Two Championship ===
Bortolotti decided to return to FIA Formula Two Championship for 2011. His season began well as he took the lead in the championship after the first round. He lost it to Christopher Zanella, later regaining the lead at the third round. He dominated the fourth round of the season at the Nürburgring, taking pole position, victory and the fastest lap in both races. He led the rest of the season and eventually won the championship by 100 points over Zanella.

=== Formula One ===
As a reward for their performances in the 2008 Italian F3 championship, Bortolotti, Edoardo Piscopo and Salvatore Cicatelli were all given a test of the Ferrari team's F2008 chassis at the Fiorano Circuit in November 2008. Bortolotti impressed by setting a time of 59.111 seconds, quicker than the previous fastest lap set by the F2008 at the circuit by any driver.

In 2009, among several other drivers, Bortolotti was linked to a drive with Ferrari as a replacement for injured Felipe Massa, after poor performances by Luca Badoer.

In 2011, Bortolotti was selected by Williams to appear in their car at the 2011 young drivers test in Abu Dhabi.

=== GT Racing ===
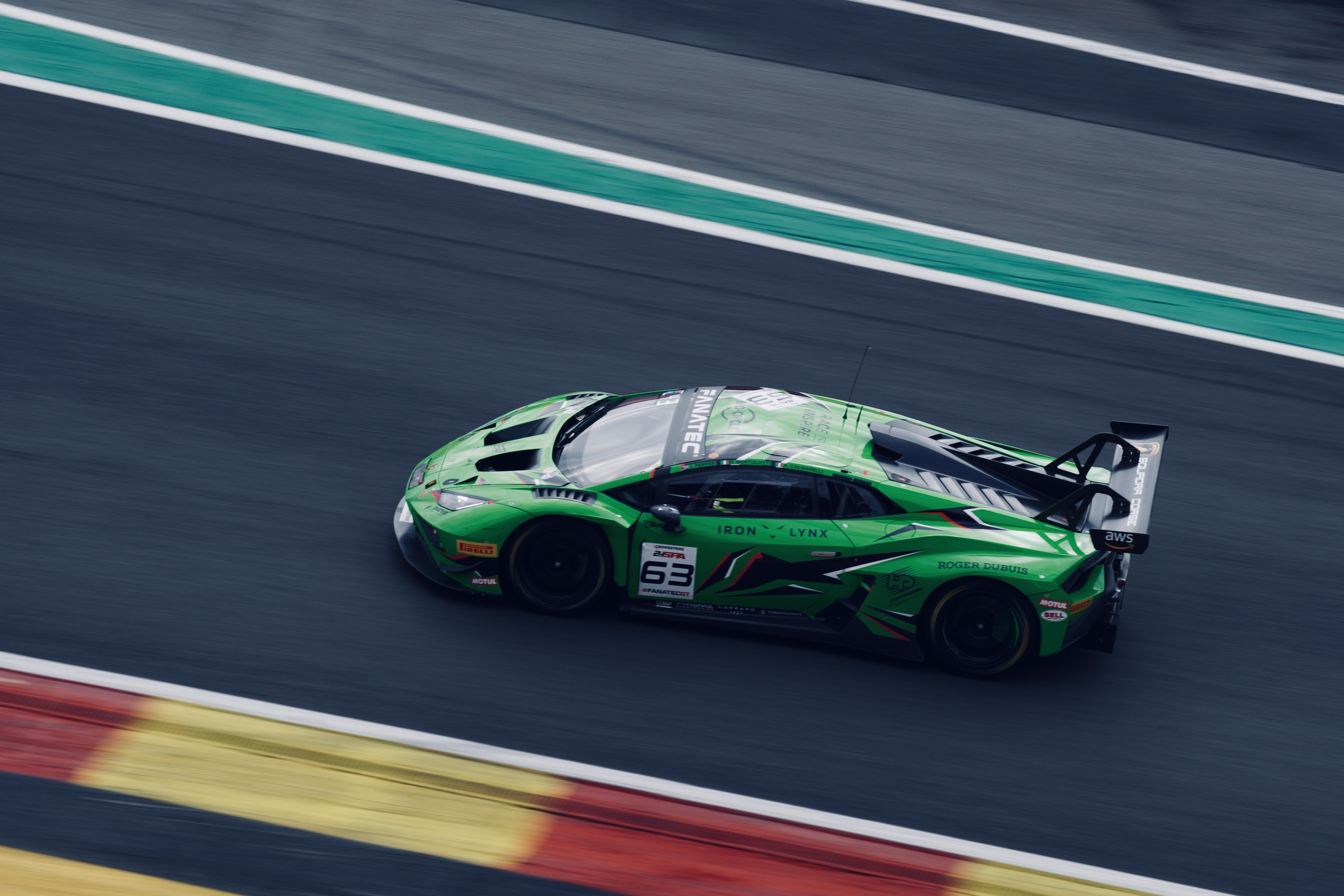
Iron Lynx's #63 Lamborghini Huracán GT3 during the 2023 24 Hours of Spa

After his single-seater career, Bortolotti transitioned to GT racing and became a Lamborghini factory driver in 2015. He achieved notable success in GT3 competition, winning races in major endurance and sprint series, including the Blancpain GT Series and the Rolex 24 at Daytona. Bortolotti has stated that adapting to GT racing required a change in driving approach, particularly in tyre management and race strategy. His experience in GT racing later contributed to his success in touring car competition, culminating in winning the 2024 Deutsche Tourenwagen Masters (DTM) championship, the first drivers' title for Lamborghini in the series.

In 2017, Bortolotti won the Endurance Cup of the Blancpain GT Series with GRT Grasser Racing Team and won the overall driver championship with his teammate Christian Engelhart.

In 2020, Bortolotti moved from Lamborghini to Audi. Now, he is racing R8 LMS GT3 EVO in the GT World Challenge Europe Series (formerly Blancpain GT Series) Endurance Cup and ADAC GT Masters with WRT (Belgian Club W Racing Team). In the GT World Challenge Europe Series, he shared the car with Kelvin van der Linde and Rolf Ineichen in Car No. 31, and car No. 30 with Rolf Ineichen in the ADAC GT Masters, respectively.

2023 saw Bortolotti join Andrea Caldarelli and Jordan Pepper in Iron Lynx's Pro class effort in the GT World Challenge Europe Endurance Cup.

=== Deutsche Tourenwagen Masters ===
In September 2021, Bortolotti made his debut in the Deutsche Tourenwagen Masters as a guest driver for T3 Motorsport as the German team fielded a third Lamborghini Huracán GT3 Evo car in the sixth round of the 2021 DTM season at Assen. There, he finished second in the first race on Saturday and seventh in the second race on Sunday. In February 2022, Bortolotti earned a full-time seat for the 2022 DTM season with GRT Grasser Racing Team as the Austrian team joined the series by fielding four Lamborghini Huracán GT3 Evo cars with factory-backing from the Italian manufacturer.

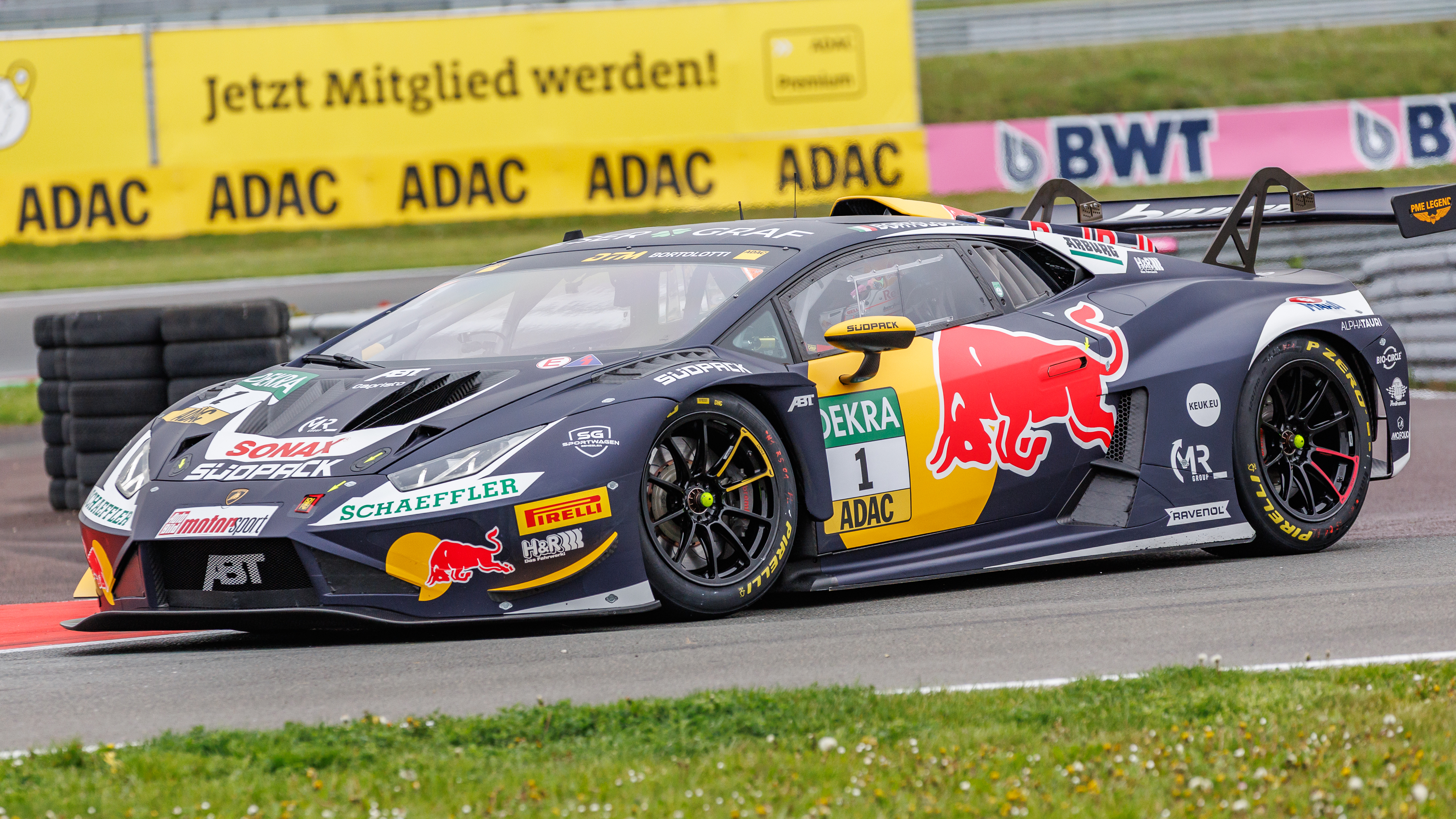
Bortolotti at Motorsport Arena Oschersleben in 2025

In the first round of the 2022 DTM season at Portimão, Bortolotti finished third in both races. He qualified on pole position for the first race of the weekend and led 19 laps, but his car suffered a sudden loss of power after a safety-car period and he fell to sixth position with ten laps to go, before recovering to fourth and eventually overtaking the Mercedes of Maro Engel on the final lap for third, with Mercedes drivers Lucas Auer and Luca Stolz finishing in front of him. In the first race of the third round at Imola, Bortolotti scored his third podium finish of the season, recovering to third after starting from 16th due to a ten-place grid penalty for using a wrong set of tyres. After experiencing his first retirement of the season in the first race of the fourth round at the Norisring, he finished second in the second race of the weekend and moved to the top of the drivers' standings with half the season completed.

== Racing record ==
=== Career summary ===
Season	Series	Team	Races	Wins	Poles	F/Laps	Podiums	Points	Position
2005	Italian Formula Renault 2.0 - Winter Series	Auinger	4	0	0	?	0	8	13th
2005	Formula Gloria Italy	?	2	0	0	0	?	12	21st
2005	Italian Formula Junior 1600	AP Motorsport	?	?	?	?	?	20	14th
2006	Formula Azzurra	Team Italia CSAI	14	1	5	0	5	60	**2nd**
2006	Italian Formula Renault 2.0 - Winter Series	RP Motorsport	4	0	0	0	1	88	4th
2006	Italian Formula Junior 1600	RP Motorsport	?	0	?	?	0	40	13th
2007	Italian Formula 3 Championship	Corbetta Competizioni	16	1	2	1	7	80	4th
2007	Italian Formula Renault 2.0 - Winter Series	Tomcat Racing	4	0	0	0	0	34	12th
2008	Italian Formula 3 Championship	Lucidi Motors	16	9	6	5	15	150	**1st**
2009	FIA Formula Two Championship	MotorSport Vision	16	1	0	1	5	50	4th
2009	Formula 3 Euro Series	Carlin Motorsport	2	0	0	0	1	0	NC†
2010	GP3 Series	Addax Team	16	0	0	0	1	16	11th
2011	FIA Formula Two Championship	MotorSport Vision	16	7	7	7	14	316	**1st**
2012	ADAC GT Masters	Schubert Motorsport	4	0	0	0	1	15	29th
2013	Eurocup Mégane Trophy	Oregon Team	14	8	13	7	11	275	**1st**
2014	Lamborghini Super Trofeo Europe - Pro-Am	Bonaldi Motorsport	9	3	4	6	6	87	4th
2014	Lamborghini Super Trofeo World Final	N/A	2	1	0	0	1	N/A	NC
2014	Italian GT Championship	Imperiale Racing Srl	8	2	3	0	3	53	14th
2014	Formula Acceleration 1	Acceleration Team Italy	8	3	3	2	7	135	**2nd**
2015	Italian GT Championship	Imperiale Racing	14	3	2	3	6	113	4th
2015	Blancpain Endurance Series	GRT Grasser Racing Team	5	0	2	0	0	29	12th
2015	Blancpain Sprint Series	GRT Grasser Racing Team	2	0	0	0	2	21	17th
2015	ADAC GT Masters	GRT Grasser Racing Team	2	1	0	1	1	0	NC†
2016	Italian GT Championship	Imperiale Racing	14	4	5	1	8	108	6th
2016	Blancpain GT Series Sprint Cup	GRT Grasser Racing Team	10	0	0	0	1	16	17th
2016	Blancpain GT Series Endurance Cup	GRT Grasser Racing Team	5	1	1	0	2	49	7th
2016	ADAC GT Masters	GRT Grasser Racing Team	4	0	0	0	0	16	34th
2016	IMSA SportsCar Championship - GTD	Paul Miller Racing	1	0	0	0	0	16	58th
2016	FIA GT World Cup	FFF Racing	1	0	0	0	0	N/A	9th
2017	Blancpain GT Series Sprint Cup	GRT Grasser Racing Team	10	2	1	2	4	67	4th
2017	Blancpain GT Series Endurance Cup	GRT Grasser Racing Team	5	2	0	1	3	86	**1st**
2017	ADAC GT Masters	GRT Grasser Racing Team	12	1	2	1	2	55	18th
2017	IMSA SportsCar Championship - GTD	GRT Grasser Racing Team	2	0	0	0	0	38	50th
2017	Intercontinental GT Challenge	GRT Grasser Racing Team	1	0	0	0	0	0	NC
2017	24H Series - A6	GRT Grasser Racing Team							
2017	FIA GT World Cup	FFF Racing Team by ACM	0	0	0	0	0	N/A	DNS
2018	ADAC GT Masters	Orange1 by GRT Grasser	14	1	0	1	3	64	7th
2018	Blancpain GT Series Sprint Cup	GRT Grasser Racing Team	9	2	2	0	3	57.5	5th
2018	Blancpain GT Series Endurance Cup	GRT Grasser Racing Team	5	0	0	0	0	13	31st
2018	IMSA SportsCar Championship - GTD	GRT Grasser Racing Team	1	1	0	0	1	35	45th
2018	24H GT Series - A6	GRT Grasser Racing Team							
2019	ADAC GT Masters	Orange1 by GRT Grasser	14	3	3	1	4	146	**2nd**
2019	Blancpain GT World Challenge Europe	GRT Grasser Racing Team	10	0	1	0	6	75	4th
2019	Blancpain GT Series Endurance Cup	GRT Grasser Racing Team	4	0	2	1	0	21	13th
2019	IMSA SportsCar Championship - GTD	GRT Grasser Racing Team	2	2	0	1	2	70	35th
2019	24H GT Series - A6	GRT Grasser Racing Team							
2020	ADAC GT Masters	Team WRT	8	0	0	1	2	58	16th
2020	GT World Challenge Europe Endurance Cup	Belgian Audi Club Team WRT	3	1	0	0	1	52	4th
2020	24H GT Series - GT3	Belgian Audi Club Team WRT							
2020	IMSA SportsCar Championship - GTD	WRT Speedstar Audi Sport	1	0	0	1	1	30	41st
2020	Intercontinental GT Challenge	Audi Sport Team Valvoline	1	0	0	0	0	30	6th
2020	Intercontinental GT Challenge	Audi Sport Team Hardpoint WRT	1	0	0	0	0	30	6th
2020	Intercontinental GT Challenge	Audi Sport Team WRT	1	0	0	0	1	30	6th
2020	24 Hours of Nürburgring - SP9	Audi Sport Team Car Collection	1	0	0	0	1	N/A	**2nd**
2021	ADAC GT Masters	GRT Grasser Racing Team	14	1	2	1	4	145	5th
2021	IMSA SportsCar Championship - GTD	GRT Grasser Racing Team	2	0	0	0	1	160	74th
2021	24H GT Series - GT3	GRT Grasser Racing Team							
2021	GT World Challenge Europe Endurance Cup	Orange 1 FFF Racing Team	5	1	2	1	2	73	4th
2021	Deutsche Tourenwagen Masters	T3 Motorsport	2	0	0	1	1	0	NC†
2021	Intercontinental GT Challenge	Orange 1 FFF Racing Team	1	0	0	0	0	23	9th
2021	Intercontinental GT Challenge	K-PAX Racing	1	0	0	0	1	23	9th
2021	24 Hours of Nürburgring - SP9	Hankook FFF Racing Team	1	0	0	0	0	N/A	DNF
2022	Deutsche Tourenwagen Masters	GRT	16	0	2	3	5	121	4th
2022	IMSA SportsCar Championship - GTD Pro	TR3 Racing	2	0	1	0	1	577	17th
2022	GT World Challenge Europe Endurance Cup	Emil Frey Racing	5	0	0	1	1	32	15th
2022	Intercontinental GT Challenge	Emil Frey Racing	1	0	0	0	0	0	NC
2022	24H GT Series - GT3	Barwell Motorsport							
2022	24 Hours of Le Mans - LMP2	Team WRT	1	0	0	0	0	N/A	11th
2022	FIA Motorsport Games GT Sprint	Team Italy	1	0	0	0	1	N/A	**2nd**
2023	Deutsche Tourenwagen Masters	SSR Performance	15	3	3	0	5	213	**2nd**
2023	FIA World Endurance Championship - LMP2	Prema Racing	5	0	1	0	1	56	11th
2023	24 Hours of Le Mans - LMP2	Prema Racing	1	0	0	0	0	N/A	DNF
2023	IMSA SportsCar Championship - GTD Pro	Iron Lynx	2	0	0	0	0	579	16th
2023	GT World Challenge Europe Endurance Cup	Iron Lynx	5	0	0	0	1	15	14th
2024	Deutsche Tourenwagen Masters	SSR Performance	16	1	3	0	7	238	**1st**
2024	FIA World Endurance Championship - Hypercar	Lamborghini Iron Lynx	8	0	0	0	0	2	31st
2024	IMSA SportsCar Championship - GTD Pro	Iron Lynx	3	1	0	0	2	970	18th
2024	GT World Challenge Europe Endurance Cup	Iron Lynx	4	0	1	0	1	21	14th
2025	Deutsche Tourenwagen Masters	Abt Sportsline	16	0	0	0	0	68	14th
2025	IMSA SportsCar Championship - GTP	Automobili Lamborghini Squadra Corse	2	0	0	0	0	412	32nd
2025	Nürburgring Langstrecken-Serie - SP9	Red Bull Team ABT							
2025	24 Hours of Nürburgring - SP9	Red Bull Team ABT	1	0	0	0	0	N/A	DNF
2025	GT World Challenge Europe Endurance Cup	GRT - Grasser Racing Team	5	1	0	0	1	44	5th
2025	International GT Open	Oregon Team	2	0	0	0	0	8	26th
2026	IMSA SportsCar Championship - GTD Pro	Pfaff Motorsports	1	0	0	0	0	271	35th
2026	Deutsche Tourenwagen Masters	TGI Team by GRT	16	0	0	0	1	97	13th
2026	GT World Challenge Europe Endurance Cup	TGI Team by GRT	5	0	0	0	0	0	NC
2026	Nürburgring Langstrecken-Serie - SP9	Team ABT Sportsline							
2026	24 Hours of Nürburgring - SP9	Red Bull Team Abt	1	0	1	0	0	N/A	DSQ

^{†} As Bortolotti was a guest driver, he was ineligible to score points
^{*} Season still in progress.

=== Complete FIA Formula Two Championship results ===
(key) (Races in bold indicate pole position) (Races in italics indicate fastest lap)

Year	1	2	3	4	5	6	7	8	9	10	11	12	13	14	15	16	Pos	Points
2009	VAL; 1; 6	VAL; 2; 2	BRN; 1; 1	BRN; 2 Ret	SPA; 1; 9	SPA; 2; 9	BRH; 1 Ret	BRH; 2; 5	DON; 1; 10	DON; 2; 3	OSC; 1; 2	OSC; 2 Ret	IMO; 1; 2	IMO; 2 Ret	CAT; 1; 6	CAT; 2 Ret	4th	50
2011	**SIL**; **1**; 1	SIL; 2; 2	MAG; 1; 6	MAG; 2; 3	SPA; 1; 2	SPA; 2; 1	**NÜR**; **1**; 1	**NÜR**; **2**; 1	BRH; 1; 5	**BRH**; **2**; 2	RBR; 1; 2	RBR; 2; 2	MON; 1; 2	**MON**; **2**; 1	**CAT**; **1**; 1	**CAT**; **2**; 1	1st	316

=== Complete Formula 3 Euro Series results ===
(key) (Races in bold indicate pole position) (Races in italics indicate fastest lap)

Year	Entrant	Chassis	Engine	1	2	3	4	5	6	7	8	9	10	11	12	13	14	15	16	17	18	19	20	DC	Points	Ref
2009	Carlin Motorsport	Dallara F308	Volkswagen	HOC; 1	HOC; 2	LAU; 1	LAU; 2	NOR; 1	NOR; 2	ZAN; 1	ZAN; 2	OSC; 1	OSC; 2	NÜR; 1	NÜR; 2	BRH; 1	BRH; 2	CAT; 1	CAT; 2	DIJ; 1	DIJ; 2	HOC; 1; 17	HOC; 2; 3	NC†	0†	

^{†} As Bortolotti was a guest driver, he was ineligible for championship points.

=== Complete GP3 Series results ===
(key) (Races in bold indicate pole position) (Races in italics indicate fastest lap)

Year	Entrant	1	2	3	4	5	6	7	8	9	10	11	12	13	14	15	16	DC	Points
2010	Addax Team	CAT; FEA; 16	CAT; SPR; Ret	IST; FEA; 25†	IST; SPR; 12	VAL; FEA; 18	VAL; SPR; 10	SIL; FEA; 8	SIL; SPR; 13	HOC; FEA; 6	HOC; SPR; 4	HUN; FEA; 11	HUN; SPR; 8	SPA; FEA; Ret	SPA; SPR; 14	MNZ; FEA; 5	MNZ; SPR; 2	11th	16

^{†} Bortolotti did not finish the race, but was classified as he completed over 90% of the race distance.

=== Complete ADAC GT Masters results ===
(key) (Races in bold indicate pole position) (Races in italics indicate fastest lap)

Year	Team	Car	1	2	3	4	5	6	7	8	9	10	11	12	13	14	15	16	Pos.	Points
2012	Schubert Motorsport	BMW Z4 GT3	OSC; 1	OSC; 2	ZAN; 1	ZAN; 2	SAC; 1; 25	SAC; 2; 3	NÜR; 1; 14	NÜR; 2; 16	RBR; 1	RBR; 2	LAU; 1	LAU; 2	NÜR; 1	NÜR; 2	HOC; 1	HOC; 2	29th	15
2015	Grasser Racing Team	Lamborghini Huracán GT3	OSC; 1	OSC; 2	RBR; 1; 6	RBR; 2; 1	SPA; 1	SPA; 2	LAU; 1	LAU; 2	NÜR; 1	NÜR; 2	SAC; 1	SAC; 2	ZAN; 1	ZAN; 2	HOC; 1	HOC; 2	NC‡	0‡
2016	GRT Grasser Racing Team	Lamborghini Huracán GT3	OSC; 1	OSC; 2	SAC; 1	SAC; 2	LAU; 1; 5	LAU; 2; 7	RBR; 1	RBR; 2	NÜR; 1	NÜR; 2	ZAN; 1; 11	ZAN; 2; 14	HOC; 1	HOC; 2			34th	16
2017	GRT Grasser Racing Team	Lamborghini Huracán GT3	OSC; 1; 13	OSC; 2; 21	LAU; 1; 3	**LAU**; **2**; 1	RBR; 1; 21	RBR; 2; 8	ZAN; 1; 22	**ZAN**; **2** Ret	NÜR; 1; 10	NÜR; 2; 9	SAC; 1	SAC; 2	HOC; 1 Ret	HOC; 2; 6			18th	55
2018	GRT Grasser Racing Team	Lamborghini Huracán GT3	OSC; 1 DSQ	OSC; 2; 1	MST; 1; 10	MST; 2; 12	RBR; 1; 32	RBR; 2; 2	NÜR; 1; 2	NÜR; 2; 15	ZAN; 1 Ret	ZAN; 2; 24	SAC; 1; 26	SAC; 2 Ret	HOC; 1; 13	HOC; 2; 9			7th	64
2019	GRT Grasser Racing Team	Lamborghini Huracán GT3 Evo	OSC; 1 Ret	**OSC**; **2**; 21	MST; 1; 2	MST; 2; 23	RBR; 1; 25	RBR; 2; 5	**ZAN**; **1**; 1	ZAN; 2; 6	**NÜR**; **1**; 1	NÜR; 2 Ret	HOC; 1; 1	HOC; 2; 8	SAC; 1; 5	SAC; 2; 6			**2nd**	**146**
2020	Team WRT	Audi R8 LMS Evo	LAU; 1 Ret	LAU; 2; 7	NÜR; 1; 18	NÜR; 2; 4	HOC; 1 Ret	HOC; 2; 3	SAC; 1	SAC; 2	RBR; 1 WD	RBR; 2 WD	LAU; 1	LAU; 2	OSC; 1; 16	OSC; 2; 2			16th	58
2021	GRT Grasser Racing Team	Lamborghini Huracán GT3 Evo	OSC; 1; 2	OSC; 2 Ret	**RBR**; **1**; 2	RBR; 2; 4	ZAN; 1; 12	ZAN; 2; 10	LAU; 1; 3	LAU; 2; 5	SAC; 1 Ret	SAC; 2; 11	**HOC**; **1**; 1	HOC; 2; 19	NÜR; 1 Ret	NÜR; 2; 4			5th	145

‡ As Bortolotti was a guest driver, he was ineligible to score points

=== Complete Eurocup Mégane Trophy results ===
(key) (Races in bold indicate pole position) (Races in italics indicate fastest lap)

Year	Entrant	1	2	3	4	5	6	7	8	9	10	11	12	13	14	15	DC	Points
2013	Oregon Team	**ALC**; **1**; 1	**ALC**; **2**; 1	**SPA**; **1**; 4	SPA; 2; 1	**MSC**; **1**; 1	**MSC**; **2**; 2	**RBR**; **1**; 1	**RBR**; **2**; 1	**HUN**; **1**; 1	**HUN**; **2**; 4	**LEC**; **1**; 2	LEC; 2 C	**CAT**; **1**; 1	**CAT**; **2** DSQ	**CAT**; **3**; 3	1st	275

=== Complete Formula Acceleration 1 results ===
(key) (Races in bold indicate pole position) (Races in italics indicate fastest lap)

Year	Team	1	2	3	4	5	6	7	8	9	10	Pos	Points
2014	Italy	**ALG**; **1**; 1	**ALG**; **2**; 1	NAV; 1; 2	**NAV**; **2**; 2	NÜR; 1; 2	NÜR; 2; 1	MNZ; 1; 3	MNZ; 2; 11	ASS; 1	ASS; 2	2nd	135

=== Complete GT World Challenge Europe results ===
==== GT World Challenge Europe Endurance Cup ====
Year	Team	Car	Class	1	2	3	4	5	6	7	Pos.	Points
2015	Grasser Racing Team	Lamborghini Huracán GT3	Pro	MNZ; 25	SIL; 8	**LEC**; 6	SPA; 6H; 5	SPA; 12H; 37	SPA; 24H; Ret	**NÜR**; 6	12th	29
2016	GRT Grasser Racing Team	Lamborghini Huracán GT3	Pro	MNZ; 8	**SIL**; 3	LEC; Ret	SPA; 6H; 10	SPA; 12H; 6	SPA; 24H; 11	NÜR; 1	7th	49
2017	GRT Grasser Racing Team	Lamborghini Huracán GT3	Pro	MNZ; 1	SIL; 1	LEC; 13	SPA; 6H; 2	SPA; 12H; 1	SPA; 24H; Ret	CAT; 3	1st	86
2018	GRT Grasser Racing Team	Lamborghini Huracán GT3	Pro	MNZ; 4	SIL; 10	LEC; 13	SPA; 6H; 55	SPA; 12H; 59	SPA; 24H; Ret	CAT; 13	31st	13
2019	GRT Grasser Racing Team	Lamborghini Huracán GT3 Evo	Pro	**MNZ**; 40	**SIL**; 36	LEC; 7	SPA; 6H; 2	SPA; 12H; 6	SPA; 24H; 16	CAT	13th	21
2020	Belgian Audi Club Team WRT	Audi R8 LMS Evo	Pro	IMO; 1	NÜR; 4	SPA; 6H	SPA; 12H	SPA; 24H	LEC; 5		4th	52
2021	Orange 1 FFF Racing Team	Lamborghini Huracán GT3 Evo	Pro	**MNZ**; 24	**LEC**; 3	SPA; 6H; 2	SPA; 12H; 10	SPA; 24H; 8	**NÜR**; 1	**CAT**; 4	4th	73
2022	Emil Frey Racing	Lamborghini Huracán GT3 Evo	Pro	IMO; 13	LEC; 6	SPA; 6H; 40	SPA; 12H; Ret	SPA; 24H; Ret	HOC; 6	BAR; 3	15th	32
2023	Iron Lynx	Lamborghini Huracán GT3 Evo 2	Pro	MNZ; 3	LEC; 39†	SPA; 6H; 61	SPA; 12H; Ret	SPA; 24H; Ret	NÜR; Ret	CAT; 20	14th	15
2024	Iron Lynx	Lamborghini Huracán GT3 Evo 2	Pro	**LEC**; 2	SPA; 6H; 57†	SPA; 12H; Ret	SPA; 24H; Ret	NÜR; 9	MNZ; 18	JED	14th	21
2025	GRT Grasser Racing Team	Lamborghini Huracán GT3 Evo 2	Pro	LEC; 12	MNZ; 46†	SPA; 6H; 23	SPA; 12H; 2	SPA; 24H; 1	NÜR; 5	CAT; 16	5th	44
2026	TGI Team by GRT	Lamborghini Temerario GT3	Pro	LEC; 39	MNZ; Ret	SPA; 6H; 60	SPA; 12H; 60†	SPA; 24H; Ret	NÜR; 18	ALG; 51	NC	0

^{*} Season still in progress.

==== GT World Challenge Europe Sprint Cup ====
Year	Team	Car	Class	1	2	3	4	5	6	7	8	9	10	11	12	13	14	Pos.	Points	Ref
2015	Grasser Racing Team	Lamborghini Huracán GT3	Pro	NOG; QR	NOG; CR	BRH; QR	BRH; CR	ZOL; QR	ZOL; CR	MOS; QR	MOS; CR	ALG; QR	ALG; CR	MIS; QR; 2	MIS; CR; 3	ZAN; QR	ZAN; CR	17th	21	
2016	GRT Grasser Racing Team	Lamborghini Huracán GT3	Pro	MIS; QR; Ret	MIS; CR; 12	BRH; QR; 7	BRH; CR; 24	NÜR; QR; Ret	NÜR; CR; Ret	HUN; QR; 8	HUN; CR; 14	CAT; QR; 2	CAT; CR; 5					17th	16	
2017	GRT Grasser Racing Team	Lamborghini Huracán GT3	Pro	MIS; QR; 8	MIS; CR; 9	**BRH**; **QR**; 1	BRH; CR; 1	ZOL; QR; Ret	ZOL; CR; 15	HUN; QR; 2	HUN; CR; 3	NÜR; QR; 19	NÜR; CR; 5					4th	67	
2018	GRT Grasser Racing Team	Lamborghini Huracán GT3	Pro	ZOL; 1; 1	**ZOL**; **2**; 7	BRH; 1; 10	BRH; 2; 5	MIS; 1; 3	MIS; 2; 18	HUN; 1; 1	HUN; 2; 6	**NÜR**; **1** DSQ	NÜR; 2 EX					5th	57.5	
2019	GRT Grasser Racing Team	Lamborghini Huracán GT3	Pro	BRH; 1; 3	BRH; 2; 10	MIS; 1; 6	MIS; 2; 16	ZAN; 1; 2	ZAN; 2; 2	**NÜR**; **1**; 2	NÜR; 2; 8	HUN; 1; 3	HUN; 2; 2					4th	75	

=== Complete IMSA SportsCar Championship results ===
(key) (Races in bold indicate pole position; races in italics indicate fastest lap)

Year	Entrant	Class	Make	Engine	1	2	3	4	5	6	7	8	9	10	11	12	Rank	Points	Ref
2016	Paul Miller Racing	GTD	Lamborghini Huracán GT3	Lamborghini 5.2 L V10	DAY; 16	SEB	LGA	DET	WGL	MOS	LIM	ELK	VIR	COA	PET		59th	16	
2017	GRT Grasser Racing Team	GTD	Lamborghini Huracán GT3	Lamborghini 5.2 L V10	DAY; 15	SEB; 9	LBH	AUS	BEL	WGL	MOS	LIM	ELK	VIR	LGA	PET	50th	38	
2018	GRT Grasser Racing Team	GTD	Lamborghini Huracán GT3	Lamborghini 5.2 L V10	DAY; 1	SEB	MDO	BEL	WGL	MOS	LIM	ELK	VIR	LGA	PET		45th	35	
2019	GRT Grasser Racing Team	GTD	Lamborghini Huracán GT3 Evo	Lamborghini 5.2 L V10	DAY; 1	SEB; 1	MDO	DET	WGL	MOS	LIM	ELK	VIR	LGA	PET		35th	70	
2020	WRT Speedstar Audi Sport	GTD	Audi R8 LMS Evo	Audi 5.2 L V10	DAY; 3	DAY	SEB	ELK	VIR	ATL	MDO	CLT	PET	LGA	SEB		41st	30	
2021	GRT Grasser Racing Team	GTD	Lamborghini Huracán GT3 Evo	Lamborghini 5.2 L V10	DAY; 18	SEB	MDO	DET	WGL	WGL	LIM	ELK	LGA	LBH	VIR	PET	74th	160	
2022	TR3 Racing	GTD Pro	Lamborghini Huracán GT3 Evo	Lamborghini 5.2 L V10	**DAY**; 12	SEB; 2	LBH	LGA	WGL	MOS	LIM	ELK	VIR	PET			17th	577	
2023	Iron Lynx	GTD Pro	Lamborghini Huracán GT3 Evo 2	Lamborghini 5.2 L V10	DAY; 4	SEB	LBH	LGA	WGL	MOS	LIM	ELK	VIR	IMS	PET; 6		16th	579	
2024	Iron Lynx	GTD Pro	Lamborghini Huracán GT3 Evo 2	Lamborghini 5.2 L V10	DAY; 7	SEB; 3	LGA	DET	WGL	MOS	ELK	VIR	IMS	PET; 1			18th	970	
2025	Automobili Lamborghini Squadra Corse	GTP	Lamborghini SC63	Lamborghini 3.8 L Turbo V8	DAY; 12	SEB; 13	LBH	LGA	DET	WGL	ELK	IMS	PET				32nd	412	
2026	Pfaff Motorsports	GTD Pro	Lamborghini Huracán GT3 Evo 2	Lamborghini 5.2 L V10	DAY; 6	SEB	LGA	DET	WGL	MOS	ELK	VIR	IMS	PET			35th	271	

=== Complete Bathurst 12 Hour results ===
Year	Team	Co-Drivers	Car	Class	Laps	Pos.	Class Pos.
2020	(Australia) Audi Sport Team Valvoline	(Germany) Christopher Mies (Australia) Garth Tander	Audi R8 LMS Evo	GT3 Pro	61	DNF	DNF

=== Complete Deutsche Tourenwagen Masters results ===
(key) (Races in bold indicate pole position; races in italics indicate fastest lap)

Year	Entrant	Chassis	1	2	3	4	5	6	7	8	9	10	11	12	13	14	15	16	Rank	Points
2021	T3 Motorsport	Lamborghini Huracán GT3 Evo	MNZ; 1	MNZ; 2	LAU; 1	LAU; 2	ZOL; 1	ZOL; 2	NÜR; 1	NÜR; 2	RBR; 1	RBR; 2	ASS; 1; 2	ASS; 2; 7	HOC; 1	HOC; 2	NOR; 1	NOR; 2	NC†	0†
2022	GRT	Lamborghini Huracán GT3 Evo	**ALG**; **1**; 3^{1}	ALG; 2; 3^{2}	LAU; 1; 6	LAU; 2; 6	IMO; 1; 3	IMO; 2; 10	NOR; 1 Ret	NOR; 2; 2^{2}	**NÜR**; **1** Ret	NÜR; 2; 19	SPA; 1; 8	SPA; 2; 10	RBR; 1; 3	RBR; 2; 8	HOC; 1; 7^{3}	HOC; 2 Ret	4th	121
2023	SSR Performance	Lamborghini Huracán GT3 Evo 2	OSC; 1; 8^{3}	OSC; 2; 6	ZAN; 1; 4	ZAN; 2; 11	NOR; 1; 6	NOR; 2; 4	**NÜR**; **1**; 1^{1}	NÜR; 2 DNS	LAU; 1; 2^{2}	**LAU**; **2**; 1^{1}	SAC; 1; 9	**SAC**; **2**; 1^{1}	RBR; 1; 9	RBR; 2; 21	HOC; 1; 5	HOC; 2; 2^{2}	2nd	213
2024	SSR Performance	Lamborghini Huracán GT3 Evo 2	OSC; 1; 2^{2}	**OSC**; **2**; 15^{1}	LAU; 1; 11	LAU; 2; 4	ZAN; 1; 9	ZAN; 2; 2^{2}	NOR; 1; 5^{3}	NOR; 2; 3^{2}	NÜR; 1; 2	NÜR; 2; 9	SAC; 1; 2	SAC; 2; 7	RBR; 1; 1	**RBR**; **2**; 4^{1}	HOC; 1; 5	**HOC**; **2**; 2^{1}	1st	238
2025	Abt Sportsline	Lamborghini Huracán GT3 Evo 2	OSC; 1; 9	OSC; 2; 9	LAU; 1; 13	LAU; 2; 6	ZAN; 1; 8	ZAN; 2; 9	NOR; 1; 15	NOR; 2 Ret	NÜR; 1 Ret	NÜR; 2; 14	SAC; 1; 15	SAC; 2 Ret	RBR; 1; 15	RBR; 2; 9	HOC; 1; 11	HOC; 2; 7	14th	68
2026	TGI Team by GRT	Lamborghini Temerario GT3	RBR; 1; 12	RBR; 2; 16	ZAN; 1; 14	ZAN; 2; 9	LAU; 1 Ret	LAU; 2; 5	NOR; 1; 8	NOR; 2; 11	OSC; 1; 5	OSC; 2 DSQ	NÜR; 1 Ret	NÜR; 2; 5	SAC; 1; 7	SAC; 2; 13	HOC; 1; 2	HOC; 2; 10	13th	97

^{†} As Bortolotti was a guest driver, he was ineligible to score points.

=== Complete FIA World Endurance Championship results ===
Year	Entrant	Class	Chassis	Engine	1	2	3	4	5	6	7	8	Rank	Points
2023	Prema Racing	LMP2	Oreca 07	Gibson GK428 4.2 L V8	SEB; 2	**ALG**; 4	SPA; 10	LMS; Ret	MNZ	FUJ	BHR; 5		11th	56
2024	Lamborghini Iron Lynx	Hypercar	Lamborghini SC63	Lamborghini 3.8 L Turbo V8	QAT; 13	IMO; 12	SPA; Ret	LMS; 10	SAP; 17	COA; 14	FUJ; Ret	BHR; Ret	31st	2

=== Complete 24 Hours of Le Mans results ===
Year	Team	Co-Drivers	Car	Class	Laps	Pos.	Class Pos.
2022	(Belgium) Team WRT	(Switzerland) Rolf Ineichen (Belgium) Dries Vanthoor	Oreca 07-Gibson	LMP2	366	15th	11th
2023	(Italy) Prema Racing	Daniil Kvyat (France) Doriane Pin	Oreca 07-Gibson	LMP2	113	DNF	DNF
2024	(Italy) Lamborghini Iron Lynx	Daniil Kvyat (Italy) Edoardo Mortara	Lamborghini SC63	Hypercar	309	10th	10th

Sporting positions
Preceded by Paolo Maria Nocera	Italian Formula 3 Championship; Champion; 2008	Succeeded by Daniel Zampieri
Preceded by Dean Stoneman	FIA Formula Two Championship; Champion; 2011	Succeeded by Luciano Bacheta
Preceded by Albert Costa	Eurocup Mégane Trophy; Champion; 2013	Succeeded by None (Series ended)
Preceded by Rob Bell; Côme Ledogar; Shane van Gisbergen	Blancpain GT Series Endurance Cup; Champion; 2017; With: Andrea Caldarelli & Christian Engelhart	Succeeded by Yelmer Buurman; Maro Engel; Luca Stolz
Preceded by Dominik Baumann; Maximilian Buhk	Blancpain GT Series; Champion; 2017; With: Christian Engelhart	Succeeded by Raffaele Marciello
Preceded by Thomas Preining	Deutsche Tourenwagen Masters; Champion; 2024	Succeeded by Ayhancan Güven
