= Lucidi Motors =

Auto racing team based in Italy

(Italy) Lucidi Motors
- Founded: 1991
- Team principal(s): Gabriele Lucidi
- Former series: British Formula 3 Championship; Eurocup Formula Renault 2.0; Italian Formula Three Championship
- Teams' Championships: 2007 Italian Formula Three season 2008 Italian Formula Three season
- Drivers' Championships: 2007 Italian Formula Three season (Nocera); 2008 Italian Formula Three season (Bortolotti)

Lucidi Motors is an auto racing team based in Italy.
