= Paolo Maria Nocera =

Italian former racing driver (born 1985)

- Nationality: (Italy) Italian
- Born: July 25, 1985 (age 41) Rome (Italy)

Previous series
- 2008 2008 2006 2006 2006 2004–05, 2007 2003–04 2003: GP2 Series; Formula Renault 3.5 Series; Euroseries 3000; Formula Three Euroseries; Italian Formula 3000; Italian Formula Three Championship; Formula Renault 2.0 Italia; Eurocup Formula Renault 2.0

Championship titles
- 2007: Italian Formula Three Championship

Paolo Maria Nocera (born July 25, 1985 in Rome) is an Italian former racing driver.

== Career ==
=== Formula Renault ===
Nocera began his car racing career by driving in the Italian Formula Renault Championship in 2003; also competing in one race of the Eurocup Formula Renault 2.0. For 2004 he stayed in the Italian series, but only finished twentieth in the drivers' championship in both this and the previous year.

=== Formula Three ===
Nocera first raced in the Italian Formula Three Championship in 2004. Staying with the Lucidi Motors team throughout his time in this formula, he finished thirteenth overall in his first year and improved to third place in the standings in 2005. Following an unsuccessful foray into the Formula Three Euroseries in 2006, Nocera returned to Italy for 2007 and won the F3 championship at his third attempt.

=== Formula 3000 ===
In 2006, Nocera also drove in the Euroseries 3000 for Formula One driver Giancarlo Fisichella's team. He finished thirteenth in the drivers' championship.

=== GP2 Series ===
Nocera was recruited by the BCN Competicion team to drive for them in the 2008 GP2 Series season. However, he was released after one round of the championship in favour of Adrián Vallés, who had himself been replaced at Fisichella's GP2 team by Adam Carroll.

=== Formula Renault 3.5 Series ===
It was announced on August 25, 2008, that Nocera had signed for RC Motorsport in the Formula Renault 3.5 Series, replacing British driver Duncan Tappy who had encountered budget problems. After a further two rounds of the championship, Tappy returned to the seat, and Nocera has not raced since.

== Racing record ==
=== Career summary ===
Season	Series	Team name	Races	Poles	Wins	Points	Final Placing
2003	Formula Renault 2.0 Italia	Imola Racing	12	0	0	10	20th
2003	Formula Renault 2.0 Italia	Cram Competition	12	0	0	10	20th
2003	Eurocup Formula Renault 2.0	Imola Racing	1	0	0	0	NC
2004	Italian Formula Three	Lucidi Motors	7	1	0	28	13th
2004	Formula Renault 2.0 Italia	RP Motorsport	11	0	0	8	20th
2005	Italian Formula Three	Lucidi Motors	12	5	3	168	3rd
2006	Euroseries 3000	Fisichella Motor Sport	12	5	3	13th	13th
2006	Formula Three Euroseries	Prema Powerteam	8	0	0	0	NC
2006	Masters of Formula Three	Prema Powerteam	1	0	0	N/A	29th
2007	Italian Formula Three	Lucidi Motors	16	5	6	114	1st
2008	GP2 Series	BCN Competición	2	0	0	0	34th
2008	Formula Renault 3.5 Series	RC Motorsport	4	0	0	0	32nd

=== Complete GP2 Series results ===
(key) (Races in bold indicate pole position) (Races in italics indicate fastest lap)

Year	Entrant	1	2	3	4	5	6	7	8	9	10	11	12	13	14	15	16	17	18	19	20	DC	Points
2008	BCN Competición	ESP; FEA; 17	ESP; SPR; Ret	TUR; FEA	TUR; SPR	MON; FEA	MON; SPR	FRA; FEA	FRA; SPR	GBR; FEA	GBR; SPR	GER; FEA	GER; SPR	HUN; FEA	HUN; SPR	EUR; FEA	EUR; SPR	BEL; FEA	BEL; SPR	ITA; FEA	ITA; SPR	34th	0

=== Complete Formula Renault 3.5 Series results ===
(key) (Races in bold indicate pole position) (Races in italics indicate fastest lap)

Year	Team	1	2	3	4	5	6	7	8	9	10	11	12	13	14	15	16	17	Pos	Points
2008	RC Motorsport	MNZ; 1	MNZ; 2	SPA; 1	SPA; 2	MON; 1	SIL; 1	SIL; 2	HUN; 1	HUN; 2	NÜR; 1 Ret	NÜR; 2; 14	LMS; 1 Ret	LMS; 2; 21	EST; 1	EST; 2	CAT; 1	CAT; 2	32nd	0

Sporting positions
Preceded by Mauro Massironi	Italian Formula Three Champion; 2007	Succeeded by Mirko Bortolotti
