= New Zealand Formula First Championship =

- Category: Open Wheel Racing
- Country: New Zealand
- Inaugural season: 1967
- Drivers: 22 (2019)
- Constructors: Volkswagen
- Engine suppliers: VW 1200 (80 hp approx.)
- Tyre suppliers: Maxxis MA-P3
- Drivers' champion: (New Zealand) Chris Symon

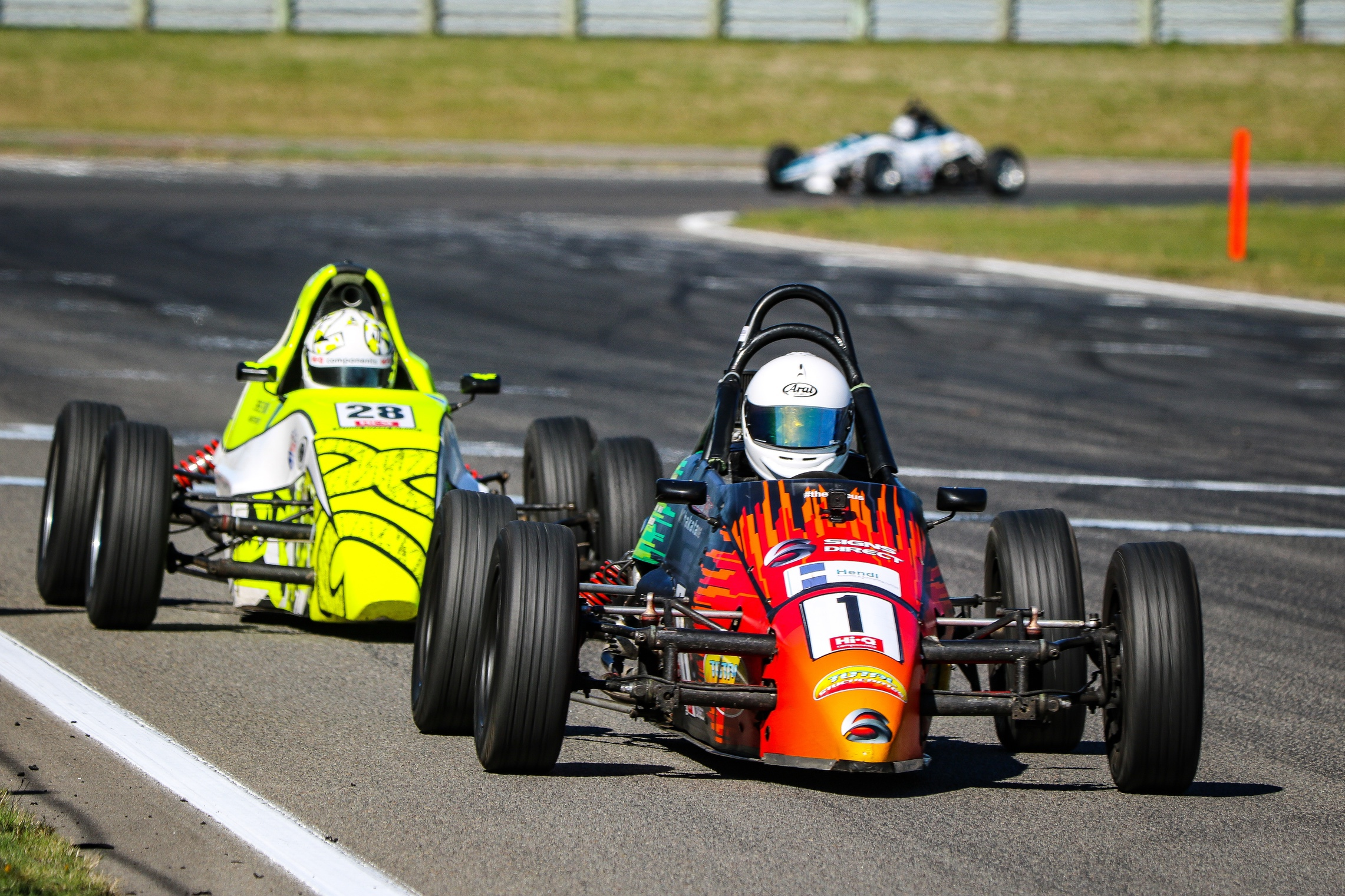
2-time Champion Reece Hendl-Cox

The New Zealand Formula First Championship is an open-wheel racing championship that runs on Volkswagen engines and bodies. The introduction of the Formula Vee concept to New Zealand can be attributed to Barry Munro, an Officer in the New Zealand Army who constructed the country's inaugural Formula Vee. Commencing chassis design in 1966, Munro finalised the first mock-up by November of that year, with the vehicle being fully assembled by March 1967.

Notably, adherence to regulatory standards of the time required all racing cars to be registered, with the Munro Vee obtaining its initial registration on February 10, 1967. Munro's design prioritised affordability within the constraints of available technology. Notably, the nose cone was fashioned from a wool coat shaped over metal ribs and set with resin.

Throughout the 1967 season, Munro actively competed with the car, participating in various classes to bolster its visibility and generate interest in Formula Vee racing. Subsequently, Digby Taylor followed suit in constructing his own Formula Vee, leading to the organisation of the inaugural All-Formula Vee race.

Over the course of its 50-year history in New Zealand, Formula Vee has established itself as a prominent platform for driver development and compelling competition. Noteworthy alumni include Formula 1 and IndyCar drivers, as well as touring car champions. The New Zealand Formula First Championship has attracted a host of distinguished competitors throughout its existence, including renowned figures such as Scott Dixon, Brendon Hartley, Liam Lawson, Shane van Gisbergen, Mitch Evans, and Richie Stanaway.

== History ==
On November 25, 1967, the inaugural Formula Vee race in New Zealand saw approximately six cars assemble at Levin, marking a significant milestone in the sport's history. Among the participants were notable figures such as Barry Munro, George Hetterscheid, Roy King, Digby Taylor, John Macey, Ivan Berry, Brian Yates, and Phil Deer, forming the grid for the inaugural race at Bay Park. The class swiftly gained traction, earning inclusion in prestigious events like the 'Rothmans National' meeting at Pukekohe.

Formula Vee continued to be used in motorsport while retaining core elements of its original regulations, including 1,200 cc (73 cu in) Volkswagen engine. Although the cars were developed over time, the category remained comparatively simple and low-cost. At the start of the 1998-99 season, the class was renamed Formula First to reflect its position as an entry level category within the motorsport development pathway.

=== Formula First TV ===
Formula First TV, initially known as NZ Formula First on their YouTube channel, emerged as a platform for showcasing Formula First content, with Jordie Peters handling various production duties, including interviewing, filming, and editing race footage. The inaugural episode debuted on YouTube on October 24, 2015. Over a year and a half later, the first episode of Formula First TV premiered on May 6, 2017, featuring presenters Jonathan Morton and Sheridan Bonner. Both presenters continue in their roles, supplemented occasionally by guest presenters such as Callum Crawley and Conrad Clark.

== Success stories ==
The New Zealand Formula First Championship is noted for its successful alumni. The class has been known for kick-starting professional careers, allowing competitors to learn the essentials of racing.

Scott Dixon became NZ's first 'junior driver', entering the championship at 12 years of age and winning the National Championship in his rookie season. Formula One driver, WEC Champion and Le Mans 24 hour winner Brendon Hartley was another driver who started their racing with Formula First in their early teens. Open wheeler Mitch Evans is another of those success stories the class has seen over the years.

The SpeedSport Scholarship, originally a partnership between Grant McDonald's SpeedSport magazine and Dennis Martin's Sabre Motorsport team has seen many of NZ's recent stars kick-start their careers in Formula First. The majority of the scholarships recipients have gone on to win championships and have produced some of the most recognisable names in Motorsport including 2016 Supercars champ Shane van Gisbergen, 3x NZGP winner and SuperGT champ Nick Cassidy as well as GP2 race winner and ADAC Formula 3 champ Richie Stanaway along with Formula One rookie Liam Lawson.

=== Current drivers' championship ===
Pos.	Driver	MAN			PUK			HMP			MAN			MAN			HMP			TAU			TAU			Points
1	(New Zealand) Reece Hendl-Cox	4	4	3	3	4	1	1	1	1	1	2	1	3	2	16	1	1	1	1	1	2	1	1	1	1613
2	(New Zealand) Chris Symon	1	1	1	1	3	Ret	2	2	2	6	7	5	5	5	1	2	2	2	3	6	11	4	2	2	1394
3	(New Zealand) Billy Frazer	3	2	4	13	7	2	5	3	5	3	1	4	2	4	4	6	3	4	7	2	4	2	3	3	1347
4	(New Zealand) Liam Foster	2	3	2	5	15	5	4	5	4	4	3	3	4	3	9	3	DSQ	3	2	3	3	3	Ret	4	1212
5	(New Zealand) Amy Smith	7	5	7	4	5	4	3	6	6	7	5	7	7	8	8	4	4	5	10	9	9	6	5	6	1100
6	(New Zealand) Ronan Murphy	6	7	6	7	8	11	8	7=	8	8	6	6	8	8	7	5	5	6	6	7	6	9	9	8	999.5
7	(New Zealand) Thomas Boniface	5	Ret	Ret	10	1	3	6	4	3	5	9	8	7	7	2	Ret	Ret	11	5	4	5	5	4	5	985
8	(New Zealand) Ron Carter	10	6	11	6	6	13	10	10	9	9	8	10	9	9	6	7	8	8	9	10	10	7	6	10	893
9	(New Zealand) Nathan Sudiono	12	9	8	15	13	8	11	12	14	15	10	12	14	12	10	9	12	10	8	11	7	8	8	9	740
10	(New Zealand) Brody McConkey	DNP	DNP	DNP	2	2	Ret	DNP	DNP	DNP	2	4	2	1	1	3	DNP	DNP	DNP	4	5	1	DNP	DNP	DNP	710
11	(New Zealand) Bob Dillow	DNP	DNP	DNP	9	11	7	9	9	10	DNP	DNP	DNP	10	13	14	8	7	7	11	12	12	16	11	11	585
12	(New Zealand) Kyan Davie	11	12	9	Ret	10	6	Ret	14	13	11	14	DNS	DNS	10	5	Ret	6	9	Ret	8	8	DNP	DNP	DNP	513
13	(New Zealand) Rob Baker	17	16	15	Ret	18	16	13	15	15	17	16	17	15	15	17	12	11	13	19	18	20	17	16	17	462
14	(New Zealand) Flynn Mullany	18	Ret	16	Ret	DNS	DNS	12	11	11	13	Ret	15	13	14	12	10	9	Ret	15	Ret	17	13	13	16	433
15	(New Zealand) Louis Redshaw	16	10	14	Ret	12	10	DNP	DNP	DNP	12	12	9	11	11	13	DNP	DNP	DNP	DNP	DNP	DNP	10	7	14	417
16	(New Zealand) Dave Scammell	13	15	12	8	14	12	Ret	13	12	DNP	DNP	DNP	12	Ret	11	DNP	DNP	DNP	13	14	18	DNP	DNP	DNP	345
17	(New Zealand) Liam Nicholson	DNP	DNP	DNP	11	15	15	DNP	DNP	DNP	16	15	Ret	DNP	DNP	DNP	11	10	12	17	15	16	15	14	15	329
18	(New Zealand) Taylor Hurst	8	14	5	14	DNS	DNS	7	7=	7	Ret	Ret	14	DNP	DNP	DNP	DNP	DNP	DNP	DNP	DNP	DNP	DNP	DNP	DNP	284.5
19	(New Zealand) Andrew Tierney	14	13	13	12	16	14	DNP	DNP	DNP	16	13	16	DNP	DNP	DNP	DNP	DNP	DNP	14	Ret	Ret	DNP	DNP	DNP	238
20	(New Zealand) Darren Henderson	15	11	10	DNP	DNP	DNP	DNP	DNP	DNP	14	Ret	13	Ret	Ret	15	DNP	DNP	DNP	16	13	13	DNP	DNP	DNP	229
21	(New Zealand) Graig Greenwood	DNP	DNP	DNP	DNP	DNP	DNP	DNP	DNP	DNP	10	11	DNP	DNP	DNP	DNP	DNP	DNP	DNP	12	Ret	14	14	15	12	219
22	(New Zealand) Travis Day	9	8	17	DNP	DNP	DNP	DNP	DNP	DNP	DNP	DNP	DNP	DNP	DNP	DNP	DNP	DNP	DNP	DNP	DNP	DNP	12	12	7	191
23	(New Zealand) Ian Foster	DNP	DNP	DNP	DNP	DNP	DNP	DNP	DNP	DNP	DNP	DNP	DNP	DNP	DNP	DNP	DNP	DNP	DNP	DNP	DNP	DNP	11	10	13	89
24	(New Zealand) Barry Holden	DNP	DNP	DNP	Ret	9	9	DNP	DNP	DNP	DNP	DNP	DNP	DNP	DNP	DNP	DNP	DNP	DNP	DNP	DNP	DNP	DNP	DNP	DNP	72
25	(New Zealand) Shaun Logan	DNP	DNP	DNP	DNP	DNP	DNP	DNP	DNP	DNP	DNP	DNP	DNP	DNP	DNP	DNP	DNP	DNP	DNP	16	16	15	DNP	DNP	DNP	60
26	(New Zealand) Jarad Nicholson	DNP	DNP	DNP	DNP	DNP	DNP	DNP	DNP	DNP	DNP	DNP	DNP	DNP	DNP	DNP	DNP	DNP	DNP	18	17	19	DNP	DNP	DNP	54
Pos.	Driver	MAN			PUK			HMP			MAN			MAN			HMP			TAU			TAU			Points

Colour	Result
Gold	Winner
Silver	Second place
Bronze	Third place
Green	Points classification
Blue	Non-points classification
Blue	Non-classified finish (NC)
Purple	Retired, not classified (Ret)
Red	Did not qualify (DNQ)
Red	Did not pre-qualify (DNPQ)
Black	Disqualified (DSQ)
White	Did not start (DNS)
White	Withdrew (WD)
White	Race cancelled (C)
Blank	Did not practice (DNP)
Blank	Did not arrive (DNA)
Blank	Excluded (EX)

**Bold** – Pole
Italics – Fastest Lap

Rookie

== Past champions ==
Season	Champion
1967–68	was not a national championship
1968–69	was not a national championship
1969–70	was not a national championship
1970–71	was not a national championship
1971–72	was not a national championship
1972–73	was not a national championship
1973–74	was not a national championship
1974–75	(New Zealand) Norm Lankshear
1975–76	(New Zealand) Ian Hodge
1976–77	(New Zealand) Donald Halliday
1977–79	(New Zealand) Mick Scott
1978–79	(New Zealand) Robert Lester MNZM
1979–80	(New Zealand) Steve Cameron
1980–81	(New Zealand) Roger Coles
1981–82	(New Zealand) Chris Abbott
1982–83	(New Zealand) Roger Coles
1983–84	(New Zealand) Roger Coles
1984–85	(New Zealand) Robert Lester MNZM
1985–86	(New Zealand) Ross Symon
1986–87	(New Zealand) Ross Symon
1987–88	(New Zealand) Ross Symon
1988–89	(New Zealand) Ross Symon
1989–90	(New Zealand) Tim Natusch
1990–91	(New Zealand) Chris Maxwell
1991–92	(New Zealand) Dennis Martin
1992–93	(New Zealand) Dom Kalasih
1993–94	(New Zealand) Scott Dixon
1994–95	(New Zealand) Robert Lester MNZM
1995–96	(New Zealand) Dennis Martin
1996–97	(New Zealand) Craig Greenwood
1997–98	(New Zealand) Mike Rohloff
1998–99	(New Zealand) Nick Luxford
1999–2000	(New Zealand) David Payne
2000–01	(New Zealand) Michael Shepherd
2001–02	(New Zealand) Michael Shepherd
2002–03	(New Zealand) Paul Butler
2003–04	(New Zealand) Leo Francis
2004–05	(New Zealand) Mark Russ
2005–06	(New Zealand) Michael Shepherd
2006–07	(New Zealand) Selby Allison
2007–08	(New Zealand) Cliff Field
2008–09	(New Zealand) Ian Foster
2009–10	(New Zealand) Michael Shepherd
2010–11	(New Zealand) Michael Shepherd
2011–12	(New Zealand) Matt Higham
2012–13	(New Zealand) Rowan Shepherd
2013–14	(New Zealand) Rowan Shepherd
2014–15	(New Zealand) Michael Shepherd
2015–16	(New Zealand) Michael Shepherd
2016–17	(New Zealand) Bramwell King
2017–18	(New Zealand) Callum Crawley
2018-19	(New Zealand) Reece Hendl-Cox
2019-20	(New Zealand) Reece Hendl-Cox
2020-21	(New Zealand) Chris Symon
2021-22	(New Zealand) Chris Symon
2022-23	(New Zealand) Chris Symon
2023-24	(New Zealand) Chris Symon
2024-25	(New Zealand) Chris Symon
2025-26	(New Zealand) Chris Symon

== Records ==
Most Titles
Rank	Driver	Titles
1	(New Zealand) Michael Shepherd	7
2	(New Zealand) Chris Symon	6
3	(New Zealand) Ross Symon	4
4	(New Zealand) Robert Lester, MNZM	3
4	(New Zealand) Roger Coles	3
5	(New Zealand) Rowan Shepherd	2
5	(New Zealand) Dennis Martin	2
5	(New Zealand) Reece Hendl-Cox	2
6	(New Zealand) Callum Crawley	1
6	(New Zealand) Bramwell King	1
6	(New Zealand) Matt Higham	1
6	(New Zealand) Ian Foster	1
6	(New Zealand) Cliff Field	1
6	(New Zealand) Selby Allison	1
6	(New Zealand) Mark Russ	1
6	(New Zealand) Leo Francis	1
6	(New Zealand) Paul Butler	1
6	(New Zealand) David Payne	1
6	(New Zealand) Nick Luxford	1
6	(New Zealand) Mike Rohloff	1
6	(New Zealand) Craig Greenwood	1
6	(New Zealand) Dom Kalasih	1
6	(New Zealand) Scott Dixon	1
6	(New Zealand) Chris Maxwell	1
6	(New Zealand) Tim Natusch	1
6	(New Zealand) Mike King	1
6	(New Zealand) Donald Halliday	1
6	(New Zealand) Ian Hodge	1
6	(New Zealand) Norm Lankshear	1
