= Tommy Smith (racing driver) =

Australian racing driver

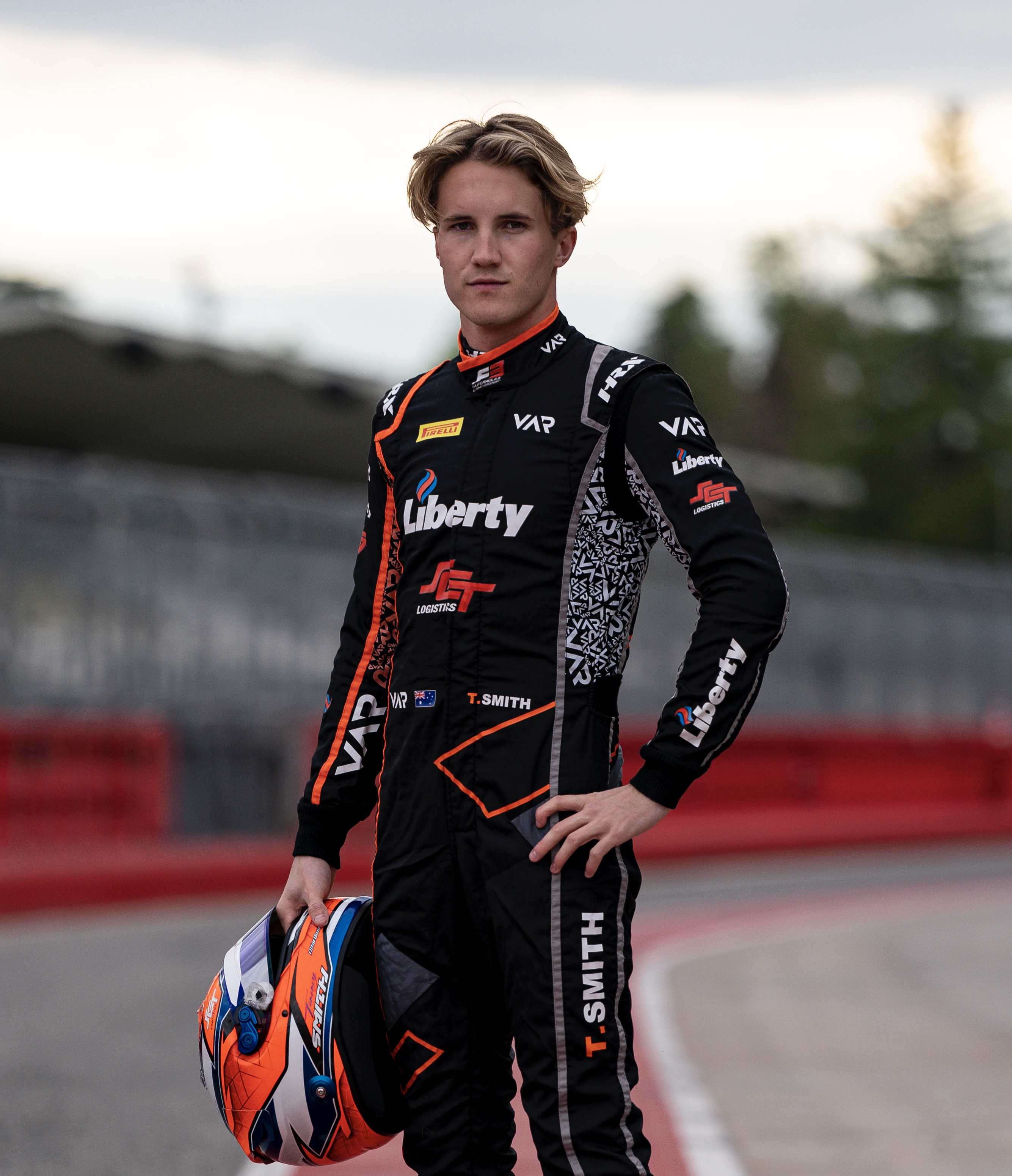
- Smith in 2023
- Nationality: (Australia) Australian
- Born: 6 June 2002 (age 24) Melbourne, Victoria, Australia
- Relatives: Jack Smith (uncle)

Indy NXT career
- Debut season: 2025
- Current team: HMD Motorsports
- Car number: 16
- Starts: 13 (13 entries)
- Wins: 0
- Podiums: 0
- Poles: 0
- Fastest laps: 0
- Best finish: TBD in 2025

Previous series
- 2024–2025 2023–2024 2022 2021–2022 2021 2021 2019-2019/20 2019 2017-18 2017-18: FR Oceania Championship; FIA Formula 3 Championship; Australian Formula 3 Championship; GB3 Championship; FR European Championship; S5000 Australia; F3 Asian Championship; Toyota Racing Series; Formula Ford NZ South Island; NZ Formula 1600 Championship

Thomas Smith (born 6 June 2002) is an Australian racing driver who currently competes in the Super2 Series for Matt Stone Racing. He previously competed in the 2025 Indy NXT with HMD Motorsports. He previously competed in the FIA Formula 3 Championship in 2023 and 2024 with Van Amersfoort Racing. Prior, he raced with Douglas Motorsport in the 2022 GB3 Championship, having won one race & scoring two podium finishes.

== Career ==
=== New Zealand Formula Ford ===
The first single-seater series in which Smith competed was the 2017–18 New Zealand Formula Ford Championship. He had a best finish of third place at Teretonga Park.

=== F3 Asian Championship ===
Smith's first year in the F3 Asian Championship was in 2019. Driving for Pinnacle Motorsport, he had a best finish of eighth place at the final race in Shanghai. This, along with five more points-scoring results, put him twelfth in the championship. For the 2019–20 season, Smith joined Absolute Racing, teaming up with the inaugural W Series champion Jamie Chadwick and FIA F3 driver Devlin DeFrancesco. Smith ended the season in tenth place with 48 points, 218 points behind champion Joey Alders. His highest-scoring round came at the Chang International Circuit, where he placed sixth in Races 1 and 3 and ninth in Race 2.

=== Formula Renault Eurocup ===
In 2020, it was announced that Smith would race in Formula Renault Eurocup for the Italian team JD Motorsport alongside Finnish driver William Alatalo. However, due to the impact of COVID-19, Smith was not able to compete.

=== Formula Regional European Championship ===
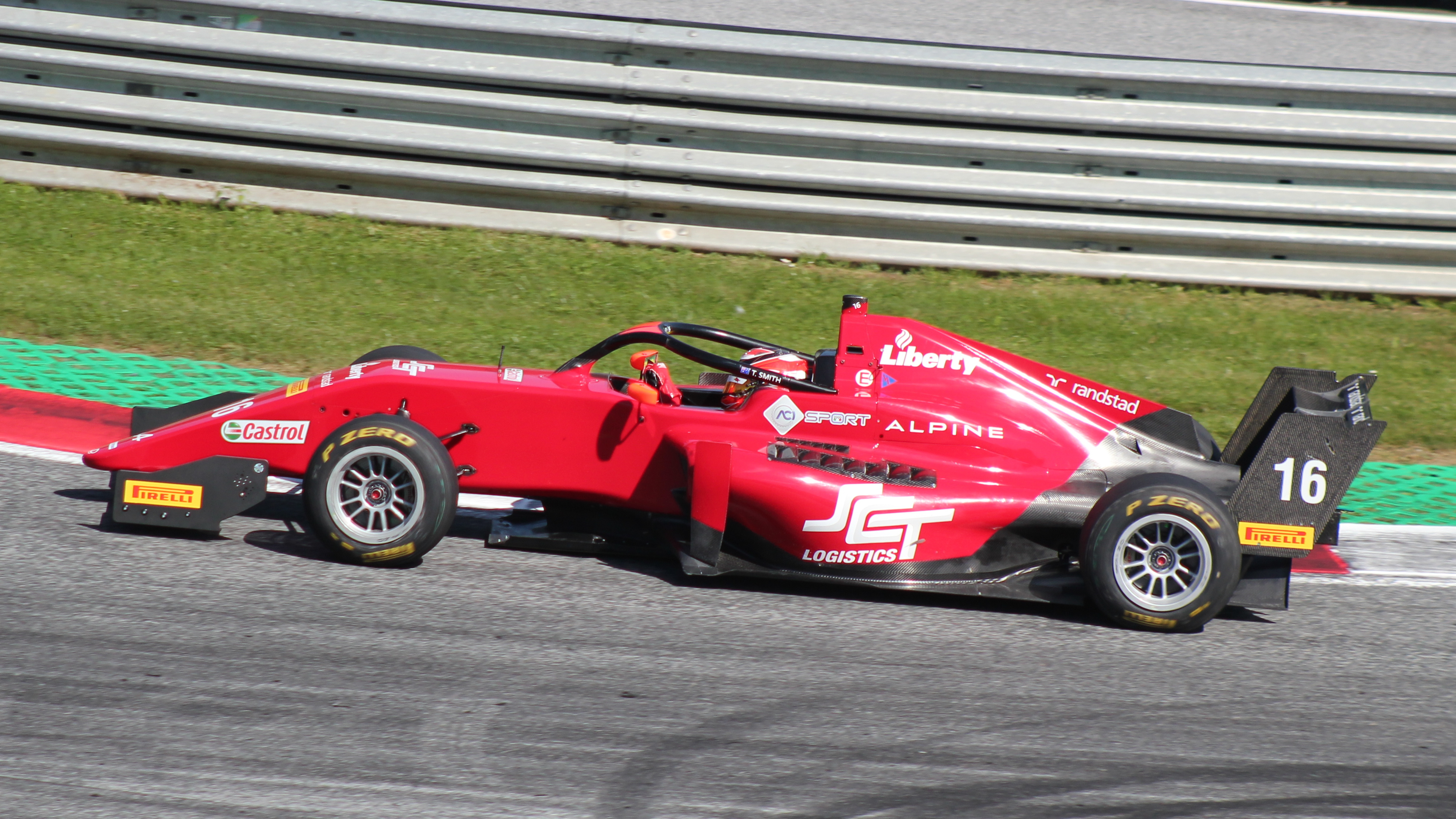
Smith at the Red Bull Ring in 2021.

In 2021, Smith contested the newly formed Formula Regional European Championship with JD Motorsport alongside Eduardo Barrichello. Both Smith and Barrichello failed to amass points throughout the twenty-race-long campaign, with Smith ending up 31st in the standings. Of note, a multi-car incident on the first lap of Race 2 at Monaco resulted in Smith flipping the car of Nicola Marinangeli.

=== GB3 Championship ===
==== 2021 ====
During the second half of 2021, Smith moved into the GB3 Championship, which he would contest with Douglas Motorsport. In the three rounds he contested, he scored a best finish of twelfth, at Snetterton and Silverstone respectively, which meant a 22nd place in the drivers' standings.

==== 2022 ====
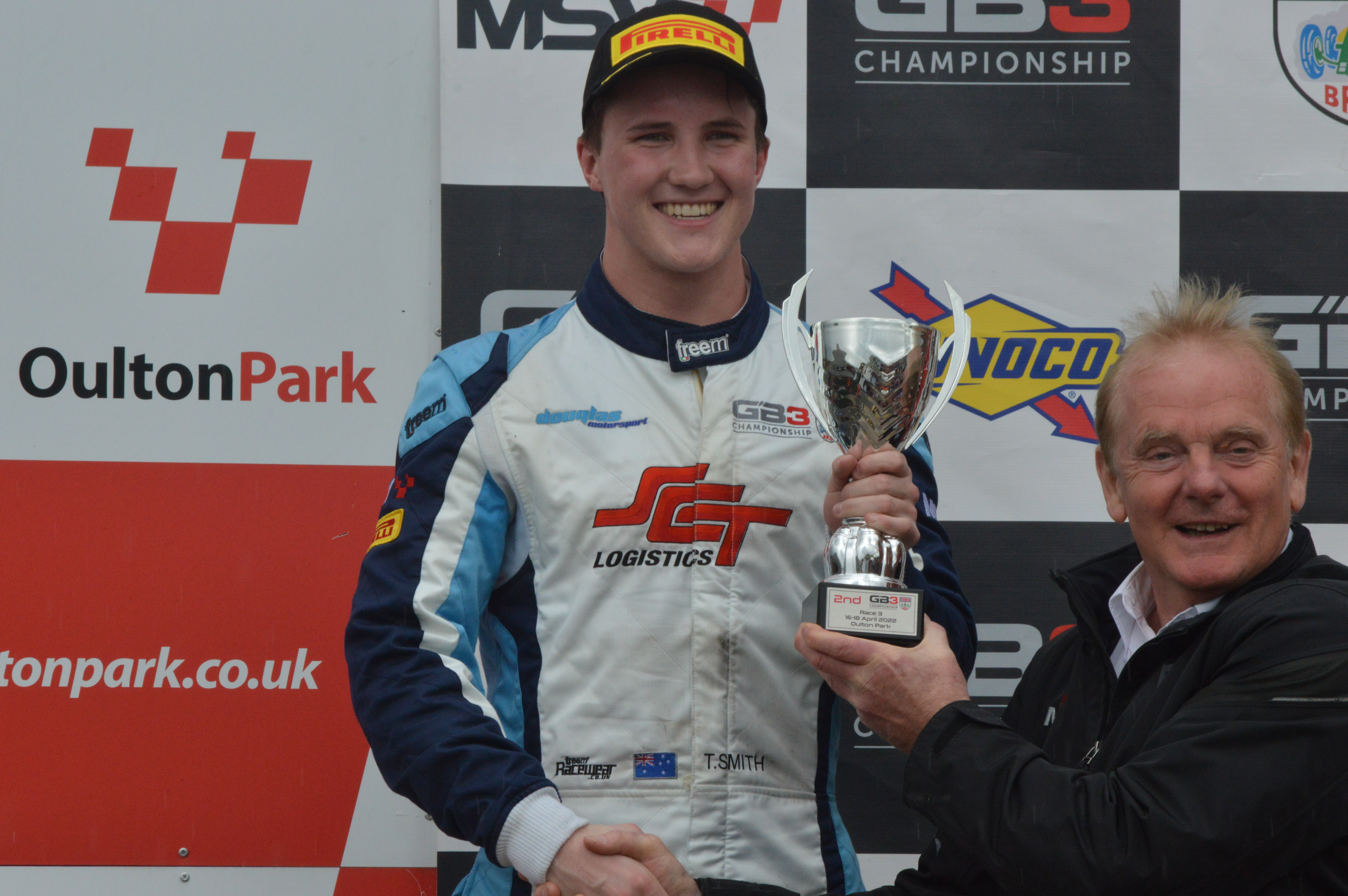
Smith presented with a trophy in 2022 by Jonathan Palmer

Smith remained in the category for the 2022 season, once again driving for Douglas Motorsport alongside Max Esterson and Marcos Flack. At the first round of the campaign, held at Oulton, Smith took a second place in the reversed-grid Race 3, having defended against David Morales throughout the final laps.

Following three rounds that yielded two top-five results, Smith found himself finishing second again at Spa-Francorchamps, which, following the application of a red flag rule, which reinstated the results from the lap before the Race 3 had been abandoned, meant that the Australian was awarded with the victory. This would end up being the pinnacle of Smith's season, with him scoring only one top-ten finish in the final three events.

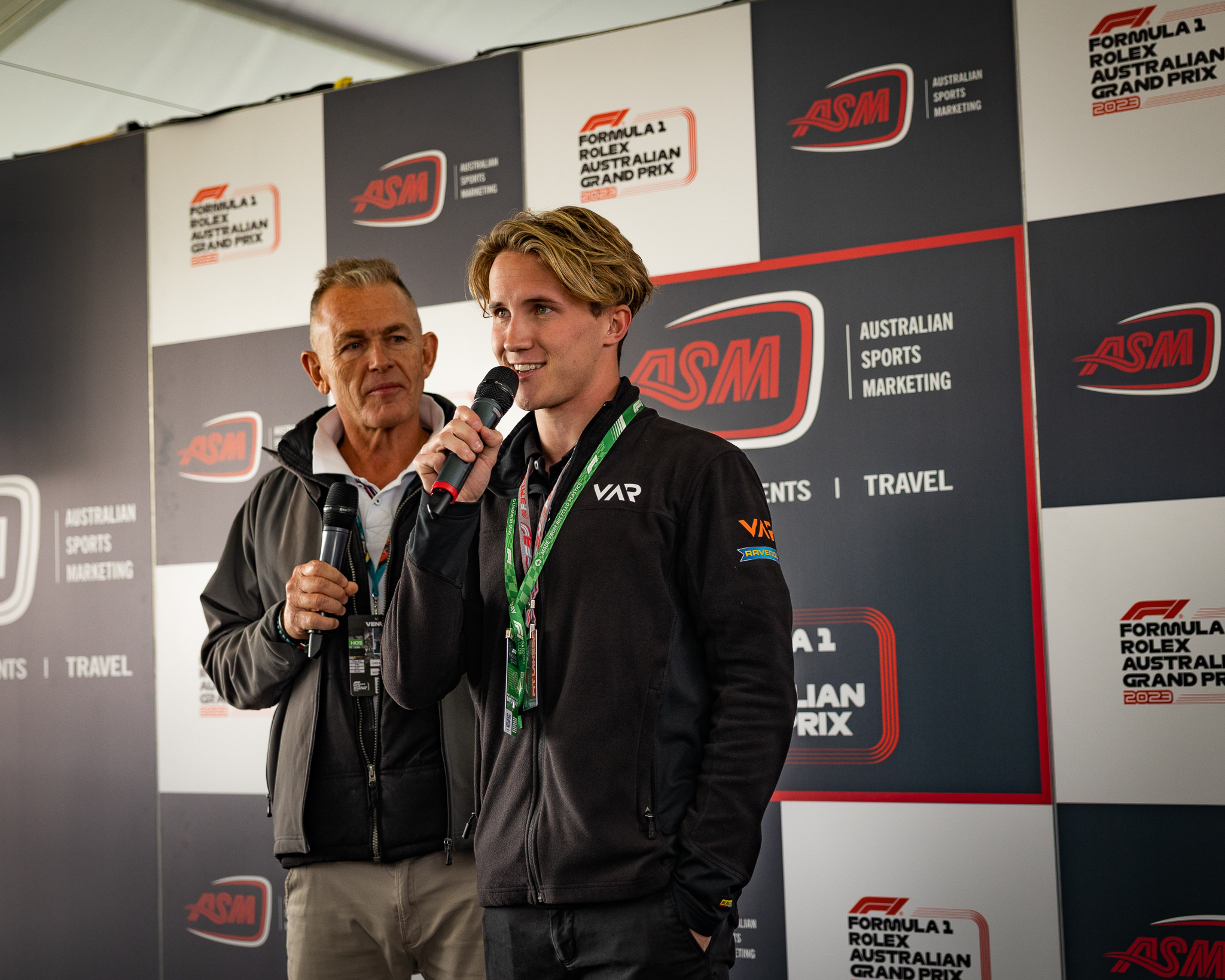
Tommy speaking at the 2023 Australian Grand Prix

=== FIA Formula 3 ===
==== 2023 ====
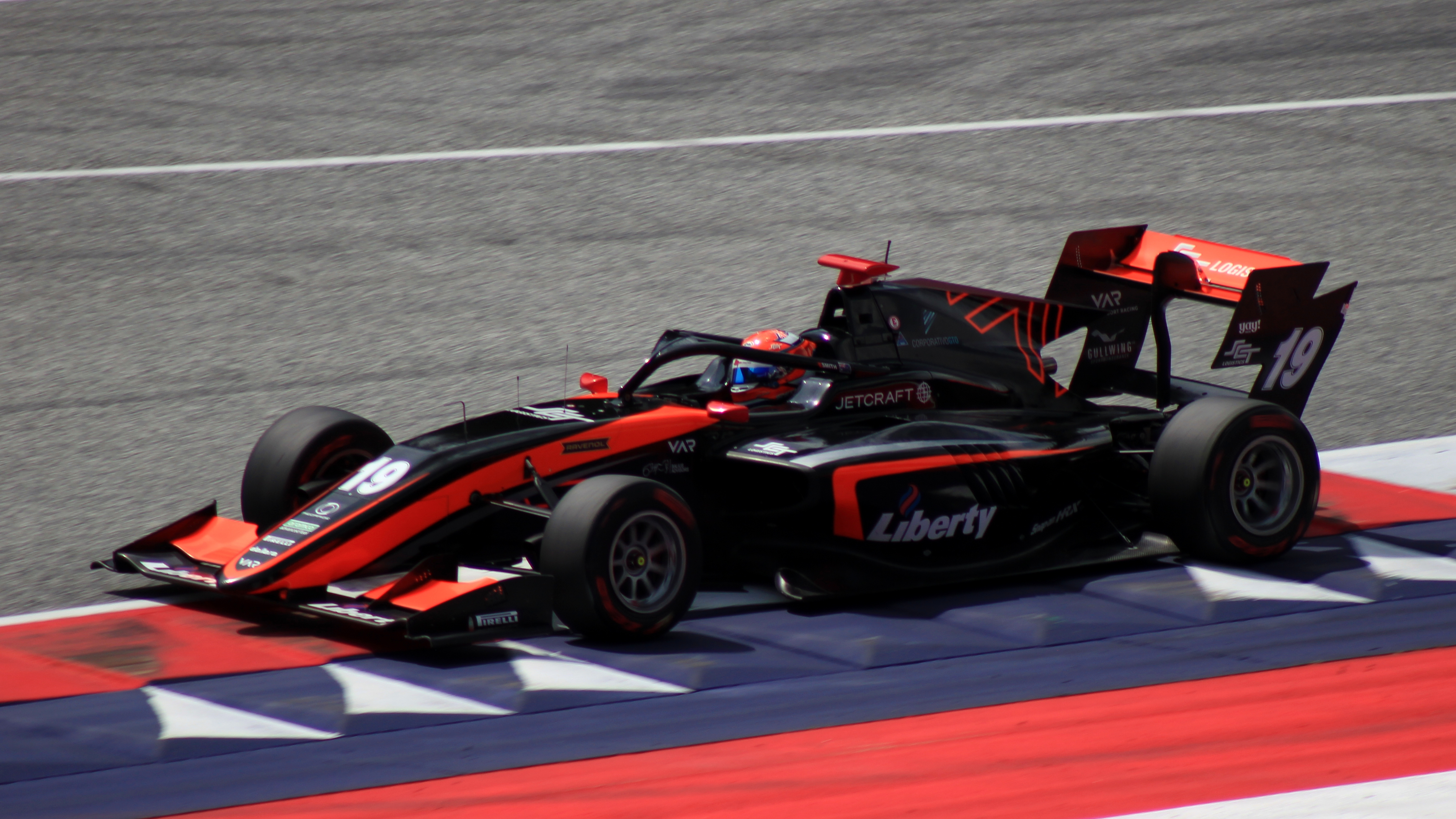
Smith driving the Dallara F3 2019 during the 2023 Spielberg Formula 3 round

For 2023, Smith moved to the FIA Formula 3 Championship, driving for Van Amersfoort Racing. He finished 27th in the standings with no points, having a best finish of twelfth in the Feature race at Melbourne, starting from 27th.

==== 2024 ====
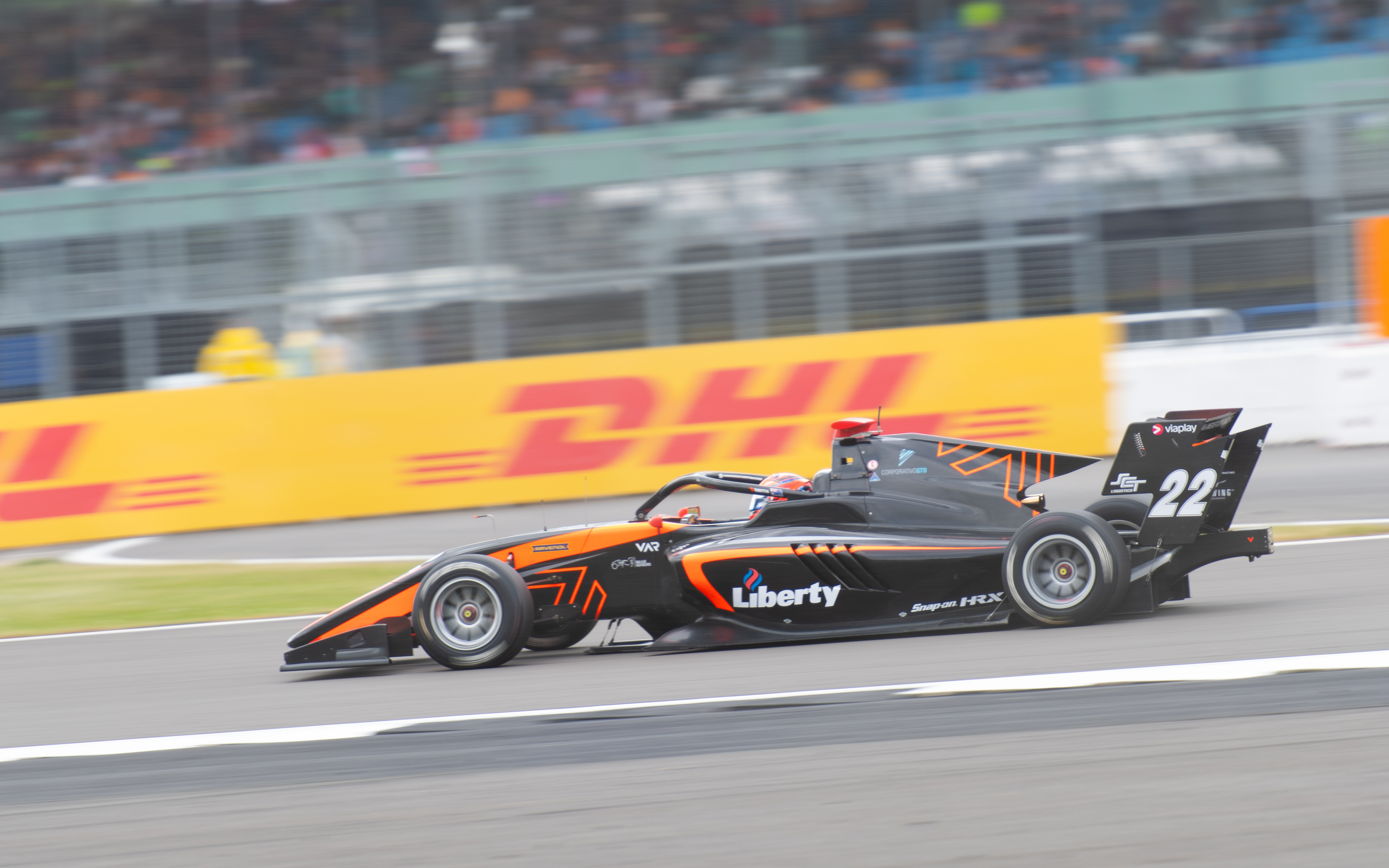
Smith driving for Van Amersfoort Racing during the 2024 Silverstone Formula 3 round.

Smith remained at Van Amersfoort for the 2024 season. During the season, Smith regularly qualified outside of the top-twenty, with the only exception coming at Monaco where he qualified nineteenth. He also got involved in several incidents during the year, including a collision with Matías Zagazeta in the Sakhir sprint race, outbraking himself and spinning Tasanapol Inthraphuvasak at Melbourne, and spinning around Mari Boya at Imola. However, Smith also scored his first points in the category during the Silverstone feature race, correctly switching to dry tyres on a wet but drying track to rise to fourth once his competitors pitted for dry tyres during the race.

=== Formula Regional Oceania Championship ===
==== 2024 ====
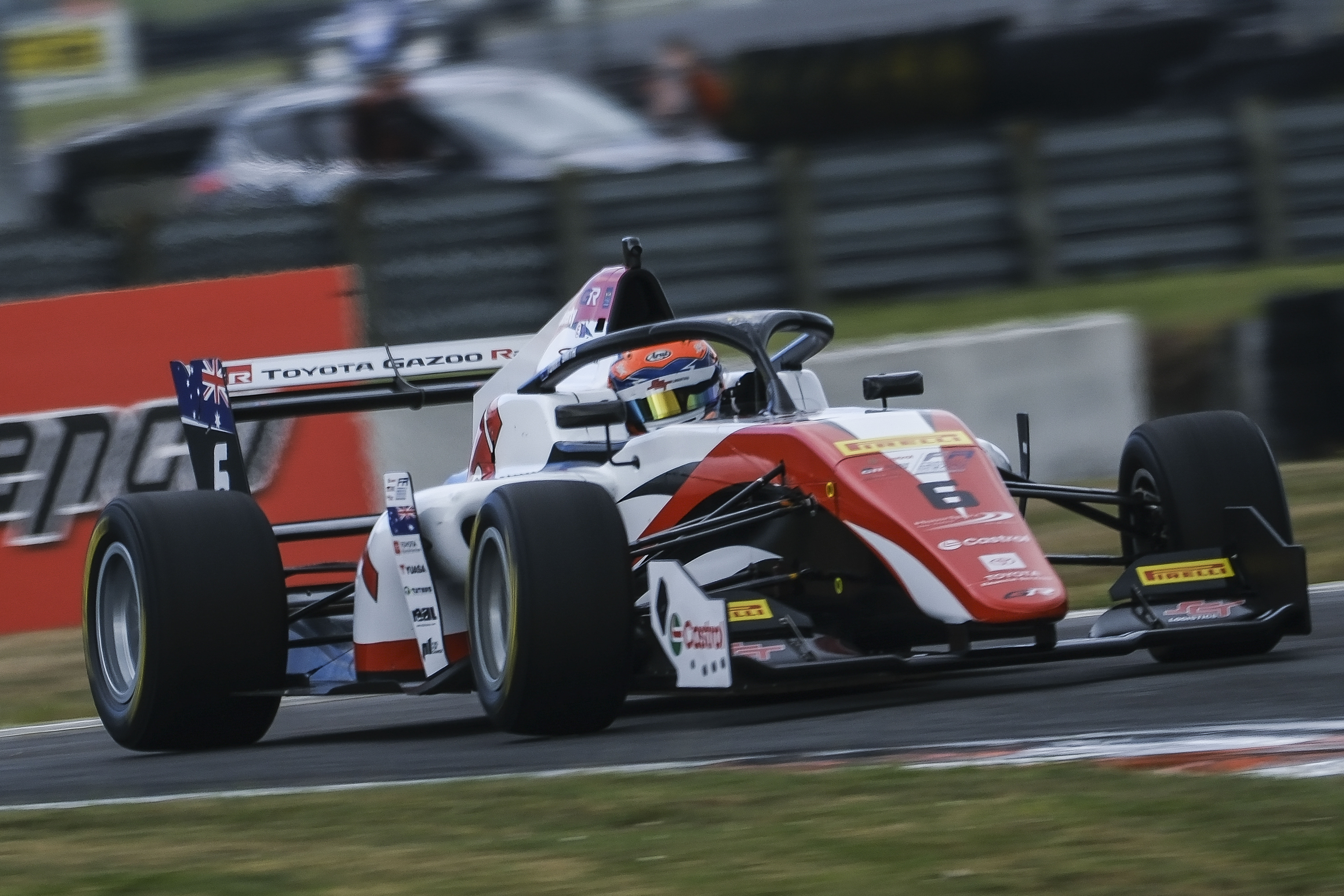
Smith at the Taupo International Motorsport Park in 2024

Smith competed in three of the five Rounds in the 2024 Formula Regional Oceania Championship with MTEC Motorsports in preparation of his 2024 racing season. He scored two podiums, finishing eighth overall having missed six races, gaining two FIA Super Licence Points.

==== 2025 ====
Smith returned to the Formula Regional Oceania Championship, competing in the first two rounds for Giles Motorsport.

=== Indy NXT ===
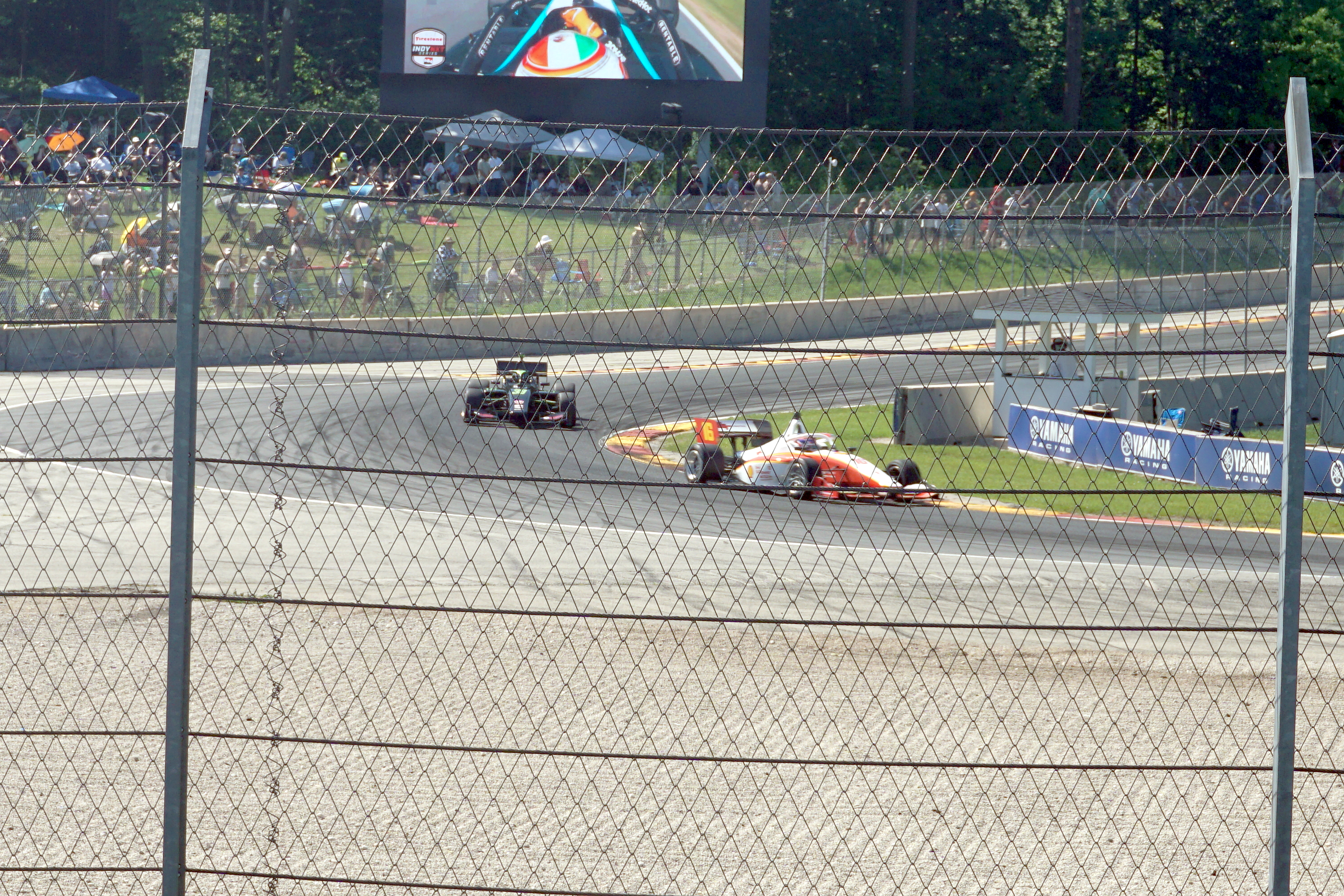
Smith (front) being chased by Hailie Deegan at Road America in 2025.

For 2025, Smith switched to Indy NXT with HMD Motorsports after spending two seasons in FIA Formula 3.

== Personal life ==
Smith is the grandson of Peter Smith, founder of the Specialized Container Transport (SCT) Group. His father, Geoff Smith, is Peter's eldest son and currently the Managing Director of SCT Logistics.

Smith's uncle Jack is also a racing driver, who formerly competed in the Supercars Championship with Brad Jones Racing.

== Racing record ==
=== Racing career summary ===
Season	Series	Team	Races	Wins	Poles	F/laps	Podiums	Points	Position
2017–18	Formula Ford New Zealand South Island Series	N/A	3	0	0	0	0	109	N/A
2017–18	NZ Formula 1600 Championship	N/A	7	0	0	0	1	109	N/A
2018	Australian Formula 4 Championship	Team BRM	21	0	0	1	0	99	8th
2019	Australian Formula 4 Championship	Team BRM	12	0	0	0	0	106	7th
2019	Toyota Racing Series	Giles Motorsport	14	0	0	0	0	101	14th
2019	F3 Asian Championship	Pinnacle Motorsport	15	0	0	0	0	11	16th
2019–20	F3 Asian Championship	Absolute Racing	15	0	0	0	0	48	10th
2021	Formula Regional European Championship	JD Motorsport	19	0	0	0	0	0	31st
2021	Australian S5000 Championship	Team BRM	1	0	0	0	0	18	12th
2021	GB3 Championship	Douglas Motorsport	9	0	0	0	0	41	22nd
2022	GB3 Championship	Douglas Motorsport	24	1	0	0	2	136.5	19th
2023	FIA Formula 3 Championship	Van Amersfoort Racing	18	0	0	0	0	0	28th
2023	Macau Grand Prix	Van Amersfoort Racing	1	0	0	0	0	N/A	14th
2024	Formula Regional Oceania Championship	mtec Motorsport	9	0	0	2	2	144	8th
2024	FIA Formula 3 Championship	Van Amersfoort Racing	20	0	0	0	0	12	20th
2025	Formula Regional Oceania Championship	Giles Motorsport	6	0	0	0	0	85	16th
2025	Indy NXT	HMD Motorsports	14	0	0	0	0	202	15th
2025	Australian National Trans Am Series	TFH Racing	9	0	0	0	0	8	?
2026	Super2 Series	Matt Stone Racing	4	0	0	0	0	219*	17th*
2026	TA2 Racing Muscle Car Series	Matt Stone Racing	8	1	0	0	3	94*	6th
2026	Australian National Trans Am Series	Matt Stone Racing	3	0	0	0	0	6*	24th*

* Season still in progress.

=== Complete Australian Formula 4 Championship results ===
(key) (Races in bold indicate pole position) (Races in italics indicate fastest lap)

Year	Team	1	2	3	4	5	6	7	8	9	10	11	12	13	14	15	16	17	18	19	20	21	DC	Points
2018	Team BRM	SYM; 1; 9	SYM; 2; 8	SYM; 3; 5	PHI; 1; 11	PHI; 2; 8	PHI; 3; 7	QLD; 1; 10	QLD; 2; 9	QLD; 3; 9	WIN1; 1; 8	WIN1; 2; 7	WIN1; 3; 7	WIN2; 1; 8	WIN2; 2; 7	WIN2; 3; 9	SYD; 1; 6	SYD; 2; 9	SYD; 3; 8	PUK; 1; 4	PUK; 2; 6	PUK; 3; 6	8th	99
2019	Team BRM	MEL; 1; 9	MEL; 2; 4	MEL; 3; 8	SYD; 1; 4	SYD; 2; 6	SYD; 3; 7	PHI1; 1	PHI1; 2	PHI1; 3	PHI2; 1	PHI2; 2	PHI2; 3	BEN1; 1; 6	BEN1; 2; 6	BEN1; 3; 4	BEN2; 1; 4	BEN2; 2; 5	BEN2; 3; 4				7th	106

=== Complete Toyota Racing Series results ===
(key) (Races in bold indicate pole position) (Races in italics indicate fastest lap)

Year	Team	1	2	3	4	5	6	7	8	9	10	11	12	13	14	15	16	17	DC	Points
2019	Giles Motorsport	HIG; 1; 15	HIG; 2; 12	HIG; 3; 12	TER; 1; 14	TER; 2 C	TER; 3 C	HMP; 1; 12	HMP; 2; 11	HMP; 3; 12	HMP; 4; 9	TAU; 1; 11	TAU; 2; 14	TAU; 3; 13	TAU; 4; 13	MAN; 1; 14	MAN; 2; 8	MAN; 3 Ret	14th	101

=== Complete F3 Asian Championship results ===
(key) (Races in bold indicate pole position) (Races in italics indicate fastest lap)

Year	Team	1	2	3	4	5	6	7	8	9	10	11	12	13	14	15	DC	Points
2019	Pinnacle Motorsport	SEP; 1; 12	SEP; 2; 13	SEP; 3; 13	CHA; 1 Ret	CHA; 2 DNS	CHA; 3; 10	SUZ; 1; 15	SUZ; 2 Ret	SUZ; 3 Ret	SIC1; 1; 9	SIC1; 2; 10	SIC1; 3; 10	SIC2; 1 Ret	SIC2; 2; 9	SIC2; 3; 8	18th	11
2019–20	Absolute Racing	SEP1; 1; 10	SEP1; 2; 11	SEP1; 3; 10	DUB; 1; 8	DUB; 2; 12	DUB; 3; 13	ABU; 1; 12	ABU; 2 Ret	ABU; 3; 8	SEP2; 1; 7	SEP2; 2; 11†	SEP2; 3; 7	CHA; 1; 6	CHA; 2; 9	CHA; 3; 6	10th	48

- † — Did not finish the race, but were classified as he completed over 75% of the race distance.

=== Complete S5000 results ===
Year	Team	1	2	3	4	5	6	7	8	9	10	11	12	DC	Points
2021	Team BRM	SYM; R1; 7	SYM; R2; Ret	SYM; R3; DNS	PHI; R4	PHI; R5	PHI; R6	SAN; R7	SAN; R8	SAN; R9	SMP; R10	SMP; R11	SMP; R12	12th	18

=== Complete Formula Regional European Championship results ===
(key) (Races in bold indicate pole position) (Races in italics indicate fastest lap)

Year	Team	1	2	3	4	5	6	7	8	9	10	11	12	13	14	15	16	17	18	19	20	DC	Points
2021	JD Motorsport	IMO; 1 Ret	IMO; 2; 21	CAT; 1; 22	CAT; 2; 25	MCO; 1 DNQ	MCO; 2 Ret	LEC; 1; 23	LEC; 2; 17	ZAN; 1 Ret	ZAN; 2; 29	SPA; 1; 22	SPA; 2 Ret	RBR; 1 Ret	RBR; 2; 26	VAL; 1; 21	VAL; 2; 21	MUG; 1; 24	MUG; 2; 27	MNZ; 1; 28	MNZ; 2; 18	31st	0

=== Complete GB3 Championship results ===
(key) (Races in bold indicate pole position) (Races in italics indicate fastest lap)

Year	Entrant	1	2	3	4	5	6	7	8	9	10	11	12	13	14	15	16	17	18	19	20	21	22	23	24	DC	Points
2021	Douglas Motorsport	BRH; 1	BRH; 2	BRH; 3	SIL1; 1	SIL1; 2	SIL1; 3	DON1; 1	DON1; 2	DON1; 3	SPA; 1	SPA; 2	SPA; 3	SNE; 1; 12	SNE; 2; 15	SNE; 3; 15	SIL2; 1; 12	SIL2; 2; 15	SIL2; 3; 14	OUL; 1	OUL; 2	OUL; 3	DON2; 1 Ret	DON2; 2; 16	DON2; 3; 18	22nd	41
2022	Douglas Motorsport	OUL; 1; 17	OUL; 2; 17	OUL; 3; 2	SIL1; 1; 14	SIL1; 2; 16	SIL1; 3; 12	DON1; 1; 13	DON1; 2; 21	DON1; 3; 5	SNE; 1 Ret	SNE; 2; 18	SNE; 3; 4^{2}	SPA; 1; 14	SPA; 2; 19	SPA; 3; 1^{1}	SIL2; 1; 21	SIL2; 2; 16	SIL2; 3; 7	BRH; 1; 13	BRH; 2; 11	BRH; 3; 17	DON2; 1; 14	DON2; 2 Ret	DON2; 3; 17	19th	136.5

=== Complete FIA Formula 3 Championship results ===
(key) (Races in bold indicate pole position) (Races in italics indicate fastest lap)

Year	Entrant	1	2	3	4	5	6	7	8	9	10	11	12	13	14	15	16	17	18	19	20	DC	Points
2023	Van Amersfoort Racing	BHR; SPR; 23	BHR; FEA; 28†	MEL; SPR; Ret	MEL; FEA; 12	MON; SPR; 21	MON; FEA; 15	CAT; SPR; 18	CAT; FEA; 23	RBR; SPR; 21	RBR; FEA; 18	SIL; SPR; 26	SIL; FEA; 25	HUN; SPR; 24	HUN; FEA; 29	SPA; SPR; 24	SPA; FEA; 18	MNZ; SPR; Ret	MNZ; FEA; 20			27th	0
2024	Van Amersfoort Racing	BHR; SPR; 28	BHR; FEA; 22	MEL; SPR; 27	MEL; FEA; Ret	IMO; SPR; 24	IMO; FEA; 27	MON; SPR; 13	MON; FEA; 12	CAT; SPR; 18	CAT; FEA; 25	RBR; SPR; 21	RBR; FEA; 22	SIL; SPR; 21	SIL; FEA; 4	HUN; SPR; 25	HUN; FEA; 24	SPA; SPR; 25	SPA; FEA; 16	MNZ; SPR; 23	MNZ; FEA; 15	20th	12

=== Complete New Zealand Grand Prix results ===
Year	Team	Car	Qualifying	Main race
2019	(New Zealand) Giles Motorsport	Tatuus FT-50 - Toyota	15th	Ret

=== Complete Macau Grand Prix results ===
Year	Team	Car	Qualifying	Quali Race	Main race
2023	(Netherlands) Van Amersfoort Racing	Dallara F3 2019	26th	23rd	14th

=== Complete Formula Regional Oceania Championship results ===
(key) (Races in bold indicate pole position) (Races in italics indicate fastest lap)

Year	Team	1	2	3	4	5	6	7	8	9	10	11	12	13	14	15	DC	Points
2024	mtec Motorsport	TAU; 1; 7	TAU; 2; 6	TAU; 3; 12	MAN; 1; 6	MAN; 2; 3	MAN; 3; 4	HMP; 1; 5	HMP; 2; 9	HMP; 3; 7	RUA; 1	RUA; 2	RUA; 3	HIG; 1	HIG; 2	HIG; 3	8th	144
2025	Giles Motorsport	TAU; 1	TAU; 2	TAU; 3	HMP; 1	HMP; 2	HMP; 3	MAN; 1; 4	MAN; 2; 6	MAN; 3; 7	TER; 1; 9	TER; 2; 11	TER; 3; 9	HIG; 1	HIG; 2	HIG; 3	16th	85

=== Complete American open–wheel racing results ===
==== Indy NXT ====
(key) (Races in bold indicate pole position) (Races in italics indicate fastest lap) (Races with ^{L} indicate a race lap led) (Races with * indicate most race laps led)

Year	Team	1	2	3	4	5	6	7	8	9	10	11	12	13	14	Rank	Points
2025	HMD Motorsports	STP; 15	BAR; 14	IMS; 13	IMS; 21	DET; 17	GMP; 17	RDA; 17	MOH; 15	IOW; 17	LAG; 13	LAG; 12	POR; 12	MIL; 18	NSH; 17	15th	202

=== Super2 Series results ===
(key) (Race results only)

Super2 Series results
Year	Team	No.	Car	1	2	3	4	5	6	7	8	9	10	11	12	Position	Points
2026	Matt Stone Racing	16	Holden Commodore ZB	SMP; R1; 20	SMP; R2; 15	HID; R3; 16	HID; R4; 16	BAR; R5	BAR; R6	BAT; R9	BAT; R10	SAN; R7	SAN; R8	ADE; R11	ADE; R12	17th*	219*

=== Australian TransAm Series results ===
Year	Car	1	2	3	4	5	6	7	8	9	10	11	12	13	14	15	16	17	18	19	20	21	Position	Points
2025	Ford Mustang	SYM; R1	SYM; R2	SYM; R3	SYM; R4	BAT; R1	BAT; R2	HID; R1	HID; R2	HID; R3	SAN; R1	SAN; R2	SAN; R3	BEN; R1; 14	BEN; R2; Ret	BEN; R3; 23	MAL; R1; Ret	MAL; R2; Ret	MAL; R3; Ret	ADE; R1; 18	ADE; R2; 14	ADE; R3; 13	35th	8
2026	Chevrolet Camaro	BAT; R1; 18	BAT; R2; 20	BAT; R3; 17	HID; R1	HID; R2	HID; R3	WAN; R1	WAN; R2	WAN; R3	QLD; R1	QLD; R2	QLD; R3	BEN; R1	BEN; R2	BEN; R3	SAN; R1	SAN; R2	SAN; R3	SAN; R4	SAN; R5	SAN; R6	24th*	6*
