= 2019 Toyota Racing Series =

Motor racing competition

The 2019 Castrol Toyota Racing Series was the fifteenth running of the Toyota Racing Series, the premier open-wheel motorsport category held in New Zealand. The series consisted of fifteen races at five meetings. It began on 10 January at Highlands Motorsport Park, in Cromwell, and concluded on 10 February with the 64th running of the New Zealand Grand Prix, at Circuit Chris Amon in Feilding.

The championship, as well as the 2019 New Zealand Grand Prix was won by rookie Liam Lawson; who became the first New Zealander to win the championship since Nick Cassidy in 2013.

Champion Liam Lawson and runner-up Marcus Armstrong both took five wins apiece, whilst Cameron Das, FIA Formula 3 European Championship driver Lucas Auer, Esteban Muth, Brendon Leitch and Artem Petrov all had one race win each.

== Teams and drivers ==
Team	No.	Driver	Status	Rounds
MTEC Motorsport	5	(Romania) Petru Florescu		All
MTEC Motorsport	11	(Australia) Jackson Walls	R	2–5
MTEC Motorsport	36	(Japan) Kazuto Kotaka	R	All
MTEC Motorsport	54	(Australia) Calan Williams		All
Giles Motorsport	7	(South Africa) Raoul Hyman		All
Giles Motorsport	9	(Czech Republic) Petr Ptáček	R	All
Giles Motorsport	16	(Australia) Tommy Smith	R	All
Giles Motorsport	21	(United States) Dev Gore		All
Giles Motorsport	48	(New Zealand) Ken Smith		5
M2 Competition	8	(New Zealand) Marcus Armstrong		All
M2 Competition	10	(New Zealand) Liam Lawson	R	All
M2 Competition	12	(Russia) Artem Petrov		All
M2 Competition	22	(Austria) Lucas Auer		All
M2 Competition	28	(United States) Cameron Das		All
M2 Competition	30	(Belgium) Esteban Muth	R	All
Victory Motor Racing	66	(United States) Parker Locke	R	All
Victory Motor Racing	86	(New Zealand) Brendon Leitch		All

== Race calendar ==
The calendar for the series was announced on 19 June 2018, and will be held over five successive weekends in January and February. Races 2 and 3 of the second round at Teretonga were postponed to due high winds and rescheduled. Race 2 will be run at Hampton Downs, and Race 3 qualifying and race will be run at Taupō.

Round		Circuit	Date	Pole position	Fastest lap	Winning driver	Winning team
1	R1	Highlands Motorsport Park; Cromwell, Otago	12 January	(South Africa) Raoul Hyman	(New Zealand) Liam Lawson	(New Zealand) Liam Lawson	M2 Competition
1	R2	Highlands Motorsport Park; Cromwell, Otago	13 January		(New Zealand) Brendon Leitch	(New Zealand) Brendon Leitch	Victory Motor Racing
1	R3	Highlands Motorsport Park; Cromwell, Otago	13 January	(Austria) Lucas Auer	(New Zealand) Liam Lawson	(New Zealand) Liam Lawson	M2 Competition
2	R1	Teretonga Park; Invercargill, Southland	19 January	(New Zealand) Liam Lawson	(New Zealand) Marcus Armstrong	(New Zealand) Marcus Armstrong	M2 Competition
2	R2	Teretonga Park; Invercargill, Southland	20 January	Races 2 and 3 cancelled due to unsafe high wind conditions.			
2	R3	Teretonga Park; Invercargill, Southland	20 January	Races 2 and 3 cancelled due to unsafe high wind conditions.			
3	R1	Hampton Downs Motorsport Park; Hampton Downs, North Waikato	25 January	(Note: Race 1 at Hampton Downs was the make-up of Race 2 from Teretonga, featuring a partially reversed grid of the top six finishers from the first race.)	(United States) Cameron Das	(Russia) Artem Petrov	M2 Competition
3	R2	Hampton Downs Motorsport Park; Hampton Downs, North Waikato	26 January	(New Zealand) Marcus Armstrong	(New Zealand) Marcus Armstrong	(New Zealand) Marcus Armstrong	M2 Competition
3	R3	Hampton Downs Motorsport Park; Hampton Downs, North Waikato	27 January		(New Zealand) Liam Lawson	(New Zealand) Liam Lawson	M2 Competition
3	R4	Hampton Downs Motorsport Park; Hampton Downs, North Waikato	27 January	(New Zealand) Marcus Armstrong	(Russia) Artem Petrov	(New Zealand) Marcus Armstrong	M2 Competition
4	R1	Bruce McLaren Motorsport Park; Taupō, South Waikato	2 February	(New Zealand) Liam Lawson	(New Zealand) Liam Lawson	(New Zealand) Liam Lawson	M2 Competition
4	R2	Bruce McLaren Motorsport Park; Taupō, South Waikato	2 February	(New Zealand) Liam Lawson	(New Zealand) Marcus Armstrong	(Austria) Lucas Auer	M2 Competition
4	R3	Bruce McLaren Motorsport Park; Taupō, South Waikato	3 February		(New Zealand) Marcus Armstrong	(Belgium) Esteban Muth	M2 Competition
4	R4	Bruce McLaren Motorsport Park; Taupō, South Waikato	3 February	(Austria) Lucas Auer	(Austria) Lucas Auer	(New Zealand) Marcus Armstrong	M2 Competition
5	R1	Manfeild: Circuit Chris Amon; Feilding, Manawatū District	9 February	(New Zealand) Liam Lawson	(New Zealand) Marcus Armstrong	(New Zealand) Marcus Armstrong	M2 Competition
5	R2	Manfeild: Circuit Chris Amon; Feilding, Manawatū District	10 February		(United States) Cameron Das	(United States) Cameron Das	M2 Competition
5	R3	Manfeild: Circuit Chris Amon; Feilding, Manawatū District	10 February	(Austria) Lucas Auer	(New Zealand) Liam Lawson	(New Zealand) Liam Lawson	M2 Competition

== Championship standings ==
The series had introduced a new drivers' championship points system for the season. Drivers were awarded the same number of points for Races 1 & 3. Race 2 featured a reversed grid of the top 6 to 8 finishers from Race 1, and awarded reduced points to the top 15 finishers. Drivers must have completed 75% of the race distance and be running at the finish to score points.

=== Scoring system ===
Race (starting grid from qualifying)

Position	1st	2nd	3rd	4th	5th	6th	7th	8th	9th	10th	11th	12th	13th	14th	15th	16th	17th	18th	19th	20th
Points	35	31	27	24	22	20	18	16	14	12	10	9	8	7	6	5	4	3	2	1

Reversed grid Race

Position	1st	2nd	3rd	4th	5th	6th	7th	8th	9th	10th	11th	12th	13th	14th	15th
Points	20	18	16	14	12	10	9	8	7	6	5	4	3	2	1

=== Drivers' championship ===
Pos.	Driver	HIG			TER			HMP				TAU				MAN			Points
1	(New Zealand) Liam Lawson	1	5	1	**2**	C	C	7	3	1	Ret	**1**	**2**	3	3	**2**	5	1	356
2	(New Zealand) Marcus Armstrong	2	3	2	1	C	C	10	**1**	4	**1**	3	NC	8	1	1	9	2	346
3	(Austria) Lucas Auer	3	Ret	**4**	5	C	C	Ret	4	3	15	2	1	7	**2**	3	2	**Ret**	270
4	(South Africa) Raoul Hyman	**4**	2	3	11	C	C	5	2	9	10	5	3	6	5	9	6	4	270
5	(Belgium) Esteban Muth	6	4	11	9	C	C	Ret	6	2	5	7	6	1	4	6	3	5	258
6	(New Zealand) Brendon Leitch	5	1	9	8	C	C	3	14	10	4	13	5	2	9	4	4	6	245
7	(United States) Cameron Das	9	6	7	4	C	C	Ret	7	5	3	15	10	5	8	7	1	Ret	205
8	(Australia) Calan Williams	11	7	8	7	C	C	Ret	8	8	7	8	8	9	7	5	7	Ret	183
9	(Russia) Artem Petrov	10	Ret	6	3	C	C	1	Ret	7	2	4	4	4	Ret	DNS	DNS	Ret	181
10	(Japan) Kazuto Kotaka	8	Ret	10	6	C	C	11	9	6	6	9	15	10	6	Ret	10	3	176
11	(Czech Republic) Petr Ptáček	7	8	5	12	C	C	2	Ret	11	12	14	7	11	Ret	Ret	12	Ret	123
12	(Australia) Jackson Walls				13	C	C	8	5	Ret	8	6	13	12	10	10	Ret	Ret	110
13	(United States) Dev Gore	14	9	13	10	C	C	4	13	14	14	12	9	14	12	11	Ret	Ret	109
14	(Australia) Tommy Smith	15	12	12	14	C	C	12	11	12	9	11	14	13	13	14	8	Ret	101
15	(United States) Parker Locke	13	11	14	15	C	C	9	12	15	11	16	12	15	Ret	12	11	7	100
16	(Romania) Petru Florescu	12	10	Ret	Ret	C	C	6	10	13	13	10	11	Ret	11	8	Ret	DNS	98
17	(New Zealand) Ken Smith															13	13	8	27
Pos.	Driver	HIG			TER			HMP				TAU				MAN			Points

Colour	Result
Gold	Winner
Silver	Second place
Bronze	Third place
Green	Points classification
Blue	Non-points classification
Blue	Non-classified finish (NC)
Purple	Retired, not classified (Ret)
Red	Did not qualify (DNQ)
Red	Did not pre-qualify (DNPQ)
Black	Disqualified (DSQ)
White	Did not start (DNS)
White	Withdrew (WD)
White	Race cancelled (C)
Blank	Did not practice (DNP)
Blank	Did not arrive (DNA)
Blank	Excluded (EX)

**Bold** – Pole
Italics – Fastest Lap

Rookie
