= 2019 New Zealand Grand Prix =

- Race 3, Round 5 of 5 of the 2019 Toyota Racing Series

Race details
- Date: 10 February 2019
- Official name: LXIV New Zealand Grand Prix
- Location: Manfeild: Circuit Chris Amon, Feilding, New Zealand
- Course: Permanent racing facility
- Course length: 3.033 km (1.885 miles)
- Distance: 35 laps, 106.155 km (65.975 miles)
- Weather: Fine

Pole position
Driver	(Austria) Lucas Auer	M2 Competition
- Time: 1:02.388

Fastest lap
Driver	(New Zealand) Liam Lawson	M2 Competition
- Time: 1:04.065 on lap 32

Podium
First	(New Zealand) Liam Lawson	M2 Competition
Second	(New Zealand) Marcus Armstrong	M2 Competition
Third	(Japan) Kazuto Kotaka	MTEC Motorsport

The 2019 New Zealand Grand Prix event for open wheel racing cars was held at Manfeild: Circuit Chris Amon near Feilding on 10 February 2019. It was the sixty-fourth New Zealand Grand Prix and fielded Toyota Racing Series cars. The event also served as the third race of the fifth round of the 2019 Toyota Racing Series, the final race of the series.

== Report ==
=== Qualifying ===
Pos	No	Driver	Team	Time	Grid
1	22	(Austria) Lucas Auer	M2 Competition	1:02.388	1
2	10	(New Zealand) Liam Lawson	M2 Competition	1:02.411	2
3	8	(New Zealand) Marcus Armstrong	M2 Competition	1:02.536	3
4	86	(New Zealand) Brendon Leitch	Victory Motor Racing	1:02.902	4
5	30	(Belgium) Esteban Muth	M2 Competition	1:02.971	5
6	28	(United States) Cameron Das	M2 Competition	1:02.984	6
7	7	(South Africa) Raoul Hyman	Giles Motorsport	1:03.053	7
8	9	(Czech Republic) Petr Ptáček	Giles Motorsport	1:03.080	8
9	12	(Russia) Artem Petrov	M2 Competition	1:03.081	9
10	54	(Australia) Calan Williams	MTEC Motorsport	1:03.098	10
11	5	(Romania) Petru Florescu	MTEC Motorsport	1:03.100	11
12	36	(Japan) Kazuto Kotaka	MTEC Motorsport	1:03.201	12
13	11	(Australia) Jackson Walls	MTEC Motorsport	1:03.232	13
14	66	(United States) Parker Locke	Victory Motor Racing	1:03.400	14
15	16	(Australia) Thomas Smith	Giles Motorsport	1:03.463	15
16	21	(United States) Dev Gore	Giles Motorsport	1:03.918	16
17	48	(New Zealand) Ken Smith	Giles Motorsport	1:05.444	17

=== Race ===
Pos	No	Driver	Team	Laps	Time / Retired	Grid
1	10	(New Zealand) Liam Lawson	M2 Competition	35	39min 52.929sec	2
2	8	(New Zealand) Marcus Armstrong	M2 Competition	35	+ 2.582 s^{1}	3
3	36	(Japan) Kazuto Kotaka	MTEC Motorsport	35	+ 10.995 s	12
4	7	(South Africa) Raoul Hyman	Giles Motorsport	35	+ 13.036 s	7
5	30	(Belgium) Esteban Muth	M2 Competition	35	+ 13.499 s^{2}	5
6	86	(New Zealand) Brendon Leitch	Victory Motor Racing	35	+ 13.653 s	4
7	66	(United States) Parker Locke	Victory Motor Racing	35	+ 15.817 s	14
8	48	(New Zealand) Ken Smith	Giles Motorsport	34	+ 1 lap	17
Ret	21	(United States) Dev Gore	Giles Motorsport	15	Accident	16
Ret	11	(Australia) Jackson Walls	MTEC Motorsport	15	Accident	13
Ret	22	(Austria) Lucas Auer	M2 Competition	12	Accident	1
Ret	28	(United States) Cameron Das	M2 Competition	12	Accident	6
Ret	54	(Australia) Calan Williams	MTEC Motorsport	12	Accident	10
Ret	16	(Australia) Thomas Smith	Giles Motorsport	12	Accident damage	15
Ret	12	(Russia) Artem Petrov	M2 Competition	12	Suspension	9
Ret	9	(Czech Republic) Petr Ptáček	Giles Motorsport	7	Spun off	8
DNS	5	(Romania) Petru Florescu	MTEC Motorsport	0	Did Not Start	11

Notes

1. – Armstrong was given a five-second time penalty for forcing another driver (Lawson) off the road.
2. – Muth was given a five-second time penalty for 'breach of driving conduct'.

Preceded by 2019 Taupo TRS round	Toyota Racing Series; 2018	Succeeded by end of season
Preceded by 2018 New Zealand Grand Prix	New Zealand Grand Prix; 2019	Succeeded by 2020 New Zealand Grand Prix
