= Liam Lawson =

New Zealand racing driver (born 2002)

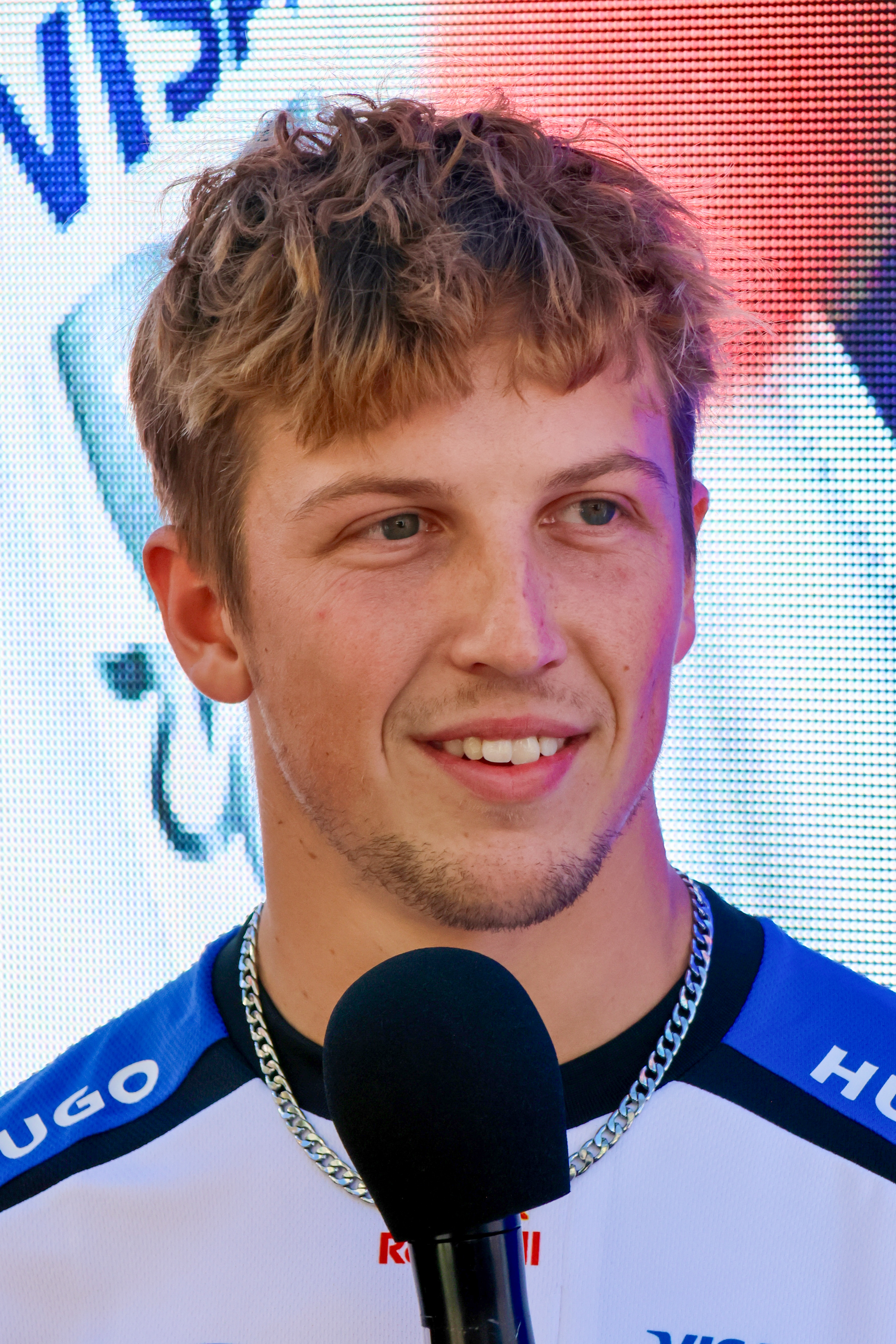
- Lawson at the 2026 Australian Grand Prix
- Born: Liam Jared Lawson; 11 February 2002 (age 24); Hastings, New Zealand

Formula One World Championship career
- Nationality: (New Zealand) New Zealander
- 2026 team: Racing Bulls-Red Bull Ford; Red Bull Racing-Red Bull Ford
- Car number: 30 (Note: Lawson selected the number 30 as his personal driver number, per FIA regulations; in 2023, he competed using the standard reserve number 40 for AlphaTauri.)
- Entries: 56 (56 starts)
- Championships: 0
- Wins: 0
- Podiums: 0
- Career points: 133
- Pole positions: 0
- Fastest laps: 1
- First entry: 2023 Dutch Grand Prix
- Last entry: 2026 Las Vegas Grand Prix
- 2025 position: 14th (38 pts)

Previous series
- 2023; 2021–2022; 2021; 2019–2020; 2019–2020; 2019; 2018; 2018; 2017; 2016–2017: Super Formula; FIA Formula 2; DTM; FIA Formula 3; Toyota Racing Series; Euroformula Open; F3 Asian; ADAC F4; Australian F4; New Zealand FFord

Championship titles
- 2019; 2016–17: Toyota Racing Series; New Zealand FFord

Liam Jared Lawson (born 11 February 2002) is a New Zealand racing driver who competes in Formula One for Racing Bulls.

Born in Hastings and raised in Pukekohe, Lawson began competitive kart racing aged six. Lawson, who is mentored by three-time New Zealand Grand Prix winner Ken Smith, graduated to junior formulae in 2015, winning his first title in the New Zealand Formula Ford Championship as a privateer. He finished runner-up in the 2017 Australian F4, 2018 ADAC F4 and 2019 Euroformula Open championships, before winning the Toyota Racing Series in 2019 with M2. Lawson then progressed to FIA Formula 3 in 2020 before moving to FIA Formula 2 in 2021, where he placed third the following season with Carlin. He also competed in the 2021 Deutsche Tourenwagen Masters for Red Bull AF Corse alongside Alex Albon, finishing runner-up to Maximilian Götz amidst a controversial finale. Lawson then competed in the 2023 Super Formula Championship, finishing runner-up to Ritomo Miyata with Mugen.

A member of the Red Bull Junior Team since 2019, Lawson was a reserve driver for both Red Bull and AlphaTauri from 2022 to 2024. Lawson made his Formula One debut at the 2023 Dutch Grand Prix, replacing an injured Daniel Ricciardo at AlphaTauri for five Grands Prix in 2023, scoring his maiden points finish in Singapore. He replaced Ricciardo full-time at the re-branded Racing Bulls in 2024 from the United States Grand Prix onwards. Lawson was promoted to a full-time driver with parent team Red Bull for his 2025 campaign—replacing Sergio Pérez to partner Max Verstappen—but was demoted after the second round. Lawson is contracted to remain at Racing Bulls until at least the end of the 2027 season.

== Early and personal life ==
Liam Jared Lawson was born on 11 February 2002 in Hastings, New Zealand. He was raised in Pukekohe, which was home to Pukekohe Park Raceway, located in the Auckland Region of the North Island. His parents sold their house to fund his racing career.

Lawson selected the number 30 as his personal driver number in Formula One, which he had used since age eight in honour of his karting mentor. He plays the guitar and has recorded music. He went to the same school in Waiau Pa with Supercars driver Matt Payne.

== Junior racing career ==
=== Karting ===
Lawson began karting in 2008, competing in numerous championships across New Zealand, including two karting titles in 2014. Each year, he returned to the Kartsport Auckland Go Kart Club on Rosebank Road, Avondale and competed in the big City of Sails race on Auckland Anniversary Weekend.

=== Lower formulae ===
In 2015, Lawson made his single-seater debut in the Formula First Manfeild Winter Series with Sabre Motorsport, taking a win and ten podiums to finish second overall. A few months later, he joined Sabre to contest the NZ Formula First championship, taking a win and three podiums on his way to sixth in the championship and the Rookie of the Year title. The following year, Lawson graduated to the NZ F1600 Championship Series. There he dominated proceedings, claiming fourteen of the fifteen victories on offer to become the youngest champion in not just the series' history, but the youngest ever Formula Ford champion in world at the time.

In 2017, Lawson moved up to the Australian F4 championship with BRM, taking five wins to finish second in only his rookie season. The following year, Lawson remained at Formula 4 level, moving across to contest the ADAC Formula 4 championship with Van Amersfoort Racing and received backing from Turner's, the New Zealand used car network that had previously sponsored IndyCar champion Scott Dixon. Claiming three wins and three pole positions, Lawson's performances saw him claim his second consecutive F4 runner up position, behind Lirim Zendeli.

=== Toyota Racing Series ===
In November 2018, Lawson joined M2 Competition for the 2019 championship. Lawson dominated on debut at Highlands, taking two races wins by over nine-seconds each and won the Dorothy Smith Memorial Trophy as a result of winning Race 3. Claiming three additional wins across the season, Lawson secured the title at the New Zealand Grand Prix after a season long battle with Ferrari junior and fellow countryman Marcus Armstrong.

=== Euroformula Open Championship ===
Lawson had been set to join the inaugural season of the Formula European Masters with Motopark, alongside fellow Red Bull Junior Yuki Tsunoda, but followed the German outfit to the Euroformula Open Championship when Formula European Masters was cancelled due to a lack of entrants. Lawson won the opening races at Paul Ricard, and also in Pau. He would go on to take two more victories to become runner-up to Marino Sato. He did however, win the rookies' championship.

=== International Formula 3 ===
In November 2018, Lawson competed in the season finale of the Asian F3 championship with Irish outfit Pinnacle Motorsport. He proceeded to dominate the weekend, taking all wins, fastest laps and pole positions on offer to finish eighth in the championship.

=== FIA Formula 3 Championship ===
==== 2019 ====
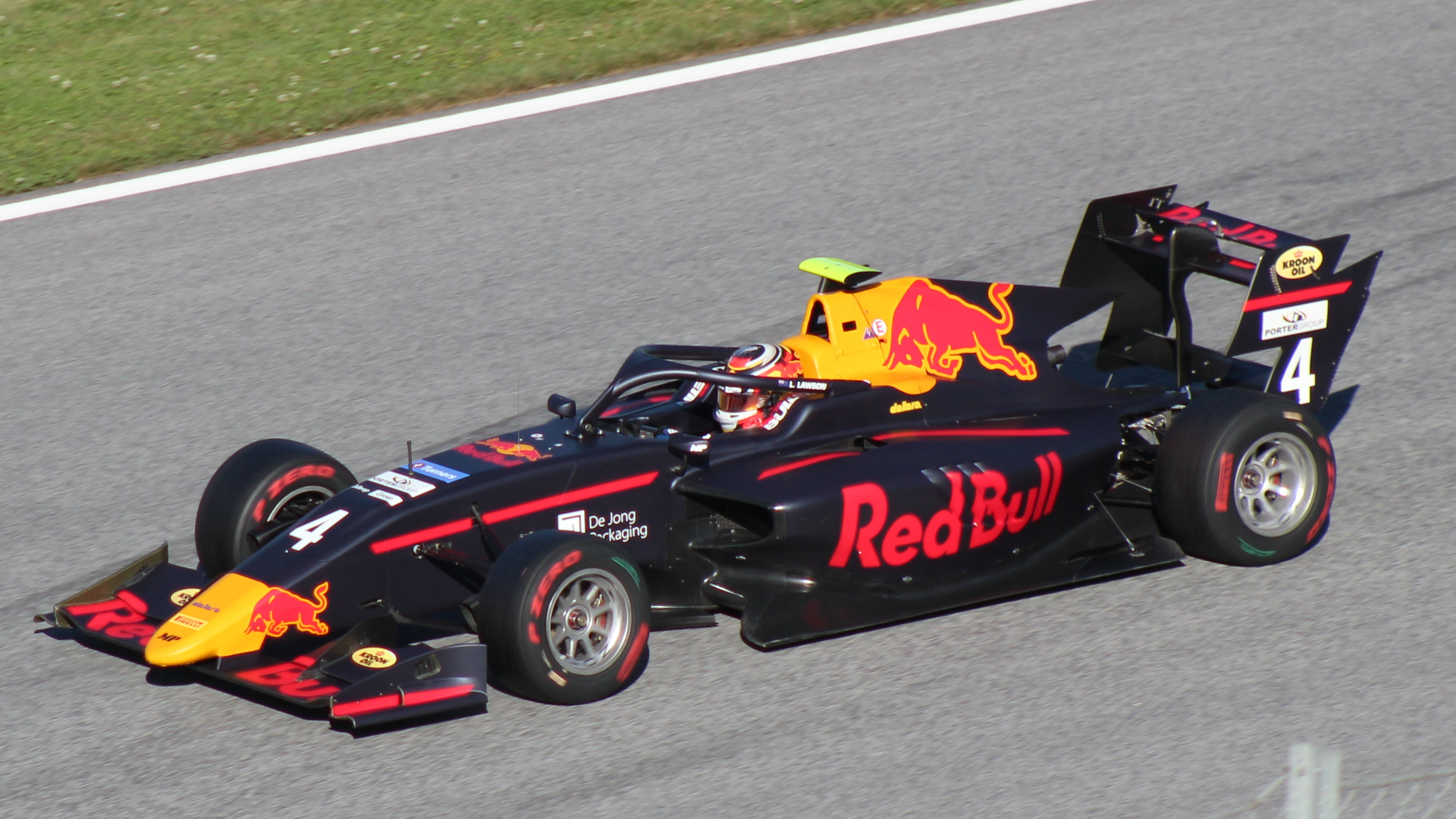
Lawson racing for MP Motorsport during the 2019 Spielberg Formula 3 round

In March 2019, Lawson joined MP Motorsport to contest the inaugural FIA Formula 3 Championship, alongside Richard Verschoor and Simo Laaksonen. His debut at Barcelona proved challenging, qualifying lowest of the MP Motorsport drivers and retired from Race 1 due to a throttle motor failure. Improvement followed in Paul Ricard, where he scored his first points with ninth place in Race 1 and further advanced to fifth in Race 2. After failing to score in Austria, he rebounded in Silverstone and held the lead for half of the race before being overtaken by Leonardo Pulcini and Robert Shwartzman, eventually securing third place. The result marked both Lawson's and MP Motorsport's first podium of the season. Lawson endured scoreless rounds in Hungary and Spa-Francorchamps before returning to form in Monza. After qualifying thirteenth, he progressed to seventh in Race 1, giving him a front row start in Race 2. Although he dropped positions at the start, Lawson recovered and passed Fabio Scherer and Jake Hughes to finish second behind Yuki Tsunoda, earning his second podium. In the final round in Sochi, Lawson made up ten positions in Race 2 to finish eighth, after overtaking Max Fewtrell and Christian Lundgaard on the last lap. Overall, Lawson concluded the season eleventh in the championship with 41 points, scoring both of the team's podium finishes.

===== Macau Grand Prix =====
Just two weeks after the final round, Lawson was announced to compete at that year's Macau Grand Prix, remaining with MP Motorsport. Lawson qualified fifteenth, but in the qualification race slipped back to twentieth, before eventually coming through to finish seventh.

==== 2020 ====
Lawson moved to Hitech Grand Prix for the 2020 season, partnering Max Fewtrell and Red Bull junior Dennis Hauger. He opened the season in Austria by qualifying twelfth and improving to sixth in the first race. and charged to sixth. In Race 2, Lawson climbed to third before overtaking Clément Novalak and David Beckmann to move into the race lead. He resisted late-race pressure from former teammate Richard Verschoor to secure his maiden Formula 3 victory. During the second Austrian round, Lawson qualified tenth and finished eighth place in wet conditions in Race 1. Starting third in Race 2, he moved into the lead after passing Jake Hughes and Théo Pourchaire. A prolonged battle ultimately ended in a collision between the pair on lap 21, resulting in a double retirement which handed the win to Pourchaire. Lawson endured a difficult weekend in Hungary, retiring from both races due to mechanical failures.

From Silverstone onwards, Lawson scored points in every remaining race of the season. There, he narrowly missed out on pole position, but overtook polesitter Logan Sargeant on the opening lap to claim his second win of the year. He added a seventh place in Race 2. During the second Silverstone round, Lawson again qualified second and finished third in the opening race, before narrowly missing a podium in Race 2 after running wide while battling Pourchaire. In Barcelona, Lawson qualified third despite an engine issue compromising his pole position attempt. He finished second in Race 1 after overtaking Sargeant late on; followed by seventh in Race 2, which elevated him to third in the championship standings.

In Spa-Francorchamps, Lawson finished seventh in Race 1 and recovered to third in Race 2 after losing positions at the start. Lawson initially qualified fourth in Monza. Lawson inherited pole position in Monza following post-qualifying penalties. Damage sustained in early contact with Matteo Nannini limited him to sixth in Race 1. In Race 2, he finished second on the road after briefly leading, but a post-race penalty for forcing another driver off-track dropped him to seventh. He concluded his season in Mugello, by finishing tenth in the first race, before dominating Race 2 to secure his third victory of the season. Lawson finished fifth in the championship with 143 points, recording three wins and six podiums throughout the season.

=== Road to Indy ===
In December 2017, Lawson partook in the Mazda Road to Indy Shootout, finishing as the fastest driver but losing out on the scholarship to Ireland's Keith Donegan.

=== FIA Formula 2 Championship ===
==== 2021 ====
In January 2021, Lawson was announced to be competing in the FIA Formula 2 Championship with Hitech Grand Prix alongside Jüri Vips. Lawson qualified eighth on his debut in Bahrain. In the opening sprint race, he made a strong start to take the lead and successfully defended against late pressure from Jehan Daruvala to secure his maiden win on debut. His fortunes were reversed in the second sprint however, as Lawson was taken out by Felipe Drugovich in a three-way scrap for third place. Nevertheless, he redeemed himself with third place in the feature after a pass on Richard Verschoor on the last lap. Lawson ended the opening round second in the championship. In Monaco, Lawson qualified twelfth and finished ninth in the first sprint race. He started the second sprint from pole position after Marcus Armstrong was unable to take the grid. After briefly losing the lead, Lawson reclaimed first place with an overtake on Oscar Piastri at Rascasse and went on to take the chequered flag in first. However, he was later disqualified for using a prohibited throttle map, handing victory to Dan Ticktum. He later described his disqualification as "hard to swallow". He finished seventh in the feature race.

Lawson claimed his maiden pole position in Baku, forming a front row for Hitech. His opening sprint race ended early after contact with Piastri broke his suspension, but recovered to finish seventh in the second sprint despite a power loss. In the feature race, an aggressive defence on Théo Pourchaire during the opening lap earned Lawson a ten-second penalty; he eventually finished sixth. In Silverstone, Lawson qualified eleventh and scored points in both sprint races, finishing seventh and fifth respectively. He placed just outside the points in the feature race. In Monza, Lawson qualified fourth but front wing damage forced him into a pit stop early during the opening sprint race; he managed to recover to fifth. He finished fourth in the second sprint and ran as high as second in the feature race before retiring due to a power issue. Lawson qualified eighth in Sochi, but retired from the first sprint after damaging his suspension while running third. Lawson finished seventh in the feature race after a slow start.

In Jeddah, Lawson qualified tenth and started from reverse pole in the first sprint, but was outdragged by Marcus Armstrong on the opening lap; nevertheless he finished second which marked his first podium since Bahrain. He retired from the second sprint after crashing out late in the race, and finished ninth in an aborted feature race. Lawson qualified seventh for the Yas Marina finale. He finished fifth and sixth in the sprint races, but retired from the feature race due to an engine issue. Lawson concluded his rookie season ninth in the championship with 103 points, scoring one win and three podiums.

==== 2022 ====
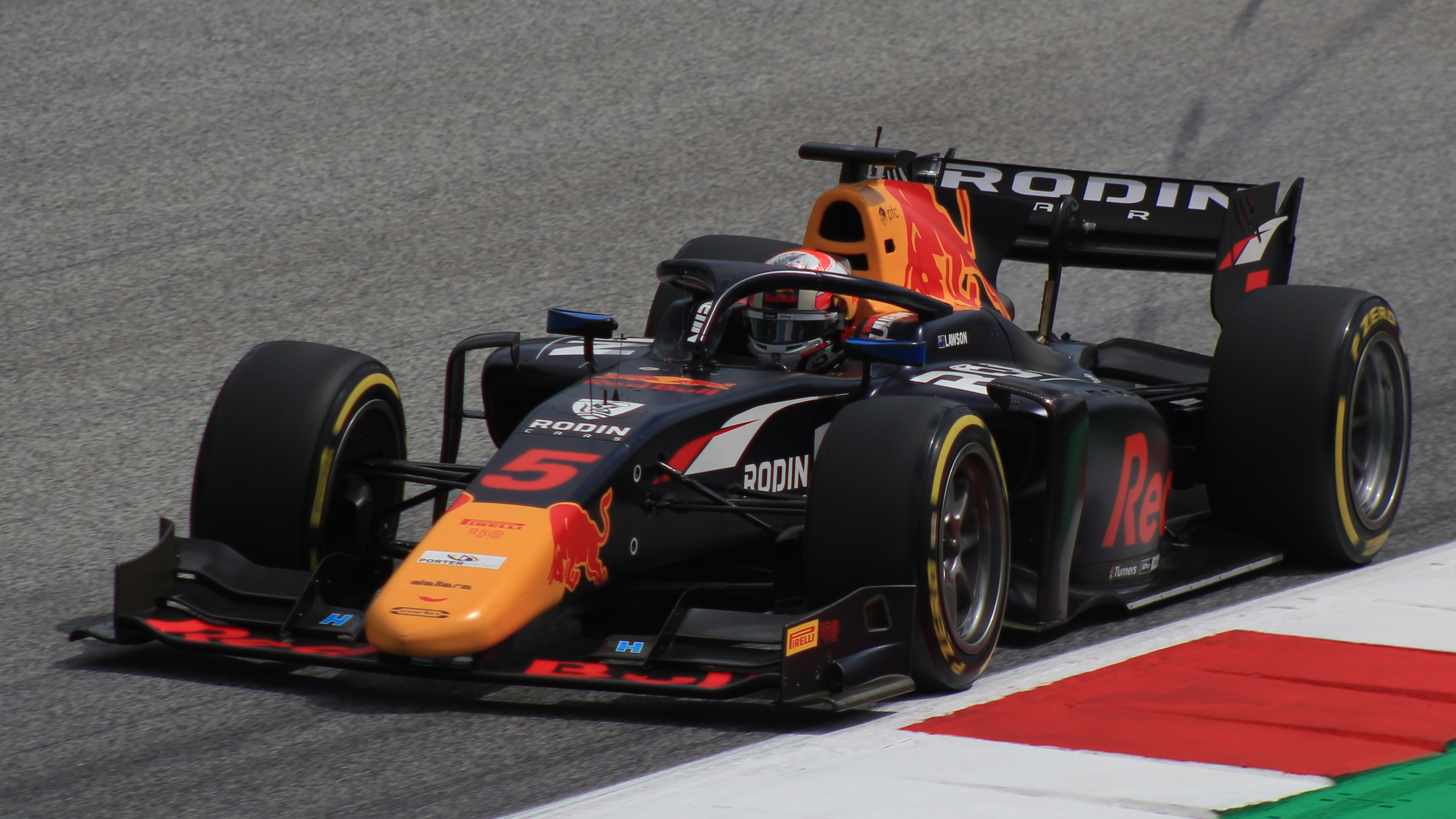
Lawson driving the Dallara F2 2018 during the 2022 Spielberg Formula 2 round

Lawson switched to Carlin for the 2022 season alongside American Logan Sargeant.

He began his campaign strongly in Bahrain, qualifying sixth. He finished third in the sprint after passing Ralph Boschung late, and followed this with second place in the feature race after avoiding incidents among the leading runners, thereby coming away with a double podium. Following the round, Lawson noted that he felt more comfortable in Formula 2 after contesting a dual campaign in the 2021 DTM season. In Jeddah, Lawson qualified fifth and soon found himself in podium contention during the sprint race after Dennis Hauger's pit lane error. Following a safety car restart, he swiftly overcame Calan Williams and Jake Hughes to secure his first win of the season. He was set to continue his podium streak running third during the feature race, but retired due to a loose wheel immediately after his pit stop, nevertheless he retained second place in the championship.

Lawson endured a difficult triple-header thereafter. In Imola, he qualified fourteenth and recovered to eighth in the sprint race, but retired from the feature race after a steering wheel failure caused a crash. In Barcelona, Lawson qualified sixteenth and narrowly missed points in the sprint race. Despite a strong start in the feature race, he faded to ninth after losing places to cars on fresher tyres. In Monaco, Lawson initially secured pole position, but his lap was deleted for failing to slow under yellow flags, and he received a five-place grid penalty for the sprint race. He scored a point with eighth in the sprint but stalled on the grid in the feature race and later retired with engine issues. Lawson returned to form in Baku, qualifying second. He finished third after a strong restart late in the race saw him gain multiple positions, but suffered a puncture after being hit by Jack Doohan in the feature race; he was forced to pit which resulted in a fifteenth-place finish.

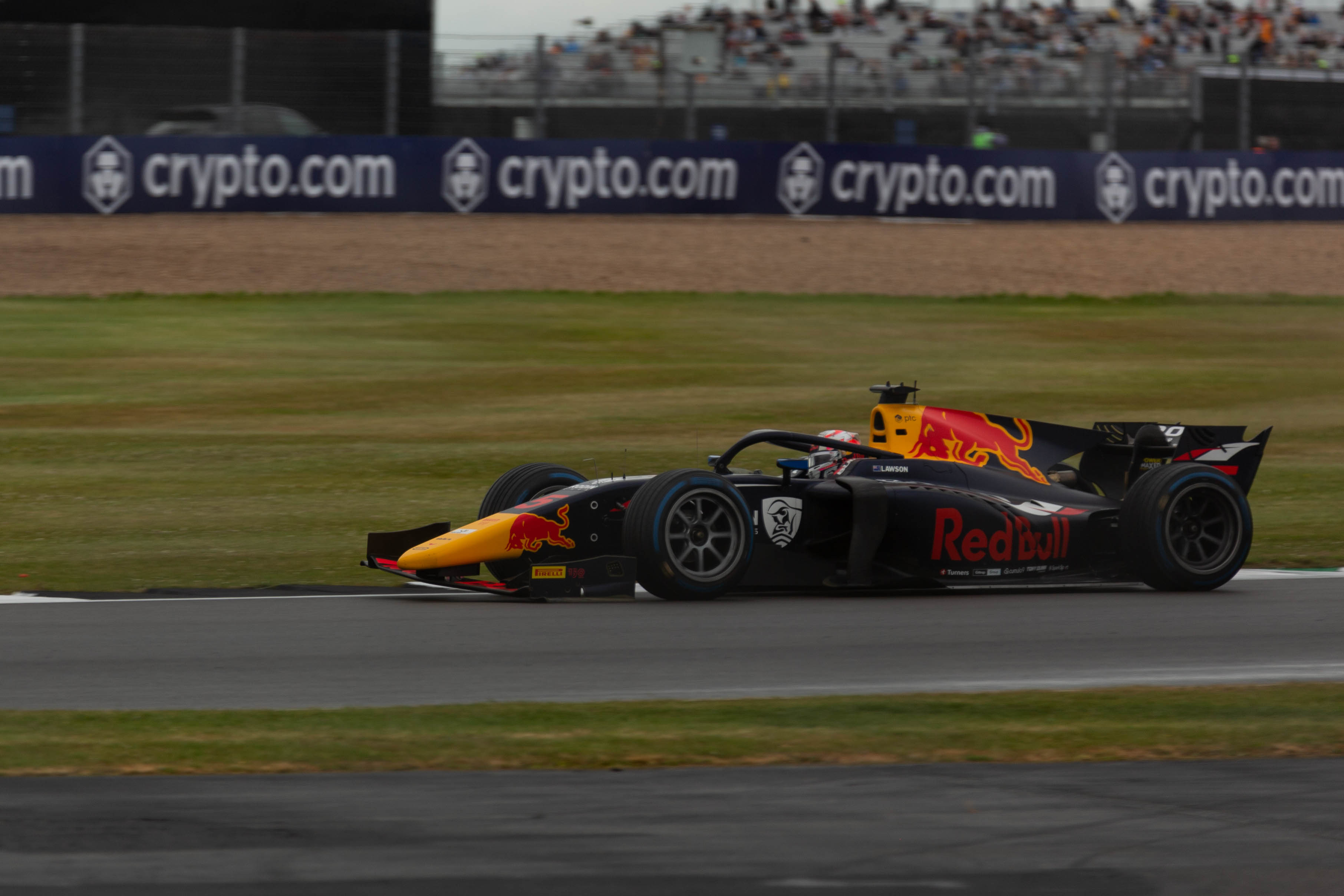
Lawson secured four wins and ten podiums on his way to finishing third in the championship.

In Silverstone, Lawson qualified fifth. Contact in the sprint race caused front wing damage which necessitated a pit stop, and he finished 20th. In the feature race, he made a strong start to move into third, and held the position to take another podium. In the Austria, Lawson qualified fourteenth and retired from the sprint race after stalling on the grid and encountering technical issues. He salvaged a point with tenth in the feature race after opting for slick tyres at the start. Lawson qualified ninth in Paul Ricard. After briefly losing second at the start of the sprint race, Lawson eventually made the move for the lead with a late pass on Jehan Daruvala, earning him his second win of the year. He finished sixth in the feature race. In Hungary, Lawson qualified eleventh and recovered to sixth in the sprint race. He placed seventh in the feature race on the alternate strategy.

At Spa-Francorchamps, Lawson qualified sixth. A good start moved him into second at the start, before overtaking Ralph Boschung on the next lap to secure another victory. He followed this with a third place in the feature race after a battle with Enzo Fittipaldi. In Zandvoort, Lawson qualified sixth position and finished fourth in the sprint race after overtaking Vips at the start. A strategy gamble on hard tyres in the feature race was compromised by a safety car, leaving him twelfth at the finish. In Monza, Lawson qualified second. He recovered from an average start in the sprint race to finish sixth, later promoted to fifth following a post-race penalty for Richard Verschoor. In the feature race, Lawson briefly led after overtaking Doohan at the start but lost time after failing to capitalise on a pit stop under the safety car. He was later spun around by Vips which caused front wing damage, and eventually finished thirteenth. At the Abu Dhabi finale, Lawson qualified ninth and secured his fourth victory of the season in the sprint race after overtaking Verschoor. In the feature race, he finished third after an early pit stop proved successful. Lawson concluded the season third in the drivers' championship with 149 points, four victories and ten podiums.

== Formula One career ==
In February 2019, Lawson joined the Red Bull Junior Team.

In July 2021, Lawson got his first experience in an F1 car at the 2021 Goodwood Festival of Speed, driving the 2011 Red Bull RB7. Lawson took part in the Young Driver Test at the Yas Marina Circuit at the end of the 2021 season with Scuderia AlphaTauri, driving the AT02. For the 2022 season, he served as a reserve/test driver for AlphaTauri. In March 2022 Franz Tost revealed that Lawson would make his Formula One debut in a free practice session for them during the season. He made his free practice debut at the 2022 Belgian Grand Prix.

Following then-reserve driver Jüri Vips' exclamation of a racial slur during a Twitch livestream (in which, incidentally, Lawson was also present) during June 2022, team principal Christian Horner confirmed that Lawson had been promoted to replace Vips as the reserve driver for Red Bull Racing, sharing this role with AlphaTauri. Lawson made another FP1 appearance with AlphaTauri at the 2022 Mexico City Grand Prix. He made his Red Bull debut during practice at the season-ending Abu Dhabi Grand Prix. Lawson then took part in the post-season tests in Abu Dhabi driving the Red Bull.

Lawson continued as reserve driver for Red Bull and AlphaTauri in 2023. In February, he drove the RB7 for a demonstration run during the 2023 Bathurst 12 Hour. Following the British Grand Prix, Nyck de Vries was removed from his seat at AlphaTauri, with Daniel Ricciardo being chosen ahead of Lawson to replace the Dutchman. Following the announcement, Lawson stated that he "understood their decision" and commented that jumping in mid-season would be "extremely tough".

=== AlphaTauri / Racing Bulls (2023–2024) ===
==== 2023: Debut in a reserve role ====
Lawson made his Formula One debut at the 2023 Dutch Grand Prix for AlphaTauri, temporarily replacing Ricciardo after he sustained a broken hand in a crash in Friday's second free practice session. With limited practice time which included a spin, he qualified in 20th. Despite a ten-second penalty for impeding Kevin Magnussen in the pits, Lawson finished in 13th place in a challenging and eventful debut race. Most notably, it included battling with Ferrari's Charles Leclerc and finishing higher than his AlphaTauri teammate Yuki Tsunoda. On 28 August 2023, AlphaTauri team principal Franz Tost stated that Lawson would likely continue to race for the team at the 2023 Italian Grand Prix. This statement was confirmed hours later, as Lawson would also be keeping his replacement role until Ricciardo is fit to race. Lawson qualified in 12th place at the 2023 Italian Grand Prix and finished in 11th place. At the 2023 Singapore Grand Prix, Lawson qualified a career-best tenth place, most notably, knocking championship leader Max Verstappen out of the second part of qualifying. After fending off Alex Albon during the last laps, Lawson finished the race in ninth, scoring points for the first time in Formula One as well as becoming the second AlphaTauri driver that year to score.

Lawson finished in eleventh at the 2023 Japanese Grand Prix, ahead of Tsunoda in 12th. Lawson endured a rough final appearance at the Qatar Grand Prix, where he spun out of the sprint and finished last of the runners during the race. Ricciardo was well enough to return for the following United States Grand Prix, and Lawson returned to his reserve role.

==== 2024: Late-season stint ====
Lawson continued his role as reserve driver for Red Bull Racing and RB Formula One Team (the rebranded AlphaTauri) in 2024. Lawson completed a filming day with the Red Bull RB20 in mid-July at Silverstone, following the British Grand Prix. At the end of July, he completed another day of testing for RB with the 2022 AlphaTauri AT03 at Imola. Due to poor performances by Ricciardo in the early parts of the season, rumors speculated that Lawson could replace him mid-season, but Ricciardo denied later in the season that manager Helmut Marko had threatened to do so.

Ricciardo was dropped by RB after the Singapore Grand Prix, with Lawson replacing him for the remaining six rounds of the season. At the United States Grand Prix, Lawson started 19th due to engine penalties. Starting on the hard tyre, Lawson went long and was able to jump teammate Tsunoda during the pit stops. His efforts yielded him ninth place, which received praise from Christian Horner. Lawson qualified for the Mexico City Grand Prix in 12th. He had a contentious battle in the race with Red Bull driver Sergio Pérez, and made contact with him, causing Lawson to raise his middle finger at him after passing him a few laps later. He ultimately finished one place ahead of Pérez in 16th, and later apologised as he admitted that it was "not something that [I] should have done". After narrowly missing out on points in his first sprint at the São Paulo Grand Prix, Lawson produced his best qualifying result to date in a rain-hit session, securing fifth on the grid, two places behind Tsunoda. In the race, although he was spun by Oscar Piastri on lap 26, Lawson was able to withstand the treacherous conditions and finish in ninth place.

At the Las Vegas Grand Prix, starting 14th, Lawson attempted a one-stop strategy, but a long second stint left him pitting late and he eventually finished 16th. Lawson had a miserable Qatar Grand Prix, colliding with Valtteri Bottas in the opening laps which earned him a ten-second penalty. Attaining floor damage from the contact, he was left to finish in 13th place. At the Abu Dhabi Grand Prix, Lawson had another troubled race when his front left wheel was not fitted correctly during his pit stop, forcing him to pit again. A mechanical issue later forced him out of the race with three laps remaining. Lawson finished the season 21st in the standings, collecting four points across the six Grand Prix he competed in.

=== Red Bull Racing (2025) ===
Lawson was promoted to Red Bull Racing in 2025 to replace Sergio Pérez, partnering defending four-time World Drivers' Champion Max Verstappen. At the season-opening Australian Grand Prix, he qualified eighteenth before crashing out of the race in changing conditions. Lawson qualified last for both the sprint and main race in China, finishing fourteenth at the former and twelfth at the latter following three disqualifications—and a penalty for Jack Doohan—ahead of him; Red Bull opened discussions to replace him with Yuki Tsunoda after his performances in the opening two rounds.

=== Return to Racing Bulls (2025–present) ===
==== 2025: Mid-season demotion ====
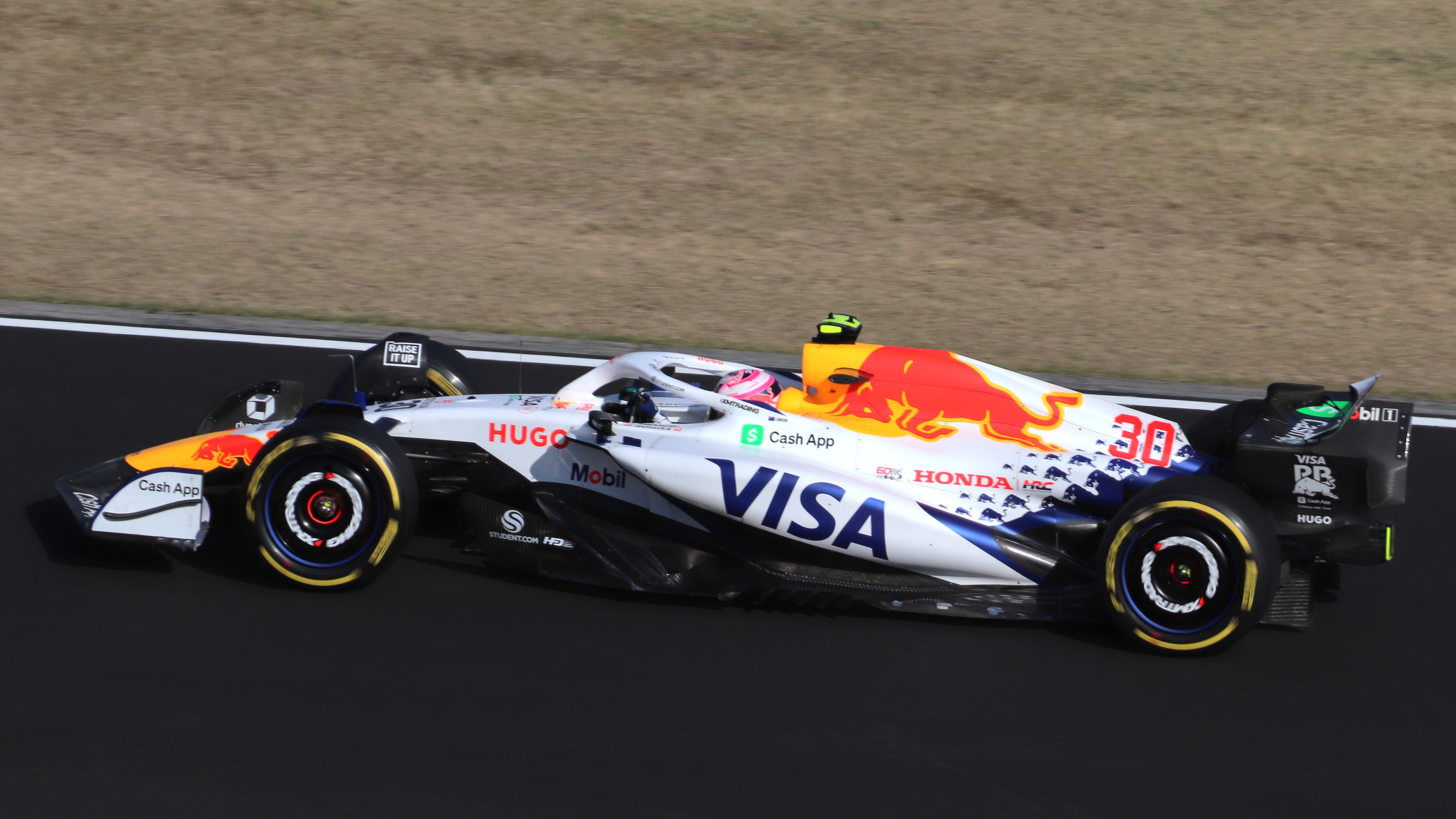
Lawson was demoted to Racing Bulls from the Japanese Grand Prix onwards in 2025.

Lawson was replaced by Yuki Tsunoda from the Japanese Grand Prix onwards, with Lawson moving back to Racing Bulls to partner FIA Formula 2 runner-up Isack Hadjar for the remainder of 2025. Team adviser Helmut Marko admitted Red Bull "made a mistake" in their decision to promote Lawson only 11 Grands Prix into his career, adding that he "lost confidence and [couldn't] show his real potential". He finished seventeenth on his return after a strategic error, having qualified fourteenth. Lawson received two penalties as he finished sixteenth at the Bahrain Grand Prix: one for causing a collision with Lance Stroll and another with Nico Hülkenberg. He finished eleventh in Saudi Arabia, dropped to twelfth after receiving a 10-second time penalty for leaving the circuit. He finished thirteenth in the Miami sprint after receiving a five-second penalty for a collision with Fernando Alonso, and retired during the main race due to floor damage. He scored his first points of the season at the Monaco Grand Prix, where he played a key role in helping teammate Hadjar finish sixth, as he claimed eighth. He scored points again at the Austrian Grand Prix in a career-best sixth. He sustained terminal damage after colliding with Esteban Ocon on the opening lap of the British Grand Prix. Lawson finished eighth at both the Belgian and Hungarian Grands Prix, holding Max Verstappen behind him at the latter. Lawson broke both his qualifying and race finish records at the Azerbaijan Grand Prix, qualifying third and finishing fifth. Lawson finished 15th at the Singapore Grand Prix, remaining 9 points ahead of Hadjar in the drivers' standings.

==== 2026: New regulations ====
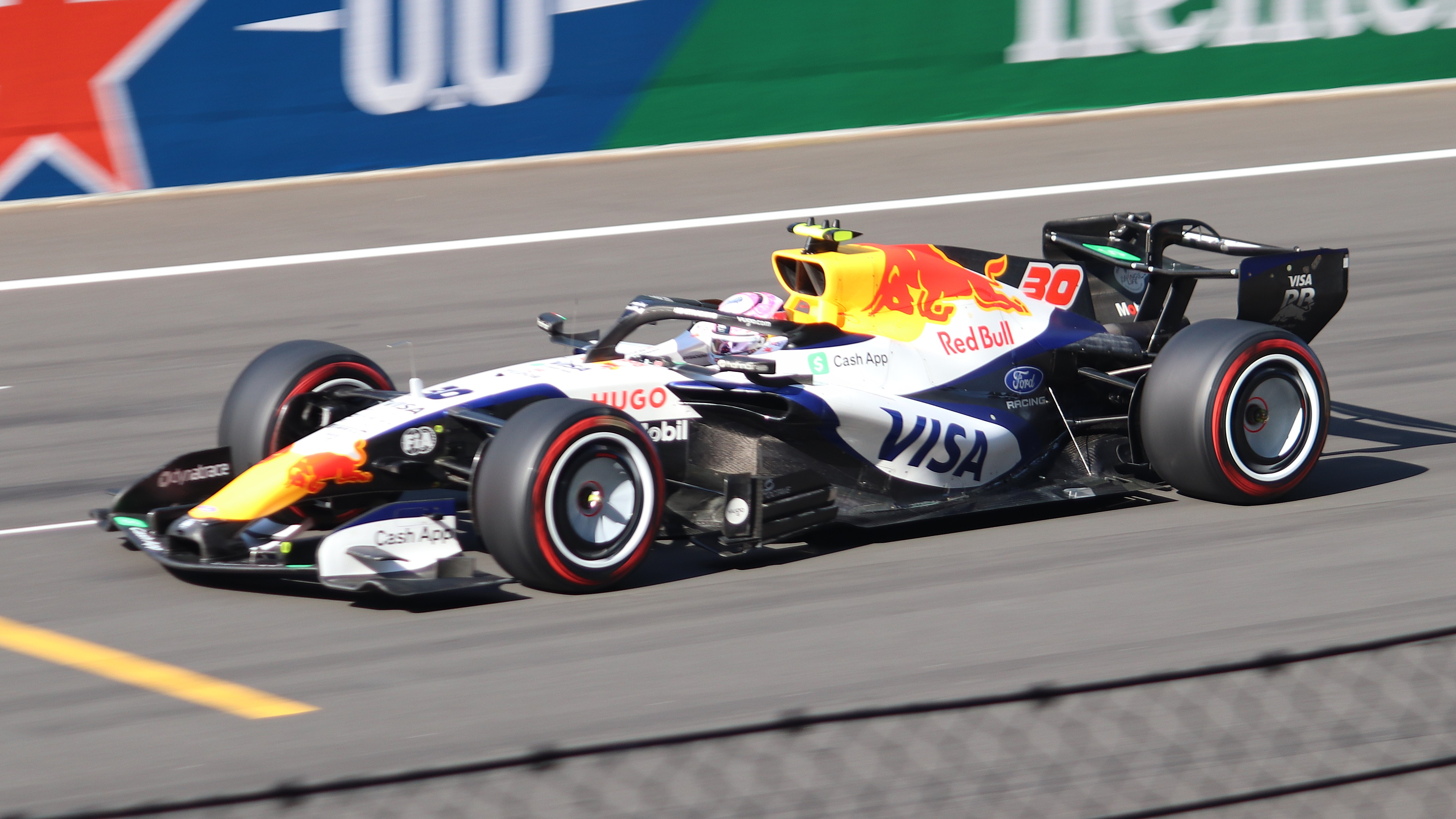
Lawson at the 2026 Chinese Grand Prix

Lawson remained at Racing Bulls in 2026, partnered by rookie Arvid Lindblad. In the second round of the 2026 season he brought home eight points by finishing in seventh place in both the sprint and main race for his first points of the season. He continued this strong form taking ninth in the Japanese Grand Prix, and following a retirement in Miami, he was able to finish seventh in Canada equalling his best result of the season. At the subsequent Monaco Grand Prix, he initially equalled his career best result in Formula One achieving a fifth place finish. However Pierre Gasly was later reinstated onto the podium after his penalties were successfully appealed and removed, dropping Lawson to sixth. Lawson continued to score points at the next three races, with an eighth place finish at Barcelona-Catalunya, a ninth place finish in Austria, and a sixth place finish at Silverstone. He placed eighth again at the Hungarian Grand Prix.

Lawson returned to Red Bull Racing for the Dutch Grand Prix replacing Hadjar who broke his wrist during the summer break. He finished eleventh in the sprint race, and seventh in the main race after incurring a ten-second penalty for ignoring yellow flags. He remained with Red Bull Racing for the Italian Grand Prix, where he finished fourteenth after being impeded during qualifying, and for the Spanish Grand Prix, where he finished in sixth. Lawson subsequently returned to Racing Bulls at the Azerbaijan Grand Prix, in which he finished twelfth after contact from Lindblad turned him around late in the race. This was followed by a seventh-place finish at both the Bahrain Grand Prix and the Singapore Grand Prix, a ninth-place finish at the United States Grand Prix, and another seventh-place classification in Mexico despite starting from the pitlane.

==== 2027 ====
On 12 November 2026, it was confirmed that Lawson would continue to drive for Racing Bulls alongside Lindblad in 2027.

== Other racing ==
=== Deutsche Tourenwagen Masters (2021) ===
Lawson competed in the Deutsche Tourenwagen Masters (DTM) in 2021, driving a Red Bull-sponsored Ferrari 488 GT3 for AF Corse alongside Formula One reserve driver Alex Albon. He competed in the championship concurrently with his rookie Formula 2 campaign. Lawson made an immediate impact on his debut in Monza, winning the opening race. In doing so, he became the youngest-ever race winner in the DTM history. After a spin in the second Monza race costed him a points finish, he finished second in both races at the Lausitzring, leading the second race before losing the win due to an issue during his pit stop. Following a challenging mid-season run in which he failed to score points in three of the next four races, Lawson returned to winning form at the Red Bull Ring. He secured his first pole position and later converted into his second victory during the opening race. The following day, Lawson claimed another win after starting second, strengthening his title challenge.

Lawson continued to score consistently in the latter stages of the season, recording four podium finishes and a fourth-place finish over the next five races, Heading into the final race at the Norisring, he qualified on pole position and led the drivers' championship by 19 points over Kelvin van der Linde, with Maximilian Götz a further three points adrift of van der Linde. However, Lawson's championship unravelled at the start when contact with van der Linde on the opening lap damaged his car, which left him lapping significantly off the pace after rejoining. Furthermore, Mercedes team orders to Lucas Auer and Philip Ellis enabled Götz to move into the lead and secure the victory, putting him three points ahead of Lawson. Van der Linde was later given a five-second penalty for his involvement in the opening-lap incident. Lawson finished the season runner-up in the drivers' championship. Following the conclusion of the campaign, he expressed his dissatisfaction of the title outcome, stating that van der Linde was "the dirtiest guy [he's] ever raced against." Lawson also stated that he no longer intended to remain in the series.

=== Super Formula (2023) ===
Lawson left Formula 2 at the end of 2022 and contested the 2023 Super Formula Championship with reigning champions Team Mugen alongside two-time drivers' champion Tomoki Nojiri. He made an immediate impression, qualifying third for his series debut in Fuji and becoming the first driver to win on their Japanese Top Formula debut since 1978. In the second race, Lawson ran in third, but a safety car infringement penalty demoted him to fifth. In Suzuka, he qualified ninth but recovered strongly to finish fourth. In Autopolis, he qualified second while teammate Nojiri was sidelined due to a collapsed lung, Lawson managed to undercut polesitter Sho Tsuboi during the pit cycle and resisted a late charge from Ritomo Miyata to secure the win, moving him into the championship lead. A more difficult weekend followed in Sugo, qualifying sixth. A radio miscommunication during the race limited Lawson to fifth, allowing Miyata to take a 12-point lead in the standings. Lawson responded decisively in the second Fuji round, claiming his second win and closing the championship deficit to a single point.

In Motegi, Lawson qualified third, scoring a point and briefly taking the championship lead. However, he spun at the while attempting to pass Nojiri, triggering a multi-car pileup which red-flagged the race. A subsequent drive-through penalty for work carried out on his car under red-flag conditions left him classified thirteenth. Lawson praised his team's efforts in repairing his car in time for the restart. Heading into the Suzuka double-header finale, Lawson trailed Miyata by eight points. He qualified seventh for the opening race but an early red flag confined him to sixth. Lawson then took his first and only pole of the season for the second race. He lost the lead to Kakunoshin Ota at the start and ultimately finished second. Lawson concluded the season runner-up in the standings recording one pole, three wins, four podiums and 106.5 points.

Lawson did not continue in Super Formula for 2024, opting to focus full-time on his reserve driver commitments, and was replaced in his seat by Ayumu Iwasa.

== Karting record ==
=== Karting career summary ===
Season	Series	Team	Position
2011	Kartsport NZ Schools Championship — Cadet		13th
2011	Kartsport NZ National Sprint Championship — Cadet		12th
2011	NZ Top Half Series — Cadet		
2011	Kartsport Auckland City of Sails — Cadet Raket		
2011	Blossom Festival — Cadet		3rd
2012	Kartsport NZ Schools Championship — 100cc Junior Restricted		8th
2012	Kartsport NZ National Sprint Championship — Cadet		3rd
2012	Kartsport NZ North Island Sprint Championship — 100cc Junior Restricted		6th
2012	NZ Top Half Series — 100cc Junior Yamaha		7th
2012	NZ Top Half Series — Cadet		21st
2012	Kartsport Auckland City of Sails — Cadet Raket		5th
2012	CIK Trophy of New Zealand Challenge Cup — Cadet		1st
2013	Kartsport NZ Schools Championship — 100cc Junior Restricted		2nd
2013	Kartsport NZ National Sprint Championship — 100cc Junior Restricted Yamaha		5th
2013	Kartsport NZ North Island Sprint Championship — 100cc Junior Restricted		4th
2013	NZ Top Half Series — 100cc Junior Yamaha		10th
2013	Kartsport Auckland City of Sails — 100cc Junior Restricted		4th
2014	Kartsport NZ Schools Championship — 100cc Junior Restricted		1st
2014	Kartsport NZ National Sprint Championship — 100cc Junior Restricted Yamaha		1st
2014	Kartsport NZ North Island Sprint Championship — Rotax Junior		7th
2014	NZ Top Half Series — 100cc Junior Yamaha		
2014	Blossom Festival — Rotax Junior		1st
2014	Kartsport Auckland City of Sails — 100cc Junior Restricted		3rd
2015	Kartsport NZ National Sprint Championship — Rotax Junior		3rd
2015	Kartsport NZ National Sprint Championship — 100cc Junior Restricted Yamaha		11th
2015	NZ Top Half Series — Formula Junior		
2021	Kartsport Auckland City of Sails — Rotax Light	Josh Hart Racing	1st
2021	Kartsport Auckland City of Sails — DD2	Josh Hart Racing	1st
2022	Kartsport Auckland City of Sails — KZ2		17th
2022	CIK Trophy of New Zealand — KZ2		11th
2023	Kartsport Auckland City of Sails — KZ2	IKS	1st
2023	CIK Trophy of New Zealand — KZ2	IKS	3rd
2023	Hampton Downs Racing Academy - Kartstars New Zealand — KZ2		16th

== Racing record ==
=== Racing career summary ===
Season	Series	Team	Races	Wins	Poles	F/Laps	Podiums	Points	Position
2015	Formula First Manfeild Winter Series	Sabre Motorsport	12	1	1	1	10	631	**2nd**
2015–16	New Zealand Formula First Championship	Sabre Motorsport	24	1	0	1	3	1028	6th
2016–17	NZ F1600 Championship Series	Liam Lawson Motorsport	15	14	5	12	15	605	**1st**
2017	Australian Formula 4 Championship	Team BRM	21	5	1	1	12	300	**2nd**
2017	Victorian Formula Vee Championship	JRD	3	0	0	0	1	60	15th
2017	Mazda Road to Indy Shootout	Lucas Oil School of Racing	1	0	0	0	0	—N/a	Finalist
2018	ADAC Formula 4 Championship	Van Amersfoort Racing	20	3	3	0	9	234	**2nd**
2018	F3 Asian Championship	Pinnacle Motorsport	3	3	2	3	3	75	8th
2019	FIA Formula 3 Championship	MP Motorsport	16	0	0	0	2	41	11th
2019	Macau Grand Prix	MP Motorsport	1	0	0	0	0	—N/a	7th
2019	Euroformula Open Championship	Motopark	14	4	2	1	7	179	**2nd**
2019	Toyota Racing Series	M2 Competition	15	5	4	5	11	356	**1st**
2020	FIA Formula 3 Championship	Hitech Grand Prix	18	3	1	1	6	143	5th
2020	Toyota Racing Series	M2 Competition	15	5	4	7	10	356	**2nd**
2021	FIA Formula 2 Championship	Hitech Grand Prix	23	1	1	2	3	103	9th
2021	Deutsche Tourenwagen Masters	Red Bull AF Corse	16	3	4	1	10	227	**2nd**
2022	FIA Formula 2 Championship	Carlin	28	4	0	3	10	149	**3rd**
2022	Formula One	Scuderia AlphaTauri	Test/Reserve driver						
2022	Formula One	Oracle Red Bull Racing	Test/Reserve driver						
2023	Super Formula	Team Mugen	9	3	1	2	4	106.5	**2nd**
2023	Formula One	Scuderia AlphaTauri	5	0	0	0	0	2	20th
2023	Formula One	Oracle Red Bull Racing	Reserve driver						
2024	Formula One	Visa Cash App RB F1 Team	6	0	0	0	0	4	21st
2024	Formula One	Oracle Red Bull Racing	Reserve driver						
2025	Formula One	Oracle Red Bull Racing	2	0	0	0	0	38	14th
2025	Formula One	Visa Cash App Racing Bulls F1 Team	22	0	0	0	0	38	14th
2026	Formula One	Visa Cash App Racing Bulls F1 Team	18	0	0	1	0	89*	9th*
2026	Formula One	Oracle Red Bull Racing	3	0	0	0	0	89*	9th*

* Season still in progress.

=== Complete Australian Formula 4 Championship results ===
(key) (Races in bold indicate pole position; races in italics indicate points for the fastest lap of top ten finishers)

Year	Entrant	1	2	3	4	5	6	7	8	9	10	11	12	13	14	15	16	17	18	19	20	21	DC	Points
2017	Team BRM	SAN1; 1; 2	SAN1; 2; 2	**SAN1**; **3**; 1	SAN2; 1; 1	SAN2; 2; 2	SAN2; 3; 2	BAR; 1; 3	BAR; 2; 1	BAR; 3; 9	PHI; 1; 3	PHI; 2; 10	PHI; 3; 7	QLD; 1; 10	QLD; 2; 4	QLD; 3; 6	SYD; 1; 6	SYD; 2; 6	SYD; 3; 3	SUR; 1; 1	SUR; 2; 4	SUR; 3; 1	2nd	300

=== Complete ADAC Formula 4 Championship results ===
(key) (Races in bold indicate pole position; races in italics indicate points for the fastest lap of top ten finishers)

Year	Entrant	1	2	3	4	5	6	7	8	9	10	11	12	13	14	15	16	17	18	19	20	DC	Points
2018	Van Amersfoort Racing	OSC; 1; 3	OSC; 2; 17	OSC; 3; 17	HOC1; 1; 2	HOC1; 2; 2	HOC1; 3; 6	LAU; 1; 1	LAU; 2; 2	LAU; 3; 1	RBR; 1; 3	RBR; 2; 6	RBR; 3; 1	HOC2; 1; 2	**HOC2**; **2**; 18	NÜR; 1; 6	NÜR; 2; 15	NÜR; 3; 14	**HOC3**; **1**; 2	**HOC3**; **2**; 3	HOC3; 3; 16	2nd	234

=== Complete Toyota Racing Series results ===
(key) (Races in bold indicate pole position; races in italics indicate points for the fastest lap of top ten finishers)

Year	Entrant	1	2	3	4	5	6	7	8	9	10	11	12	13	14	15	16	17	DC	Points
2019	M2 Competition	HIG; 1; 1	HIG; 2; 5	HIG; 3; 1	**TER**; **1**; 2	TER; 2 C	TER; 3 C	HMP; 1; 7	HMP; 2; 3	HMP; 3; 1	HMP; 4 Ret	**TAU**; **1**; 1	**TAU**; **2**; 2	TAU; 3; 3	TAU; 4; 3	**MAN**; **1**; 2	MAN; 2; 5	MAN; 3; 1	1st	356
2020	M2 Competition	HIG; 1; 1	HIG; 2; 5	**HIG**; **3**; 1	**TER**; **1**; 6	TER; 2; 3	TER; 3; 1	HMP; 1; 2	HMP; 2; 2	HMP; 3 Ret	**PUK**; **1**; 1	PUK; 2; 4	**PUK**; **3**; 1	MAN; 1; 2	MAN; 2; 5	**MAN**; **3**; 3			2nd	356

=== Complete New Zealand Grand Prix results ===
Year	Team	Car	Qualifying	Main race
2019	(New Zealand) M2 Competition	Tatuus FT-50 - Toyota	2nd	**1st**
2020	(New Zealand) M2 Competition	Tatuus FT-50 - Toyota	3rd	**3rd**

=== Complete Euroformula Open Championship results ===
(key) (Races in bold indicate pole position; races in italics indicate points for the fastest lap of top ten finishers)

Year	Entrant	1	2	3	4	5	6	7	8	9	10	11	12	13	14	15	16	17	18	DC	Points
2019	Team Motopark	LEC; 1; 1	**LEC**; **2**; 4	**PAU**; **1**; 1	PAU; 2 Ret	HOC; 1; 3	HOC; 2; 5	SPA; 1; 3	SPA; 2 Ret	HUN; 1; 3	HUN; 2; 10	RBR; 1	RBR; 2	SIL; 1	SIL; 2	CAT; 1; 1	CAT; 2; 6	MNZ; 1 Ret	MNZ; 2; 1	2nd	179

=== Complete FIA Formula 3 Championship results ===
(key) (Races in bold indicate pole position; races in italics indicate points for the fastest lap of top ten finishers)

Year	Entrant	1	2	3	4	5	6	7	8	9	10	11	12	13	14	15	16	17	18	DC	Points
2019	MP Motorsport	CAT; FEA; NC	CAT; SPR; 17	LEC; FEA; 9	LEC; SPR; 5	RBR; FEA; 14	RBR; SPR; 25	SIL; FEA; 8	SIL; SPR; 3	HUN; FEA; 16	HUN; SPR; 9	SPA; FEA; 12	SPA; SPR; 19	MNZ; FEA; 7	MNZ; SPR; 2	SOC; FEA; 18	SOC; SPR; 8			11th	41
2020	Hitech Grand Prix	RBR; FEA; 6	RBR; SPR; 1	RBR^{‡} FEA; 8	RBR; SPR; Ret	HUN; FEA; Ret	HUN; SPR; Ret	SIL; FEA; 1	SIL; SPR; 4	SIL; FEA; 3	SIL; SPR; 5	CAT; FEA; 2	CAT; SPR; 7	SPA; FEA; 9	SPA; SPR; 3	**MNZ**; **FEA**; 6	MNZ; SPR; 7	MUG; FEA; 10	MUG; SPR; 1	5th	143

^{‡} Half points were awarded, as less than 75% of the scheduled distance was completed.

=== Complete Macau Grand Prix results ===
Year	Team	Car	Qualifying	Quali race	Main race
2019	(Netherlands) MP Motorsport	Dallara F3 2019	15th	20th	7th

=== Complete FIA Formula 2 Championship results ===
(key) (Races in bold indicate pole position) (Races in italics indicate points for the fastest lap of top ten finishers)

Year	Entrant	1	2	3	4	5	6	7	8	9	10	11	12	13	14	15	16	17	18	19	20	21	22	23	24	25	26	27	28	DC	Points
2021	Hitech Grand Prix	BHR; SP1; 1	BHR; SP2; Ret	BHR; FEA; 3	MCO; SP1; 9	MCO; SP2; DSQ	MCO; FEA; 7	BAK; SP1; Ret	BAK; SP2; 7	**BAK**; **FEA**; 6	SIL; SP1; 7	SIL; SP2; 5	SIL; FEA; 11	MNZ; SP1; 5	MNZ; SP2; 4	MNZ; FEA; Ret	SOC; SP1; Ret	SOC; SP2; C	SOC; FEA; 7	JED; SP1; 2	JED; SP2; Ret	JED; FEA; 9‡	YMC; SP1; 5	YMC; SP2; 6	YMC; FEA; 20†					9th	103
2022	Carlin	BHR; SPR; 3	BHR; FEA; 2	JED; SPR; 1	JED; FEA; Ret	IMO; SPR; 8	IMO; FEA; Ret	CAT; SPR; 9	CAT; FEA; 9	MCO; SPR; 8	MCO; FEA; Ret	BAK; SPR; 3	BAK; FEA; 15	SIL; SPR; 20	SIL; FEA; 3	RBR; SPR; Ret	RBR; FEA; 10	LEC; SPR; 1	LEC; FEA; 6	HUN; SPR; 6	HUN; FEA; 7	SPA; SPR; 1	SPA; FEA; 3	ZAN; SPR; 4	ZAN; FEA; 12	MNZ; SPR; 5	MNZ; FEA; 13	YMC; SPR; 1	YMC; FEA; 3	3rd	149

^{‡} Half points awarded as less than 75% of race distance was completed.
^{†} Driver did not finish the race, but were classified, as they completed more than 90% of the race distance.

=== Complete Deutsche Tourenwagen Masters results ===
(key) (Races in bold indicate pole position) (Races in italics indicate fastest lap)

Year	Team	Car	1	2	3	4	5	6	7	8	9	10	11	12	13	14	15	16	Pos	Points
2021	Red Bull AF Corse	Ferrari 488 GT3 Evo 2020	MNZ; 1; 1	MNZ; 2; 13^{2}	LAU; 1; 2	LAU; 2; 2^{2}	ZOL; 1 Ret	ZOL; 2; 3	NÜR; 1; 13	NÜR; 2 Ret	**RBR**; **1**; 1^{1}	RBR; 2; 1^{2}	**ASS**; **1**; 3^{1}	ASS; 2; 2^{3}	HOC; 1; 4^{3}	HOC; 2; 2	**NOR**; **1**; 3^{1}	**NOR**; **2** NC^{1}	2nd	227

=== Complete Super Formula results ===
(key) (Races in bold indicate pole position; races in italics indicate fastest lap)

Year	Team	Engine	1	2	3	4	5	6	7	8	9	DC	Points
2023	Team Mugen	Honda	FUJ; 1^{3}	FUJ; 5	SUZ; 4	AUT; 1^{2}	SUG; 5	FUJ; 1^{2}	MOT; 13^{3}	SUZ; 6‡	**SUZ**; 2^{1}	2nd	106.5

^{‡} Half points awarded as less than 75% of race distance was completed.

=== Complete Formula One results ===
(key) (Races in bold indicate pole position; races in italics indicate fastest lap)

Year	Entrant	Chassis	Engine	1	2	3	4	5	6	7	8	9	10	11	12	13	14	15	16	17	18	19	20	21	22	23	24	WDC	Points
2022	Scuderia AlphaTauri	AlphaTauri AT03	Red Bull RBPTH001 1.6 V6 t	BHR	SAU	AUS	EMI	MIA	ESP	MON	AZE	CAN	GBR	AUT	FRA	HUN	BEL; TD	NED	ITA	SIN	JPN	USA	MXC; TD	SAP				–	–
2022	Oracle Red Bull Racing	Red Bull Racing RB18	Red Bull RBPTH001 1.6 V6 t																						ABU; TD			–	–
2023	Scuderia AlphaTauri	AlphaTauri AT04	Honda RBPTH001 1.6 V6 t	BHR	SAU	AUS	AZE	MIA	MON	ESP	CAN	AUT	GBR	HUN	BEL	NED; 13	ITA; 11	SIN; 9	JPN; 11	QAT; 17	USA	MXC	SAP	LVG	ABU			20th	2
2024	Visa Cash App RB F1 Team	RB VCARB 01	Honda RBPTH002 1.6 V6 t	BHR	SAU	AUS	JPN	CHN	MIA	EMI	MON	CAN	ESP	AUT	GBR	HUN	BEL	NED	ITA	AZE	SIN	USA; 9	MXC; 16	SAP; 9	LVG; 16	QAT; 14	ABU; 17†	21st	4
2025	Oracle Red Bull Racing	Red Bull Racing RB21	Honda RBPTH003 1.6 V6 t	AUS; Ret	CHN; 12																							14th	38
2025	Visa Cash App Racing Bulls F1 Team	Racing Bulls VCARB 02	Honda RBPTH003 1.6 V6 t			JPN; 17	BHR; 16	SAU; 12	MIA; Ret	EMI; 14	MON; 8	ESP; 11	CAN; Ret	AUT; 6	GBR; Ret	BEL; 8	HUN; 8	NED; 12	ITA; 14	AZE; 5	SIN; 15	USA; 11	MXC; Ret	SAP; 7	LVG; 14	QAT; 9	ABU; 18	14th	38
2026	Visa Cash App Racing Bulls F1 Team	Racing Bulls VCARB 03	Red Bull Ford DM01 1.6 V6 t	AUS; 13	CHN; 7^{7}	JPN; 9	MIA; Ret	CAN; 7	MON; 5	BCN; 8	AUT; 9	GBR; 6^{8}	BEL; 12	HUN; 8				AZE; 12	BHR; 7	SIN; 7^{5}	USA; 9	MXC; 7	SAP; 7	LVG; 14	QAT	ABU		9th*	89*
2026	Oracle Red Bull Racing	Red Bull Racing RB22	Red Bull Ford DM01 1.6 V6 t												NED; 7	ITA; 14	ESP; 6											9th*	89*

^{†} Did not finish, but was classified as he had completed more than 90% of the race distance.
* Season still in progress.

== Notes ==
Sporting positions
Preceded by Michael Scott	NZ F1600 Championship Series; Champion; 2016–17	Succeeded by Callum Hedge
Preceded by Robert Shwartzman	Toyota Racing Series; Champion; 2019	Succeeded by Igor Fraga
Preceded by Richard Verschoor	New Zealand Grand Prix; Winner; 2019	Succeeded by Igor Fraga
Preceded by Ren Sato	Super Formula; Rookie Champion; 2023	Succeeded by Ayumu Iwasa
