= 2022 Lausitzring DTM round =

Motor racing competition

(Germany) 2022 DTM Lausitzring round
Round details
- Round 2 of 8 rounds in the 2022 Deutsche Tourenwagen Masters season
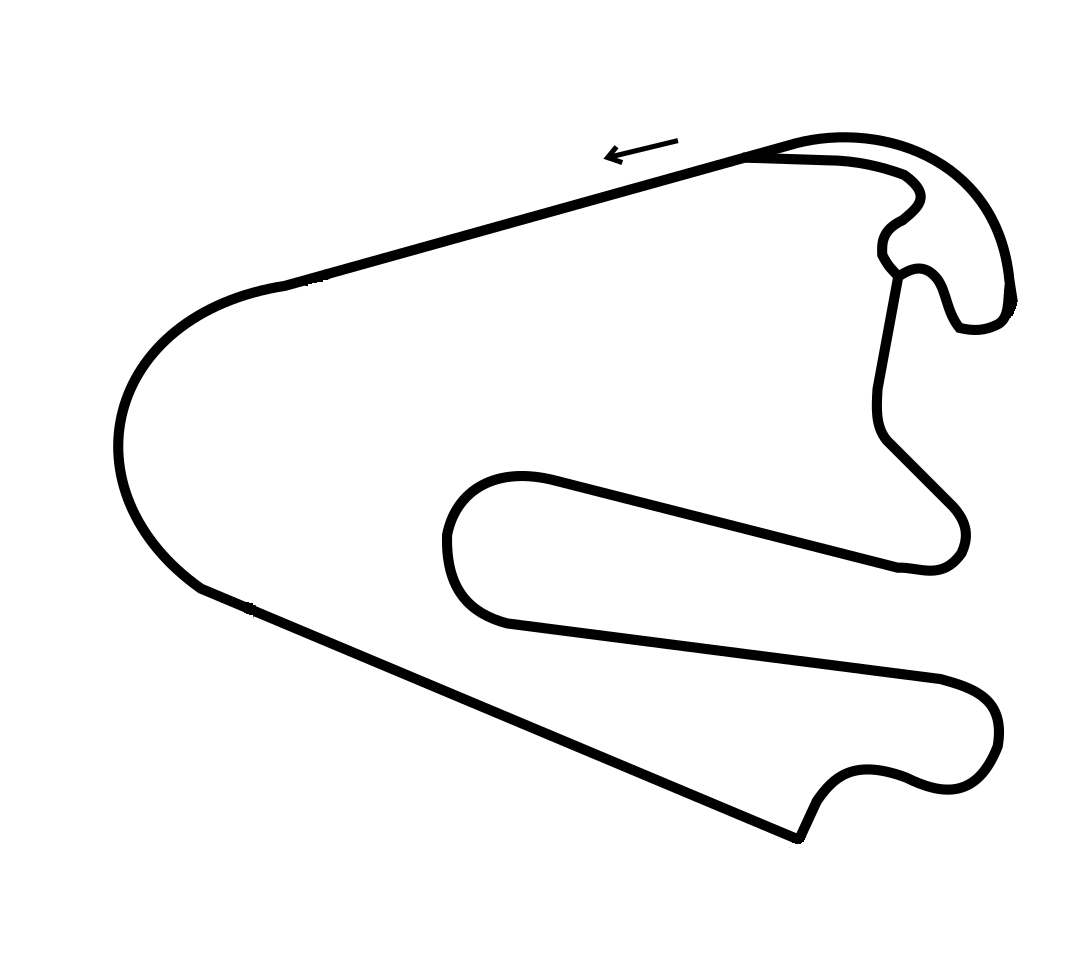
- Location: Lausitzring, Klettwitz, Germany
- Course: Permanent racing facility 4.601 km (2.860 mi)

Deutsche Tourenwagen Masters

Race 1
- Date: 21 May 2022
- Laps: 36

Pole position
Driver	(Austria) Lucas Auer	Mercedes-AMG Team Winward
- Time: 1:30.654

Podium
First	(South Africa) Sheldon van der Linde	Schubert Motorsport
Second	(Germany) Luca Stolz	Mercedes-AMG Team HRT
Third	(Austria) Lucas Auer	Mercedes-AMG Team Winward

Fastest lap
Driver	(South Africa) Sheldon van der Linde	Schubert Motorsport
- Time: 1:32.565 (on lap 11)

Race 2
- Date: 22 May 2022
- Laps: 36

Pole position
Driver	(South Africa) Sheldon van der Linde	Schubert Motorsport

Podium
Second	(Germany) Maro Engel	Mercedes-AMG Team GruppeM Racing
Third	(Germany) René Rast	Team Abt

Fastest lap
Driver	(Germany) Maro Engel	Mercedes-AMG Team GruppeM Racing
- Time: 1:32.085 (on lap 12)

The 2022 Lausitzring DTM round was a motor racing event for the Deutsche Tourenwagen Masters held between 21–22 May 2022. The event, part of the 36th season of the DTM, was held at the Lausitzring in Germany.

For this round, the alternate (and much faster) 4.601 km (2.860 mi) version of the full Grand Prix course was used with Turn 1 being the banked oval turn instead of the usual sharp left turn after the pits.

== Results ==
=== Race 1 ===
==== Qualifying ====
Pos.	No.	Driver	Team	Car	Time	Gap	Grid	Pts
1	22	(Austria) Lucas Auer	Mercedes-AMG Team Winward	Mercedes-AMG GT3 Evo	1:30.654		1	3
2	31	(South Africa) Sheldon van der Linde	Schubert Motorsport	BMW M4 GT3	1:30.679	+0.025	2	2
3	88	(Germany) Maro Engel	Mercedes-AMG Team GruppeM Racing	Mercedes-AMG GT3 Evo	1:30.721	+0.067	3	1
4	4	(Germany) Luca Stolz	Mercedes-AMG Team HRT	Mercedes-AMG GT3 Evo	1:30.864	+0.210	4	
5	74	(Brazil) Felipe Fraga	Red Bull AF Corse	Ferrari 488 GT3 Evo 2020	1:30.971	+0.317	5	
6	36	(India) Arjun Maini	Mercedes-AMG Team HRT	Mercedes-AMG GT3 Evo	1:30.987	+0.333	6	
7	25	(Austria) Philipp Eng	Schubert Motorsport	BMW M4 GT3	1:31.118	+0.464	7	
8	7	(Switzerland) Ricardo Feller	Team Abt Sportsline	Audi R8 LMS Evo II	1:31.147	+0.493	8	
9	63	(Italy) Mirko Bortolotti	GRT	Lamborghini Huracán GT3 Evo	1:31.147	+0.493	9	
10	33	(Germany) René Rast	Team Abt	Audi R8 LMS Evo II	1:31.148	+0.494	10	
11	94	(Norway) Dennis Olsen	SSR Performance	Porsche 911 GT3 R	1:31.159	+0.505	11	
12	37	(New Zealand) Nick Cassidy	AlphaTauri AF Corse	Ferrari 488 GT3 Evo 2020	1:31.172	+0.518	12	
13	1	(Germany) Maximilian Götz	Mercedes-AMG Team Winward Racing	Mercedes-AMG GT3 Evo	1:31.184	+0.530	13	
14	51	(Switzerland) Nico Müller	Team Rosberg	Audi R8 LMS Evo II	1:31.302	+0.648	14	
15	55	(Canada) Mikaël Grenier	Mercedes-AMG Team GruppeM Racing	Mercedes-AMG GT3 Evo	1:31.304	+0.650	15	
16	11	(Germany) Marco Wittmann	Walkenhorst Motorsport	BMW M4 GT3	1:31.397	+0.743	16	
17	27	(Germany) David Schumacher	Mercedes-AMG Team Winward	Mercedes-AMG GT3 Evo	1:31.437	+0.783	17	
18	18	(Germany) Maximilian Buhk	Mercedes-AMG Team Mücke Motorsport	Mercedes-AMG GT3 Evo	1:31.461	+0.807	18	
19	3	(South Africa) Kelvin van der Linde	Team Abt Sportsline	Audi R8 LMS Evo II	1:31.528	+0.874	19	
20	24	(Austria) Thomas Preining	KÜS Team Bernhard	Porsche 911 GT3 R	1:31.540	+0.886	20	
21	10	(Germany) Esteban Muth	Walkenhorst Motorsport	BMW M4 GT3	1:31.575	+0.921	21	
22	92	(Belgium) Laurens Vanthoor	SSR Performance	Porsche 911 GT3 R	1:31.666	+1.012	22	
23	95	(Denmark) Nicki Thiim	T3 Motorsport	Lamborghini Huracán GT3 Evo	1:31.799	+1.145	23	
24	12	(United States) Dev Gore	Team Rosberg	Audi R8 LMS Evo II	1:31.806	+1.152	24	
25	66	(Germany) Marius Zug	Attempto Racing	Audi R8 LMS Evo II	1:31.812	+1.158	25	
26	19	(Switzerland) Rolf Ineichen	GRT	Lamborghini Huracán GT3 Evo	1:32.220	+1.566	26	
27	85	(Austria) Clemens Schmid	GRT Grasser Racing.com	Lamborghini Huracán GT3 Evo	1:32.483	+1.829	27	
28	26	(United Kingdom) Esmee Hawkey	T3 Motorsport	Lamborghini Huracán GT3 Evo	1:33.252	+2.598	28	
29	6	(Italy) Alessio Deledda	GRT Grasser Racing.com	Lamborghini Huracán GT3 Evo	1:34.366	+3.712	29	

==== Race ====
Pos	No.	Driver	Team	Car	Laps	Time / Retired	Grid	Pts
1	31	(South Africa) Sheldon van der Linde	Schubert Motorsport	BMW M4 GT3	36	56:48.270	2	25
2	4	(Germany) Luca Stolz	Mercedes-AMG Team HRT	Mercedes-AMG GT3 Evo	36	+3.590	4	18
3	22	(Austria) Lucas Auer	Mercedes-AMG Team Winward	Mercedes-AMG GT3 Evo	36	+5.427	1	15
4	36	(India) Arjun Maini	Mercedes-AMG Team HRT	Mercedes-AMG GT3 Evo	36	+7.752	6	12
5	88	(Germany) Maro Engel	Mercedes-AMG Team GruppeM Racing	Mercedes-AMG GT3 Evo	36	+9.142	3	10
6	63	(Italy) Mirko Bortolotti	GRT	Lamborghini Huracán GT3 Evo	36	+13.654	9	8
7	92	(Belgium) Laurens Vanthoor	SSR Performance	Porsche 911 GT3 R	36	+17.577	22	6
8	33	(Germany) René Rast	Team Abt	Audi R8 LMS Evo II	36	+19.056	10	4
9	37	(New Zealand) Nick Cassidy	AlphaTauri AF Corse	Ferrari 488 GT3 Evo 2020	36	+19.303	12	2
10	1	(Germany) Maximilian Götz	Mercedes-AMG Team Winward Racing	Mercedes-AMG GT3 Evo	36	+21.425	13	1
11	18	(Germany) Maximilian Buhk	Mercedes-AMG Team Mücke Motorsport	Mercedes-AMG GT3 Evo	36	+22.949	18	
12	10	(Germany) Esteban Muth	Walkenhorst Motorsport	BMW M4 GT3	36	+34.430	21	
13	95	(Denmark) Nicki Thiim	T3 Motorsport	Lamborghini Huracán GT3 Evo	36	+37.064	23	
14	19	(Switzerland) Rolf Ineichen	GRT	Lamborghini Huracán GT3 Evo	36	+38.253	26	
15	66	(Germany) Marius Zug	Attempto Racing	Audi R8 LMS Evo II	36	+41.256	25	
16	12	(United States) Dev Gore	Team Rosberg	Audi R8 LMS Evo II	36	+49.533	24	
17	85	(Austria) Clemens Schmid	GRT Grasser Racing.com	Lamborghini Huracán GT3 Evo	36	+49.820	27	
18	26	(United Kingdom) Esmee Hawkey	T3 Motorsport	Lamborghini Huracán GT3 Evo	36	+1:20.599	28	
19	6	(Italy) Alessio Deledda	GRT Grasser Racing.com	Lamborghini Huracán GT3 Evo	35	+1 lap	29	
Ret	24	(Austria) Thomas Preining	KÜS Team Bernhard	Porsche 911 GT3 R	29	retired	20	
Ret	51	(Switzerland) Nico Müller	Team Rosberg	Audi R8 LMS Evo II	26	retired	14	
Ret	94	(Norway) Dennis Olsen	SSR Performance	Porsche 911 GT3 R	25	retired	11	
Ret	55	(Canada) Mikaël Grenier	Mercedes-AMG Team GruppeM Racing	Mercedes-AMG GT3 Evo	25	retired	15	
Ret	11	(Germany) Marco Wittmann	Walkenhorst Motorsport	BMW M4 GT3	25	retired	16	
Ret	27	(Germany) David Schumacher	Mercedes-AMG Team Winward	Mercedes-AMG GT3 Evo	23	retired	17	
Ret	74	(Brazil) Felipe Fraga	Red Bull AF Corse	Ferrari 488 GT3 Evo 2020	22	retired	5	
Ret	7	(Switzerland) Ricardo Feller	Team Abt Sportsline	Audi R8 LMS Evo II	15	retired	8	
Ret	3	(South Africa) Kelvin van der Linde	Team Abt Sportsline	Audi R8 LMS Evo II	14	retired	19	
Ret	25	(Austria) Philipp Eng	Schubert Motorsport	BMW M4 GT3	11	retired	7	
Fastest lap set by Sheldon van der Linde: 1:32.565

=== Race 2 ===
==== Qualifying ====
Pos.	No.	Driver	Team	Car	Time	Gap	Grid	Pts
1	31	(South Africa) Sheldon van der Linde	Schubert Motorsport	BMW M4 GT3	1:30.998		1	3
2	33	(Germany) René Rast	Team Abt	Audi R8 LMS Evo II	1:31.106	+0.108	2	2
3	88	(Germany) Maro Engel	Mercedes-AMG Team GruppeM Racing	Mercedes-AMG GT3 Evo	1:31.152	+0.154	3	1
4	63	(Italy) Mirko Bortolotti	GRT	Lamborghini Huracán GT3 Evo	1:31.159	+0.161	4	
5	7	(Switzerland) Ricardo Feller	Team Abt Sportsline	Audi R8 LMS Evo II	1:31.174	+0.176	5	
6	51	(Switzerland) Nico Müller	Team Rosberg	Audi R8 LMS Evo II	1:31.229	+0.231	6	
7	37	(New Zealand) Nick Cassidy	AlphaTauri AF Corse	Ferrari 488 GT3 Evo 2020	1:31.284	+0.286	7	
8	4	(Germany) Luca Stolz	Mercedes-AMG Team HRT	Mercedes-AMG GT3 Evo	1:31.336	+0.338	8	
9	22	(Austria) Lucas Auer	Mercedes-AMG Team Winward	Mercedes-AMG GT3 Evo	1:31.361	+0.363	9	
10	27	(Germany) David Schumacher	Mercedes-AMG Team Winward	Mercedes-AMG GT3 Evo	1:31.361	+0.363	10	
11	25	(Austria) Philipp Eng	Schubert Motorsport	BMW M4 GT3	1:31.376	+0.378	11	
12	11	(Germany) Marco Wittmann	Walkenhorst Motorsport	BMW M4 GT3	1:31.391	+0.393	12	
13	94	(Norway) Dennis Olsen	SSR Performance	Porsche 911 GT3 R	1:31.409	+0.411	13	
14	36	(India) Arjun Maini	Mercedes-AMG Team HRT	Mercedes-AMG GT3 Evo	1:31.443	+0.445	14	
15	3	(South Africa) Kelvin van der Linde	Team Abt Sportsline	Audi R8 LMS Evo II	1:31.451	+0.453	15	
16	55	(Canada) Mikaël Grenier	Mercedes-AMG Team GruppeM Racing	Mercedes-AMG GT3 Evo	1:31.487	+0.489	16	
17	92	(Belgium) Laurens Vanthoor	SSR Performance	Porsche 911 GT3 R	1:31.510	+0.512	17	
18	24	(Austria) Thomas Preining	KÜS Team Bernhard	Porsche 911 GT3 R	1:31.512	+0.514	18	
19	1	(Germany) Maximilian Götz	Mercedes-AMG Team Winward	Mercedes-AMG GT3 Evo	1:31.568	+0.570	19	
20	10	(Germany) Esteban Muth	Walkenhorst Motorsport	BMW M4 GT3	1:31.599	+0.601	20	
21	18	(Germany) Maximilian Buhk	Mercedes-AMG Team Mücke Motorsport	Mercedes-AMG GT3 Evo	1:31.702	+0.704	21	
22	95	(Denmark) Nicki Thiim	T3 Motorsport	Lamborghini Huracán GT3 Evo	1:31.837	+0.839	22	
23	19	(Switzerland) Rolf Ineichen	GRT	Lamborghini Huracán GT3 Evo	1:31.973	+0.975	23	
24	85	(Austria) Clemens Schmid	GRT Grasser Racing.com	Lamborghini Huracán GT3 Evo	1:32.111	+1.113	24	
25	12	(United States) Dev Gore	Team Rosberg	Audi R8 LMS Evo II	1:32.447	+1.449	25	
26	66	(Germany) Marius Zug	Team Rosberg	Audi R8 LMS Evo II	1:32.448	+1.450	26	
27	6	(Italy) Alessio Deledda	GRT Grasser Racing.com	Lamborghini Huracán GT3 Evo	1:33.442	+2.444	27	
28	26	(United Kingdom) Esmee Hawkey	T3 Motorsport	Lamborghini Huracán GT3 Evo	1:34.051	+3.053	28	
29	74	(Brazil) Felipe Fraga	GRT Grasser Racing.com	Lamborghini Huracán GT3 Evo	–	–	29	

==== Race ====
Pos	No.	Driver	Team	Car	Laps	Time / Retired	Grid	Pts
1	31	(South Africa) Sheldon van der Linde	Schubert Motorsport	BMW M4 GT3	36	56:42.296	1	25
2	88	(Germany) Maro Engel	Mercedes-AMG Team GruppeM Racing	Mercedes-AMG GT3 Evo	36	+0.347	3	18
3	33	(Germany) René Rast	Team Abt	Audi R8 LMS Evo II	36	+1.817	2	15
4	25	(Austria) Philipp Eng	Schubert Motorsport	BMW M4 GT3	36	+6.907	11	12
5	51	(Switzerland) Nico Müller	Team Rosberg	Audi R8 LMS Evo II	36	+7.338	6	10
6	63	(Italy) Mirko Bortolotti	GRT	Lamborghini Huracán GT3 Evo	36	+7.682	4	8
7	7	(Switzerland) Ricardo Feller	Team Abt Sportsline	Audi R8 LMS Evo II	36	+14.572	5	6
8	22	(Austria) Lucas Auer	Mercedes-AMG Team Winward	Mercedes-AMG GT3 Evo	36	+14.872	9	4
9	92	(Belgium) Laurens Vanthoor	SSR Performance	Porsche 911 GT3 R	36	+15.426	17	2
10	11	(Germany) Marco Wittmann	Walkenhorst Motorsport	BMW M4 GT3	36	+16.236	12	1
11	94	(Norway) Dennis Olsen	SSR Performance	Porsche 911 GT3 R	36	+16.732	13	
12	4	(Germany) Luca Stolz	Mercedes-AMG Team HRT	Mercedes-AMG GT3 Evo	36	+21.836	8	
13	36	(India) Arjun Maini	Mercedes-AMG Team HRT	Mercedes-AMG GT3 Evo	36	+23.874	14	
14	27	(Germany) David Schumacher	Mercedes-AMG Team Winward	Mercedes-AMG GT3 Evo	36	+27.503	10	
15	1	(Germany) Maximilian Götz	Mercedes-AMG Team Winward	Mercedes-AMG GT3 Evo	36	+27.748	19	
16	19	(Switzerland) Rolf Ineichen	GRT	Lamborghini Huracán GT3 Evo	36	+29.537	23	
17	12	(United States) Dev Gore	Team Rosberg	Audi R8 LMS Evo II	36	+29.981	25	
18	10	(Germany) Esteban Muth	Walkenhorst Motorsport	BMW M4 GT3	36	+31.285	20	
19	26	(United Kingdom) Esmee Hawkey	T3 Motorsport	Lamborghini Huracán GT3 Evo	36	+1:14.562	28	
20	3	(South Africa) Kelvin van der Linde	Team Abt Sportsline	Audi R8 LMS Evo II	36	+1:18.639	15	
21	6	(Italy) Alessio Deledda	GRT Grasser Racing.com	Lamborghini Huracán GT3 Evo	35	+1 lap	27	
22	18	(Germany) Maximilian Buhk	Mercedes-AMG Team Mücke Motorsport	Mercedes-AMG GT3 Evo	34	+2 laps	21	
22	37	(New Zealand) Nick Cassidy	AlphaTauri AF Corse	Ferrari 488 GT3 Evo 2020	32	+4 laps	7	
Ret	66	(Germany) Marius Zug	Attempto Racing	Audi R8 LMS Evo II	29	retired	26	
Ret	85	(Austria) Clemens Schmid	GRT Grasser Racing.com	Lamborghini Huracán GT3 Evo	23	retired	24	
Ret	95	(Denmark) Nicki Thiim	T3 Motorsport	Lamborghini Huracán GT3 Evo	7	retired	22	
Ret	24	(Austria) Thomas Preining	KÜS Team Bernhard	Porsche 911 GT3 R	3	retired	18	
Ret	55	(Canada) Mikaël Grenier	Mercedes-AMG Team GruppeM Racing	Mercedes-AMG GT3 Evo	0	retired	16	
DNS	74	(Brazil) Felipe Fraga	Red Bull AF Corse	Ferrari 488 GT3 Evo 2020	0	retired	29	
Fastest lap set by Maro Engel: 1:32.085

== Championship standings ==
Drivers Championship

Pos	Driver	Pts	Gap
1	(South Africa) Sheldon van der Linde	66	
2	(Italy) Mirko Bortolotti	51	-15
3	(Austria) Lucas Auer	48	-18
4	(Switzerland) Nico Müller	38	-28
5	(Germany) Luca Stolz	37	-29

Teams Championship

Pos	Team	Pts	Gap
1	(Germany) Schubert Motorsport (25, 31)	79	
2	(Austria) Grasser Racing Team (19, 63)	51	-28
3	(United States) Mercedes-AMG Team Winward (22, 27)	48	-31
4	(Germany) Mercedes-AMG Team HRT (4, 36)	48	-31
5	(Germany) Team Rosberg (12, 51)	38	-41

Manufacturers Championship

Pos	Drivers	Pts	Gap
1	(Germany) Mercedes-AMG	130	
2	(Germany) Audi	97	-33
3	(Germany) BMW	94	-36
4	(Austria) Lamborghini	54	-76
5	(Germany) Porsche	30	-100

- Note: Only the top five positions are included for three sets of standings.

Previous race: 2022 Portimão DTM round	Deutsche Tourenwagen Masters; 2022 season	Next race: 2022 Imola DTM round
