= 2022 Imola DTM round =

Motor racing event

(Italy) 2022 DTM Imola round
Round details
- Round 3 of 8 rounds in the 2022 Deutsche Tourenwagen Masters season
- Location: Imola Circuit, Imola, Italy
- Course: Permanent racing facility 4.909 km (3.050 mi)

Deutsche Tourenwagen Masters

Race 1
- Date: 18 June 2022
- Laps: 33

Pole position
Driver	(Germany) René Rast	Team Abt
- Time: 1:39.817

Podium
First	(Germany) René Rast	Team Abt
Second	(Switzerland) Nico Müller	Team Rosberg
Third	(Italy) Mirko Bortolotti	GRT

Fastest lap
Driver	(Italy) Mirko Bortolotti	GRT
- Time: 1:40.957 (on lap 25)

Race 2
- Date: June 20 2022
- Laps: 33

Pole position
Driver	(Switzerland) Ricardo Feller	Team Abt Sportsline

Podium
Second	(United States) Dev Gore	Team Rosberg
Third	(Germany) Marco Wittmann	Walkenhorst Motorsport

Fastest lap
Driver	(New Zealand) Nick Cassidy	AlphaTauri AF Corse
- Time: 1:41.684 (on lap 15)

The 2022 Imola DTM round was a motor racing event for the Deutsche Tourenwagen Masters held between 19 and 20 June 2022. The event, part of the 36th season of the DTM, was held at the Imola Circuit in Italy.

== Results ==
=== Race 1 ===
==== Qualifying ====
Pos.	No.	Driver	Team	Car	Time	Gap	Grid	Pts
1	33	(Germany) René Rast	Team Abt	Audi R8 LMS Evo II	1:39.817		1	3
2	51	(Switzerland) Nico Müller	Team Rosberg	Audi R8 LMS Evo II	1:40.005	+0.188	2	2
3	24	(Austria) Thomas Preining	KÜS Team Bernhard	Porsche 911 GT3 R	1:40.039	+0.222	3	1
4	85	(Austria) Clemens Schmid	GRT Grasser Racing.com	Lamborghini Huracán GT3 Evo	1:40.121	+0.304	4	
5	7	(Switzerland) Ricardo Feller	Team Abt Sportsline	Audi R8 LMS Evo II	1:40.137	+0.320	5	
6	63	(Italy) Mirko Bortolotti	GRT	Lamborghini Huracán GT3 Evo	1:40.180	+0.363	6	
7	3	(South Africa) Kelvin van der Linde	Team Abt Sportsline	Audi R8 LMS Evo II	1:40.348	+0.531	7	
8	11	(Germany) Marco Wittmann	Walkenhorst Motorsport	BMW M4 GT3	1:40.409	+0.592	8	
9	31	(South Africa) Sheldon van der Linde	Schubert Motorsport	BMW M4 GT3	1:40.431	+0.614	9	
10	22	(Austria) Lucas Auer	Mercedes-AMG Team Winward	Mercedes-AMG GT3 Evo	1:40.474	+0.657	10	
11	88	(Germany) Maro Engel	Mercedes-AMG Team GruppeM Racing	Mercedes-AMG GT3 Evo	1:40.570	+0.753	11	
12	94	(Norway) Dennis Olsen	SSR Performance	Porsche 911 GT3 R	1:40.597	+0.780	12	
13	37	(New Zealand) Nick Cassidy	AlphaTauri AF Corse	Ferrari 488 GT3 Evo 2020	1:40.626	+0.809	13	
14	19	(Switzerland) Rolf Ineichen	GRT	Lamborghini Huracán GT3 Evo	1:40.361	+0.814	14	
15	4	(Germany) Luca Stolz	Mercedes-AMG Team HRT	Mercedes-AMG GT3 Evo	1:40.661	0.844	15	
16	92	(Belgium) Laurens Vanthoor	SSR Performance	Porsche 911 GT3 R	1:40.787	+0.970	16	
17	25	(Austria) Philipp Eng	Schubert Motorsport	BMW M4 GT3	1:40.800	+0.983	17	
18	50	(Germany) Timo Glock	Ceccato Motors	BMW M4 GT3	1:40.927	+1.110	18	
19	36	(India) Arjun Maini	Mercedes-AMG Team HRT	Mercedes-AMG GT3 Evo	1:40.945	+1.118	19	
20	1	(Germany) Maximilian Götz	Mercedes-AMG Team Winward	Mercedes-AMG GT3 Evo	1:40.958	+1.141	20	
21	66	(Germany) Marius Zug	Attempto Racing	Audi R8 LMS Evo II	1:41.063	+1.246	21	
22	55	(Germany) Mikaël Grenier	Mercedes-AMG Team GruppeM Racing	Mercedes-AMG GT3 Evo	1:41.127	+1.310	22	
23	18	(Germany) Maximilian Buhk	Mercedes-AMG Team Mücke Motorsport	Mercedes-AMG GT3 Evo	1:41.301	+1.484	23	
24	74	(Brazil) Felipe Fraga	Red Bull AF Corse	Ferrari 488 GT3 Evo 2020	1:41.310	+1.493	24	
25	27	(Germany) David Schumacher	Mercedes-AMG Team Winward	Mercedes-AMG GT3 Evo	1:41.392	+1.575	25	
26	12	(United States) Dev Gore	Team Rosberg	Audi R8 LMS Evo II	1:41.396	+1.579	26	
27	10	(Germany) Esteban Muth	Walkenhorst Motorsport	BMW M4 GT3	1:41.397	+1.580	27	
28	6	(Italy) Alessio Deledda	GRT Grasser Racing.com	Lamborghini Huracán GT3 Evo	1:42.065	+2.548	28	

==== Race ====
Pos	No.	Driver	Team	Car	Laps	Time / Retired	Grid	Pts
1	33	(Germany) René Rast	Team Abt	Audi R8 LMS Evo II	33	57:01.108	1	25
2	51	(Switzerland) Nico Müller	Team Rosberg	Audi R8 LMS Evo II	33	+3.809	2	18
3	63	(Italy) Mirko Bortolotti	GRT	Lamborghini Huracán GT3 Evo	33	+7.936	6	15
4	24	(Austria) Thomas Preining	KÜS Team Bernhard	Porsche 911 GT3 R	33	+9.323	3	12
5	3	(South Africa) Kelvin van der Linde	Team Abt Sportsline	Audi R8 LMS Evo II	33	+10.605	7	10
6	85	(Austria) Clemens Schmid	GRT Grasser Racing.com	Lamborghini Huracán GT3 Evo	33	+13.289	4	8
7	11	(Germany) Marco Wittmann	Walkenhorst Motorsport	BMW M4 GT3	33	+17.853	8	6
8	31	(South Africa) Sheldon van der Linde	Schubert Motorsport	BMW M4 GT3	33	+32.103	9	4
9	94	(Norway) Dennis Olsen	SSR Performance	Porsche 911 GT3 R	33	+32.733	12	2
10	88	(Germany) Maro Engel	Mercedes-AMG Team GruppeM Racing	Mercedes-AMG GT3 Evo	33	+33.394	11	1
11	4	(Germany) Luca Stolz	Mercedes-AMG Team HRT	Mercedes-AMG GT3 Evo	33	+33.858	15	
12	25	(Austria) Philipp Eng	Schubert Motorsport	BMW M4 GT3	33	+34.342	17	
13	92	(Belgium) Laurens Vanthoor	SSR Performance	Porsche 911 GT3 R	33	+34.899	16	
14	37	(New Zealand) Nick Cassidy	AlphaTauri AF Corse	Ferrari 488 GT3 Evo 2020	33	+35.459	13	
15	19	(Switzerland) Rolf Ineichen	GRT	Lamborghini Huracán GT3 Evo	33	+37.410	14	
16	36	(India) Arjun Maini	Mercedes-AMG Team HRT	Mercedes-AMG GT3 Evo	33	+38.061	19	
17	66	(Germany) Marius Zug	Attempto Racing	Audi R8 LMS Evo II	33	+39.428	21	
18	18	(Germany) Maximilian Buhk	AlphaTauri AF Corse	Ferrari 488 GT3 Evo 2020	33	+40.088	23	
19	55	(Canada) Mikaël Grenier	Mercedes-AMG Team GruppeM Racing	Mercedes-AMG GT3 Evo	33	+45.745	22	
20	1	(Germany) Maximilian Götz	Mercedes-AMG Team Winward|	Mercedes-AMG GT3 Evo	33	+46.033	20	
21	27	(Germany) David Schumacher	Mercedes-AMG Team Winward	Mercedes-AMG GT3 Evo	33	+46.657	25	
22	6	(Italy) Alessio Deledda	GRT Grasser Racing.com	Lamborghini Huracán GT3 Evo	33	+1:12.094	28	
Ret	22	(Austria) Lucas Auer	Mercedes-AMG Team Winward	Mercedes-AMG GT3 Evo	26	retired	10	
Ret	7	(Switzerland) Ricardo Feller	Team Abt Sportsline	Audi R8 LMS Evo II	24	retired	5	
Ret	10	(Germany) Esteban Muth	Walkenhorst Motorsport	BMW M4 GT3	23	retired	27	
Ret	74	(Brazil) Felipe Fraga	Red Bull AF Corse	Ferrari 488 GT3 Evo 2020	22	retired	24	
Ret	12	(United States) Dev Gore	Team Rosberg	Audi R8 LMS Evo II	20	retired	26	
Ret	50	(Germany) Timo Glock	Ceccato Motors	BMW M4 GT3	0	retired	18	
Fastest lap set by Mirko Bortolotti: 1:40.957

=== Race 2 ===
==== Qualifying ====
Pos.	No.	Driver	Team	Car	Time	Gap	Grid	Pts
1	7	(Switzerland) Ricardo Feller	Team Abt Sportsline	Audi R8 LMS Evo II	1:39.814		1	3
2	74	(Brazil) Felipe Fraga	GRT Grasser Racing.com	Lamborghini Huracán GT3 Evo	1:39.966	+0.152	2	2
3	11	(Germany) Marco Wittmann	Walkenhorst Motorsport	BMW M4 GT3	1:40.026	+0.212	3	1
4	88	(Germany) Maro Engel	Mercedes-AMG Team GruppeM Racing	Mercedes-AMG GT3 Evo	1:40.059	+0.245	4	
5	85	(Austria) Clemens Schmid	GRT Grasser Racing.com	Lamborghini Huracán GT3 Evo	1:40.066	+0.252	5	
6	37	(New Zealand) Nick Cassidy	AlphaTauri AF Corse	Ferrari 488 GT3 Evo 2020	1:40.067	+0.253	6	
7	4	(Germany) Luca Stolz	Mercedes-AMG Team HRT	Mercedes-AMG GT3 Evo	1:40.121	+0.307	7	
8	33	(Germany) René Rast	Team Abt	Audi R8 LMS Evo II	1:40.136	+0.322	8	
9	22	(Austria) Lucas Auer	Mercedes-AMG Team Winward	Mercedes-AMG GT3 Evo	1:40.185	+0.371	9	
10	63	(Italy) Mirko Bortolotti	GRT	Lamborghini Huracán GT3 Evo	1:40.214	+0.400	10	
11	31	(South Africa) Sheldon van der Linde	Schubert Motorsport	BMW M4 GT3	1:40.267	+0.453	11	
12	25	(Austria) Philipp Eng	Schubert Motorsport	BMW M4 GT3	1:40.319	+0.505	12	
13	51	(Switzerland) Nico Müller	Team Rosberg	Audi R8 LMS Evo II	1:40.330	+0.516	13	
14	3	(South Africa) Kelvin van der Linde	Team Abt Sportsline	Audi R8 LMS Evo II	1:40.341	+0.527	14	
15	55	(Canada) Mikaël Grenier	Mercedes-AMG Team GruppeM Racing	Mercedes-AMG GT3 Evo	1:40.385	+0.571	15	
16	94	(Norway) Dennis Olsen	SSR Performance	Porsche 911 GT3 R	1:40.464	+0.650	16	
17	24	(Austria) Thomas Preining	KÜS Team Bernhard	Porsche 911 GT3 R	1:40.485	+0.671	17	
18	1	(Germany) Maximilian Götz	Mercedes-AMG Team Winward	Mercedes-AMG GT3 Evo	1:40.490	+0.676	18	
19	92	(Belgium) Laurens Vanthoor	SSR Performance	Porsche 911 GT3 R	1:40.520	+0.706	19	
20	50	(Germany) Timo Glock	Ceccato Motors	BMW M4 GT3	1:40.645	+0.831	20	
21	36	(India) Arjun Maini	Mercedes-AMG Team HRT	Mercedes-AMG GT3 Evo	1:40.686	+0.872	21	
22	12	(United States) Dev Gore	Team Rosberg	Audi R8 LMS Evo II	1:40.811	+0.997	22	
23	66	(Germany) Marius Zug	Attempto Racing	Audi R8 LMS Evo II	1:40.833	+1.019	23	
24	27	(Germany) David Schumacher	Mercedes-AMG Team Winward	Mercedes-AMG GT3 Evo	1:40.927	+1.113	24	
25	10	(Germany) Esteban Muth	Walkenhorst Motorsport	BMW M4 GT3	1:41.055	+1.241	25	
26	19	(Switzerland) Rolf Ineichen	GRT	Lamborghini Huracán GT3 Evo	1:41.182	+1.368	26	
27	18	(Germany) Maximilian Buhk	Mercedes-AMG Team Mücke Motorsport	Mercedes-AMG GT3 Evo	1:41.186	+1.372	27	
28	6	(Italy) Alessio Deledda	GRT Grasser Racing.com	Lamborghini Huracán GT3 Evo	1:42.064	+2.250	28	

==== Race ====
Pos	No.	Driver	Team	Car	Laps	Time / Retired	Grid	Pts
1	7	(Switzerland) Ricardo Feller	Team Abt Sportsline	Audi R8 LMS Evo II	33	1:01:05.974	1	25
2	12	(United States) Dev Gore	Team Rosberg	Audi R8 LMS Evo II	33	+1.873	22	18
3	11	(Germany) Marco Wittmann	Walkenhorst Motorsport	BMW M4 GT3	33	+3.188	3	15
4	22	(Austria) Lucas Auer	Mercedes-AMG Team Winward	Mercedes-AMG GT3 Evo	33	+4.064	9	12
5	31	(South Africa) Sheldon van der Linde	Schubert Motorsport	BMW M4 GT3	33	+4.353	11	10
6	25	(Austria) Philipp Eng	Schubert Motorsport	BMW M4 GT3	33	+4.651	12	8
7	88	(Germany) Maro Engel	Mercedes-AMG Team GruppeM Racing	Mercedes-AMG GT3 Evo	33	+5.286	4	6
8	51	(Switzerland) Nico Müller	Team Rosberg	Audi R8 LMS Evo II	33	+8.870	13	4
9	1	(Germany) Maximilian Götz	Mercedes-AMG Team Winward	Mercedes-AMG GT3 Evo	33	+9.395	18	2
10	63	(Italy) Mirko Bortolotti	GRT	Lamborghini Huracán GT3 Evo	33	+9.807	10	1
11	50	(Germany) Timo Glock	Ceccato Motors	BMW M4 GT3	33	+11.692	20	
12	4	(Germany) Luca Stolz	Mercedes-AMG Team HRT	Mercedes-AMG GT3 Evo	33	+12.386	7	
13	3	(South Africa) Kelvin van der Linde	Team Abt Sportsline	Audi R8 LMS Evo II	33	+13.328	14	
14	10	(Germany) Esteban Muth	Walkenhorst Motorsport	BMW M4 GT3	33	+16.823	25	
15	55	(Canada) Mikaël Grenier	Mercedes-AMG Team GruppeM Racing	Mercedes-AMG GT3 Evo	33	+17.158	15	
16	6	(Italy) Alessio Deledda	GRT Grasser Racing.com	Lamborghini Huracán GT3 Evo	33	+27.781	28	
17	37	(New Zealand) Nick Cassidy	AlphaTauri AF Corse	Ferrari 488 GT3 Evo 2020	33	+32.132	6	
18	36	(India) Arjun Maini	Mercedes-AMG Team HRT	Mercedes-AMG GT3 Evo	33	+45.081	21	
Ret	66	(Germany) Marius Zug	Attempto Racing	Audi R8 LMS Evo II	25	retired	23	
Ret	27	(Germany) David Schumacher	Mercedes-AMG Team Winward	Mercedes-AMG GT3 Evo	24	retired	24	
Ret	85	(Austria) Clemens Schmid	GRT Grasser Racing.com	Lamborghini Huracán GT3 Evo	21	retired	5	
Ret	94	(Norway) Dennis Olsen	SSR Performance	Porsche 911 GT3 R	21	retired	16	
Ret	74	(Brazil) Felipe Fraga	Red Bull AF Corse	Ferrari 488 GT3 Evo 2020	9	retired	2	
Ret	33	(Germany) René Rast	Team Abt	Audi R8 LMS Evo II	3	retired	8	
Ret	19	(Switzerland) Rolf Ineichen	GRT	Lamborghini Huracán GT3 Evo	2	retired	26	
Ret	24	(Austria) Thomas Preining	KÜS Team Bernhard	Porsche 911 GT3 R	2	retired	17	
Ret	92	(Belgium) Laurens Vanthoor	SSR Performance	Porsche 911 GT3 R	0	retired	19	
Ret	18	(Germany) Maximilian Buhk	Mercedes-AMG Team Mücke Motorsport	Mercedes-AMG GT3 Evo	0	retired	27	
Fastest lap set by Nick Cassidy: 1:41.684

== Championship standings ==
Drivers Championship

Pos	Driver	Pts	Gap
1	(South Africa) Sheldon van der Linde	80	
2	(Italy) Mirko Bortolotti	68	-12
3	(Switzerland) Nico Müller	62	-18
4	(Austria) Lucas Auer	60	-20
5	(Germany) René Rast	49	-31

Teams Championship

Pos	Team	Pts	Gap
1	(Germany) Schubert Motorsport (25, 31)	101	
2	(Germany) Team Rosberg (12, 51)	80	-21
3	(Germany) Team Abt Sportsline (3, 7)	74	-27
4	(Austria) Grasser Racing Team (19, 63)	67	-34
5	(Germany) Mercedes-AMG Team Winward (4, 36)	60	-41

Manufacturers Championship

Pos	Drivers	Pts	Gap
1	(Germany) Audi	203	
2	(Germany) Mercedes-AMG	151	-52
3	(Germany) BMW	136	-67
4	(Austria) Lamborghini	75	-128
5	(Germany) Porsche	43	-160

- Note: Only the top five positions are included for three sets of standings.

Previous race: 2022 Lausitzring DTM Round	Deutsche Tourenwagen Masters; 2022 season	Next race: 2022 Norisring DTM round
