= 2022 Deutsche Tourenwagen Masters =

Car racing championship

Champions
- Drivers' Champion: Sheldon van der Linde
- Teams' Champion: Schubert Motorsport
- Manufacturers' Champion: Audi

Seasons
- ← 2021 2023 →

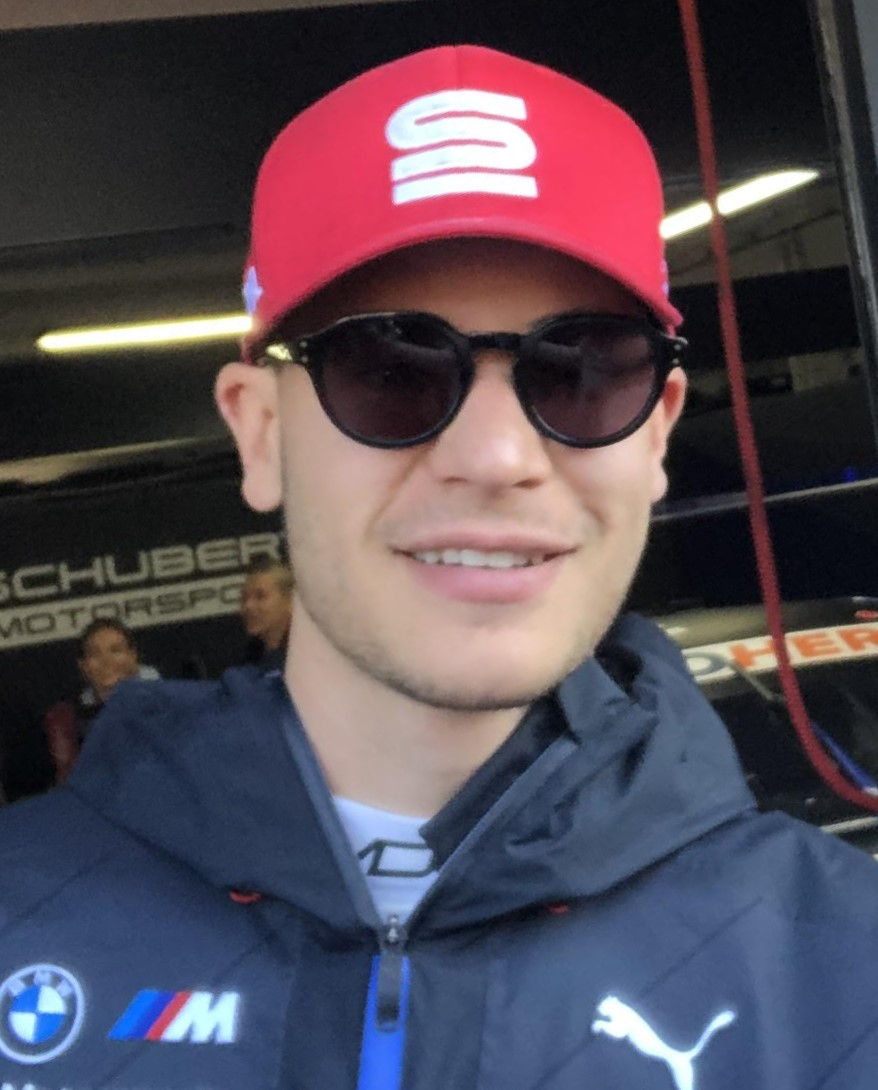
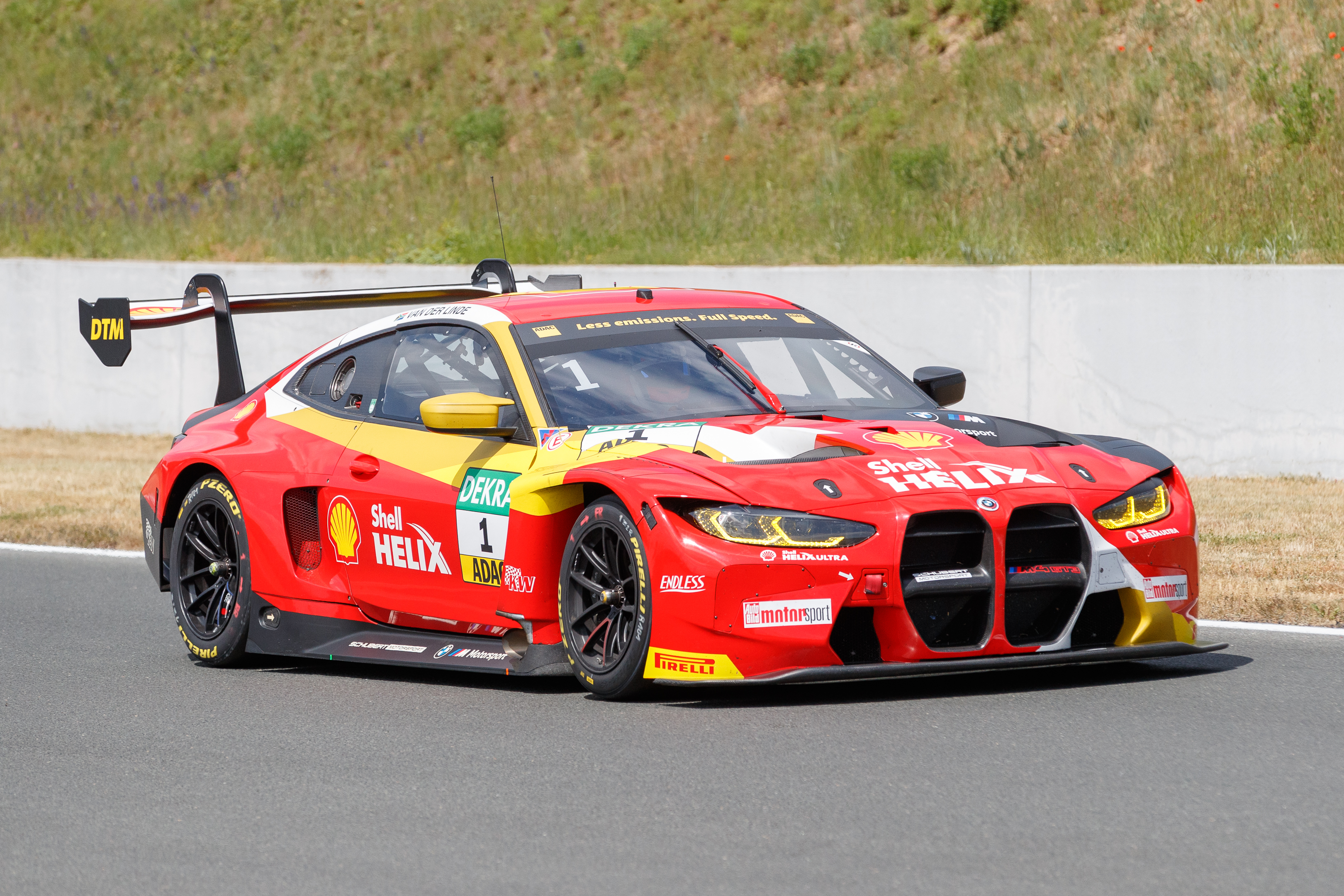
Sheldon van der Linde was the driver's champion, driving for Schubert Motorsport (pictured in 2023), who were the teams' champions.

The 2022 Deutsche Tourenwagen Masters was the thirty-sixth season of the premier German motor racing championship and also the twenty-third season under the moniker of Deutsche Tourenwagen Masters since the series' resumption in 2000. It was the second season of the DTM to be run under Group GT3 regulations.

Sheldon van der Linde won his first DTM championship driving a BMW M4 GT3 for Schubert Motorsport and Schubert Motorsport won the Teams' Championship.

== Teams and drivers ==
All teams competed with tyres supplied by Michelin.

Manufacturer	Car	Engine	Team	No.	Driver	Status	Rounds	Ref.
Audi	Audi R8 LMS Evo II	Audi DAR 5.2 L V10	(Germany) / Team Abt Sportsline (Note: Cars No. 3 and No. 7 entered as Team Abt Sportsline, car No. 33 entered as Team Abt.); (Germany) / Team Abt	3	(South Africa) Kelvin van der Linde		All	
Audi	Audi R8 LMS Evo II	Audi DAR 5.2 L V10	(Germany) / Team Abt Sportsline; (Germany) / Team Abt	7	(Switzerland) Ricardo Feller		All	
Audi	Audi R8 LMS Evo II	Audi DAR 5.2 L V10	(Germany) / Team Abt Sportsline; (Germany) / Team Abt	33	(Germany) René Rast		All	
Audi	Audi R8 LMS Evo II	Audi DAR 5.2 L V10	(Germany) Team Rosberg	12	(United States) Dev Gore		All	
Audi	Audi R8 LMS Evo II	Audi DAR 5.2 L V10	(Germany) Team Rosberg	51	(Switzerland) Nico Müller		All	
Audi	Audi R8 LMS Evo II	Audi DAR 5.2 L V10	(Germany) Attempto Racing	66	(Germany) Marius Zug		All	
BMW	BMW M4 GT3	BMW S58B30T0 3.0 L Twin Turbo I6	(Germany) Walkenhorst Motorsport	10	(Belgium) Esteban Muth		1–6	
BMW	BMW M4 GT3	BMW S58B30T0 3.0 L Twin Turbo I6	(Germany) Walkenhorst Motorsport	10	(Germany) Leon Köhler		7–8	
BMW	BMW M4 GT3	BMW S58B30T0 3.0 L Twin Turbo I6	(Germany) Walkenhorst Motorsport	11	(Germany) Marco Wittmann		All	
BMW	BMW M4 GT3	BMW S58B30T0 3.0 L Twin Turbo I6	(Germany) Walkenhorst Motorsport	34	(Germany) Theo Oeverhaus	G	5	
BMW	BMW M4 GT3	BMW S58B30T0 3.0 L Twin Turbo I6	(Germany) Schubert Motorsport	25	(Austria) Philipp Eng		All	
BMW	BMW M4 GT3	BMW S58B30T0 3.0 L Twin Turbo I6	(Germany) Schubert Motorsport	31	(South Africa) Sheldon van der Linde		All	
BMW	BMW M4 GT3	BMW S58B30T0 3.0 L Twin Turbo I6	(Italy) Ceccato Motors	50	(Germany) Timo Glock	G	3	
Ferrari	Ferrari 488 GT3 Evo 2020	Ferrari F154CB 3.9 L Twin Turbo V8	(Italy) / AlphaTauri AF Corse (Note: Car No. 37 entered as AlphaTauri AF Corse, car No. 74 entered as Red Bull AF Corse. Both cars share a teams' championship entry as "Red Bull AlphaTauri AF Corse".); (Italy) / Red Bull AF Corse	37	(France) Sébastien Loeb		1	
Ferrari	Ferrari 488 GT3 Evo 2020	Ferrari F154CB 3.9 L Twin Turbo V8	(Italy) / AlphaTauri AF Corse; (Italy) / Red Bull AF Corse	37	(New Zealand) Nick Cassidy		2–3, 5–8	
Ferrari	Ferrari 488 GT3 Evo 2020	Ferrari F154CB 3.9 L Twin Turbo V8	(Italy) / AlphaTauri AF Corse; (Italy) / Red Bull AF Corse	37	(Turkey) Ayhancan Güven		4	
Ferrari	Ferrari 488 GT3 Evo 2020	Ferrari F154CB 3.9 L Twin Turbo V8	(Italy) / AlphaTauri AF Corse; (Italy) / Red Bull AF Corse	74	(Brazil) Felipe Fraga		All	
Lamborghini	Lamborghini Huracán GT3 Evo	Lamborghini DGF 5.2 L V10	(Austria) / GRT (Note: Cars No. 19 and No. 63 entered as GRT, cars No. 6 and No. 85 entered as GRT grasser-racing.com.); (Austria) / GRT grasser-racing.com	6	(Italy) Alessio Deledda		All	
Lamborghini	Lamborghini Huracán GT3 Evo	Lamborghini DGF 5.2 L V10	(Austria) / GRT; (Austria) / GRT grasser-racing.com	19	(Switzerland) Rolf Ineichen		1–3, 5–8	
Lamborghini	Lamborghini Huracán GT3 Evo	Lamborghini DGF 5.2 L V10	(Austria) / GRT; (Austria) / GRT grasser-racing.com	19	(France) Franck Perera		4	
Lamborghini	Lamborghini Huracán GT3 Evo	Lamborghini DGF 5.2 L V10	(Austria) / GRT; (Austria) / GRT grasser-racing.com	63	(Italy) Mirko Bortolotti		All	
Lamborghini	Lamborghini Huracán GT3 Evo	Lamborghini DGF 5.2 L V10	(Austria) / GRT; (Austria) / GRT grasser-racing.com	85	(Austria) Clemens Schmid		All	
Lamborghini	Lamborghini Huracán GT3 Evo	Lamborghini DGF 5.2 L V10	(Germany) T3 Motorsport	26	(United Kingdom) Esmee Hawkey		1–2	
Lamborghini	Lamborghini Huracán GT3 Evo	Lamborghini DGF 5.2 L V10	(Germany) T3 Motorsport	95	(Denmark) Nicki Thiim		1–2	
Mercedes-AMG	Mercedes-AMG GT3 Evo	Mercedes-AMG M159 6.2 L V8	(United States) / Mercedes-AMG Team Winward Racing (Note: Car No. 1 entered as Mercedes-AMG Team Winward Racing, cars No. 22 and No. 27 entered as Mercedes-AMG Team Winward.); (United States) / Mercedes-AMG Team Winward	1	(Germany) Maximilian Götz		All	
Mercedes-AMG	Mercedes-AMG GT3 Evo	Mercedes-AMG M159 6.2 L V8	(United States) / Mercedes-AMG Team Winward Racing; (United States) / Mercedes-AMG Team Winward	22	(Austria) Lucas Auer		All	
Mercedes-AMG	Mercedes-AMG GT3 Evo	Mercedes-AMG M159 6.2 L V8	(United States) / Mercedes-AMG Team Winward Racing; (United States) / Mercedes-AMG Team Winward	27	(Germany) David Schumacher		All	
Mercedes-AMG	Mercedes-AMG GT3 Evo	Mercedes-AMG M159 6.2 L V8	(Germany) Mercedes-AMG Team HRT	4	(Germany) Luca Stolz		All	
Mercedes-AMG	Mercedes-AMG GT3 Evo	Mercedes-AMG M159 6.2 L V8	(Germany) Mercedes-AMG Team HRT	36	(India) Arjun Maini		All	
Mercedes-AMG	Mercedes-AMG GT3 Evo	Mercedes-AMG M159 6.2 L V8	(Germany) Mercedes-AMG Team Mücke Motorsport	18	(Germany) Maximilian Buhk		All	
Mercedes-AMG	Mercedes-AMG GT3 Evo	Mercedes-AMG M159 6.2 L V8	(Hong Kong) Mercedes-AMG Team GruppeM Racing	55	(Canada) Mikaël Grenier		All	
Mercedes-AMG	Mercedes-AMG GT3 Evo	Mercedes-AMG M159 6.2 L V8	(Hong Kong) Mercedes-AMG Team GruppeM Racing	88	(Germany) Maro Engel		All	
Porsche	Porsche 911 GT3 R	Porsche M97/80 4.0 L Flat-6	(Germany) KÜS Team Bernhard	24	(Austria) Thomas Preining		All	
Porsche	Porsche 911 GT3 R	Porsche M97/80 4.0 L Flat-6	(Germany) SSR Performance	92	(Belgium) Laurens Vanthoor		1–7	
Porsche	Porsche 911 GT3 R	Porsche M97/80 4.0 L Flat-6	(Germany) SSR Performance	92	(Germany) Christian Engelhart		8	
Porsche	Porsche 911 GT3 R	Porsche M97/80 4.0 L Flat-6	(Germany) SSR Performance	94	(Norway) Dennis Olsen		All	

Icon	Status
G	Guest drivers ineligible for points

=== Team changes ===
- GT World Challenge Europe regulars Attempto Racing joined the DTM full-time, running a single Audi R8 LMS Evo II car.
- Rowe Racing, which ran two BMW M6 GT3 cars full-time in 2021, left the DTM in order to concentrate on endurance racing.
- Schubert Motorsport joined the series full-time by fielding two BMW M4 GT3 cars. Walkenhorst Motorsport also fielded two BMW M4 GT3 cars full-time in 2022, after racing with a single BMW M6 GT3 car in 2021.
- GRT Grasser Racing Team joined the series full-time by fielding a total of four Lamborghini Huracán GT3 Evo cars. The Austrian team is factory-backed by Lamborghini.
- T3 Motorsport were initially set not to be factory-backed by Lamborghini, after racing two Huracán GT3 Evo cars full-time in 2021, but the decision was reversed shortly before the start of the season. The team confirmed the retainment of their 2021 driver Esmee Hawkey and the signing of Nicki Thiim.
- JP Motorsport did not return to the series in 2022, after making guest appearances at three rounds in 2021 by fielding a single McLaren 720S GT3 car.
- Mercedes-AMG Team GetSpeed left the series after running a single-car effort for Arjun Maini in 2021.
- Timo Bernhard's KÜS Team Bernhard team joined the DTM full-time, entering a single Porsche 911 GT3 R car.
- SSR Performance joined the series full-time by fielding two Porsche 911 GT3 R cars, after making a guest appearance with a single car at the Nürburgring round in 2021.

=== Driver changes ===
- Three-time DTM champion René Rast returned to the series with Abt Sportsline and replaced Mike Rockenfeller, who retired from the series at the end of the 2021 season. Ricardo Feller, who won the 2021 ADAC GT Masters, joined the DTM for the first time, replacing Sophia Flörsch in the third Abt Sportsline car.
- German teen racer Marius Zug made his DTM debut for new team Attempto Racing.
- Esteban Muth left Lamborghini for BMW and T3 Motorsport for Walkenhorst Motorsport to become the team's second driver alongside Marco Wittmann.
- Philipp Eng returned to the DTM after a one-year absence and joined Schubert Motorsport to partner Sheldon van der Linde, who drove for Rowe Racing in 2021. Timo Glock, the other Rowe Racing driver in 2021, did not return to the DTM full-time in 2022.
- Mirko Bortolotti joined the series full-time for the GRT Grasser Racing Team, after making a guest appearance for T3 Motorsport at the Assen round in 2021 and finishing second in the first race. He is partnered by ADAC GT Masters racer Clemens Schmid, Formula 2 driver Alessio Deledda and Swiss gentleman driver Rolf Ineichen, all three making their DTM debuts.
- Aston Martin factory driver Nicki Thiim made his DTM debut, driving a Lamborghini Huracán GT3 Evo for T3 Motorsport.
- Liam Lawson and Alex Albon, who drove for the Red Bull-backed AF Corse team in 2021, did not return to the series in 2022, as Lawson switched his focus to Formula 2 and Albon returned to Formula One with Williams Racing. They were replaced by Felipe Fraga, who made his DTM debut, and Nick Cassidy, who already stood in for Albon at the 2021 season finale.
- Defending champion Maximilian Götz left Team HRT to replace Philip Ellis at Team Winward, both teams running a Mercedes-AMG. Team HRT replaced Götz with Luca Stolz, who joined the DTM full-time after making a guest appearance at the Nürburgring round in 2021. Arjun Maini also moved between Mercedes-AMG teams, as he left Team GetSpeed for Team HRT to replace Vincent Abril.
- Maro Engel returned to the DTM for the first time since 2017 to drive a Mercedes-AMG for Team GruppeM Racing alongside Mikaël Grenier, who joined the series for the first time to replace Daniel Juncadella.
- Former FIA Formula 3 driver David Schumacher joined the series for the first time to drive a third car for Mercedes-AMG Team Winward, partnering Götz and Lucas Auer.
- Thomas Preining joined the series for the first time, driving KÜS Team Bernhard's sole Porsche 911 GT3 R car.
- Laurens Vanthoor and Dennis Olsen joined the series for the first time, driving the two Porsche 911 GT3 R cars fielded by SSR Performance.

== Rule changes ==
=== Sporting ===
- One championship point will be awarded for the fastest race lap.
- Team orders were completely outlawed in the wake of the 2021 season finale controversy at the Norisring. Teams and drivers who influence the race via team orders might be excluded from the championship.
- Introduction of "full-course yellow" (FCY) to replace safety car interventions when appropriate. Restarts will be done two-abreast, similar to the series' race and safety car restarts.
- The mandatory pit stop can now be made while the safety car is deployed.
- The race start procedure has been revised: the race gets underway with a starting light at the hands of the race director. Previously, the pole-sitter could decide when to go full-throttle. The starting formation can now be left as soon as the starting light releases the field.
- Pit stop procedures have been modified: a maximum of two mechanics on each side of the car have to change the rear wheels first before the change at the front axle can begin. Mandatory pit stops can not be served prior to minute 10 or after minute 40 of the race.

=== Technical ===
- Balance of performance (BoP) can now be changed at any time throughout the season up until the last race.

== Race calendar ==
A nine-round 2022 calendar was announced on 3 September 2021. On 23 December 2021, it was announced that an unconfirmed round outside Germany on 4 and 5 June 2022 would not take place, making it an eight-round calendar.

Round	Circuit	Location	Race 1	Race 2
1	(Portugal) Algarve International Circuit	Portimão, Algarve	30 April	1 May
2	(Germany) Lausitzring (GP Circuit with Banked Turn 1)	Klettwitz, Brandenburg	21 May	22 May
3	(Italy) Imola Circuit	Imola, Emilia-Romagna	18 June	19 June
4	(Germany) Norisring	Nuremberg, Bavaria	2 July	3 July
5	(Germany) Nürburgring (Sprint Circuit)	Nürburg, Rhineland-Palatinate	27 August	28 August
6	(Belgium) Circuit de Spa-Francorchamps	Stavelot, Liège	10 September	11 September
7	(Austria) Red Bull Ring	Spielberg, Styria	24 September	25 September
8	(Germany) Hockenheimring	Hockenheim, Baden-Württemberg	8 October	9 October

=== Calendar changes ===
- Spa-Francorchamps returns to the DTM calendar after a one-year hiatus while Portimão and Imola will make their DTM débuts. On the opposite side, the rounds at Zolder, Assen and Monza were ousted from the calendar.
- The Norisring round will return to its traditional spot in early July, after the circuit hosted the season finale for the first time in 2021. On the other hand, the Hockenheimring round will retain its traditional spot in early October and return to being the final round of the season.

== Results and standings ==
=== Season summary ===
Round		Circuit	Pole position	Fastest lap	Winning driver	Winning team	Winning manufacturer	Reports
1	R1	(Portugal) Algarve International Circuit	(Italy) Mirko Bortolotti	(Germany) Luca Stolz	(Austria) Lucas Auer	(United States) Mercedes-AMG Team Winward	(Germany) Mercedes	Report
1	R2	(Portugal) Algarve International Circuit	(Switzerland) Nico Müller	(Brazil) Felipe Fraga	(Switzerland) Nico Müller	(Germany) Team Rosberg	(Germany) Audi	Report
2	R1	(Germany) Lausitzring (GP Circuit with Banked Turn 1)	(Austria) Lucas Auer	(South Africa) Sheldon van der Linde	(South Africa) Sheldon van der Linde	(Germany) Schubert Motorsport	(Germany) BMW	Report
2	R2	(Germany) Lausitzring (GP Circuit with Banked Turn 1)	(South Africa) Sheldon van der Linde	(Germany) Maro Engel	(South Africa) Sheldon van der Linde	(Germany) Schubert Motorsport	(Germany) BMW	Report
3	R1	(Italy) Imola Circuit	(Germany) René Rast	(Italy) Mirko Bortolotti	(Germany) René Rast	(Germany) Team Abt	(Germany) Audi	Report
3	R2	(Italy) Imola Circuit	(Switzerland) Ricardo Feller	(New Zealand) Nick Cassidy	(Switzerland) Ricardo Feller	(Germany) Team Abt Sportsline	(Germany) Audi	Report
4	R1	(Germany) Norisring	(South Africa) Kelvin van der Linde	(Austria) Thomas Preining	(Austria) Thomas Preining	(Germany) KÜS Team Bernhard	(Germany) Porsche	Report
4	R2	(Germany) Norisring	(Brazil) Felipe Fraga	(Italy) Mirko Bortolotti	(Brazil) Felipe Fraga	(Italy) Red Bull AF Corse	(Italy) Ferrari	Report
5	R1	(Germany) Nürburgring (Sprint Circuit)	(Italy) Mirko Bortolotti (Note: The Qualifying session was cancelled due to heavy fog. The grid was set by championship position.)	(South Africa) Kelvin van der Linde	(South Africa) Sheldon van der Linde	(Germany) Schubert Motorsport	(Germany) BMW	Report
5	R2	(Germany) Nürburgring (Sprint Circuit)	(South Africa) Sheldon van der Linde	(Germany) Luca Stolz	(Germany) Luca Stolz	(Germany) Mercedes-AMG Team HRT	(Germany) Mercedes	Report
6	R1	(Belgium) Circuit de Spa-Francorchamps	(Norway) Dennis Olsen	(Germany) Maximilian Götz	(Norway) Dennis Olsen	(Germany) SSR Performance	(Germany) Porsche	Report
6	R2	(Belgium) Circuit de Spa-Francorchamps	(Germany) René Rast	(Switzerland) Rolf Ineichen	(New Zealand) Nick Cassidy	(Italy) AlphaTauri AF Corse	(Italy) Ferrari	Report
7	R1	(Austria) Red Bull Ring	(New Zealand) Nick Cassidy	(Italy) Mirko Bortolotti	(New Zealand) Nick Cassidy	(Italy) AlphaTauri AF Corse	(Italy) Ferrari	Report
7	R2	(Austria) Red Bull Ring	(Germany) Maro Engel	(Austria) Lucas Auer	(Austria) Thomas Preining	(Germany) KÜS Team Bernhard	(Germany) Porsche	Report
8	R1	(Germany) Hockenheimring	(Austria) Lucas Auer	(South Africa) Sheldon van der Linde	(Austria) Lucas Auer	(United States) Mercedes-AMG Team Winward	(Germany) Mercedes	Report
8	R2	(Germany) Hockenheimring	(Germany) René Rast	(Germany) Marco Wittmann	(Germany) Marco Wittmann	(Germany) Walkenhorst Motorsport	(Germany) BMW	Report

=== Scoring system ===
Points were awarded to the top ten classified finishers as follows:

Race Position	**1st**	**2nd**	**3rd**	**4th**	**5th**	**6th**	**7th**	**8th**	**9th**	**10th**	**FL**
Points	25	18	15	12	10	8	6	4	2	1	1

Additionally, the top three placed drivers in qualifying also received points:

Qualifying Position	**1st**	**2nd**	**3rd**
Points	3	2	1

=== Drivers' championship ===
Pos.	Driver	POR (Portugal)		LAU (Germany)		IMO (Italy)		NOR (Germany)		NÜR (Germany)		SPA (Belgium)		RBR (Austria)		HOC (Germany)		Points
1	(South Africa) Sheldon van der Linde	7	8	1^{2}	**1**^{1}	8	5	Ret	15	1	**9**^{1}	12	2^{2}	11	11	2	3	164
2	(Austria) Lucas Auer	1^{3}	22	**3**^{1}	8	Ret	4	Ret	13	5	3	Ret^{3}	4	4	6	**1**^{1}	7	153
3	(Germany) René Rast	Ret	12	8	3^{2}	**1**^{1}	Ret	3	3	9	Ret	4	**Ret**^{1}	2^{1}	10	5	**2**^{1}	149
4	(Italy) Mirko Bortolotti	**3**^{1}	3^{2}	6	6	3	10	Ret	2^{2}	**Ret**	19	8	10	3	8	7^{3}	Ret	121
5	(Austria) Thomas Preining	13	Ret	Ret	Ret	4^{3}	Ret	1^{2}	9	Ret	7	3^{2}	3	5	1	Ret	DNS	116
6	(Germany) Luca Stolz	2	Ret	2	12	11	12	7	8	17	1	15	5	10	2	9^{2}	9	108
7	(Switzerland) Nico Müller	Ret	**1**^{1}	Ret	5	2^{2}	8	Ret	12	Ret	6	6	22	6^{3}	7	8	6	105
8	(Germany) Marco Wittmann	NC	4	Ret	10	7	3^{3}	Ret	4^{3}	8	10	9	9	14	12	3	1	98
9	(South Africa) Kelvin van der Linde	4	6	Ret	20	5	13	**Ret**^{1}	Ret	2	4^{2}	5	14	8	Ret	12	5	90
10	(Norway) Dennis Olsen	5	11	Ret	11	9	Ret	2	5	Ret	2^{3}	**1**^{1}	19	Ret	9	Ret	DNS	89
11	(Germany) Maximilian Götz	11	5	10	15	20	9	6	6	4	5	2	15	9	20^{2}	15	Ret	74
12	(Germany) Maro Engel	10	10	5^{3}	2^{3}	10	7	Ret	10	16	Ret	Ret	23	7	**3**^{1}	11	Ret	65
13	(New Zealand) Nick Cassidy			9	23	14	17			7	Ret	10	1^{3}	**1**^{2}	18^{3}	Ret	DNS	64
14	(Austria) Philipp Eng	9	Ret	Ret	4	12	6	5	11	6	Ret	Ret	7	12	5	6	Ret	64
15	(Switzerland) Ricardo Feller	6	9	Ret	7	Ret	**1**^{1}	8	Ret	3	Ret	18	13	15	22	Ret	12	63
16	(Brazil) Felipe Fraga	Ret	2^{3}	Ret	DNS	Ret	Ret^{2}	Ret	**1**^{1}	Ret	DSQ	7	8	Ret	15	13	DNS	60
17	(United States) Dev Gore	Ret	20	16	17	Ret	2	Ret	19	Ret	Ret	21	25	20	Ret	4	11	30
18	(Belgium) Laurens Vanthoor	8	7	7	9	13	Ret	4	16	Ret	11	Ret	12	Ret	16			30
19	(India) Arjun Maini	17	13	4	13	16	18	Ret	14	15	14	14	11	13	4	Ret	DNS	24
20	(Canada) Mikaël Grenier	15^{2}	Ret	Ret	Ret	19	15	9	Ret	10	8	Ret	6	Ret	DNS	Ret	DNS	17
21	(Germany) Marius Zug	18	16	15	Ret	17	Ret	11	Ret	14	12	17	16	19	19	Ret	4^{3}	13
22	(Austria) Clemens Schmid	21	19	17	Ret	6	Ret	10	17	12	Ret	22	26	Ret	17	Ret	Ret^{2}	11
23	(Turkey) Ayhancan Güven							Ret^{3}	7									7
24	(Germany) Leon Köhler													Ret	13	16	8	4
25	(Germany) Maximilian Buhk	19	17	11	22	18	Ret	Ret	Ret	11	13	16	21	17	14	10	Ret	1
26	(Italy) Alessio Deledda	22	23	19	21	22	16	Ret	18	20	16	20	18	21	21	Ret	10	1
27	(Switzerland) Rolf Ineichen	Ret	Ret	14	16	15	Ret			18	17	19	17	18	23	Ret	DNS	1
28	(Germany) David Schumacher	20	15	Ret	14	21	Ret	Ret	Ret	Ret	Ret	11	20	16	24	Ret	DNS	0
29	(Belgium) Esteban Muth	14	14	12	18	Ret	14	Ret	DNS	13	15	13	24					0
30	(Denmark) Nicki Thiim	12	Ret	13	Ret													0
31	(Germany) Christian Engelhart															14	Ret	0
32	(France) Sébastien Loeb	16	18															0
33	(United Kingdom) Esmee Hawkey	Ret	21	18	19													0
34	(France) Franck Perera							Ret	DNS									0
Guest drivers ineligible to score points
—	(Germany) Timo Glock					Ret	11											0
—	(Germany) Theo Oeverhaus									19	18							0
Pos.	Driver	POR (Portugal)		LAU (Germany)		IMO (Italy)		NOR (Germany)		NÜR (Germany)		SPA (Belgium)		RBR (Austria)		HOC (Germany)		Points

Colour	Result
Gold	Winner
Silver	Second place
Bronze	Third place
Green	Points classification
Blue	Non-points classification
Blue	Non-classified finish (NC)
Purple	Retired, not classified (Ret)
Red	Did not qualify (DNQ)
Red	Did not pre-qualify (DNPQ)
Black	Disqualified (DSQ)
White	Did not start (DNS)
White	Withdrew (WD)
White	Race cancelled (C)
Blank	Did not practice (DNP)
Blank	Did not arrive (DNA)
Blank	Excluded (EX)

**Bold** – Pole
Italics – Fastest Lap
1 – 3 Points for Pole
2 – 2 Points for P2
3 – 1 Point for P3

=== Teams' championship ===
Pos.	Team	Points
1	(Germany) Schubert Motorsport	226
2	(United States) Mercedes-AMG Team Winward	152
3	(Germany) Team Abt Sportsline	152
4	(Germany) Team Abt	149
5	(Germany) Team Rosberg	135
6	(Germany) Mercedes-AMG Team HRT	130
7	(Italy) Red Bull AlphaTauri AF Corse	129
8	(Germany) SSR Performance	119
9	(Austria) GRT	118
10	(Germany) KÜS Team Bernhard	115
11	(Germany) Walkenhorst Motorsport	101
12	(Hong Kong) Mercedes-AMG Team GruppeM Racing	81
13	(United States) Mercedes-AMG Team Winward Racing	73
14	(Germany) Attempto Racing	13
15	(Austria) GRT grasser-racing.com	12
16	(Germany) Mercedes-AMG Team Mücke Motorsport	1
17	(Germany) T3 Motorsport	0

=== Manufacturers' championship ===
Only points scored by the top three drivers of a manufacturer in races count for the manufacturers' championship.

Pos.	Manufacturer	Points
1	(Germany) Audi	441
2	(Germany) Mercedes-AMG	413
3	(Germany) BMW	327
4	(Germany) Porsche	234
5	(Italy) Lamborghini	130
6	(Italy) Ferrari	129

== Bibliography ==
- Upietz, Tim (12 December 2022). DTM 2022: Das offizielle Jahrbuch. Duisburg: Gruppe C Motorsport Verlag. ISBN 978-3-948501-20-4.
