= 2021 Deutsche Tourenwagen Masters =

Car racing championship

Champions
- Drivers' Champion: Maximilian Götz
- Teams' Champion: Red Bull AlphaTauri AF Corse
- Manufacturers' Champion: Mercedes-AMG

Seasons
- ← 2020 2022 →

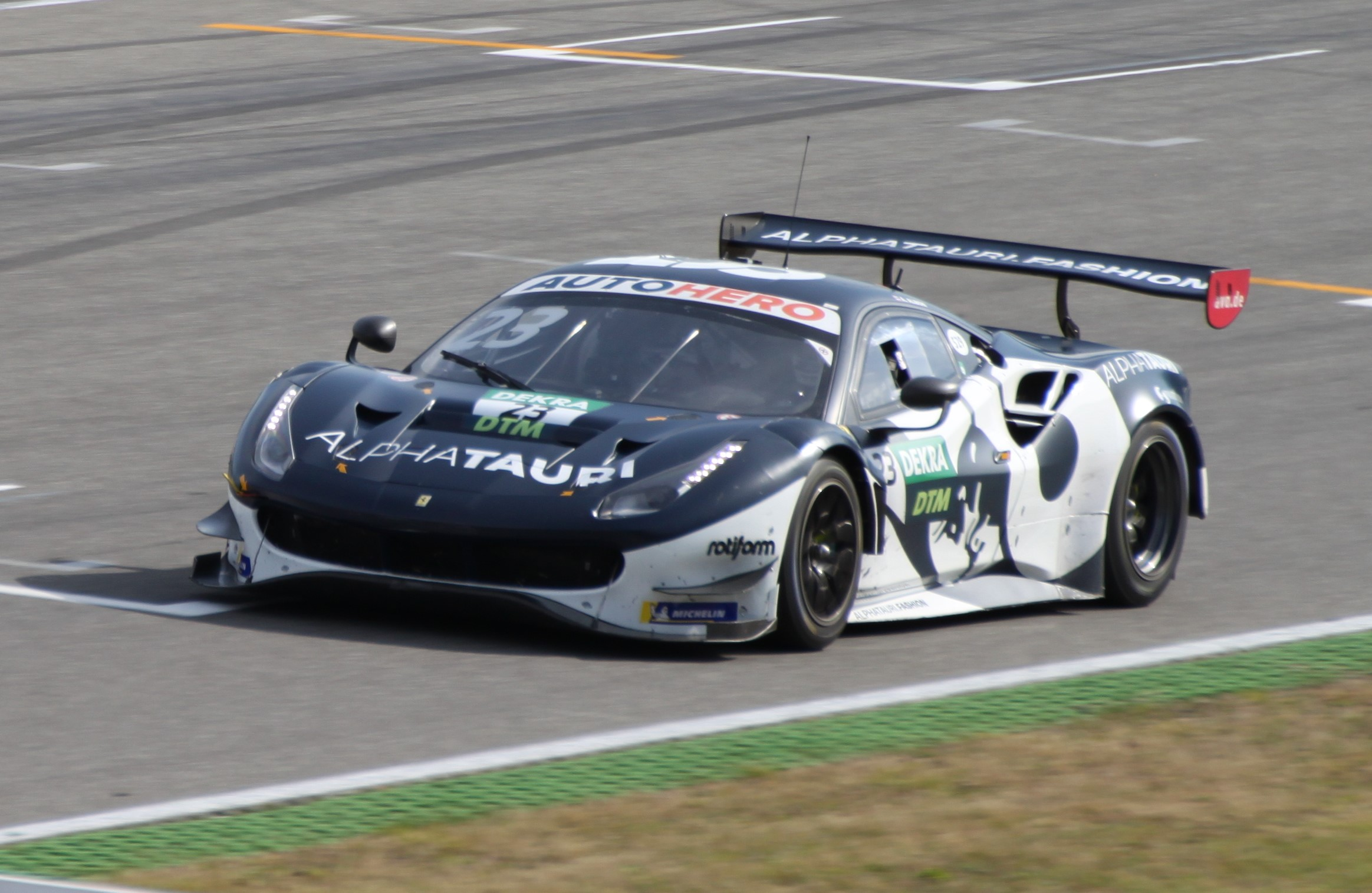
The Ferrari 488 GT3 Evo of teams' champions Red Bull AlphaTauri AF Corse, pictured at the Hockenheimring in October

The 2021 Deutsche Tourenwagen Masters was the thirty-fifth season of the premier German motor racing championship and also the twenty-second season under the moniker of Deutsche Tourenwagen Masters since the series' resumption in 2000.

It was the first season of the DTM to be run under Group GT3 regulations, following the costly two-year "Class 1 Touring Cars" venture that led to Audi and BMW withdrawing manufacturer support from the series.

Maximilian Götz won the drivers' championship in the last race, surrounded by a controversy due to a first-corner collision between his rivals Kelvin van der Linde and Liam Lawson, as well as team orders imposed by Mercedes-AMG in the closing laps.

== Rule changes ==
=== Technical ===
- As a consequence of ruthlessly brutal raising costs, after two seasons raced under "Class 1" formula format, the series officially transitioned to FIA GT3 regulation, using its own Balance of Performance. The move from Class 1 to GT3 attracted more manufacturers and teams that couldn't previously compete in the series due to high cost. The Class 1 format cars and 2.0-litre (122 cubic inches) turbocharged inline-4 engines that were used in 2019 and 2020 were permanently retired.
- After 10 seasons, Hankook terminated its tyre supplier contract with the DTM despite being under contract until 2023. On 1 March 2021, it was announced that Michelin was to provide tyres for the 2021 season.

=== Sporting ===
- For the first time since 2001, the series no longer utilises standing starts for the commencement of races. Instead the series introduced its so-called "DTM formation start" in a rolling double-file formation.

== Teams and drivers ==
All teams competed with tyres supplied by Michelin.

Manufacturer	Car	Engine	Team	No.	Driver	Status	Rounds	Ref.
Audi	Audi R8 LMS Evo	Audi BXA 5.2 L V10	(Germany) / Team Abt Sportsline (Note: Cars No. 3, No.9 and No. 37 entered as Team Abt Sportsline, car No. 99 entered as Team Abt.); (Germany) / Team Abt	3	(South Africa) Kelvin van der Linde		All	
Audi	Audi R8 LMS Evo	Audi BXA 5.2 L V10	(Germany) / Team Abt Sportsline; (Germany) / Team Abt	9	(Germany) Mike Rockenfeller		All	
Audi	Audi R8 LMS Evo	Audi BXA 5.2 L V10	(Germany) / Team Abt Sportsline; (Germany) / Team Abt	37	(Brazil) Lucas di Grassi	G	7–8	
Audi	Audi R8 LMS Evo	Audi BXA 5.2 L V10	(Germany) / Team Abt Sportsline; (Germany) / Team Abt	99	(Germany) Sophia Flörsch	J	1–3, 5–8	
Audi	Audi R8 LMS Evo	Audi BXA 5.2 L V10	(Germany) / Team Abt Sportsline; (Germany) / Team Abt	99	(Germany) Markus Winkelhock		4	
Audi	Audi R8 LMS Evo	Audi BXA 5.2 L V10	(Germany) Team Rosberg	12	(United States) Dev Gore		1–3, 5–8	
Audi	Audi R8 LMS Evo	Audi BXA 5.2 L V10	(Germany) Team Rosberg	12	(Germany) Christopher Haase		4	
Audi	Audi R8 LMS Evo	Audi BXA 5.2 L V10	(Germany) Team Rosberg	51	(Switzerland) Nico Müller		All	
BMW	BMW M6 GT3	BMW S63 4.4 L Twin Turbo V8	(Germany) Walkenhorst Motorsport	11	(Germany) Marco Wittmann		All	
BMW	BMW M6 GT3	BMW S63 4.4 L Twin Turbo V8	(Germany) ROWE Racing	16	(Germany) Timo Glock		All	
BMW	BMW M6 GT3	BMW S63 4.4 L Twin Turbo V8	(Germany) ROWE Racing	31	(South Africa) Sheldon van der Linde	J	All	
Ferrari	Ferrari 488 GT3 Evo 2020	Ferrari F154 3.9 L Twin Turbo V8	(Italy) / AlphaTauri AF Corse (Note: Car No. 23 entered as AlphaTauri AF Corse, car No. 30 entered as Red Bull AF Corse. Both cars share a teams' championship entry as "Red Bull AlphaTauri AF Corse".); (Italy) / Red Bull AF Corse	23	(Thailand) Alex Albon		1–7	
Ferrari	Ferrari 488 GT3 Evo 2020	Ferrari F154 3.9 L Twin Turbo V8	(Italy) / AlphaTauri AF Corse; (Italy) / Red Bull AF Corse	23	(New Zealand) Nick Cassidy		8	
Ferrari	Ferrari 488 GT3 Evo 2020	Ferrari F154 3.9 L Twin Turbo V8	(Italy) / AlphaTauri AF Corse; (Italy) / Red Bull AF Corse	30	(New Zealand) Liam Lawson	J	All	
Lamborghini	Lamborghini Huracán GT3 Evo	Lamborghini 5.2 L V10	(Germany) T3 Motorsport	10	(Belgium) Esteban Muth	J	All	
Lamborghini	Lamborghini Huracán GT3 Evo	Lamborghini 5.2 L V10	(Germany) T3 Motorsport	26	(United Kingdom) Esmee Hawkey		All	
Lamborghini	Lamborghini Huracán GT3 Evo	Lamborghini 5.2 L V10	(Germany) T3 Motorsport	63	(Italy) Mirko Bortolotti	G	6	
Lamborghini	Lamborghini Huracán GT3 Evo	Lamborghini 5.2 L V10	(Germany) T3 Motorsport	71	(Germany) Maximilian Paul	G	5	
McLaren	McLaren 720S GT3	McLaren M840T 4.0 L Twin Turbo V8	(Poland) JP Motorsport	15	(Austria) Christian Klien	G	3–4, 6	
Mercedes-AMG	Mercedes-AMG GT3 Evo	Mercedes-AMG M159 6.2 L V8	(Germany) Mercedes-AMG Team HRT	4	(Germany) Maximilian Götz		All	
Mercedes-AMG	Mercedes-AMG GT3 Evo	Mercedes-AMG M159 6.2 L V8	(Germany) Mercedes-AMG Team HRT	5	(Monaco) Vincent Abril		All	
Mercedes-AMG	Mercedes-AMG GT3 Evo	Mercedes-AMG M159 6.2 L V8	(Germany) Mercedes-AMG Team HRT	6	(Germany) Hubert Haupt	G	4, 7	
Mercedes-AMG	Mercedes-AMG GT3 Evo	Mercedes-AMG M159 6.2 L V8	(Germany) Mercedes-AMG Team Toksport WRT	7	(Germany) Luca Stolz	G	4	
Mercedes-AMG	Mercedes-AMG GT3 Evo	Mercedes-AMG M159 6.2 L V8	(Hong Kong) Mercedes-AMG Team GruppeM Racing	8	(Spain) Daniel Juncadella		All	
Mercedes-AMG	Mercedes-AMG GT3 Evo	Mercedes-AMG M159 6.2 L V8	(Germany) Mercedes-AMG Team Mücke Motorsport	18	(Germany) Maximilian Buhk		1–6, 8	
Mercedes-AMG	Mercedes-AMG GT3 Evo	Mercedes-AMG M159 6.2 L V8	(Germany) Mercedes-AMG Team Mücke Motorsport	18	(Germany) Marvin Dienst		7	
Mercedes-AMG	Mercedes-AMG GT3 Evo	Mercedes-AMG M159 6.2 L V8	(United States) Mercedes-AMG Team Winward	22	(Austria) Lucas Auer		All	
Mercedes-AMG	Mercedes-AMG GT3 Evo	Mercedes-AMG M159 6.2 L V8	(United States) Mercedes-AMG Team Winward	57	(Switzerland) Philip Ellis		All	
Mercedes-AMG	Mercedes-AMG GT3 Evo	Mercedes-AMG M159 6.2 L V8	(Germany) Mercedes-AMG Team GetSpeed	36	(India) Arjun Maini		All	
Porsche	Porsche 911 GT3 R	Porsche MA1.76/MDG.G 4.0 L Flat-6	(Germany) SSR Performance	92	(Germany) Michael Ammermüller	G	4	

Icon	Status
J	Junior
G	Guest drivers ineligible for points

=== Manufacturer changes ===
- Mercedes-Benz returned to the series after two years of absence, but acted as a privateer manufacturer.
- Ferrari, McLaren and Lamborghini joined the series for the first time, but acted as privateer manufacturers.
- Audi and BMW remained in the series, but acted as privateer manufacturers.

=== Team changes ===
- Hong Kong sports car team GruppeM Racing joined the series for the first time by fielding a Mercedes-AMG GT3 Evo car.
- Italian sports car team AF Corse joined the series with backing from Red Bull and AlphaTauri by fielding two Ferrari 488 GT3 Evo 2020 machines.
- German sports car team Haupt Racing Team joined the series for the first time by fielding two Mercedes-AMG GT3 Evo cars.
- American sports car team HTP Winward Motorsport joined the series for the first time by fielding two Mercedes-AMG GT3 Evo cars.
- German sports car team ROWE Racing joined the series for the first time by fielding two BMW M6 GT3 cars.
- Polish JP Motorsport joined the series for the first time by fielding a McLaren 720S GT3 car, but only as a guest participant at three rounds.
- German sports car team T3 Motorsport joined the series for the first time by fielding two Lamborghini Huracán GT3 Evo cars.

=== Driver changes ===
==== Entering DTM ====
Former Red Bull Formula One driver Alex Albon and Formula 2 driver and Red Bull Junior Team member Liam Lawson entered the series with the Red Bull-backed AF Corse team. Lawson contested the full season combining it with an entry in the Formula 2 Championship, while Albon was scheduled to compete in selected races where they did not clash with Formula One Grand Prix weekends due to his commitments as Red Bull Racing's test and reserve driver. Eventually, Albon only missed the final round at the Norisring, where he was replaced by former Super Formula, Super GT, and current Formula E driver Nick Cassidy.

Gary Paffett was set to come back to the DTM after a two-year absence driving for Mercedes-AMG Team Mücke Motorsport, with Maximilian Buhk standing in for him in two rounds due to Formula E commitments. He was eventually forced to abandon these plans because of the COVID-19 restrictions though, and Buhk saw out the season.

==== Leaving DTM ====
Robert Kubica left the series after one season. Three times DTM champion René Rast left the championship for Formula E Audi full-time entry.

== Race calendar ==
A preliminary nine-round, eighteen-race calendar was announced on 6 November 2020; four rounds were to be held in Germany, with the remaining five held across Europe.

Igora Drive, Monza and the Norisring – all of which were scheduled to hold events in 2020, before their respective cancellations due to the COVID-19 pandemic – returned to the calendar, and the Red Bull Ring will hold a round for the first time since 2018. All circuits that held events in 2020 will return in 2021, with the exception of Spa-Francorchamps; Anderstorp and Brands Hatch will also not return, after their rounds were cancelled due to the COVID-19 pandemic. Igora Drive was cancelled and DTM published a new calendar for the 2021 season. The inclusion of the Norisring round was uncertain as the season began in mid-June and it missed its traditional spot in early July, before it was re-added to the calendar to be held in October as the final round of the season.

Round	Circuit	Location	Race 1	Race 2
1	(Italy) Autodromo Nazionale di Monza	Monza, Lombardy	19 June	20 June
2	(Germany) Lausitzring (GP Circuit with Banked Turn 1)	Klettwitz, Brandenburg	24 July	25 July
3	(Belgium) Circuit Zolder	Heusden-Zolder, Limburg	7 August	8 August
4	(Germany) Nürburgring (Sprint Circuit)	Nürburg, Rhineland-Palatinate	21 August	22 August
5	(Austria) Red Bull Ring	Spielberg, Styria	4 September	5 September
6	(Netherlands) TT Circuit Assen	Assen, Drenthe	18 September	19 September
7	(Germany) Hockenheimring	Hockenheim, Baden-Württemberg	2 October	3 October
8	(Germany) Norisring	Nuremberg, Bavaria	9 October	10 October

== Results and standings ==
=== Season summary ===
Round		Circuit	Pole position	Fastest lap	Winning driver	Winning team	Winning manufacturer	Junior winner
1	R1	(Italy) Autodromo Nazionale di Monza	(Monaco) Vincent Abril	(New Zealand) Liam Lawson	(New Zealand) Liam Lawson	(Italy) Red Bull AF Corse	(Italy) Ferrari	(New Zealand) Liam Lawson
1	R2	(Italy) Autodromo Nazionale di Monza	(South Africa) Kelvin van der Linde	(Austria) Lucas Auer	(South Africa) Kelvin van der Linde	(Germany) Team Abt Sportsline	(Germany) Audi	(South Africa) Sheldon van der Linde
2	R1	(Germany) Lausitzring (GP Circuit with Banked Turn 1)	(South Africa) Sheldon van der Linde	(South Africa) Sheldon van der Linde	(Switzerland) Philip Ellis	(United States) Mercedes-AMG Team Winward	(Germany) Mercedes-AMG	(New Zealand) Liam Lawson
2	R2	(Germany) Lausitzring (GP Circuit with Banked Turn 1)	(Switzerland) Philip Ellis	(South Africa) Kelvin van der Linde	(Germany) Maximilian Götz	(Germany) Mercedes-AMG Team HRT	(Germany) Mercedes-AMG	(New Zealand) Liam Lawson
3	R1	(Belgium) Circuit Zolder	(South Africa) Kelvin van der Linde	(Thailand) Alex Albon	(South Africa) Kelvin van der Linde	(Germany) Team Abt Sportsline	(Germany) Audi	(Belgium) Esteban Muth
3	R2	(Belgium) Circuit Zolder	(Germany) Marco Wittmann	(Switzerland) Nico Müller	(Germany) Marco Wittmann	(Germany) Walkenhorst Motorsport	(Germany) BMW	(New Zealand) Liam Lawson
4	R1	(Germany) Nürburgring (Sprint Circuit)	(South Africa) Kelvin van der Linde	(South Africa) Kelvin van der Linde	(South Africa) Kelvin van der Linde	(Germany) Team Abt Sportsline	(Germany) Audi	(South Africa) Sheldon van der Linde
4	R2	(Germany) Nürburgring (Sprint Circuit)	(Thailand) Alex Albon	(Germany) Christopher Haase	(Thailand) Alex Albon	(Italy) AlphaTauri AF Corse	(Italy) Ferrari	(Belgium) Esteban Muth
5	R1	(Austria) Red Bull Ring	(New Zealand) Liam Lawson	(Belgium) Esteban Muth	(New Zealand) Liam Lawson	(Italy) Red Bull AF Corse	(Italy) Ferrari	(New Zealand) Liam Lawson
5	R2	(Austria) Red Bull Ring	(Germany) Marco Wittmann	(Germany) Marco Wittmann	(New Zealand) Liam Lawson	(Italy) Red Bull AF Corse	(Italy) Ferrari	(New Zealand) Liam Lawson
6	R1	(Netherlands) TT Circuit Assen	(New Zealand) Liam Lawson	(Italy) Mirko Bortolotti	(Germany) Marco Wittmann	(Germany) Walkenhorst Motorsport	(Germany) BMW	(New Zealand) Liam Lawson
6	R2	(Netherlands) TT Circuit Assen	(Austria) Lucas Auer	(Germany) Mike Rockenfeller	(Austria) Lucas Auer	(United States) Mercedes-AMG Team Winward	(Germany) Mercedes-AMG	(New Zealand) Liam Lawson
7	R1	(Germany) Hockenheimring	(South Africa) Kelvin van der Linde	(Thailand) Alex Albon	(South Africa) Kelvin van der Linde	(Germany) Team Abt Sportsline	(Germany) Audi	(New Zealand) Liam Lawson
7	R2	(Germany) Hockenheimring	(South Africa) Kelvin van der Linde	(Thailand) Alex Albon	(Austria) Lucas Auer	(United States) Mercedes-AMG Team Winward	(Germany) Mercedes-AMG	(New Zealand) Liam Lawson
8	R1	(Germany) Norisring	(New Zealand) Liam Lawson	(Switzerland) Nico Müller	(Germany) Maximilian Götz	(Germany) Mercedes-AMG Team HRT	(Germany) Mercedes-AMG	(New Zealand) Liam Lawson
8	R2	(Germany) Norisring	(New Zealand) Liam Lawson	(New Zealand) Nick Cassidy	(Germany) Maximilian Götz	(Germany) Mercedes-AMG Team HRT	(Germany) Mercedes-AMG	(Germany) Sophia Flörsch

=== Scoring system ===
Points were awarded to the top ten classified finishers as follows:

Race Position	**1st**	**2nd**	**3rd**	**4th**	**5th**	**6th**	**7th**	**8th**	**9th**	**10th**
Points	25	18	15	12	10	8	6	4	2	1

Additionally, the top three placed drivers in qualifying also received points:

Qualifying Position	**1st**	**2nd**	**3rd**
Points	3	2	1

=== Drivers' championship ===
Pos.	Driver	MNZ (Italy)		LAU (Germany)		ZOL (Belgium)		NÜR (Germany)		RBR (Austria)		ASS (Netherlands)		HOC (Germany)		NOR (Germany)		Points
1	(Germany) Maximilian Götz	2^{3}	10	Ret	1^{3}	7^{2}	2	4	4	2^{2}	3	4^{3}	6	5	3	1	1	230
2	(New Zealand) Liam Lawson **J**	1	13^{2}	2	2^{2}	Ret	3	13	Ret	**1**^{1}	1^{2}	**3**^{1}	2^{3}	4^{3}	2	**3**^{1}	**NC**^{1}	227
3	(South Africa) Kelvin van der Linde	4	**1**^{1}	4^{2}	3	**1**^{1}	8	**1**^{1}	Ret	5	6	12	4	**1**^{1}	**10**^{1}	4^{2}	17^{2}	208
4	(Germany) Marco Wittmann	8	5	7	6	5^{3}	**1**^{1}	5^{3}	3^{3}	7	**2**^{1}	1^{2}	3^{2}	Ret	11	12	7	171
5	(Austria) Lucas Auer	12^{2}	3	6	9	9	5^{2}	11	6	8	5	10	**1**^{1}	Ret^{2}	1^{2}	6^{3}	2	152
6	(Thailand) Alex Albon	3	7	5	11	3	6	Ret	**1**^{1}	4	17	Ret	5	2	6			130
7	(Switzerland) Philip Ellis	Ret	6	1	**4**^{1}	8	16	2^{2}	Ret	3	4	7	12	7	4	10	10	129
8	(Germany) Mike Rockenfeller	9	8	3^{3}	8	2	10^{3}	3	Ret	15	Ret	13	11	3	15	Ret	4	89
9	(Spain) Daniel Juncadella	5^{1}	11	Ret	7	Ret	12	8	2^{2}	11	12	Ret	Ret	6	5	7	5	77
10	(Switzerland) Nico Müller	7	2	13	10	10	4	7	9	Ret	14	Ret	8	Ret	12	8	15	56
11	(South Africa) Sheldon van der Linde **J**	11	4^{3}	**9**^{1}	5	16	7	6	Ret	Ret	Ret^{3}	6	Ret	Ret	Ret	Ret	16	55
12	(India) Arjun Maini	13	Ret	Ret	12	Ret	DNS	10	13	6^{3}	7	Ret	13	Ret	8^{3}	2	6	48
13	(Belgium) Esteban Muth **J**	10	9	8	Ret	6	9	14	5	14	13	8	10	8	Ret	11	Ret	41
14	(Monaco) Vincent Abril	**DSQ**	DSQ	Ret	14	4	Ret	12	8	9	8	Ret	9	9	9	14	8	34
15	(Germany) Maximilian Buhk	6	12	10	18	Ret	11	Ret	Ret	12	9	Ret	15			9	3	28
16	(New Zealand) Nick Cassidy															5	13^{3}	11
17	(Germany) Timo Glock	16	Ret	11	13	11	17	19	7	10	10	Ret	14	10	14	Ret	11	9
18	(Germany) Sophia Flörsch **J**	15	15	Ret	15	15	Ret			17	15	9	16	12	Ret	13	9	8
19	(Germany) Marvin Dienst													11	7			6
20	(United Kingdom) Esmee Hawkey	14	16	Ret	16	13	13	17	11	16	16	11	Ret	14	16	Ret	Ret	2
21	(Germany) Christopher Haase							Ret	10									1
22	(United States) Dev Gore	Ret	14	12	17	14	15			Ret	Ret	DNS	17	16	17	16	14	0
23	(Germany) Markus Winkelhock							16	14									0
Guest drivers ineligible to score points
—	(Italy) Mirko Bortolotti											2	7					—
—	(Austria) Christian Klien					12	14	15	12			5	Ret					—
—	(Germany) Luca Stolz							9	Ret									—
—	(Germany) Maximilian Paul									13	11							—
—	(Brazil) Lucas di Grassi													15	Ret	15	12	—
—	(Germany) Hubert Haupt							18	Ret					13	13			—
—	(Germany) Michael Ammermüller							Ret	Ret									—
Pos.	Driver	MNZ (Italy)		LAU (Germany)		ZOL (Belgium)		NÜR (Germany)		RBR (Austria)		ASS (Netherlands)		HOC (Germany)		NOR (Germany)		Points

Colour	Result
Gold	Winner
Silver	Second place
Bronze	Third place
Green	Points classification
Blue	Non-points classification
Blue	Non-classified finish (NC)
Purple	Retired, not classified (Ret)
Red	Did not qualify (DNQ)
Red	Did not pre-qualify (DNPQ)
Black	Disqualified (DSQ)
White	Did not start (DNS)
White	Withdrew (WD)
White	Race cancelled (C)
Blank	Did not practice (DNP)
Blank	Did not arrive (DNA)
Blank	Excluded (EX)

**Bold** – Pole
Italics – Fastest Lap
1 – 3 Points for Pole
2 – 2 Points for P2
3 – 1 Point for P3

=== Teams' championship ===
Pos.	Team	Points
1	(Italy) Red Bull AlphaTauri AF Corse	368
2	(Germany) Team Abt Sportsline	296
3	(United States) Mercedes-AMG Team Winward	281
4	(Germany) Mercedes-AMG Team HRT	262
5	(Germany) Walkenhorst Motorsport	171
6	(Hong Kong) Mercedes-AMG Team GruppeM Racing	77
7	(Germany) ROWE Racing	64
8	(Germany) Team Rosberg	55
9	(Germany) Mercedes-AMG Team GetSpeed	48
10	(Germany) T3 Motorsport	43
11	(Germany) Mercedes-AMG Team Mücke Motorsport	34
12	(Germany) Team Abt	8

=== Manufacturers' championship ===
Only points scored by the top three drivers of a manufacturer in races count for the manufacturers' championship.

Pos.	Manufacturer	Points
1	(Germany) Mercedes-AMG	617
2	(Italy) Ferrari	368
3	(Germany) Audi	359
4	(Germany) BMW	235
5	(Italy) Lamborghini	43

== Bibliography ==
- Upietz, Tim (10 December 2021). DTM 2021: Das offizielle Jahrbuch. Duisburg: Gruppe C Motorsport Verlag. ISBN 978-3-948501-14-3.
