= Esteban Muth =

Belgian-German racing driver

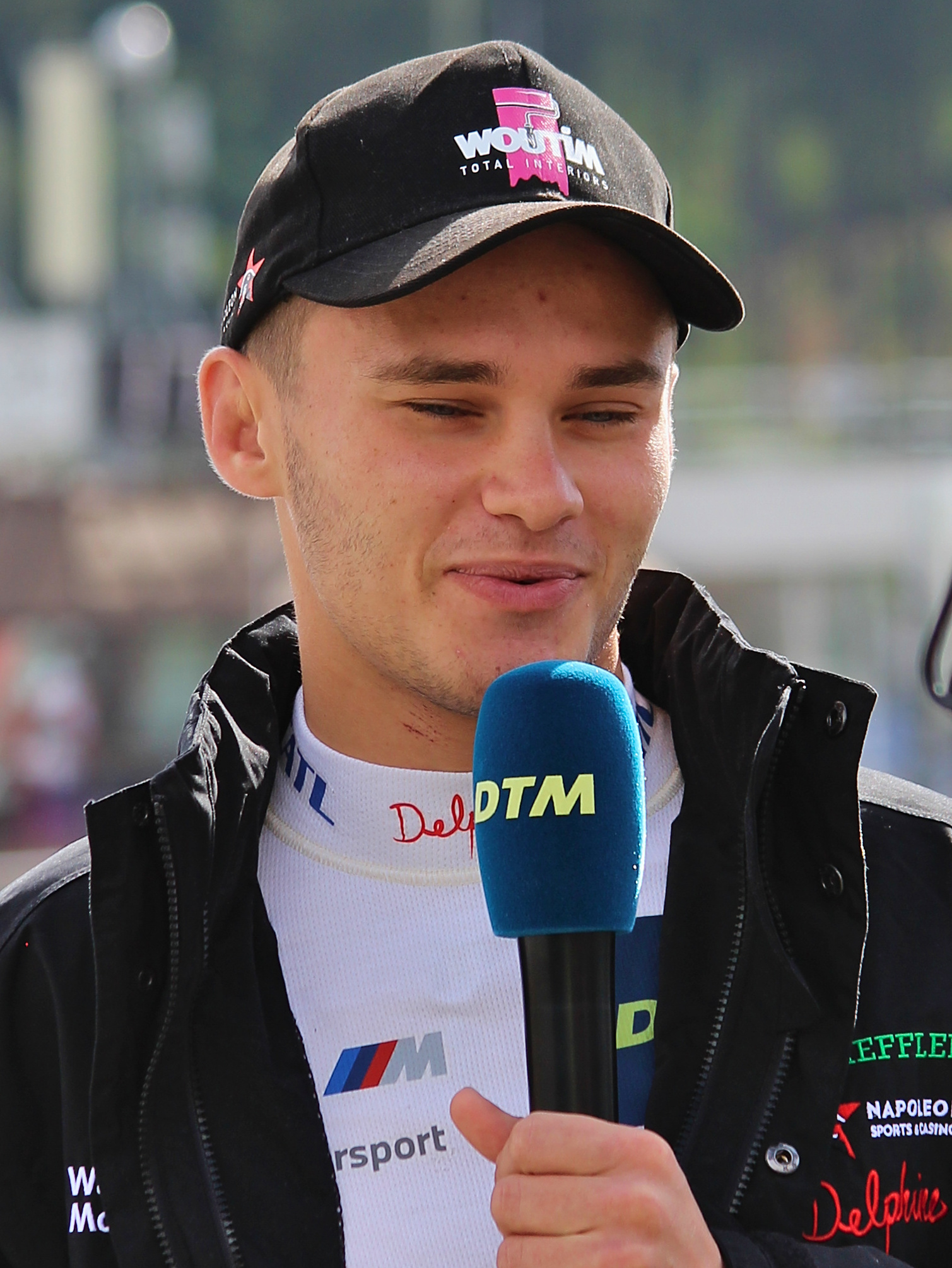
- Muth in 2022
- Nationality: (Belgium) Belgian (Germany) German via dual nationality
- Born: 30 October 2001 (age 25) Uccle, Brussels, Belgium
- Categorisation: FIA Silver

Esteban Muth (born 30 October 2001) is a Belgian-German racing driver who last drove for Walkenhorst Motorsport in Deutsche Tourenwagen Masters.

== Career ==
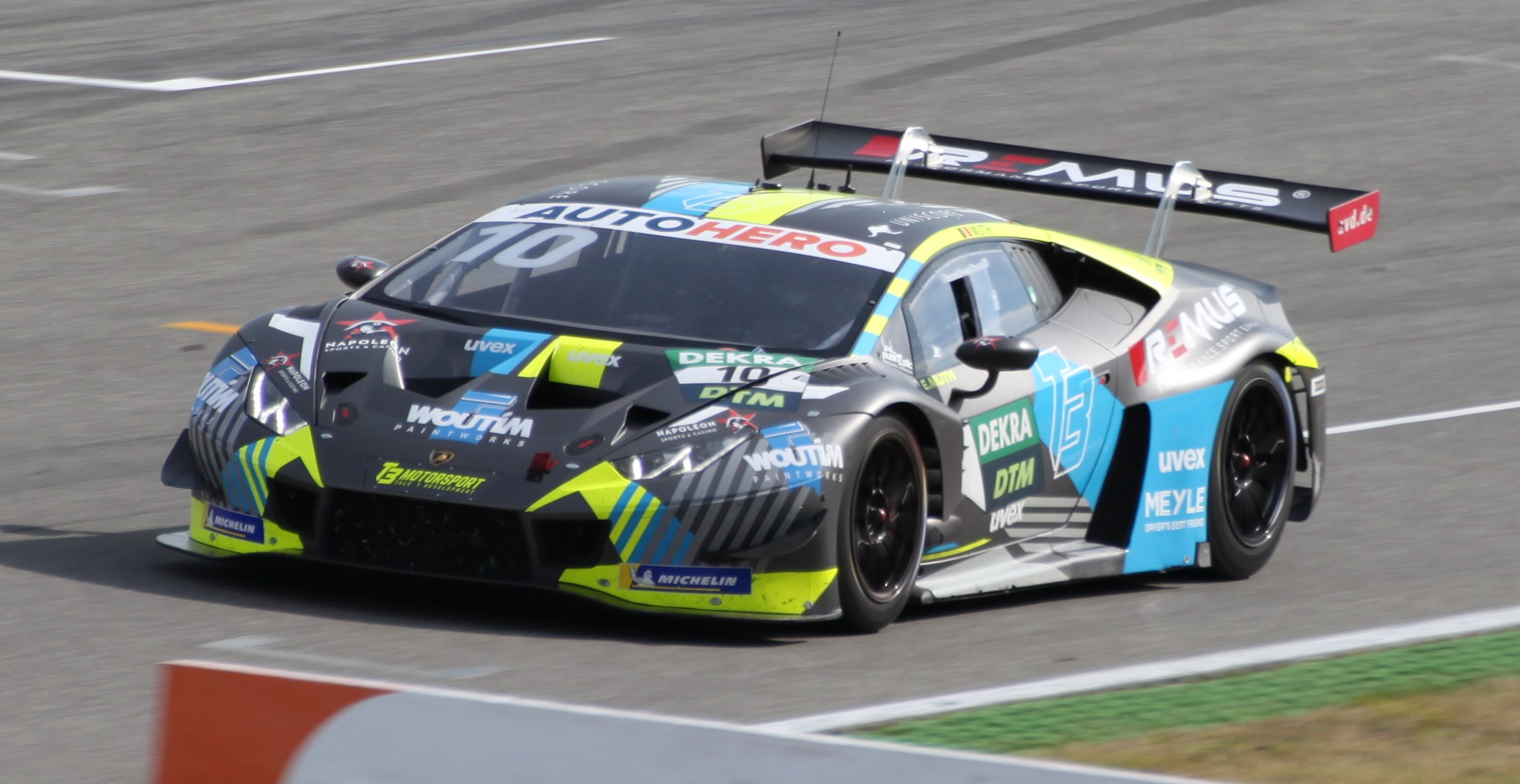
Esteban Muth at Hockenheim in 2021.

Muth made his motorsport debut in karting in 2010 and mainly competed in championships in Belgium and the Netherlands. In 2012, he won the Mini Parilla class of the Belgian Championship. In 2015, he started competing in international championships with a twelfth place in the KFJ class of the German ADAC Kart Masters. In 2016 and 2017, Muth competed in the OK Junior and OK classes respectively of both the European and World Karting Championships. In his senior year, he finished tenth in the world championship.

In 2018, Muth switched to formula racing, making his debut in the French F4 Championship. He won two races at the Circuit de Spa-Francorchamps and the Circuito Permanente de Jerez and also achieved podium finishes at the Circuit de Pau-Ville, Dijon-Prenois and Jerez. With 145.5 points, he finished seventh in the standings.

In 2019, Muth started the season in the Toyota Racing Series, where he drove for the M2 Competition team. He won a race at the Bruce McLaren Motorsport Park and was also on the podium at the Hampton Downs Motorsport Park and the Manfeild: Circuit Chris Amon. With 258 points, he finished fifth in the final standings. He then returned to Europe, where he made his debut in the Eurocup Formula Renault with M2. He only drove the first race weekend at the Autodromo Nazionale Monza, where he finished nineteenth and fifteenth. After this, he competed in a race weekend of the Japanese Formula 3 Championship with the OIRC team YTB by Carlin during the race weekend at the Sportsland Sugo as a one-time replacement for Charles Milesi, finishing the races in eleventh, eighth and tenth. At the end of the year, he drove a Mercedes-AMG GT3 in the race at the Circuit de Barcelona-Catalunya in a race of the Blancpain GT Series Endurance Cup for Strakka Racing, finishing nineteenth.

In 2020, Muth only drove two race weekends of the GT4 European Series with the Selleslagh Racing Team in a Mercedes-AMG GT4 at Spa and Circuit Paul Ricard. He was not eligible for points, but finished on the podium in both races at Spa.

In 2021, Muth made his DTM debut with the T3 Motorsport team in a Lamborghini Huracán GT3 Evo. He scored a total of 41 championship points and finished the season 13th in the drivers' championship. Ahead of his second season in the series in 2022, he moved to the Walkenhorst Motorsport team to drive a BMW M4 GT3 alongside Marco Wittmann.

For 2023, Muth joined Vanwall Racing Team as a test driver for their Le Mans Hypercar entry.

== Racing record ==
=== Career summary ===
Season	Series	Team	Races	Wins	Poles	F/Laps	Podiums	Points	Position
2018	French F4 Championship	FFSA Academy	21	2	0	2	5	145.5	7th
2018	Belcar Endurance Championship	QSR Racing School	1	0	0	0	0	76.5	21st
2019	Toyota Racing Series	M2 Competition	15	1	0	0	3	258	5th
2019	Formula Renault Eurocup	M2 Competition	2	0	0	0	0	0	25th
2019	Japanese Formula 3 Championship	OIRC team YTB	3	0	0	0	0	0	15th
2019	Blancpain GT Series Endurance Cup	Strakka Racing	1	0	0	0	0	0	57th
2020	GT4 European Series - Silver Cup	Selleslagh Racing Team	4	0	0	0	2	0	NC†
2021	Deutsche Tourenwagen Masters	T3 Motorsport	16	0	0	1	0	41	13th
2022	Deutsche Tourenwagen Masters	Walkenhorst Motorsport	11	0	0	0	0	0	29th
2022	Supercar Challenge - Supersport 2	Xwift Racing Events	2	1	1	2	2	41	12th
2023	FIA World Endurance Championship - Hypercar	Floyd Vanwall Racing Team	Reserve driver						
2024	GT World Challenge Europe Endurance Cup	Comtoyou Racing	3	0	0	0	0	0	NC
2024	GT World Challenge Europe Endurance Cup	Boutsen VDS	1	0	0	0	0	0	NC
2024	GT World Challenge Europe Endurance Cup - Silver Cup	Comtoyou Racing	1	0	0	0	0	2*	9th*

^{†} As Muth was a guest driver, he was ineligible to score points.
^{*} Season still in progress.

=== Complete French F4 Championship results ===
(key) (Races in bold indicate pole position) (Races in italics indicate fastest lap)

Year	1	2	3	4	5	6	7	8	9	10	11	12	13	14	15	16	17	18	19	20	21	Pos	Points
2018	NOG; 1; 8	NOG; 2 Ret	NOG; 3; 9	PAU; 1; 4	PAU; 2; 11	PAU; 3; 3	SPA; 1; 8	SPA; 2; 1	SPA; 3; 8	DIJ; 1; 7	DIJ; 2; 3	DIJ; 3; 12	MAG; 1; 4	MAG; 2; 10	MAG; 3; 7	JER; 1; 5	JER; 2; 1	JER; 3; 3	LEC; 1; 5	LEC; 2; 7	LEC; 3; 8	7th	145.5

=== Complete Formula Renault Eurocup results ===
(key) (Races in bold indicate pole position) (Races in italics indicate fastest lap)

Year	Team	1	2	3	4	5	6	7	8	9	10	11	12	13	14	15	16	17	18	19	20	Pos	Points
2019	M2 Competition	MNZ; 1; 19	MNZ; 2; 15	SIL; 1	SIL; 2	MON; 1	MON; 2	LEC; 1	LEC; 2	SPA; 1	SPA; 2	NÜR; 1	NÜR; 2	HUN; 1	HUN; 2	CAT; 1	CAT; 2	HOC; 1	HOC; 2	YMC; 1	YMC; 2	25th	0

=== Complete Toyota Racing Series results ===
(key) (Races in bold indicate pole position) (Races in italics indicate fastest lap)

Year	Team	1	2	3	4	5	6	7	8	9	10	11	12	13	14	15	16	17	DC	Points
2019	M2 Competition	HIG; 1; 6	HIG; 2; 4	HIG; 3; 11	TER; 1; 9	TER; 2 C	TER; 3 C	HMP; 1 Ret	HMP; 2; 6	HMP; 3; 2	HMP; 4; 5	TAU; 1; 7	TAU; 2; 6	TAU; 3; 1	TAU; 4; 4	MAN; 1; 6	MAN; 2; 3	MAN; 3; 5	5th	258

=== Complete Deutsche Tourenwagen Masters results ===
(key) (Races in bold indicate pole position) (Races in italics indicate fastest lap)

Year	Team	Car	1	2	3	4	5	6	7	8	9	10	11	12	13	14	15	16	Pos	Points
2021	T3 Motorsport	Lamborghini Huracán GT3 Evo	MNZ; 1; 10	MNZ; 2; 9	LAU; 1; 8	LAU; 2 Ret	ZOL; 1; 6	ZOL; 2; 9	NÜR; 1; 14	NÜR; 2; 5	RBR; 1; 14	RBR; 2; 13	ASS; 1; 8	ASS; 2; 10	HOC; 1; 8	HOC; 2 Ret	NOR; 1; 11	NOR; 2 Ret	13th	41
2022	Walkenhorst Motorsport	BMW M4 GT3	ALG; 1; 14	ALG; 2; 14	LAU; 1; 12	LAU; 2; 18	IMO; 1 Ret	IMO; 2; 14	NOR; 1 Ret	NOR; 2 DNS	NÜR; 1; 13	NÜR; 2; 15	SPA; 1; 13	SPA; 2; 24	RBR; 1	RBR; 2	HOC; 1	HOC; 2	29th	0

Muth was unable to attend the last two raceweekends of the 2022 season due to an urgent surgery he had to undergo right before the race at the Red Bull Ring.
