= Clemens Schmid =

Austrian racing driver (born 1990)

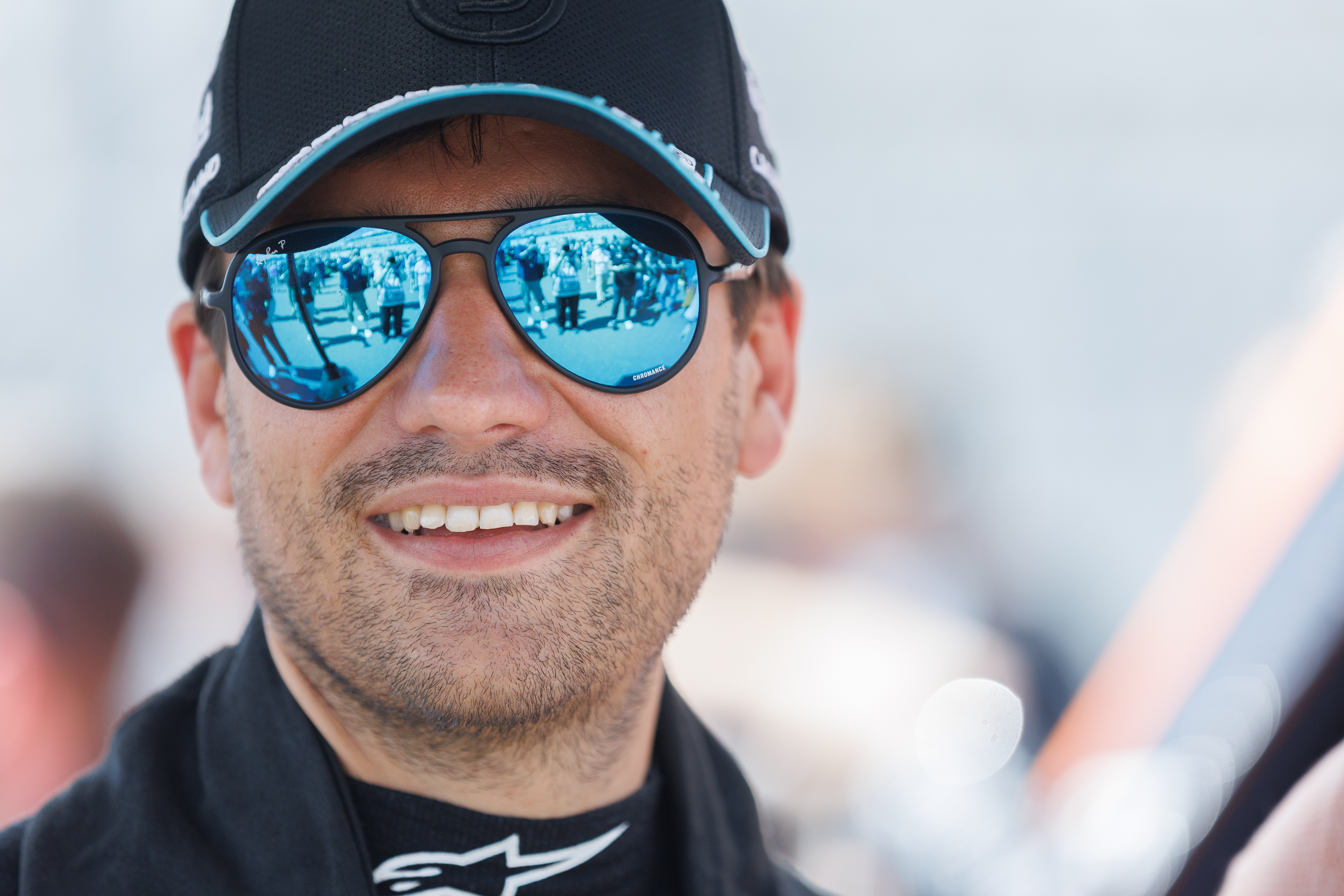
- Schmid in 2024
- Nationality: (Austria) Austrian
- Born: 18 August 1990 (age 36) Rum, Austria

Deutsche Tourenwagen Masters career
- Debut season: 2022
- Current team: GRT grasser-racing.com
- Categorisation: FIA Silver (until 2016, 2022–); FIA Gold (2017–2021)
- Car number: 85
- Starts: 47
- Wins: 0
- Podiums: 0
- Poles: 0
- Fastest laps: 0
- Best finish: 19th in 2023, 2024

Previous series
- 2015–2019, 2021 2010, 2015, 2018, 2020–2021 2017, 2019, 2021 2016, 2018 2011-2015 2010–2014 2011–2014: GT World Challenge Europe Endurance Cup; ADAC GT Masters; Intercontinental GT Challenge; VLN; Porsche Sprint Challenge Middle East; Porsche Carrera Cup Germany; Porsche Supercup

Championship titles
- 2012-13, 2014-15: Porsche Sprint Challenge Middle East

Clemens Schmid (born 18 August 1990) is an Austrian racing driver currently competing in the Deutsche Tourenwagen Masters and GT World Challenge Europe Endurance Cup with the GRT Grasser Racing Team.

== Career ==
=== Karting ===
Schmid began karting in 2000 by competing in the German Karting Championship.

=== Sports car racing ===
Schmid made his car racing debut in 2009 by competing in the BMW 325 Challenge.

In 2010, Schmid joined Seyffarth Motorsport to compete in the Porsche Carrera Cup Germany. He finished the season in eighteenth. He also joined the team in the third round of the ADAC GT Masters.

In 2011, Schmid joined Herberth Motorsport to compete in the Porsche Carrera Cup Germany. He finished the season in eighteenth once again. He also joined Lechner Racing as a guest driver in the final round of the Porsche Supercup at Yas Marina Circuit.

Schmid then competed in the 2011–12 Porsche GT3 Cup Challenge Middle East, where he finished third.

In 2012, Schmid remained with Lechner Racing to compete in the Porsche Carrera Cup Germany. He finished the season in thirteenth. He also joined the team for the Monaco round of the Porsche Supercup.

Schmid would then claim the title in the 2012–13 Porsche GT3 Cup Challenge Middle East title with Al Nabooda Racing after taking nine wins.

In 2013, Schmid competed in the Porsche Supercup as a part of the Lechner Racing Academy. He finished the season in seventeenth.

In the 2013–14 Porsche GT3 Cup Challenge Middle East, Schmid finished as runner-up.

In 2014, Schmid competed in both the Porsche Carrera Cup Germany and the Porsche Supercup with Lechner Racing. He finished eleventh in the A-class standings of the Carrera Cup Germany and the tenth in the drivers' standings of the Supercup. In the Supercup, he took one race win at Silverstone Circuit.

Schmid took his second Porsche GT3 Cup Challenge Middle East title in the 2014–15 season after taking seven wins during the season.

In 2015, Schmid joined Bentley Team HTP to compete in his first full season in the ADAC GT Masters. Schmid and his teammate Fabian Hamprecht took two podiums and finished nineteenth in the drivers' championship. Schmid also joined the team to compete in the 24 Hours of Spa and the 24 Hours of Nürburgring.

In 2016, Schmid remained with HTP Motorsport. He competed in both the Blancpain GT Series Endurance Cup and the Blancpain GT Series Sprint Cup. He set the pole position at the 24 Hours of Spa but was later disqualified along with all the other Mercedes-AMG cars.

In 2017, Schmid remained in both the Blancpain GT Series Endurance Cup and the Blancpain GT Series Sprint Cup, but switched teams to join ISR. In the Sprint Cup, he scored one second place at Circuit Zolder together with his teammate Filip Salaquarda.

In 2018, Schmid joined Auto Arena Motorsport to compete in the first three rounds of the ADAC GT Masters and the 24 Hours of Nürburgring. He then joined Attempto Racing to compete in the final two rounds of the Blancpain GT Series Endurance Cup.

In 2019, Schmid competed in the full Blancpain GT Series Endurance Cup for Attempto Racing.

In 2020, Schmid joined the GRT Grasser Racing Team to compete in the ADAC GT Masters with Niels Lagrange as his teammate. He finished the season in thirty-third.

In 2021, Schmid remained in the championship with the same team. His teammate for the season was Mike David Ortmann. This time Schmid came twenty-fourth in the drivers' championship. He also joined the team in the GT World Challenge Europe Endurance Cup.

In 2022, Schmid remained with the GRT Grasser Racing Team to compete in his first season of the Deutsche Tourenwagen Masters. He finished the season in twenty-second. His best finish of the season was a sixth place at Imola Circuit. In the final qualifying session of the season at the Hockenheimring, he took his best qualifying result by setting the second fastest time of the session.

In 2023, Schmid would the stay with the team for his second season in the Deutsche Tourenwagen Masters. He would also compete for the team in the GT World Challenge Europe Endurance Cup.

== Racing record ==
=== Karting career summary ===
Season	Series	Team	Position
2006	36° Torneo Industrie - ICA		34th
2006	German Kart Championship	KSB-Racing Team	25th
2007	German Challenger Kart Championship	KSB-Racing Team	19th
2007	Bridgestone Cup Europe - KF2		20th
2007	Italian Open Masters - KF2		36th
2008	Andrea Margutti Trophy - KF2	New Team Karting	29th
2008	Italian Open Masters - KF2	New Team Karting	N/A

=== Racing career summary ===
Season	Series	Team	Races	Wins	Poles	F/Laps	Podiums	Points	Position
2009	BMW 325 Challenge	Unterberger Racing	?	4	?	?	?	?	?
2010	Porsche Carrera Cup Germany	Seyffarth Motorsport	9	0	0	0	0	23	18th
2010	ADAC GT Masters	Seyffarth Motorsport	2	0	0	0	0	0	NC
2011	Porsche Carrera Cup Germany	Herberth Motorsport	9	0	0	0	0	19	18th
2011	Porsche Carrera World Cup	Herberth Motorsport	1	0	0	0	0	N/A	21st
2011	Porsche Supercup	Veltins Lechner Racing Team	1	0	0	0	0	0	NC†
2011–12	Porsche GT3 Cup Challenge Middle East		9	6	8	?	8	166	**3rd**
2012	Porsche Carrera Cup Germany	SWITCH IT Lechner Racing	17	0	0	0	0	68	13th
2012	Porsche Supercup	SWITCH IT Lechner Racing	1	0	0	0	0	0	NC†
2012–13	Porsche GT3 Cup Challenge Middle East	Al Nabooda Racing	12	9	9	8	11	276	**1st**
2013	Porsche Supercup	Lechner Racing Academy	9	0	0	0	0	24	17th
2013–14	Porsche GT3 Cup Challenge Middle East	Al Nabooda Racing	11	7	6	7	10	244	**2nd**
2014	Porsche Carrera Cup Germany	Lechner Racing Academy ME	18	0	1	0	1	93	11th
2014	Porsche Supercup	Walter Lechner Racing Team	10	1	1	0	1	69	10th
2014–15	Porsche GT3 Cup Challenge Middle East	Al Nabooda Racing	12	7	7	7	9	240	**1st**
2015	Blancpain Endurance Series - Pro-Am Cup	Bentley Team HTP	1	0	0	0	0	4	27th
2015	ADAC GT Masters	Bentley Team HTP	15	0	0	1	2	52	19th
2015	24 Hours of Nürburgring - SP9	Bentley Team HTP	1	0	0	0	0	N/A	8th
2015	24H Series - 997	Lechner Racing Middle East							
2015	24 Hours of Dubai - 997	Lechner Racing Middle East	1	0	0	0	1	N/A	**3rd**
2016	24H Series - A6	HTP Motorsport	1	0	0	0	0	0	NC†
2016	Blancpain GT Series Endurance Cup	HTP Motorsport	5	0	0	0	0	10	34th
2016	VLN Series - SP9	HTP Motorsport	4	0	0	0	0	0	NC†
2016	Blancpain GT Series Sprint Cup	HTP Motorsport	9	0	0	0	0	5	23rd
2017	Intercontinental GT Challenge	ISR	1	0	0	0	0	0	NC
2017	Blancpain GT Series Endurance Cup	ISR	4	0	0	0	0	6	28th
2017	Blancpain GT Series Sprint Cup	ISR	7	0	0	0	1	21	13th
2017	Gulf 12 Hours - GT	Attempto Racing	1	0	0	0	0	N/A	6th
2018	ADAC GT Masters	Auto Arena Motorsport	6	0	0	0	0	0	NC
2018	VLN Series - SP9 Pro	Auto Arena Motorsport	2	0	0	0	0	8.27	42nd
2018	24 Hours of Nürburgring - SP9	Auto Arena Motorsport	1	0	0	0	0	N/A	DNF
2018	Blancpain GT Series Endurance Cup	Attempto Racing	2	0	0	0	0	0	NC
2018	24H GT Series - A6	Attempto Racing							
2018	Gulf 12 Hours - GT3 Pro	Attempto Racing	1	0	0	0	1	N/A	**3rd**
2018	24 Hours of Dubai - A6	Attempto Racing	1	0	0	0	0	N/A	DNF
2019	Blancpain GT Series Endurance Cup	Attempto Racing	5	0	0	0	0	11	21st
2019	Blancpain GT World Challenge Europe	Attempto Racing	10	0	0	1	0	24.5	10th
2020	ADAC GT Masters	GRT Grasser Racing Team	14	0	0	0	0	15	33rd
2021	ADAC GT Masters	GRT Grasser Racing Team	14	0	0	0	0	31	24th
2021	GT World Challenge Europe Endurance Cup	GRT Grasser Racing Team	5	0	0	0	0	0	NC
2021	GT World Challenge Europe Endurance Cup - Silver Cup	GRT Grasser Racing Team	5	0	1	0	1	20	22nd
2021	Intercontinental GT Challenge	GRT Grasser Racing Team	1	0	0	0	0	0	NC
2022	Deutsche Tourenwagen Masters	GRT grasser-racing.com	16	0	0	0	0	11	22nd
2023	Deutsche Tourenwagen Masters	GRT Grasser Racing Team	16	0	0	0	0	32	19th
2023	GT World Challenge Europe Endurance Cup	GRT Grasser Racing Team	5	0	0	0	0	0	NC
2023	GT World Challenge Europe Endurance Cup - Silver Cup	GRT Grasser Racing Team	5	2	3	1	4	116	**1st**
2024	Deutsche Tourenwagen Masters	Dörr Motorsport	15	0	0	0	0	27	19th
2024	FIA World Endurance Championship - LMGT3	Akkodis ASP Team	3	0	0	0	0	3	30th
2025	FIA World Endurance Championship - LMGT3	Akkodis ASP Team	8	2	0	1	2	95	**3rd**
2026	FIA World Endurance Championship - LMGT3	Akkodis ASP Team	8	0	0	0	0	38	15th

† As he was a guest driver, Schmid was ineligible to score points.

=== Complete ADAC GT Masters results ===
(key) (Races in bold indicate pole position) (Races in italics indicate fastest lap)

Year	Team	Car	1	2	3	4	5	6	7	8	9	10	11	12	13	14	15	16	Pos.	Points
2010	Seyffarth Motorsport	Porsche 997 GT3 Cup	OSC; 1	OSC; 2	SAC; 1	SAC; 2	HOC; 1; 18	HOC; 2; 12	ASS; 1	ASS; 2	LAU; 1	LAU; 2	NÜR; 1	NÜR; 2	OSC; 1	OSC; 2			NC	0
2015	Bentley Team HTP	Bentley Continental GT3	OSC; 1; 16	OSC; 2 DNS	RBR; 1 Ret	RBR; 2; 8	SPA; 1; 14	SPA; 2; 17	LAU; 1; 7	LAU; 2; 9	NÜR; 1; 14	NÜR; 2; 9	SAC; 1; 13	SAC; 2; 2	ZAN; 1 Ret	ZAN; 2; 12	HOC; 1; 2	HOC; 2 Ret	19th	52
2018	AutoArenA Motorsport	Mercedes-AMG GT3	OSC; 1; 17	OSC; 2; 13	MST; 1 Ret	MST; 2; 21	RBR; 1; 23	RBR; 2; 20	NÜR; 1	NÜR; 2	ZAN; 1	ZAN; 2	SAC; 1	SAC; 2	HOC; 1	HOC; 2			NC	0
2020	GRT Grasser Racing Team	Lamborghini Huracán GT3 Evo	LAU; 1; 14	LAU; 2; 29†	NÜR; 1; 23	NÜR; 2; 15	HOC; 1 Ret	HOC; 2; 29†	SAC; 1; 25	SAC; 2; 13	RBR; 1; 9	RBR; 2 Ret	LAU; 1; 24†	LAU; 2; 20	OSC; 1; 18	OSC; 2; 15			33rd	15
2021	GRT Grasser Racing Team	Lamborghini Huracán GT3 Evo	OSC; 1; 25	OSC; 2; 16	RBR; 1; 17	RBR; 2; 11	ZAN; 1; 18	ZAN; 2; 14	LAU; 1; 5	LAU; 2; 14	SAC; 1; 15	SAC; 2; 13	HOC; 1; 13	HOC; 2; 13	NÜR; 1; 16	NÜR; 2; 14			24th	31

=== Complete GT World Challenge Europe results ===
==== GT World Challenge Europe Endurance Cup ====
(key) (Races in bold indicate pole position) (Races in italics indicate fastest lap)

Year	Team	Car	Class	1	2	3	4	5	6	7	Pos.	Points
2015	Bentley Team HTP	Bentley Continental GT3	Pro-Am	MNZ	SIL	LEC	SPA; 6H; 19	SPA; 12H; 45	SPA; 24H; Ret	NÜR	27th	4
2016	HTP Motorsport	Mercedes-AMG GT3	Pro	MNZ; 21	SIL; 5	LEC; 40	SPA; 6H; 47	SPA; 12H; 40	SPA; 24H; 21	NÜR; 25	34th	10
2017	ISR	Audi R8 LMS	Pro	MNZ; 29	SIL; Ret	LEC; 7	SPA; 6H; 59	SPA; 12H; 59	SPA; 24H; Ret	CAT	28th	6
2018	Attempto Racing	Audi R8 LMS	Pro	MNZ	SIL	LEC	SPA; 6H; 46	SPA; 12H; 36	SPA; 24H; 24	CAT; 11	NC	0
2019	Attempto Racing	Audi R8 LMS Evo	Pro	MNZ; 7	SIL; Ret	LEC; 8	SPA; 6H; 31	SPA; 12H; 30	SPA; 24H; 30	CAT; 10	21st	11
2021	GRT Grasser Racing Team	Lamborghini Huracán GT3 Evo	Silver	MNZ; 27	LEC; 16	SPA; 6H; 46	SPA; 12H; 35	SPA; 24H; Ret	**NÜR**; 35	CAT; 38	22nd	20
2023	GRT Grasser Racing Team	Lamborghini Huracán GT3 Evo 2	Silver	MNZ; Ret	**LEC**; 17	SPA; 6H; 24	SPA; 12H; 20	SPA; 24H; 17	**NÜR**; 17	**CAT**; 17	1st	116

==== GT World Challenge Europe Sprint Cup ====
(key) (Races in bold indicate pole position) (Races in italics indicate fastest lap)

Year	Team	Car	Class	1	2	3	4	5	6	7	8	9	10	Pos.	Points
2016	HTP Motorsport	Mercedes-AMG GT3	Pro	MIS; QR; DNS	MIS; CR; 19	BRH; QR; 4	BRH; CR; 19	NÜR; QR; 14	NÜR; CR; 23	HUN; QR; 19	HUN; CR; 12	CAT; QR; 20	CAT; CR; 9	23rd	5
2017	ISR	Audi R8 LMS	Pro	MIS; QR; 10	MIS; CR; 15	BRH; QR; 12	BRH; CR; Ret	ZOL; QR; 4	ZOL; CR; 2	HUN; QR; 17	HUN; CR; DNS	NÜR; QR	NÜR; CR	12th	21
2019	Attempto Racing	Audi R8 LMS Evo	Pro	BRH; 1; 5	BRH; 2; 4	MIS; 1; 7	MIS; 2; 14	ZAN; 1; 27	ZAN; 2; 24	NÜR; 1; 28	NÜR; 2; 12	HUN; 1; 4	HUN; 2; 10	10th	24.5

=== Complete Deutsche Tourenwagen Masters results ===
(key) (Races in bold indicate pole position) (Races in italics indicate fastest lap)

Year	Team	Car	1	2	3	4	5	6	7	8	9	10	11	12	13	14	15	16	Pos	Points
2022	GRT grasser-racing.com	Lamborghini Huracán GT3 Evo	ALG; 1; 21	ALG; 2; 19	LAU; 1; 17	LAU; 2 Ret	IMO; 1; 6	IMO; 2 Ret	NOR; 1; 10	NOR; 2; 17	NÜR; 1; 12	NÜR; 2 Ret	SPA; 1; 22	SPA; 2; 26	RBR; 1 Ret	RBR; 2; 17	HOC; 1 Ret	HOC; 2 Ret^{2}	22nd	11
2023	GRT Grasser Racing Team	Lamborghini Huracán GT3 Evo 2	OSC; 1; 12	OSC; 2; 5^{3}	ZAN; 1; 21	ZAN; 2 Ret	NOR; 1; 18	NOR; 2 Ret	NÜR; 1; 18	NÜR; 2 DSQ	LAU; 1; 11	LAU; 2 Ret^{3}	SAC; 1 Ret	SAC; 2; 17	RBR; 1; 25	RBR; 2; 6	HOC; 1; 12	HOC; 2; 24	19th	32
2024	Dörr Motorsport	McLaren 720S GT3 Evo	OSC; 1; 15	OSC; 2; 12	LAU; 1; 19	LAU; 2 Ret	ZAN; 1; 4^{2}	ZAN; 2 Ret	NOR; 1; 18	NOR; 2; 17	NÜR; 1; 20	NÜR; 2 DNS	SAC; 1 Ret	SAC; 2; 11	RBR; 1; 15	RBR; 2; 15	HOC; 1; 17	HOC; 2; 17	19th	27

=== Complete FIA World Endurance Championship results ===
(key) (Races in bold indicate pole position; races in italics indicate fastest lap)

Year	Entrant	Class	Car	Engine	1	2	3	4	5	6	7	8	Rank	Points
2024	Akkodis ASP Team	LMGT3	Lexus RC F GT3	Lexus 2UR-GSE 5.0 L V8	QAT	IMO	SPA; 10	LMS	SÃO; WD	COA; 9	FUJ; 11	BHR	30th	3
2025	Akkodis ASP Team	LMGT3	Lexus RC F GT3	Lexus 2UR-GSE 5.0 L V8	QAT; Ret	IMO; 4	SPA; Ret	LMS; 5	SÃO; 1	COA; NC	FUJ; 15	BHR; 1	3rd	95
2026	Akkodis ASP Team	LMGT3	Lexus RC F GT3	Lexus 2UR-GSE 5.0 L V8	IMO; Ret	SPA; 6	LMS; 4	SÃO; 7	COA; 13	FUJ; 11	CAT; 13	MNZ; Ret	15th	38

=== Complete 24 Hours of Le Mans results ===
Year	Team	Co-Drivers	Car	Class	Laps	Pos.	Class Pos.
2025	(France) Akkodis ASP Team	(Argentina) José María López (Romania) Petru Umbrărescu	Lexus RC F GT3	LMGT3	340	37th	5th
2026	(France) Akkodis ASP Team	(Argentina) José María López (Romania) Petru Umbrărescu	Lexus RC F GT3	LMGT3	335	36th	4th
