= Dev Gore =

American racing driver

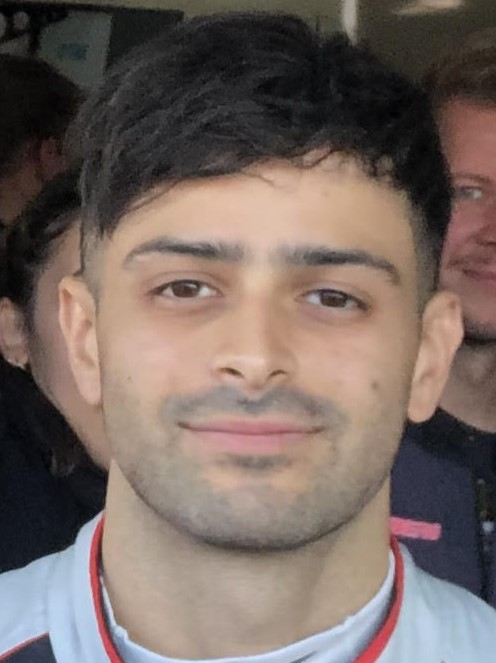
- Gore in 2022
- Nationality: (United States) American
- Born: 31 July 1997 (age 29) Oklahoma City, Oklahoma, U.S.

Deutsche Tourenwagen Masters career
- Debut season: 2021
- Current team: Team Rosberg
- Categorisation: FIA Silver
- Car number: 12
- Starts: 29
- Championships: 0
- Wins: 0
- Podiums: 1
- Poles: 0
- Fastest laps: 0
- Best finish: 17th in 2022

Previous series
- 2019 2019 2018 2017: Blancpain GT Endurance Cup; Toyota Racing Series; Euroformula Open; U.S. F2000

Dev Gore (born 31 July 1997 in Oklahoma City, Oklahoma) is an American professional racing driver competing in international motorsport. He has previously competed in the U.S. F2000 National Championship, the Deutsche Tourenwagen Masters, and the Nürburgring Langstrecken-Serie.

== Background ==
Gore started his racing career at the age of 18. After an initial taste of karting in 2015, he entered the Florida Winter Tour and the Rotax Grand Nationals in the DD2 category. In 2016, he moved into US DD2 National and US Open DD2 and was crowned champion. Gore raced for Team USA at the Rotax Grand Finals.

Gore is a graduate of Bertil Roos Racing School.

In 2021, Gore competed in the DTM for the Rosberg team. He called his car "Toothless" based on one of the two main characters from the film trilogy How to Train Your Dragon.

== Junior career ==
Gore was a participant in the MAXSpeed Driver Advancement Program in 2017 and made his debut in the Cooper Tires USF2000 Championship, part of the Mazda Road to Indy development program.

Gore finished the 2017 Cooper Tires USF2000 in 13th place in the overall standings, among a total of 36 drivers. He moved to the European racing scene in 2018, driving for Carlin in the second half of the Euroformula Open Championship. He finished in the top ten in four of eight occasions. During the following winter, Gore raced in the Toyota Racing Series with Giles Motorsport, scoring a best finish of fourth at Hampton Downs and finishing 13th in the standings.

== Sportscar career ==
In April 2019, it was announced that Gore would race with Strakka Racing in the Blancpain GT Endurance Cup. He drove in the opening three races, which included a fifth place at Silverstone alongside Jack Hawksworth and Lewis Williamson.

After a year out of racing, Gore entered the Deutsche Tourenwagen Masters in 2021 when the series switched to a GT3 rule set, driving an Audi R8 LMS Evo for Team Rosberg. Gore struggled throughout the year, scoring no points and qualifying no higher than 13th at Zolder. Despite being the only main driver to go without points throughout the year, he remained with the team for the 2022 season. Though qualifying still remained a weakness, Gore's results improved as he benefited from a timely pit stop during the safety car to rise up to the front at Imola, before going on to finish second. He also scored fourth place in a chaotic race at the Hockenheimring, helping him to finish 17th in the standings.

== Racing record ==
=== Career summary ===
Season	Series	Team	Races	Wins	Poles	F/Laps	Podiums	Points	Position
2017	U.S. F2000 National Championship	Exclusive Autosport	16	0	0	0	0	94	13th
2018	Euroformula Open Championship	Carlin Motorsport	8	0	0	0	0	11	17th
2019	Toyota Racing Series	Giles Motorsport	15	0	0	0	0	109	13th
2019	Blancpain GT Series Endurance Cup	Strakka Racing	3	0	0	0	0	10	23rd
2021	Deutsche Tourenwagen Masters	Team Rosberg	13	0	0	0	0	0	22nd
2022	Deutsche Tourenwagen Masters	Team Rosberg	16	0	0	0	1	30	17th
2023	Nürburgring Endurance Series - VT2-FWD	Walkenhorst Motorsport	4	0	0	0	1	0	NC†

^{†} As Gore was a guest driver, he was ineligible for championship points.

=== American open–wheel racing results ===
==== U.S. F2000 National Championship ====
Year	Team	1	2	3	4	5	6	7	8	9	10	11	12	13	14	Rank	Points
2017	Exclusive Autosport	STP; 17	STP; 16	BAR; 18	BAR; 17	IMS; 18	IMS; 23	ROA; 12	ROA; 11	IOW; 13	TOR; 12	TOR; 10	MOH; 10	MOH; 12	WGL; 17	13th	94

=== Complete Euroformula Open Championship results ===
(key) (Races in bold indicate pole position; races in italics indicate points for the fastest lap of top ten finishers)

Year	Entrant	1	2	3	4	5	6	7	8	9	10	11	12	13	14	15	16	DC	Points
2018	Carlin Motorsport	EST; 1	EST; 2	LEC; 1	LEC; 2	SPA; 1	SPA; 2	HUN; 1	HUN; 2	SIL; 1; 12	SIL; 2; 12	MNZ; 1; 9	MNZ; 2; 10	JER; 1; 11	JER; 2; 10	CAT; 1 Ret	CAT; 2; 10	17th	11

=== Complete Toyota Racing Series results ===
(key) (Races in bold indicate pole position) (Races in italics indicate fastest lap)

Year	Team	1	2	3	4	5	6	7	8	9	10	11	12	13	14	15	16	17	DC	Points
2019	Giles Motorsport	HIG; 1; 14	HIG; 2; 9	HIG; 3; 13	TER; 1; 10	TER; 2 C	TER; 3 C	HMP; 1; 4	HMP; 2; 13	HMP; 3; 14	HMP; 4; 14	TAU; 1; 12	TAU; 2; 9	TAU; 3; 14	TAU; 4; 12	MAN; 1; 11	MAN; 2 Ret	MAN; 3 Ret	13th	109

=== Complete Deutsche Tourenwagen Masters results ===
(key) (Races in bold indicate pole position) (Races in italics indicate fastest lap)

Year	Team	Car	1	2	3	4	5	6	7	8	9	10	11	12	13	14	15	16	Pos	Points
2021	Team Rosberg	Audi R8 LMS Evo	MNZ; 1 Ret	MNZ; 2; 14	LAU; 1; 12	LAU; 2; 17	ZOL; 1; 14	ZOL; 2; 15	NÜR; 1	NÜR; 2	RBR; 1 Ret	RBR; 2 Ret	ASS; 1 DNS	ASS; 2; 17	HOC; 1; 16	HOC; 2; 17	NOR; 1; 16	NOR; 2; 14	22nd	0
2022	Team Rosberg	Audi R8 LMS Evo II	ALG; 1 Ret	ALG; 2; 20	LAU; 1; 16	LAU; 2; 17	IMO; 1 Ret	IMO; 2; 2	NOR; 1 Ret	NOR; 2; 19	NÜR; 1 Ret	NÜR; 2 Ret	SPA; 1; 21	SPA; 2; 25	RBR; 1; 20	RBR; 2 Ret	HOC; 1; 4	HOC; 2; 11	17th	30
