= Alessi =

Alessi may refer to:

- Alessi (surname)
- Alessi (Italian company), a kitchenware company
- Alessi (JoJo's Bizarre Adventure), a minor character in the Japanese manga JoJo's Bizarre Adventure
- Alessi Bakery
- Alessi Brothers, an American pop music vocal duo

== See also ==
- Alessio, a given name
- Alex, a given name
- Alexey, a given name
- Alexis (disambiguation)
