= Alessio =

- Pronunciation: Italian: [aˈlɛssjo]
- Gender: male
- Language: Italian

Other names
- See also: Alexis, Alexius, Alexei, Alessia

Alessio is an Italian male name, Italian form of Alexius.

== Individuals with the given name Alessio ==
- Alessio Ascalesi (1872–1952), Italian cardinal
- Alessio Bandieri (born 1974), Italian footballer
- Alessio Boni (born 1966), Italian actor
- Alessio Cacciamani (born 2007), Italian footballer
- Alessio Castro-Montes (born 1997), Belgian footballer
- Alessio Cerci (born 1987), Italian footballer
- Alessio Cragno (born 1994), Italian footballer
- Alessio Da Cruz (born 1997), Dutch footballer
- Alessio Deledda (born 1994), Italian racing driver
- Alessio Di Chirico (born 1989), Italian martial artist
- Alessio di Giovanni (1872–1946), Italian poet
- Alessio di Savino (born 1984), Italian boxer
- Alessio Donnarumma (born 1998), Italian footballer
- Alessio Figalli (born 1984), Italian mathematician (Fields medalist)
- Alessio Furlanetto (born 2002), Italian footballer
- Alessio Lapice (born 1991), actor
- Alessio Locatelli (born 1978), Italian footballer
- Alessio Lorandi (born 1998), Italian racing driver
- Alessio Miggiano (2002), Swiss alpine ski racer
- Alessio Milivojevic (born 2005), American football player
- Alessio Mininni (born 1997), Italian singer-songwriter
- Alessio Morosin (born 1955), Italian lawyer
- Alessio Riccardi (born 2001), Italian footballer
- Miguel Alessio Robles, Mexican lawyer
- Alessio Romagnoli (born 1995), Italian footballer
- Alessio Sakara (born 1981), Italian martial artist
- Alessio Sestu (born 1983), Italian footballer
- Alessio Tacchinardi (born 1975), Italian footballer
- Alessio Vacca (born 2005), Italian footballer
- Alessio Vrioni (born 2004), Italian footballer
- Alessio Pozzi (born 1995), Italian model

== Individuals with the surname Alessio ==
- Angelo Alessio (born 1965), Italian football coach
- Ángela Alessio Robles (1917–2004), Mexican civil engineer and town planner
- Carlo Luciano Alessio (1919–2006), Italian mycologist
- Harry Alessio (1895–1973), former Australian rules footballer
- Steven Alessio (born 1971), former Australian rules footballer
- Dom Alessio (born 1983), Australian radio personality
- John Alessio (born 1979), Canadian professional mixed martial artist
- Simone Alessio (born 2000), Italian taekwondo athlete
- Vito Alessio Robles (1879–1957), Mexican general
