= Alesci =

Alesci is a surname. Notable people with the surname include:

- Cristina Alesci, American journalist

== See also ==
- Alessi (surname)
