= 2021 Baku Formula 2 round =

(Azerbaijan) 2021 Baku Formula 2 round
Round details
- Round 3 of 8 in the 2021 FIA Formula 2 Championship.
- Location: Baku City Circuit, Baku, Azerbaijan
- Course: Street Circuit; 6.003 km (3.730 mi)

Sprint race 1
- Date: 5 June 2021
- Laps: 21
Podium
First	(Russia) Robert Shwartzman	Prema Racing
Second	(United Kingdom) Dan Ticktum	Carlin
Third	(China) Zhou Guanyu	UNI-Virtuosi
Fastest lap
Driver	(France) Théo Pourchaire	ART Grand Prix
- Time: 1:56.928 (on lap 21)

Sprint race 2
- Date: 5 June 2021
- Laps: 21
Podium
First	(Estonia) Jüri Vips	Hitech Grand Prix
Second	(Germany) David Beckmann	Charouz Racing System
Third	(India) Jehan Daruvala	Carlin
Fastest lap
Driver	(Australia) Oscar Piastri	Prema Racing
- Time: 1:56.020 (on lap 16)

Feature race
- Date: 6 June 2021
- Laps: 28
Pole position
Driver	(New Zealand) Liam Lawson	Hitech Grand Prix
Time	1:54.217	
Podium
First	(Estonia) Jüri Vips	Hitech Grand Prix
Second	(Australia) Oscar Piastri	Prema Racing
Third	(Russia) Robert Shwartzman	Prema Racing
Fastest lap
Driver	(United Kingdom) Dan Ticktum	Carlin
- Time: 1:55.199 (on lap 24)

The 2021 Baku Formula 2 round was the 3rd race of the 2021 Formula 2 Championship and took place at the Baku City Circuit from 4 to 6 June. It ran in support of the 2021 Azerbaijan Grand Prix and featured three races, including the 100th FIA Formula 2 race on June 5 for sprint race 2.

With Jüri Vips winning Sprint Race 2 and Feature Race respectively, it marked the first time in the series' history that a driver was able to win two races in a weekend.

== Background ==
Matteo Nannini, who had previously withdrawn from Formula 2 to focus on the FIA Formula 3 Championship, was called in by Campos Racing to replace Gianluca Petecof.

== Classification ==
=== Qualifying ===
Pos.	No.	Driver	Team	Time	Gap	Grid
1	7	(New Zealand) Liam Lawson	Hitech Grand Prix	1:54.217		1
2	8	(Estonia) Jüri Vips	Hitech Grand Prix	1:54.355	+0.138	2
3	2	(Australia) Oscar Piastri	Prema Racing	1:54.508	+0.291	3
4	10	(France) Théo Pourchaire	ART Grand Prix	1:54.639	+0.422	4
5	5	(United Kingdom) Dan Ticktum	Carlin	1:54.830	+0.422	5
6	17	(New Zealand) Marcus Armstrong	DAMS	1:54.914	+0.697	6
7	21	(Switzerland) Ralph Boschung	Campos Racing	1:54.962	+0.745	7
8	3	(China) Guanyu Zhou	UNI-Virtuosi	1:55.112	+0.895	8
9	6	(India) Jehan Daruvala	Carlin	1:55.122	+0.905	9
10	1	(Russia) Robert Shwartzman	Prema Racing	1:55.161	+0.944	10
11	4	(Brazil) Felipe Drugovich	UNI-Virtuosi	1:55.173	+0.956	11
12	9	(Denmark) Christian Lundgaard	ART Grand Prix	1:55.245	+1.028	12
13	14	(Germany) David Beckmann	Charouz Racing System	1:55.336	+1.119	13
14	22	(United Kingdom) Jack Aitken	HWA Racelab	1:55.651	+1.434	14
15	24	(Netherlands) Bent Viscaal	Trident	1:55.658	+1.441	15
16	11	(Netherlands) Richard Verschoor	MP Motorsport	1:55.988	+1.771	16
17	20	(Italy) Matteo Nannini	Campos Racing	1:56.463	+2.246	17
18	12	(Germany) Lirim Zendeli	MP Motorsport	1:56.579	+2.362	18
19	25	(Japan) Marino Sato	Trident	1:57.539	+3.322	19
20	15	(Brazil) Guilherme Samaia	Charouz Racing System	1:57.793	+3.576	20
21	23	(Italy) Alessio Deledda	HWA Racelab	1:58.264	+4.047	21
107% time: 2:02.212
—	16	(Israel) Roy Nissany	DAMS	No time set	N/A	22

=== Sprint race 1 ===
Pos.	No.	Driver	Entrant	Laps	Time/Retired	Grid	Points
1	1	(Russia) Robert Shwartzman	Prema Racing	21	44:35.734	1	15
2	5	(United Kingdom) Dan Ticktum	Carlin	21	+5.144	6	12
3	3	(China) Zhou Guanyu	UNI-Virtuosi	21	+8.872	3	10
4	6	(India) Jehan Daruvala	Carlin	21	+10.352	2	8
5	10	(France) Théo Pourchaire	ART Grand Prix	21	+11.039	7	6 (2)
6	21	(Switzerland) Ralph Boschung	Campos Racing	21	+13.124	4	4
7	17	(New Zealand) Marcus Armstrong	DAMS	21	+14.455	5	2
8	8	(Estonia) Jüri Vips	Hitech Grand Prix	21	+14.524	9	1
9	14	(Germany) David Beckmann	Charouz Racing System	21	+17.299	12	
10	24	(Netherlands) Bent Viscaal	Trident	21	+17.764	13	
11	9	(Denmark) Christian Lundgaard	ART Grand Prix	21	+19.738	12	
12	11	(Netherlands) Richard Verschoor	MP Motorsport	21	+21.064	14	
13	12	(Germany) Lirim Zendeli	MP Motorsport	21	+21.837	18	
14	4	(Brazil) Felipe Drugovich	UNI-Virtuosi	21	+25.849^{1}	11	
15	20	(Italy) Matteo Nannini	Campos Racing	21	+35.970	16	
16	16	(Israel) Roy Nissany	DAMS	21	+42.471	22	
17	15	(Brazil) Guilherme Samaia	Charouz Racing System	21	+49.289	21	
18	25	(Japan) Marino Sato	Trident	21	+1:31.300	20	
DNF	2	(Australia) Oscar Piastri	Prema Racing	0	Collision damage	8	
DNF	7	(New Zealand) Liam Lawson	Hitech Grand Prix	0	Collision	10	
DNF	22	(United Kingdom) Jack Aitken	HWA Racelab	0	Collision	17	
DNF	23	(Italy) Alessio Deledda	HWA Racelab	0	Collision	19	
Fastest lap： (France) Théo Pourchaire − ART Grand Prix − 1:56.928 (lap 21)

Notes

- ^1 – Felipe Drugovich originally finished ninth, but was given a 10-second penalty for causing a collision with Liam Lawson on the first lap. He also received two penalty points.

=== Sprint race 2 ===
Pos.	No.	Driver	Entrant	Laps	Time/Retired	Grid	Points
1	8	(Estonia) Jüri Vips	Hitech Grand Prix	21	46:05.704	3	15
2	14	(Germany) David Beckmann	Charouz Racing System	21	+3.260	2	12
3	6	(India) Jehan Daruvala	Carlin	21	+3.883	7	10
4	24	(Netherlands) Bent Viscaal	Trident	21	+4.644	1	8
5	1	(Russia) Robert Shwartzman	Prema Racing	21	+5.002	10	6
6	5	(United Kingdom) Dan Ticktum	Carlin	21	+6.213	9	4
7	7	(New Zealand) Liam Lawson	Hitech Grand Prix	21	+6.751	20	2
8	2	(Australia) Oscar Piastri	Prema Racing	21	+9.138	19	1 (2)
9	10	(France) Théo Pourchaire	ART Grand Prix	21	+13.315	6	
10	4	(Brazil) Felipe Drugovich	UNI-Virtuosi	21	+15.473	14	
11	20	(Italy) Matteo Nannini	Campos Racing	21	+17.975	15	
12	22	(United Kingdom) Jack Aitken	HWA Racelab	21	+22.828	21	
13	25	(Japan) Marino Sato	Trident	21	+25.675	18	
14	15	(Brazil) Guilherme Samaia	Charouz Racing System	21	+49.981	17	
15	23	(Italy) Alessio Deledda	HWA Racelab	21	+52.037	22	
16	16	(Israel) Roy Nissany	DAMS	21	+1:31.818	16	
DNF	17	(New Zealand) Marcus Armstrong	DAMS	7	Accident	4	
DNF	9	(Denmark) Christian Lundgaard	ART Grand Prix	7	Collision	11	
DNF	11	(Netherlands) Richard Verschoor	MP Motorsport	5	Collision	12	
DNF	21	(Switzerland) Ralph Boschung	Campos Racing	0	Collision	5	
DNF	3	(China) Zhou Guanyu	UNI-Virtuosi	0	Collision	8	
DNF	12	(Germany) Lirim Zendeli	MP Motorsport	0	Collision	13	
Fastest lap： (Australia) Oscar Piastri − Prema Racing − 1:56.020 (lap 16)

=== Feature Race ===
Pos.	No.	Driver	Entrant	Laps	Time/Retired	Grid	Points
1	8	(Estonia) Jüri Vips	Hitech Grand Prix	28	57:08.634	2	25
2	2	(Australia) Oscar Piastri	Prema Racing	28	+6.152^{3}	3	18
3	1	(Russia) Robert Shwartzman	Prema Racing	28	+12.623	10	15
4	4	(Brazil) Felipe Drugovich	UNI-Virtuosi	28	+22.400	11	12
5	21	(Switzerland) Ralph Boschung	Campos Racing	28	+24.418	7	10
6	7	(New Zealand) Liam Lawson	Hitech Grand Prix	28	+26.207	1	8 (4)
7	6	(India) Jehan Daruvala	Carlin	28	+28.081	9	6
8	5	(United Kingdom) Dan Ticktum	Carlin	28	+29.801	5	4 (2)
9	9	(Denmark) Christian Lundgaard	ART Grand Prix	28	+34.058	12	2
10	12	(Germany) Lirim Zendeli	MP Motorsport	28	+36.167	18	1
11	22	(United Kingdom) Jack Aitken	HWA Racelab	28	+36.993	14	
12	14	(Germany) David Beckmann	Charouz Racing System	28	+39.973	13	
13	3	(China) Guanyu Zhou	UNI-Virtuosi	28	+47.934	8	
14	11	(Netherlands) Richard Verschoor	MP Motorsport	28	+48.794	16	
15	25	(Japan) Marino Sato	Trident	28	+55.485	19	
16	16	(Israel) Roy Nissany	DAMS	28	+55.825	22	
17	24	(Netherlands) Bent Viscaal	Trident	28	+56.970	15	
18	15	(Brazil) Guilherme Samaia	Charouz Racing System	27	+1 lap	20	
19	23	(Italy) Alessio Deledda	HWA Racelab	27	+1 lap	21	
DNF	10	(France) Théo Pourchaire	ART Grand Prix	1	Collision	4	
DNF	17	(New Zealand) Marcus Armstrong	DAMS	0	Collision	6	
DNS	20	(Italy) Matteo Nannini	Campos Racing	—	Stalled^{2}	17	
Fastest lap： (United Kingdom) Dan Ticktum − Carlin − 1:55.199 (lap 24)

Notes

- ^2 - Matteo Nannini failed to start the Feature Race after stalling on the grid at the formation lap.
- ^3 - Oscar Piastri was given a five-second-time penalty for an unsafe release during his mandatory pit stop.

== Standings after the event ==
Drivers' Championship standings

	Pos.	Driver	Points
	1	(China) Guanyu Zhou	78
	2	(Australia) Oscar Piastri	73
3	3	(Russia) Robert Shwartzman	66
6	4	(Estonia) Jüri Vips	63
1	5	(United Kingdom) Dan Ticktum	60

Teams' Championship standings

	Pos.	Team	Points
1	1	(Italy) Prema Racing	139
1	2	(United Kingdom) UNI-Virtuosi Racing	119
2	3	(United Kingdom) Hitech Grand Prix	113
1	4	(United Kingdom) Carlin	113
1	5	(France) ART Grand Prix	73

- Note: Only the top five positions are included for both sets of standings.

== See also ==
- 2021 Azerbaijan Grand Prix

Previous round: 2021 Monte Carlo Formula 2 round	FIA Formula 2 Championship; 2021 season	Next round: 2021 Silverstone Formula 2 round
Previous round: 2019 Baku Formula 2 round	Baku Formula 2 round	Next round: 2022 Baku Formula 2 round
