= 2021 Monte Carlo Formula 2 round =

Second round of the 2021 FIA Formula 2 Championship

2021 Monaco Formula 2 round
Round details
- Round 2 of 8 in the 2021 FIA Formula 2 Championship.
- Location: Circuit de Monaco, Monte-Carlo, Monaco
- Course: Temporary racing facility 3.337 km (2.074 mi)

Sprint Race 1
- Date: 21 May 2021
- Laps: 30
Podium
First	(China) Guanyu Zhou	UNI-Virtuosi
Second	(Brazil) Felipe Drugovich	UNI-Virtuosi
Third	(Israel) Roy Nissany	DAMS
Fastest lap
Driver	(Estonia) Jüri Vips	Hitech Grand Prix
- Time: 1:22.125 (on lap 22)

Sprint Race 2
- Date: 22 May 2021
- Laps: 28
Podium
First	(United Kingdom) Dan Ticktum	Carlin
Second	(Australia) Oscar Piastri	Prema Racing
Third	(Estonia) Jüri Vips	Hitech Grand Prix
Fastest lap
Driver	(Russia) Robert Shwartzman	Prema Racing
- Time: 1:30.728 (on lap 28)

Feature Race
- Date: 22 May 2021
- Laps: 42
Pole position
Driver	(France) Théo Pourchaire	ART Grand Prix
Time	1:20.985	
Podium
First	(France) Théo Pourchaire	ART Grand Prix
Second	(Australia) Oscar Piastri	Prema Racing
Third	(Brazil) Felipe Drugovich	UNI-Virtuosi
Fastest lap
Driver	(China) Zhou Guanyu	UNI-Virtuosi
- Time: 1:21.912 (on lap 42)

The 2021 Monaco Formula 2 round was a couple of motor races for Formula 2 cars that took place on 21–22 May 2021 at the Circuit de Monaco in Monte Carlo, Monaco as part of the FIA Formula 2 Championship. It was the second round of the 2021 FIA Formula 2 Championship and ran in support of the 2021 Monaco Grand Prix.

By winning the Feature Race in the principality, Théo Pourchaire thus became the youngest race winner in Formula 2 history aged 17 years and 264 days, beating the previous record of Lando Norris.

== Background ==
=== Driver changes ===
Jack Aitken returned to Formula 2 as a replacement for Matteo Nannini for HWA Racelab, who decided to fully concentrate on his campaign in Formula 3 due to sponsorship issues.

== Classification ==
=== Qualifying ===
==== Group A ====
Pos.	No.	Driver	Team	Time	Gap	Grid
1	10	(France) Théo Pourchaire	ART Grand Prix	1:20.985	–	1
2	2	(Australia) Oscar Piastri	Prema Racing	1:21.443	+0.458	3
3	8	(Estonia) Jüri Vips	Hitech Grand Prix	1:21.523	+0.538	5
4	16	(Israel) Roy Nissany	DAMS	1:22.102	+1.117	7
5	4	(Brazil) Felipe Drugovich	UNI-Virtuosi	1:22.131	+1.146	9
6	6	(India) Jehan Daruvala	Carlin	1:22.244	+1.259	11
7	14	(Germany) David Beckmann	Charouz Racing System	1:22.585	+1.600	13
8	24	(Netherlands) Bent Viscaal	Trident	1:22.827	+1.842	15
9	12	(Germany) Lirim Zendeli	MP Motorsport	1:22.933	+1.948	17
10	20	(Brazil) Gianluca Petecof	Campos Racing	1:23.344	+2.359	19
11	22	(United Kingdom) Jack Aitken	HWA Racelab	1:23.353	+2.368	21

==== Group B ====
Pos.	No.	Driver	Team	Time	Gap	Grid
1	1	(Russia) Robert Shwartzman	Prema Racing	1:21.403	–	2
2	5	(United Kingdom) Dan Ticktum	Carlin	1:21.589	+0.186	4
3	21	(Switzerland) Ralph Boschung	Campos Racing	1:21.854	+0.451	6
4	9	(Denmark) Christian Lundgaard	ART Grand Prix	1:21.877	+0.474	8
5	3	(China) Guanyu Zhou	UNI-Virtuosi	1:21.912	+0.509	10
6	7	(New Zealand) Liam Lawson	Hitech Grand Prix	1:21.941	+0.538	12
7	17	(New Zealand) Marcus Armstrong	DAMS	1:22.168	+0.765	14
8	11	(Netherlands) Richard Verschoor	MP Motorsport	1:22.758	+1.355	16
9	25	(Japan) Marino Sato	Trident	1:24.091	+2.688	18
10	15	(Brazil) Guilherme Samaia	Charouz Racing System	1:24.302	+2.899	20
107% time: 1:26.540
—	23	(Italy) Alessio Deledda	HWA Racelab	1:27.744	+6.341	22^{1}

Notes

- ^1 – Alessio Deledda was not able to set a time within 107%, but was later given permission to start both Sprint Race 1 and the Feature Race from the back of the grid.

=== Sprint race 1 ===
Pos.	No.	Driver	Entrant	Laps	Time/Retired	Grid	Points
1	3	(China) Guanyu Zhou	UNI-Virtuosi	30	44:21.272	1	15
2	4	(Brazil) Felipe Drugovich	UNI-Virtuosi	30	+2.396	2	12
3	16	(Israel) Roy Nissany	DAMS	30	+5.909	4	10
4	21	(Switzerland) Ralph Boschung	Campos Racing	30	+7.430	5	8
5	8	(Estonia) Jüri Vips	Hitech Grand Prix	30	+11.007	6	6 (2)
6	5	(United Kingdom) Dan Ticktum	Carlin	30	+11.495	7	4
7	10	(France) Théo Pourchaire	ART Grand Prix	30	+13.247	10	2
8	2	(Australia) Oscar Piastri	Prema Racing	30	+15.247	8	1
9	7	(New Zealand) Liam Lawson	Hitech Grand Prix	30	+17.514	12	
10	17	(New Zealand) Marcus Armstrong	DAMS	30	+18.947	14	
11	6	(India) Jehan Daruvala	Carlin	30	+19.290	11	
12	14	(Germany) David Beckmann	Charouz Racing System	30	+19.546	13	
13	11	(Netherlands) Richard Verschoor	MP Motorsport	30	+19.915	16	
14	24	(Netherlands) Bent Viscaal	Trident	30	+20.234	15	
15	12	(Germany) Lirim Zendeli	MP Motorsport	30	+20.755	17	
16	22	(United Kingdom) Jack Aitken	HWA Racelab	30	+21.168	21	
17	15	(Brazil) Guilherme Samaia	Charouz Racing System	30	+21.873	20	
18	23	(Italy) Alessio Deledda	HWA Racelab	29	+1 lap	22	
19	25	(Japan) Marino Sato	Trident	28	Accident	18	
DNF	20	(Brazil) Gianluca Petecof	Campos Racing	23	Accident	19	
DNF	9	(Denmark) Christian Lundgaard	ART Grand Prix	14	Oil leak	3	
DNF	1	(Russia) Robert Shwartzman	Prema Racing	1	Collision damage	9	
Fastest lap： (Estonia) Jüri Vips − Hitech Grand Prix − 1:22.125 (lap 22)

=== Sprint race 2 ===
Pos.	No.	Driver	Entrant	Laps	Time/Retired	Grid	Points
1	5	(United Kingdom) Dan Ticktum	Carlin	28	47:53.826	5	15
2	2	(Australia) Oscar Piastri	Prema Racing	28	+0.765	3	12
3	8	(Estonia) Jüri Vips	Hitech Grand Prix	28	+1.172	6	10
4	10	(France) Théo Pourchaire	ART Grand Prix	28	+2.101	4	8
5	21	(Switzerland) Ralph Boschung	Campos Racing	28	+6.268	7	6
6	11	(Netherlands) Richard Verschoor	MP Motorsport	28	+8.381	13	4
7	12	(Germany) Lirim Zendeli	MP Motorsport	28	+13.384	15	2
8	6	(India) Jehan Daruvala	Carlin	28	+15.894	11	1
9	22	(United Kingdom) Jack Aitken	HWA Racelab	28	+16.310	16	
10	1	(Russia) Robert Shwartzman	Prema Racing	28	+39.225	22	(2)
11	24	(Netherlands) Bent Viscaal	Trident	28	+1:03.889	14	
12	23	(Italy) Alessio Deledda	HWA Racelab	27	+1 lap	18	
13	15	(Brazil) Guilherme Samaia	Charouz Racing System	27	+1 lap	17	
14	4	(Brazil) Felipe Drugovich	UNI-Virtuosi	26	+2 laps	9	
15	3	(China) Guanyu Zhou	UNI-Virtuosi	26	+2 laps	10	
DNF	14	(Germany) David Beckmann	Charouz Racing System	23	Collision	12	
DNF	16	(Israel) Roy Nissany	DAMS	22	Accident	8	
DNF	9	(Denmark) Christian Lundgaard	ART Grand Prix	16	Mechanical	21	
DNF	25	(Japan) Marino Sato	Trident	9	Mechanical	19	
DNF	17	(New Zealand) Marcus Armstrong	DAMS	2	Driveshaft	1^{2}	
DNF	20	(Brazil) Gianluca Petecof	Campos Racing	0	Collision	20	
DSQ	7	(New Zealand) Liam Lawson	Hitech Grand Prix	28	Disqualified^{3}	2	
Fastest lap： (Russia) Robert Shwartzman − Prema Racing − 1:30.728 (lap 28)

Notes

- ^2 – Marcus Armstrong was supposed to start Sprint Race 2 from P1, but failed to rejoin the starting grid due to a technical issue. Thus, he had to start the race from the pit lane.
- ^3 – Liam Lawson finished the race in first place but was disqualified for using the wrong throttle map at the start, a breach of Technical Regulations 3.6.5.

=== Feature race ===
Pos.	No.	Driver	Entrant	Laps	Time/Retired	Grid	Points
1	10	(France) Théo Pourchaire	ART Grand Prix	42	1:01:02.089	1	25 (4)
2	2	(Australia) Oscar Piastri	Prema Racing	42	+2.894	3	18
3	4	(Brazil) Felipe Drugovich	UNI-Virtuosi	42	+14.261	9	15
4	1	(Russia) Robert Shwartzman	Prema Racing	42	+17.910	2	12
5	3	(China) Guanyu Zhou	UNI-Virtuosi	42	+24.130	10	10 (2)
6	21	(Switzerland) Ralph Boschung	Campos Racing	42	+30.693	6	8
7	7	(New Zealand) Liam Lawson	Hitech Grand Prix	42	+31.288	12	6
8	8	(Estonia) Jüri Vips	Hitech Grand Prix	42	+37.051^{4}	5	4
9	16	(Israel) Roy Nissany	DAMS	42	+46.563	7	2
10	11	(Netherlands) Richard Verschoor	MP Motorsport	42	+49.513	16	1
11	24	(Netherlands) Bent Viscaal	Trident	42	+51.380	15	
12	9	(Denmark) Christian Lundgaard	ART Grand Prix	42	+52.966^{5}	8	
13	14	(Germany) David Beckmann	Charouz Racing System	42	+55.834	13	
14	25	(Japan) Marino Sato	Trident	42	+1:11.237	18	
15	15	(Brazil) Guilherme Samaia	Charouz Racing System	41	+1 lap	20	
16	20	(Brazil) Gianluca Petecof	Campos Racing	41	+1 lap^{4}	19	
17	23	(Italy) Alessio Deledda	HWA Racelab	41	+1 lap	22	
18	22	(United Kingdom) Jack Aitken	HWA Racelab	40	+2 laps	21	
DNF	5	(United Kingdom) Dan Ticktum	Carlin	32	Accident	4	
DNF	12	(Germany) Lirim Zendeli	MP Motorsport	30	Accident	17	
DNF	17	(New Zealand) Marcus Armstrong	DAMS	29	Collision	14	
DNF	6	(India) Jehan Daruvala	Carlin	17	Collision damage	11	
Fastest lap： (China) Guanyu Zhou − UNI-Virtuosi − 1:21.912 (lap 42)

Notes

- ^4 – Both Jüri Vips and Gianluca Petecof were given a five-second time penalty and a ten-second time penalty for causing a collision respectively.
- ^5 - Christian Lundgaard was given a five-second time penalty for speeding in the pit lane.

== Standings after the event ==
Drivers' Championship standings

	Pos.	Driver	Points
	1	(China) Guanyu Zhou	68
2	2	(Australia) Oscar Piastri	52
8	3	(France) Théo Pourchaire	47
1	4	(United Kingdom) Dan Ticktum	38
3	5	(New Zealand) Liam Lawson	36

Teams' Championship standings

	Pos.	Team	Points
1	1	(United Kingdom) UNI-Virtuosi Racing	97
1	2	(Italy) Prema Racing	82
2	3	(United Kingdom) Carlin	67
1	4	(France) ART Grand Prix	63
1	5	(United Kingdom) Hitech Grand Prix	58

- Note: Only the top five positions are included for both sets of standings.

== See also ==
- 2021 Monaco Grand Prix

Previous round: 2021 Sakhir Formula 2 round	FIA Formula 2 Championship; 2021 season	Next round: 2021 Baku Formula 2 round
Previous round: 2019 Monte Carlo Formula 2 round	Monte Carlo Formula 2 round	Next round: 2022 Monte Carlo Formula 2 round
