= 2019 Sochi Formula 3 round =

(Russia) 2019 Sochi Formula 3 round
Round details
- Round 8 of 8 in the 2019 FIA Formula 3 Championship.
- Layout of the Sochi Autodrom
- Location: Sochi Autodrom; Sochi, Russia
- Course: Permanent racing facility 5.848 km (3.634 mi)

Race 1
- Date: 28 September 2019
- Laps: 20
Pole position
Driver	(Russia) Robert Shwartzman	Prema Racing
Time	1:52.583	
Podium
First	(New Zealand) Marcus Armstrong	Prema Racing
Second	(Russia) Robert Shwartzman	Prema Racing
Third	(Finland) Niko Kari	Trident
Fastest lap
Driver	(United Kingdom) Jake Hughes	HWA Racelab
- Time: 1:55.513 (on lap 10)

Race 2
- Date: 29 September 2019
- Laps: 20
Podium
First	(Estonia) Jüri Vips	Hitech Grand Prix
Second	(New Zealand) Marcus Armstrong	Prema Racing
Third	(Russia) Robert Shwartzman	Prema Racing
Fastest lap
Driver	(New Zealand) Marcus Armstrong	Prema Racing
- Time: 1:55.860 (on lap 15)

The 2019 Sochi FIA Formula 3 round was a motor racing event held on 28 and 29 September 2019 at the Sochi Autodrom, Sochi, Russia. It was the eighth and final race of the 2019 FIA Formula 3 Championship, and ran in support of the 2019 Russian Grand Prix. The title was clinched by Robert Shwartzman in the first race.

== Classification ==
=== Qualifying ===
The Qualifying session took place on 27 September 2019, with Robert Shwartzman scoring pole position.

Pos.	No.	Driver	Team	Time/Gap	Grid
1	28	(Russia) Robert Shwartzman	Prema Racing	1:52.583	1
2	27	(India) Jehan Daruvala	Prema Racing	+0.192	2
3	26	(New Zealand) Marcus Armstrong	Prema Racing	+0.270	3
4	19	(Finland) Niko Kari	Trident	+0.608	4
5	3	(Denmark) Christian Lundgaard	ART Grand Prix	+0.691	5
6	11	(United Kingdom) Jake Hughes	HWA Racelab	+0.757	6
7	18	(Brazil) Pedro Piquet	Trident	+0.766	7
8	20	(Italy) Leonardo Pulcini	Hitech Grand Prix	+0.868	8
9	21	(Estonia) Jüri Vips	Hitech Grand Prix	+0.947	9
10	2	(United Kingdom) Max Fewtrell	ART Grand Prix	+0.956	10
11	30	(Brazil) Felipe Drugovich	Carlin Buzz Racing	+0.967	11
12	31	(United States) Logan Sargeant	Carlin Buzz Racing	+1.060	12
13	6	(Netherlands) Richard Verschoor	MP Motorsport	+1.241	13
14	10	(Netherlands) Bent Viscaal	HWA Racelab	+1.259	14
15	9	(United Kingdom) Raoul Hyman	Sauber Junior Team by Charouz	+1.294	15
16	17	(Canada) Devlin DeFrancesco	Trident	+1.299	16
17	14	(Japan) Yuki Tsunoda	Jenzer Motorsport	+1.355	17
18	22	(China) Ye Yifei	Hitech Grand Prix	+1.360	18
19	29	(Japan) Teppei Natori	Carlin Buzz Racing	+1.418	19
20	25	(Spain) Sebastián Fernández	Campos Racing	+1.463	20
21	7	(Germany) Lirim Zendeli	Sauber Junior Team by Charouz	+1.529	21
22	8	(Switzerland) Fabio Scherer	Sauber Junior Team by Charouz	+1.562	22
23	4	(New Zealand) Liam Lawson	MP Motorsport	+1.974	23
24	5	(Finland) Simo Laaksonen	MP Motorsport	+2.174	24
25	23	(Germany) David Schumacher	Campos Racing	+2.306	25
26	16	(Germany) Andreas Estner	Jenzer Motorsport	+2.329	26
27	12	(Iran) Keyvan Andres	HWA Racelab	+2.485	27
28	24	(Italy) Alessio Deledda	Campos Racing	+3.668	28
29	15	(Macau) Hon Chio Leong	Jenzer Motorsport	+4.583	29

=== Race 1 ===
Pos.	No.	Driver	Team	Laps	Time/Retired	Grid	Pts.
1	26	(New Zealand) Marcus Armstrong	Prema Racing	20	42:35.319	3	25
2	28	(Russia) Robert Shwartzman	Prema Racing	20	+1.077	1	18 (4)
3	19	(Finland) Niko Kari	Trident	20	+4.911	4	15
4	20	(Italy) Leonardo Pulcini	Hitech Grand Prix	20	+6.007	8	12
5	27	(India) Jehan Daruvala	Prema Racing	20	+8.349	2	10
6	18	(Brazil) Pedro Piquet	Trident	20	+9.479	7	8
7	11	(United Kingdom) Jake Hughes	HWA Racelab	20	+11.422	6	6 (2)
8	21	(Estonia) Jüri Vips	Hitech Grand Prix	20	+14.020	9	4
9	9	(United Kingdom) Raoul Hyman	Sauber Junior Team by Charouz	20	+15.501	15	2
10	6	(Netherlands) Richard Verschoor	MP Motorsport	20	+21.576	13	1
11	2	(United Kingdom) Max Fewtrell	ART Grand Prix	20	+22.461	10	
12	14	(Japan) Yuki Tsunoda	Jenzer Motorsport	20	+25.807	17	
13	22	(China) Ye Yifei	Hitech Grand Prix	20	+26.051	18	
14	3	(Denmark) Christian Lundgaard	ART Grand Prix	20	+27.950	5	
15	31	(United States) Logan Sargeant	Carlin Buzz Racing	20	+30.158	12	
16	25	(Spain) Sebastián Fernández	Campos Racing	20	+31.083	20	
17	5	(Finland) Simo Laaksonen	MP Motorsport	20	+35.981	24	
18	4	(New Zealand) Liam Lawson	MP Motorsport	20	+37.545	23	
19	12	(Iran) Keyvan Andres	HWA Racelab	20	+39.851	27	
20	29	(Japan) Teppei Natori	Carlin Buzz Racing	20	+42.861	19	
21	24	(Italy) Alessio Deledda	Campos Racing	20	+43.912	28	
22	23	(Germany) David Schumacher	Campos Racing	20	+59.897	25	
23	17	(Canada) Devlin DeFrancesco	Trident	20	+1:03.815	16	
24	16	(Germany) Andreas Estner	Jenzer Motorsport	20	+1:11.999	26	
25	30	(Brazil) Felipe Drugovich	Carlin Buzz Racing	20	+1:12.808	11	
DNF	10	(Netherlands) Bent Viscaal	HWA Racelab	9	Crash	14	
DNF	8	(Switzerland) Fabio Scherer	Sauber Junior Team by Charouz	3	Crash	22	
DNF	15	(Macau) Hon Chio Leong	Jenzer Motorsport	1	Crash	29	
WD	7	(Germany) Lirim Zendeli	Sauber Junior Team by Charouz	0	Withdrew		
Fastest lap: Jake Hughes (HWA Racelab) 1:55.513 (on lap 10)

=== Race 2 ===
Pos.	No.	Driver	Team	Laps	Time/Retired	Grid	Pts.
1	21	(Estonia) Jüri Vips	Hitech Grand Prix	20	38:55.595	1	15
2	26	(New Zealand) Marcus Armstrong	Prema Racing	20	+2.159	8	12 (2)
3	28	(Russia) Robert Shwartzman	Prema Racing	20	+9.596	7	10
4	11	(United Kingdom) Jake Hughes	HWA Racelab	20	+10.290	2	8
5	19	(Finland) Niko Kari	Trident	20	+15.259	6	6
6	22	(China) Ye Yifei	Hitech Grand Prix	20	+24.090	13	4
7	6	(Netherlands) Richard Verschoor	MP Motorsport	20	+24.901	10	2
8	4	(New Zealand) Liam Lawson	MP Motorsport	20	+28.414	18	1
9	3	(Denmark) Christian Lundgaard	ART Grand Prix	20	+32.766	14	
10	31	(United States) Logan Sargeant	Carlin Buzz Racing	20	+33.237	15	
11	2	(United Kingdom) Max Fewtrell	ART Grand Prix	20	+34.111	11	
12	17	(Canada) Devlin DeFrancesco	Trident	20	+34.475	23	
13	9	(United Kingdom) Raoul Hyman	Sauber Junior Team by Charouz	20	+34.829	9	
14	27	(India) Jehan Daruvala	Prema Racing	20	+37.091	4	
15	30	(Brazil) Felipe Drugovich	Carlin Buzz Racing	20	+38.358	25	
16	20	(Italy) Leonardo Pulcini	Hitech Grand Prix	20	+40.358	5	
17	10	(Netherlands) Bent Viscaal	HWA Racelab	20	+40.604	26	
18	16	(Germany) Andreas Estner	Jenzer Motorsport	20	+46.161	24	
19	29	(Japan) Teppei Natori	Carlin Buzz Racing	20	+47.022	20	
20	23	(Germany) David Schumacher	Campos Racing	20	+54.463	22	
21	15	(Macau) Hon Chio Leong	Jenzer Motorsport	20	+1:05.369	28	
22	24	(Italy) Alessio Deledda	Campos Racing	20	+1:28.601	21	
23	12	(Iran) Keyvan Andres	HWA Racelab	20	+2:09.450	19	
24	25	(Spain) Sebastián Fernández	Campos Racing	19	+1 lap	16	
25	14	(Japan) Yuki Tsunoda	Jenzer Motorsport	19	+1 lap	12	
DNF	18	(Brazil) Pedro Piquet	Trident	16		3	
DNF	5	(Finland) Simo Laaksonen	MP Motorsport	8		17	
DNF	8	(Switzerland) Fabio Scherer	Sauber Junior Team by Charouz	8		27	
WD	7	(Germany) Lirim Zendeli	Sauber Junior Team by Charouz	0	Withdrew		
Fastest lap: Marcus Armstrong (Prema Racing) 1:55.860 (on lap 15)

== See also ==
- 2019 Russian Grand Prix
- 2019 Sochi Formula 2 round

Previous round: 2019 Monza Formula 3 round	FIA Formula 3 Championship; 2019 season	Next round: 2020 Spielberg Formula 3 round
Previous round: 2018 Sochi GP3 Series round	Sochi Formula 3 round	Next round: 2021 Sochi Formula 3 round
