= Jüri Vips =

Estonian racing driver (born 2000)

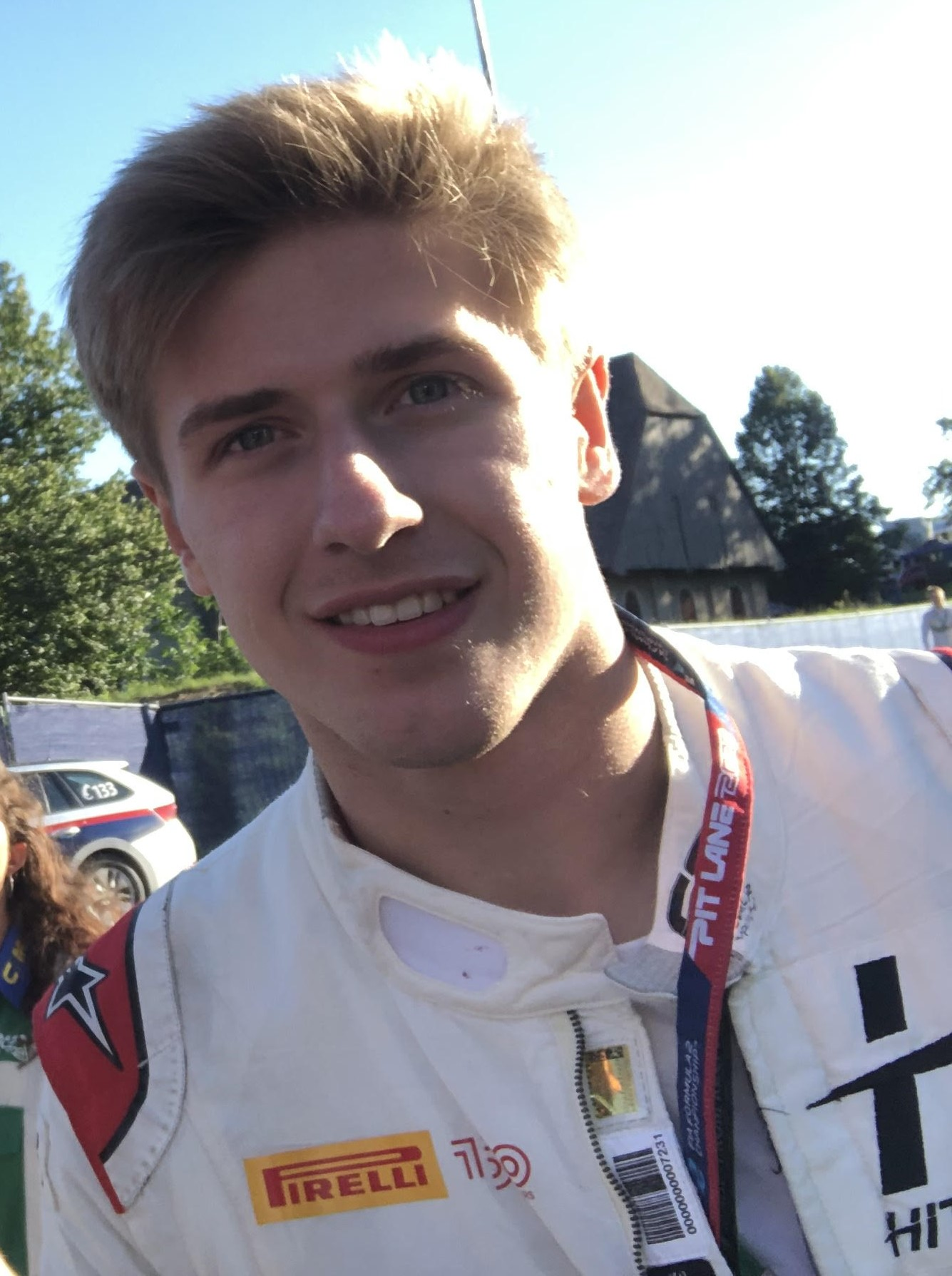
- Vips in 2022
- Nationality: (Estonia) Estonian
- Born: 10 August 2000 (age 26) Tallinn, Estonia
- Categorisation: FIA Gold

IndyCar Series career
- 3 races run over 2 years
- Team: No. 75 (Rahal Letterman Lanigan Racing)
- Best finish: 33rd (2023)
- First race: 2023 Grand Prix of Portland (Portland)
- Last race: 2024 Grand Prix of Portland (Portland)
Wins	Podiums	Poles
0	0	0

Previous series
- 2023 2020–22 2020 2019: IndyCar; FIA Formula 2 Championship; FR European Championship; Super Formula Championship

Championship titles
- 2017: ADAC Formula 4

Jüri Vips (Estonian pronunciation: [ˈjy.ri vips]; born 10 August 2000) is an Estonian racing driver who last competed in the IMSA SportsCar Championship for RLL Team McLaren. He has previously driven in the IndyCar Series with Rahal Letterman Lanigan Racing, and won races in both the FIA Formula 2 and FIA Formula 3 Championships. He was the 2017 ADAC Formula 4 champion, and was formerly a member of the Red Bull Junior Team.

== Career ==
=== Karting ===
Vips was born in Tallinn and began competitive karting in 2011 in his native Estonia. After winning the Rotax Junior Estonian Championship in 2013, Vips qualified for the 2014 Rotax Max Challenge Grand Finals in the Junior category, in which he claimed victory. He competed in the CIK-FIA European KF1 Championship in 2015, racing against future FIA Formula 3 competitors Richard Verschoor and Marcus Armstrong. Vips ended the championship in twelfth place.

=== Formula 4 ===
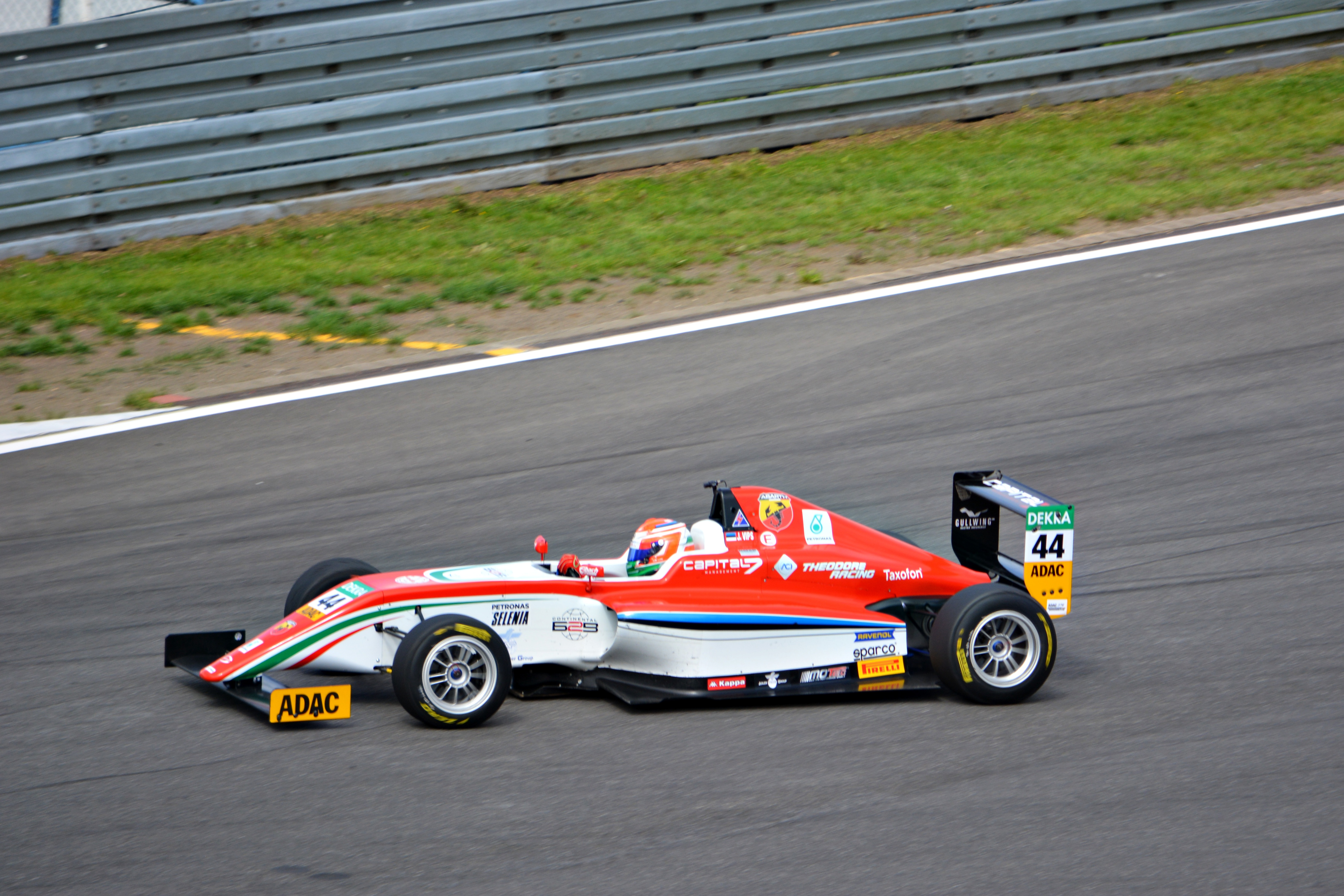
Vips competing in the ADAC Formula 4 Championship at the Nürburgring in 2017.

In 2016, Vips made his car-racing debut in the Italian F4 and ADAC Formula 4 championships with Prema Powerteam. He finished sixth in ADAC Formula 4 and fifth in Italian F4, where he won the final race of the season and took the title of rookie champion. In the winter of 2016–17, Vips took part in the Indian-based MRF Challenge Formula 2000 Championship, taking three podium places and finishing sixth in the standings.

In 2017, Vips continued with Prema in Italian F4 and ADAC Formula 4. His appearances in Italian F4 were as a guest driver and he was ineligible to place in the championship, however he took two pole positions and a race victory at Mugello. In ADAC Formula 4, Vips was involved in a title fight with teammate Marcus Armstrong. Vips claimed the title in the final race at the Hockenheimring after pole-sitter Armstrong lost the lead of the race to Artem Petrov.

=== Formula 3 ===
In September 2017, after his ADAC Formula 4 victory, Vips tested Formula 3 machinery with Prema at Magny-Cours. In October he made his debut in the FIA Formula 3 European Championship as a guest driver, replacing absent Motopark driver Petru Florescu.

Vips secured a full-time seat with Motopark for the 2018 FIA Formula 3 European Championship. He took three pole positions and four race wins on his way to fourth place in the championship, behind teammate Dan Ticktum and Prema drivers Mick Schumacher and Robert Shwartzman. In November 2018, Vips made his first appearance at the Macau Grand Prix. He placed fourteenth in qualifying and improved to seventh in the qualification race. He maintained his position in the main race, finishing seventh, but was handed a forty-second time penalty for making an overtake under red-flag conditions, demoting him to nineteenth place.

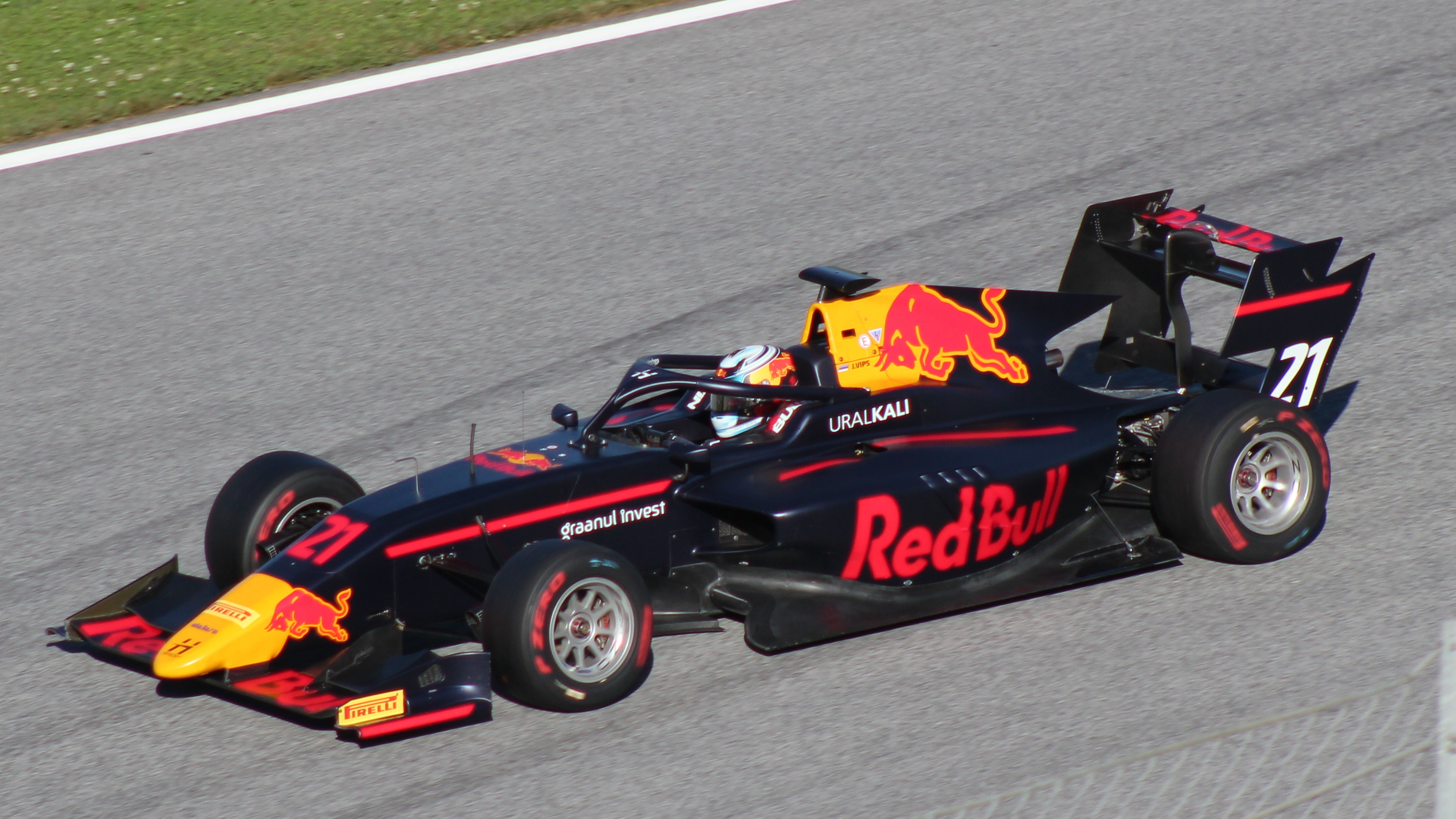
Vips driving the Dallara F3 2019 at the 2019 Spielberg Formula 3 round.

In December 2018, it was announced that Vips would compete in the new FIA Formula 3 Championship, joining Hitech Grand Prix for the 2019 season. He took victory in the feature races at the Red Bull Ring and at Silverstone, the latter from pole position, and won the sprint race at the Sochi. He ended the season fourth in the drivers' championship, behind the three Prema entries of Robert Shwartzman, Marcus Armstrong and Jehan Daruvala.

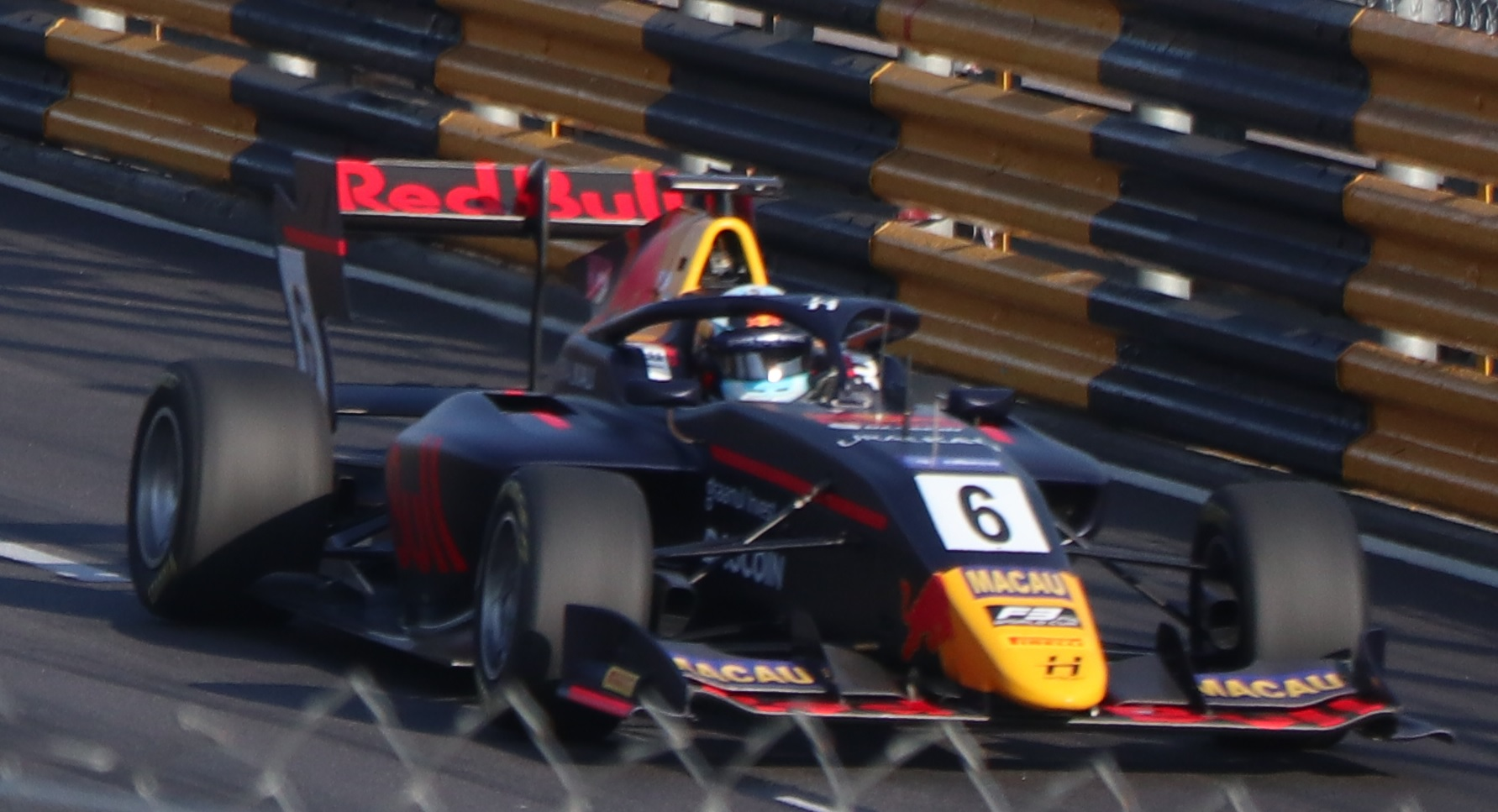
Vips at the 2019 Macau Grand Prix

Vips continued with Hitech to contest the 2019 Macau Grand Prix. He set the fastest qualifying time – a new lap record – and converted pole position for the qualifying race into victory, putting him on pole for the main race. Vips led in the early part of the race, but crashes from Leonardo Pulcini and Ferdinand Habsburg nullified his lead as the safety car was deployed. He was overtaken by Richard Verschoor when the race resumed and finished in second place, 0.792 seconds behind Verschoor.

=== 2020: Disrupted campaigns ===
In October 2019, it was announced that Vips would replace Patricio O'Ward at Team Mugen for the final round of the 2019 Super Formula Championship. He qualified nineteenth and ran as high as fifth in the race. However, he stalled the car during his pit stop, losing around half a minute while sat stationary and causing him to drop to eighteenth by the finish. Vips re-joined Team Mugen in a December 2019 test at Suzuka. In January 2020, it was announced that Vips would drive for the team in the 2020 Super Formula Championship alongside Tomoki Nojiri. However, the start of the Super Formula season was postponed until August due to the COVID-19 pandemic, and the closure of Japan's borders to foreign nationals put Vips' ability to compete into doubt.

In June 2020, Vips took part in a Formula Regional European Championship (FREC) test at Imola with the Finnish KIC Motorsport team. He was then announced as part of the team's lineup for the 2020 season. Vips' manager Marko Asmer clarified that his Super Formula campaign was the priority, but that FREC would be a "back-up" if travel to Japan became impossible. Vips' first FREC race at Misano ended in retirement after a spin into the gravel.

Vips was ultimately unable to enter Japan in time for the first round of the Super Formula championship at Motegi. He was replaced at Team Mugen by Ukyo Sasahara. Shortly after claiming a double podium finish in the FREC round at Circuit Paul Ricard, Vips was called up to the FIA Formula 2 Championship to replace injured DAMS driver Sean Gelael. Vips finished narrowly outside the points in his first four races at Spa-Francorchamps and Monza. He scored first points of the season at Mugello where he finished seventh in the feature race and third in the sprint race. Formula 2 commitments forced Vips to miss the FREC round at the Red Bull Ring, but he returned to FREC at the following round at Mugello, claiming a second-place finish.

After missing the first three rounds, Vips was set to return to Super Formula for the fourth round at Autopolis, having successfully entered Japan and completed a two-week quarantine period. This caused him to miss the fifth and sixth rounds of FREC, limiting his chances of earning FIA Super Licence points through that series. However, on the week before the race at Autopolis, Team Mugen confirmed that Vips would not take part in any of the remaining rounds. Formula One team Red Bull Racing later revealed that Vips had been recalled from Super Formula to complete testing and reserve driver duties.

=== FIA Formula 2 Championship ===
==== 2021 ====
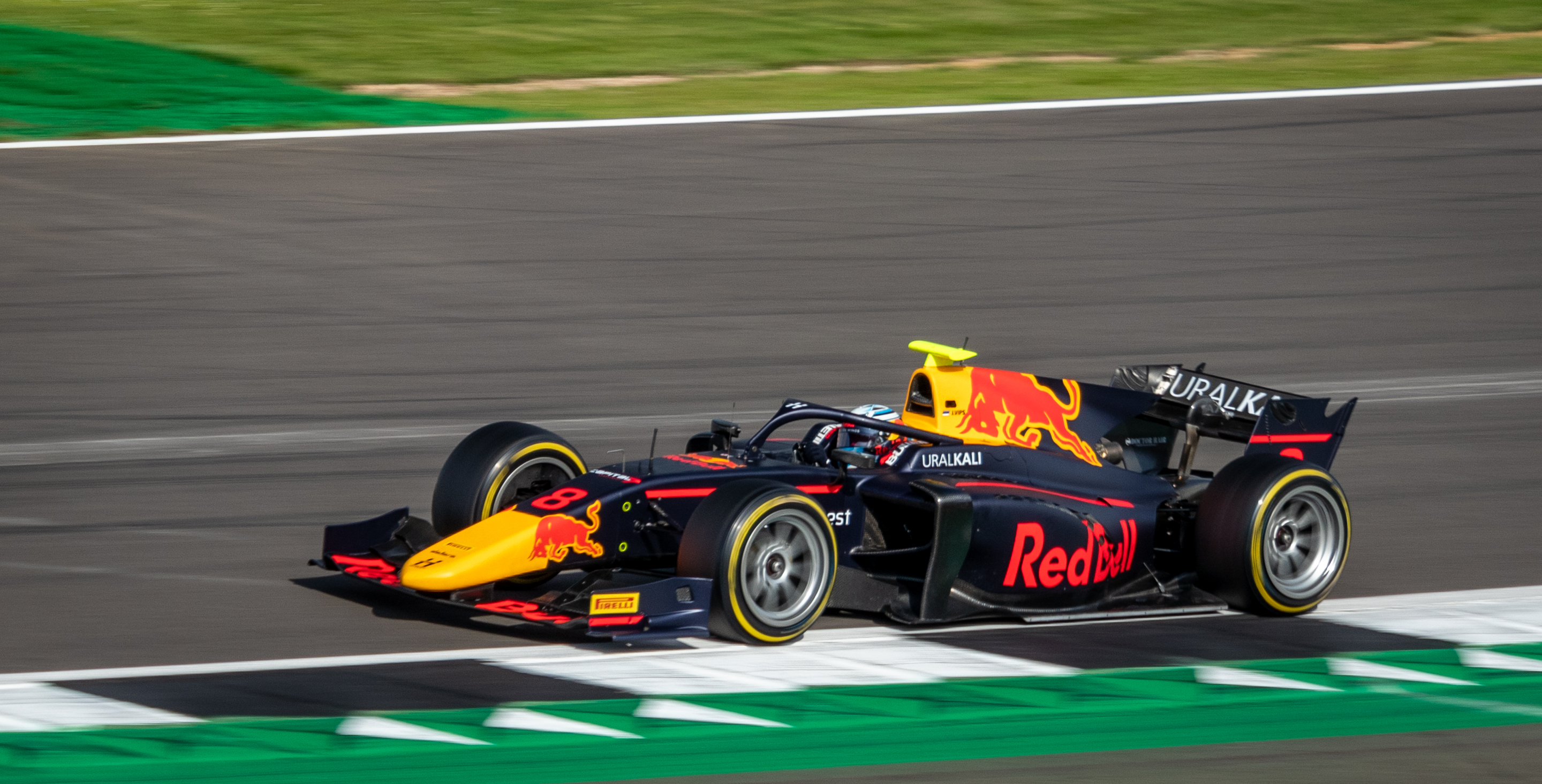
Vips driving the Dallara F2 2018 during the 2021 Silverstone Formula 2 round.

In January 2021, it was announced that Vips would make his full-time Formula 2 debut, contesting the 2021 season with Hitech Grand Prix alongside Liam Lawson. At the first round at the Bahrain International Circuit, Vips qualified fifth. However, he was excluded from qualifying due to a technical infringement. Vips charged from the back all the way to tenth. Progressing to tenth place in the opening race earnt him reverse-grid pole position for the second race. He survived an attack from Lirim Zendeli at the race start. He finally succumbed to the lead on lap five after Zhou Guanyu passed him. On lap fifteen, the safety car was brought out and Vips made the choice to pit for fresher tyres. But with less than three laps to go, whilst running in second place, Vips suffered a gearbox issue that fell him to sixteenth at the flag. The feature race saw little for Vips, ending the race in thirteenth. He ended the round without scoring points, describing his luck as "laughable". In Monaco, Vips finished fifth in the first sprint, holding off Dan Ticktum in the closing stages. The second sprint saw Vips finish the race in fourth place after going past Theo Pourchaire on lap 24 of 30. However, when Lawson was disqualified, Vips was promoted to third, hence scoring his first podium for Hitech.

At the third round at the Baku City Circuit, Vips qualified a season best second, locking up a Hitech front row alongside Lawson on pole. He finished seventh in the sprint race 1, having missed seventh place to Marcus Armstrong by less than a tenth. Vips claimed his maiden win the next race, passing Bent Viscaal and David Beckmann en route to victory in Formula 2's one-hundredth race. He described his victory as "redemption" and "relief" after his misfortune in Bahrain. Vips won once again, holding off Oscar Piastri by a second during the feature race. In doing so, Vips became the first driver to win two Formula 2 races in a weekend. This raised him into fourth in the championship. Vips started second in the first sprint at Silverstone Circuit and jumped Christian Lundgaard at the start. Ultimately they were both jumped by Prema's Robert Shwartzman who took the lead. Vips was unable to pass Shwartzman and settled for second place. The next two races yielded sixth and seventh for Vips.

Vips qualified ninth in Monza, hence would start second for sprint race 1. He took the lead from Beckmann into the first corner. He would keep the lead until lap fifteen, when Pourchaire passed him. Things went downhill for Vips from then on in the race, as he would struggle and fall to eighth. Vips retired on lap seven in the feature race following a mechanical issue with his car. In Sochi Autodrom, Vips obtained second place in the first sprint in mixed conditions, unable to pressure race winner Dan Ticktum throughout the race. Vips did not finish the feature race, due to a mechanical failure once again. He voiced out that he was "very frustrated" and considered reliability to be "a bit of a joke".

Vips took third place in the inaugural race at Jeddah Street Circuit. Having starting at the same position in the first sprint, he lost the position to Ralph Boschung before reclaiming the position on lap ten. He did not finish the second sprint after making contact with Drugovich and ripping off his front wing in the process. Vips would go on to finish 6th in the red-flagged feature race. The season finale at Abu Dhabi yielded little for Vips, as he qualified poorly in fifteenth. He was unable to progress in the sprint races, finishing twelfth in the first one. He retired in the second sprint following contact with newly champion Piastri. He managed to recover in the feature race, finishing eighth after passing a few drivers in the later stages on fresher tyres. Vips finished the 2021 season in sixth place with 120 points, three places higher than teammate Lawson. During the season, Vips netted a total of two wins, six podiums and a fastest lap.

==== 2022 ====
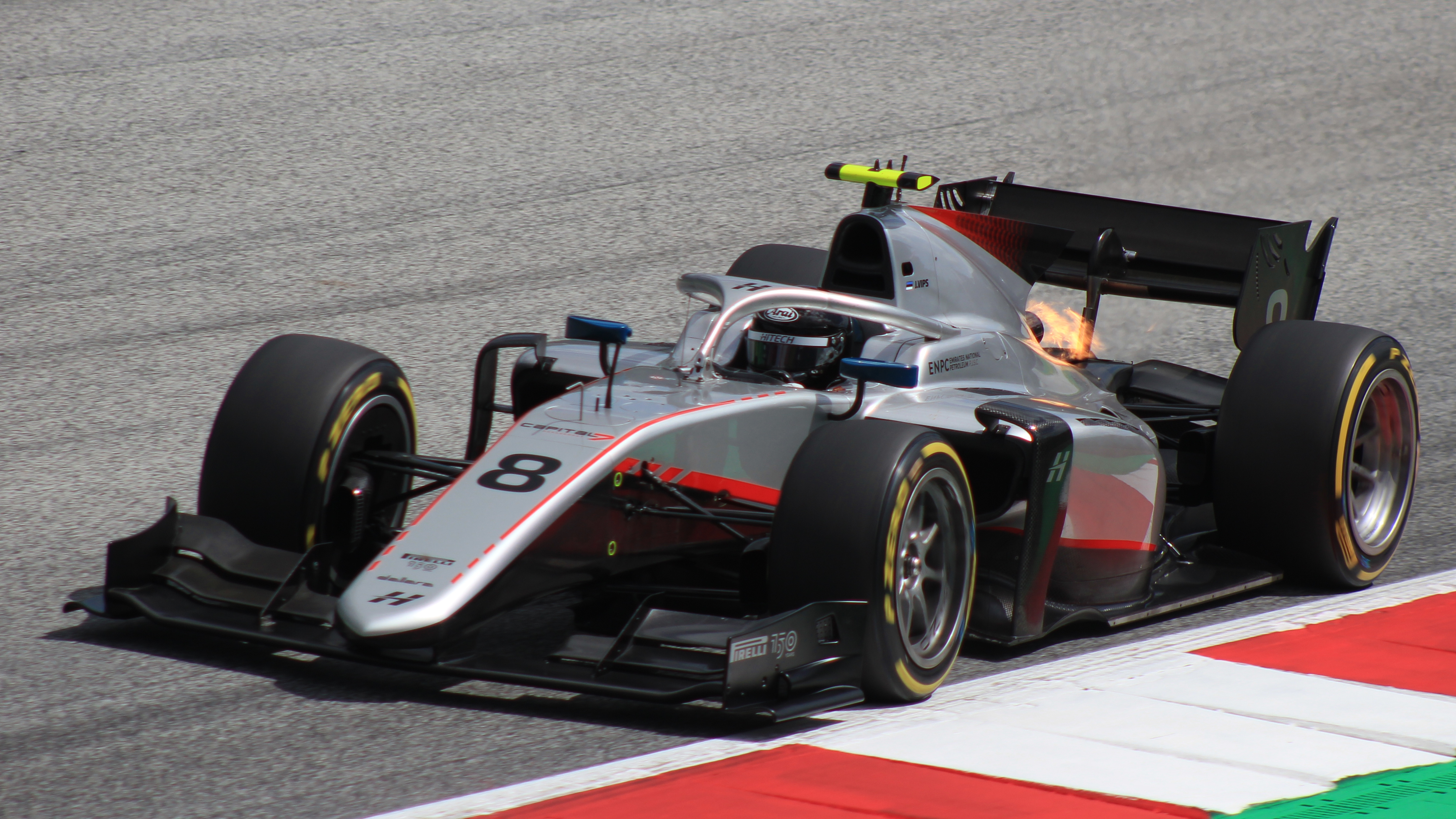
Vips driving for Hitech Grand Prix during the 2022 Spielberg Formula 2 round.

Vips continued in the series with Hitech for 2022, alongside former Formula 4 teammate Marcus Armstrong. He began the season with third in qualifying in Bahrain, where he was able to extract from the opportunity by taking the lead on the opening lap of the feature race. However, a slow stop dropped him down the order, but was able to recover back to third place. Vips qualified eighth in Jeddah, but received a grid penalty for the sprint race for impeding. Despite this, he managed to take consecutive podiums, having outdragged Jake Hughes for second by less than a tenth. He only salvaged a tenth place finish in the feature race after another slow pit stop. Vips secured his first F2 pole in Imola. However, he experienced a nightmare start on Sunday, he endured a slow start before spinning out of the race on lap 6. He claimed a front row start in Barcelona, but once again spun and beached his car in the gravel in the sprint race. He was plagued by another slow pit stop in as many rounds during the feature race, and finished in 17th place.

Aiming to flip his fortunes, Vips qualified fourth in Monaco, and returned to the podium in the feature race having jumped Jack Doohan in the pit stops. He took his second pole of the season in Baku. With a handful laps to go, Vips crashed out of the feature race from the lead at the Castle section, having led the majority of the race. Even though Vips used a racial slur on a livestream leading to his exit from Red Bull, he continued to race in the championship with team boss Oliver Oakes stating that he had given him another chance "to redeem himself" following the incident. After securing a sixth place finish in the Silverstone, he qualified on the front row in Austria. Having finished fifth in the sprint, he shot into the lead early in the feature race, but was forced to make an extra pit stop having started on wet tyres on a drying track; he finished eighth. He failed to score in Paul Ricard after a penalty and a slow pit stop compounded his sprint and feature race respectively. In Budapest, Vips made up three places at the start of the sprint race to move into second, a position he held until the chequered flag, securing another rostrum. He finished the feature race in fifth following a successful alternative strategy.

Starting at the back in Spa-Francorchamps, Vips made up fourteen places in the feature race to secure points in eighth place. After finishing fifth and seventh in the Zandvoort races, Vips earned his big break in Monza by taking his first win of the season during the sprint race after passing Frederik Vesti for the lead. The feature race provided contrasting fortunes, as Vips received a ten-second stop/go penalty for colliding into Liam Lawson, but was able to rescue a point from the race. Following the weekend, he admitted that it was "quite difficult" to find an F2 seat for 2023. After finishing eighth in the Abu Dhabi finale, Vips placed 11th in the standings with 114 points.

== Formula One ==
In October 2018, Vips was linked to a place in the Red Bull Junior Team. He was confirmed with the program the following month prior to the Macau Grand Prix.

In November 2020, Vips received his FIA Super Licence after completing a 300 km test with Red Bull Racing, driving the Red Bull RB8 at Silverstone Circuit. He served as a reserve driver for Red Bull and sister team AlphaTauri at the Turkish, Bahrain, Sakhir and Abu Dhabi Grands Prix. He took part in the end-of-season Abu Dhabi young driver test with Red Bull, driving the RB16. He again took part in the Abu Dhabi young driver test at the end of the 2021 season, driving the RB16B. Vips was one of the reserve drivers for Red Bull in 2022. He made his Formula One free practice debut with Red Bull at the 2022 Spanish Grand Prix, taking Sergio Pérez's place.

In June 2022, Vips was suspended by Red Bull pending an investigation after he was heard using the word "nigga" while playing Call of Duty: Modern Warfare on his teammate Liam Lawson's Twitch livestream. His contract with Red Bull Racing and the Red Bull Junior Team was terminated on 28 June following the completion of the investigation. He was replaced as reserve driver by Lawson.

On 6 July, Christian Horner, Red Bull's team principal, made some statements that implied that they would continue to support Vips "from a mental health and educational perspective" since "everybody at some point deserves a second chance" and that he would continue in the Red Bull Junior Team, even if his contract as a reserve and test driver was terminated. However, on 19 July, Helmut Marko confirmed that Vips was no longer receiving support of any kind from Red Bull.

== IndyCar Series ==
In October 2022, Vips took part in a private IndyCar driver evaluation test at Sebring with Rahal Letterman Lanigan Racing. He was second fastest out of the five participants, three tenths off Tom Blomqvist. On 13 March 2023, Vips participated in a second IndyCar test with Rahal Letterman Lanigan Racing at Barber, replacing Jack Harvey who was deemed unfit following an injury at the Grand Prix of St. Petersburg.

=== 2023 season ===
At the end of August 2023, Rahal Letterman Lanigan Racing announced that Vips would make his IndyCar debut, partaking in the final two races of the 2023 season, replacing the departed Jack Harvey. He finished his first race Grand Prix of Portland in eighteenth place and winning the rookies race. Vips ended the season with eighteen points and in 33rd place. Vips ultimately was not selected to replace Harvey going forward with RLL, with the seat instead going to Pietro Fittipaldi.

=== 2024 season ===
On 7 August 2024, it was announced that Vips would return to drive for RLL at Portland, this time driving the No. 75 entry.

== Endurance racing career ==
=== 2026 ===
At the start of 2026, Vips was confirmed to make his debut in the GTD Pro class with RLL Team McLaren at the 2026 24 Hours of Daytona.

== Personal life ==
Vips is noted for his ability to perform complex mental calculations from a young age, having appeared on an Estonian talent show to demonstrate this ability.

== Karting record ==
=== Karting career summary ===
Season	Series	Team	Position
2011	Estonian Championship — Raket		1st
2012	Estonian Championship — Rotax Junior		3rd
2013	Rotax Max Wintercup — Junior		13th
2013	Estonian Championship — Rotax Junior		1st
2013	Rotax Euro Challenge — Junior		28th
2013	Rotax Max Challenge Grand Finals — Junior	Tark Racing	15th
2014	Trofeo delle Industrie — KFJ		8th
2014	Rotax Max Wintercup — Junior	Strawberry Racing	1st
2014	Super 1 National Championship — Rotax Max Junior		34th
2014	Rotax Euro Challenge — Junior		32nd
2014	CIK-FIA European Championship — KFJ	Energy Corse	NC†
2014	CIK-FIA World Championship — KFJ	Zanardi Strakka Racing	9th
2014	WSK Final Cup — KFJ	Zanardi Strakka Racing	19th
2014	Rotax Max Challenge Grand Finals — Junior	Talvar Racing	1st
2015	South Garda Winter Cup — KF	Ricky Flynn Motorsport	NC
2015	WSK Champions Cup — KF	Ricky Flynn Motorsport	14th
2015	WSK Gold Cup — KF	Ricky Flynn Motorsport	12th
2015	WSK Super Master Series — KF	Ricky Flynn Motorsport	12th
2015	CIK-FIA European Championship — KF	Ricky Flynn Motorsport	12th
2015	CIK-FIA World Championship — KF	Ricky Flynn Motorsport	NC

== Racing record ==
=== Racing career summary ===
Season	Series	Team	Races	Wins	Poles	F/Laps	Podiums	Points	Position
2016	ADAC Formula 4 Championship	Prema Powerteam	24	0	0	0	5	138	6th
2016	Italian F4 Championship	Prema Powerteam	18	1	2	3	8	140	5th
2016–17	MRF Challenge Formula 2000	MRF Racing	15	0	0	0	3	135	6th
2017	ADAC Formula 4 Championship	Prema Powerteam	21	2	0	0	7	245.5	**1st**
2017	Italian F4 Championship	Prema Powerteam	9	1	2	2	5	114	NC†
2017	FIA Formula 3 European Championship	Motopark	3	0	0	0	0	0	NC‡
2018	FIA Formula 3 European Championship	Motopark	30	4	3	6	8	284	4th
2018	Macau Grand Prix	Motopark	1	0	0	0	0	N/A	19th
2019	FIA Formula 3 Championship	Hitech Grand Prix	16	3	1	1	4	141	4th
2019	Macau Grand Prix	Hitech Grand Prix	1	0	1	0	1	N/A	**2nd**
2019	Super Formula	Team Mugen	1	0	0	0	0	0	23rd
2020	Formula Regional European Championship	KIC Motorsport	9	0	0	3	3	81	8th
2020	FIA Formula 2 Championship	DAMS	8	0	0	0	1	16	16th
2020	Formula One	Aston Martin Red Bull Racing	Test/Reserve driver						
2020	Formula One	Scuderia AlphaTauri Honda	Test/Reserve driver						
2021	FIA Formula 2 Championship	Hitech Grand Prix	23	2	0	1	6	120	6th
2021	Formula One	Red Bull Racing Honda	Test driver						
2022	FIA Formula 2 Championship	Hitech Grand Prix	28	1	2	4	5	114	11th
2022	Formula One	Oracle Red Bull Racing	Test/Reserve driver						
2022	Formula One	Scuderia AlphaTauri	Test/Reserve driver						
2023	IndyCar Series	Rahal Letterman Lanigan Racing	2	0	0	0	0	18	33rd
2024	IndyCar Series	Rahal Letterman Lanigan Racing	1	0	0	0	0	11	39th
2026	IMSA SportsCar Championship - GTD	RLL Team McLaren	1	0	0	1	0	222	42nd

^{†} As Vips had not competed in the required number of rounds, he was ineligible for a championship position.
^{‡} As Vips was a guest driver, he was ineligible for points.

=== Complete ADAC Formula 4 Championship results ===
(key) (Races in bold indicate pole position) (Races in italics indicate fastest lap)

Year	Team	1	2	3	4	5	6	7	8	9	10	11	12	13	14	15	16	17	18	19	20	21	22	23	24	Pos	Points
2016	Prema Powerteam	OSC1; 1; 9	OSC1; 2 Ret	OSC1; 3; 25	SAC; 1 Ret	SAC; 2; 8	SAC; 3 Ret	LAU; 1; 7	LAU; 2; 11	LAU; 3; 22	OSC2; 1; 26	OSC2; 2; 21	OSC2; 3 Ret	RBR; 1; 2	RBR; 2; 4	RBR; 3; 6	NÜR; 1; 5	NÜR; 2; 2	NÜR; 3; 3	ZAN; 1; 5	ZAN; 2; 8	ZAN; 3; 9	HOC; 1; 3	HOC; 2; 16	HOC; 3; 3	6th	138
2017	Prema Powerteam	OSC1; 1; 1	OSC1; 2; 4	OSC1; 3; 5	LAU; 1; 2	LAU; 2; 3	LAU; 3 Ret	RBR; 1; 4	RBR; 2; 5	RBR; 3; 1	OSC2; 1; 6	OSC2; 2; 6	OSC2; 3; 3	NÜR; 1; 5	NÜR; 2; 3	NÜR; 3; 4	SAC; 1; 5	SAC; 2; 7	SAC; 3; 4	HOC; 1; 8	HOC; 2; 6	HOC; 3; 3				1st	245.5

=== Complete Italian F4 Championship results ===
(key) (Races in bold indicate pole position) (Races in italics indicate fastest lap)

Year	Team	1	2	3	4	5	6	7	8	9	10	11	12	13	14	15	16	17	18	19	20	21	22	23	Pos	Points
2016	Prema Powerteam	MIS; 1; 7	MIS; 2	MIS; 3; 5	MIS; 4; 2	ADR; 1	ADR; 2	ADR; 3	ADR; 4	IMO1; 1 Ret	IMO1; 2; 16	IMO1; 3; 11	MUG; 1; 9	MUG; 2; 3	MUG; 3; 3	**VLL**; **1**; 4	**VLL**; **2**; 2	VLL; 3; 14	IMO2; 1; 2	IMO2; 2; 19	IMO2; 3; 9	MNZ; 1 Ret	MNZ; 2; 3	MNZ; 3; 1	5th	140
2017	Prema Powerteam	MIS; 1; 3	MIS; 2; 4	MIS; 3 Ret	ADR; 1	ADR; 2	ADR; 3	VLL; 1	VLL; 2	VLL; 3	MUG1; 1; 2	**MUG1**; **2**; 1	**MUG1**; **3**; 2	IMO; 1 Ret	IMO; 2; 2	IMO; 3; 6	MUG2; 1	MUG2; 2	MUG2; 3	MNZ; 1	MNZ; 2	MNZ; 3			NC†	114

^{†} Vips did not compete in the required number of rounds to be eligible for a championship position.

=== Complete MRF Challenge Formula 2000 Championship results ===
(key) (Races in bold indicate pole position; races in italics indicate fastest lap)

Year	Team	1	2	3	4	5	6	7	8	9	10	11	12	13	14	15	16	DC	Points
2016–17	MRF Racing	BHR; 1; 4	BHR; 2 Ret	BHR; 3; 5	BHR; 4; 2	DUB; 1; 6	DUB; 2; 3	DUB; 3 Ret	DUB; 4; 4	GNO; 1 Ret	GNO; 2 DNS	GNO; 3; 6	GNO; 4 Ret	CHE; 1; 4	CHE; 2; 5	CHE; 3; 2	CHE; 4; 4	6th	135

=== Complete FIA Formula 3 European Championship results ===
(key) (Races in bold indicate pole position) (Races in italics indicate fastest lap)

Year	Entrant	Engine	1	2	3	4	5	6	7	8	9	10	11	12	13	14	15	16	17	18	19	20	21	22	23	24	25	26	27	28	29	30	DC	Points
2017	Motopark	Volkswagen	SIL; 1	SIL; 2	SIL; 3	MNZ; 1	MNZ; 2	MNZ; 3	PAU; 1	PAU; 2	PAU; 3	HUN; 1	HUN; 2	HUN; 3	NOR; 1	NOR; 2	NOR; 3	SPA; 1	SPA; 2	SPA; 3	ZAN; 1	ZAN; 2	ZAN; 3	NÜR; 1	NÜR; 2	NÜR; 3	RBR; 1	RBR; 2	RBR; 3	HOC; 1; 21	HOC; 2; 12	HOC; 3; 12	NC†	0
2018	Motopark	Volkswagen	PAU; 1; 10	PAU; 2; 17	PAU; 3; 12	HUN; 1; 6	HUN; 2; 18	HUN; 3; 4	NOR; 1; 7	NOR; 2; 1	NOR; 3; 2	ZAN; 1; 6	ZAN; 2; 8	ZAN; 3; 15	SPA; 1; 6	SPA; 2 Ret	SPA; 3; 4	SIL; 1; 4	SIL; 2; 2	**SIL**; **3**; 1	MIS; 1; 5	**MIS**; **2**; 1	MIS; 3; 2	NÜR; 1 Ret	NÜR; 2; 15	NÜR; 3; 6	RBR; 1; 6	RBR; 2; 4	RBR; 3; 8	HOC; 1; 3	**HOC**; **2**; 1	HOC; 3; 9	4th	284

^{†} As Vips was a guest driver, he was ineligible for points.

=== Complete Macau Grand Prix results ===
Year	Team	Car	Qualifying	Quali Race	Main race
2018	(Germany) Motopark	Dallara F317	14th	7th	19th
2019	(United Kingdom) Hitech Grand Prix	Dallara F3 2019	**1st**	**1st**	**2nd**

=== Complete FIA Formula 3 Championship results ===
(key) (Races in bold indicate pole position; races in italics indicate points for the fastest lap of top ten finishers)

Year	Entrant	1	2	3	4	5	6	7	8	9	10	11	12	13	14	15	16	DC	Points
2019	Hitech Grand Prix	CAT; FEA; 6	CAT; SPR; 2	LEC; FEA; 4	LEC; SPR; 17	RBR; FEA; 1	RBR; SPR; 6	**SIL**; **FEA**; 1	SIL; SPR; 15	HUN; FEA; 4	HUN; SPR; 4	SPA; FEA; 5	SPA; SPR; 21	MNZ; FEA; Ret	MNZ; SPR; 11	SOC; FEA; 8	SOC; SPR; 1	4th	141

=== Complete Super Formula results ===
(key) (Races in bold indicate pole position) (Races in italics indicate fastest lap)

Year	Entrant	Engine	1	2	3	4	5	6	7	DC	Points
2019	Team Mugen	Honda	SUZ	AUT	SUG	FUJ	MOT	OKA	SUZ; 18	23rd	0

=== Complete Formula Regional European Championship results ===
(key) (Races in bold indicate pole position) (Races in italics indicate fastest lap)

Year	Team	1	2	3	4	5	6	7	8	9	10	11	12	13	14	15	16	17	18	19	20	21	22	23	24	Pos	Points
2020	KIC Motorsport	MIS; 1 Ret	MIS; 2; 6	MIS; 3; 4	LEC; 1; 4	LEC; 2; 3	LEC; 3; 3	RBR; 1	RBR; 2	RBR; 3	MUG; 1; 2	MUG; 2; 10	MUG; 3 Ret	MNZ; 1	MNZ; 2	MNZ; 3	CAT; 1	CAT; 2	CAT; 3	IMO; 1	IMO; 2	IMO; 3	VLL; 1	VLL; 2	VLL; 3	8th	81

=== Complete FIA Formula 2 Championship results ===
(key) (Races in bold indicate pole position) (Races in italics indicate points for the fastest lap of top ten finishers)

Year	Entrant	1	2	3	4	5	6	7	8	9	10	11	12	13	14	15	16	17	18	19	20	21	22	23	24	25	26	27	28	DC	Points
2020	DAMS	RBR; FEA	RBR; SPR	RBR; FEA	RBR; SPR	HUN; FEA	HUN; SPR	SIL; FEA	SIL; SPR	SIL; FEA	SIL; SPR	CAT; FEA	CAT; SPR	SPA; FEA; 11	SPA; SPR; 11	MNZ; FEA; 11	MNZ; SPR; 9	MUG; FEA; 7	MUG; SPR; 3	SOC; FEA; Ret	SOC; SPR; 18	BHR; FEA	BHR; SPR	BHR; FEA	BHR; SPR					16th	16
2021	Hitech Grand Prix	BHR; SP1; 10	BHR; SP2; 16	BHR; FEA; 13	MCO; SP1; 5	MCO; SP2; 3	MCO; FEA; 8	BAK; SP1; 8	BAK; SP2; 1	BAK; FEA; 1	SIL; SP1; 2	SIL; SP2; 6	SIL; FEA; 7	MNZ; SP1; 8	MNZ; SP2; 6	MNZ; FEA; Ret	SOC; SP1; 2	SOC; SP2; C	SOC; FEA; Ret	JED; SP1; 3	JED; SP2; Ret	JED; FEA; 6‡	YMC; SP1; 12	YMC; SP2; Ret	YMC; FEA; 8					6th	120
2022	Hitech Grand Prix	BHR; SPR; 7	BHR; FEA; 3	JED; SPR; 2	JED; FEA; 10	IMO; SPR; 15	**IMO**; **FEA**; Ret	CAT; SPR; Ret	CAT; FEA; 17	MCO; SPR; 5	MCO; FEA; 3	BAK; SPR; 12	**BAK**; **FEA**; Ret	SIL; SPR; 12	SIL; FEA; 6	RBR; SPR; 5	RBR; FEA; 8	LEC; SPR; 11	LEC; FEA; 12	HUN; SPR; 2	HUN; FEA; 5	SPA; SPR; 14	SPA; FEA; 8	ZAN; SPR; 5	ZAN; FEA; 7	MNZ; SPR; 1	MNZ; FEA; 10	YMC; SPR; 12	YMC; FEA; 8	11th	114

^{‡} Half points awarded as less than 75% of race distance was completed.

=== Complete Formula One participations ===
(key) (Races in bold indicate pole position) (Races in italics indicate fastest lap)

Year	Entrant	Chassis	Engine	1	2	3	4	5	6	7	8	9	10	11	12	13	14	15	16	17	18	19	20	21	22	WDC	Points
2022	Oracle Red Bull Racing	Red Bull RB18	Red Bull RBPTH001 V6 t	BHR	SAU	AUS	EMI	MIA	ESP; TD	MON	AZE	CAN	GBR	AUT	FRA	HUN	BEL	NED	ITA	SIN	JPN	USA	MXC	SAP	ABU	–	–

=== American open-wheel racing results ===
==== IndyCar Series ====
Year	Team	No.	Chassis	Engine	1	2	3	4	5	6	7	8	9	10	11	12	13	14	15	16	17	18	Rank	Points	Ref
2023	Rahal Letterman Lanigan Racing	30	Dallara DW12	Honda	STP	TXS	LBH	ALA	IMS	INDY	DET	ROA	MOH	TOR	IOW	IOW	NSH	IMS	GTW	POR; 18	LAG; 24		33rd	18	
2024	Rahal Letterman Lanigan Racing	75	Dallara DW12	Honda	STP	THE	LBH	ALA	IMS	INDY	DET	ROA	LAG	MOH	IOW	IOW	TOR	GTW	POR; 19	MIL	MIL	NSH	39th	11	

=== Complete IMSA SportsCar Championship results ===
(key) (Races in bold indicate pole position; races in italics indicate fastest lap)

Year	Entrant	Class	Chassis	Engine	1	2	3	4	5	6	7	8	9	10	Rank	Points
2026	RLL Team McLaren	GTD Pro	McLaren 720S GT3 Evo	McLaren M840T 4.0 L Turbo V8	DAY; 12	SEB	LGA	DET	WGL	MOS	ELK	VIR	IMS	PET	42nd	222

Sporting positions
Preceded by Joey Mawson	ADAC Formula 4 Championship; Champion; 2017	Succeeded by Lirim Zendeli
