= 2021 Silverstone Formula 2 round =

(United Kingdom) 2021 Silverstone Formula 2 round
Round details
- Round 4 of 8 in the 2021 FIA Formula 2 Championship.
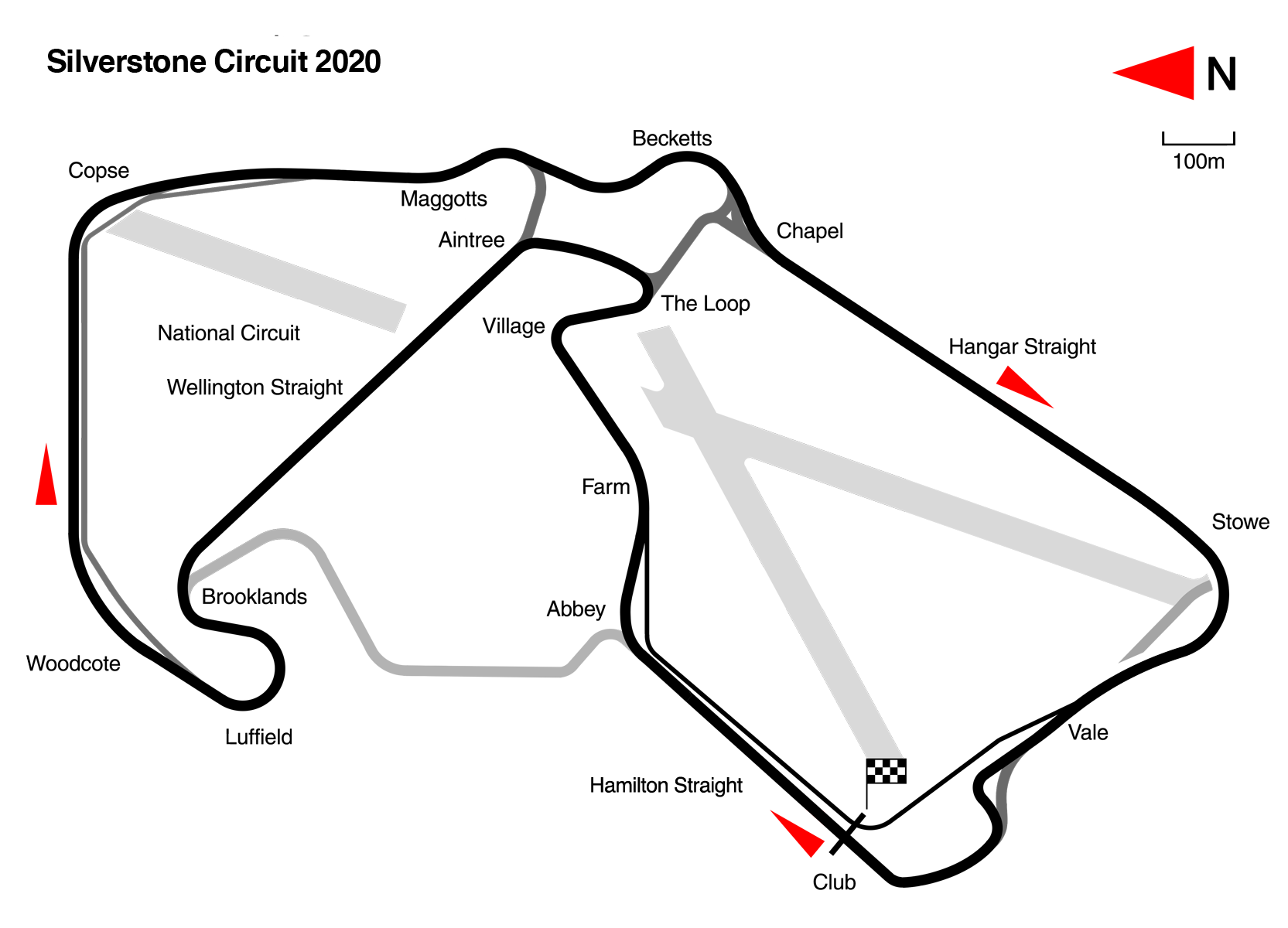
- Location: Silverstone Circuit, Silverstone, United Kingdom
- Course: Permanent Circuit; 5.891 km (3.661 mi)

Sprint race 1
- Date: 17 July 2021
- Laps: 21
Podium
First	(Russia) Robert Shwartzman	Prema Racing
Second	(Estonia) Jüri Vips	Hitech Grand Prix
Third	(Denmark) Christian Lundgaard	ART Grand Prix
Fastest lap
Driver	(Australia) Oscar Piastri	Prema Racing
- Time: 1:42.498 (on lap 21)

Sprint race 2
- Date: 17 July 2021
- Laps: 21
Podium
First	(Netherlands) Richard Verschoor	MP Motorsport
Second	(New Zealand) Marcus Armstrong	DAMS
Third	(United Kingdom) Dan Ticktum	Carlin
Fastest lap
Driver	(Australia) Oscar Piastri	Prema Racing
- Time: 1:42.846 (on lap 21)

Feature race
- Date: 18 July 2021
- Laps: 29
Pole position
Driver	(Australia) Oscar Piastri	Prema Racing
Time	1:39.854	
Podium
First	(China) Guanyu Zhou	UNI-Virtuosi Racing
Second	(United Kingdom) Dan Ticktum	Carlin
Third	(Australia) Oscar Piastri	Prema Racing
Fastest lap
Driver	(India) Jehan Daruvala	Carlin
- Time: 1:42.767 (on lap 27)

The 2021 Silverstone Formula 2 round was the fourth round of the 2021 Formula 2 Championship and took place at the Silverstone Circuit from 16 to 18 July. It ran in support of the 2021 British Grand Prix and featured three races, which were won by Robert Shwartzman, Richard Verschoor, who took his first ever win in Formula 2, and Guanyu Zhou respectively.

== Classification ==
=== Qualifying ===
Pos.	No.	Driver	Team	Time	Gap	Grid
1	2	(Australia) Oscar Piastri	Prema Racing	1:39.854	-	1
2	3	(China) Guanyu Zhou	UNI-Virtuosi	1:40.075	+0.221	2
3	11	(Netherlands) Richard Verschoor	MP Motorsport	1:40.259	+0.405	3
4	5	(United Kingdom) Dan Ticktum	Carlin	1:40.408	+0.554	4
5	10	(France) Théo Pourchaire	ART Grand Prix	1:40.419	+0.565	5
6	4	(Brazil) Felipe Drugovich	UNI-Virtuosi	1:40.451	+0.597	6
7	1	(Russia) Robert Shwartzman	Prema Racing	1:40.452	+0.598	7
8	16	(Israel) Roy Nissany	DAMS	1:40.486	+0.632	8
9	8	(Estonia) Jüri Vips	Hitech Grand Prix	1:40.491	+0.637	9
10	9	(Denmark) Christian Lundgaard	ART Grand Prix	1:40.556	+0.702	10
11	7	(New Zealand) Liam Lawson	Hitech Grand Prix	1:40.679	+0.825	11
12	6	(India) Jehan Daruvala	Carlin	1:40.683	+0.829	12
13	12	(Germany) Lirim Zendeli	MP Motorsport	1:40.772	+0.918	13
14	17	(New Zealand) Marcus Armstrong	DAMS	1:40.895	+1.041	14
15	21	(Switzerland) Ralph Boschung	Campos Racing	1:40.915	+1.061	15
16	20	(Italy) Matteo Nannini	Campos Racing	1:41.050	+1.196	16
17	24	(Netherlands) Bent Viscaal	Trident	1:41.185	+1.331	17
18	14	(Germany) David Beckmann	Charouz Racing System	1:41.295	+1.441	18
19	22	(United Kingdom) Jack Aitken	HWA Racelab	1:41.306	+1.452	19
20	15	(Brazil) Guilherme Samaia	Charouz Racing System	1:41.758	+1.904	20
21	25	(Japan) Marino Sato	Trident	1:41.790	+1.936	21
22	23	(Italy) Alessio Deledda	HWA Racelab	1:43.734	+3.880	22

=== Sprint race 1 ===
Pos.	No.	Driver	Entrant	Laps	Time/Retired	Grid	Points
1	1	(Russia) Robert Shwartzman	Prema Racing	21	42:34.300	4	15
2	8	(Estonia) Jüri Vips	Hitech Grand Prix	21	+0.971	2	12
3	9	(Denmark) Christian Lundgaard	ART Grand Prix	21	+2.534	1	10
4	4	(Brazil) Felipe Drugovich	UNI-Virtuosi	21	+5.041	5	8
5	10	(France) Théo Pourchaire	ART Grand Prix	21	+5.594	6	6
6	2	(Australia) Oscar Piastri	Prema Racing	21	+8.403	10	4 (2)
7	7	(New Zealand) Liam Lawson	Hitech Grand Prix	21	+11.640	11	2
8	5	(United Kingdom) Dan Ticktum	Carlin	21	+12.365	7	1
9	17	(New Zealand) Marcus Armstrong	DAMS	21	+12.795	14	
10	11	(Netherlands) Richard Verschoor	MP Motorsport	21	+13.640	8	
11	12	(Germany) Lirim Zendeli	MP Motorsport	21	+14.222	13	
12	6	(India) Jehan Daruvala	Carlin	21	+16.694	12	
13	14	(Germany) David Beckmann	Charouz Racing System	21	+17.215	18	
14	21	(Switzerland) Ralph Boschung	Campos Racing	21	+19.347	15	
15	20	(Italy) Matteo Nannini	Campos Racing	21	+20.113	16	
16	24	(Netherlands) Bent Viscaal	Trident	21	+21.048	17	
17	22	(United Kingdom) Jack Aitken	HWA Racelab	21	+22.670	19	
DNF	25	(Japan) Marino Sato	Trident	17	Engine	21	
DNF	15	(Brazil) Guilherme Samaia	Charouz Racing System	11	Spun off	20	
DNF	23	(Italy) Alessio Deledda	HWA Racelab	3	Spun off	22	
DNF	16	(Israel) Roy Nissany	DAMS	0	Collision damage	3	
DNF	3	(China) Guanyu Zhou	UNI-Virtuosi	0	Spun off	9	
Fastest lap： (Australia) Oscar Piastri − Prema Racing − 1:42.498 (lap 21)

=== Sprint race 2 ===
Pos.	No.	Driver	Entrant	Laps	Time/Retired	Grid	Points
1	11	(Netherlands) Richard Verschoor	MP Motorsport	21	42:38.809	1	15
2	17	(New Zealand) Marcus Armstrong	DAMS	21	+1.202	2	12
3	5	(United Kingdom) Dan Ticktum	Carlin	21	+2.350	3	10
4	2	(Australia) Oscar Piastri	Prema Racing	21	+7.726	5	8 (2)
5	7	(New Zealand) Liam Lawson	Hitech Grand Prix	21	+12.161	4	6
6	8	(Estonia) Jüri Vips	Hitech Grand Prix	21	+14.879	9	4
7	4	(Brazil) Felipe Drugovich	UNI-Virtuosi	21	+15.522	7	2
8	14	(Germany) David Beckmann	Charouz Racing System	21	+16.562	13	1
9	12	(Germany) Lirim Zendeli	MP Motorsport	21	+18.150	11	
10	10	(France) Théo Pourchaire	ART Grand Prix	21	+18.619	6	
11	3	(China) Guanyu Zhou	UNI-Virtuosi	21	+19.583	22	
12	16	(Israel) Roy Nissany	DAMS	21	+21.141	21	
13	9	(Denmark) Christian Lundgaard	ART Grand Prix	21	+21.893	8	
14	20	(Italy) Matteo Nannini	Campos Racing	21	+23.047	15	
15	1	(Russia) Robert Shwartzman	Prema Racing	21	+24.329	10	
16	25	(Japan) Marino Sato	Trident	21	+26.701	18	
17	15	(Brazil) Guilherme Samaia	Charouz Racing System	21	+33.083	19	
18	22	(United Kingdom) Jack Aitken	HWA Racelab	21	+35.937	17	
19	6	(India) Jehan Daruvala	Carlin	21	+42.390	12	
DNF	24	(Netherlands) Bent Viscaal	Trident	6	Collision	16	
DNF	21	(Switzerland) Ralph Boschung	Campos Racing	0	Collision	14	
DNF	23	(Italy) Alessio Deledda	HWA Racelab	0	Collision	20	
Fastest lap： (Australia) Oscar Piastri − Prema Racing − 1:42.846 (lap 21)

=== Feature Race ===
Pos.	No.	Driver	Entrant	Laps	Time/Retired	Grid	Points
1	3	(China) Guanyu Zhou	UNI-Virtuosi	29	51:07.552	2	25
2	5	(United Kingdom) Dan Ticktum	Carlin	29	+3.828	4	18
3	2	(Australia) Oscar Piastri	Prema Racing	29	+19.342	1	15 (4)
4	11	(Netherlands) Richard Verschoor	MP Motorsport	29	+20.128	3	12
5	1	(Russia) Robert Shwartzman	Prema Racing	29	+24.775	7	10
6	4	(Brazil) Felipe Drugovich	UNI-Virtuosi	29	+25.469	6	8
7	8	(Estonia) Jüri Vips	Hitech Grand Prix	29	+25.836	9	6
8	10	(France) Théo Pourchaire	ART Grand Prix	29	+26.651	5	4
9	12	(Germany) Lirim Zendeli	MP Motorsport	29	+27.421	13	2
10	6	(India) Jehan Daruvala	Carlin	29	+27.677	12	1 (2)
11	7	(New Zealand) Liam Lawson	Hitech Grand Prix	29	+39.951	11	
12	17	(New Zealand) Marcus Armstrong	DAMS	29	+40.516	14	
13	24	(Netherlands) Bent Viscaal	Trident	29	+44.372	17	
14	21	(Switzerland) Ralph Boschung	Campos Racing	29	+47.641	15	
15	14	(Germany) David Beckmann	Charouz Racing System	29	+47.812	18	
16	16	(Israel) Roy Nissany	DAMS	29	+49.492	8	
17	22	(United Kingdom) Jack Aitken	HWA Racelab	29	+51.977	19	
18	20	(Italy) Matteo Nannini	Campos Racing	29	+52.326	16	
19	25	(Japan) Marino Sato	Trident	29	+53.708	21	
20	15	(Brazil) Guilherme Samaia	Charouz Racing System	29	+1:02.605	20	
21	9	(Denmark) Christian Lundgaard	ART Grand Prix	29	+1:30.203	10	
22	23	(Italy) Alessio Deledda	HWA Racelab	28	+1 lap	22	
Fastest lap： (India) Jehan Daruvala − Carlin − 1:42.767 (lap 27)

== Standings after the event ==
Drivers' Championship standings

	Pos.	Driver	Points
1	1	(Australia) Oscar Piastri	108
1	2	(China) Guanyu Zhou	103
	3	(Russia) Robert Shwartzman	91
1	4	(United Kingdom) Dan Ticktum	89
1	5	(Estonia) Jüri Vips	85

Teams' Championship standings

	Pos.	Team	Points
	1	(Italy) Prema Racing	199
	2	(United Kingdom) UNI-Virtuosi Racing	162
1	3	(United Kingdom) Carlin	145
1	4	(United Kingdom) Hitech Grand Prix	143
	5	(France) ART Grand Prix	93

- Note: Only the top five positions are included for both sets of standings.

== See also ==
- 2021 British Grand Prix

Previous round: 2021 Baku Formula 2 round	FIA Formula 2 Championship; 2021 season	Next round: 2021 Monza Formula 2 round
Previous round: 2020 Silverstone Formula 2 round	Silverstone Formula 2 round	Next round: 2022 Silverstone Formula 2 round
