= Cristina Alesci =

CNN and CNNMoney correspondent

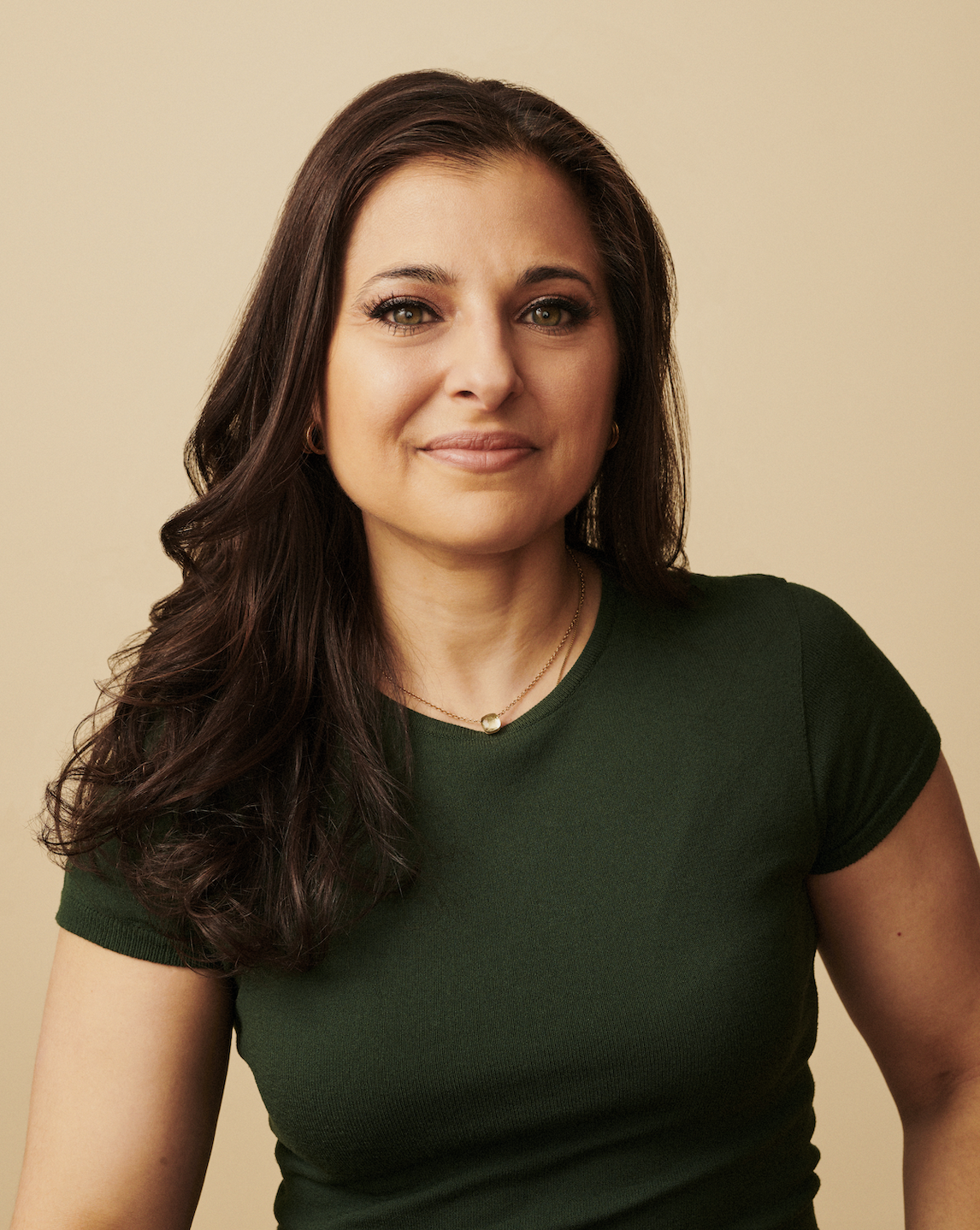
- Cristina Alesci
- Born: Queens, New York
- Education: Craig Newmark Graduate School of Journalism at the City University of New York (MA); Pace University (BA)
- Occupation: Chief Corporate Affairs Officer
- Employers: Chobani (2020–2022); CNN (2014–2020); Bloomberg News; Bloomberg Television
- Notable credits: CNN International; HLN; Bloomberg Television; Raw Ingredients
- Board member of: Craig Newmark Graduate School of Journalism

Cristina Alesci was the Chief Corporate Affairs Officer at Chobani until March 2022. Until December 2020, she was a CNN and CNNMoney correspondent based at the network’s New York bureau. She covered breaking news for the network as well as financial fraud and controversies facing major companies. Her investigative series focused on public policy issues of the 2016 election cycle, food production, and documenting the early struggles of successful leaders.

== Education ==
In 2008, Alesci graduated with a M.A. in Journalism with honors from City University of New York's Graduate School of Journalism. While at the school, she broke a story that gained national recognition. Her reporting uncovered an FBI file on journalist David Halberstam in the mid-1960s. The story was followed by the Associated Press, Politico, and the Huffington Post. Before getting her masters, she graduated magna cum laude from Pace University in New York City, earning a B.S. in Criminal Justice. Additionally, she received a post-baccalaureate certificate in business from Columbia University.

== Career ==
After freelancing for several local New York City publications and an internship at the New York Daily News, Alesci started as a reporter for Bloomberg News where she covered mergers and acquisitions, private equity and venture capital. She broke news on the biggest deals of the decade, including Facebook’s initial public offering and Dell’s takeover battle. She later transitioned to Bloomberg Television.

=== CNN ===
In 2014, Alesci joined CNN where she frequently appears on the network’s Newsroom programs, CNN International, and HLN. She also writes for its websites. In her role as a business reporter, Alesci has interviewed leading CEOs, including Starbucks' CEO Howard Schultz, JP Morgan chief executive Jamie Dimon and J.Crew's Mickey Drexler. In 2016, Alesci created the docu-series "Raw Ingredients" for CNN, about the food industry in the United States.

=== Business career ===
Alesci joined Chobani in 2020 as the company's chief corporate affairs officer where she is responsible for internal and external communications, philanthropy, social impact, community efforts and government relations. She exited the company in March 2022.

== Personal life ==
In 2016, Alesci was diagnosed with adult onset Type 1 diabetes, about which she has written in various publications, including the Huffington Post and CNN Opinion."

Alesci is a board member of Craig Newmark Graduate School of Journalism at CUNY. She grew up in Queens, New York, where her parents emigrated to from Italy.

== See also ==
- New Yorkers in journalism
