= Alessio Locatelli =

Italian footballer (born 1978)

Personal information
- Date of birth: 17 March 1978 (age 48)
- Place of birth: Milan, Italy
- Height: 1.90 m (6 ft 3 in)
- Position: Goalkeeper

Team information
- Current team: Lecco (GK coach)

Senior career*
Years	Team	Apps	(Gls)
2004–2005	Pro Vercelli	4	(0)
2005–2007	Spezia	1	(0)
2008	Botev Plovdiv	1	(0)
2009	Sorrento	0	(0)
2011	Brindisi	7	(0)

Managerial career
- 2018–2019: Lecco (GK coach)
- 2019–2022: Pavia (GK coach)
- 2022–: Lecco (GK coach)
- * Club domestic league appearances and goals

Alessio Locatelli (born 17 March 1978) is an Italian football coach and a former goalkeeper. He is the goalkeeping coach at Lecco. Amongst the teams he played for are Pro Vercelli, Spezia Calcio and Botev.

== Career ==
Locatelli signed with Botev for three years on 24 November 2008, but was quickly released for free for poor performances. He was given the №30 shirt. On 2 February 2009, he joined Sorrento along with Hodža.
