= Alessio Vrioni =

Albanian footballer (born 2004)

Personal information
- Full name: Alessio Vrioni
- Date of birth: 11 July 2004 (age 22)
- Place of birth: Macerata, Italy
- Height: 1.75 m (5 ft 9 in)
- Position: Left winger

Team information
- Current team: Urbania

Youth career
- –2021: Matelica
- 2021–2022: Ancona
- 2022: → SPAL (loan)

Senior career*
Years	Team	Apps	(Gls)
2021–2024	Ancona	8	(0)
2022–2024	→ Vigor Senigallia (loan)	51	(3)
2024–2025	Maceratese	0	(0)
2025–	Urbania	0	(0)

International career^{‡}
2022	Albania U19	3	(0)
- * Club domestic league appearances and goals as of 9 November 2025 ‡ National team caps and goals as of 9 November 2025

Alessio Vrioni (Albanian pronunciation: [aˈlɛsio vɾiˈɔni]; born 11 July 2004) is a professional footballer who plays as a left winger for Urbania in the Eccellenza Marche. Born in Italy, he represented Italy and Albania at youth international level.

== Club career ==
=== Early career ===
Vrioni began his football journey with local club Matelica, where he stood out in the youth sector for his technical ability and attacking movement. In 2019, he received a call-up to the Italy U15 amateur representative side.

=== Ancona ===
In 2021, Vrioni joined Ancona and made his senior debut in Serie C, featuring in eight matches during the 2021–22 season. In March 2022, he spent a short two-week loan spell with SPAL’s youth side for development purposes.

=== Vigor Senigallia ===
In July 2022, Vrioni moved on loan to Vigor Senigallia, where he spent two seasons in Serie D. During the 2022–23 campaign, he made 28 league appearances and scored once, while in the following 2023–24 season he recorded 23 appearances and two goals.

=== Maceratese ===
In July 2024, Vrioni signed for Maceratese, returning to his home region of Marche. He spent one season with the club before moving to Urbania in mid-2025.

== International career ==
Vrioni was born in Italy to Albanian parents and has represented both nations at youth level. He was first called up in 2019 to the Italy U15 amateur selection while playing for Matelica. In 2022, he opted to represent Albania U19, featuring in three friendly matches under coach Armando Cungu.

== Personal life ==
Vrioni is the younger brother of Albanian international striker Giacomo Vrioni.

== Career statistics ==
As of match played 9 November 2025

Appearances and goals by club, season and competition
Club	Season	League			Cup		Other		Total	
Club	Season	Division	Apps	Goals	Apps	Goals	Apps	Goals	Apps	Goals
Ancona	2021–22	Serie C	8	0	—		—		8	0
Vigor Senigallia	2022–23	Serie D	28	1	—		—		28	1
Vigor Senigallia	2023–24	Serie D	23	2	—		—		23	2
Vigor Senigallia	Career total		59	3	—		—		59	3
