= Harry Alessio =

Australian rules footballer

Personal information
- Full name: Henry Harold Alessio
- Born: 22 December 1895; Fitzroy, Victoria
- Died: 16 February 1973 (aged 77); Prahran, Victoria
- Original team: North Melbourne Juniors
- Height: 175 cm (5 ft 9 in)
- Weight: 71 kg (157 lb)

Playing career^{1}
Years	Club	Games (Goals)
1915–1919	Richmond	38 (34)
- ^{1} Playing statistics correct to the end of 1919.

Henry Harold Alessio (22 December 1895 – 16 February 1973) was an Australian rules footballer.

== Playing career ==
Alessio, a North Melbourne junior, played 38 games for Richmond in the Victorian Football League between 1915 and 1919.
