= Alessi (surname) =

Alessi is an Italian surname, derived from the given name Alessio (Alexis). Notable people with the surname include:

- Alberto Alessi (1939–2022), Italian lawyer and politician
- Andrea Alessi (1425–1505), Venetian Dalmatian architect and sculptor
- Daniel Alessi (born 1997), Australian football (soccer) player
- Dario Alessi (born 1967) British biochemist
- Diego Alessi (born 1973), Italian race car driver
- Galeazzo Alessi (1512–1572), Italian architect
- Giuseppe Alessi (1905–2009), President of the Regional Government of Sicily from 1947 to 1949 and again from 1955 to 1956
- Giuseppe Alessi (soccer player) (born 1977), Italian footballer
- James G. Alessi, American physicist
- Joseph Alessi (born 1959), American trombonist
- Marc Alessi (born 1976), American politician
- Mark Alessi (1953–2019), American businessman and comic publisher
- Mary Alessi (born 1968), American Christian songwriter
- Mike Alessi (born 1988), American motorcycle racer
- Ottavio Alessi (1919–1978), Italian screenwriter, producer and film director
- Ralph Alessi (born 1963), American jazz trumpeter and composer
- Raquel Alessi (born 1983), American actress

== Fictional characters ==
- Benito Alessi and his family, a fictional family on the Australian television series Neighbours

== See also ==
- Andrija Aleši, Albanian sculptor
