= Alessio Deledda =

Italian racing driver

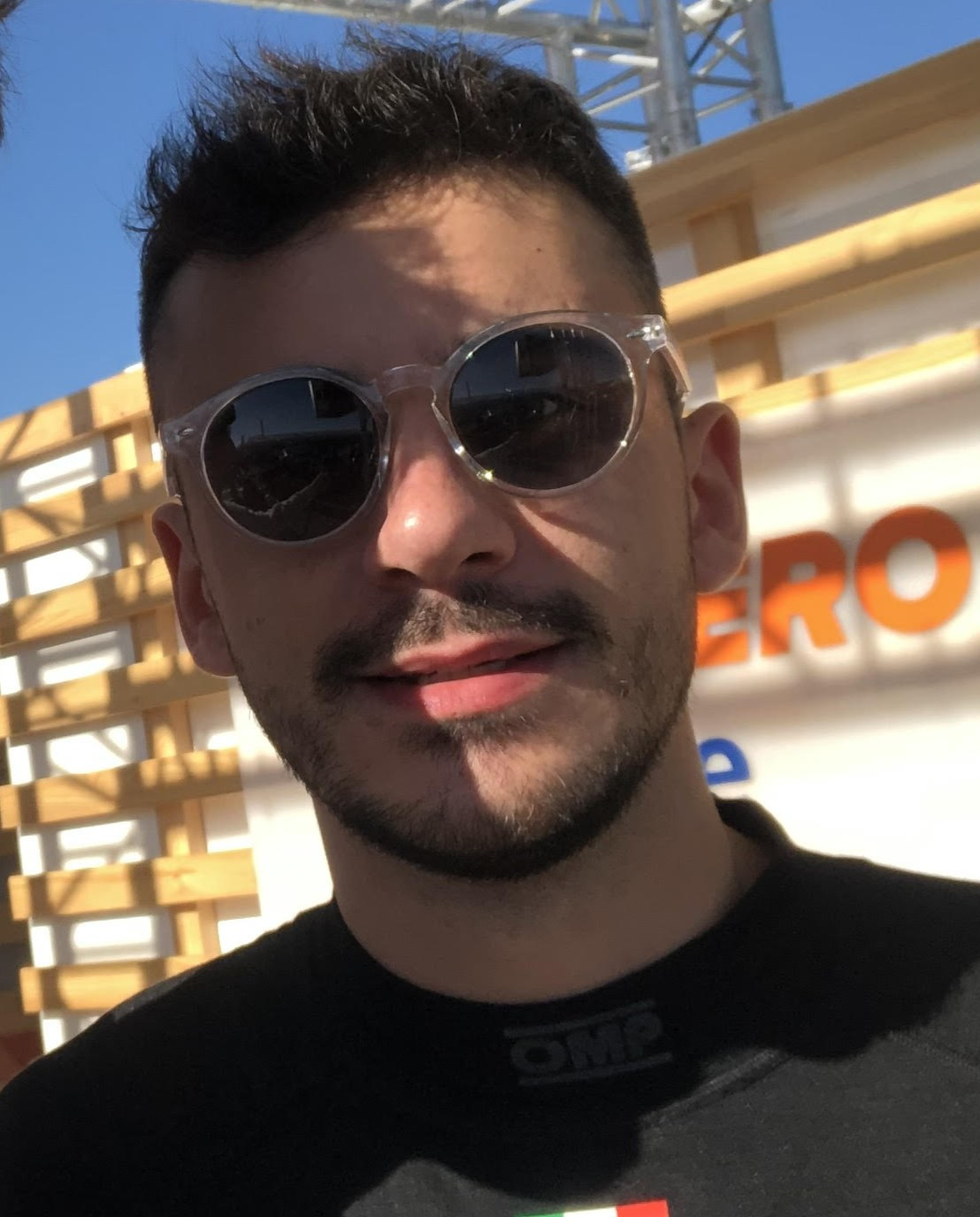
- Deledda in 2022
- Nationality: (Italy) Italian
- Born: 10 December 1994 (age 31) Genzano di Roma, Italy

GTWC Europe Endurance Cup career
- Debut season: 2025
- Categorisation: FIA Silver
- Teams: Vincenzo Sospiri Racing
- Car number: 60
- Starts: 1 (1 entries)
- Wins: 0
- Podiums: 0
- Poles: 0
- Fastest laps: 0

Previous series
- 2024 2024 2022–23 2021 2021 2020 2019–20 2019 2019 2018: International GT Open; Italian GT Championship; Deutsche Tourenwagen Masters; FIA Formula 2 Championship; F3 Asian Championship; FIA Formula 3 Championship; F3 Asian Championship; FIA Formula 3 Championship; Formula Renault Eurocup; Italian F4 Championship

Alessio Deledda (born 10 December 1994) is an Italian racing driver. He currently competes in the 2025 GT World Challenge Europe Endurance Cup with Vincenzo Sospiri Racing. Deledda previously raced in the International GT Open and the DTM.

== Early career ==
=== Beginnings ===
Deledda was born in Genzano di Roma. He did not start in karting like most racing drivers. Among other things, he participated in the Italian Superstock 600 motorcycle championship in 2017. After little success, he switched to auto racing in 2018 and made his Formula 4 debut in the Italian F4 Championship, racing for Technorace, an Italian team dedicated to bringing drivers up the junior ranks.

Deledda struggled through his debut season and scored no points. With 17th place at Monza as his best result, he finished in 39th place in the championship, and only 16th among the rookie drivers.

=== FIA Formula 3 Championship ===
==== 2019 ====
In 2019, Deledda started the season in the winter championship of the Euroformula Open Championship, where he drove for Campos Racing. The two-races took place solely at Circuit Paul Ricard, and Deledda finished the races in eighth and ninth place. Subsequently, he made the switch to the new FIA Formula 3 Championship, in which he also drove for Campos. Deledda had a rough debut Formula 3 season, and finished 29th.

==== 2020 ====
Despite this, Deledda was retained for the 2020 F3 season, and partnered 2019 teammates Alex Peroni and German Sophia Flörsch. By the conclusion of his second season in Formula 3, his best finish had been 16th place, while all of his other finishes across several dozen races had been 20th or lower.

=== FIA Formula 2 Championship ===
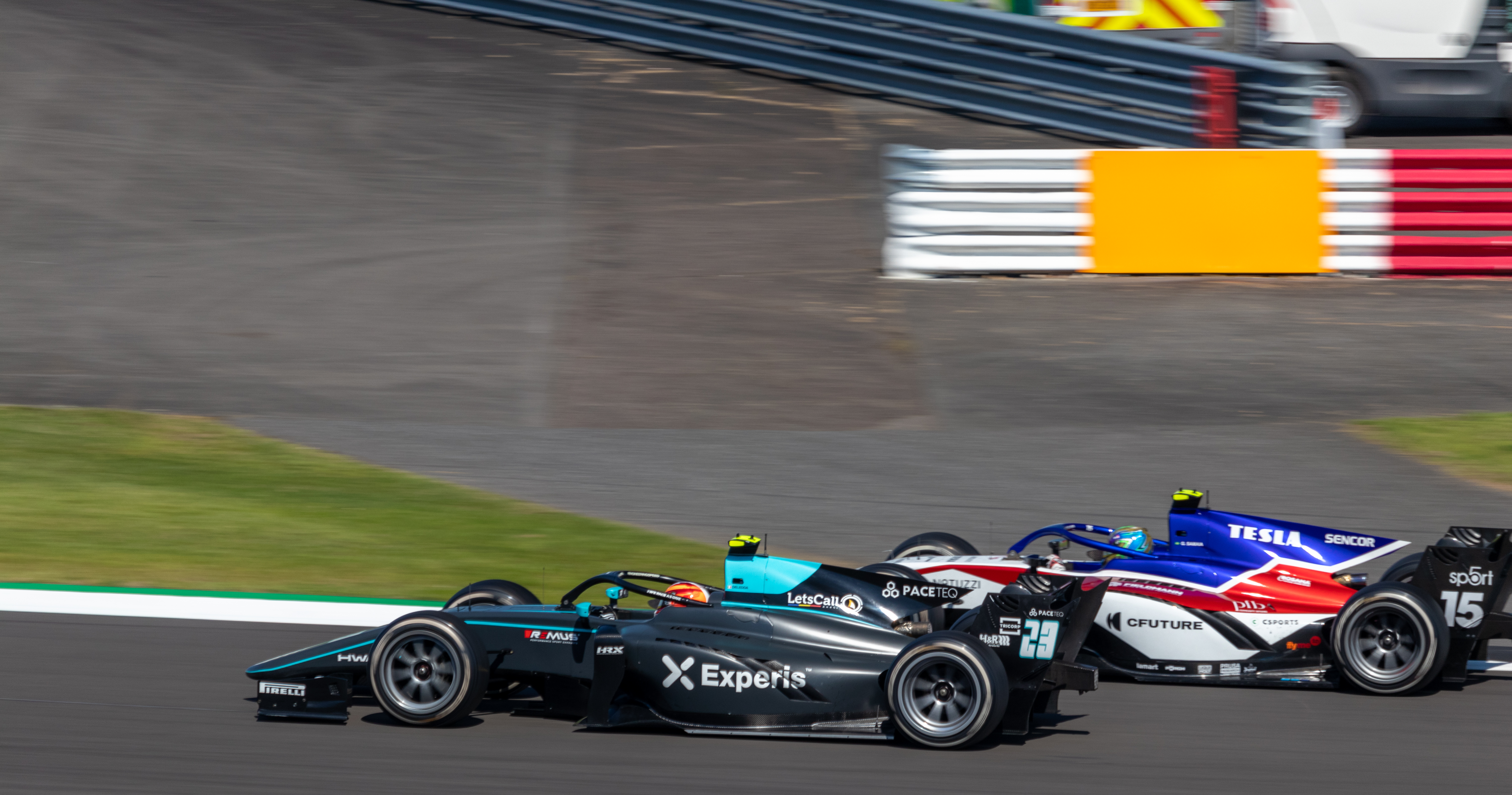
Deledda (car in front) driving the Dallara F2 2018 at the 2021 Silverstone Formula 2 round

On January 22, 2021, Deledda was announced to be signing for HWA Racelab in Formula 2, partnering fellow countryman Matteo Nannini.

At the second round of the season in Monaco, Deledda qualified 6.8 seconds slower than polesitter Théo Pourchaire, which was outside of the 107% rule. Despite this, he was given permission to start the races from 22nd and last place on the grid. He finished the season 25th in the driver's championship standings, with no points scored, whereas even Mahaveer Raghunathan scored one point who Deledda was usually compared with as "the worst Formula 2 driver".

== Sportscar career ==
=== DTM (2022–2023) ===
For the 2022 season, Deledda left single-seaters to join the Deutsche Tourenwagen Masters, driving a Lamborghini Huracán GT3 Evo for Grasser Racing. He scored his only point of the campaign during the final race at Hockenheim and finished 26th in the standings.

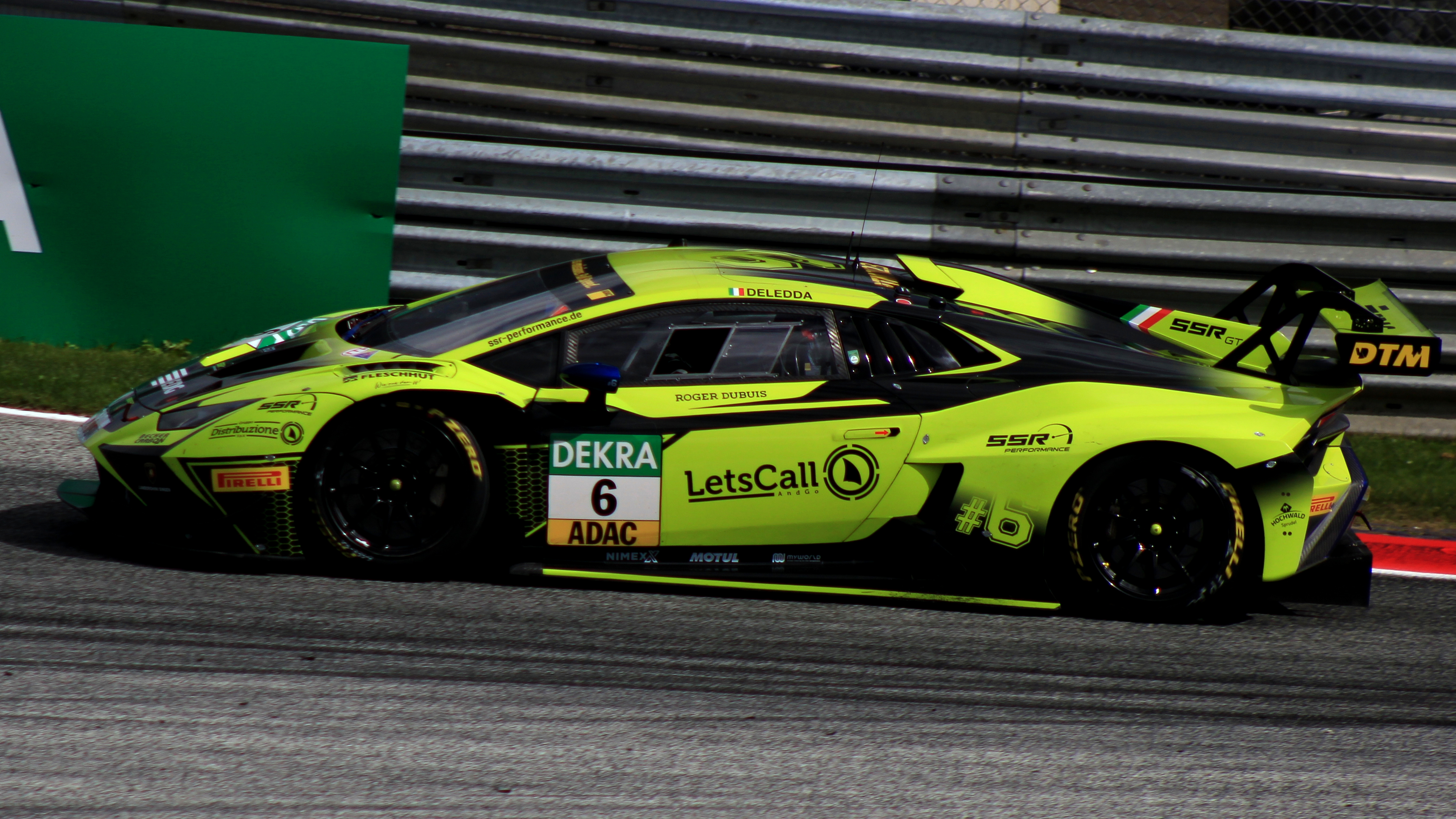
Deledda in 2023

Deledda took part in the 24 Hours of Daytona at the start of 2023, competing for NTE Sport in the GTD category.

Deledda's main campaign would once again lie in the DTM, where he teamed up with Mirko Bortolotti and Franck Perera at SSR Performance. With a best race finish of 18th, the Italian ended up 32nd in the standings, failing to score points throughout the year.

=== International GT Open (2024) ===
For the 2024 season, Deledda entered the International GT Open as part of the Oregon Team, driving alongside Lamborghini factory driver Jordan Pepper. At the second round in Hockenheim, Deledda was able to inherit second place following Pepper's stint, before passing Anthony Bartone to take his first win in GT3 competition. Subsequently, Deledda and Pepper finished second in the IGTO's endurance event at Spa, before following up with points finishes in Hungary and a podium at Le Castellet. Deledda and Pepper claimed victory in race 1 at Spielberg, with Pepper driving out a lead from pole position and Deledda consolidating the advantage in drizzly conditions. More points followed in the subsequent three races, and Deledda went into the final round at Monza equal on points with the championship-leading Eastalent Racing crew. However, the team suffered a late puncture while behind the Eastalent car in the closing stages of the race, confirming Deledda's runner-up spot in the standings.

=== GT World Challenge Europe and Italian GT (2025) ===
Deledda raced in both the Silver Cup of the GT World Challenge Europe Endurance Cup, as well as the Italian GT Championship Sprint Cup, during 2025. Despite scoring a class pole at the opening round of the Endurance Cup season, Deledda finished 27th in the championship standings. In the Italian series, he ended up 11th overall in the latter with a best race result of fourth.

=== McLaren affiliation ===
In April 2026, it was announced that Deledda would become a McLaren GT3 Junior driver, which included campaigns in the Italian GT Championship Endurance Cup and McLaren Trophy Europe.

== Controversy ==
On 26 November 2020, Deledda caused a stir after publishing several videos on his Instagram profile of himself driving recklessly and with high speed on an Italian motorway near Pomezia, Lazio. In one of the videos he slalomed around many cars during a traffic jam, and in another video he filmed the dashboard of his own car reaching 300 km/h in the process. A third video showed a point-of-view shot driving a Lamborghini Urus on a public road, reaching again around 200 km/h while driving with one arm on the steering wheel. Deledda was criticized by former F1 driver Giedo van der Garde, along with a handful of other notable F1 personalities.

Deledda posted a statement in Italian on his Twitter on November 27, saying that he's sorry they associated the video with his name and that his intent was and will always be to "raise awareness" among his followers about "similar acts of villainy". He went on to say that his mistake was "probably not to specify that it was an act of complaint".

== Racing record ==
=== Career summary ===
Season	Series	Team	Races	Wins	Poles	F/Laps	Podiums	Points	Position
2018	Italian F4 Championship	Technorace	20	0	0	0	0	0	39th
2019	FIA Formula 3 Championship	Campos Racing	16	0	0	0	0	0	29th
2019	Euroformula Open Winter Series	Campos Racing	2	0	0	0	0	6	9th
2019	Macau Grand Prix	Campos Racing	1	0	0	0	0	0	25th
2019	Formula Renault Eurocup	GRS	11	0	0	0	0	0	24th
2019	FIA Central European Zone Circuit Championship - F3	N/A	2	1	?	?	2	43	4th
2019–20	F3 Asian Championship	Hitech Grand Prix	15	0	0	0	0	21	15th
2020	FIA Formula 3 Championship	Campos Racing	18	0	0	0	0	0	34th
2020	Lamborghini Super Trofeo Europe - Pro Cup	VS Racing	2	0	0	0	0	4	20th
2021	FIA Formula 2 Championship	HWA Racelab	23	0	0	0	0	0	25th
2021	F3 Asian Championship	Pinnacle Motorsport	15	0	0	0	0	9	15th
2022	Deutsche Tourenwagen Masters	GRT Grasser-Racing.com	16	0	0	0	0	1	26th
2023	Deutsche Tourenwagen Masters	SSR Performance	16	0	0	0	0	0	32nd
2023	IMSA SportsCar Championship - GTD	NTE Sport	1	0	0	0	0	120	69th
2023	GT World Challenge Europe Sprint Cup	Tresor Attempto Racing	2	0	0	0	0	0	NC
2023	GT World Challenge Europe Sprint Cup - Silver Cup	Tresor Attempto Racing	2	0	0	0	0	6	19th
2023	Italian GT Sprint Championship - GT3	Oregon Team	2	0	0	0	0	0	NC†
2024	International GT Open	Oregon Team	14	2	0	0	4	108	**2nd**
2024	Italian GT Endurance Championship - GT3 Pro-Am	Imperiale Racing	2	0	0	0	0	22	NC
2025	GT World Challenge Europe Endurance Cup	VSR	5	0	0	0	0	0	NC
2025	GT World Challenge Europe Endurance Cup - Silver Cup	VSR	5	0	1	0	0	12	27th
2025	Italian GT Championship Sprint Cup - GT3	VSR	8	0	0	0	0	33	11th
2026	Italian GT Championship Endurance Cup - GT3	CSA Racing	2	0	0	0	0	0	NC
2026	Italian GT Championship Endurance Cup - GT3	Raptor Engineering	2	0	0	0	0	0	NC
2026	McLaren Trophy Europe - Pro	CSA Racing	4	0	0	0	0	6*	11th*

* Season still in progress.

=== Complete Italian F4 Championship results ===
(key) (Races in bold indicate pole position; races in italics indicate fastest lap)

Year	Team	1	2	3	4	5	6	7	8	9	10	11	12	13	14	15	16	17	18	19	20	21	Pos	Points
2018	Technorace	ADR; 1; 26	ADR; 2 Ret	ADR; 3; 22	LEC; 1; 27	LEC; 2; 30	LEC; 3; 29	MNZ; 1; 19	MNZ; 2; 17	MNZ; 3; 18	MIS; 1; 22	MIS; 2 Ret	MIS; 3; 19	IMO; 1; 21	IMO; 2; 23	IMO; 3; 19	VLL; 1; 18	VLL; 2; 21	VLL; 3; 19	MUG; 1; 21	MUG; 2 Ret	MUG; 3; 28	39th	0

=== Complete Formula Renault Eurocup results ===
(key) (Races in bold indicate pole position; races in italics indicate fastest lap)

Year	Team	1	2	3	4	5	6	7	8	9	10	11	12	13	14	15	16	17	18	19	20	Pos	Points
2019	GRS	MNZ; 1; 16	MNZ; 2 Ret	SIL; 1	SIL; 2	MON; 1; 15	MON; 2; 16	LEC; 1; 19	LEC; 2; 19	SPA; 1; 18	SPA; 2; 19	NÜR; 1	NÜR; 2	HUN; 1	HUN; 2	CAT; 1	CAT; 2	HOC; 1 DNS	HOC; 2 Ret	YMC; 1; 18	YMC; 2; 18	24th	0

=== Complete FIA Formula 3 Championship results ===
(key) (Races in bold indicate pole position; races in italics indicate points for the fastest lap of top ten finishers)

Year	Entrant	1	2	3	4	5	6	7	8	9	10	11	12	13	14	15	16	17	18	DC	Points
2019	Campos Racing	CAT; FEA; Ret	CAT; SPR; 23	LEC; FEA; 16	LEC; SPR; 23	RBR; FEA; 25	RBR; SPR; 24	SIL; FEA; Ret	SIL; SPR; 25	HUN; FEA; 24	HUN; SPR; 26	SPA; FEA; 28	SPA; SPR; 20	MNZ; FEA; 23	MNZ; SPR; 25	SOC; FEA; 21	SOC; SPR; 22			29th	0
2020	Campos Racing	RBR; FEA; 29	RBR; SPR; 20	RBR; FEA; 27	RBR; SPR; 21	HUN; FEA; 20	HUN; SPR; 23	SIL; FEA; 23	SIL; SPR; 28	SIL; FEA; 25	SIL; SPR; Ret	CAT; FEA; 28	CAT; SPR; Ret	SPA; FEA; Ret	SPA; SPR; 23	MNZ; FEA; 23	MNZ; SPR; 22	MUG; FEA; 25	MUG; SPR; 26	34th	0

=== Complete Macau Grand Prix results ===
Year	Team	Car	Qualifying	Quali Race	Main race
2019	(Spain) Campos Racing	Dallara F3 2019	29th	24th	25th

=== Complete F3 Asian Championship results ===
(key) (Races in bold indicate pole position; races in italics indicate fastest lap)

Year	Entrant	1	2	3	4	5	6	7	8	9	10	11	12	13	14	15	DC	Points
2019–20	Hitech Grand Prix	SEP; 1; 11	SEP; 2; 13	SEP; 3; 12	DUB; 1; 13	DUB; 2 Ret	DUB; 3; 12	ABU; 1; 10	ABU; 2; 9	ABU; 3; 12	SEP; 1 Ret	SEP; 2; 9	SEP; 3; 10	CHA; 1; 7	CHA; 2; 10	CHA; 3; 13†	15th	21
2021	Pinnacle Motorsport	DUB; 1; 13	DUB; 2; 6	DUB; 3; 13	ABU; 1; 22	ABU; 2; 15	ABU; 3 Ret	ABU; 1; 16	ABU; 2; 13	ABU; 3; 15	DUB; 1; 17	DUB; 2; 10	DUB; 3; 16	ABU; 1; 13	ABU; 2; 13	ABU; 2 Ret	15th	9

^{†} Driver did not finish the race, but was classified as they completed over 75% of the race distance.

=== Complete FIA Formula 2 Championship results ===
(key) (Races in bold indicate pole position; races in italics indicate points for the fastest lap of top ten finishers)

Year	Entrant	1	2	3	4	5	6	7	8	9	10	11	12	13	14	15	16	17	18	19	20	21	22	23	24	DC	Points
2021	HWA Racelab	BHR; SP1; 18	BHR; SP2; Ret	BHR; FEA; Ret	MCO; SP1; 18	MCO; SP2; 12	MCO; FEA; 17	BAK; SP1; Ret	BAK; SP2; 15	BAK; FEA; 19	SIL; SP1; Ret	SIL; SP2; Ret	SIL; FEA; 22	MNZ; SP1; 13	MNZ; SP2; 19	MNZ; FEA; Ret	SOC; SP1; 18	SOC; SP2; C	SOC; FEA; 17	JED; SP1; Ret	JED; SP2; Ret	JED; FEA; 20	YMC; SP1; 18	YMC; SP2; Ret	YMC; FEA; 19	25th	0

=== Complete Deutsche Tourenwagen Masters results ===
(key) (Races in bold indicate pole position; races in italics indicate fastest lap)

Year	Entrant	Chassis	1	2	3	4	5	6	7	8	9	10	11	12	13	14	15	16	Rank	Points
2022	GRT Grasser Racing.com	Lamborghini Huracán GT3 Evo	ALG; 1; 22	ALG; 2; 23	LAU; 1; 19	LAU; 2; 21	IMO; 1; 22	IMO; 2; 16	NOR; 1 Ret	NOR; 2; 18	NÜR; 1; 20	NÜR; 2; 16	SPA; 1; 20	SPA; 2; 18	RBR; 1; 21	RBR; 2; 21	HOC; 1 Ret	HOC; 2; 10	26th	1
2023	SSR Performance	Lamborghini Huracán GT3 Evo	OSC; 1; 19	OSC; 2; 20	ZAN; 1; 24	ZAN; 2 Ret	NOR; 1; 19	NOR; 2 Ret	NÜR; 1 Ret	NÜR; 2 DSQ	LAU; 1 Ret	LAU; 2; 19	SAC; 1; 21	SAC; 2; 18	RBR; 1; 26	RBR; 2; 22	HOC; 1 Ret	HOC; 2 Ret	32nd	0

=== Complete IMSA SportsCar Championship results ===
(key) (Races in bold indicate pole position; races in italics indicate fastest lap)

Year	Entrant	Class	Make	Engine	1	2	3	4	5	6	7	8	9	10	11	Rank	Points
2023	NTE Sport	GTD	Lamborghini Huracán GT3 Evo 2	Lamborghini 5.2 L V10	DAY; 20	SEB	LBH	LGA	WGL	MOS	LIM	ELK	VIR	IMS	PET	69th	120

=== Complete GT World Challenge Europe results ===
==== GT World Challenge Europe Sprint Cup ====
(key) (Races in bold indicate pole position; races in italics indicate fastest lap)

Year	Team	Car	Class	1	2	3	4	5	6	7	8	9	10	Pos.	Points
2023	Tresor Attempto Racing	Audi R8 LMS Evo II	Silver	BRH; 1	BRH; 2	MIS; 1; 31	MIS; 2; 28	HOC; 1	HOC; 2	VAL; 1	VAL; 2	ZAN; 1	ZAN; 2	19th	6

==== GT World Challenge Europe Endurance Cup ====
(key) (Races in bold indicate pole position; races in italics indicate fastest lap)

Year	Team	Car	Class	1	2	3	4	5	6	7	Pos.	Points
2025	VSR	Lamborghini Huracán GT3 Evo 2	Silver	**LEC**; 25	MNZ; 35	SPA; 6H; 70†	SPA; 12H; 70†	SPA; 24H; Ret	NÜR; 51	CAT; 42	28th	12

=== Complete International GT Open results ===
(key) (Races in bold indicate pole position; races in italics indicate fastest lap)

Year	Team	Car	Class	1	2	3	4	5	6	7	8	9	10	11	12	13	14	Pos.	Points
2024	Oregon Team	Lamborghini Huracán GT3 Evo 2	Pro	ALG; 1; 11	ALG; 2; 21	HOC; 1; 1	HOC; 2; 5	SPA; 2	HUN; 1; 7	HUN; 2; 7	LEC; 1; 5	LEC; 2; 3	**RBR**; **1**; 1	RBR; 2; 9	CAT; 1; 5	CAT; 2; 4	MNZ; 7	2nd	108
