= 1960 New Zealand Grand Prix =

- New Zealand Grand Prix
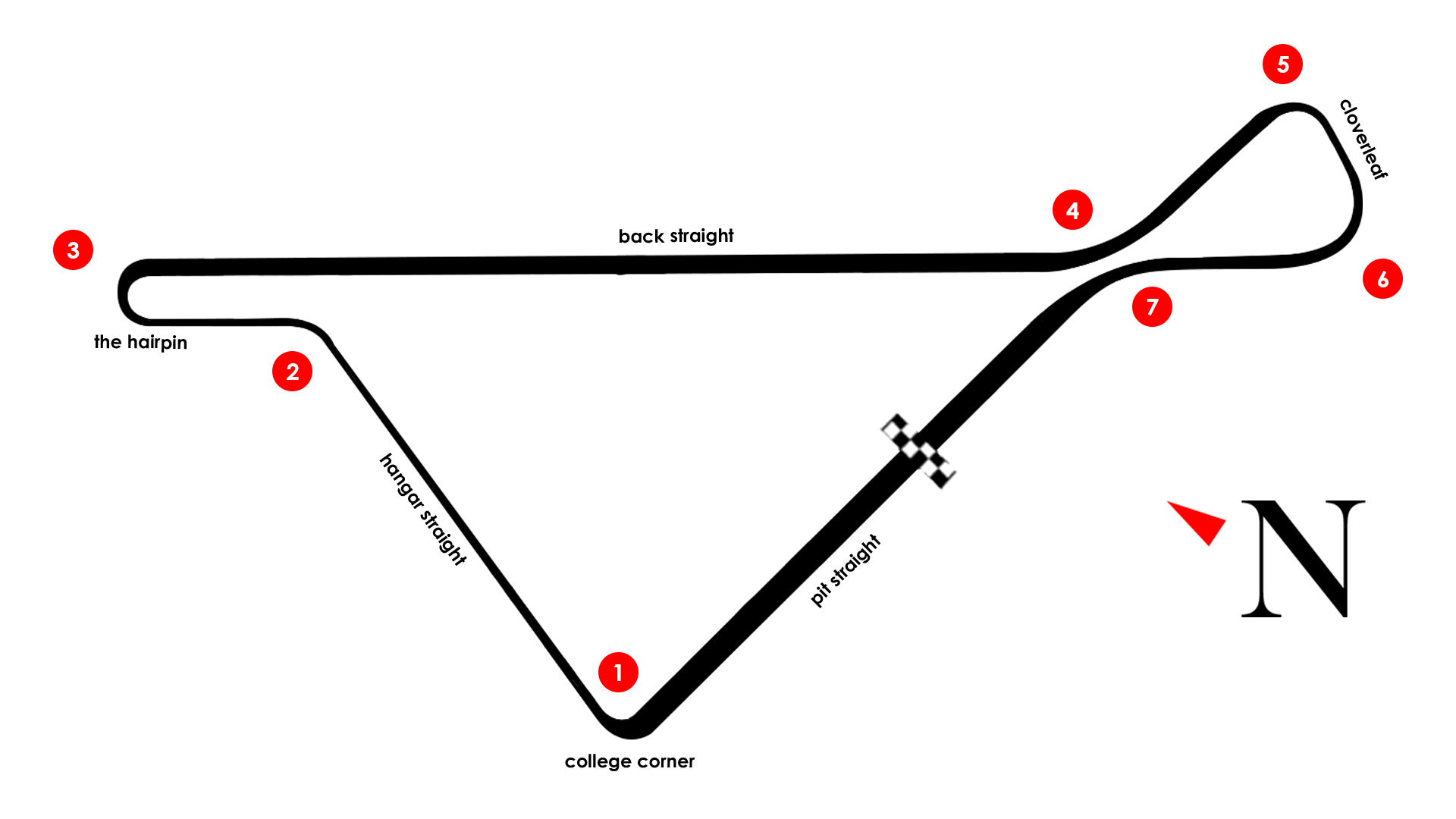

Race details
- Date: 9 January 1960
- Location: Ardmore Circuit, Auckland, New Zealand
- Course: Temporary racing facility
- Course length: 3.2 km (2.0 miles)
- Distance: 75 laps, 240 km (150 miles)
- Weather: Sunny

Pole position
Driver	(United Kingdom) Stirling Moss	Cooper T51

Fastest lap
Driver	(United Kingdom) Stirling Moss	Cooper T51
- Time: 1:21.2

Podium
First	(Australia) Jack Brabham	Cooper T51
Second	(New Zealand) Bruce McLaren	Cooper T45
Third	(Australia) Bib Stillwell	Cooper T51

The 1960 New Zealand Grand Prix was a motor race held at the Ardmore Circuit on 9 January 1960.

== Classification ==
Pos	No.	Driver	Car	Laps	Time	Grid
1	4	(Australia) Jack Brabham	Cooper T51 / Climax 2495cc 4cyl	75	1hr 43min 49.2sec	24
2	47	(New Zealand) Bruce McLaren	Cooper T45 / Climax 2495cc 4cyl	75	+ 0.6 s	2
3	6	(Australia) Bib Stillwell	Cooper T51 / Climax 2205cc 4cyl	72	+ 3 Laps	5
4	25	(Australia) Stan Jones	Cooper T51 / Climax 2205cc 4cyl	71	+ 4 Laps	6
5	17	(New Zealand) Johnny Mansel	Maserati 250F / Maserati 2497cc 6cyl	70	+ 5 Laps	10
6	12	(Australia) Arnold Glass	Maserati 250F / Maserati 2497cc 6cyl	68	+ 7 Laps	12
7	41	(New Zealand) Jim Palmer	Lotus 15 / Climax 1964cc 4cyl	68	+ 7 Laps	14
8	19	(New Zealand) Pat Hoare	Ferrari 256 / Ferrari 2996cc 4cyl	68	+ 7 Laps	15
9	2	(New Zealand) Ross Jensen	Maserati 250F / Maserati 2497cc 6cyl	66	+ 9 Laps	9
10	38	(New Zealand) Denny Hulme	Cooper T45 / Climax 1964cc 4cyl	66	+ 9 Laps	23
11	33	(New Zealand) Len Gilbert	Cooper-Bristol Mk II / Bristol 1971cc 6cyl	65	+ 10 Laps	19
12	88	(New Zealand) Ron Roycroft	Ferrari 375 / Ferrari 4493cc V12	63	+ 12 Laps	8
13	10	(New Zealand) Allan Freeman	Talbot-Lago T26C / Talbot 4485cc 6cyl	50	+ 25 Laps	17
Ret	3	(United Kingdom) Ian Burgess	Cooper T51 / Climax 2205cc 4cyl	44	Retired	4
Ret		(New Zealand) Arnold Stafford	Lotus 16 / Climax 1960cc 4cyl	36	Radius Arm	21
Ret	14	(Australia) Len Lukey	Cooper T45 / Climax 1964cc 4cyl	36	Retired	7
Ret	13	(New Zealand) Lionel Bulcraig	Cooper T43 / Climax 1498cc 4cyl	35	Retired	18
Ret	7	(United Kingdom) Stirling Moss	Cooper T51 / Climax 2495cc 4cyl	27	Clutch	1
Ret	18	(United Kingdom) David Piper	Lotus 16 / Climax 2495cc 4cyl	21	Driveshaft	3
Ret	9	(New Zealand) Ken Harris	Ferrari 750 Monza / Ferrari 2999cc 4cyl	20	Overheating	16
Ret	54	(New Zealand) George Lawton	Cooper T45 / Climax 1964cc 4cyl	11	Clutch	20
Ret		(New Zealand) Bob Smith	Ferrari Super Squalo 555 / Ferrari 3431cc 4cyl	9	Retired	22
Ret	11	(New Zealand) Malcolm Gill	Lycoming Special / Lycoming 4733cc 4cyl	6	Retired	13
Ret	39	(New Zealand) Ted Gray	Tornado / Chevrolet 4640cc V8	5	Retired	11
DNS	34	(New Zealand) Frank Shuter	Lotus 16 / Climax 1960cc 4cyl		Did not start	
DNQ	15	(New Zealand) John Windleburn	Lotus Eleven / Climax 1098cc 4cyl		Did not qualify	
DNQ	16	(New Zealand) Jack Weaver	JW-Citroen Special / Citroen 1999cc 4cyl		Did not qualify	
DNQ	24	(New Zealand) D.W. McKee	NZRA / Humber 1350cc 4cyl		Did not qualify	
DNQ	26	(New Zealand) Hector Green	RA / RA 2100cc 4cyl s/c		Did not qualify	
DNQ	36	(New Zealand) Steadman Kilgour	Maserati 6CM / Mercury 4500cc V8		Did not qualify	
DNQ	37	(New Zealand) Merv Neil	Cooper T39 / Climax 1498cc 4cyl		Did not qualify	
DNA	50	(New Zealand) Jack Malcolm	Cooper-Bristol Mk II / Holden 2258cc 6cyl		Did not arrive	
DNA	27	(New Zealand) Arthur Moffatt	Tojeiro 3/56 / Jaguar 3800cc 6cyl		Did not arrive	
DNA		(New Zealand) Brian Prescott	Cooper-Bristol Mk I / Bristol 1971cc 6cyl		Did not arrive	

Sporting positions
Preceded by 1959 New Zealand Grand Prix	New Zealand Grand Prix; 1960	Succeeded by 1961 New Zealand Grand Prix
