= 1962 New Zealand Grand Prix =

New Zealand motor race

- New Zealand Grand Prix
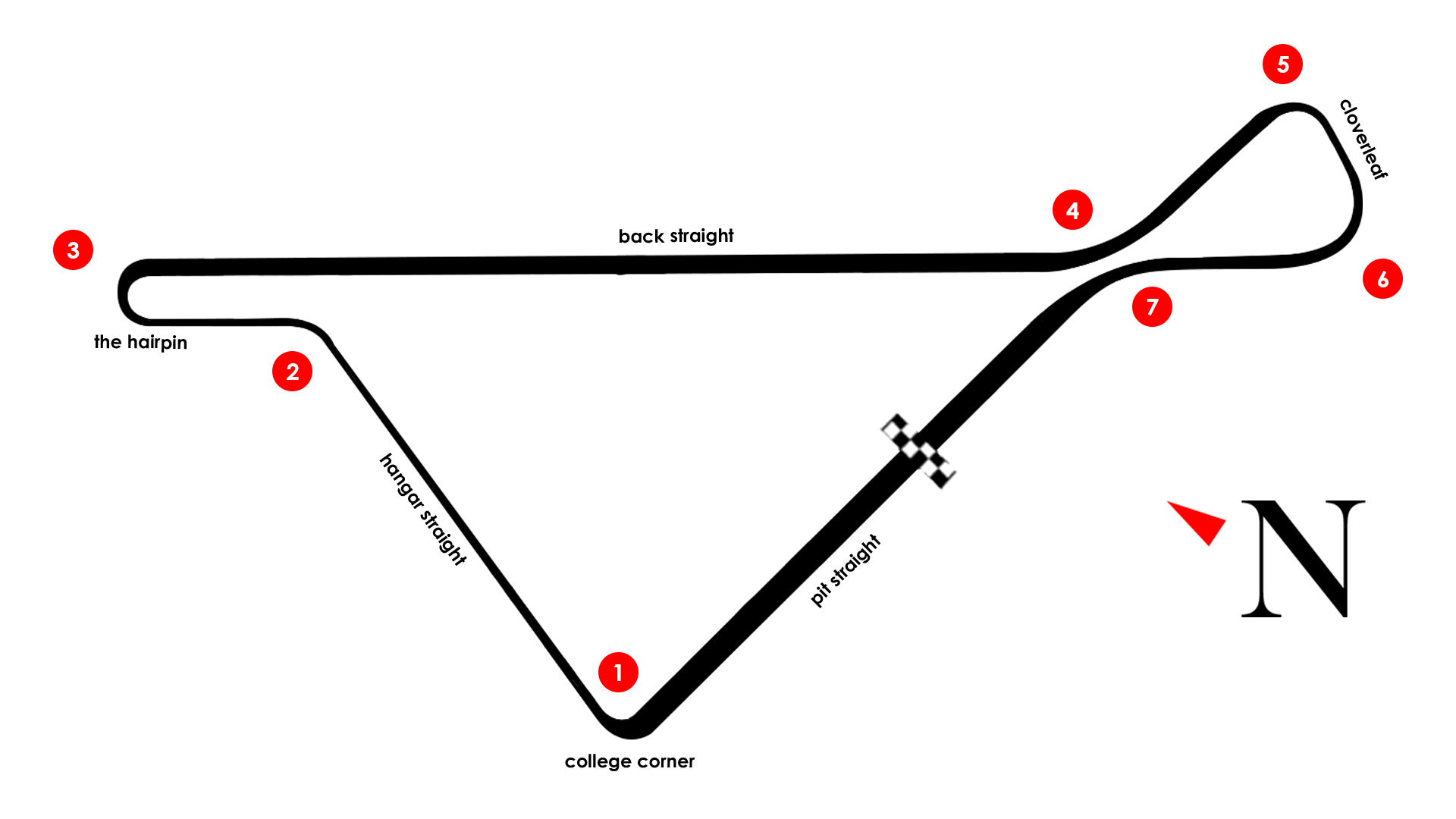

Race details
- Date: 6 January 1962
- Location: Ardmore Circuit, Auckland, New Zealand
- Course: Temporary racing facility
- Course length: 3.2 km (2.0 miles)
- Distance: 50 laps, 160 km (100 miles)
- Weather: Heavy rain

Pole position
| Driver | (New Zealand) Bruce McLaren | Cooper T53 |
- Time: 1:25.4

Fastest lap
| Driver | (United Kingdom) Stirling Moss | Lotus 21 |
- Time: 1:32.8

Podium
| First | (United Kingdom) Stirling Moss | Lotus 21 |
| Second | (United Kingdom) John Surtees | Cooper T53 |
| Third | (New Zealand) Bruce McLaren | Cooper T53 |

The 1962 New Zealand Grand Prix was a motor race held at the Ardmore Circuit on 6 January 1962. It was the ninth edition of the New Zealand Grand Prix and the final one to be held at the Ardmore Circuit. Following this event, the race would be moved to the Pukekohe Park Raceway south of Auckland.

Beset with heavy rainfall, Stirling Moss dominated proceedings to take his third New Zealand Grand Prix title in a highly-acclaimed drive. Fellow Grand Prix alumni John Surtees and Bruce McLaren rounded out the podium.

== Race report ==
All international entrants were driving Inter-Continental Formula cars - machines with a maximum capacity of 3 litres, as compared with the Formula One limit of 1.5 litres. The regular contingent of Moss, Surtees, McLaren and Jack Brabham had made the venture to New Zealand for the summer series races and the field boasted an array of local rising talent that included the likes of Chris Amon. However, Denny Hulme elected not to attend as he did not deem the venture financially viable. McLaren set the pace in practice and would capture pole position.

Weather heading into the weekend was horrendous with heavy rain plaguing track conditions and slowing the pace to a relative crawl. As a result, the race distance was shorted from the standard 150 miles to 100 for Saturday's race. Nevertheless, the venue boasted a 45,000-strong crowd for the event. Almost as soon as the flag fell to start the race, rain further intensified around the circuit. At the end of the first lap, Surtees led from McLaren, Brabham and Bib Stillwell. Moss, who had started from 21st on the grid, had worked his way up to fifth and, by the start of the third lap, had taken the lead from Surtees. Brabham meanwhile had opted for dry weather tyres for the start and greatly struggled to keep his car on track before a broken gear selector curtailed his race. College Corner proved a troublesome corner for the competitors with multiple drivers coming unstuck in the hay bales that lined it.

Aside from one spin on the pit straight after hitting a patch of standing water, it was a dominant performance from Moss. His fastest lap was 1.4 seconds faster than that of second-placed Surtees and over two seconds faster than the highly-favoured McLaren. Moss's drive was held to such acclaim that, during the prize-giving ceremony, Surtees remarked, "He's just not normal".

== Classification ==
| Pos | No. | Driver | Car | Laps | Time | Grid |
|---|---|---|---|---|---|---|
| 1 | 7 | (United Kingdom) Stirling Moss | Lotus 21 / Climax 2495cc 4cyl | 50 | 1hr 23min 14.3sec | 21 |
| 2 | | (United Kingdom) John Surtees | Cooper T53 / Climax 2750cc 4cyl | 50 | + 39.4 | 3 |
| 3 | | (New Zealand) Bruce McLaren | Cooper T53 / Climax 2750cc 4cyl | 48 | + 2 laps | 1 |
| 4 | | (United Kingdom) Roy Salvadori | Cooper T53 / Climax 2596cc 4cyl | 47 | + 3 laps | 5 |
| 5 | | (Italy) Lorenzo Bandini | Cooper T53 / Maserati 2890cc 4cyl | 45 | + 5 laps | 13 |
| 6 | | (New Zealand) Pat Hoare | Ferrari 256 / Ferrari 2953cc V12 | 45 | + 5 laps | 11 |
| 7 | | (New Zealand) Angus Hyslop | Cooper T53 / Climax 2495cc 4cyl | 45 | + 5 laps | 4 |
| 8 | | (Australia) Lex Davison | Cooper T53 / Climax 2495cc 4cyl | 44 | + 6 laps | 6 |
| 9 | | (New Zealand) Johnny Mansel | Cooper T51 / Maserati 2890cc 4cyl | 44 | + 6 laps | 15 |
| 10 | | (Australia) Bib Stillwell | Aston Martin DBR4-300 / Aston 2991cc 6cyl | 44 | + 6 laps | 7 |
| 11 | | (New Zealand) Chris Amon | Maserati 250F / Maserati 2495cc 6cyl | 43 | + 7 laps | 17 |
| 12 | | (New Zealand) Ross Greenville | Lotus 18 FJ / Ford 998cc 4cyl | 42 | + 8 laps | 18 |
| 13 | | (Australia) David McKay | Cooper T51 / Climax 2495cc 4cyl | 42 | + 8 laps | 9 |
| 14 | | (New Zealand) Bill Thomasen | Cooper T51 / Climax 1964cc 4cyl | 41 | + 9 laps | 16 |
| 15 | 41 | (New Zealand) Jim Palmer | Lotus 20 / Ford 1475cc 4cyl | 41 | + 9 laps | 14 |
| 16 | | (New Zealand) Forrest Cardon | Lycoming Special / Lycoming 5239cc 4cyl | 39 | + 11 laps | 19 |
| Ret | | (Australia) Jack Brabham | Cooper T55 / Climax 2750cc 4cyl | 32 | Gear selector | 2 |
| Ret | 9 | (Australia) Arnold Glass | BRM P48 / BRM 2497cc 4cyl | 15 | Retired | 10 |
| Ret | 8 | (United Kingdom) Ron Flockhart | Lotus 18 / Climax 2495cc 4cyl | 7 | Engine | 12 |
| Ret | 20 | (New Zealand) John Histed | Lola Mk2 / Ford 998cc 4cyl | 6 | Brakes | 20 |
| Ret | | (New Zealand) Tony Shelly | Cooper T45 / Climax 1964cc 4cyl | 1 | Suspension | 8 |
| DNQ | 25 | (New Zealand) Rex Flowers | Gemini Mk Illa FJ / Ford 998cc 4cyl | | Did not qualify | |
| DNQ | | (New Zealand) Len Gilbert | Cooper-Bristol Mk II / Holden 2258cc 6cyl | | Did not qualify | |
| DNQ | | (New Zealand) Bob Smith | Ferrari Super Squalo 555 / Ferrari 3431cc 4cyl | | Did not qualify | |
| DNQ | | (New Zealand) Hec Green | RA / RA 2100cc 4cyl s/c | | Did not qualify | |
| DNQ | | (New Zealand) Lou Stonnell | Lynx FJ / Ford 998cc 4cyl | | Did not qualify | |
| DNQ | | (New Zealand) Rod Coppins | Tec Mec 1 / Chevrolet 4600cc V8 | | Did not qualify | |
| DNQ | | (New Zealand) Scott Wiseman | Lotus 20 / Ford 998cc 4cyl | | Did not qualify | |
| DNQ | | (New Zealand) Peter Elford | Cooper-Bristol Mk I / Bristol 1971cc 6cyl | | Did not qualify | |
| DNA | | (New Zealand) David Evans | Cooper T43 / Climax 1964cc 4cyl | | Did Not Attend | |
| DNA | | (New Zealand) Roly Levis | Cooper T52 FJ / BMC 994cc 4cyl | | Did Not Attend | |
| DNA | | (New Zealand) Barry Thomas | Lynx FJ / Ford 998cc 4cyl | | Did Not Attend | |

== Aftermath ==
After having hosted the marquee event since 1954, the 1962 race would prove to be the last to be held on the Ardmore Circuit. With the building of a new airport in Māngere, Ardmore was reverted to operational status as an aerodrome and thus would no longer be available for motor racing.

Sporting positions
| Preceded by 1961 New Zealand Grand Prix | New Zealand Grand Prix; 1962 | Succeeded by 1963 New Zealand Grand Prix |
