= 1963 New Zealand Grand Prix =

- New Zealand Grand Prix
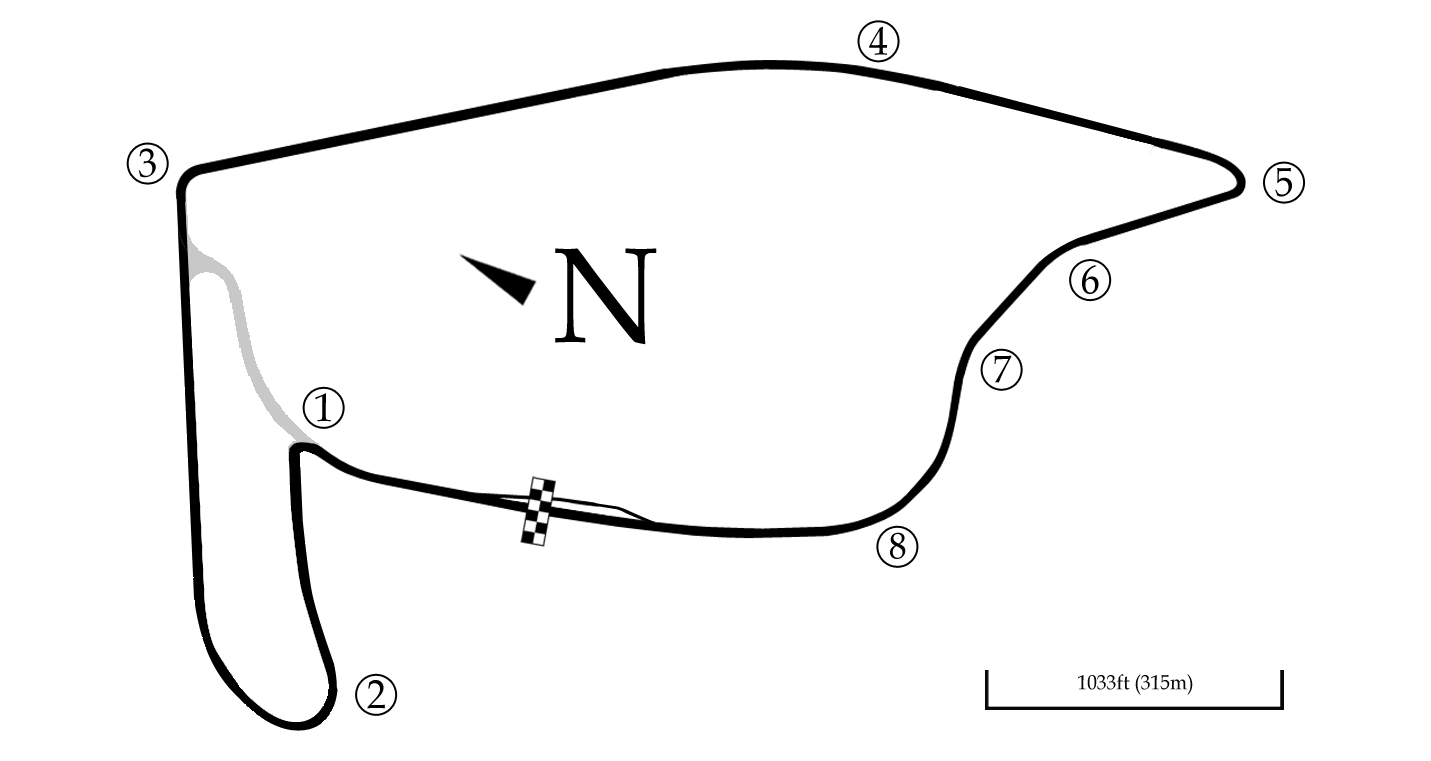

Race details
- Date: 5 January 1963
- Location: Pukekohe Park Raceway, Auckland, New Zealand
- Course: Permanent racing facility
- Course length: 2.82 km (1.76 miles)
- Distance: 75 laps, 211.5 km (132 miles)
- Weather: Sunny

Pole position
Driver	(New Zealand) Bruce McLaren	Cooper T62

Fastest lap
Driver	(New Zealand) Bruce McLaren	Cooper T62
- Time: 1:29.5

Podium
First	(United Kingdom) John Surtees	Lola Mk4
Second	(New Zealand) Angus Hyslop	Cooper T53
Third	(New Zealand) Jim Palmer	Cooper T55

The 1963 New Zealand Grand Prix was a motor race held at the newly-built Pukekohe Park Raceway on 5 January 1963. This was the first time the New Zealand Grand Prix had been held outside of the Ardmore Circuit since 1950.

Local hero Bruce McLaren captured pole position and, after a sluggish start, was leading the marquee event in front of an estimated 43,000-strong hometown crowd. However, after encountering car problems, world motorcycling champion and factory Ferrari driver, John Surtees, assumed the lead and would ease to victory.

== Race report ==
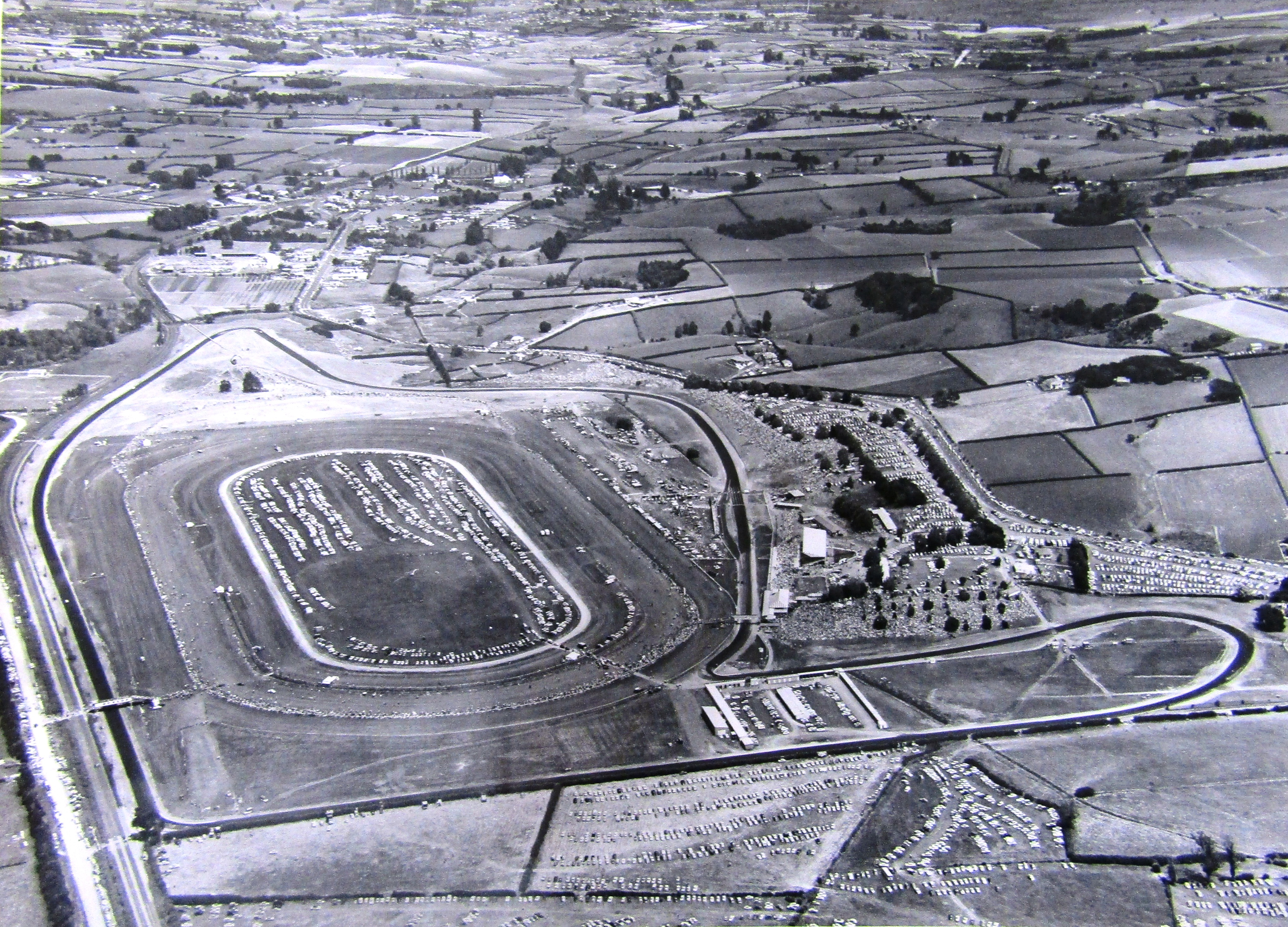
Aerial shot of Pukekohe Park during the meeting

After nine years on the Ardmore Circuit, the New Zealand Grand Prix event would move to the Pukekohe Park Raceway. The recently-opened racetrack based 35 miles south of Auckland was built at a cost of £60,000 courtesy of the NZIGP, the W. Stevenson and Sons Ltd. contracting firm, and an assortment of well-wishers who contributed roughly £20,000. After eight weeks, construction of the circuit was completed and the handover was finalised just one week before the Grand Prix was scheduled to take place.

An estimated 43,000 people would brave the sweltering heat to bear witness the debut race on the 2.21 mile circuit. Reigning Formula One World Drivers' Champion, Graham Hill, had been entered to drive in a Ferguson P99 which was deemed controversial due to its four-wheel-drive system. Three-time winner of the race, Jack Brabham, was the sole Australian entered into the race, driving in his in-house built BT4. Local hero, Bruce McLaren was touted as the favourite for the event, having just recently won the 1962 Australian Grand Prix at Caversham in Western Australia. McLaren set the pace early by way of recording the fastest lap in practice. Over a second behind him was Surtees, followed by Brabham, Tony Maggs and Hill. Aside from air travel connection issues coming from South Africa that almost curtailed their weekend, the international drivers were all experiencing problems. Hill was dissatisfied with the performance of his brakes, Surtees was encountering head gasket issues and the transmission on Maggs' car was less than optimal. Owing to the short nature of practice, most of these issues remained heading into the race.

Starting on pole, McLaren made an uncharacteristically sloppy start and lost position to Surtees. Hill had moved up to fourth place by lap four but his clutch was failing to engage and his gearbox was beginning to falter. Maggs likewise was experiencing similar issues and was ultimately forced to retire on lap three with a seized engine. Brabham would retired a few laps later with a head gasket issue. Meanwhile, up the front, the battle between McLaren and Surtees was raging with the former surging past the Briton to retake the lead, to the adulation of the crowd. However, McLaren's engine would begin to develop a misfire and was forced to pit for ignition repairs as the speed of his Cooper had dropped critically. After rejoining the race in third place, he managed to pass Hill for second. But he was soon back into the pits where the source of the engine ailments were deemed to be with the magneto. Additionally, one of the fuel tanks had cracked and was leaking. The decision was made to retire from the race. Elsewhere in the field, Chris Amon, who had an impressive showing thus far, had also begun to develop a misfire. On lap 18, he pitted for ignition repairs and lost dozens of laps.

From that point, Surtees was never challenged. He managed his pace until the end, lapping all bar one driver to win the race. Hill meanwhile endured the bitter disappointment of retiring from second place on the very last lap. This handed second place to local driver, Angus Hyslop, who was the sole unlapped driver in the field while 21-year-old Jim Palmer would round out the podium.

== Classification ==
Pos	No.	Driver	Car	Laps	Time	Grid
1	2	(United Kingdom) John Surtees	Lola Mk4 / Climax 2750cc 4cyl	75	1hr 54min 32.7sec	2
2		(New Zealand) Angus Hyslop	Cooper T53 / Climax 2495cc 4cyl	75	+ 1:23.6	8
3		(New Zealand) Jim Palmer	Cooper T55 / Climax 2750cc 4cyl	74	+ 1 lap	9
4		(New Zealand) John Histed	Lola Mk2 / Ford 1340cc 4cyl	65	+ 10 laps	13
5		(New Zealand) Rex Flowers	Gemini Mk Illa FJ / Ford 1340cc 4cyl	50	+ 25 laps	14
6		(New Zealand) Bill Thomasen	Cooper T51 / Climax 1964cc 4cyl	46	+ 29 laps	10
7	29	(New Zealand) Chris Amon	Cooper T53 / Climax 2495cc 4cyl	44	+ 31 laps	6
Ret	1	(United Kingdom) Graham Hill	Ferguson P99 / Climax 2495cc 4cyl	74	Gearbox	5
Ret	17	(New Zealand) Tony Shelly	Lotus 18/21 / Climax 2750cc 4cyl	62	Bearings	7
Ret		(New Zealand) Lionel Bulcraig	Aston Martin DBR1 / Aston 2996cc 6cyl	40	Retired	12
Ret		(New Zealand) Barry Cottle	Lola Mk1 / Climax 1220cc 4cyl	34	Retired	15
Ret	47	(New Zealand) Bruce McLaren	Cooper T62 / Climax 2750cc 4cyl	23	Magneto	1
Ret		(New Zealand) Ian Green	Cooper T45 / Climax 1964cc 4cyl	22	Retired	17
Ret		(New Zealand) Forrest Cardon	Lycoming Special / Lycoming 5239cc 4cyl	20	Ignition	16
Ret		(Australia) Jack Brabham	Brabham BT4 / Climax 2750cc 4cyl	12	Head gasket	3
Ret		(New Zealand) David Young	Cooper T65 / Ford 1473cc 4cyl	6	Ignition	11
Ret		(South Africa) Tony Maggs	Lola Mk4 / Climax 2750cc 4cyl	3	Engine	4
DNS		(New Zealand) Ken Sager	Lotus 20 / Ford 1475cc 4cyl		Did not start	
DNQ		(New Zealand) Frank Turpie	Lotus 20 / Ford 1475cc 4cyl		Did not qualify	
DNQ		(New Zealand) Bob Smith	Ferrari Super Squalo 555 / Ferrari 3431cc 4cyl		Did not qualify	
DNQ		(New Zealand) Rod Coppins	Tec Mec 1 / Chevrolet 4600cc V8		Did not qualify	
DNA		(New Zealand) Roly Levis	Cooper T52 / Ford 1475cc 4cyl		Did Not Attend	
DNA		(New Zealand) Bob Eade	Maserati 250F / Maserati 2497cc 6cyl		Did Not Attend	
DNA		(New Zealand) Brian Prescott	Maserati 250F / Maserati 2497cc 6cyl		Did Not Attend	
DNA		(New Zealand) Ian Young	Maserati 250F / Maserati 2497cc 6cyl		Did Not Attend	
DNA		(Australia) Arnold Glass	BRM P48 / Buick 3917cc V8		Did Not Attend	

Sporting positions
Preceded by 1962 New Zealand Grand Prix	New Zealand Grand Prix; 1963	Succeeded by 1964 New Zealand Grand Prix
