= 1961 New Zealand Grand Prix =

- New Zealand Grand Prix
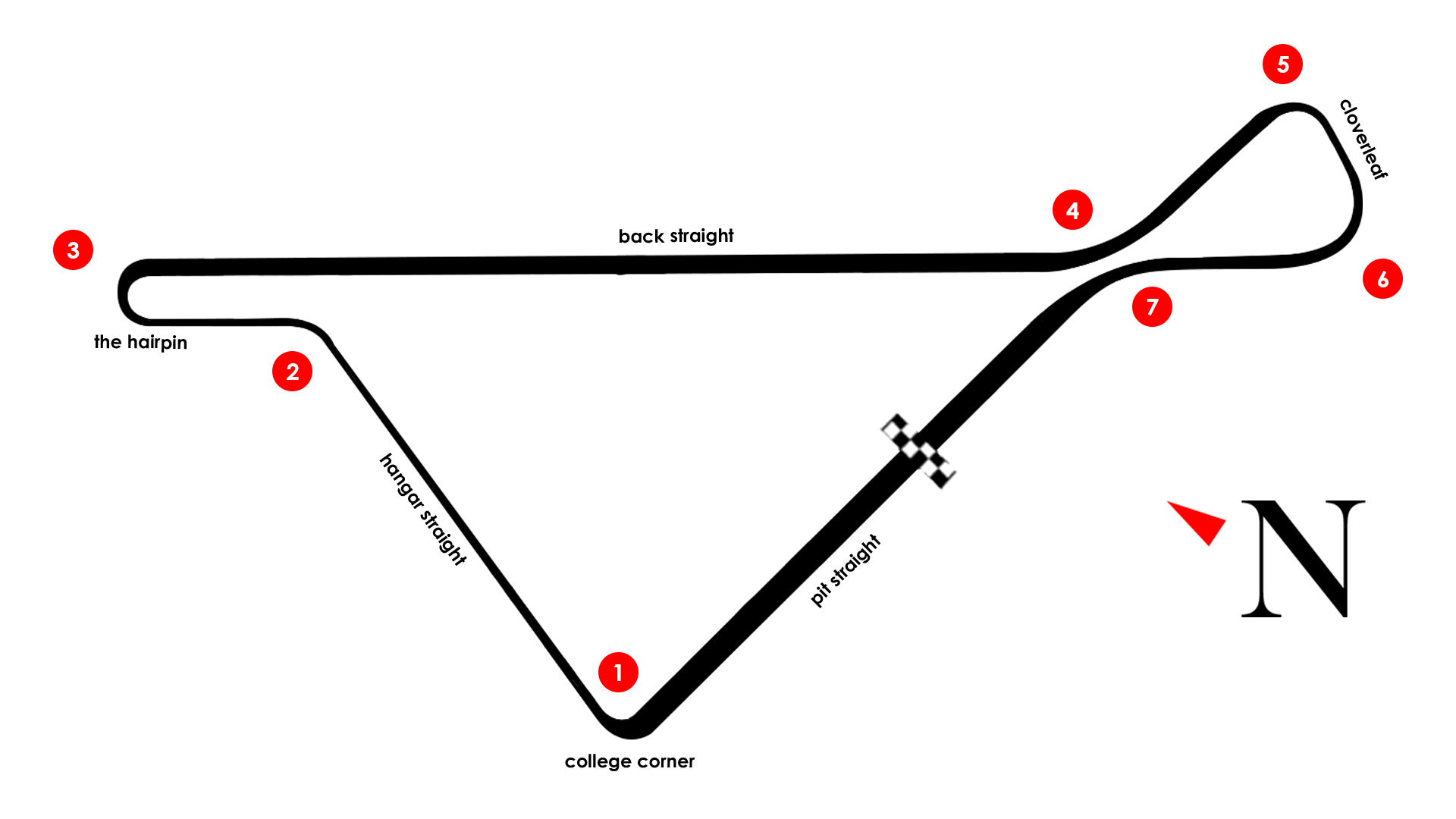

Race details
- Date: 7 January 1961
- Location: Ardmore Circuit, Auckland, New Zealand
- Course: Temporary racing facility
- Course length: 3.2 km (2.0 miles)
- Distance: 75 laps, 240 km (150 miles)
- Weather: Sunny

Pole position
Driver	(United Kingdom) Stirling Moss	Lotus 18

Fastest lap
Driver	(United Kingdom) Stirling Moss	Lotus 18
- Time: 1:21.2

Podium
First	(Australia) Jack Brabham	Cooper T53
Second	(New Zealand) Bruce McLaren	Cooper T53
Third	(United Kingdom) Graham Hill	BRM P48

The 1961 New Zealand Grand Prix was a motor race held at the Ardmore Circuit on 7 January 1961.

== Classification ==
Pos	No.	Driver	Car	Laps	Time	Grid
1	4	(Australia) Jack Brabham	Cooper T53 / Climax 2495cc 4cyl	75	1hr 42min 30.0sec	3
2	47	(New Zealand) Bruce McLaren	Cooper T53 / Climax 2495cc 4cyl	75	+ 1.7 s	2
3	8	(United Kingdom) Graham Hill	BRM P48 / BRM 2491cc 4cyl	74	+ 1 Lap	4
4	3	(United Kingdom) Ron Flockhart	Cooper T51 / Climax 2495cc 4cyl	73	+ 2 Laps	5
5	20	(New Zealand) Denny Hulme	Cooper T51 / Climax 2495cc 4cyl	73	+ 2 Laps	10
6		(United Kingdom) Jim Clark	Lotus 18 / Climax 2495cc 4cyl	71	+ 4 Laps	11
7		(New Zealand) Pat Hoare	Ferrari 256 / Ferrari 2953cc V12	70	+ 5 Laps	14
8		(Australia) Arnold Glass	Cooper T45 / Maserati 2489cc 6cyl	70	+ 5 Laps	15
9		(New Zealand) Malcolm Gill	Lycoming Special / Lycoming 5239cc 4cyl	69	+ 6 Laps	19
10		(New Zealand) Angus Hyslop	Cooper T45 / Climax 1964cc 4cyl	67	+ 8 Laps	16
11		(New Zealand) Frank Shuter	Ferrari 625 / Ferrari 2994cc 4cyl	67	+ 8 Laps	23
12		(Australia) Bib Stillwell	Aston Martin DBR4-300 / Aston 2991cc 6cyl	66	+ 9 Laps	12
13		(New Zealand) David Evans	Cooper T43 / Climax 1964cc 4cyl	52	+ 23 Laps	21
14		(New Zealand) Lionel Bulcraig	Cooper T43 / Climax 1700cc 4cyl	45	+ 30 Laps	22
Ret		(Australia) David McKay	Maserati 250F / Maserati 2497cc 6cyl	45	Exhaust	20
Ret		(New Zealand) Johnny Mansel	Maserati 250F / Maserati 2497cc 6cyl	45	Engine	17
Ret		(United States) Dan Gurney	BRM P48 / BRM 2491cc 4cyl	42	Retired	9
Ret		(United Kingdom) Roy Salvadori	Lotus 18 / Climax 2495cc 4cyl	36	Gearbox	7
Ret	7	(United Kingdom) Stirling Moss	Lotus 18 / Climax 2495cc 4cyl	32	Clutch	1
Ret		(Australia) Stan Jones	Cooper T51 / Climax 2205cc 4cyl	20	Oil Pressure	13
Ret		(United Kingdom) John Surtees	Lotus 18 / Climax 2495cc 4cyl	17	Transmission	8
Ret		(United Kingdom) Innes Ireland	Lotus 18 / Climax 2495cc 4cyl	16	Crown Wheel	6
Ret		(New Zealand) Len Gilbert	Maserati 250F / Maserati 2497cc 6cyl	9	Engine	18
Ret	25	(Sweden) Jo Bonnier	Cooper T51 / Climax 2495cc 4cyl	0	Gearbox	24
DNQ		(New Zealand) Tony Shelly	Cooper T45 / Climax 1964cc 4cyl		Did not qualify	
DNQ		(New Zealand) Brian Prescott	Maserati 250F / Maserati 2497cc 6cyl		Did not qualify	
DNQ		(New Zealand) Bob Smith	Ferrari Super Squalo 555 / Ferrari 3431cc 4cyl		Did not qualify	
DNQ		(New Zealand) Allan Freeman	Talbot-Lago T26C / Talbot 4485cc 6cyl		Did not qualify	
DNQ		(New Zealand) Jim Boyd	HWM / Alta 1971cc 4cyl s/c		Did not qualify	
DNQ		(New Zealand) Peter Elford	Cooper-Bristol Mk I / Bristol 1971cc 6cyl		Did not qualify	
DNQ		(New Zealand) Roly Levis	Cooper T52 FJ / BMC 994cc 4cyl		Did not qualify	
DNQ		(New Zealand) Jim Palmer	Lotus 18 FJ / Ford 994cc 4cyl		Did not qualify	
DNQ		(Australia) Doug Whiteford	Maserati 250F / Maserati 2497cc 6cyl		Did not qualify	
DNQ		(New Zealand) Bill Thomasen	Ferrari 750 Monza / Ferrari 2999cc 4cyl		Did not qualify	
DNQ		(New Zealand) Bill Gardiner	Tojeiro 3/56 / Jaguar 3800cc 6cyl		Did not qualify	
DNQ		(New Zealand) Arthur Moffatt	Lotus 15 / Climax 1964cc 4cyl		Did not qualify	
DNQ		(New Zealand) Duncan Mackenzie	Cooper T41 / Climax 1460cc 4cyl		Did not qualify	
DNQ		(New Zealand) Bob Eade	Maserati 250F / Maserati 2497cc 6cyl		Did not qualify	
DNA		(New Zealand) Jack Malcolm	Cooper-Bristol Mk II / Holden 2358cc 6cyl		Did Not Attend	

Sporting positions
Preceded by 1960 New Zealand Grand Prix	New Zealand Grand Prix; 1961	Succeeded by 1962 New Zealand Grand Prix
