= 1957 New Zealand Grand Prix =

- 5th New Zealand Grand Prix
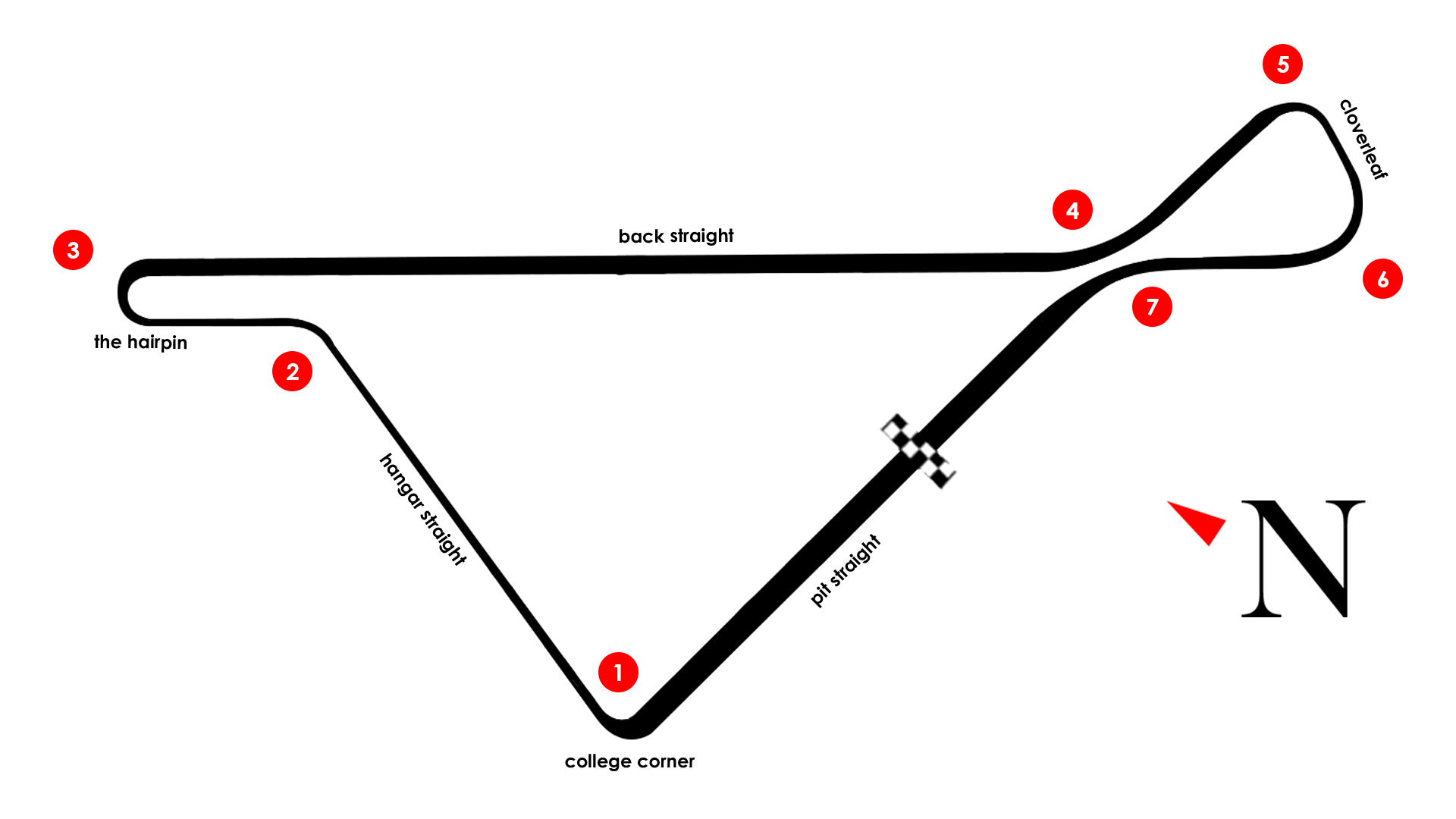

Race details
- Date: 13 January 1957
- Location: Ardmore Circuit, Auckland, New Zealand
- Course: Temporary racing facility
- Course length: 3.2 km (2.0 miles)
- Distance: 120 laps, 384 km (240 miles)
- Weather: Sunny

Pole position
Driver	(New Zealand) Ron Roycroft	Ferrari 375
- Time: Determined by heats

Fastest lap
Driver	(United Kingdom) Reg Parnell	Ferrari 555/860
- Time: 1:31.2

Podium
First	(United Kingdom) Reg Parnell	Ferrari 555/860
Second	(United Kingdom) Peter Whitehead	Ferrari 555/860
Third	(Australia) Stan Jones	Maserati 250F

The 1957 New Zealand Grand Prix was a motor race held at the Ardmore Circuit on 13 January 1957. The event was won by Briton Reg Parnell driving the Ferrari 555/860 to victory over fellow Briton Peter Whitehead and former New Zealand Grand Prix winner, Stan Jones.

The event was perhaps best known for the death of British driver Ken Wharton. Whilst attempting to overtake a lapped car, Wharton lost control of his car and struck straw bales outlining the base of the pylon carrying an overhead banner over the circuit. After somersaulting several times, where Wharton was thrown out onto the circuit, he was left unconscious with severe head injuries of which he would later succumb to.

== Classification ==
Pos	No.	Driver	Car	Laps	Time	Grid
1	4	(United Kingdom) Reg Parnell	Ferrari 555/860 / Ferrari 3431cc 4cyl	120	3hr 07min 56.1sec	3
2	5	(United Kingdom) Peter Whitehead	Ferrari 555/860 / Ferrari 3431cc 4cyl	120		2
3	6	(Australia) Stan Jones	Maserati 250F / Maserati 2497cc 6cyl	119	+ 1 lap	2
4	18	(New Zealand) Ross Jensen	Ferrari 750 Monza / Ferrari 2999cc 4cyl	118	+ 2 laps	5
5	28	(New Zealand) Bob Gibbons	Jaguar D-Type / Jaguar 3442cc 6cyl			16
6		(New Zealand) George Palmer	Cooper T23 / Bristol 1971cc 6cyl			11
7	62	(New Zealand) Ralph Watson	Lycoming Special / Lycoming 4733cc 4cyl			17
8		(New Zealand) Ron Frost	Cooper Mk IX / Norton 515cc 1cyl			20
9	8	(New Zealand) Tom Clark	HWM / Alta 1960cc 4cyl s/c			4
10	3	(Australia) Jack Brabham	Cooper T41 / Climax 1460cc 4cyl			8
11	27	(New Zealand) Peter Gendell	Bugatti Type 35A / Jaguar 3442cc 6cyl			19
12	31	(New Zealand) Alex Stringer	Cooper T41 / Climax 1098cc 4cyl			13
13	23	(New Zealand) Ronnie Moore	Cooper T39 / Climax 1098cc 4cyl			21
14	10	(New Zealand) John McMillan	Alfa Romeo Tipo B / Alfa 2905cc 8cyl s/c			22
Ret		(New Zealand) Arnold Stafford	Cooper Mk IX / Norton 515cc 1cyl	103	Oil Pressure	23
Ret		(New Zealand) Syd Jensen	Cooper T41 / Climax 1460cc 4cyl	99	Engine	9
Ret	11	(New Zealand) Allan Freeman	Talbot-Lago T26C / Talbot 4485cc 6cyl	81	Magneto	18
Ret	19	(New Zealand) Ron Roycroft	Ferrari 375 / Ferrari 4493cc V12	63	Driver Exhaustion	1
Ret	36	(New Zealand) Pat Hoare	Maserati 4CLT-48 / Maserati 1498cc 4cyl s/c	55	Retired	12
Ret	7	(Australia) Bib Stillwell	Maserati 250F / Maserati 2497cc 6cyl	50	Gearbox	10
Ret	35	(New Zealand) Roly Crowther	Lotus Eleven / Climax 1098cc 4cyl	32	Differential	14
Ret	2	(United Kingdom) Horace Gould	Maserati 250F / Maserati 2497cc 6cyl	15	Valve	6
Ret	12	(New Zealand) Dave Caldwell	Alfa Romeo Tipo B / Alfa 2905cc 8cyl s/c	10	Valve	15
Ret		(United Kingdom) Bill Morice	Cooper T20 / Bristol 1971cc 6cyl	9	Engine	24
DNS	1	(United Kingdom) Ken Wharton	Maserati 250F / Maserati 2497cc 6cyl		Fatal Accident	
DNS		(New Zealand) Gavin Quirk	Cooper T20 / Bristol 1971cc 6cyl		Did not start	
DNQ		(New Zealand) Frank Shuter	Maserati 8CM / Maserati 2992cc 8cyl s/c		Did not qualify	
DNQ		(New Zealand) Phil Neill	Maserati 6CM / Maserati 1493cc 6cyl s/c		Did not qualify	
DNQ		(New Zealand) Ted Thompson	Bugatti Type 38 / Ford 4071cc V8		Did not qualify	
DNQ		(New Zealand) Rob Hugill	Cooper Mk VIII / JAP 497cc 1cyl		Did not qualify	
DNQ		(New Zealand) Bruce Webster	Cooper Mk VII / JAP 497cc 1cyl		Did not qualify	
DNQ		(New Zealand) Len Gilbert	Cooper Mk VI / Norton 498cc 1cyl		Did not qualify	
DNQ		(New Zealand) Les Moore	Cooper Mk V / Vincent 998cc V2		Did not qualify	
DNQ		(New Zealand) Wally Henwood	Cooper Mk IV / Vincent 998cc V2		Did not qualify	
DNQ		(New Zealand) Jim Boyd	Buckler DD1 / Climax 1098cc 4cyl		Did not qualify	
DNQ		(New Zealand) Ted Avery	HWM / Cadillac 5420cc V8		Did not qualify	
DNA		(Australia) Norman Hamilton	Porsche Spyder 550 / Porsche 1498cc 4cyl		Did Not Attend	
DNA		(New Zealand) Bill Culver	DeSoto Special / DeSoto 3368cc 6cyl		Did Not Attend	
DNA		(Australia) Alex Mackay	Cooper T39 / Climax 1098cc 4cyl		Did Not Attend	
DNA		(New Zealand) Reg McCutcheon	Normac Special / Chevrolet 3870cc 6cyl		Did Not Attend	
DNA		(Australia) Paul England	Ausca / Holden 2350cc 6cyl		Did Not Attend	
DNA		(New Zealand) Johnny Mansel	Ardun Special / Mercury 4500cc V8		Did Not Attend	
DNA		(New Zealand) Bruce McLaren	Austin-Healey 100/4 / Austin 2660cc 4cyl		Did Not Attend	

Sporting positions
Preceded by 1956 New Zealand Grand Prix	New Zealand Grand Prix; 1957	Succeeded by 1958 New Zealand Grand Prix
