= 1958 New Zealand Grand Prix =

- 6th New Zealand Grand Prix
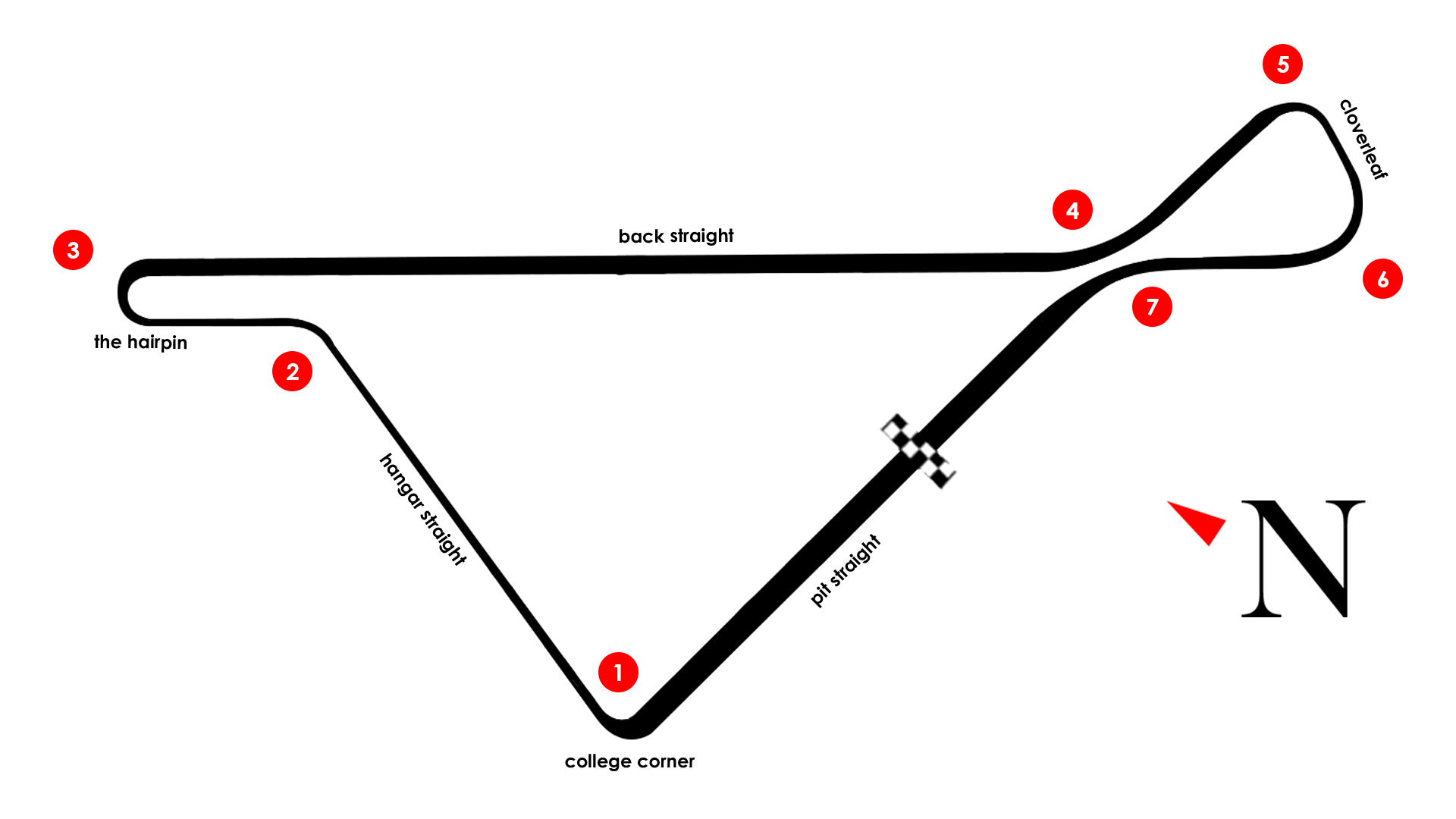

Race details
- Date: 11 January 1958
- Location: Ardmore Circuit, Auckland, New Zealand
- Course: Temporary racing facility
- Course length: 3.2 km (2.0 miles)
- Distance: 75 laps, 240 km (150 miles)
- Weather: Sunny

Pole position
Driver	(Australia) Jack Brabham	Cooper T43
- Time: Determined by heats

Fastest lap
Driver	(Australia) Jack Brabham	Cooper T43
- Time: 1:28.0

Podium
First	(Australia) Jack Brabham	Cooper T43
Second	(New Zealand) Ross Jensen	Maserati 250F
Third	(New Zealand) Ron Roycroft	Ferrari 375

The 1958 New Zealand Grand Prix was a motor race held at the Ardmore Circuit on 11 January 1958. Jack Brabham would take a comfortable victory ahead of Ross Jensen and Ron Roycroft. This made Brabham the first Australian to win the New Zealand Grand Prix, and the first of three occasions on which he would win the event.

Local hero Bruce McLaren encountered gearbox troubles before the race had even begun, joining the race half a minute behind the pack. Despite the efforts put forth by his mechanics to make this happen, he would retire four laps from the end, with the gearbox issues still plaguing his car.

== Classification ==
Pos	No.	Driver	Car	Laps	Time	Grid
1	4	(Australia) Jack Brabham	Cooper T43 / Climax 2249cc 4cyl	75	1hr 53min 24.3sec	1
2	18	(New Zealand) Ross Jensen	Maserati 250F / Maserati 2497cc 6cyl	75	+ 3.9	3
3	19	(New Zealand) Ron Roycroft	Ferrari 375 / Ferrari 4493cc V12	75	+ 20.3	8
4	23	(New Zealand) Pat Hoare	Ferrari 625 / Ferrari 2996cc 4cyl	75	+ 1:16.4	11
5	2	(United Kingdom) Roy Salvadori	Connaught B / Alta 2470cc 4cyl	75	+ 1:18.3	2
6	37	(United Kingdom) Dick Gibson	Cooper T43 / Climax 1496cc 4cyl	75	+ 1:32.1	10
7	15	(New Zealand) Ron Frost	Cooper T41 / Climax 1498cc 4cyl	74	+ 1 lap	16
8	7	(Australia) Bib Stillwell	Maserati 250F / Maserati 2497cc 6cyl	74	+ 1 lap	22
9	27	(New Zealand) Johnny Mansel	Alfa Romeo Tipo B / Alfa 2905cc 8cyl s/c	74	+ 1 lap	14
10	36	(New Zealand) Ralph Watson	Lycoming Special / Lycoming 4733cc 4cyl	73	+ 2 laps	18
11	34	(New Zealand) Gavin Quirk	Maserati 250F / Maserati 2497cc 6cyl	73	+ 2 laps	21
12	10	(Australia) Arnold Glass	Ferrari Super Squalo 555 / Ferrari 3431cc 4cyl	73	+ 2 laps	9
13	31	(New Zealand) Frank Shuter	Maserati 8CLT-50 / Maserati 2984cc 8cyl s/c	73	+ 2 laps	15
14	6	(New Zealand) Frank Cantwell	Tojeiro 3/56 / Jaguar 3442cc 6cyl	73	+ 2 laps	13
15	11	(New Zealand) Allan Freeman	Talbot-Lago T26C / Talbot 4485cc 6cyl	73	+ 2 laps	19
Ret	1	(United Kingdom) Archie Scott-Brown	Lister 57/1 / Jaguar 3781cc 6cyl	72	Suspension	7
Ret	47	(New Zealand) Bruce McLaren	Cooper T43 / Climax 1750cc 4cyl	71	Gearbox	4
Ret	32	(New Zealand) Ernie Sprague	Maserati 4CLT-48 / Maserati 1498cc 4cyl s/c	71	Engine	17
Ret	3	(United Kingdom) Stuart Lewis-Evans	Maserati 250F / Maserati 2497cc 6cyl	63	Oil Pressure	6
Ret	26	(New Zealand) Bob Gibbons	Jaguar D-Type / Jaguar 3442cc 6cyl	44	Oil Pressure	12
Ret	5	(Australia) Lex Davison	Ferrari 500 / Ferrari 2996cc 4cyl	40	Piston	5
Ret	29	(New Zealand) Ken Harris	Ferrari 750 Monza / Ferrari 2999cc 4cyl	25	Fuel Line	23
DNS	30	(New Zealand) Jim Boyd	Cooper-Bristol Mk I / Bristol 1971cc 6cyl		Did not start	24
DNS	8	(New Zealand) Graham Pierce	Austin-Healey 100S / Austin 2660cc 5cyl		Did not start	20
DNS	21	(New Zealand) Ron Duncan	Connaught A / Lea Francis 1964cc 4cyl s/c		Did not start	
DNQ	12	(New Zealand) Roly Crowther	Lotus Eleven / Climax 1098cc 4cyl		Did not qualify	
DNQ	16	(New Zealand) Wally Henwood	Cooper Mk IV / Vincent 998cc V2		Did not qualify	
DNQ	24	(New Zealand) Rob Hugill	Cooper Mk VIII / JAP 1098cc V2		Did not qualify	
DNQ	25	(New Zealand) Ron Learnan	RGR / Norton 498cc 1cyl		Did not qualify	
DNQ	35	(New Zealand) Reg McCutcheon	Normac Special / Chevrolet 3870cc 6cyl		Did not qualify	
DNQ	14	(New Zealand) Merv Neil	Cooper T39 / Climax 1498cc 4cyl		Did not qualify	
DNQ	9	(New Zealand) George Palmer	Cooper-Bristol Mk II / Bristol 1971cc 6cyl		Did not qualify	
DNQ	20	(New Zealand) Lionel Bulcraig	Northland Special / Mercury 4005cc V8		Did not qualify	
DNA	22	(New Zealand) Tom Clark	Ferrari Super Squalo 555 / Ferrari 3431cc 4cyl		Did Not Attend	
DNA	28	(New Zealand) Jack Malcolm	Cooper-Bristol Mk II / Bristol 1971cc 6cyl		Did Not Attend	
DNA	33	(Hungary) János Buza	HWM / Alta 1960cc 4cyl s/c		Did Not Attend	

Sporting positions
Preceded by 1957 New Zealand Grand Prix	New Zealand Grand Prix; 1958	Succeeded by 1959 New Zealand Grand Prix
