= 1956 New Zealand Grand Prix =

- 4th New Zealand Grand Prix
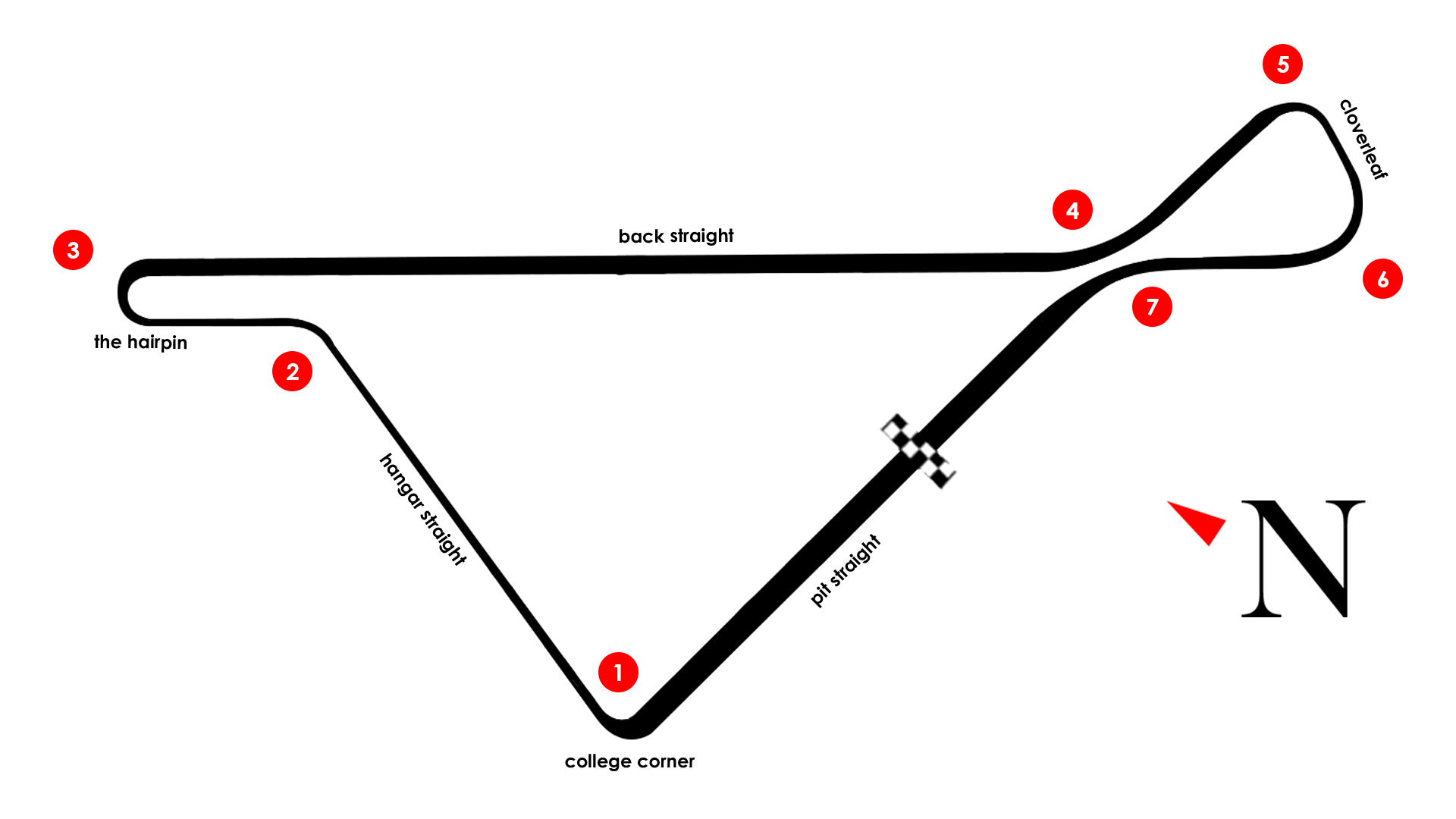

Race details
- Date: 7 January 1956
- Location: Ardmore Circuit, Auckland, New Zealand
- Course: Temporary racing facility
- Course length: 3.2 km (2.0 miles)
- Distance: 100 laps, 338 km (186 miles)
- Weather: Sunny

Pole position
Driver	(United Kingdom) Stirling Moss	Maserati 250F
- Time: 1:29.0

Fastest lap
Driver	(United Kingdom) Stirling Moss	Maserati 250F
- Time: 1:28.0

Podium
First	(United Kingdom) Stirling Moss	Maserati 250F
Second	(Australia) Tony Gaze	Ferrari 500/750S
Third	(United Kingdom) Peter Whitehead	Ferrari 500/750S

The 1956 New Zealand Grand Prix was a motor race held at the Ardmore Circuit on 7 January 1956. This was the fourth running of the marquee event and was run to Formula Libre regulations.

Stirling Moss entered the weekend as the favourite and would deliver with a commanding victory, with the fastest lap to boot. Tony Gaze and Peter Whitehead completed the podium for the second year running.

== Race report ==
Stirling Moss was heavily favoured for victory heading into the weekend. He would be driving a Maserati 250S fitted with Dunlop alloy wheels and the latest state-of-the-art Dunlop disc brakes in place of the large Maserati drums. However, there were some other names of interest in the entry list. Both Tony Gaze and Peter Whitehead came armed with a pair of Ferrari 500's that had been tuned to run on methanol, providing them with a notable power advantage compared to the previous years cars. As well as this, the 625 motors had been replaced with 750S's. Reg Parnell had also initially entered the race with an Aston Martin 2.5-litre single seater. However, the engine blew during testing and was consigned to race a Cooper T38 instead. The last of the British contingent was Leslie Marr who entered a Connaught B Type with a Jaguar D-Type engine.

A shipping debacle that saw cars being sent to Wellington instead of Auckland almost curtailed the weekend for multiple drivers including Moss. This, coupled with the cars being loaded well down into the ship and the wild weather that delayed unloading, meant that the cars had to be flown up to Auckland at late notice and the cars would have to be assembled and run without adequate practice. Spare parts for all cars had also gone missing although most were recovered in time for the race. During practice itself, Moss set the pace - and by a significant margin too. Before the race start, a young Jack Brabham's gearbox failed and was forced to withdraw from the race.

Gaze initially lead the race off the starting line, but would be passed soon after by Moss, who thereafter enjoyed a largely trouble-free race to the flag. However, at around half-race distance, Moss began to feel what he thought was raindrops on his visor. Instead, it was petrol courtesy of a broken fuel lead which was spraying fuel back into the cockpit. He slowed speed considerably and eventually made a pitstop for repairs just eight laps from home. Despite this, the lead was such that the Ferrari's of Gaze and Whitehead could not hope to challenge for a potential victory.

== Classification ==
Pos	No.	Driver	Car	Laps	Time	Grid
1	7	(United Kingdom) Stirling Moss	Maserati 250F / Maserati 2497cc 6cyl	100	2hr 32min 23.1sec	1
2	4	(Australia) Tony Gaze	Ferrari 500/750S / Ferrari 2968cc 4cyl	100	+ 43.6	3
3	3	(United Kingdom) Peter Whitehead	Ferrari 500/750S / Ferrari 2968cc 4cyl	99	+ 1 lap	2
4	2	(United Kingdom) Leslie Marr	Connaught B Type / Jaguar 3442cc 6cyl	99	+ 1 lap	20
5	6	(United Kingdom) Reg Parnell	Cooper T38 / Jaguar 3442cc 6cyl	98	+ 2 laps	6
6	19	(New Zealand) Ron Roycroft	Bugatti Type 35A / Jaguar 3442cc 6cyl			5
7		(New Zealand) Syd Jensen	Cooper Mk IX / Norton 530cc 1cyl			7
8	22	(New Zealand) Tom Clark	Maserati 8CM / Maserati 2992cc 8cyl s/c			8
9	10	(Australia) Frank Kleinig	Porsche Spyder 550 / Porsche 1498cc 4cyl			11
10		(New Zealand) Reg McCutcheon	Normac Special / Chevrolet 3870cc 6cyl			14
11		(New Zealand) Frank Shuter	Cadillac Special / Cadillac 5200cc V8			22
12	12	(New Zealand) Fred Zambucka	Maserati 8CLT-50 / Maserati 2984cc 8cyl s/c			9
13		(New Zealand) Arnold Stafford	Cooper Mk IX / Norton 530cc 1cyl			16
14		(New Zealand) John McMillan	Alfa Romeo Tipo B / Alfa 2905cc 8cyl s/c			18
15		(New Zealand) Des McDonagh	Thomas-Mercury / Mercury 4100cc V8			19
Ret		(New Zealand) Rob Hugill	Cooper Mk VIII / Norton 498cc 1cyl		Retired	25
Ret	15	(New Zealand) Ron Frost	Cooper Mk IX / Norton 530cc 1cyl		Retired	12
Ret	39	(Australia) David McKay	Aston Martin DB3S / Aston 2996cc 6cyl		Retired	10
Ret		(Australia) Tom Sulman	Aston Martin DB3S / Aston 2996cc 6cyl		Retired	15
Ret		(New Zealand) Morrie Stanton	Stanton Special / de Havilland 6124cc 4cyl		Retired	13
Ret	20	(New Zealand) Ross Jensen	Austin-Healey 100S / Austin 2660cc 4cyl	15	Crankshaft	17
Ret		(New Zealand) Fred Crowther	Alfa Romeo Tipo B / Alfa 2905cc 8cyl s/c	7	Retired	24
Ret		(New Zealand) Lionel Bulcraig	Northland Special / Mercury 4100cc V8	5	Engine	23
Ret		(Australia) Alec Mildren	Cooper T23 / Bristol 1971cc 6cyl	0	Head Gasket	21
DNS		(Australia) Jack Brabham	Cooper T40 / Bristol 1971cc 6cyl	0	Gearbox	4
DNQ		(New Zealand) George Smith	GeeCeeEss / Mercury 4071cc V8		Did Not Qualify	
DNQ		(New Zealand) Roly Crowther	Maserati 6CM / Maserati 1493cc 6cyl s/c		Did Not Qualify	
DNQ		(New Zealand) Harley Beckett	Maserati 8CLT-50 / Maserati 2984cc 8cyl s/c		Did Not Qualify	
DNQ		(New Zealand) Allan Freeman	Talbot-Lago T26C / Talbot 4485cc 6cyl		Did Not Qualify	
DNQ		(New Zealand) Len Gilbert	Cooper Mk VI / Norton 498cc 1cyl		Did Not Qualify	
DNQ		(New Zealand) Gordon Brown	Buckler Mk VI / Ford 1172cc 4cyl s/c		Did Not Qualify	
DNQ		(New Zealand) Ronnie Moore	Cooper Mk V / Vincent 998c V2		Did Not Qualify	
DNQ		(New Zealand) Les Moore	Kieft C50 / Vincent 998cc V2 s/c		Did Not Qualify	
DNQ		(New Zealand) Snow Petersen	Cooper Mk IV / JAP 497cc 1cyl		Did Not Qualify	
DNQ		(New Zealand) Bruce Wood	Staride 52 / JAP 497cc 1cyl		Did Not Qualify	
DNQ		(New Zealand) Terry Nixon	Cooper Mk VIII / Norton 498cc 1cyl		Did Not Qualify	
DNQ	36	(New Zealand) Ted Bristed	Triumph TR2 / Standard 2088cc 4cyl		Did Not Qualify	
DNQ		(New Zealand) Bruce Webster	Cooper Mk VII / JAP 497cc 1cyl		Did Not Qualify	
DNQ		(New Zealand) Ray Drew	Cooper Mk IX / Norton 498cc 1cyl		Did Not Qualify	
DNA		(New Zealand) Dave Caldwell	Alfa Romeo Tipo B / Alfa 2905cc 8cyl s/c		Did Not Arrive	
DNA		(Australia) Stan Jones	Maybach Special / Maybach 4640cc 6cyl		Did Not Arrive	
DNA		(Australia) Paul England	Ausca / Holden 2350cc 6cyl		Did Not Arrive	
DNA		(New Zealand) George Palmer	Cooper T20 / Bristol 1971cc 6cyl		Did Not Arrive	
DNA	16	(New Zealand) John Seabrook	Austin-Healey 100M / Austin 2660cc 4cyl		Did Not Arrive	
DNA	17	(New Zealand) Phil Neill	Austin-Healey 100/4 / Austin 2660cc 4cyl		Did Not Arrive	
DNA	19	(New Zealand) Bruce McLaren	Austin-Healey 100/4 / Austin 2660cc 4cyl		Did Not Arrive	
DNA		(New Zealand) Ray Archibald	Jaguar XK120 / Jaguar 3442cc 6cyl		Did Not Arrive	

Sporting positions
Preceded by 1955 New Zealand Grand Prix	New Zealand Grand Prix; 1956	Succeeded by 1957 New Zealand Grand Prix
