= NZAR =

NZAR may refer to:

- NZAR, the International Civil Aviation Organization airport code for Ardmore Airport (New Zealand)
- New Zealand Administrative Reports, a standard Case citation#New Zealand in New Zealand
