= 1955 New Zealand Grand Prix =

- 3rd New Zealand Grand Prix
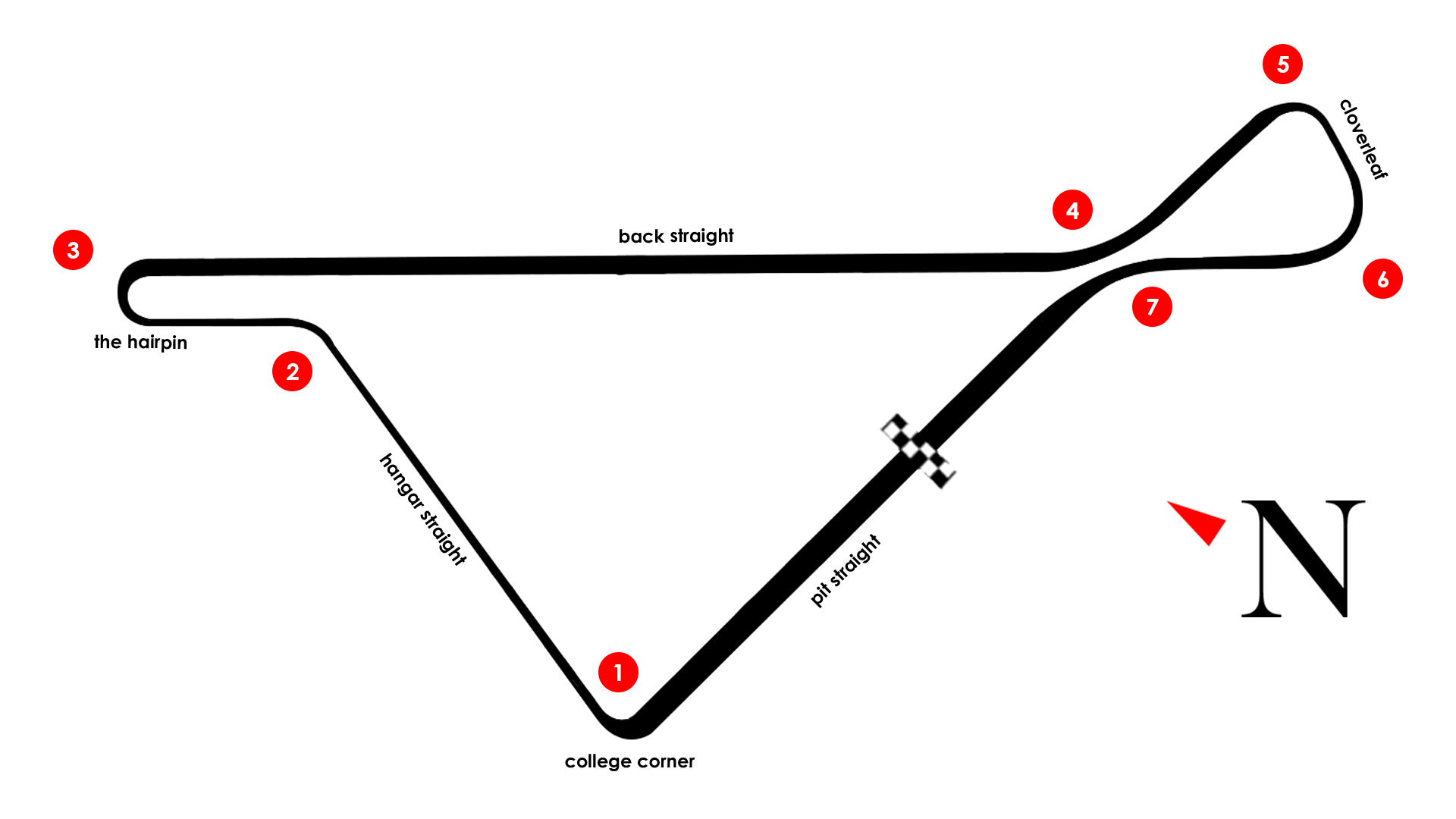

Race details
- Date: 8 January 1955
- Location: Ardmore Circuit, Auckland, New Zealand
- Course: Temporary racing facility
- Course length: 3.2 km (2.0 miles)
- Distance: 100 laps, 300 km (186 miles)
- Weather: Sunny

Pole position
Driver	Determined by heats	

Fastest lap
Driver	(Thailand) Prince Bira	Maserati 250F
- Time: 1:33.0

Podium
First	(Thailand) Prince Bira	Maserati 250F
Second	(United Kingdom) Peter Whitehead	Ferrari 500/625
Third	(Australia) Tony Gaze	Ferrari 500/625

The 1955 New Zealand Grand Prix was a motor race held at the Ardmore Circuit on 8 January 1955. It was the third iteration of the New Zealand Grand Prix and was run to Formula Libre regulations.

The event was won by Thailand's Prince Bira. Bira won in relatively dominant fashion, lapping all but two drivers – Peter Whitehead and Tony Gaze. The need for pitstops potentially cost the Ferrari pairing of Whitehead and Gaze a shot at victory. They did however complete the podium, on the lead lap. Having both set a time of 1:33.0, Bira and Whitehead had shared the fastest lap of the race.

== Race report ==
The second iteration of the New Zealand International Grand Prix saw the introduction of heats to determine the starting grid positions for the main race. The modified layout from the previous years race to mitigate the slew of cars spinning at the west end of the circuit was retained for the 1955 event. This would be the last year it would be run as, for 1956, Ardmore would revert to the original layout. It was immediately apparent that speeds had drastically increased from the previous year and Bira, with his formidable Maserati 250F and methanol blend fuel mixture, was the fastest of them all in early practice. The two qualifying heats were held mere hours before the race. The first was won by Peter Whitehead while the second was won by Bira.

At the start of the main Grand Prix, Whitehead and Tony Gaze leapt off into an early lead in their Ferraris. However, they were soon vanquished by Bira, who never looked back once he assumed the lead. Both the Ferraris repeatedly made brief calls to the pits during the race, starting from lap 22, while Bira continued to tear around, never needing to venture to the pitlane for the entirety of the race. Whitehead lost 23 seconds in the first stop whilst Gaze lost an entire lap to clear a jammed throttle linkage. Down the pack, local driver Fred Zambucka had trouble negotiating College Corner and spun into the hay bales three times during the course of the race. Australian Stan Coffey exceeded expectations by jostling among the leading pack in the early part of the race before being forced to retire due to oil pressure on lap 16.

From that point, the race was rather processional. However, the effect of Ferrari's pitstops were not immediately apparent. Bira was leading comfortably, but with a handful of laps remaining, Bira's brakes began to fade noticeably and was essentially driving on the gears. The effort required to pull the car up wore out the soles of his shoes and as Gaze scythed past to unlap himself, a late-race challenge by Ferrari might have been feasibly possible had Whitehead and Gaze not lost as much time as they did in the pits. As it was, Bira romped home to take victory, with the winning average speed over six miles an hour faster than the previous year's event. Whitehead and Gaze rounded out the top three, being the only cars other than Bira on the lead lap.

== Classification ==
Pos	No.	Driver	Car	Laps	Time
1	1	(Thailand) Prince Bira	Maserati 250F / Maserati 2497cc 6cyl	100	2hr 40min 12sec
2		(United Kingdom) Peter Whitehead	Ferrari 500/625 / Ferrari 2968cc 4cyl	100	+ 33.0 s
3	4	(Australia) Tony Gaze	Ferrari 500/625 / Ferrari 2968cc 4cyl	100	+ 1.26.0 s
4		(Australia) Jack Brabham	Cooper T23 / Bristol 1971cc 6cyl	98	+ 2 Laps
5	3	(Australia) Reg Hunt	Maserati A6GCM / Maserati 2497cc 6cyl	97	+ 3 Laps
6		(New Zealand) Syd Jensen	Cooper Mk. VII / Norton 498cc 1cyl	91	+ 9 Laps
7	12	(New Zealand) Fred Zambucka	Maserati 8CM / Maserati 2992cc 8cyl s/c	89	+ 11 Laps
8		(New Zealand) George Palmer	Jackson-Mercury / Mercury 4118cc V8	88	+ 12 Laps
9	18	(New Zealand) Ross Jensen	Triumph TR2 / Triumph 1991cc 4cyl	86	+ 14 Laps
10		(Australia) Dick Cobden	Ferrari 125 / Ferrari 1995cc V12 s/c	86	+ 14 Laps
11		(New Zealand) Arnold Stafford	Cooper Mk. VII / Norton 498cc 1cyl	85	+ 15 Laps
12		(New Zealand) Phil Neill	Austin-Healey 100 / Austin 2660cc 4cyl	83	+ 17 Laps
13		(New Zealand) Peter McInally	Austin-Healey 100 / Austin 2660cc 4cyl	80	+ 20 Laps
14		(New Zealand) Des McDonagh	Thomas-Mercury / Mercury 4100cc V8	75	+ 25 Laps
15		(New Zealand) John Horton	HWM F1 / Alta 1960cc 4cyl s/c	55	+ 45 Laps
Ret		(New Zealand) Ron Frost	Cooper Mk. VIII / Norton 498cc 1cyl	89	Gearbox
Ret		(Australia) Lex Davison	HWM F2 / Jaguar 3442cc 6cyl	88	Transmission
Ret		(New Zealand) Ron Roycroft	Alfa Romeo Tipo B / Alfa Romeo 2905cc 8cyl s/c	58	Valve
Ret		(New Zealand) John McMillan	Alfa Romeo Tipo B / Alfa Romeo 2905cc 8cyl s/c	33	Retired
Ret		(New Zealand) Bill Lee	Cooper Mk. VI / Norton 498cc 1cyl	30	Retired
Ret		(New Zealand) Les McLaren	Austin-Healey 100 / Austin 2660cc 4cyl	30	Retired
Ret		(New Zealand) Bill Culver	DeSoto Special / DeSoto 3368cc 6cyl	19	Engine
Ret	26	(New Zealand) Reg McCutcheon	Normac Special / Chevrolet 3870cc 6cyl	17	Frost Plug
Ret		(Australia) Stan Coffey	Cooper T20 / Bristol 1971cc 6cyl	16	Oil Pressure
Ret		(New Zealand) Gordon Brown	GBS / Ford 1172cc 4cyl	9	Engine
DNS		(New Zealand) George Smith	GCS / Chrysler 5600cc V8		Did Not Start
DNS		(New Zealand) Wally Bern	Triumph TR2 / Triumph 1991cc 4cyl		Did Not Start
DNS		(New Zealand) Tony Shelly	Morgan +4 / Standard 2088cc 4cyl		Did Not Start
DNS		(New Zealand) Johnny Mansel	Mansel Special / Mercury 3950cc V8		Did Not Start

Sporting positions
Preceded by 1954 New Zealand Grand Prix	New Zealand Grand Prix; 1955	Succeeded by 1956 New Zealand Grand Prix
