= 1959 New Zealand Grand Prix =

- 7th New Zealand Grand Prix
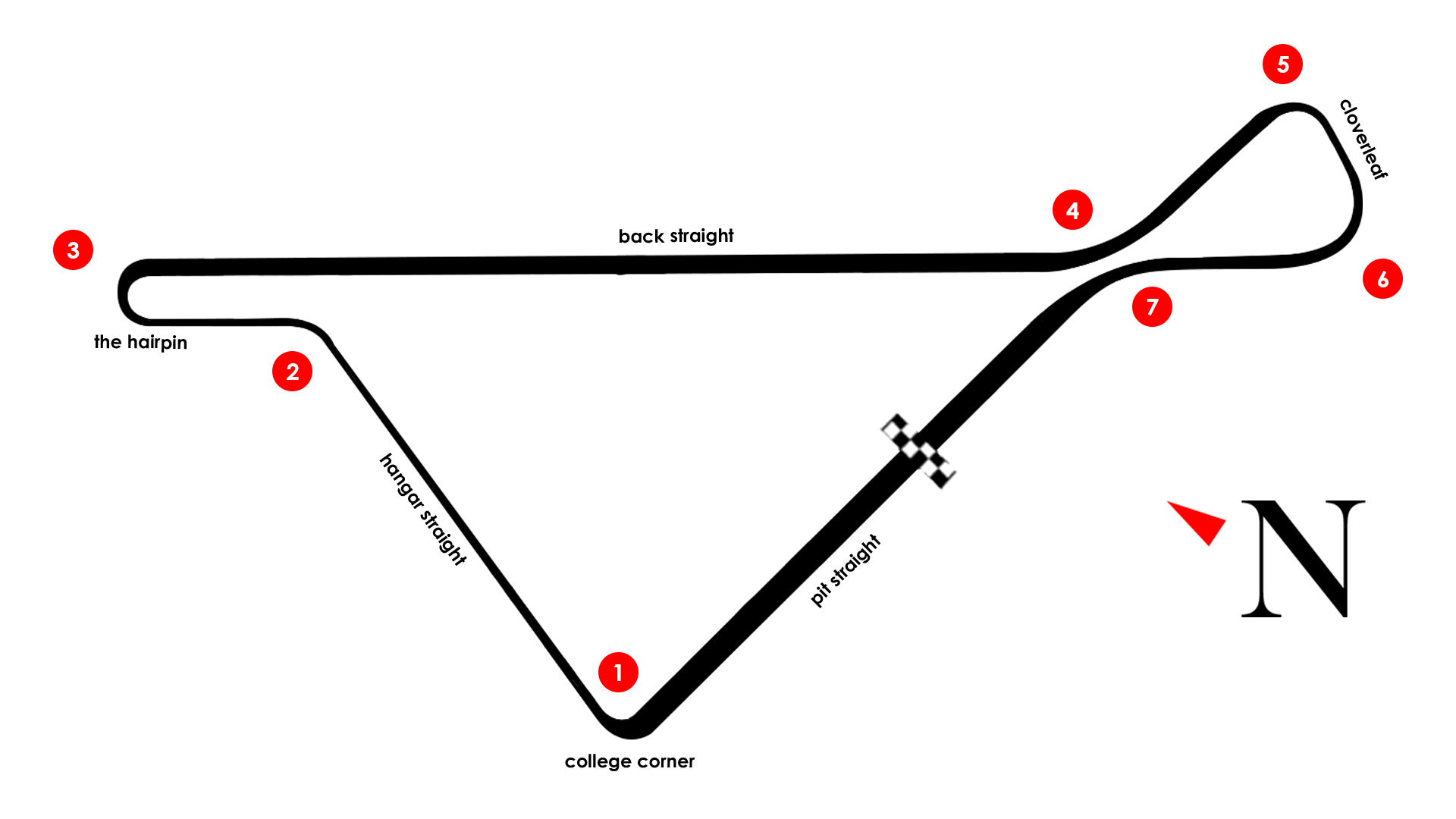

Race details
- Date: 10 January 1959
- Location: Ardmore Circuit, Auckland, New Zealand
- Course: Temporary racing facility
- Course length: 3.2 km (2.0 miles)
- Distance: 75 laps, 240 km (150 miles)
- Weather: Sunny

Pole position
Driver	(United Kingdom) Ron Flockhart	BRM P25
- Time: Determined by heats

Fastest lap
Driver	(United Kingdom) Stirling Moss	Cooper T45
- Time: 1:24.8

Podium
First	(United Kingdom) Stirling Moss	Cooper T45
Second	(Australia) Jack Brabham	Cooper T45
Third	(New Zealand) Bruce McLaren	Cooper T45

The 1959 New Zealand Grand Prix was a motor race held at the Ardmore Circuit on 10 January 1959. The race was held over 75 laps of the 3.2 kilometre circuit for a race distance of 240 kilometres. It was the seventh iteration of the event and was won by Stirling Moss.

== Classification ==
Pos	No.	Driver	Car	Laps	Time	Grid
1	7	(United Kingdom) Stirling Moss	Cooper T45 / Climax 2015cc 4cyl	75	1hr 48min 24.4sec	21
2		(Australia) Jack Brabham	Cooper T45 / Climax 2202cc 4cyl	75	+ 1:29.0 s	2
3	47	(New Zealand) Bruce McLaren	Cooper T45 / Climax 1964cc 4cyl	74	+ 1 Lap	3
4		(United States) Carroll Shelby (United States) Harry Schell	Maserati 250F / Maserati 2493cc 6cyl	73	+ 2 Laps	6
5		(New Zealand) Ross Jensen	Maserati 250F / Maserati 2493cc 6cyl	72	+ 3 Laps	7
6		(Australia) Bib Stillwell	Maserati 250F / Maserati 2497cc 6cyl	72	+ 3 Laps	8
7		(New Zealand) Syd Jensen	Cooper T45 / Climax 1460cc 4cyl	72	+ 3 Laps	10
8		(New Zealand) Bob Gibbons	Lycoming Special / Lycoming 4733cc 4cyl	72	+ 3 Laps	9
9		(New Zealand) Merv Neil	Lycoming Special / Lycoming 4733cc 4cyl	71	+ 4 Laps	14
10		(New Zealand) Tom Clark	Ferrari Super Squalo 555 / Ferrari 3431cc 4cyl	70	+ 5 Laps	12
11		(New Zealand) Pat Hoare	Ferrari 625 / Ferrari 2996cc 4cyl	70	+ 5 Laps	13
12		(Australia) Arnold Glass	Ferrari Super Squalo 555 / Ferrari 2497cc 4cyl	68	+ 7 Laps	16
13		(New Zealand) Len Gilbert	Cooper-Bristol Mk II / Bristol 1971cc 6cyl	66	+ 9 Laps	19
14		(New Zealand) Ken Harris	Ferrari 750 Monza / Ferrari 2999cc 4cyl	65	+ 10 Laps	18
15		(New Zealand) Gavin Quirk	Maserati 250F / Maserati 2497cc 6cyl	63	+ 12 Laps	17
Ret		(New Zealand) Johnny Mansel	Maserati 250F / Maserati 2497cc 6cyl	59	Engine	11
16		(New Zealand) Allan Freeman	Talbot-Lago T26C / Talbot 4485cc 6cyl	58	+ 17 Laps	20
Ret		(New Zealand) Ray Thackwell	Cooper T43 / Climax 1460cc 4cyl	47	Engine	15
Ret	1	(Sweden) Jo Bonnier	Maserati 250F / Maserati 2493cc 6cyl	41	Steering	4
Ret	3	(United States) Harry Schell	Maserati 250F / Maserati 2497cc 6cyl	24	Oil Leak	5
Ret		(United Kingdom) Ron Flockhart	BRM P25 / BRM 2497cc 4cyl	24	Oil Leak	1
Ret		(New Zealand) Tony Shelly	Cooper T41 / Climax 1496cc 4cyl	0	Retired	22
DNS		(New Zealand) Ron Duncan	Connaught A / Lea-Francis 1964cc 4cyl s/c		Did not start	
DNQ		(New Zealand) Frank Cantwell	Tojeiro 3/56 / Jaguar 3442cc 6cyl		Did not qualify	
DNQ		(New Zealand) Ron Roycroft	Ferrari 375 / Ferrari 4493cc V12		Did not qualify	
DNQ		(New Zealand) Brian Tracey	Alfa Romeo Tipo B / Alfa 2905cc 8cyl s/c		Did not qualify	
DNQ		(New Zealand) Graham Pierce	Austin Healey 100S / Austin 2660cc 8cyl s/c		Did not qualify	
DNQ		(New Zealand) Reg McCutcheon	Normac Special III / Chevrolet 3930cc 6cyl		Did not qualify	
DNQ		(New Zealand) Max Richards	Austin Healey 100S / Austin 2660cc 4cyl		Did not qualify	
DNA		(New Zealand) Jack Malcolm	Cooper-Bristol Mk II / Holden 2258cc 6cyl		Did Not Attend	
DNA		(Italy) Giorgio Scarlatti	Maserati 250F / Maserati 4477cc V8		Did Not Attend	
DNA		(Singapore) Chan Lye Choon	Aston Martin DB3S / Aston 2996cc 6cyl		Did Not Attend	
DNA		(New Zealand) John Cullen	Cullen 500 / Norton 498cc 1cyl		Did Not Attend	

Sporting positions
Preceded by 1958 New Zealand Grand Prix	New Zealand Grand Prix; 1959	Succeeded by 1960 New Zealand Grand Prix
