= 1964 New Zealand Grand Prix =

- Race 2 of 8 in 1964 Tasman Series
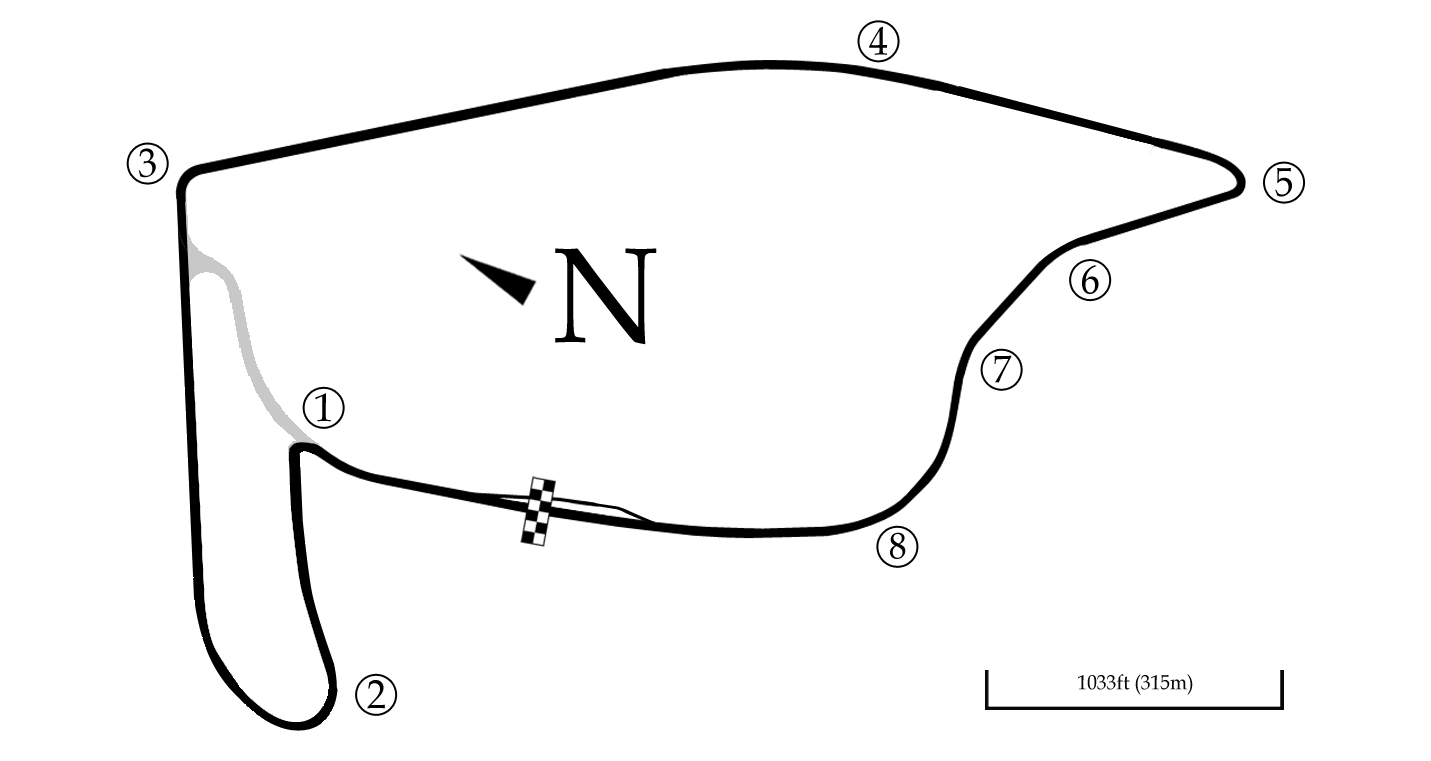

Race details
- Date: 11 January 1964
- Location: Pukekohe Park Raceway, Pukekohe, New Zealand
- Course: Permanent racing facility
- Course length: 2.82 km (1.76 miles)
- Distance: 50 laps, 141 km (88 miles)
- Weather: Sunny

Pole position
Driver	(Australia) Jack Brabham	Brabham-Climax

Fastest lap
Driver	(Australia) Frank Matich	Brabham-Climax
- Time: 1'26.2

Podium
First	(New Zealand) Bruce McLaren	Cooper-Climax
Second	(New Zealand) Denny Hulme	Brabham-Climax
Third	(United States) Timmy Mayer	Cooper-Climax

The 1964 New Zealand Grand Prix was a race held at Pukekohe Park Raceway on 11 January 1964. The race had 16 starters.

It was the eleventh New Zealand Grand Prix and doubled as round two of the 1964 Tasman Series. Bruce McLaren broke through to finally win his home grand prix in what was the official Tasman Series. This win paved the way for McLaren's overall victory in the first Tasman Series.

== Classification ==
Results as follows:

Pos	No.	Driver	Team	Car	Laps	Time	Points
1	47	(New Zealand) Bruce McLaren	Bruce McLaren Motor Racing	Cooper T70 / Climax FPF 2.5	50	1h 14m 20.7s	9
2	5	(New Zealand) Denny Hulme	Brabham Racing	Brabham BT4 / Climax FPF 2.5	50	1h 14m 25.1s	6
3	48	(United States) Timmy Mayer	Bruce McLaren Motor Racing	Cooper T70 / Climax FPF 2.5	50	1h 14m 36.4s	4
4	8	(Australia) John Youl	John Youl	Cooper T55 / Climax FPF 2.5	50	1h 15m 21.6s	3
5	41	(New Zealand) Jim Palmer	Frank Garrett	Cooper T53 / Climax FPF 2.5	49		2
6	11	(New Zealand) Tony Shelly	Shelly Motors Ltd.	Lotus 18/21 / Climax FPF 2.5	48		1
7	12	(New Zealand) Andy Buchanan	Wilson Motors Ltd.	Brabham BT6 / Ford 1.6	46		
8	6	(New Zealand) David Young	David Young	Cooper T59 / Ford 1.5	46		
9	22	(New Zealand) Roly Levis	R.A. Levis	Lotus 22 / Ford 1.6	45		
10	23	(New Zealand) Dene Hollier	Dene Hollier Ltd.	Cooper T52 / Ford 1.5	43		
11	7	(New Zealand) Ken Sager	J.H. Sager	Lotus 20 / Ford 1.5	43		
12	25	(New Zealand) Rex Flowers	Flowers Transport	Lotus 20B / Ford 1.5	43		
Ret	4	(Australia) Jack Brabham	Brabham Racing	Brabham BT7A / Climax FPF 2.5	29		
Ret	2	(Australia) Frank Matich	Team Total	Brabham BT7A / Climax FPF 2.5	27		
Ret		(Australia) Arnold Glass	Capitol Motors	Lotus 27 / Ford 1.5	26		
Ret	3	(New Zealand) Chris Amon	Reg Parnell Racing	Lola Mk4 / Climax FPF 2.5	12		
Ret	16	(New Zealand) Jim Boyd	Jack Malcolm	Valour VP1 / Ford 1.1	11		
DNS	9	(New Zealand) Bill Thomasen	Corsair Racing Team	Cooper T51 / Climax FPF 2.0			
DNQ	15	(New Zealand) Ken Smith	M.J. Smith	Lola Mk.2 / Ford 1.5			

== Notes ==
- Pole position: Jack Brabham
- Fastest lap: Frank Matich – 1'26.2

Preceded by 1964 Levin International	Tasman Series; 1964	Succeeded by 1964 Lady Wigram Trophy
Preceded by 1963 New Zealand Grand Prix	New Zealand Grand Prix; 1964	Succeeded by 1965 New Zealand Grand Prix
