= Maserati 250F =

Formula One car (1954–1960)

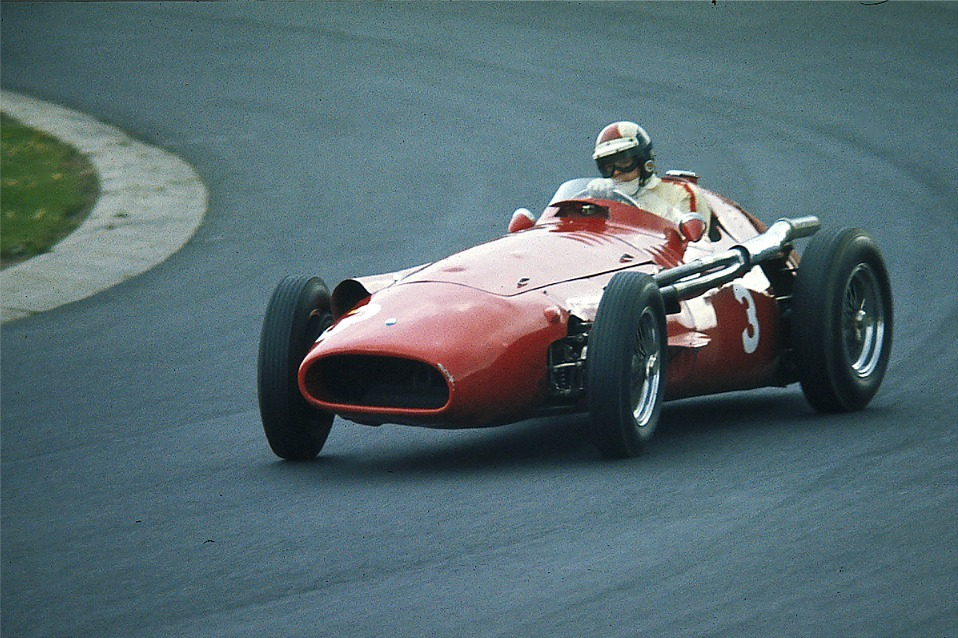
- Category: Formula One
- Constructor: Maserati
- Designers: Gioacchino Colombo; Valerio Colotti
- Production: 1954–1958
- Predecessor: Maserati A6GCM
- Successor: Maserati 300S

Technical specifications
- Chassis: Aluminium tubular ladder frame
- Suspension (front): Independent wishbone
- Suspension (rear): De Dion tube
- Engine: Maserati 1954 – 2,493 cc (152.1 cu in), straight 6; 1957 – 2,491 cc (152.0 cu in) works cars V12, naturally aspirated, All models: front engine, longitudinally mounted
- Transmission: 1954: Maserati 4 speed manual 1956: Stirnsi 5 speed manual
- Fuel: 50% methanol, 35% petrol, 10% acetone, 4% benzol, 1% castor oil
- Tyres: Pirelli

Competition history
- Notable entrants: Officine Alfieri Maserati, Owen Racing Organisation, Equipe Moss/Stirling Moss Ltd
- Notable drivers: (Argentina) Juan Manuel Fangio, (United Kingdom) Stirling Moss
- Debut: 1954 Argentine Grand Prix, J.M. Fangio, 1st
Races	Wins	Poles	F/Laps
46	8	8	10
- Constructors' Championships: 0 (Note that the Constructors' Championship was first awarded in 1958)
- Drivers' Championships: 2
- Unless otherwise stated, all data refer to Formula One World Championship Grands Prix only.

Maserati 250F at Goodwood Festival of Speed 2009

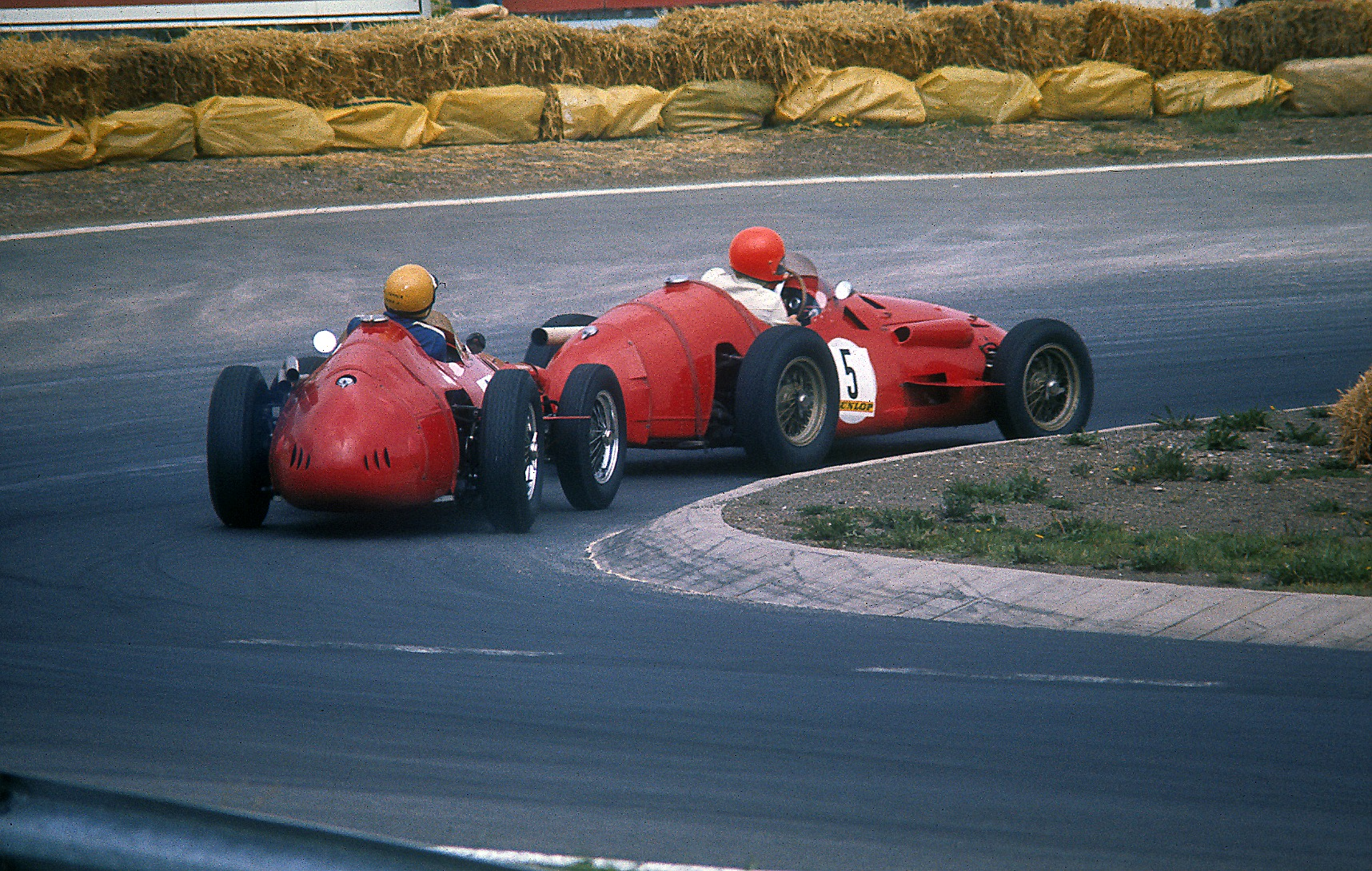
Maserati 250 F 1955

The Maserati 250F was a racing car made by Maserati of Italy used in '2.5 litre' Formula One racing between January 1954 and November 1960. Twenty-six examples were made.

== Mechanical details ==
The 250F principally used the SSG, 220 bhp (at 7400rpm) 2,493 cc (152.1 cu in) capacity 84 mm × 75 mm (3.31 in × 2.95 in) Maserati A6 straight-six engine, ribbed 13.4" drum brakes, wishbone independent front suspension, a De Dion tube axle, Borrani 16" and 17" wheels and Pirelli Stella Bianca tyres. It was designed by Gioacchino Colombo, Vittorio Bellentani and Alberto Massimino; the tubular work was by Valerio Colotti. A streamlined version with bodywork which partially enclosed the wheels (similar to the 1954 Mercedes-Benz W196 "Typ Monza") was used in the 1956 French Grand Prix.

Technical data	250F	250F T2
Engine:	Front mounted 6-cylinder in-line engine	Front mounted 60° 12 cylinder V engine
displacement:	2493 cc	2491 cc
Bore × stroke:	84 × 75 mm	68.7 × 56 mm
Max power at rpm:	270 hp (199 kW) at 8,000 rpm	310 hp (228 kW) at 9,300 rpm
Valve control:	2 overhead camshafts, 2 valves per cylinder
Carburetor:	3 Weber 45DCO3	6 Weber 35IDM
Gearbox:	4/5-speed manual, transaxle
suspension front:	Double wishbones, coil springs, hydraulic shock absorbers
suspension rear:	De Dion axle, transverse leaf springs, hydraulic shock absorbers
Brakes:	Hydraulic drum brakes
Chassis & body:	Fackverk frame with aluminum body	steel tubular spaceframe
wheelbase:	2,280 mm (90 in)
Dry weight:	About 630 kg (1,400 lb)	About 650 kg (1,400 lb)
Top speed:	290 km/h (180 mph)	305 km/h (190 mph)

== Images ==
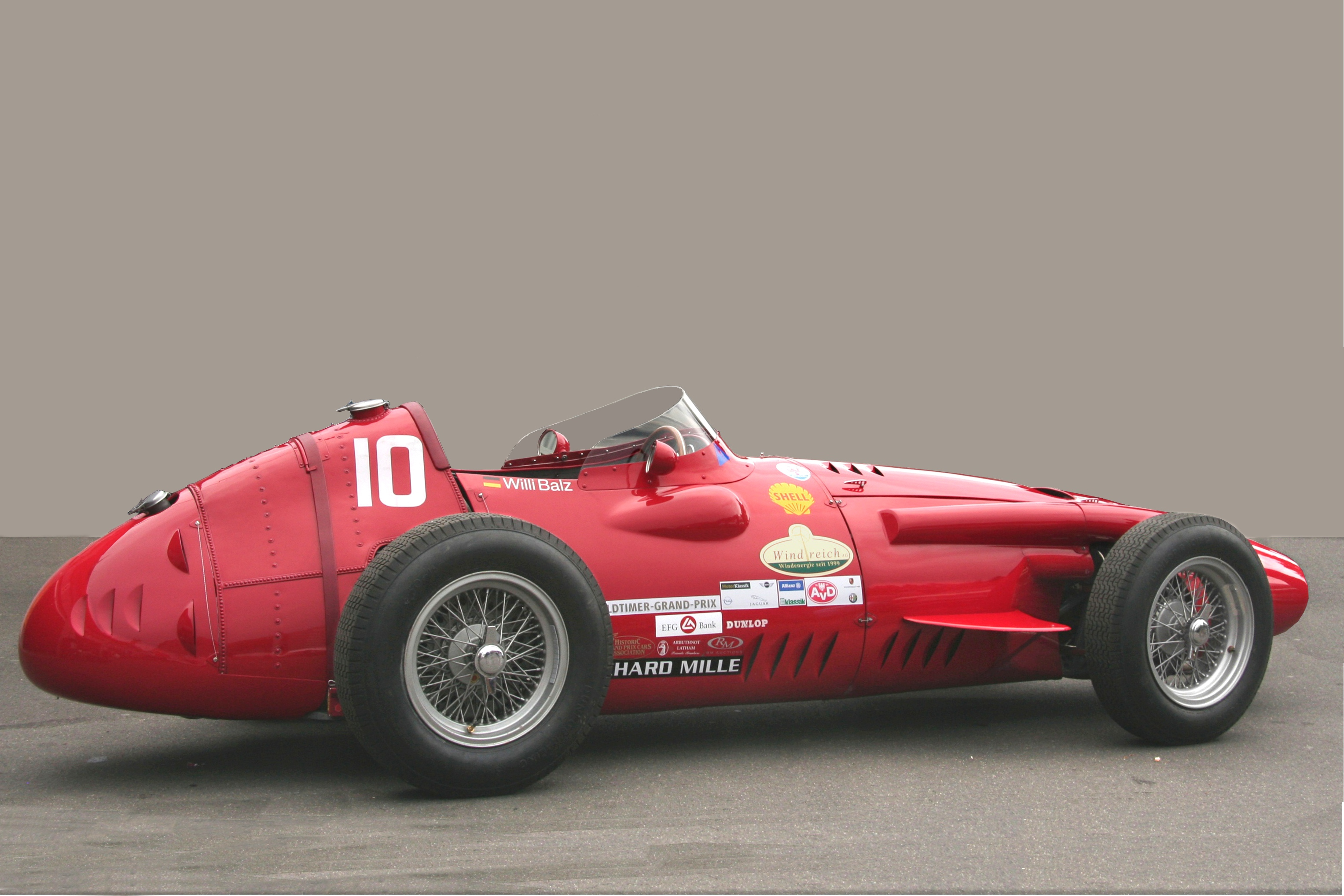
Maserati 250F

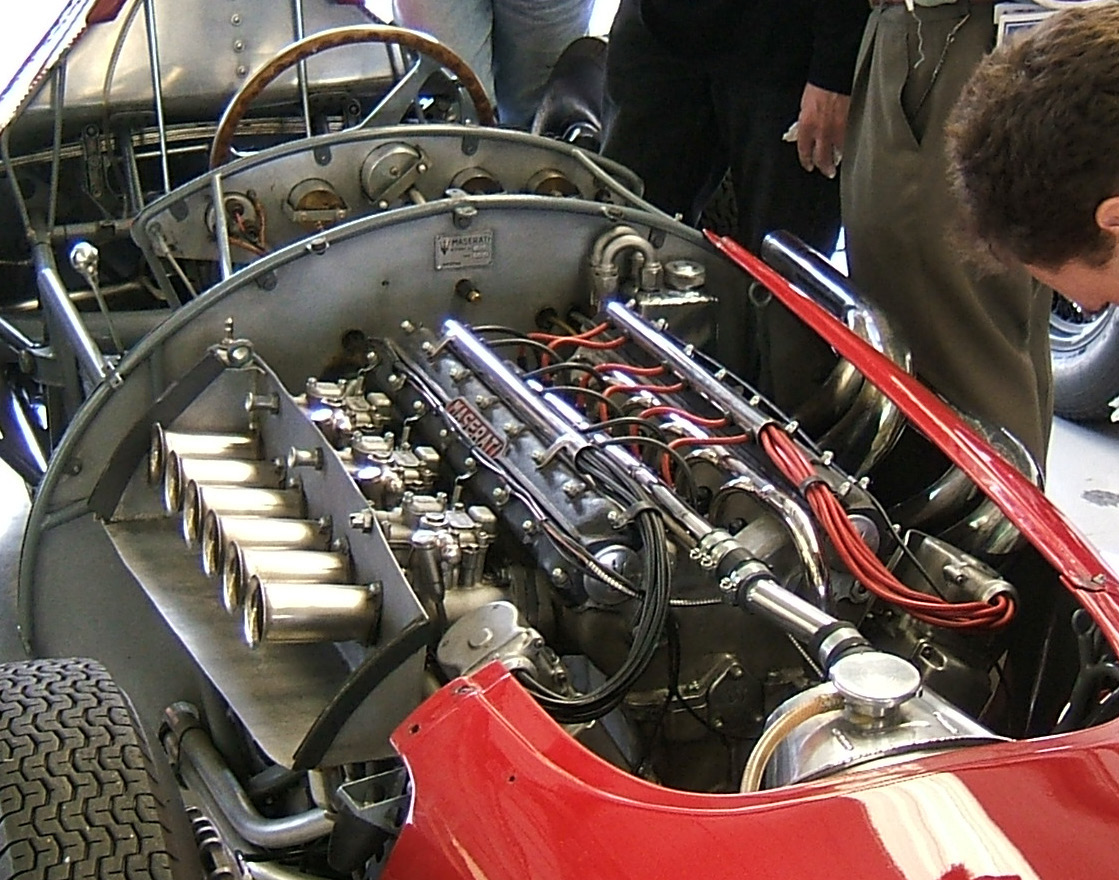
straight 6 Maserati 250 F

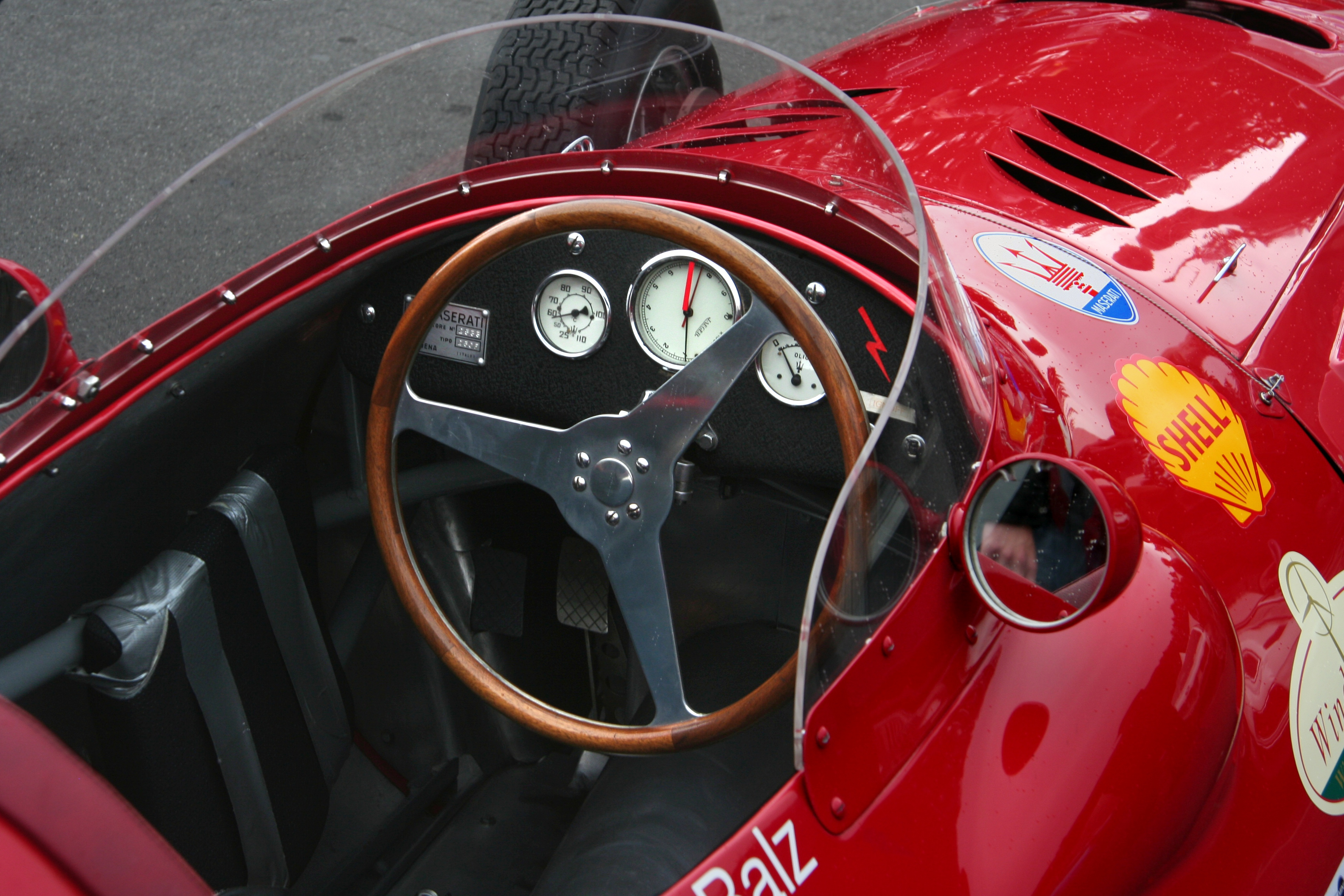
Cockpit

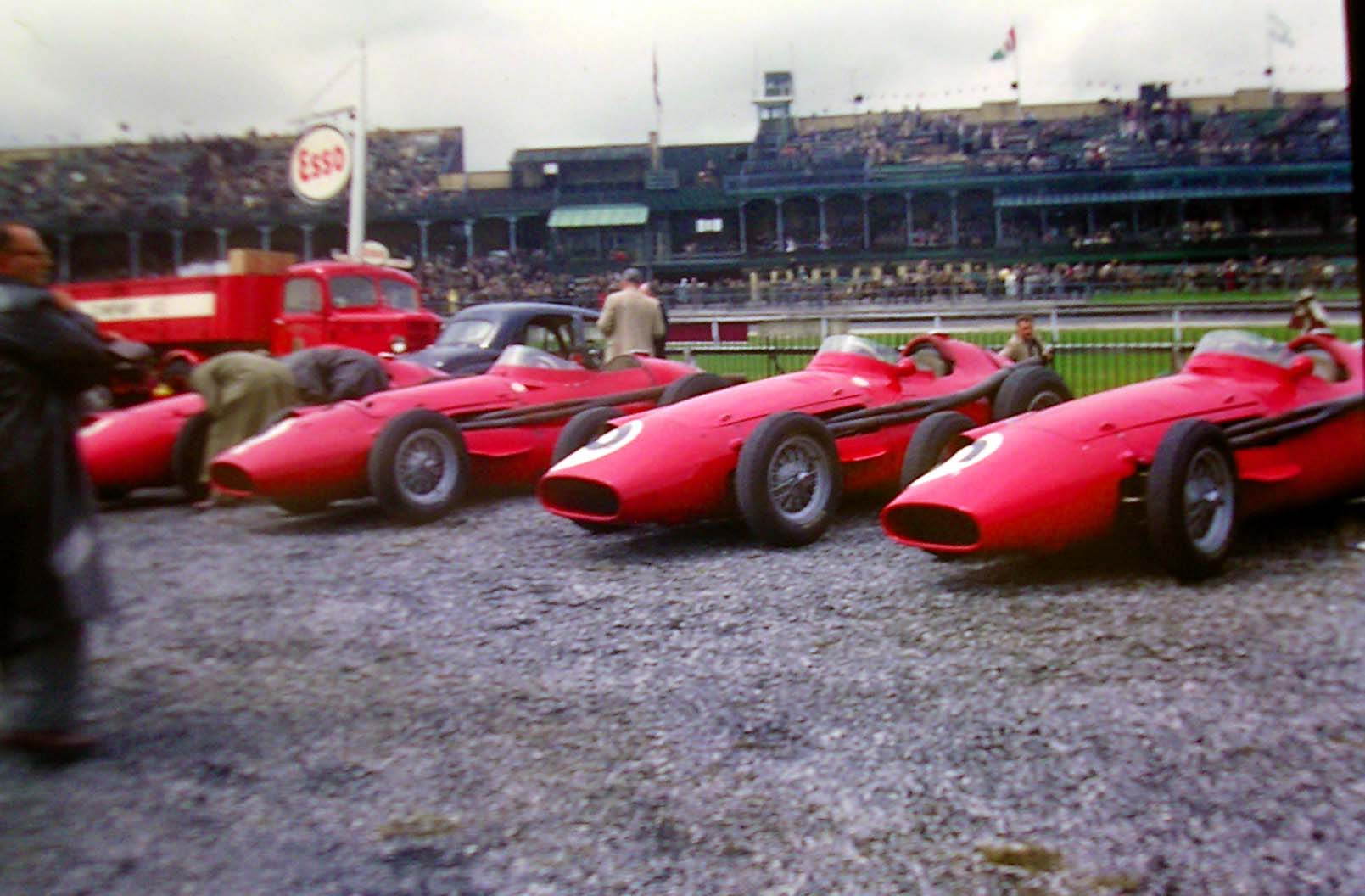
Works team at Aintree, 1957

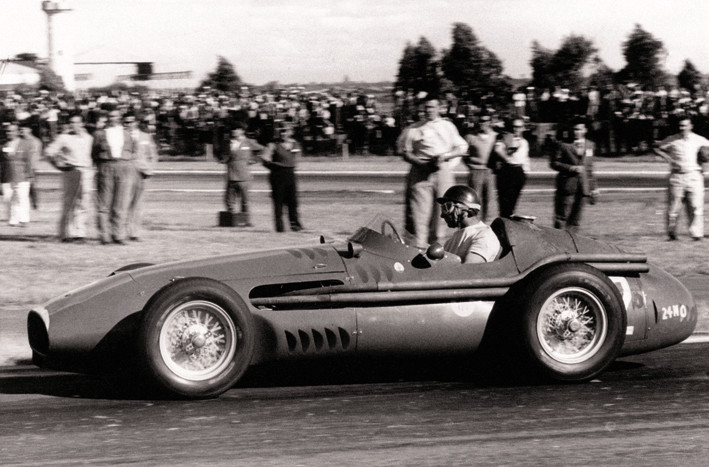
Fangio and 250F

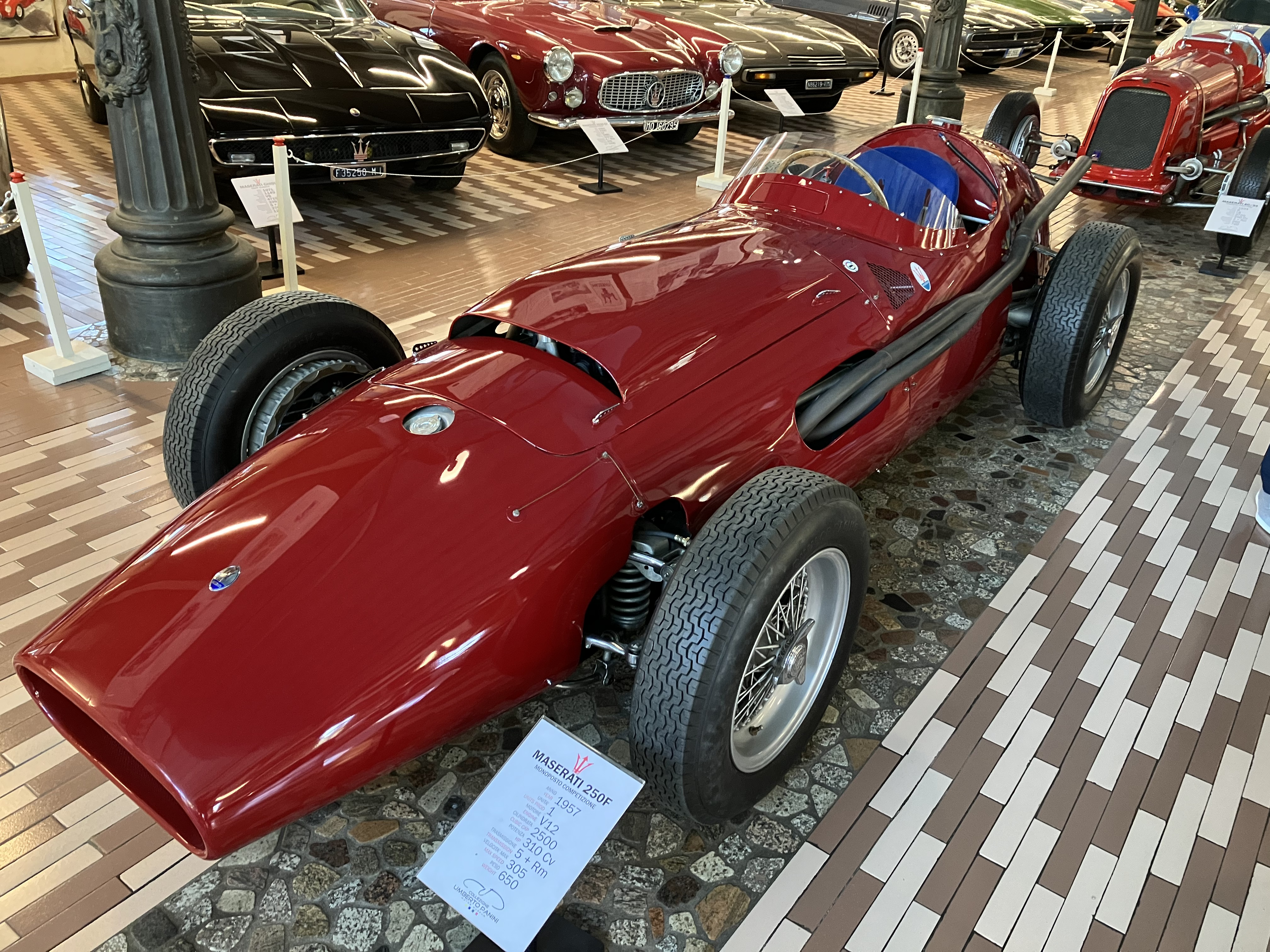
Maserati 250F v12 at the Umberto Panini museum

== Racing history ==
The 250F first raced in the 1954 Argentine Grand Prix where Juan Manuel Fangio won the first of his two victories before he left for the new Mercedes-Benz team. Fangio won the 1954 Drivers' World Championship, with points gained with both Maserati and Mercedes-Benz; Stirling Moss raced his own privately owned 250F for the full 1954 season. Prince Bira was another driver favouring the 250F.

In 1955 a 5-speed gearbox; SU fuel injection (240 bhp) and Dunlop disc brakes were introduced. Jean Behra drove this in a five-member works team which included Luigi Musso.

In 1956 Stirling Moss won the Monaco and Italian Grands Prix, both in a works car.

In 1956 three 250F T2 cars first appeared for the works drivers. Developed by Giulio Alfieri using lighter steel tubes they sported a slimmer, stiffer body and sometimes the new 315 bhp (235 kW) V12 engine of 2,491 cc (152.0 cu in) capacity 68.7 mm × 56 mm (2.70 in × 2.20 in), although it offered little or no real advantage over the older straight 6. It was later developed into the 3 litre V12 that won two races powering the Cooper T81 and T86 from 1966 to 1969, the final "Tipo 10" variant of the engine having three valves and two spark plugs per cylinder.

In 1957 Juan Manuel Fangio drove to four more championship victories, including his final win at German Grand Prix at the Nürburgring (Aug. 4, 1957), where he overcame a 48-second deficit in 22 laps, passing the race leader, Mike Hawthorn, on the final lap to take the win. In doing so he broke the lap record at the Nürburgring, 10 times.

By the 1958 season, the 250F was totally outclassed by the new rear engined F1 cars. However, the car remained a favourite with the privateers, including Maria Teresa de Filippis, and was used by back markers through the 1960 F1 season, the last for the 2.5 litre formula.

In total, the 250F competed in 46 Formula One championship races with 277 entries, leading to eight wins. Success was not limited to World Championship events with 250F drivers winning many non-championship races around the world.

Stirling Moss later said that the 250F was the best front-engined F1 car he drove.

=== World Championship wins ===
Year	Race	Circuit	Driver
1954	(Argentina) Argentine Grand Prix	Autódromo 17 de Octubre	(Argentina) Juan Manuel Fangio
1954	(Belgium) Belgian Grand Prix	Spa-Francorchamps	(Argentina) Juan Manuel Fangio
1956	Monaco Grand Prix	Monte Carlo	(United Kingdom) Stirling Moss
1956	(Italy) Italian Grand Prix	Monza	(United Kingdom) Stirling Moss
1957	(Argentina) Argentine Grand Prix	Autódromo 17 de Octubre	(Argentina) Juan Manuel Fangio
1957	Monaco Grand Prix	Monte Carlo	(Argentina) Juan Manuel Fangio
1957	(France) French Grand Prix	Rouen-Les-Essarts	(Argentina) Juan Manuel Fangio
1957	(Germany) German Grand Prix	Nürburgring	(Argentina) Juan Manuel Fangio

=== Non-World Championship wins ===
Non-World Championship wins
Year	Race	Circuit	Driver
1954	(United Kingdom) II Curtis Trophy	Snetterton	(United Kingdom) Roy Salvadori
1954	(Italy) XIII Rome Grand Prix	Castelfusano	(Argentina) Onofre Marimón
1954	(United Kingdom) I International Gold Cup	Goodwood	(United Kingdom) Stirling Moss
1954	(Italy) XXIII Pescara Grand Prix	Pescara	(Italy) Luigi Musso
1954	(United Kingdom) VII Goodwood Trophy	Goodwood	(United Kingdom) Stirling Moss
1954	(United Kingdom) I Daily Telegraph Trophy	Goodwood	(United Kingdom) Stirling Moss
1955	III New Zealand Grand Prix	Ardmore	(Thailand) Prince Bira
1955	(France) XVI Pau Grand Prix	Pau	(France) Jean Behra
1955	(United Kingdom) I Glover Trophy	Goodwood	(United Kingdom) Roy Salvadori
1955	(France) IV Bordeaux Grand Prix	Bordeaux	(France) Jean Behra
1955	(United Kingdom) VII BRDC International Trophy	Goodwood	(United Kingdom) Peter Collins
1955	(France) XVII Albi Grand Prix	Albi	(France) André Simon
1955	(United Kingdom) III Curtis Trophy	Snetterton	(United Kingdom) Roy Salvadori
1955	(United Kingdom) III London Trophy	Crystal Palace	(United Kingdom) Mike Hawthorn
1955	(United Kingdom) III Daily Record Trophy	Charterhall	(United Kingdom) Bob Gerard
1955	(United Kingdom) II Daily Telegraph Trophy	Aintree	(United Kingdom) Roy Salvadori
1955	(United Kingdom) II International Gold Cup	Oulton Park	(United Kingdom) Stirling Moss
1956	IV New Zealand Grand Prix	Ardmore	(United Kingdom) Stirling Moss
1956	(United Kingdom) IV Glover Trophy	Goodwood	(United Kingdom) Stirling Moss
1956	(United Kingdom) XI BARC Aintree 200	Aintree	(United Kingdom) Stirling Moss
1956	(United Kingdom) I Aintree 100	Aintree	(United Kingdom) Horace Gould
1956	(United Kingdom) I Vanwall Trophy	Snetterton	(United Kingdom) Horace Gould
1956	(France) IV Caen Grand Prix	Circuit de la Prairie	(United States) Harry Schell
1957	(Argentina) XI Buenos Aires Grand Prix	Autódromo Oscar Alfredo Gálvez	(Argentina) Juan Manuel Fangio
1957	(France) XVII Pau Grand Prix	Pau	(France) Jean Behra
1957	(Italy) V Modena Grand Prix	Modena	(France) Jean Behra
1957	(Morocco) VI Grand Prix de Maroc	Ain-Diab Circuit	(France) Jean Behra
