= Ardmore Airport (New Zealand) =

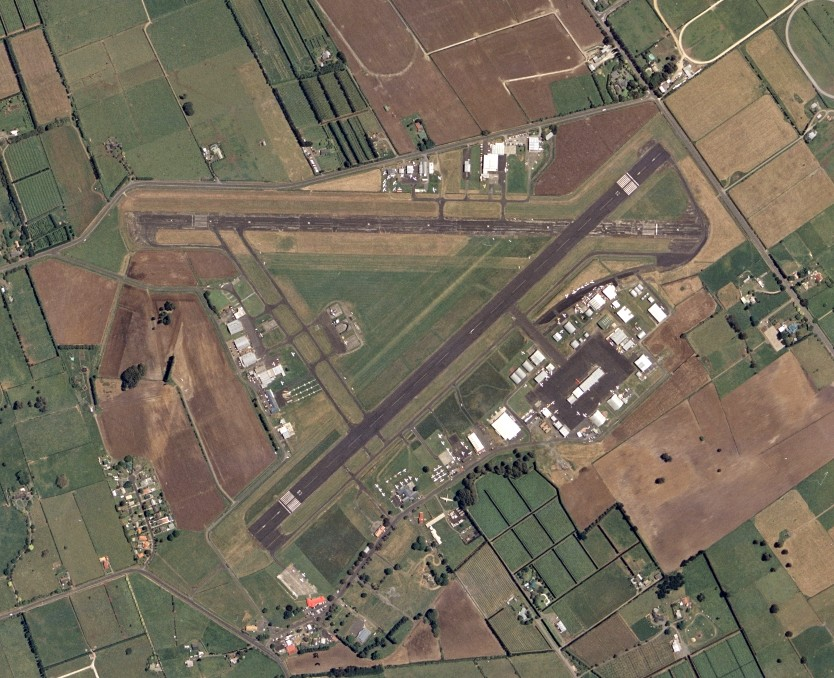
- IATA: AMZ; ICAO: NZAR

Summary
- Airport type: Public
- Owner: Ardmore Airport Ltd
- Operator: New Zealand Civil Aviation Authority
- Location: Auckland
- Opened: 1945 (81 years ago)
- Operating base for: Ardmore Flying School; Auckland Rescue Helicopter
- Time zone: NZST (UTC+12:00)
  - Summer (DST): NZDT (UTC+13:00)
- Elevation AMSL: 34 m (112 ft)
- Coordinates: 37°01′47″S 174°58′24″E
- Website: ardmoreairport.co.nz
- Interactive map of Ardmore Airport

Runways
Direction	Length		Surface
Direction	ft	m	Surface
03R/21L	4,630	1,411	Asphalt
03L/21R	1,700	518	Grass
07/25	1,960	597	Grass

Ardmore Airport (IATA: AMZ, ICAO: NZAR) is an airport 3 nautical miles (5.5 km) southeast of Manurewa in Auckland, New Zealand.

== History ==
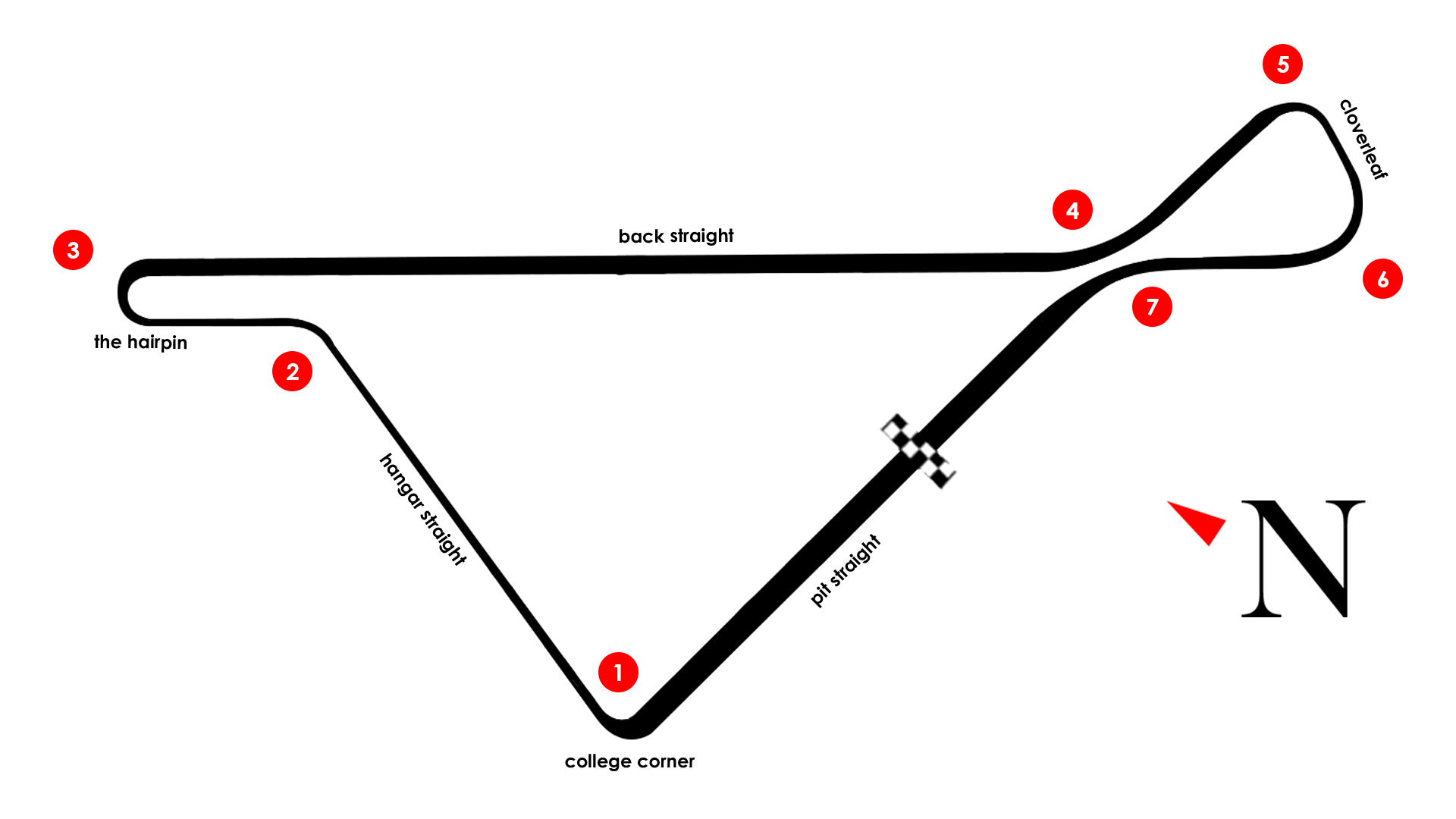
Ardmore Circuit was home to the New Zealand Grand Prix from 1954 to 1962.

Ardmore was constructed during World War II for USAAF forces stationed in Auckland by NZ Public Works Department and was intended to be used as a base for fighter aircraft. Due to developments in the Pacific War it was never used for this purpose but was instead was used by the RNZAF, who operated Corsair fighters. RNZAF Auckland operations were consolidated at Whenuapai after World War II. From the post-war years until the mid-1970s the grounds were home to a teacher training unit and the Auckland University School of Engineering.

=== New Zealand Grand Prix ===
From 1954 until 1962 the aerodrome was home to the New Zealand Grand Prix with the circuit being approximately 2 miles (3.2 km) in length and utilising the two sealed runways operational at the time. In 1954 and 1955, about 70,000 spectators attended the event. Local authorities made the decision to open the facility to general aviation and the Grand Prix was moved to Pukekohe upon completion of a purpose built facility there. British racing driver Ken Wharton was killed at the NZ Grand Prix at Ardmore on 12 January 1957 when he crashed his Ferrari Monza.

== Present day ==
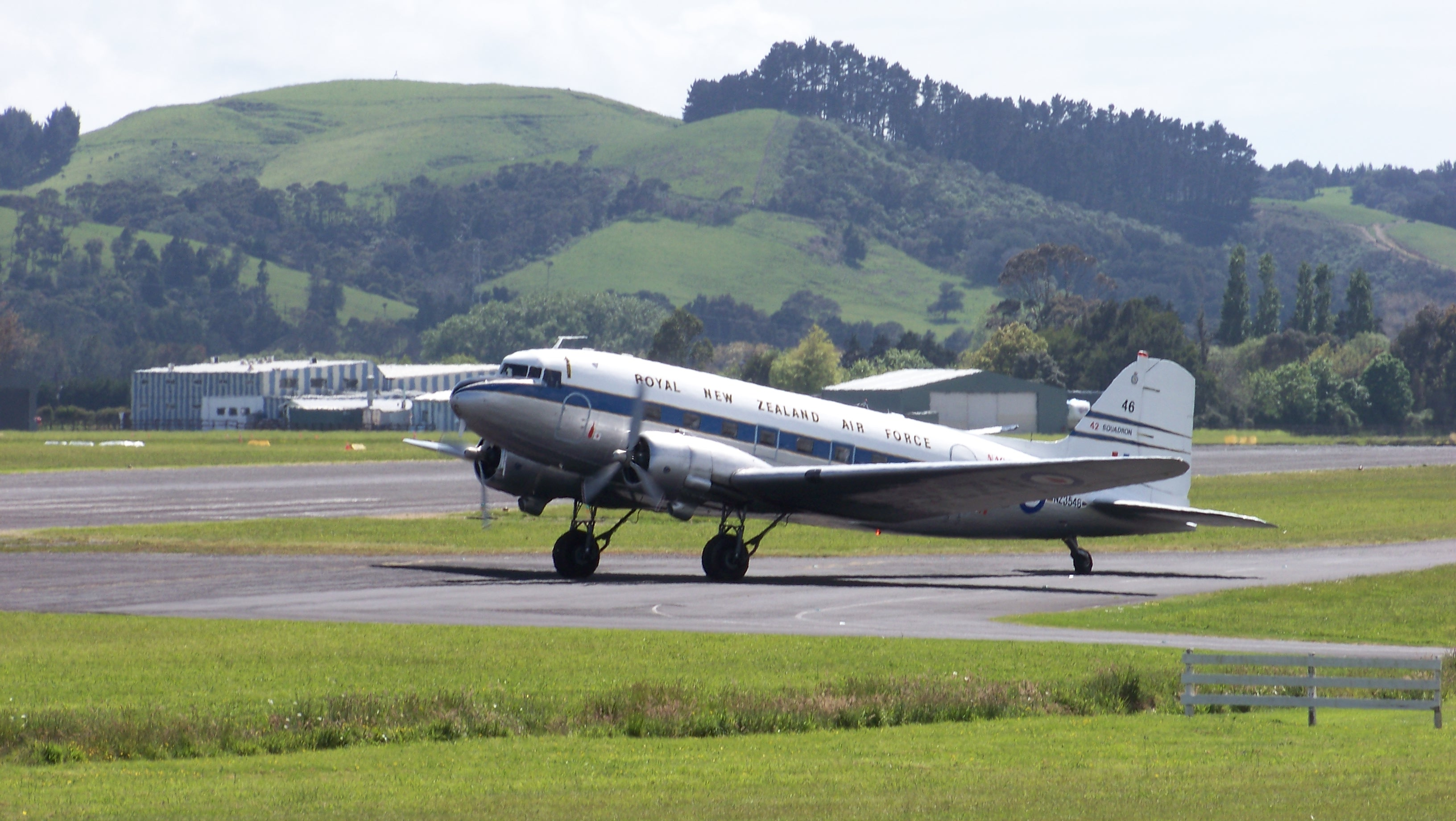
Aircraft based at Ardmore include this Douglas C-47 Dakota.

Ardmore Airport is one of New Zealand's busiest general aviation airfields. Traffic mainly consists of small private aircraft and the classic aircraft of the New Zealand Warbirds Association, which is based there. Businesses in the airfield include several flying schools, maintenance, fuel and aircraft restoration. Buildings are situated around aprons to the north, west, south and southeast.

A control tower remains in the centre of the field but this is no longer used for air traffic control. It is now used as a UNICOM service.

== Operational information ==
Ardmore has six vectors: 03/21 sealed runway, 03/21 grass runway and 07/25 grass runway. There used to be a 07/25 sealed runway but this is no longer used and is now a taxiway (Taxiway Juliet).

The airfield has a circuit height of 1,100 ft (340 m) for fixed-wing aircraft, 800 ft (240 m) for helicopters. The circuit for runways 03 and 07 is right-hand while that for runways 21 and 25 is left-hand.

The airfield is serviced by two R-NAV (GPS) arrivals, one for each runway (03 and 21). The airport itself is uncontrolled and located within a Mandatory Broadcast Zone (MBZ). This airspace is monitored by the Ardmore Unicom service who operate during daylight hours. The aerodrome is located to the south east of Auckland International Airport airspace.

== Accidents and incidents ==
Accidents and incidents that occurred at or near Ardmore Airport include:

- 21 November 1944 – A Corsair based at Ardmore attempted a forced landing and crashed 1/2 a mile from the aerodrome. Fg Off D.G.A. Ritchie later died of injuries.
- 6 March 1945 – A Corsair turned onto its back while coming in to land. Flt Sgt J.W. Wright was injured.
- 24 February 1990 - A Harvard (AT6) crashed into the north end of the airfield during scheduled formation practice. Pilot in command J.I Greenstreet died.
- 3 December 2009 – A restored Spitfire tipped onto its nose while landing, damaging the propeller and undercarriage.
- 27 September 2010 – A helicopter with two people on board was reported (by TV3 News) to have crashed. The aircraft reported a technical problem. A witness said the helicopter circled the aerodrome using up fuel and then the engine was cut and it glided in to land safely.
- 4 January 2014 – A Barber Snark (ZK-JEK) landed and vacated the runway before catching fire. Both occupants escaped without injury.
- 6 March 2014 – A light twin Beechcraft Duchess suffered an undercarriage failure on the runway at Ardmore.
- 29 June 2014 – A light aircraft, Cessna 152, had to make an emergency landing in a field approx. 3NM East of the airfield. The aircraft made a successful landing in the field before flipping upside down.
- 28 September 2016 – A T-28 Trojan successfully made a belly landing after its landing gear failed.

== Airlines and destinations ==
Airlines	Destinations
Sunair	Claris

== See also ==
- List of airports in New Zealand
- List of airlines of New Zealand
- Transport in New Zealand
