= 2003 New Zealand Grand Prix =

- 48th New Zealand Grand Prix

Race details
- Date: 19 January 2003
- Location: Teretonga Park, Feilding, New Zealand
- Course: Permanent racing facility
- Course length: 2.57 km (1.59 miles)
- Distance: 40 laps, 102.8 km (63.6 miles)
- Weather: Fine

Pole position
Driver	(New Zealand) Jonny Reid	Van Diemen RF94
- Time: 1:03.279

Fastest lap
Driver	(New Zealand) Jonny Reid	Van Diemen RF94
- Time: 1:03.036 on lap 9

Podium
First	(New Zealand) Jonny Reid	Van Diemen RF94
Second	(New Zealand) Chris Pither	Spectrum 010
Third	(New Zealand) Daniel Gaunt	Van Diemen Stealth

The 2003 New Zealand Grand Prix was an open wheel racing car race held at Teretonga Park, near Invercargill on 19 January 2003. It was the 48th New Zealand Grand Prix and was open to Formula Ford cars.

The event was dominated by Jonny Reid who completed a clean sweep of pole position, fastest lap and race win. Chris Pither and Daniel Gaunt rounded out the podium.

== Race report ==
As with the previous years event, the Grand Prix was held over two 20-lap segments. This was a measure implemented as the Formula Ford fuel tank did not have the capacity to negotiate the full 40 laps. Thus once the 20th lap was completed, all cars were brought into the pitlane for refuelling before resuming once again under a safety car restart.

Reid dominated proceedings and led the entire race distance. However, the second half of the race was beset with incidents that saw the safety car redeployed over again. Veteran Ken Smith was livid with the driving standards during the race and let know his feelings to the offenders. Reid took the overall race win with Pither in second and Gaunt in third.

== Classification ==
=== Qualifying ===
Pos	No.	Driver	Car	Q1	Q2	Grid
1	9	(New Zealand) Jonny Reid	Van Diemen RF94	1:02.977	1:03.279	1
2	22	(New Zealand) Chris Pither	Spectrum 001	1:03.453	1:03.608	2
3	28	(New Zealand) Nelson Hartley	Stealth RF94 Evo 2	1:03.566	1:03.880	3
4	47	(New Zealand) Daniel Gaunt	Van Diemen Stealth	1:03.661	1:03.925	4
5	2	(New Zealand) Simon Richards	Van Diemen RF02	1:03.059	1:03.992	5
6	66	(Australia) Bryce Washington	Stealth Ford	1:03.736	1:04.194	6
7	34	(New Zealand) Michael Shepherd	Van Diemen Stealth	1:03.737	1:04.293	7
8	11	(New Zealand) Ken Smith	Van Diemen Stealth	1:03.417	1:04.310	8
9	4	(New Zealand) Andrew Higgins	Van Diemen RF94	1:03.728	1:04.798	9
10	7	(New Zealand) Simon Gamble	Van Diemen RF90	1:03.241	1:05.148	10
11	39	(United States) Ryan Millen	Van Diemen	1:03.843		11
12	40	(New Zealand) Bruce Henley	Van Diemen RF92	1:04.448		12
13	26	(New Zealand) Tim Edgell	Van Diemen RF03	1:04.586		13
14	55	(New Zealand) Christina Orr	Stealth Ford RF94	1:04.633		14
15	14	(New Zealand) Richard Reid	Van Diemen RF92	1:04.678		15
16	88	(New Zealand) Mathew Radisich	Spectrum 010	1:04.992		16
17	53	(New Zealand) Robert Toshach	Swift FB89	1:05.148		17
18	70	(New Zealand) Jayant Singh	Van Diemen RF92	1:05.151		18
19	44	(New Zealand) Noel Atley	Crossle 55F	1:05.514		19
20	32	(New Zealand) Gary Love	Van Diemen RF92	1:05.671		20
21	25	(New Zealand) Stan Redmond	Van Diemen RF92	1:05.785		21
22	99	(New Zealand) Marc Doran	Van Diemen RF94	1:05.938		22
23	77	(New Zealand) Steve Edwards	Swift FB88	1:06.112		23
24	42	(New Zealand) Tony Graham	Swift SC92F	1:06.469		24
25	27	(New Zealand) Wayne Colville	Van Diemen RF81	1:06.891		25
26	85	(New Zealand) Carmen Doran	Rae 86F	1:07.108		26
27	37	(New Zealand) Stephen Heffernan	Van Diemen RF87	1:08.151		27
28	45	(New Zealand) Jason Greer	Van Diemen RF86	1:08.505		28
29	75	(New Zealand) Munro Tall	Swift FB4	1:08.619		29
30	71	(New Zealand) Robin Judkins	Lola 644 E	1:08.688		30
31	17	(New Zealand) Gordon McIntyre	Swift FB91	1:09.556		31

=== Race ===
Pos	No.	Driver	Car	Laps	Time	Grid
1	9	(New Zealand) Jonny Reid	Van Diemen RF94	40	01hr 00min 16.078sec	1
2	22	(New Zealand) Chris Pither	Spectrum 010	40	+ 2.163 s	2
3	47	(New Zealand) Daniel Gaunt	Van Diemen Stealth	40	+ 3.059 s	4
4	28	(New Zealand) Nelson Hartley	Stealth RF94 Evo 2	40	+ 9.698 s	3
5	7	(New Zealand) Simon Gamble	Van Diemen RF90	40	+ 12.884 s	10
6	2	(New Zealand) Simon Richards	Van Diemen RF02	40	+ 13.918 s	5
7	34	(New Zealand) Michael Shepherd	Van Diemen RF94	40	+ 14.777 s	7
8	55	(New Zealand) Christina Orr	Stealth Ford RF94	40	+ 14.816 s	14
9	14	(New Zealand) Richard Reid	Van Diemen RF92	40	+ 15.618 s	15
10	26	(New Zealand) Tim Edgell	Van Diemen RF03	40	+ 21.954 s	13
11	39	(United States) Ryan Millen	Van Diemen	40	+ 23.297 s	11
12	53	(New Zealand) Robert Toshasch	Swift FB89	40	+ 27.555 s	17
13	88	(New Zealand) Mathew Radisich	Spectrum 010	40	+ 27.646 s	16
14	4	(New Zealand) Andrew Higgins	Van Diemen RF94	40	+ 29.364 s	9
15	32	(New Zealand) Gary Love	Van Diemen RF92	40	+ 31.664 s	20
16	66	(Australia) Bryce Washington	Stealth Ford	39	+ 1 lap	6
17	44	(New Zealand) Noel Atley	Crossle 55F	39	+ 1 lap	19
18	99	(New Zealand) Marc Doran	Van Diemen RF94	39	+ 1 lap	22
19	77	(New Zealand) Steve Edwards	Swift FB88	39	+ 1 lap	23
20	27	(New Zealand) Wayne Colville	Van Diemen RF92	39	+ 1 lap	25
21	17	(New Zealand) Gordon McIntyre	Swift FB91	38	+ 2 laps	31
22	85	(New Zealand) Carmen Doran	Rae 86F	38	+ 2 laps	26
23	71	(New Zealand) Robin Judkins	Lola 644 E	38	+ 2 laps	30
24	45	(New Zealand) Jason Greer	Van Diemen RF86	37	+ 3 laps	28
Ret	11	(New Zealand) Ken Smith	Van Diemen Stealth	35	Retired	8
Ret	40	(New Zealand) Bruce Henley	Van Diemen RF92	35	Retired	12
Ret	37	(New Zealand) Stephen Heffernan	Van Diemen RF87	33	Retired	27
Ret	25	(New Zealand) Stan Redmond	Van Diemen RF92	32	Retired	21
Ret	75	(New Zealand) Munro Tall	Swift FB4	15	Retired	29
DNS	42	(New Zealand) Tony Graham	Swift SC92F		Did Not Start	
DNS	49	(New Zealand) Grant Campbell	Swift SC92F		Did Not Start	
DNS	70	(New Zealand) Jayant Singh	Van Diemen RF92		Did Not Start	

Preceded by 2002 New Zealand Grand Prix	New Zealand Grand Prix; 2003	Succeeded by 2004 New Zealand Grand Prix
