= 2001–02 New Zealand Formula Ford Championship =

Motor racing competition

The 2001–02 New Zealand Formula Ford Championship (known for commercial reasons as the 2001–02 Talley's New Zealand Formula Ford Championship) was a motor racing championship for drivers of Formula Ford racing cars. It was the 31st national series for Formula Fords to be held in New Zealand. The season began at Pukekohe Park Raceway on 10 November 2001 and concluded at Manfeild Autocourse on 14 April 2002.

Fabian Coulthard dominated the championship, winning 11 out of the 17 races on offer, to claim overall championship honours. He would also win the 2002 New Zealand Grand Prix that was run as part of the championship at the third round at Teretonga Park.

== Calendar ==
The following circuits hosted at lead one round of the 2001–02 championship.

Rnd	Circuit	Date	Map
2001			2001–02 New Zealand Formula Ford Championship is located in New Zealand
1	Pukekohe Park Raceway (Pukekohe, Auckland Region)	10–11 November	2001–02 New Zealand Formula Ford Championship is located in New Zealand
2	Manfeild Autocourse (Feilding, Manawatū District)	23–24 November	2001–02 New Zealand Formula Ford Championship is located in New Zealand
2002			2001–02 New Zealand Formula Ford Championship is located in New Zealand
3	Teretonga Park (Invercargill, Southland Region)	5–7 January	2001–02 New Zealand Formula Ford Championship is located in New Zealand
4	Timaru International Motor Raceway (Timaru, Canterbury Region)	12–13 January	2001–02 New Zealand Formula Ford Championship is located in New Zealand
5	Pukekohe Park Raceway (Pukekohe, Auckland Region)	19–20 January	2001–02 New Zealand Formula Ford Championship is located in New Zealand
6	Manfeild Autocourse (Feilding, Manawatū District)	2–3 February	2001–02 New Zealand Formula Ford Championship is located in New Zealand
7	Taupo Motorsport Park (Taupō, Waikato)	30–31 March	2001–02 New Zealand Formula Ford Championship is located in New Zealand
8	Manfeild Autocourse (Feilding, Manawatū District)	13–14 April	2001–02 New Zealand Formula Ford Championship is located in New Zealand

== Teams and drivers ==
Team	Vehicle	No.	Driver	Round
Higgins Architecture	Van Diemen RF94	4	(New Zealand) Andrew Higgins	All
Caltex Havoline	Van Diemen RF01	5	(New Zealand) Simon Richards	All
Dave Pope Transport	Van Diemen RF94	6	(New Zealand) Brady Kennett	All
Dewalt	Van Diemen RF90	7	(New Zealand) Simon Gamble	All
Ross Reid Ltd	Van Diemen RF94	9	(New Zealand) Jonny Reid	1–3, 7–8
The Head Shop	Van Diemen RF94	10	(New Zealand) Nelson Hartley	1–7
Ken Smith Motorsport	Van Diemen Stealth	11	(New Zealand) Ken Smith	1–7
Smith & Hartley Motorsport	Van Diemen Stealth	12	(New Zealand) Daniel Gaunt	1–5
Smith & Hartley Motorsport	Van Diemen Stealth	47	(New Zealand) Mathew Fitzgerald	1–2
AutoTrail	Van Diemen RF91	14	(New Zealand) Nick Ross	All
	Swift SC92	15	(New Zealand) Royce Bayer	3
	Swift FB91	17	(New Zealand) Gordon McIntyre	3
	Van Diemen RF96	18	(New Zealand) Ian Bisman	3
	Van Diemen RF92	21	(New Zealand) Todd Stewart	3
AMP	Spectrum 08	22	(New Zealand) Chris Pither	All
	Van Diemen RF92	25	(New Zealand) Stan Redmond	3
Edgell Performance Racing	Swift 96	26	(New Zealand) Tim Edgell	1–2, 5
	Van Diemen RF81	27	(New Zealand) Wayne Colville	3
	Lola 644G	30	(New Zealand) Ian Clements	3
Quicksilver Racing	Van Diemen RF92	31	(New Zealand) Nick Buxeda	1–2, 5–8
Canterbury Motor Racing School	Van Diemen Stealth	32	(United Kingdom) Mark Haswell	1–2
Team PSP	Van Diemen RF92	33	(Malaysia) Iskandar Syed	3–4
Team PSP	Van Diemen RF92	72	(Malaysia) Mashlino Buang	3–4, 6
Team PSP	Van Diemen RF92	83	(Malaysia) Fariqe Hairuman	3–4, 6
	Van Diemen RF90	34	(New Zealand) Steve Donaldson	3
	Van Diemen RF86	36	(New Zealand) Fred Hawthorne	3
Team USA Scholarship	Van Diemen RF93	39	(United States) A. J. Allmendinger	3–6
Team USA Scholarship	Van Diemen RF93	40	(United States) Bryan Sellers	3–6
Leitch Motorsport	Van Diemen	43	(New Zealand) Barry Leitch	3
	Crossle 55F	44	(New Zealand) Noel Atley	3
	Van Diemen Stealth	47	(New Zealand) David Payne	3
		47	(New Zealand) Ben Harford	6
	Swift FB89	53	(New Zealand) Robert Toshach	3
NZ Rent-A-Car	Van Diemen RF92	57	(New Zealand) Scott McKelvie	1–4, 6–8
Erotica	Van Diemen RF92	66	(New Zealand) Fabian Coulthard	All
Jayant Singh	Van Diemen RF92	70	(New Zealand) Jayant Singh	All
	Van Diemen RF89	71	(New Zealand) Robin Judkins	3
	Swift FB4	76	(New Zealand) Carl Wall	3–4
	Swift FB88	77	(New Zealand) Steve Edwards	3
	Van Diemen RF92	83	(New Zealand) Paul "PK" Kitto	6, 8
	Ray 86F	85	(New Zealand) Carmen Doran	3–4
	Reynard 84	86	(New Zealand) John Clegg	2–3
McDonalds	Spectrum	88	(New Zealand) Mathew Radisich	All
Racetech	Van Diemen RF94	96	(New Zealand) Karl Wilson	1–4
	Van Diemen RF91	99	(New Zealand) Matthew Hamilton	3

== Results and standings ==
=== Season summary ===
Rnd		Circuit	Pole position	Fastest Lap	Winning driver	Winning team
1	R1	Pukekohe Park Raceway (Pukekohe, Auckland)	(New Zealand) Brady Kennett	(New Zealand) Fabian Coulthard	(New Zealand) Fabian Coulthard	Erotica
1	R2	Pukekohe Park Raceway (Pukekohe, Auckland)		(New Zealand) Brady Kennett	(New Zealand) Fabian Coulthard	Erotica
1	R3	Pukekohe Park Raceway (Pukekohe, Auckland)		(New Zealand) Fabian Coulthard	(New Zealand) Fabian Coulthard	Erotica
2	R1	Manfeild Autocourse (Feilding, Manawatū District)	(New Zealand) Fabian Coulthard	(New Zealand) Fabian Coulthard	(New Zealand) Fabian Coulthard	Erotica
2	R2	Manfeild Autocourse (Feilding, Manawatū District)		(New Zealand) Simon Gamble	(New Zealand) Fabian Coulthard	Erotica
3	R1	Teretonga Park (Invercargill, Southland)	(New Zealand) Fabian Coulthard	(New Zealand) Fabian Coulthard	(New Zealand) Fabian Coulthard	Erotica
3	R2	Teretonga Park (Invercargill, Southland)		(New Zealand) Fabian Coulthard	(New Zealand) Fabian Coulthard	Erotica
4	R1	Timaru International Motor Raceway (Timaru, Canterbury)	(United States) A.J. Allmendinger	(United States) Bryan Sellers	(United States) Bryan Sellers	Team USA Scholarship
4	R2	Timaru International Motor Raceway (Timaru, Canterbury)		(New Zealand) Fabian Coulthard	(United States) Bryan Sellers	Team USA Scholarship
5	R1	Pukekohe Park Raceway (Pukekohe, Auckland)	(New Zealand) Brady Kennett	(United States) Bryan Sellers (Note: Fabian Coulthard had originally set the fastest lap but was later disqualified due to a techanical infringement)	(New Zealand) Brady Kennett (Note: Fabian Coulthard had originally won the race but was later disqualified due to a techanical infringement)	Dave Pope Transport
5	R2	Pukekohe Park Raceway (Pukekohe, Auckland)		(New Zealand) Nelson Hartley (Note: Fabian Coulthard had originally set the fastest lap but was later disqualified due to a techanical infringement)	(New Zealand) Nick Ross (Note: Fabian Coulthard had originally won the race but was later disqualified due to a techanical infringement)	AutoTrail
6	R1	Manfeild Autocourse (Feilding, Manawatū District)	(New Zealand) Ken Smith	(New Zealand) Nelson Hartley	(New Zealand) Fabian Coulthard	Erotica
6	R2	Manfeild Autocourse (Feilding, Manawatū District)		(New Zealand) Nelson Hartley	(New Zealand) Fabian Coulthard	Erotica
7	R1	Taupo Motorsport Park (Taupo, Waikato)	(New Zealand) Fabian Coulthard	(New Zealand) Simon Gamble	(New Zealand) Nick Ross	AutoTrail
7	R2	Taupo Motorsport Park (Taupo, Waikato)		(New Zealand) Fabian Coulthard	(New Zealand) Fabian Coulthard	Erotica
8	R1	Manfeild Autocourse (Feilding, Manawatū District)	(New Zealand) Fabian Coulthard	(New Zealand) Fabian Coulthard	(New Zealand) Fabian Coulthard	Erotica
8	R2	Manfeild Autocourse (Feilding, Manawatū District)		(New Zealand) Fabian Coulthard	(New Zealand) Fabian Coulthard	Erotica

=== Championship standings ===
Pos.	Driver	PUK1			MAN1		TER		TIM		PUK2		MAN2		TAU		MAN3		Points
Pos.	Driver	R1	R2	R3	R1	R2	R1	R2	R1	R2	R1	R2	R1	R1	R2	R1	R2	R2	Points
1	(New Zealand) Fabian Coulthard	1	1	1	1	1	1	1	2	2	DSQ	DSQ	1	1	4	1	1	1	471
2	(New Zealand) Brady Kennett	8	2	2	3	3	8	11	6	5	1	5	4	4	8	Ret	3	6	315
3	(New Zealand) Nick Ross	11	Ret	4	4	4	6	7	8	9	5	1	8	3	1	11	2	2	307
4	(New Zealand) Simon Richards	2	4	3	9	Ret	3	5	7	10	8	8	5	5	7	6	Ret	5	258
5	(New Zealand) Nelson Hartley	Ret	6	DNS	6	8	Ret	6	4	3	7	3	2	2	6	4			234
6	(New Zealand) Simon Gamble	Ret	10	6	2	2	7	Ret	12	8	6	6	Ret	DNS	2	2	4	Ret	225
7	(New Zealand) Chris Pither	6	7	5	5	6	Ret	10	9	13	10	9	6	7	3	Ret	Ret	4	225
8	(New Zealand) Ken Smith	7	Ret	DNS	11	7	2	4	5	4	3	Ret	7	Ret	DNS	3			184
9	(United States) Bryan Sellers						4	2	1	1	2	2	Ret	Ret					167
10	(New Zealand) Daniel Gaunt	5	5	7	Ret	9	11	9	3	6	9	7							149
11	(United States) A.J. Allmendinger						5	3	Ret	7	4	4	3	6					135
12	(New Zealand) Jonny Reid	4	Ret	9	7	5	DNS	DNS							5	10	6	3	132
13	(New Zealand) Jayant Singh	12	12	Ret	Ret	11	DNS	Ret	16	14	DNS	12	11	11	10	7	7	9	124
13	(New Zealand) Scott McKelvie	Ret	14	10	14	12	12	14	DNS	DNS			9	DNS	9	5	5	7	124
15	(New Zealand) Nick Buxeda	Ret	13	11	12	10					13	11	13	9	12	9	8	8	123
15	(New Zealand) Andrew Higgins	13	Ret	DNS	15	13	DNS	Ret	14	15	12	13	12	12	11	8	9	10	123
17	(New Zealand) Karl Wilson	9	9	Ret	10	Ret	10	12	11	11									75
18	(New Zealand) Mathew Radisich	14	Ret	12	Ret	16	27	Ret	Ret	Ret	14	14	15	DNS	Ret	12	11	11	73
19	(United Kingdom) Mark Haswell	3	3	DNS	8	Ret													59
20	(New Zealand) Tim Edgell	10	11	Ret	13	14					11	10							57
21	(New Zealand) Carl Wall						13	16	10	12									33
22	(Malaysia) Fariqe Hairuman						Ret	Ret	13	18			10	10					33
23	(New Zealand) Matt Fitzgerald	Ret	8	8	16	Ret													31
24	(New Zealand) Paul Kitto												14	DNS			10	12	27
25	(New Zealand) Todd Stewart						9	8											25
26	(New Zealand) John Clegg				Ret	15	26	25											17
27	(New Zealand) Ben Harford												16	8					13
27	(New Zealand) Steven Donaldson						14	15											13
29	(New Zealand) Carmen Doran						20	23	15	17									11
30	(New Zealand) Royce Bayer						16	17											9
31	(New Zealand) David Payne						28	13											8
31	(Malaysia) Mashlino Buang						21	Ret	18	16			Ret	DNS					8
33	(New Zealand) Robert Toshach						17	18											7
34	(New Zealand) Matthew Hamilton						15	22											6
35	(Malaysia) Iskander Syed						23	Ret	17	Ret									4
36	(New Zealand) Ian Clements						18	Ret											3
37	(New Zealand) Ian Bisman						19	21											2
37	(New Zealand) Noel Atley						24	19											2
39	(New Zealand) Stan Redmond						22	20											1
	(New Zealand) Steve Edwards						25	24											0
	(New Zealand) Fred Hawthorne						29	26											0
	(New Zealand) Wayne Colville						Ret	DNS											0
	(New Zealand) Barry Leitch						Ret	Ret											0
	(New Zealand) Gordon McIntyre						Ret	DNS											0
	(New Zealand) Robin Judkins						DNS	Ret											0
	(New Zealand) Steve Donaldson						14	15											0
Pos.	Driver	R1	R2	R3	R1	R2	R1	R2	R1	R2	R1	R2	R1	R1	R2	R1	R2	R2	Points
Pos.	Driver	PUK1			MAN1		TER		TIM		PUK2		MAN2		TAU		MAN3		Points
