= 2006 New Zealand Grand Prix =

- Race 3, Round 3 of 8 of the 2006 Toyota Racing Series

Race details
- Date: 16 January 2006
- Official name: LI New Zealand Grand Prix
- Location: Teretonga Park, Feilding, New Zealand
- Course: Permanent racing facility
- Course length: 2.57 km (1.59 miles)
- Distance: 34 laps, 87.38 km (54.06 miles)
- Weather: Light rain

Pole position
| Driver | (United Kingdom) Jay Howard | Mark Petch Motorsport |
- Time: 0:55.432

Fastest lap
| Driver | (New Zealand) Andy Knight | Knight Motorsport |
- Time: 1:01.545 on lap 30

Podium
| First | (Bahrain) Hamad Al Fardan | Team Meritus |
| Second | (New Zealand) Daniel Gaunt | International Motorsport |
| Third | (New Zealand) Brendon Hartley | Victory Motorsport |

The 2006 New Zealand Grand Prix event for open wheel racing cars was held at Teretonga Park, near Invercargill on 15 January 2006. It was the fifty first New Zealand Grand Prix and was the first iteration to utilise Toyota Racing Series cars (based on international Formula 3 regulations). The event was also the third race of the third round of the 2005–06 Toyota Racing Series.

Held in damp conditions, the race was won by Hamad Al Fardan after Andy Knight was disqualified after failing to head mechanical black flag warnings over a faulty rain light. In doing so, Al Fardan became the first international driver to win the New Zealand Grand Prix since Dean Hall in 1989.

== Race report ==
Owing to the damp conditions, the standing start was scrapped in lieu of a single-file rolling start. Jay Howard led the field away from Chris van der Drift and Ben Harford. It was a tricky start for Harford, who spun twice in the opening stages, including one that left him stranded across the track at the final corner. Brendon Hartley took to the runoff in an evasive maneuver, but an unsighted Al Fardan failed to react in time and made like light contact with Harford, damaging the Bahraini's front wing.

The conditions continued to catch out drivers throughout the field, including race leader Howard, who speared off into the gravel trap at turn one. Second place driver, van der Drift, run wide just meters later and made contact with the wall. This ended both drivers' race and brought out the safety car. When the race resumed, Daniel Gaunt led from teammate Dale Williams. Despite suffering from a skewed front wing angle, Al Fardan began to set the pace and passed Hartley promptly for fourth place. Knight passed Gaunt for the lead around the outside of turn one, however he would be shown a mechanical black flag for a faulty rain light and was obligated to retreat to the pitlane.

Knight continued to ignore the black flags right until the finish. As a result, Knight was disqualified from the race and Al Fardan was declared the winner of the Grand Prix. Gaunt finished second and Hartley rounded out the podium.

=== Race classification ===
| Pos | No | Driver | Car | Laps | Time | Grid |
|---|---|---|---|---|---|---|
| 1 | 38 | (Bahrain) Hamad Al Fardan | Team Meritus | 34 | 48min 21.566sec | 7 |
| 2 | 47 | (New Zealand) Daniel Gaunt | International Motorsport | 34 | + 1.154 s | 5 |
| 3 | 28 | (New Zealand) Brendon Hartley | Victory Motorsport | 34 | + 1.406 s | 8 |
| 4 | 20 | (New Zealand) Daynom Templeman | Kiwi American Racing | 34 | + 1.764 s | 10 |
| 5 | 5 | (New Zealand) Marc Doran | Auto Motion | 34 | + 4.152 s | 9 |
| 6 | 87 | (New Zealand) Ben Crighton | Ben Crighton Racing | 34 | + 6.446 s | 13 |
| 7 | 9 | (New Zealand) Matthew Hamilton | Karcher Racing | 34 | + 7.034 s | 16 |
| 8 | 15 | (New Zealand) Marc Williams | Victory Motorsport | 34 | + 13.975 s | 11 |
| 9 | 4 | (New Zealand) Andrew Higgins | Motorsport Solutions | 34 | + 14.184 s | 14 |
| 10 | 76 | (New Zealand) Duane Spurdle | Spurdle Motorsport | 34 | + 18.312 s | 15 |
| 11 | 55 | (New Zealand) Christina Orr | Mark Petch Motorsport | 34 | + 18.760 s | 12 |
| 12 | 66 | (New Zealand) Hamish Cross | ESWA Racing | 34 | + 45.230 s | 17 |
| 13 | 7 | (New Zealand) Ben Harford | Cobra Vehicle Security | 33 | + 1 lap | 3 |
| 14 | 48 | (New Zealand) Dale Williams | International Motorsport | 33 | + 1 lap | 4 |
| Ret | 6 | (New Zealand) Jayant Singh | Jayant Singh Motorsport | 15 | Retired | 18 |
| Ret | 40 | (New Zealand) Mark Munro | Auto Motion | 9 | Retired | 19 |
| Ret | 22 | (United Kingdom) Jay Howard | Mark Petch Motorsport | 8 | Spun off | 1 |
| Ret | 70 | (New Zealand) Chris van der Drift | International Motorsport | 8 | Accident | 2 |
| DNS | 11 | (New Zealand) Ken Smith | Ken Smith Racing | 0 | Did Not Start | |
| DSQ | 97 | (New Zealand) Andy Knight | Knight Motorsport | 34 | Disqualified | 6 |
Fastest Lap: Andy Knight (Knight Motorsport) on lap 30 – 1:01.545

| Preceded by 2005 New Zealand Grand Prix | New Zealand Grand Prix; 2006 | Succeeded by 2007 New Zealand Grand Prix |
