= 2004 New Zealand Grand Prix =

- 49th New Zealand Grand Prix

Race details
- Date: 18 January 2004
- Location: Teretonga Park, Feilding, New Zealand
- Course: Permanent racing facility
- Course length: 2.57 km (1.59 miles)
- Distance: 38 laps, 102.8 km (63.6 miles)
- Weather: Fine

Pole position
Driver	(New Zealand) Tim Edgell	Van Diemen/Stealth RF94
- Time: 1:03.004

Fastest lap
Driver	(New Zealand) Ken Smith	Van Diemen/Stealth Evo 2
- Time: 1:02.889

Podium
First	(New Zealand) Ken Smith	Van Diemen/Stealth Evo 2
Second	(New Zealand) Andy Knight	Van Diemen/Stealth RF94
Third	(New Zealand) Tim Edgell	Van Diemen RF03

The 2004 New Zealand Grand Prix was an open wheel racing car race held at Teretonga Park, near Invercargill on 18 January 2004. It was the 49th New Zealand Grand Prix and was open to Formula Ford cars.

The event was won by Ken Smith who, at the age of 63 became the oldest winner of a Grand Prix in the world. He was followed closely by Andy Knight, crossing the line by one seven-thousandths of a second - the closest finish in New Zealand Grand Prix history. Tim Edgell rounded out the podium, having secured pole position earlier that weekend.

== Classification ==
=== Qualifying (Top 10 Shootout) ===
Pos	No.	Driver	Car	Time	Grid
1	26	(New Zealand) Tim Edgell	Van Diemen RF03	1:03.004	1
2	56	(New Zealand) Phil Hellebrekers	Spectrum 010	1:03.065	2
3	8	(New Zealand) Simon Gamble	Spectrum 010	1:03.172	3
4	11	(New Zealand) Ken Smith	Van Diemen/Stealth Evo 2	1:03.446	4
5	22	(New Zealand) Chris Pither		1:03.500	5
6	46	(United States) Charlie Kimball	Van Diemen/Stealth RF94	1:03.553	6
7	28	(New Zealand) Brendon Hartley		1:03.584	7
8	45	(United States) Ryan Millen	Van Diemen/Stealth RF94	1:03.692	8
9	9	(New Zealand) Marc Doran		1:03.838	9
10	2	(New Zealand) Simon Richards	Van Diemen RF02	1:03.850	10

=== Race ===
Pos	No.	Driver	Car	Laps	Time	Grid
1	11	(New Zealand) Ken Smith	Van Diemen/Stealth Evo 2	38	1hr 05min 58.783sec	4
2	97	(New Zealand) Andy Knight	Van Diemen/Stealth RF94	38	+ 0.007 s	12
3	26	(New Zealand) Tim Edgell	Van Diemen RF03	38	+ 1.332 s	1
4	87	(New Zealand) Ben Crighton	Van Diemen/Stealth RF94	38	+ 4.560 s	13
5	55	(New Zealand) Christina Orr	Van Diemen/Stealth RF94	38	+ 4.916 s	14
6	4	(New Zealand) Andrew Higgins	Van Diemen/Stealth RF94	38	+ 5.840 s	16
7	88	(New Zealand) Mathew Radisich		38		15
8	57	(New Zealand) Scott McKelvie		38		17
9	46	(United States) Charlie Kimball	Van Diemen/Stealth RF94	38	+ 16.301 s	6
10	12	(New Zealand) Russell Hartley		38		20
11	44	(New Zealand) Noel Atley		38		21
12	37	(New Zealand) Stephen Heffernan		38		22
13	85	(New Zealand) Carmen Doran		38		23
14	35	(New Zealand) James Mitchell		37	+ 1 lap	24
15	36	(New Zealand) Kurt Peterson		31	+ 7 laps	18
Ret	71	(New Zealand) Robin Judkins		36	Retired	25
Ret	2	(New Zealand) Simon Richards	Van Diemen RF02	24	Retired	10
Ret	70	(New Zealand) Jayant Singh		23	Retired	26
Ret	22	(New Zealand) Chris Pither		12	Retired	5
Ret	28	(New Zealand) Brendon Hartley		11	Retired	7
Ret	8	(New Zealand) Simon Gamble	Spectrum 010	11	Retired	3
Ret	56	(New Zealand) Phil Hellebrekers	Spectrum 010	6	Retired	2
Ret	19	(Malaysia) Mohammed Syahrizal		2	Retired	27
DNS	9	(New Zealand) Marc Doran			Did Not Start	9
DNS	19	(New Zealand) Jono Lester			Did Not Start	19
DNS	45	(United States) Ryan Millen	Van Diemen/Stealth RF94		Did Not Start	8
DNS	77	(New Zealand) Steve Edwards			Did Not Start	28
DNS	47	(United States) Joe D'Agostino	Van Diemen/Stealth RF94		Did Not Start	11

Preceded by 2003 New Zealand Grand Prix	New Zealand Grand Prix; 2004	Succeeded by 2005 New Zealand Grand Prix
