= 2003 Australian Drivers' Championship =

Motor racing competition

Seasons
- ← 2002 2004 →

The 2003 Australian Drivers' Championship was a CAMS sanctioned national motor racing title for drivers of cars conforming to Formula 4000 regulations. The title was contested over a six-round, twelve race series which was promoted as the 2003 Holden Australian Drivers' Championship for the CAMS Gold Star. It was the 47th Australian Drivers' Championship.

New Zealander Daniel Gaunt won the championship driving three different Reynards for two different teams over the course of the season. Gaunt only won two of the twelve races but achieved a race finishing consistency his rivals lacked and finished eight points ahead of his nearest rivals. Second place was tied between Jonny Reid and Paul Trengove, both driving Reynards.

Apart from the seven wins claimed by Gaunt and Reid, three wins were taken by another New Zealander, Nelson Hartley (Reynard 94D & Reynard 97D), and two wins by Ricky Occhipinti (Reynard 97D and 98D).

== Teams and drivers ==
Entrant	Chassis	No	Drivers	Rounds
Greg Murphy Racing	Reynard 94D	4	(Australia) Peter Hill	6
Fremder Automotive	Reynard 92D	5	(Australia) Simon Kane	6
Ralt Australia	Reynard 90D	10	(Australia) Brett Campbell	1
Ralt Australia	Reynard 94D	11	(New Zealand) Nelson Hartley	1
Ralt Australia	Reynard 94D	11	(Australia) Michael Caruso	2
Ralt Australia	Reynard 94D	11	(Australia) Christian Jones	3
Ralt Australia	Reynard 94D	11	(New Zealand) Ken Smith	4
Ralt Australia	Reynard 94D	11	(New Zealand) Daniel Gaunt	5–6
Ralt Australia	Reynard 96D	12	(New Zealand) Jonny Reid	All
Mantis Racing	Reynard 96D	17	(Australia) Mark Ellis	4
Mantis Racing	Reynard 96D	17	(Australia) Michael Joannou	5–6
Peters Racing	Reynard 91D	24	(Australia) Ian Peters	All
The Family Car Centre	Reynard 92D	27	(Australia) Terry Clearihan	All
Listec Racing	Reynard	31	(Australia) Ryan Campbell	6
Formula Uno Racing	Reynard 97D	32	(Australia) Ricky Occhipinti	All
CPA Australia	Reynard 95D	34	(Australia) Paul Trengove	2–6
ARLEC	Reynard 92D	49	(Australia) Rohan Carrig	All
Pure Power Racing	Reynard 92D	69	(New Zealand) Daniel Gaunt	1–2
Pure Power Racing	Reynard 92D	69	(Australia) Chris Hocking	3
Pure Power Racing	Reynard 96D	76	(New Zealand) Daniel Gaunt	3–4
Hocking Motorsport	Reynard 97D	74	(Japan) Akihiro Asai	1
Hocking Motorsport	Reynard 97D	74	(Australia) Darren Hossack	4
Hocking Motorsport	Reynard 97D	74	(New Zealand) Ken Smith	5
Hocking Motorsport	Reynard 97D	74	(Australia) Derek Pingel	6
Hocking Motorsport	Reynard 97D	75	(United States) Mikel Miller	1
Hocking Motorsport	Reynard 97D	75	(New Zealand) Nelson Hartley	2–6
Hocking Motorsport	Reynard 97D	76	(United States) Mikel Miller	2

== Race calendar ==
The 2003 Australian Drivers' Championship was contested over a six-round series with two races per round.

Round		Circuit	Date	Pole position	Fastest lap	Winning driver	Winning team
1	R1	Wakefield Park Raceway; Goulburn, New South Wales	21–23 February	(Japan) Akihiro Asai	(New Zealand) Jonny Reid	(Australia) Ricky Occhipinti	Hocking Motorsport
1	R2	Wakefield Park Raceway; Goulburn, New South Wales	21–23 February		(New Zealand) Jonny Reid	(New Zealand) Jonny Reid	Ralt Australia
2	R1	Winton Motor Raceway (Benalla, Victoria)	23–25 May	(New Zealand) Jonny Reid	(New Zealand) Jonny Reid	(Australia) Ricky Occhipinti	Hocking Motorsport
2	R2	Winton Motor Raceway (Benalla, Victoria)	23–25 May		(Australia) Ricky Occhipinti	(New Zealand) Nelson Hartley	Hocking Motorsport
3	R1	Phillip Island Grand Prix Circuit (Phillip Island, Victoria)	4–6 July	(Australia) Ricky Occhipinti	(New Zealand) Nelson Hartley	(New Zealand) Nelson Hartley	Hocking Motorsport
3	R2	Phillip Island Grand Prix Circuit (Phillip Island, Victoria)	4–6 July		(New Zealand) Daniel Gaunt	(New Zealand) Nelson Hartley	Hocking Motorsport
4	R1	Winton Motor Raceway (Benalla, Victoria)	1–3 August	(New Zealand) Jonny Reid	(New Zealand) Jonny Reid	(New Zealand) Jonny Reid	Ralt Australia
4	R2	Winton Motor Raceway (Benalla, Victoria)	1–3 August		(New Zealand) Jonny Reid	(New Zealand) Jonny Reid	Ralt Australia
5	R1	Mallala Motor Sport Park (Mallala, South Australia)	29–31 August	(New Zealand) Jonny Reid	(New Zealand) Jonny Reid	(New Zealand) Daniel Gaunt	Ralt Australia
5	R2	Mallala Motor Sport Park (Mallala, South Australia)	29–31 August		(Australia) Paul Trengove	(New Zealand) Daniel Gaunt	Ralt Australia
6	R1	Eastern Creek International Raceway (Eastern Creek, New South Wales)	28–30 November	(New Zealand) Jonny Reid	(New Zealand) Jonny Reid	(New Zealand) Jonny Reid	Ralt Australia
6	R2	Eastern Creek International Raceway (Eastern Creek, New South Wales)	28–30 November		(New Zealand) Jonny Reid	(New Zealand) Jonny Reid	Ralt Australia

== Points system ==
Championship points were awarded on a 20–15–12–10–8–6–4–3–2–1 basis for the first ten positions in each race.

The round winner for each round was determined by the aggregation of championship points awarded in that round. Where more than one driver had been awarded equal points, the round result was determined by the placings in Race 2.

== Results ==
					Wakefield Park		Winton		Phillip Island		Winton		Mallala		Eastern Creek		
Position	Driver	No	Car	Entrant	Race 1	Race 2	Race 1	Race 2	Race 1	Race 2	Race 1	Race 2	Race 1	Race 2	Race 1	Race 2	Total
1	Daniel Gaunt	69 & 12	Reynard 92D, 96D & 94D Holden	Pure Power Racing & Ralt Australia	8	8	6	10	8	15	15	-	20	20	15	15	140
2	Jonny Reid	12	Reynard 96D Holden	Ralt Australia	12	20	-	-	10	-	20	20	10	-	20	20	132
2	Paul Trengove	34	Reynard 95D Holden	CPA Australia	-	-	15	15	12	12	12	15	12	15	12	12	132
4	Ricky Occhipinti	32	Reynard 97D & 98D Holden	Formula Uno Racing	20	12	20	8	-	-	10	12	15	12	8	8	125
5	Nelson Hartley	11 & 75	Reynard 94D & 97D Holden	Ralt Australia & Hocking Motorsport	15	15	8	20	20	20	-	-	-	-	-	6	104
6	Ian Peters	24	Reynard 91D Holden	EDS	10	6	4	6	-	6	6	8	3	8	10	4	71
7	Terry Clearihan	27	Reynard 92D Holden	National Neon Signs Canberra	6	-	10	-	15	10	-	6	-	10	6	-	63
8	Rohan Carrig	49	Reynard 92D Holden	Arlec / CRD Motorsport	-	4	-	4	6	8	-	-	6	6	3	2	39
9	Mikel Miller	75	Reynard 97D Holden	Hocking Motorsport	-	10	12	-	-	-	-	-	-	-	-	-	22
10	Darren Hossack	74	Reynard Holden	Hocking Motorsport	-	-	-	-	-	-	8	10	-	-	-	-	18
11	Michael Caruso	11	Reynard Holden	Ralt Australia	-	-	-	12	-	-	-	-	-	-	-	-	12
12	Michael Joannou	17	Reynard 96D Holden	Mantis Racing	-	-	-	-	-	-	-	-	4	-	4	3	11
13	Peter Hill	4	Reynard 94D Holden	Greg Murphy Racing	-	-	-	-	-	-	-	-	-	-	-	10	10
14	Mark Ellis	17	Reynard Holden	Mantis Racing	-	-	-	-	-	-	3	4	-	-	-	-	7
15	Ken Smith	11	Reynard 97D Holden	Ralt Australia	-	-	-	-	-	-	4	-	-	-	-	-	4

Note: All cars were required to be fitted with a 3.8-litre Holden V6 engine.

=== Silver Star ===
Position	Driver	No	Car	Entrant	Points
1	Ian Peters	24	Reynard 91D Holden	EDS	197
2	Terry Clearihan	27	Reynard 92D Holden	National Neon Signs Canberra	125
3	Rohan Carrig	49	Reynard 92D Holden	Arlec / CRD Motorsport	117

Note: Approved competitors were awarded points towards a Silver Star Trophy based on their finishing positions in each race relative to other such nominated competitors. These points had no reflection on the Australian Drivers' Championship classification.

=== Yokohama Rookie of the Year Award ===
The Yokohama Rookie of the Year Award was won by Daniel Gaunt. The award was open to drivers who had contested less than two races for the Australian Drivers' Championship since 1989.
