= 2002 New Zealand Grand Prix =

- 47th New Zealand Grand Prix

Race details
- Date: 13 January 2002
- Official name: XLVII New Zealand Grand Prix
- Location: Teretonga Park, Feilding, New Zealand
- Course: Permanent racing facility
- Course length: 2.57 km (1.59 miles)
- Distance: 40 laps, 102.8 km (63.6 miles)
- Weather: Fine

Pole position
Driver	(New Zealand) Fabian Coulthard	Van Diemen RF94
- Time: 1:02.891

Fastest lap
Driver	(New Zealand) Fabian Coulthard	Van Diemen RF94
- Time: 1:02.418 on lap 5

Podium
First	(New Zealand) Fabian Coulthard	Van Diemen RF94
Second	(United States) Bryan Sellers	Van Diemen RF93
Third	(United States) A. J. Allmendinger	Van Diemen RF93

The 2002 New Zealand Grand Prix (officially known as the 2002 P&O Nedlloyd New Zealand Grand Prix) was an open wheel racing car race held at Teretonga Park, near Invercargill on 13 January 2002. This event marked the first time the New Zealand Grand Prix was run using Formula Ford machinery. It also served as the fourth round of the 2001–02 New Zealand Formula Ford Championship and was held over two 18-lap segments.

The race was won by Fabian Coulthard in dominant fashion. The podium was completed by the two Team USA Scholarship drivers, Bryan Sellers and A. J. Allmendinger.

== Race report ==
Coulthard was virtually untouchable in the New Zealand Formula Ford Championship that season, having won every race in the series up to that point. In Teretonga, he continued that form by qualifying fastest in provisional qualifying and then topping the timesheets in the top-ten shootout session; both by some margin. Veteran Ken Smith was the closest competitor followed by Team USA Scholarship driver, Sellers. The Team USA Scholarship drivers of Sellers and Allmendinger were flown in to New Zealand a few days beforehand as part of a program organised by Jeremy Shaw and run by Kiwi John Crawford.

Unlike previous iterations of the event, the cars used for the marquee event were not equipped with fuel tanks large enough to cover the full distance of the race. Thus, the race was split up into two 18-lap segments, with the cars refueled in between. Any other modifications made to the cars in this time were prohibited. The second part of the race was then started under safety car. Coulthard led the opening portion of the race from Sellers, Allmendinger, Nicolas Ross, Simon Gamble, Simon Richards and Smith.

In the second portion of the race, Allmendinger, Ross and Gamble came to blows at turn one which forced Ross to climb back up the order and threw Gamble out of the race. Brady Kennett, winner of the 1995 event, struggled with oil pressure and would eventually have to settle for eleventh place. One of the biggest movers of the field was Nelson Hartley, brother of Formula One driver Brendon, who had climbed from 29th on the grid to finish sixth. Of all the cars however, it was Coulthard who reigned supreme. Taking the chequered flag to win the Grand Prix nearly four seconds ahead of Sellers, completing the race in just under an hour. Allmendinger recovered from his conflict with Ross and Gamble to take a consolatory third.

== Classification ==
=== Qualifying ===
Pos	No	Driver	Car	Q1	Q2	Grid
1	66	(New Zealand) Fabian Coulthard	Stealth Van Diemen RF94	1:02.553	1:02.891	1
2	11	(New Zealand) Ken Smith	Van Diemen Stealth	1:03.071	1:03.394	2
3	40	(United States) Bryan Sellers	Van Diemen RF93	1:03.062	1:03.641	3
4	10	(New Zealand) Nelson Hartley	Van Diemen RF94	1:03.090	1:03.675	4
5	5	(New Zealand) Simon Richards	Van Diemen RF01	1:03.326	1:03.706	5
6	39	(United States) A. J. Allmendinger	Van Diemen RF93	1:03.248	1:03.916	6
7	22	(New Zealand) Chris Pither	Spectrum 08	1:03.114	1:03.950	7
8	14	(New Zealand) Nick Ross	Van Diemen RF91	1:03.134	1:04.009	8
9	7	(New Zealand) Simon Gamble	Van Diemen RF90	1:03.245	1:04.186	9
10	6	(New Zealand) Brady Kennett	Van Diemen RF94	1:03.071	1:04.413	10
11	21	(New Zealand) Todd Stewart	Van Diemen RF92	1:03.878		11
12	12	(New Zealand) Daniel Gaunt	Van Diemen Stealth	1:04.295		12
13	57	(New Zealand) Scott McKelvie	Van Diemen RF92	1:04.363		13
14	47	(New Zealand) David Payne	Van Diemen Stealth	1:04.509		14
15	96	(New Zealand) Karl Wilson	Van Diemen RF94	1:04.707		15
16	76	(New Zealand) Carl Wall	Swift FB4	1:04.901		16
17	34	(New Zealand) Steve Donaldson	Van Diemen RF90	1:05.147		17
18	4	(New Zealand) Andrew Higgins	Van Diemen RF94	1:05.195		18
19	25	(New Zealand) Stan Redmond	Van Diemen RF92	1:05.506		19
20	70	(New Zealand) Jayant Singh	Van Diemen RF92	1:05.569		20
21	18	(New Zealand) Ian Bisman	Van Diemen RF96	1:05.684		21
22	15	(New Zealand) Royce Bayer	Swift SC92	1:06.065		22
23	72	(Malaysia) Mashlino Buang	Van Diemen RF92	1:06.139		23
24	33	(Malaysia) Iskander Syed	Van Diemen RF92	1:06.164		24
25	53	(New Zealand) Robert Toshach	Swift FB89	1:06.179		25
26	30	(New Zealand) Ian Clements	Lola 644G	1:06.315		26
27	86	(New Zealand) John Clegg	Reynard 84FF	1:06.394		27
28	85	(New Zealand) Carmen Doran	Ray 86F	1:06.478		28
29	77	(New Zealand) Steve Edwards	Swift FB88	1:07.017		29
30	88	(New Zealand) Mathew Radisich	Spectrum 08	1:07.213		30
31	43	(New Zealand) Barry Leitch	Van Diemen	1:07.305		31
32	27	(New Zealand) Wayne Colville	Van Diemen RF81	1:09.792		32
33	44	(New Zealand) Noel Atley	Crossle 55F	1:10.548		33
34	71	(New Zealand) Robin Judkins	Van Diemen RF89	1:10.565		34
35	36	(New Zealand) Fred Hawthorne	Van Diemen RF86	1:11.054		35
36	83	(Malaysia) Fariqe Hairuman	Van Diemen RF92	1:12.781		36
-	99	(New Zealand) Matthew Hamilton	Van Diemen RF91	no time		

=== Race ===
Pos	No	Driver	Car	Laps	Time	Grid
1	66	(New Zealand) Fabian Coulthard	Stealth Van Diemen RF94	36	59min 07.569sec	1
2	40	(United States) Bryan Sellers	Van Diemen RF93	36	+ 3.714 s	3
3	39	(United States) A. J. Allmendinger	Van Diemen RF93	36	+ 8.834 s	6
4	11	(New Zealand) Ken Smith	Stealth Van Diemen	36	+ 11.252 s	2
5	5	(New Zealand) Simon Richards	Van Diemen RF01	36	+ 16.634 s	5
6	10	(New Zealand) Nelson Hartley	Van Diemen RF94	36	+ 17.328 s	4
7	14	(New Zealand) Nick Ross	Van Diemen RF91	36	+ 19.462 s	8
8	21	(New Zealand) Todd Stewart	Stealth Van Diemen	36	+ 21.338 s	11
9	12	(New Zealand) Daniel Gaunt	Stealth Van Diemen	36	+ 22.119 s	12
10	22	(New Zealand) Chris Pither	Spectrum 08	36	+ 22.231 s	7
11	6	(New Zealand) Brady Kennett	Van Diemen RF94	36	+ 22.879 s	10
12	96	(New Zealand) Karl Wilson	Van Diemen RF94	36	+ 22.903 s	15
13	47	(New Zealand) David Payne	Stealth Van Diemen	36	+ 42.852 s	14
14	57	(New Zealand) Scott McKelvie	Van Diemen RF92	36	+ 42.921 s	13
15	34	(New Zealand) Steven Donaldson	Van Diemen RF90	36	+ 53.748 s	17
16	76	(New Zealand) Carl Wall	Swift FB87	36	+ 53.934 s	16
17	15	(New Zealand) Royce Bayer	Swift SC92F	35	+ 1 lap	22
18	53	(New Zealand) Robert Toshach	Swift FB89	35	+ 1 lap	25
19	44	(New Zealand) Noel Atley	Crossle 55F	35	+ 1 lap	33
20	25	(New Zealand) Stan Redmond	Van Diemen RF92	35	+ 1 lap	19
21	18	(New Zealand) Ian Bisman	Van Diemen RF96	35	+ 1 lap	21
22	99	(New Zealand) Matthew Hamilton	Van Diemen RF91	35	+ 1 lap	PL
23	85	(New Zealand) Carmen Doran	Van Diemen RF96	34	+ 2 laps	28
24	77	(New Zealand) Steve Edwards	Swift FB88	34	+ 2 laps	29
25	86	(New Zealand) John Clegg	Reynard 84FF	34	+ 2 laps	27
26	36	(New Zealand) Fred Hawthorne	Van Diemen RF86	33	+ 3 laps	35
27	30	(New Zealand) Ian Clements	Lola 644G	30	+ 6 laps	26
Ret	72	(Malaysia) Mashlino Buang	Van Diemen RF92	30	Retired	23
Ret	88	(New Zealand) Mathew Radisich	Spectrum 010	26	Retired	30
Ret	7	(New Zealand) Simon Gamble	Van Diemen RF90	24	Accident	9
Ret	71	(New Zealand) Robin Judkins	Van Diemen RF89	19	Retired	34
Ret	4	(New Zealand) Andrew Higgins	Van Diemen RF94	17	Retired	18
Ret	43	(New Zealand) Barry Leitch	Van Diemen	12	Retired	31
Ret	33	(Malaysia) Iskander Syed	Van Diemen RF92	5	Retired	24
Ret	70	(New Zealand) Jayant Singh	Van Diemen RF92	3	Retired	20
Ret	83	(Malaysia) Fariqe Hairuman	Van Diemen RF92	2	Retired	36
DNS	9	(New Zealand) Jonny Reid	Van Diemen RF94		Did Not Start	
DNS	17	(New Zealand) Gordon McIntyre	Swift FB91		Did Not Start	

Preceded by 2000 New Zealand Grand Prix	New Zealand Grand Prix; 2002	Succeeded by 2003 New Zealand Grand Prix
