= 2007 New Zealand Grand Prix =

- Race 3, Round 7 of 8 of the 2006–07 Toyota Racing Series

Race details
- Date: 13 January 2007
- Official name: LII New Zealand Grand Prix
- Location: Teretonga Park, Invercargill, New Zealand
- Course: Permanent racing facility
- Course length: 2.57 km (1.59 miles)
- Distance: 40 laps, 102.8 km (63.6 miles)

Pole position
Driver	(New Zealand) Daniel Gaunt	International Motorsport
- Time: 0:54.726

Fastest lap
Driver	(New Zealand) Daniel Gaunt	International Motorsport
- Time: 0:55.274

Podium
First	(New Zealand) Daniel Gaunt	International Motorsport
Second	(New Zealand) Matthew Hamilton	ESWA Racing
Third	(New Zealand) Daynom Templeman	Zenith Racing

The 2007 New Zealand Grand Prix was an open wheel racing car race held at Teretonga Park, near Invercargill on 11 March 2007.

It was the fifty second New Zealand Grand Prix and was open to Toyota Racing Series cars (based on international Formula 3 regulations). The event was also the third race of the seventh round of the 2006–07 Toyota Racing Series.

== Classification ==
=== Qualifying ===
Pos	No.	Driver	Team	Qual 1	Qual 2	Grid
1	1	(New Zealand) Daniel Gaunt	International Motorsport	0.55.243	0.54.726	1
2	7	(New Zealand) Ben Harford	Auto Motion	0.55.400	0.54.788	2
3	45	(New Zealand) Matthew Hamilton	ESWA Racing	0.55.380	0.54.970	3
4	3	(New Zealand) Andy Knight	Knight Motorsport	0.55.107	0.55.017	4
5	97	(New Zealand) Shane van Gisbergen	International Motorsport	0.55.438	0.55.028	5
6	20	(New Zealand) Daynom Templeman	Zenith Racing	0.55.478	0.55.107	6
7	72	(Australia) David Besnard		0.55.138	0.57.220	7
8	5	(New Zealand) Dominic Storey	Auto Motion	0.55.695	0.55.300	8
9	9	(New Zealand) Nic Jordan	Auto Motion	0.55.364	0.55.466	9
10	40	(New Zealand) Mark Munro	Auto Motion	0.55.673	0.55.657	10
11	11	(New Zealand) Ken Smith	Ken Smith Motorsport	0.55.720		11
12	42	(Australia) Leanne Tander	European Technique	0.55.758		12
13	55	(New Zealand) Christina Orr	Mark Petch Motorsport	0.55.843		13
14	78	(New Zealand) Earl Bamber	Team Meritus	0.55.968		14
15	28	(New Zealand) Nelson Hartley	Victory Motor Racing	0.56.004		15
16	87	(New Zealand) Ben Crighton	Ben Crighton Racing	0.56.035		16
17	98	(New Zealand) Mark Russ	Victory Motor Racing	0.56.280		17

=== Grand Prix ===
Pos	No.	Driver	Team	Laps	Time	Grid
1	1	(New Zealand) Daniel Gaunt	International Motorsport	40	37min 14.551sec	1
2	45	(New Zealand) Matthew Hamilton	ESWA Racing	40	+ 4.873 s	3
3	20	(New Zealand) Daynom Templeman	Zenith Racing	40	+ 28.916 s	6
4	5	(New Zealand) Dominic Storey	Auto Motion	40	+ 33.929 s	8
5	9	(New Zealand) Nic Jordan	Auto Motion	40	+ 34.129 s	9
6	55	(New Zealand) Christina Orr	Mark Petch Motorsport	40	+ 34.638 s	13
7	40	(New Zealand) Mark Munro	Auto Motion	40	+ 35.186 s	10
8	28	(New Zealand) Nelson Hartley	Victory Motor Racing	40	+ 36.105 s	15
9	98	(New Zealand) Mark Russ	Victory Motor Racing	40	+ 41.039 s	17
10	42	(Australia) Leanne Tander	European Technique	40	+ 42.433 s	12
11	87	(New Zealand) Ben Crighton	Ben Crighton Racing	39	+ 1 lap	16
12	97	(New Zealand) Shane van Gisbergen	International Motorsport	39	+ 1 lap	5
13	3	(New Zealand) Andy Knight	Knight Motorsport	39	+ 1 lap	4
14	7	(New Zealand) Ben Harford	Auto Motion	37	+ 3 laps	2
15	72	(Australia) David Besnard		32	+ 8 laps	7
Ret	11	(New Zealand) Ken Smith	Ken Smith Motorsport	13	Retired	11
Ret	78	(New Zealand) Earl Bamber	Team Meritus	0	Retired	14

Preceded by 2006 New Zealand Grand Prix	New Zealand Grand Prix; 2007	Succeeded by 2008 New Zealand Grand Prix
