= 2005 New Zealand Grand Prix =

- 50th New Zealand Grand Prix

Race details
- Date: 16 January 2005
- Official name: L New Zealand Grand Prix
- Location: Teretonga Park, Feilding, New Zealand
- Course: Permanent racing facility
- Course length: 2.57 km (1.59 miles)
- Distance: 35 laps, 102.8 km (63.6 miles)
- Weather: Fine

Pole position
- Driver: (New Zealand) Jason Liefting
- Time: 1:02.799

Fastest lap
- Driver: (New Zealand) Andy Knight
- Time: 1:02.391 on lap 31

Podium
- First: (New Zealand) Simon Gamble
- Second: (New Zealand) Jason Liefting
- Third: (New Zealand) Hamish Cross

The 2005 New Zealand Grand Prix was an open wheel racing car race held at Teretonga Park, near Invercargill on 16 January 2005.

It was the fiftieth New Zealand Grand Prix and was open to Formula Ford cars.

== Classification ==
=== Qualifying ===
Pos	No.	Driver	Car	Quali 1	Top 10	Grid
1	7	(New Zealand) Jason Liefting		1:02.386	1:02.799	1
2	97	(New Zealand) Andy Knight		1:02.186	1:02.914	2
3	26	(Australia) Shannon O'Brien	Van Diemen RF03	1:02.448	1:02.959	3
4	55	(New Zealand) Christina Orr		1:02.613	1:03.172	4
5	9	(New Zealand) Marc Doran		1:02.652	1:03.249	5
6	56	(New Zealand) Phil Hellebrekers		1:03.272	1:03.299	6
7	10	(New Zealand) Simon Gamble	Spectrum 010 Ford	1:03.044	1:03.614	7
8	66	(New Zealand) Hamish Cross		1:02.772	1:03.959	8
9	88	(New Zealand) Mathew Radisich		1:03.201	1:04.055	9
10	45	(New Zealand) Keeley Pudney		1:02.772	1:04.265	10
11	80	(New Zealand) Le Roy Stevenson		1:03.137		11
12	13	(New Zealand) Daniel Jilesen		1:03.205		12
13	12	(New Zealand) Russell Hartley		1:03.298		13
14	40	(New Zealand) Jayant Singh		1:03.363		14
15	11	(New Zealand) Taryn Kugener		1:03.437		15
16	41	(United States) Slade Miller		1:03.449		16
17	15	(New Zealand) Hugh Gardiner		1:03.695		17
18	36	(New Zealand) Kurt Peterson		1:03.749		18
19	31	(New Zealand) Nick Buxeda		1:04.121		19
20	32	(New Zealand) Gary Lovie		1:04.198		20
21	22	(New Zealand) Robert Toshach		1:04.432		21
22	47	(New Zealand) David Higgins		1:04.567		22
23	35	(New Zealand) James Mitchell		1:04.875		23
24	20	(New Zealand) Royce Bayer		1:04.907		24
25	44	(New Zealand) Noel Atley		1:05.329		25
26	17	(New Zealand) Gordon McIntyre		1:05.606		26
27	70	(New Zealand) David Arrowsmith		1:05.863		27
28	77	(New Zealand) Steve Edwards		1:06.237		28
29	37	(New Zealand) Stephen Heffeman		1:06.425		29
30	18	(New Zealand) Ian Bisman		1:06.450		30
31	27	(New Zealand) Wayne Colville		1:06.629		31
32	76	(New Zealand) Munro Tall		1:06.870		32
33	71	(New Zealand) Robin Judkins		1:11.656		33

=== Race ===
Pos	No.	Driver	Car	Laps	Time	Grid
1	10	(New Zealand) Simon Gamble	Spectrum 010 Ford	40	1hr 02min 00.083sec	7
2	66	(New Zealand) Hamish Cross		40	+ 0.443 s	8
3	45	(New Zealand) Keeley Pudney		40	+ 1.113 s	10
4	88	(New Zealand) Mathew Radisich		40	+ 10.962 s	9
5	80	(New Zealand) Le Roy Stevenson		40	+ 11.012 s	11
6	55	(New Zealand) Christina Orr		40	+ 11.403 s	4
7	13	(New Zealand) Daniel Jilesen		40	+ 11.464 s	12
8	9	(New Zealand) Marc Doran		40	+ 18.531 s	5
9	15	(New Zealand) Hugh Gardiner		40	+ 19.876 s	17
10	31	(New Zealand) Nick Buxeda		40	+ 29.366 s	19
11	11	(New Zealand) Taryn Kugener		40	+ 34.668 s	15
12	22	(New Zealand) Robert Toshach		40	+ 43.916 s	21
13	22	(New Zealand) Gary Lovie		40	+ 50.537 s	20
14	70	(New Zealand) David Arrowsmith		40	+ 1:05.552 s	27
15	97	(New Zealand) Andy Knight		39	+ 1 lap	2
16	17	(New Zealand) Gordon McIntyre		39	+ 1 lap	26
17	26	(Australia) Shannon O'Brien	Van Diemen RF03	39	+ 1 lap	3
18	18	(New Zealand) Ian Bisman		39	+ 1 lap	30
19	37	(New Zealand) Stephen Heffernan		39	+ 1 lap	29
20	76	(New Zealand) Munro Tall		38	+ 2 laps	32
21	71	(New Zealand) Robin Judkins		38	+ 2 laps	33
DSQ	7	(New Zealand) Jason Liefting		40	Disqualified	1
Ret	35	(New Zealand) James Mitchell		24	Retired	23
Ret	41	(United States) Slade Miller		22	Retired	16
Ret	20	(New Zealand) Royce Bayer		21	Retired	24
Ret	56	(New Zealand) Phil Hellebrekers		13	Retired	6
Ret	36	(New Zealand) Kurt Peterson		12	Retired	18
Ret	44	(New Zealand) Noel Atley		10	Retired	25
Ret	77	(New Zealand) Steve Edwards		9	Retired	28
Ret	47	(New Zealand) David Higgins		8	Retired	22
Ret	40	(New Zealand) Jayant Singh		3	Retired	14
DNS	27	(New Zealand) Wayne Colville			Did Not Start	

Preceded by 2004 New Zealand Grand Prix	New Zealand Grand Prix; 2005	Succeeded by 2006 New Zealand Grand Prix
