= New Zealand Grand Prix =

Annual motor racing event in New Zealand

- Highlands Motorsport Park (2024–present)
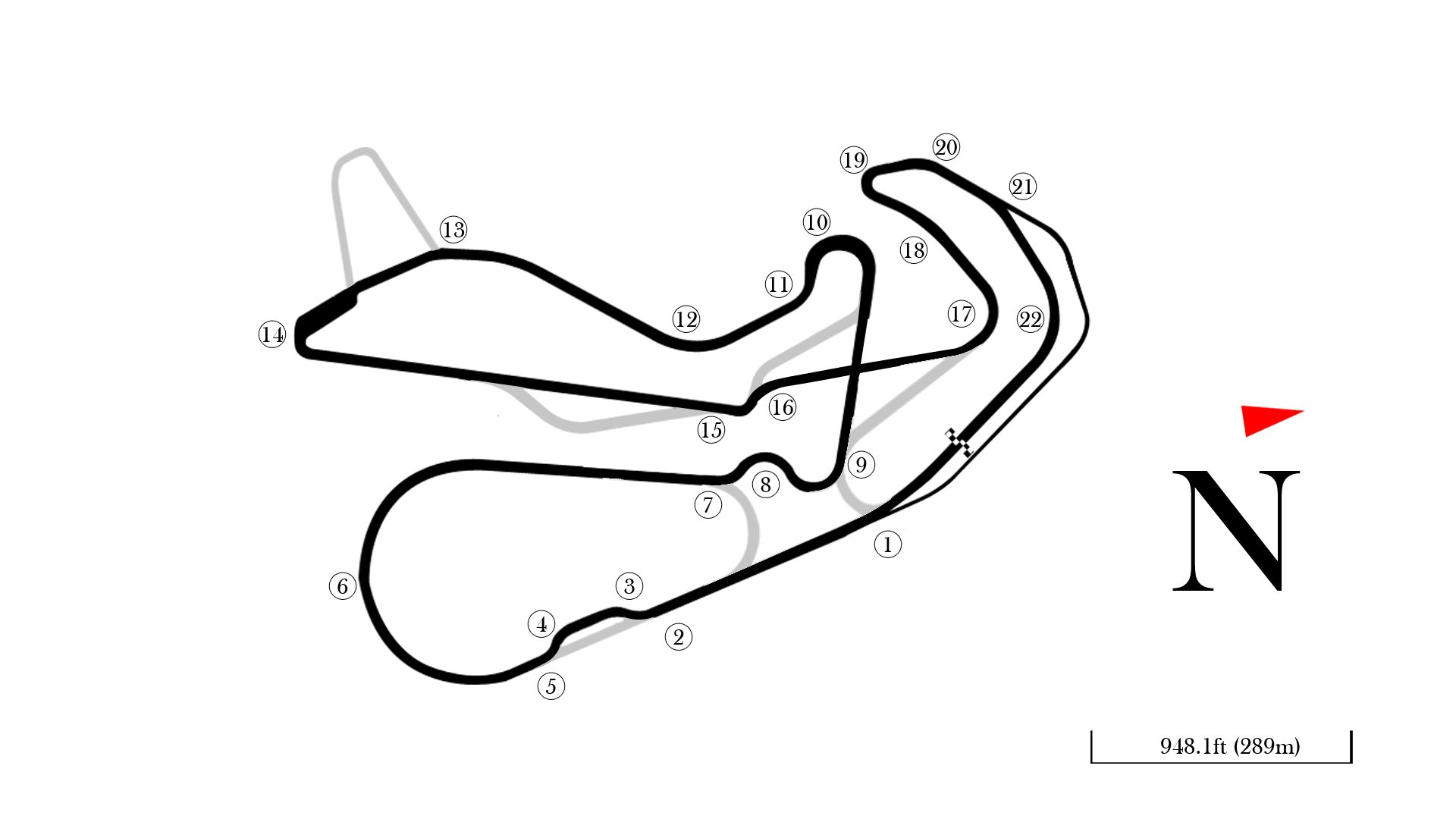

Race information
- Number of times held: 70
- First held: 1950
- Most wins (drivers): (United Kingdom) Stirling Moss (3) (Australia) Jack Brabham (3) (New Zealand) Craig Baird (3) (New Zealand) Ken Smith (3) (New Zealand) Nick Cassidy (3)
- Most wins (constructors): (Italy) Tatuus (20)
- Circuit length: 4.100 km (2.548 miles)
- Race length: 114.8 km (71.3 miles)
- Laps: 27

Last race (2026)

Pole position
- (Japan) Jin Nakamura; Hitech TGR; 1:28.339

Podium
- 1. (New Zealand) Zack Scoular; mtec Motorsport; 2. (Japan) Jin Nakamura; Hitech TGR; 3. (Japan) Kanato Le; Hitech TGR

Fastest lap
- (New Zealand) Zack Scoular; mtec Motorsport; 1:29.104

The New Zealand Grand Prix, sometimes known as the New Zealand International Grand Prix, is an annual motor racing event held in New Zealand. First held in 1950, it is best known for hosting rounds of the Tasman Series in the 1960s and 1970s. It is currently run as the signature race of the Formula Regional Oceania Championship.

It is one of only two current national Grand Prix events that are not part of the Formula One World Championship, the other being the Macau Grand Prix.

== History ==
The race was once an important race on the international calendar, most notably when it was a part of the Tasman Series. In this era, several contemporary Formula One drivers would compete in the race, often with great success. Six Formula One World Drivers' Champions have won the New Zealand Grand Prix, including three-time champions Sir Jack Brabham and Sir Jackie Stewart. In the years following the demise of the Tasman Series, Formula One drivers did not regularly compete in extra-curricular races, and as such the New Zealand Grand Prix lost many of its big-name entrants. It was run for smaller local or continental formulae in the 1990s and 2000s such as Formula Holden.

From 2006 to 2020, the race was run as part of the Toyota Racing Series, which has gained international prominence due to the championship being held over the Northern Hemisphere winter. This has resulted in many international drivers, particularly young developmental drivers, joining the championship in their traditional off-season, thus restoring a level of prestige to the event. It is seen as a stepping stone to larger open-wheeler classes, such as Formula 3, and beyond, and drivers such as Daniil Kvyat, Alex Lynn, Lance Stroll and Lando Norris have competed in the race and then gone on to compete as race or test drivers in Formula One. From 2023, it will be part of the Formula Regional Oceania Championship.

In its history, the race has been held in eight different locations across New Zealand. Pukekohe Park Raceway in Pukekohe has been the most common venue, with the race being held there 29 times. The Circuit Chris Amon, formerly Manfeild Autocourse, in Feilding hosted the event between 2008 and 2020. Hampton Downs Motorsport Park, which had campaigned to host the event for several years, became the new host of the event in 2021. Due to travel restrictions caused by the COVID-19 pandemic, the 2021 event was only contested by New Zealand drivers, with Supercars Championship regulars Shane van Gisbergen and Andre Heimgartner joining the field alongside past winners Greg Murphy and Ken Smith, who contested his 50th New Zealand Grand Prix. Van Gisbergen won the event, despite starting from pitlane due to a pre-race issue.

== Winners ==
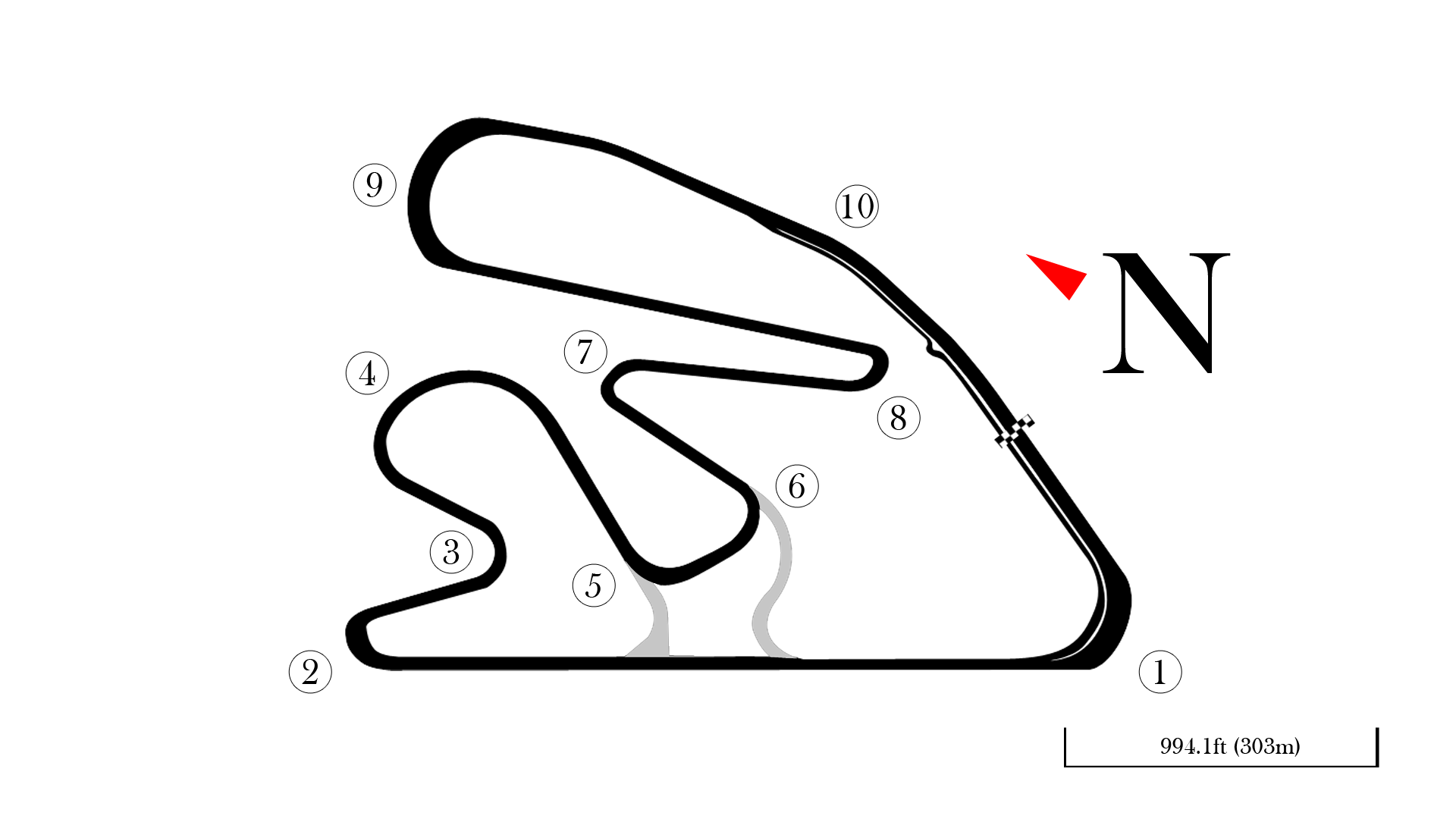
Hampton Downs, used in 2021 and 2023

Teretonga Park, used in 2002–2007

Ruapuna Park, used in 1998–1999

Manfeild, used 1992–1995, 2008–2020

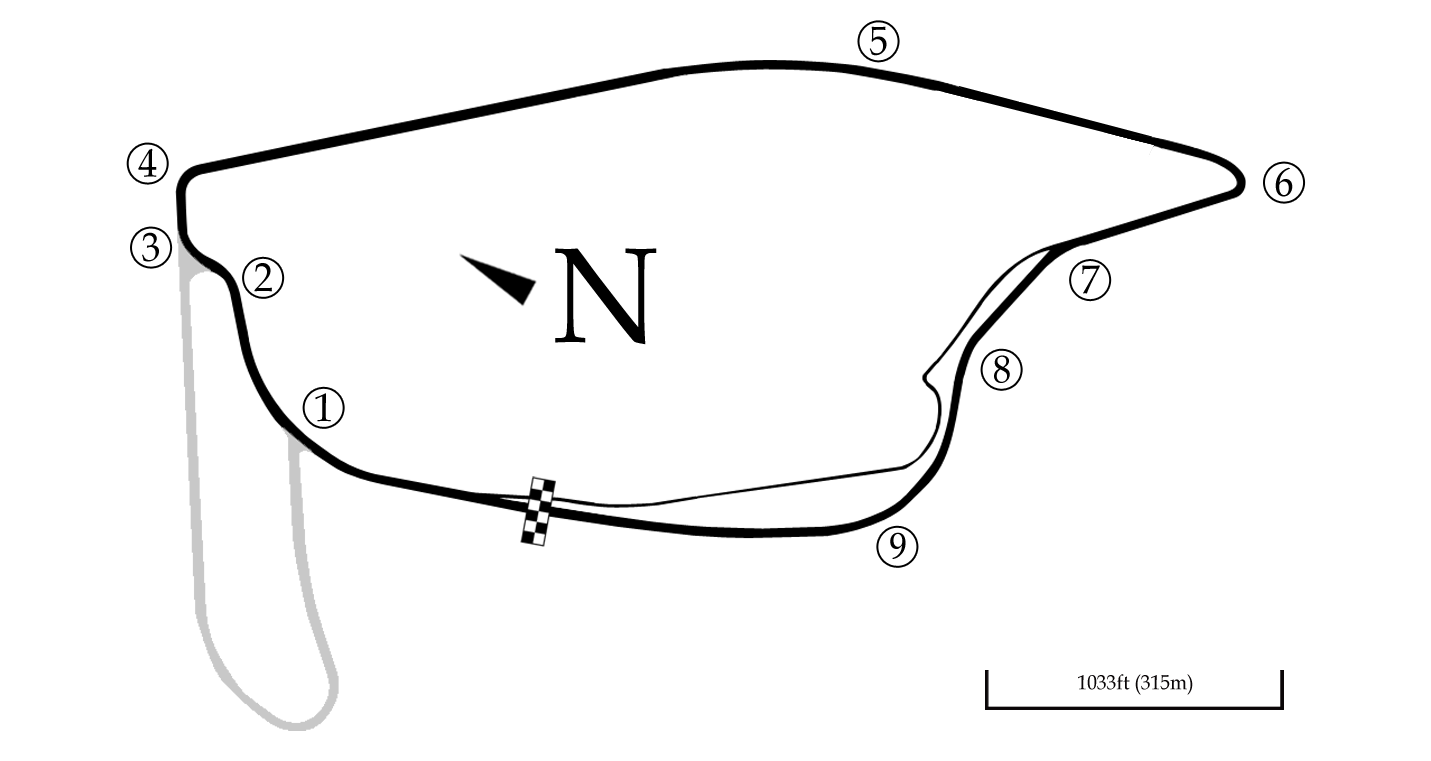
Pukekohe Park (1990–2012), used in 1990–1991 and 2000

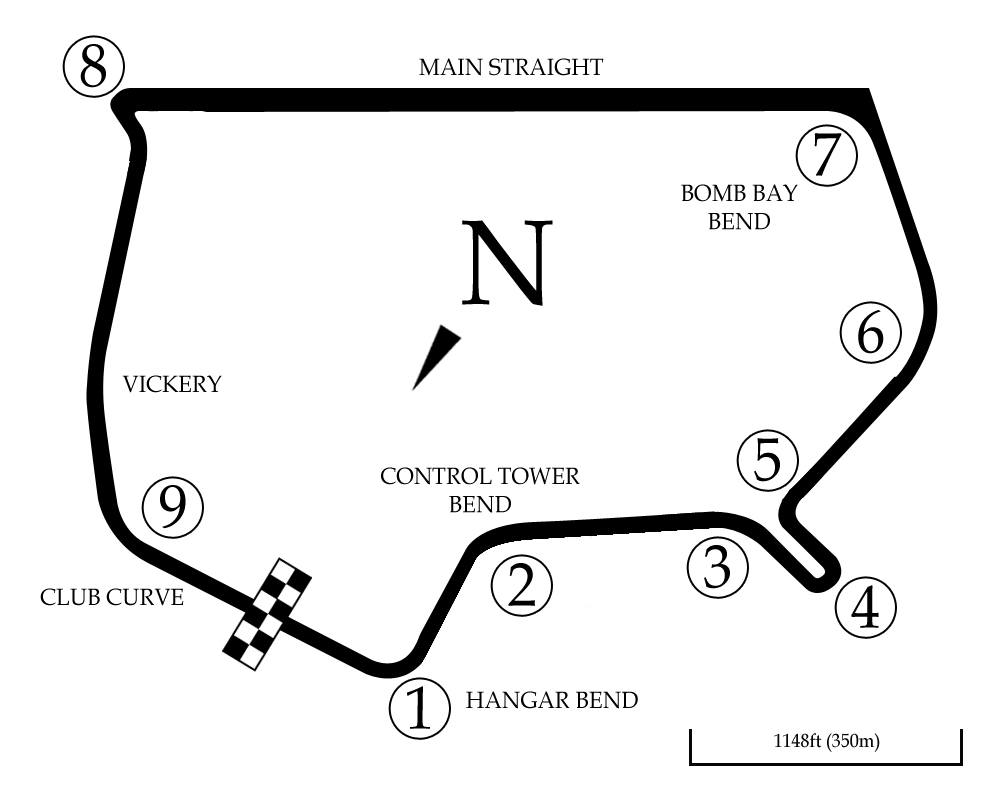
Wigram Airfield Circuit, used in 1974

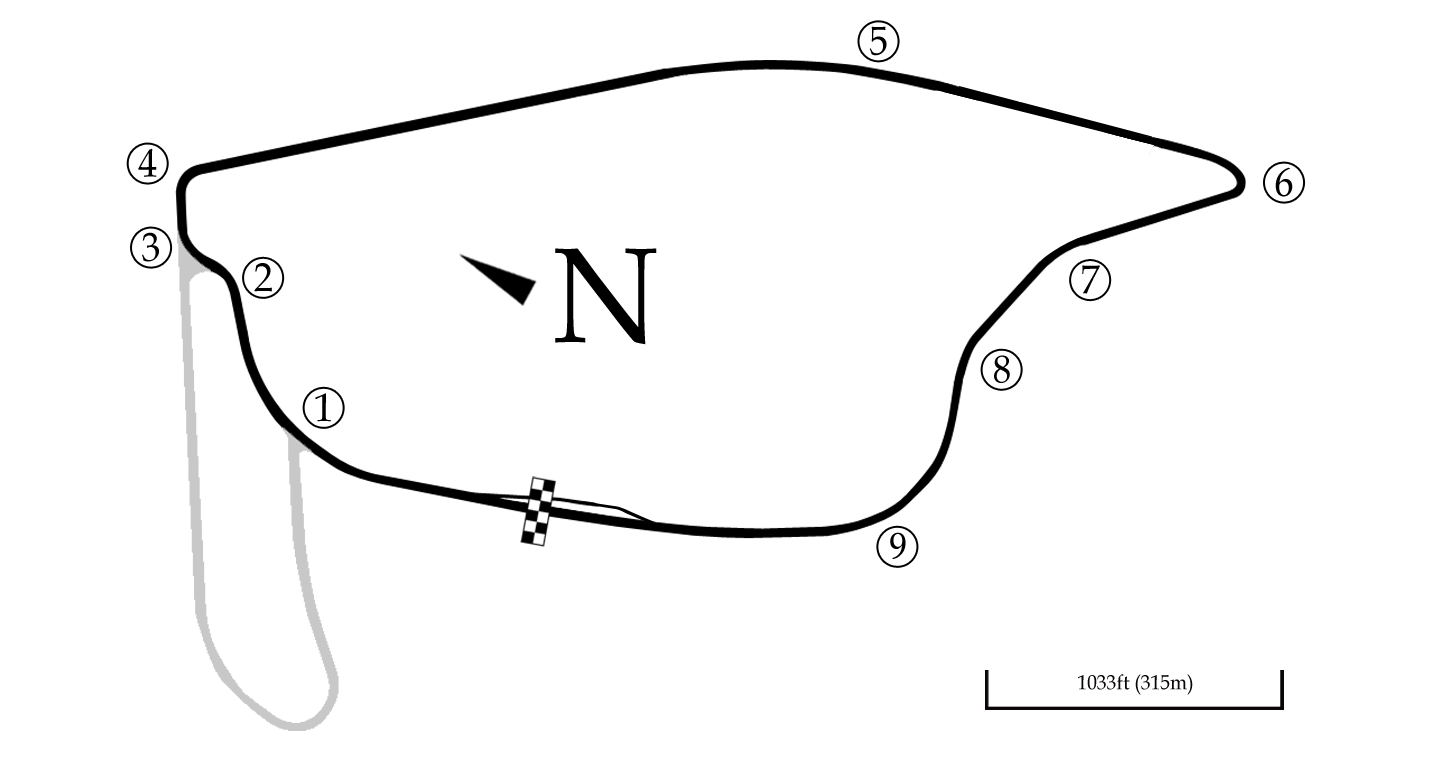
Pukekohe Park (1967–1989), used 1967–1973, 1975–1989

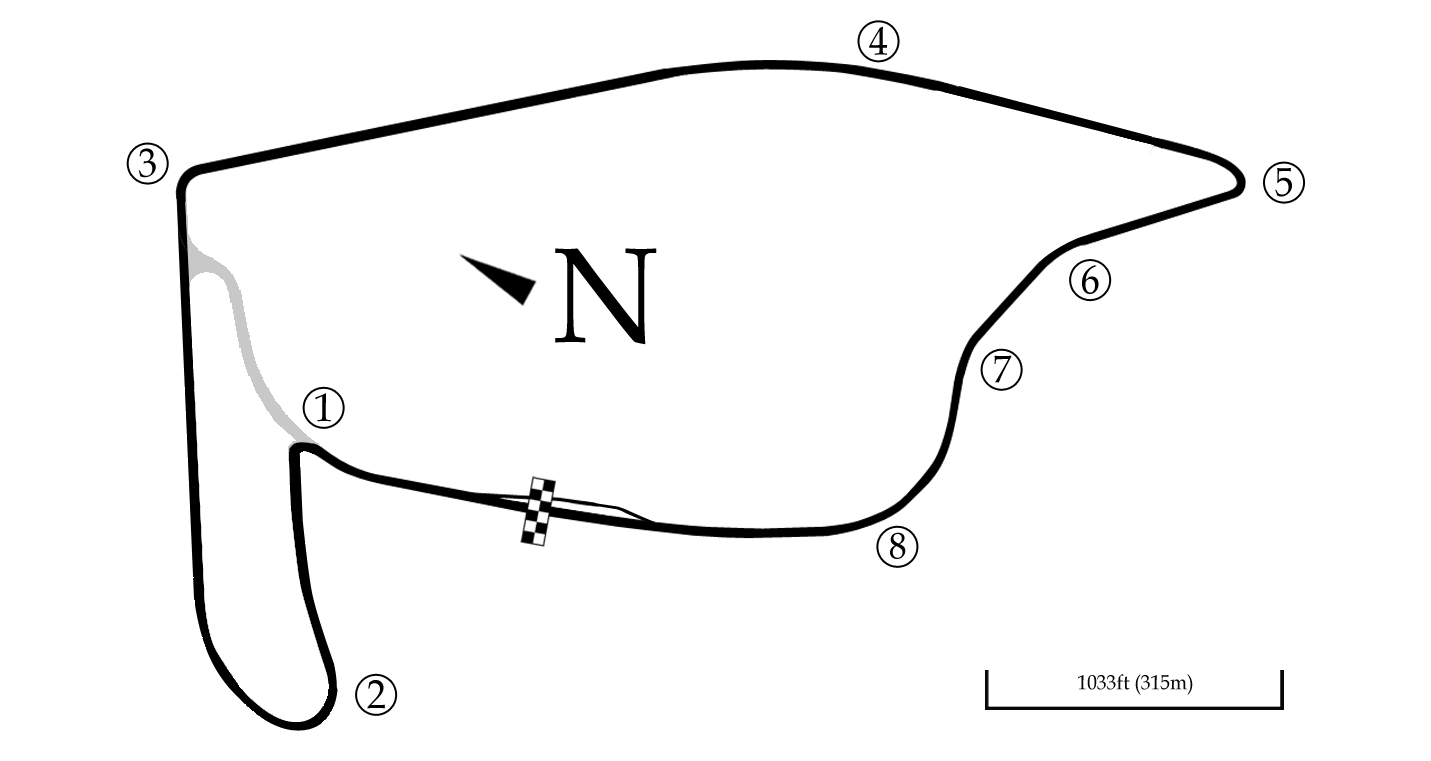
Pukekohe Park (1963–1966), used in 1963–1966

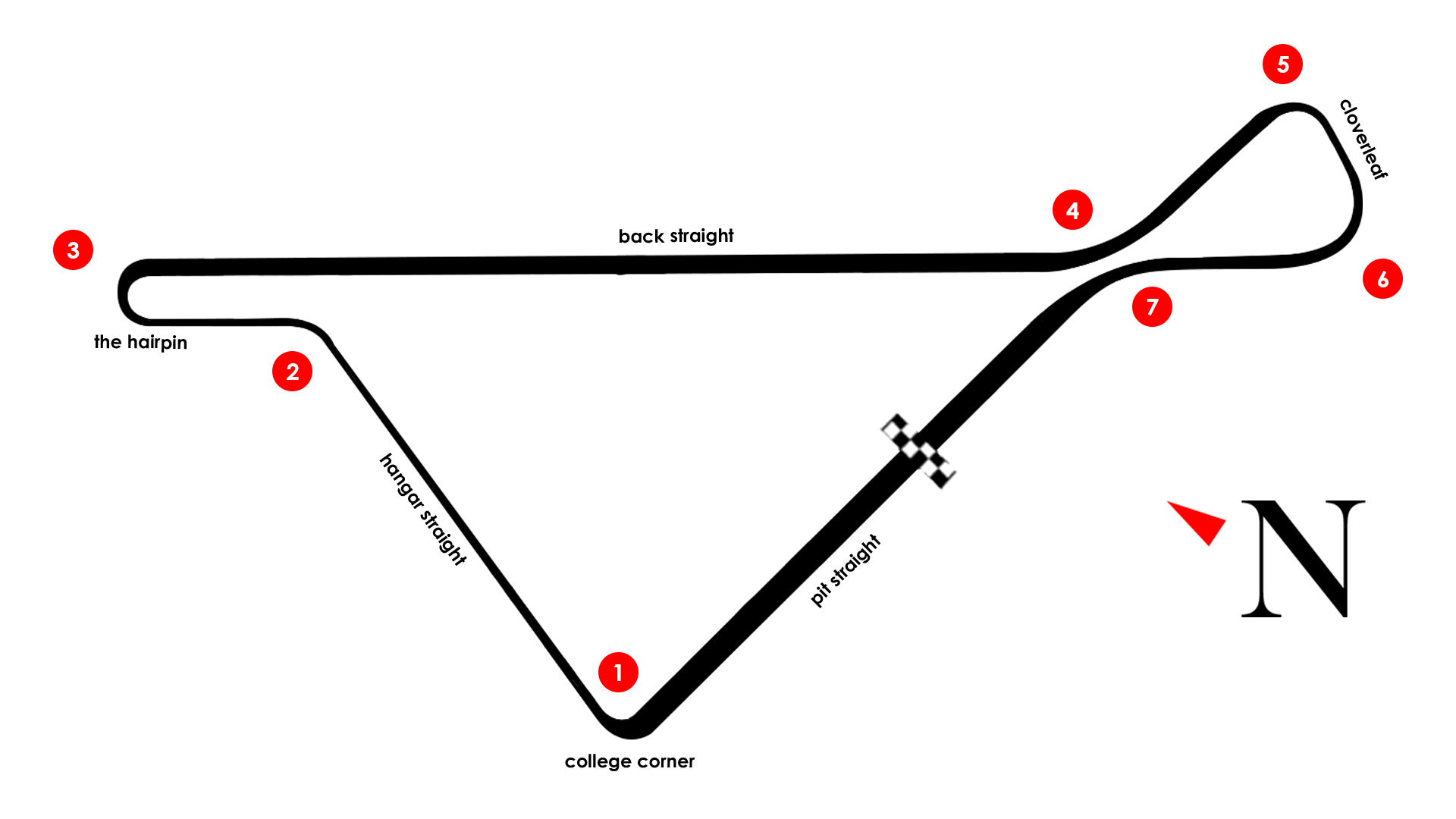
Ardmore Circuit, used in 1954–1962

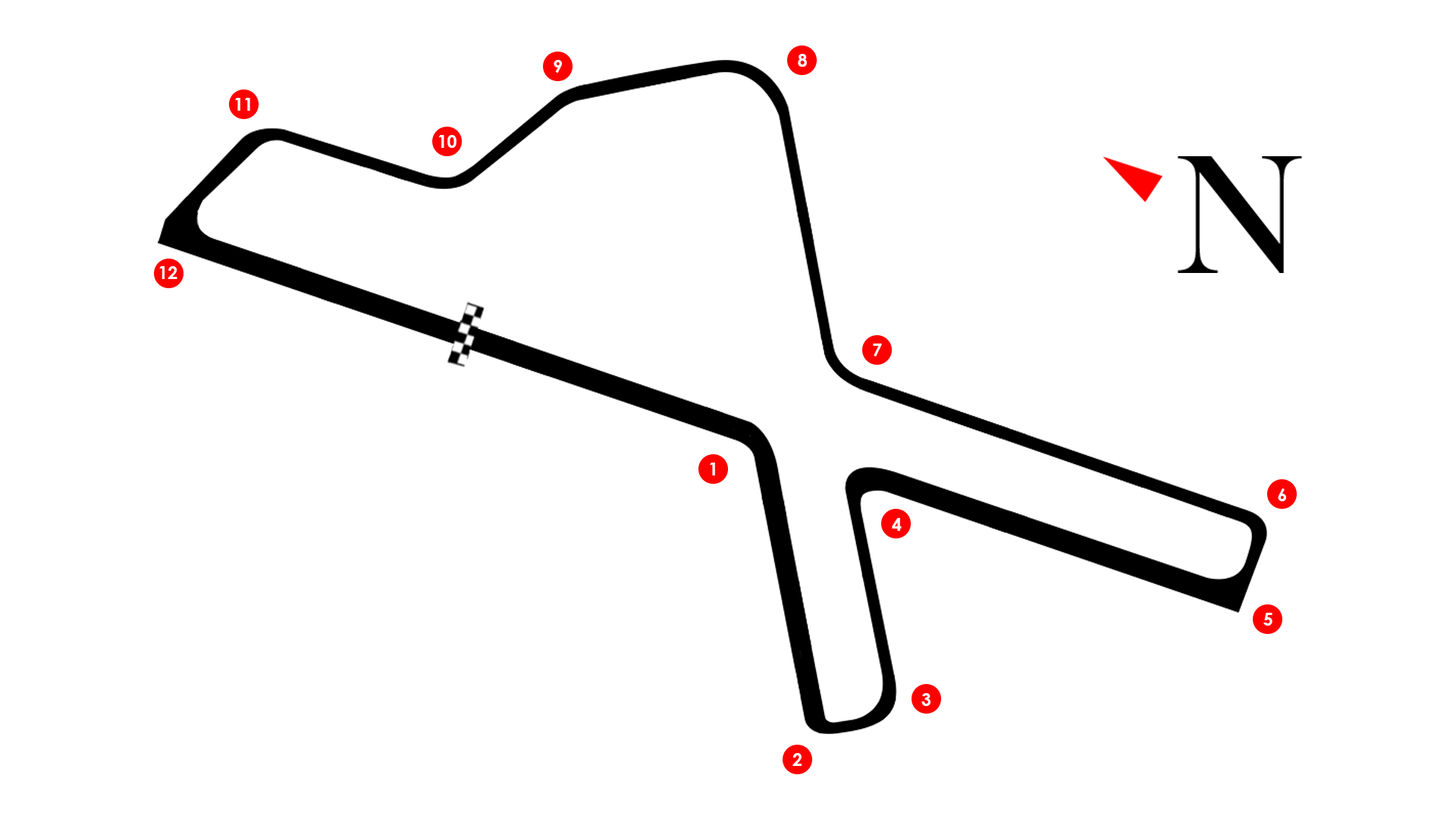
Ohakea, used in 1950

| Year | Winner | Car | Class | Circuit | Report |
|---|---|---|---|---|---|
| 1950 | (New Zealand) John McMillan | Jackson Special Ford | Formula Libre | Ohakea Circuit | Report |
| 1951 – 1953 | Not held | | | | |
| 1954 | (Australia) Stan Jones | Maybach Special | Formula Libre | Ardmore Circuit | Report |
| 1955 | (Thailand) Prince B. Bira | Maserati 250F | Formula Libre | Ardmore Circuit | Report |
| 1956 | (United Kingdom) Stirling Moss | Maserati 250F | Formula Libre | Ardmore Circuit | Report |
| 1957 | (United Kingdom) Reg Parnell | Ferrari 555/860 | Formula Libre | Ardmore Circuit | Report |
| 1958 | (Australia) Jack Brabham | Cooper T43 Climax | Formula Libre | Ardmore Circuit | Report |
| 1959 | (United Kingdom) Stirling Moss | Cooper T45 Climax | Formula Libre | Ardmore Circuit | Report |
| 1960 | (Australia) Jack Brabham | Cooper T51 Climax | Formula Libre | Ardmore Circuit | Report |
| 1961 | (Australia) Jack Brabham | Cooper T53 Climax | Formula Libre | Ardmore Circuit | Report |
| 1962 | (United Kingdom) Stirling Moss | Lotus 21 Climax | Formula Libre | Ardmore Circuit | Report |
| 1963 | (United Kingdom) John Surtees | Lola Mk4 Climax | Formula Libre | Pukekohe Park Raceway | Report |
| 1964 | (New Zealand) Bruce McLaren | Cooper T70 Climax | Tasman Series (Tasman Formula) | Pukekohe Park Raceway | Report |
| 1965 | (United Kingdom) Graham Hill | Brabham BT11A Climax | Tasman Series (Tasman Formula) | Pukekohe Park Raceway | Report |
| 1966 | (United Kingdom) Graham Hill | BRM P261 | Tasman Series (Tasman Formula) | Pukekohe Park Raceway | Report |
| 1967 | (United Kingdom) Jackie Stewart | BRM P261 | Tasman Series (Tasman Formula) | Pukekohe Park Raceway | Report |
| 1968 | (New Zealand) Chris Amon | Ferrari 246T Ferrari V6 | Tasman Series (Tasman Formula) | Pukekohe Park Raceway | Report |
| 1969 | (New Zealand) Chris Amon | Ferrari 246T Ferrari V6 | Tasman Series (Tasman Formula) | Pukekohe Park Raceway | Report |
| 1970 | (Australia) Frank Matich | McLaren M10A Chevrolet | Tasman Series (Formula 5000) | Pukekohe Park Raceway | Report |
| 1971 | (Australia) Niel Allen | McLaren M10B Chevrolet | Tasman Series (Formula 5000) | Pukekohe Park Raceway | Report |
| 1972 | (Australia) Frank Gardner | Lola T300 Chevrolet | Tasman Series (Formula 5000) | Pukekohe Park Raceway | Report |
| 1973 | (Australia) John McCormack | Elfin MR5 Repco-Holden | Tasman Series (Formula 5000) | Pukekohe Park Raceway | Report |
| 1974 | (Australia) John McCormack | Elfin MR5 Repco-Holden | Tasman Series (Formula 5000) | Wigram Airfield Circuit | Report |
| 1975 | (Australia) Warwick Brown | Lola T332 Chevrolet | Tasman Series (Formula 5000) | Pukekohe Park Raceway | Report |
| 1976 | (New Zealand) Ken Smith | Lola T332 Chevrolet | Formula 5000 | Pukekohe Park Raceway | Report |
| 1977 | (Finland) Keke Rosberg | Chevron B34 | Formula Pacific | Pukekohe Park Raceway | Report |
| 1978 | (Finland) Keke Rosberg | Chevron B34 | Formula Pacific | Pukekohe Park Raceway | Report |
| 1979 | (Italy) Teo Fabi | March 79B | Formula Pacific | Pukekohe Park Raceway | Report |
| 1980 | (New Zealand) Steve Millen | Ralt RT1 | Formula Pacific | Pukekohe Park Raceway | Report |
| 1981 | (New Zealand) David McMillan | Ralt RT1 | Formula Pacific | Pukekohe Park Raceway | Report |
| 1982 | (Brazil) Roberto Moreno | Ralt RT4 Ford | Formula Pacific | Pukekohe Park Raceway | Report |
| 1983 | (New Zealand) David Oxton | Ralt RT4 Ford | Formula Mondial | Pukekohe Park Raceway | Report |
| 1984 | (United States) Davy Jones | Ralt RT4 Ford | Formula Pacific | Pukekohe Park Raceway | Report |
| 1985 | (United States) Ross Cheever | Ralt RT4 Ford | Formula Pacific | Pukekohe Park Raceway | Report |
| 1986 | (United States) Ross Cheever | Ralt RT4 Ford | Formula Pacific | Pukekohe Park Raceway | Report |
| 1987 | (United States) Davy Jones | Ralt RT4 Ford | Formula Pacific | Pukekohe Park Raceway | Report |
| 1988 | (New Zealand) Paul Radisich | Ralt RT4 Ford | Formula Pacific | Pukekohe Park Raceway | Report |
| 1989 | (United States) Dean Hall | Swift Cosworth | Formula Pacific | Pukekohe Park Raceway | Report |
| 1990 | (New Zealand) Ken Smith | Swift Cosworth | Formula Pacific | Pukekohe Park Raceway | |
| 1991 | (New Zealand) Craig Baird | Swift Toyota | Formula Pacific | Pukekohe Park Raceway | Report |
| 1992 | (New Zealand) Craig Baird | Reynard 92H | Formula Atlantic | Manfeild Autocourse | |
| 1993 | (New Zealand) Craig Baird | Reynard 92H | Formula Atlantic | Manfeild Autocourse | |
| 1994 | (New Zealand) Greg Murphy | Reynard 90D Holden | Formula Brabham | Manfeild Autocourse | |
| 1995 | (New Zealand) Brady Kennett | Reynard 91D Holden | Formula Brabham | Manfeild Autocourse | Report |
| 1996 – 1997 | Not held | | | | |
| 1998 | (New Zealand) Simon Wills | Reynard 94D Holden | Formula Holden | Ruapuna Park | Report |
| 1999 | (New Zealand) Simon Wills | Reynard 94D Holden | Formula Holden | Ruapuna Park | Report |
| 2000 | (New Zealand) Andy Booth | Reynard 94D Holden | Formula Holden | Pukekohe Park Raceway | Report |
| 2001 | Not held | | | | |
| 2002 | (New Zealand) Fabian Coulthard | Van Diemen Stealth RF94 Ford | Formula Ford | Teretonga Park | Report |
| 2003 | (New Zealand) Jonny Reid | Van Diemen Stealth RF94 Ford | Formula Ford | Teretonga Park | Report |
| 2004 | (New Zealand) Ken Smith | Van Diemen Stealth Evo2 Ford | Formula Ford | Teretonga Park | Report |
| 2005 | (New Zealand) Simon Gamble | Spectrum 010 Ford | Formula Ford | Teretonga Park | Report |
| 2006 | (Bahrain) Hamad Al Fardan | Tatuus FT-40 Toyota | Toyota Racing Series | Teretonga Park | Report |
| 2007 | (New Zealand) Daniel Gaunt | Tatuus FT-40 Toyota | Toyota Racing Series | Teretonga Park | Report |
| 2008 | (New Zealand) Andy Knight | Tatuus FT-40 Toyota | Toyota Racing Series | Manfeild Autocourse (Circuit Chris Amon)^{1} | Report |
| 2009 | (New Zealand) Daniel Gaunt | Tatuus FT-40 Toyota | Toyota Racing Series | Manfeild Autocourse (Circuit Chris Amon)^{1} | Report |
| 2010 | (New Zealand) Earl Bamber | Tatuus FT-40 Toyota | Toyota Racing Series | Manfeild Autocourse (Circuit Chris Amon)^{1} | Report |
| 2011 | (New Zealand) Mitch Evans | Tatuus FT-40 Toyota | Toyota Racing Series | Manfeild Autocourse (Circuit Chris Amon)^{1} | Report |
| 2012 | (New Zealand) Nick Cassidy | Tatuus FT-40 Toyota | Toyota Racing Series | Manfeild Autocourse (Circuit Chris Amon)^{1} | Report |
| 2013 | (New Zealand) Nick Cassidy | Tatuus FT-40 Toyota | Toyota Racing Series | Manfeild Autocourse (Circuit Chris Amon)^{1} | Report |
| 2014 | (New Zealand) Nick Cassidy | Tatuus FT-40 Toyota | Toyota Racing Series | Manfeild Autocourse (Circuit Chris Amon)^{1} | Report |
| 2015 | (Canada) Lance Stroll | Tatuus FT-50 Toyota | Toyota Racing Series | Manfeild Autocourse (Circuit Chris Amon)^{1} | Report |
| 2016 | (United Kingdom) Lando Norris | Tatuus FT-50 Toyota | Toyota Racing Series | Manfeild Autocourse (Circuit Chris Amon)^{1} | Report |
| 2017 | (India) Jehan Daruvala | Tatuus FT-50 Toyota | Toyota Racing Series | Manfeild Autocourse (Circuit Chris Amon)^{1} | Report |
| 2018 | (Netherlands) Richard Verschoor | Tatuus FT-50 Toyota | Toyota Racing Series | Manfeild Autocourse (Circuit Chris Amon)^{1} | Report |
| 2019 | (New Zealand) Liam Lawson | Tatuus FT-50 Toyota | Toyota Racing Series | Manfeild Autocourse (Circuit Chris Amon)^{1} | Report |
| 2020 | (Brazil) Igor Fraga | Tatuus F.3 T-318 "FT-60" Toyota | Toyota Racing Series | Manfeild Autocourse (Circuit Chris Amon)^{1} | Report |
| 2021 | (New Zealand) Shane van Gisbergen | Tatuus F.3 T-318 "FT-60" Toyota | Toyota Racing Series | Hampton Downs Motorsport Park | Report |
| 2022 | Cancelled due to the COVID-19 border restrictions | | | | |
| 2023 | (Netherlands) Laurens van Hoepen | Tatuus F.3 T-318 "FT-60" Toyota | Formula Regional Oceania Championship | Hampton Downs Motorsport Park | Report |
| 2024 | (New Zealand) Liam Sceats | Tatuus F.3 T-318 "FT-60" Toyota | Formula Regional Oceania Championship | Highlands Motorsport Park | Report |
| 2025 | (Australia) Will Brown | Tatuus F.3 T-318 "FT-60" Toyota | Formula Regional Oceania Championship | Highlands Motorsport Park | Report |
| 2026 | (New Zealand) Zack Scoular | Tatuus F.3 T-318 "FT-60" Toyota | Formula Regional Oceania Trophy | Highlands Motorsport Park | Report |

Notes

- ^1 – The Manfeild Autocourse was renamed the Circuit Chris Amon in late 2016.

== Multiple winners ==
=== By driver ===
| Wins | Driver | Years |
|---|---|---|
| 3 | (Australia) Jack Brabham | 1958, 1960, 1961 |
| 3 | (United Kingdom) Stirling Moss | 1956, 1959, 1962 |
| 3 | (New Zealand) Craig Baird | 1991, 1992, 1993 |
| 3 | (New Zealand) Ken Smith | 1976, 1990, 2004 |
| 3 | (New Zealand) Nick Cassidy | 2012, 2013, 2014 |
| 2 | (United Kingdom) Graham Hill | 1965, 1966 |
| 2 | (New Zealand) Chris Amon | 1968, 1969 |
| 2 | (Australia) John McCormack | 1973, 1974 |
| 2 | (Finland) Keke Rosberg | 1977, 1978 |
| 2 | (United States) Ross Cheever | 1985, 1986 |
| 2 | (United States) Davy Jones | 1984, 1987 |
| 2 | (New Zealand) Simon Wills | 1998, 1999 |
| 2 | (New Zealand) Daniel Gaunt | 2007, 2009 |

=== By constructor ===
| Wins | Constructor |
|---|---|
| 20 | (Italy) Tatuus |
| 9 | (Australia) Ralt |
| 7 | (United Kingdom) Reynard |
| 5 | (United Kingdom) Cooper |
| 4 | (United Kingdom) Lola |
| 3 | (Italy) Ferrari |
| 3 | (United States) Swift |
| 3 | (United Kingdom) Van Diemen |
| 2 | (Italy) Maserati |
| 2 | (United Kingdom) BRM |
| 2 | (United Kingdom) McLaren |
| 2 | (Australia) Elfin |
| 2 | (United Kingdom) Chevron |

=== By country ===
| Wins | Country | Years |
|---|---|---|
| 33 | New Zealand | 1950, 1964, 1968, 1969, 1976, 1980, 1981, 1983, 1990, 1991, 1992, 1993, 1994, 1995, 1998, 1999, 2000, 2002, 2003, 2004, 2005, 2007, 2008, 2009, 2010, 2011, 2012, 2013, 2014, 2019, 2021, 2024, 2026 |
| 11 | Australia | 1954, 1958, 1960, 1961, 1970, 1971, 1972, 1973, 1974, 1975, 2025 |
| 9 | United Kingdom | 1956, 1957, 1959, 1962, 1963, 1965, 1966, 1967, 2016 |
| 5 | United States | 1984, 1985, 1986, 1987, 1989 |
| 2 | Finland | 1977, 1978 |
| 2 | Brazil | 1982, 2020 |
| 2 | Netherlands | 2018, 2023 |
