= 2000 New Zealand Grand Prix =

- Race 4 of the 2000 Tasman Cup
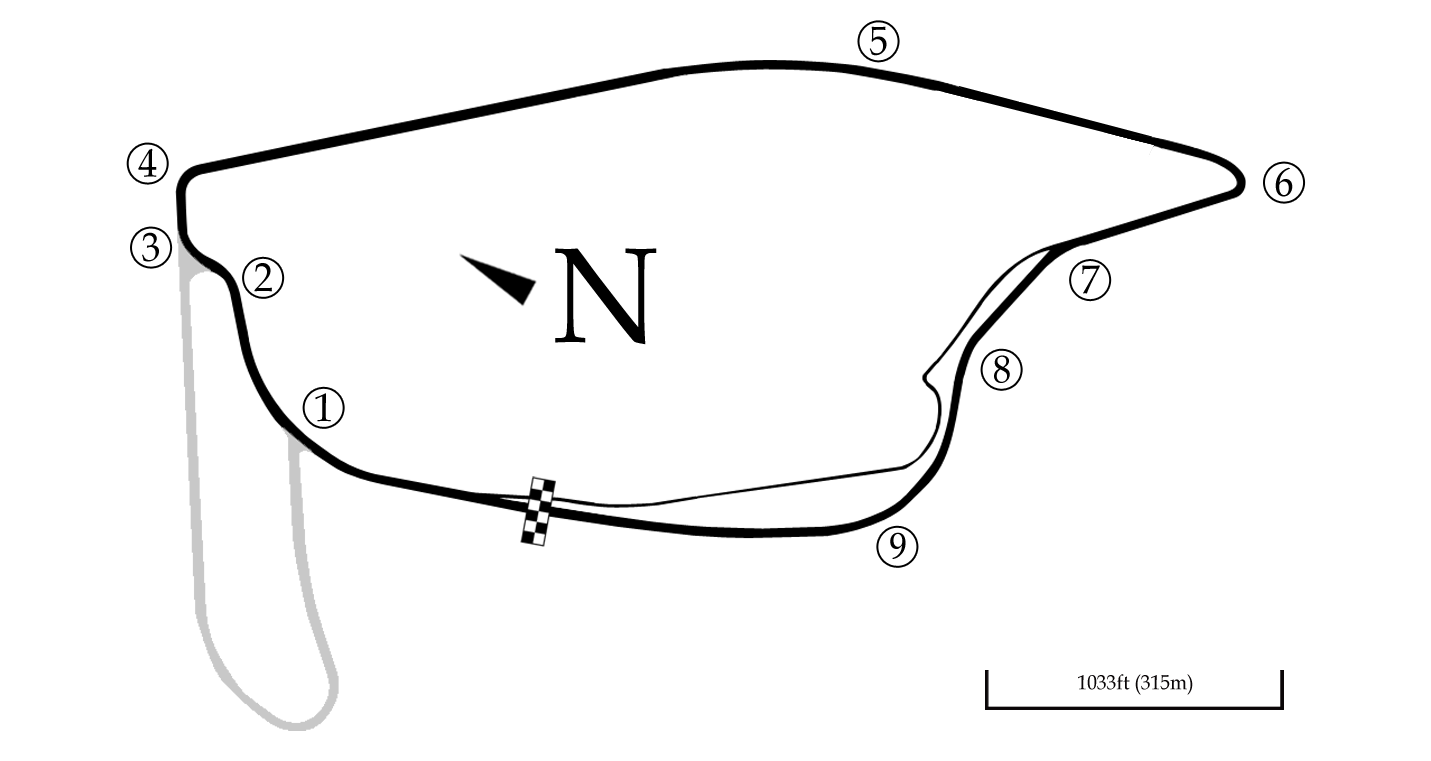

Race details
- Date: 2 December 2000
- Official name: XLVI New Zealand Grand Prix
- Location: Pukekohe Park Raceway, Pukekohe, New Zealand
- Course: Permanent racing facility
- Course length: 2.841 km (1.765 miles)
- Distance: 40 laps, 113.64 km (70.60 miles)
- Weather: Fine

Pole position
Driver	(New Zealand) Simon Wills	Birrana Racing
- Time: 52.777

Fastest lap
Driver	(New Zealand) Matt Halliday	NRC International
- Time: 53.587 on lap 34

Podium
First	(New Zealand) Andy Booth	NRC International
Second	(New Zealand) Matt Halliday	NRC International
Third	(Australia) Paul Dumbrell	Wynns Racing

The 2000 New Zealand Grand Prix event for open wheel racing cars was held at Pukekohe Park Raceway near Auckland on 2 December 2000. It was the forty-sixth New Zealand Grand Prix and was open to Formula Holden cars. This was the first time the marque event had been held at the Pukekohe circuit since 1991, and following the demolition of the circuit in 2023, it would also prove to be the last time the event would be held here.

The race was won by New Zealand driver Andy Booth driving a Reynard 95D belonging to the Arthur Abrahams-run NRC International. Booth's teammate Matt Halliday finished second ahead of Australian driver Paul Dumbrell finished third.

The event was also the final race of that years Tasman Cup. It would also prove to be the final race in the revived Tasman Series established in 1998 for Formula Holden as it would be discontinued for 2001.

== Race report ==
Simon Wills entered the weekend as the favourite, having won the previous two iterations of the event. He backed this up by securing pole position by nearly eight tenths over his teammate, LeRoy Stevenson. He further cemented his form by winning the preliminary race on early Sunday.

Wills romped off the line into an early lead while Andy Booth passed Stevenson for second place on the opening lap. American driver Emerson Newton-John also enjoyed a strong start and was nestled behind Stevenson in fourth place. Stevenson was forced to pit with car issues later in the race while Newton-John spun on the exit of the hairpin and found himself beached on the kerb. While the safety car was deployed to retrieve Newton-John's grief-stricken car, the paddock was shocked with news that Wills had retired from the race after having completely dominated the event up to that point.

This left Booth in the lead with Matt Halliday in second place. Halliday began to set the pace and began to rein Booth in. With a handful of laps to go, Booth descended upon lapped traffic. One of the lapped cars, Ian Lloyd, was lapping considerably slower than anybody else on track. When Booth reached him, the pace disparity caused the race leader to check up. This caught out a fast-approaching Halliday who spun exiting turn four in a bid to avoid crashing into the rear of Booth's car.

This left Booth with a clear run to the finish. He would take the chequered flag to win the New Zealand Grand Prix and the Tasman Cup. Halliday recovered from his spin to take second place while Australian driver Paul Dumbrell rounded out the podium.

== Classification ==
=== Qualifying ===
Pos	No.	Driver	Team	Time	Grid
1	1	(New Zealand) Simon Wills	Birrana Racing	0:52.777	1
2	8	(New Zealand) LeRoy Stevenson	Birrana Racing	0:53.528	2
3	20	(New Zealand) Andy Booth	NRC International	0:53.536	3
4	19	(New Zealand) Matt Halliday	NRC International	0:53.943	4
5	7	(Australia) Paul Dumbrell	Wynns Racing	0:54.013	5
6	22	(United States) Emerson Newton-John	Greg Murphy Racing	0:54.307	6
7	74	(Australia) Steve Owen	Hocking Motorsport	0:54.497	7
8	66	(Australia) Peter Hill	Greg Murphy Racing	0:55.008	8
9	75	(Australia) Stuart Kostera	Hocking Motorsport	0:55.306	9
10	28	(Australia) Roger Oakeshott	Sportsmed Racing	0:55.634	10
11	17	(Australia) Mark Ellis	Mantis Racing	0:55.794	11
12	27	(Australia) Terry Clearihan		0:56.564	12
13	24	(Australia) Ian Peters	Camtech Racing	0:56.680	13
14	18	(New Zealand) Dean Cockerton		0:57.218	14
15	10	(New Zealand) Ian Lloyd		0:58.756	15

=== Race ===
Pos	No.	Driver	Team	Laps	Time/Retired	Grid
1	20	(New Zealand) Andy Booth	NRC International	40	38min 25.383sec	3
2	19	(New Zealand) Matt Halliday	NRC International	40	+ 13.445 s	4
3	7	(Australia) Paul Dumbrell	Wynns Racing	40	+ 16.523 s	5
4	74	(Australia) Steve Owen	Hocking Motorsport	40	+ 17.723 s	7
5	66	(Australia) Peter Hill	Greg Murphy Racing	40	+ 32.020 s	8
6	75	(Australia) Stuart Kostera	Hocking Motorsport	40	+ 45.313 s	9
7	8	(New Zealand) LeRoy Stevenson	Birrana Racing	39	+ 1 lap	2
8	18	(New Zealand) Dean Cockerton		39	+ 1 lap	14
9	24	(Australia) Ian Peters	Camtech Racing	39	+ 1 lap	13
10	17	(Australia) Mark Ellis	Mantis Racing	36	+ 4 laps	11
11	22	(United States) Emerson Newton-John	Greg Murphy Racing	35	+ 5 laps	6
Ret	10	(New Zealand) Ian Lloyd		27	Retired	15
Ret	1	(New Zealand) Simon Wills	Birrana Racing	17	Retired	1
Ret	28	(Australia) Roger Oakeshott	Sportsmed Racing	7	Retired	10
DNS	27	(Australia) Terry Clearihan			Did Not Start	12

Preceded by 1999 New Zealand Grand Prix	New Zealand Grand Prix; 2000	Succeeded by 2002 New Zealand Grand Prix
