= Daniel Gaunt =

New Zealand racing driver

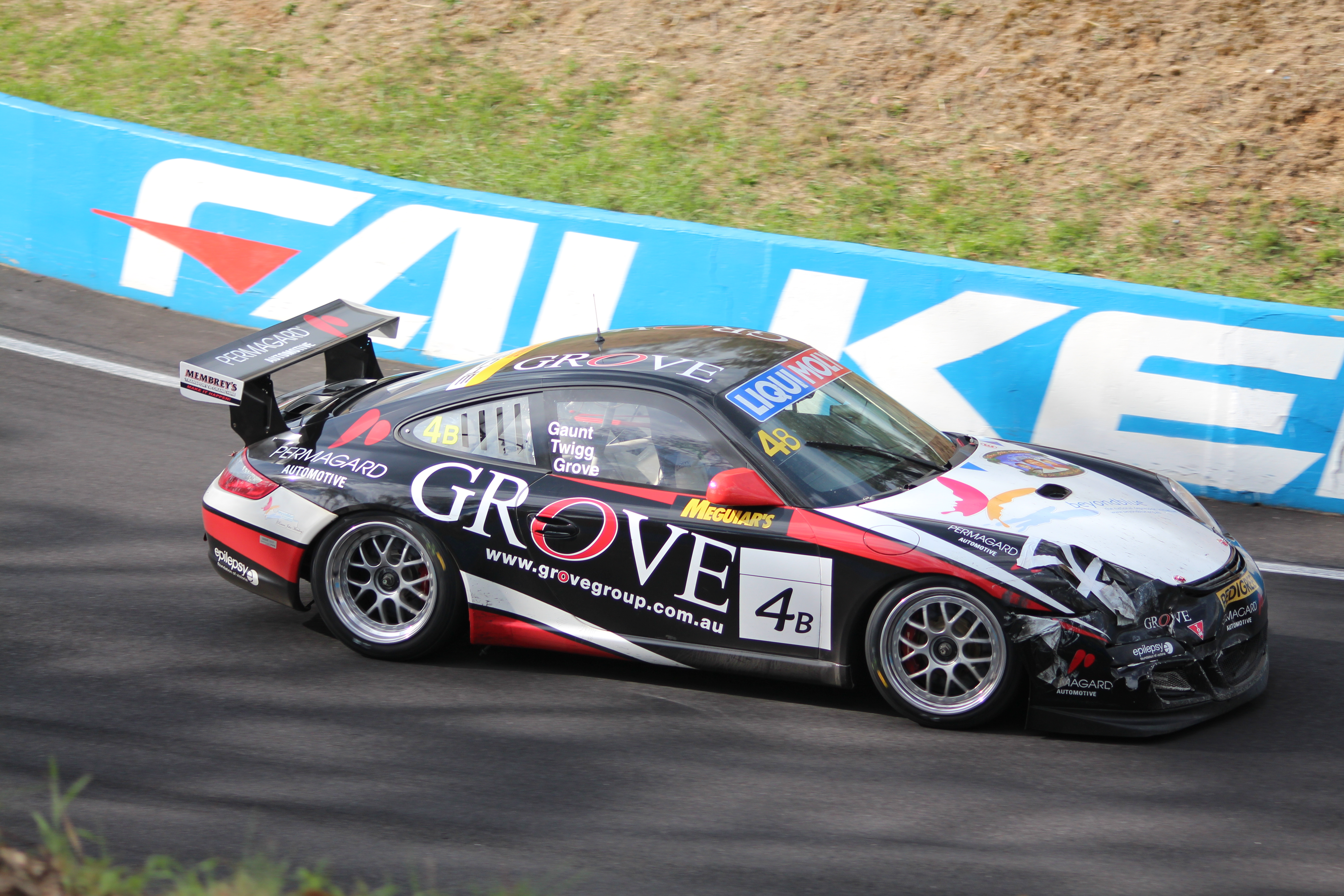
- Nationality: New Zealander
- Born: Daniel Thomas Gaunt; 27 February 1985 (age 41) Auckland, New Zealand
- Categorisation: FIA Silver

Supercars Championship career
- Current team: Kelly Racing
- Championships: 0
- Races: 26
- Wins: 2
- Podiums: 0
- Pole positions: 0
- 2011 position: 48th (219 points)

Daniel Thomas Gaunt (born 27 February 1985 in Auckland) is a New Zealand racing driver and owner of Game Over Auckland.

== Formula Racing ==
After rising through the ranks of New Zealand Formula Ford, which included a third-place finish in the 2002 New Zealand Grand Prix, Gaunt moved to Australia, competing in the Formula 4000 category and winning the 2003 Australian Drivers' Championship. With Formula 4000 collapsing, the title did not lead anywhere and Gaunt returned to New Zealand. After a win in the 2004 Lady Wigram Trophy driving a Dallara F3, Gaunt moved on to compete in the inaugural Toyota Racing Series, finishing third in the final standings. A season in Champ Car Atlantics followed with the Paul Newman owned Newman/Wachs Racing. After single race as the back-up driver for A1 Team New Zealand, Gaunt returned to New Zealand Gaunt won the 2006 Toyota Racing Series title.

== Sedan Racing ==
Drives in 2008 proved slim with guest drives in Toyota Racing Series, Australian Carrera Cup and a late season drive with Team Kiwi Racing in V8 Supercars. Over the 2008/09 NZ motor racing summer season Gaunt competed in the Porsche GT3 Cup Challenge with the XXX Motorsport team, finishing third overall and then stepped up to a full-time drive for McElrea Racing in the Australian Fujitsu Development Series. From there, he was recruited by Lucas Dumbrell Motorsport to drive in the 2010 V8 Supercar Championship Series but was replaced mid season. In 2011, he was driving for Stone Brothers Racing satellite team James Rosenberg Racing for the Phillip Island and Bathurst endurance races.

== Career results ==
Season	Series	Position	Car	Team
2001	New Zealand South Island Formula Ford	1st		
2003	Australian Drivers' Championship	1st	Reynard 92D Holden; Reynard 96D Holden; Reynard 94D Holden	Pure Power Racing; Ralt Australia
2004	Lady Wigram Trophy	1st	Dallara F301 Spiess Opel	Team BRM
2005	Toyota Racing Series	4th	Tatuus TT104ZZ Toyota	
2005–06	Toyota Racing Series	1st	Tatuus TT104ZZ Toyota	
2006	Champ Car Atlantic Championship	24th	Swift 016.a Mazda-Cosworth	Newman/Wachs Racing
2006	Indy Pro Series	31st	Dallara IPS Infiniti	Brian Stewart Racing
2006–07	Toyota Racing Series	1st	Tatuus TT104ZZ Toyota	
2008	V8 Supercar Championship Series	54th	Ford BF Falcon	Team Kiwi Racing
2008–09	Toyota Racing Series	15th	Tatuus TT104ZZ Toyota	
2009	Fujitsu V8 Supercar Series	5th	Ford BF Falcon	McElrea Racing
2009	V8 Supercar Championship Series	41st	Ford FG Falcon	Stone Brothers Racing
2010	V8 Supercar Championship Series	34th	Holden VE Commodore	Lucas Dumbrell Motorsport
2011	Australian GT Championship	13th	Porsche 997 GT3 Cup S Mosler MT900 GT3	Vodka O Racing
2011	Australian Carrera Cup Championship	3rd	Porsche 997 GT3 Cup S	Triple X Motorsport; Melbourne Performance Centre
2011	International V8 Supercars Championship	48th	Ford FG Falcon	James Rosenberg Racing
2012	South Island Endurance Series	1st	Porsche 997 GT3 Cup R	Paul Kelly Motor Company
2012	V8SuperTourer Championship	14th	Ford FG Falcon	Tasman Motorsports Group
2012	Australian Carrera Cup Championship	4th	Porsche 997 GT3 Cup R	Rusty French Racing
2012	International V8 Supercars Championship	50th	Holden VE Commodore	Kelly Racing
2013	South Island Endurance Series	1st	Porsche 997 GT3 Cup R	Paul Kelly Motor Company
2013	V8SuperTourer	6th	Ford FG Falcon	Tasman Motorsports Group; PS Racing
2013	Dunlop V8 Supercar Series	11th	Holden VE Commodore; Ford FG Falcon	Eggleston Motorsport; Evans Motorsport Group
2013	International V8 Supercars Championship	50th	Nissan Altima	Nissan Motorsport
2014	Australian Carrera Cup Championship	-	Porsche 991 GT3 Cup	McElrea Racing
2014	Australian GT Championship - GT Trophy Class	5th	Lamborghini Gallardo (LP 520)	Team JJ Racing
2015	Australian Carrera Cup Championship	-	Porsche 991 GT3 Cup	Tony Bates Racing
2015	Australian GT Championship - GT Trophy Class	11th	Audi R8 LMS	
2014–15	V8SuperTourers	29th	Ford Falcon (FG)	PSR Racing
2016	Australian Production Car Series	32nd	Mitsubishi Lancer RS Evo X	Melbourne Performance Centre
2016	Australian GT Championship	17th	Aston Martin V12 Vantage GT3; McLaren 650S GT3	Keltic Racing
2017	Porsche Carrera Cup Australia	22nd	Porsche 991 GT3 Cup	Bulk Motorworks
2017	Australian GT Championship	24th	Audi R8 LMS	Melbourne Performance Centre
2018	Australian GT Championship	8th	Audi R8 LMS	Audi Sport Customer Racing

=== American open-wheel racing ===
==== Champ Car Atlantic ====
Year	Team	1	2	3	4	5	6	7	8	9	10	11	12	Rank	Points
2006	Newman Wachs Racing	LBH; 20	HOU; DNS	MTY; 15	POR; 8	CLE1; 22	CLE2; 21	TOR	EDM	SJO	DEN	MTL	ROA	24th	22

==== Indy Pro Series ====
Year	Team	1	2	3	4	5	6	7	8	9	10	11	12	Rank	Points	Ref
2006	Brian Stewart Racing	HMS	STP1	STP2	INDY	WGL	IMS	NSH	MIL	KTY	SNM1; 14	SNM2; 9	CHI	31st	38	

=== Complete V8 Supercar results ===
Year	Team	Car	1	2	3	4	5	6	7	8	9	10	11	12	13	14	15	16	17	18	19	20	21	22	23	24	25	26	27	28	29	30	31	32	33	34	35	36	37	Final pos	Points
2008	Team Kiwi Racing	Ford BF Falcon	ADE	ECK	HAM	PTH	SAN	HDV	QLD	WIN	PHI	BAT	SUR	BHR	SYM; 26	OPK; 26																								54th	112
2009	Stone Brothers Racing	Ford FG Falcon	ADE; R1	ADE; R2	HAM; R3	HAM; R4	WIN; R5	WIN; R6	SYM; R7	SYM; R8	HDV; R9	HDV; R10	TOW; R11	TOW; R12	SAN; R13	SAN; R14	QLD; R15	QLD; R16	PHI; Q 21	PHI; R17; 17	BAT; R18; 19	SUR; R19	SUR; R20	PHI; R21	PHI; R22	PTH; R23	PTH; R22	SYD; R23	SYD; R24											41st	213
2010	Lucas Dumbrell Motorsport	Holden VE Commodore	YMC; R1; 22	YMC; R2; 24	BHR; R3; 26	BHR; R4; 23	ADE; R5; 18	ADE; R6; 25	HAM; R7; 19	HAM; R8; 17	QLD; R9; 17	QLD; R10; 18	WIN; R11; 25	WIN; R12; 19	HDV; R13; 26	HDV; R14; 28	TOW; R15	TOW; R16	PHI; R17	BAT; R18	SUR; R19	SUR; R20	SYM; R21	SYM; R22	SAN; R23	SAN; R24	SYD; R25	SYD; R26												34th	539
2011	James Rosenberg Racing	Ford FG Falcon	YMC; R1	YMC; R2	ADE; R3	ADE; R4	HAM; R5	HAM; R6	PER; R7	PER; R8	PER; R9	WIN; R10; PO	WIN; R11; PO	HDV; R12	HDV; R13	TOW; R14; PO	TOW; R15; PO	QLD; R16; PO	QLD; R17; PO	QLD; R18; PO	PHI; Q 21	PHI; R19; 24	BAT; R20; 12	SUR; R21	SUR; R22	SYM; R23	SYM; R24	SAN; R25	SAN; R26	SYD; R27	SYD; R28									48th	219
2012	Kelly Racing	Holden VE Commodore	ADE; R1	ADE; R2	SYM; R3	SYM; R4	HAM; R5	HAM; R6	PER; R7	PER; R8	PER; R9	PHI; R10; PO	PHI; R11; PO	HDV; R12	HDV; R13	TOW; R14; PO	TOW; R15; PO	QLD; R16; PO	QLD; R17; PO	SMP; R18	SMP; R19	SAN; Q 24	SAN; R20; 20	BAT; R21; 19	SUR; R22	SUR; R23	YMC; R24	YMC; R25	YMC; R26	WIN; R27	WIN; R28	SYD; R29	SYD; R30							50th	177
2013	Nissan Motorsport	Nissan Altima L33	ADE; R1	ADE; R2	SYM; R3	SYM; R4	SYM; R5	PUK; R6	PUK; R7	PUK; R8	PUK; R9	BAR; R10	BAR; R11	BAR; R12	COTA; R13	COTA; R14	COTA; R15	COTA; R16	HID; R17	HID; R18	HID; R19	TOW; R20	TOW; R21	QLD; R22; PO	QLD; R23; PO	QLD; R24; PO	WIN; R25; PO	WIN; R26; PO	WIN; R27; PO	SAN; Q 19	SAN; R28; 20	BAT; R29; 15	SUR; R30; Ret	SUR; R31; 10	PHI; R32	PHI; R33	PHI; R34	SYD; R35	SYD; R36	50th	228

=== Complete Bathurst 1000 results ===
Year	Team	Car	Co-driver	Position	Laps
2009	Stone Brothers Racing	Ford Falcon (FG)	(New Zealand) John McIntyre	19th	160
2011	James Rosenberg Racing	Ford Falcon (FG)	(Australia) Tim Slade	12th	161
2012	Kelly Racing	Holden Commodore (VE)	(Australia) Karl Reindler	19th	161
2013	Nissan Motorsport	Nissan Altima (L33)	(Australia) Michael Caruso	25th	147

Sporting positions
Preceded by Will Power	Winner of the Australian Drivers' Championship; 2003	Succeeded by Neil McFadyen
Preceded by Brent Collins	Toyota Racing Series; Champion; 2005–06 & 2006–07	Succeeded by Andy Knight
Preceded by Hamad Al Fardan	Winner of the New Zealand Grand Prix; 2007	Succeeded by Andy Knight
Preceded by Andy Knight	Winner of the New Zealand Grand Prix; 2009	Succeeded by Earl Bamber
