= Ken Smith (racing driver) =

New Zealand racing driver

Ken Smith MBE
- Nationality: (New Zealand) New Zealander
- Full name: Kenneth James Smith
- Born: 11 August 1941 (age 85)

Kenneth James Smith MBE (born 11 August 1941) is a New Zealand motor racing driver, who won the New Zealand Grand Prix in 1976, 1990, and 2004.

Smith first competed in motor racing in 1958, winning the New Zealand Hill Climb championship when he was 16. He progressed to single seater racing in 1962, first driving a Lola March T, Formula Junior car. Later he raced in Formula Ford, Formula 5000, Formula Pacific, Formula Mondial, and Toyota Racing Series among others

Smith won the Gold Star Drivers Award in the 1975–1976, 1983–1984, 1984–1985, 1986–1987 and 1989–1990 seasons. In 2011, Smith won the Formula 5000 Revival championship for the third time. As well as his victories in New Zealand, Smith also won the Penang Grand Prix three times, the Selangor Grand Prix twice, and the Malaysian Grand Prix once.

In 2021, Smith took part in his 50th New Zealand Grand Prix at age 79, during his 63rd consecutive season of racing. Smith also mentored current Racing Bulls Formula 1 driver Liam Lawson in his early career.

== Honours and awards ==
Smith was appointed a Member of the Order of the British Empire in the 1987 Queen's Birthday Honours, for services to motorsport, and in 1995 was inducted into the New Zealand Motorsport Hall of Fame. In 2008, he received the Motorsport Personality of the Year award. In 2010, he received a Motorsport New Zealand Special Award given in recognition of his pivotal role in motorsport.

== Racing Record ==
=== NZ F5000 Tasman Revival Series ===
Year	Entrant	Chassis	Engine	1	2	3	4	5	6	7	8	9	10	11	12	13	14	15	16	17	18	Position	Points
2014/15	Ken Smith Motorsport	Lola T332	Chevrolet	SAN; R1	SAN; R2	SAN; R3	SMSP; R1	SMSP; R2	SMSP; R3	HAM; R1; 1	HAM; R2; 1	HAM; R3; 1	HAM2; R1; 1	HAM2; R2; 1	HAM2; R3; 1	RUA; R1	RUA; R2	RUA; R3	MAN; R1; 1	MAN; R2; 1	MAN; R3; 1	N/A	0**
2015/16	Ken Smith Motorsport	Lola T332	Chevrolet	MAN; R1; 1	MAN; R2; 1	MAN; R3; 1	HAM; R1; 1	HAM; R2; 1	HAM; R3; 1	RUA; R1; 1	RUA; R2; 1	RUA; R3; 1	MAN2; R1; 1	MAN2; R2; 1	MAN2; R3; 1	PHI; R1; 2	PHI; R2; 2	PHI; R3; 3	PHI; R4; 3			**1st**	?
2016/17	Ken Smith Motorsport	Lola T332	Chevrolet	BAR; R1	BAR; R2	BAR; R3	SAN; R1	SAN; R2	SAN; R3	HAM; R1; 1	HAM; R2; 1	HAM; R3; 1	TAU; R1; 1	TAU; R2; 3	TAU; R3; 1	RUA; R1; 1	RUA; R2; 1	RUA; R3; 2				N/A	0**
2017/18	Ken Smith Motorsport	Lola T332	Chevrolet	PUK; R1; DNS	PUK; R2; DNF	PUK; R3; DNS	MAN; R1	MAN; R2	MAN; R3	TAU; R1; 1	TAU; R2; 2	TAU; R3; 2	HAM; R1; 1	HAM; R2; 1	HAM; R3; 1	RUA; R1; DNF	RUA; R2; DNS	RUA; R3; DNS	PHI; R1	PHI; R2	PHI; R3	12th	272
2018/19	Ken Smith Motorsport	Lola T332	Chevrolet	PUK; R1; 1	PUK; R2; 1	PUK; R3; 1	TAU; R1; 1	TAU; R2; 1	TAU; R3; 1	HAM; R1	HAM; R2	HAM; R3	RUA; R1	RUA; R2	RUA; R3	HAM; R1	HAM; R2	HAM; R3				**1st**	208

- * Season Still in progress
- ** Needed to compete at all rounds to be classified for points

=== Complete Toyota Racing Series results ===
(key) (Races in bold indicate pole position) (Races in italics indicate fastest lap)

Year	Team	1	2	3	4	5	6	7	8	9	10	11	12	13	14	15	16	17	18	19	20	21	DC	Points
2007–08	Ken Smith Motorsport	PUK; 1; 5	PUK; 2; 10	PUK; 3; 12	RUA; 1; 13	RUA; 2; 11	RUA; 3; 13	MAN; 1; 16	MAN; 2; 12	MAN; 3; 11	TAU; 1; 16	TAU; 2; 15	TAU; 3; 15	MAN; 1; 8	MAN; 2; 8	MAN; 3; 11	TIM; 1; 8	TIM; 2; 8	TIM; 3; 12	TER; 1; 10	TER; 2; 10	TER; 3; 9	9th	652
2008–09	Ken Smith Motorsport	RUA; 1	RUA; 2	RUA; 3	TIM; 1	TIM; 2	TIM; 3	TER; 1	TER; 2	TER; 3	TAU; 1	TAU; 2	TAU; 3	MAN; 1 DNS	MAN; 2; 6	MAN; 3; 7	PUK; 1 Ret	PUK; 2; 7	PUK; 3 Ret				16th	129
2010	Ken Smith Motorsport	TER; 1	TER; 2	TER; 3	TIM; 1	TIM; 2	TIM; 3	HMP; 1; 9	HMP; 2; 7	HMP; 3; 12	MAN; 1; 9	MAN; 2; 8	MAN; 3; 10	TAU; 1	TAU; 2	TAU; 3							13th	214
2011	M2 Competition	TER; 1	TER; 2	TER; 3	TIM; 1	TIM; 2	TIM; 3	HMP; 1	HMP; 2	HMP; 3	MAN; 1; 15	MAN; 2; 13	MAN; 3; 11	TAU; 1	TAU; 2	TAU; 3							17th	78
2012	ETEC Motorsport	TER; 1	TER; 2	TER; 3	TIM; 1	TIM; 2	TIM; 3	TAU; 1	TAU; 2	TAU; 3	HMP; 1	HMP; 2	HMP; 3	MAN; 1; 17	MAN; 2; 17	MAN; 3; 13							21st	62
2013	Giles Motorsport	TER; 1	TER; 2	TER; 3	TIM; 1	TIM; 2	TIM; 3	TAU; 1	TAU; 2	TAU; 3	HMP; 1	HMP; 2	HMP; 3	MAN; 1; 19	MAN; 2; 10	MAN; 3; 16							22nd	67
2018	Victory Motor Racing	RUA; 1	RUA; 2	RUA; 3	TER; 1	TER; 2	TER; 3	HMP; 1	HMP; 2	HMP; 3	TAU; 1	TAU; 2	TAU; 3	MAN; 1; 13	MAN; 2; 13	MAN; 3; 12							14th	80
2019	Giles Motorsport	HIG; 1	HIG; 2	HIG; 3	TER; 1	TER; 2	TER; 3	HMP; 1	HMP; 2	HMP; 3	HMP; 4	TAU; 1	TAU; 2	TAU; 3	TAU; 4	MAN; 1; 13	MAN; 2; 13	MAN; 3; 8					17th	27
2020	Giles Motorsport	HIG; 1	HIG; 2	HIG; 3	TER; 1	TER; 2	TER; 3	HMP; 1	HMP; 2	HMP; 3	PUK; 1	PUK; 2	PUK; 3	MAN; 1; 17	MAN; 2; 19	MAN; 3; 15							21st	10
2021	Giles Motorsport	HD1; 1; 15	HD1; 2 Ret	HD1; 3; 15	HD2; 1	HD2; 2	MAN; 1	MAN; 2	MAN; 3	MAN; 3													16th	12

Sporting positions
Preceded by Warwick Brown	New Zealand Grand Prix Winner; 1976	Succeeded by Keke Rosberg
Preceded by Dean Hall	New Zealand Grand Prix Winner; 1990	Succeeded by Craig Baird
Preceded by Jonny Reid	New Zealand Grand Prix Winner; 2004	Succeeded by Simon Gamble
