= Teretonga Park =

Race track in Invercargill, New Zealand

- Grand Prix Circuit (1966–present)
- Location: Invercargill, New Zealand
- Coordinates: 46°26′26″S 168°15′39″E
- FIA Grade: 3
- Owner: Southland Sports Car Club
- Broke ground: November 1953; 72 years ago
- Opened: November 1957; 68 years ago
- Major events: Current: FR Oceania (2005–2020, 2023, 2025–present); GR86 Championship New Zealand (2015–2020, 2023, 2025–present); Former: D1NZ (2025); New Zealand Grand Prix (2002–2007); New Zealand V8 (2000, 2003–2019); Tasman Series (1964–1975)

Grand Prix Circuit (1966–present)
- Length: 2.570 km (1.597 mi)
- Turns: 7
- Race lap record: 0:51.206 ( (New Zealand) Greg Murphy, Reynard 92D, 1998, Formula Holden)

Original Circuit (1957–1966)
- Length: 2.414 km (1.500 mi)
- Turns: 8
- Race lap record: 1:01.800 ( (United Kingdom) Jim Clark, Lotus 32B, 1965, F2)

Teretonga (meaning "Swift South" in Māori) is a 2.570 km (1.597 mi) motor racing circuit situated 8 km (5.0 mi) south-west of Invercargill, New Zealand. It is home of the Southland Sports Car Club. The circuit was established in 1957 and was the southernmost FIA-recognised race track in the world prior to 2023; it has now been succeeded by the Autódromo Enrique Freile in Argentine Patagonia. It is also the country's oldest purpose-built venue.

Regular racing programme includes rounds of the local Clubmans Series; featuring rounds of South Island Racing Registers and a very large Classic Car meeting in February of each year. The circuit is also used for Sprints and Motorkhanas. Other clubs run Motor Cycle and Drag Races at Teretonga. Regarded by many drivers as the best and safest track in the country, it has been up-graded on a continual basis.

== History ==
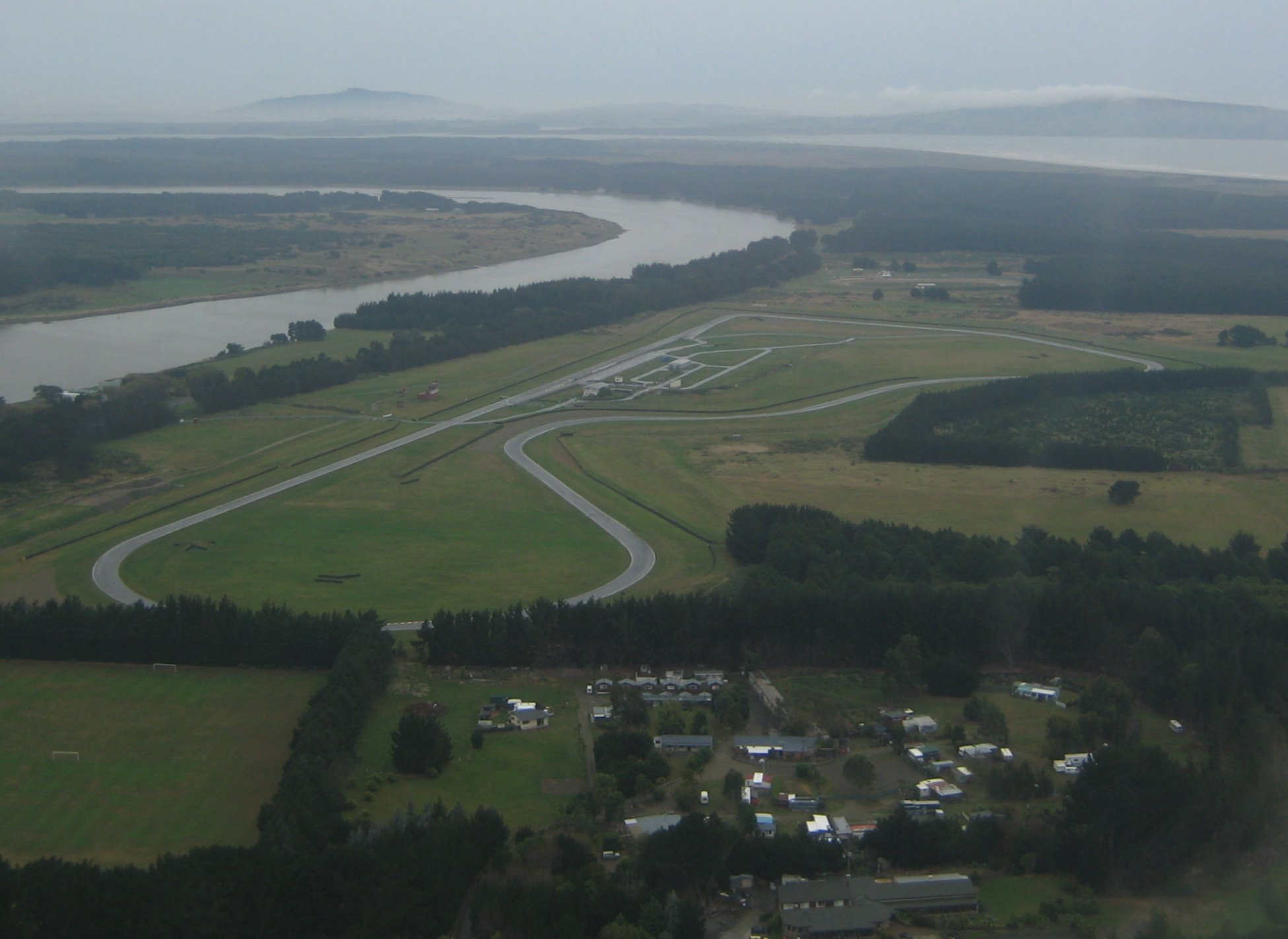
Teretonga Park viewed from the air

- Since 1948, the Southland Sports Car Club Inc. has been one of the leading Clubs in the country. The Club entered the International motor race series in 1956 with the fastest-ever motor race on a road circuit at Ryal Bush. This led to the construction of Teretonga Park in 1957 at Sandy Point, the second purpose-built motor racing track in New Zealand. It was extended to its present configuration in December 1966.
- In the golden age of NZ Motor Racing in the '60s and '70s, Teretonga hosted many of the world's greatest drivers for example, (Stirling Moss), Jim Clark, Graham Hill, Jackie Stewart, Jack Brabham, Bruce McLaren, Denny Hulme, Chris Amon, Phil Hill, the list goes on. There is a fine display of memorabilia in the Clubrooms.
- Since 1981, the club has been actively engaged in the New Zealand Rally Championship.
- On 29 November 1998, the current outright lap record was set by Greg Murphy in a Formula Holden Reynard 92D The time was 0:51.206 at an average lap speed of 184 km/h (114 mph).
- The New Zealand Grand Prix was first held on Teretonga in 13 January 2002. A record number of entries were received for this event, and it had been held at Teretonga for 6 years until 13 January 2007
- On 16 February to Sunday 17 February 2008, the "Leitch Motorsport/Southland Times Speed Fest", which was one of the events of Southern Festival of Speed, was held at Teretonga.

== The circuit ==
As of 2025, a lap was 2.570 km (1.597 mi) long, and run in anticlockwise direction with an 800 m (870 yd) main straight and a very high speed loop with multiple apexes. It flows smoothly from turns 1 through to 5. The circuit is exposed to a strong sea breeze and often forces gearbox and setup changes.

=== Lap records ===
The official lap record for the Teretonga Park is 0:51.206, set by Greg Murphy in 29 November 1998. As of January 2026, the fastest official race lap records at the Teretonga Park are listed as:

Category	Time	Driver	Vehicle	Date
Full Circuit: 2.570 km (1.597 mi) (December 1966–present)
Formula Holden	0:51.206	Greg Murphy	Reynard 92D	29 November 1998
Toyota Racing Series	0:53.109	Lance Stroll	Tatuus FT-50	24 January 2015
Formula Regional	0:53.660	Ugo Ugochukwu	Tatuus FT-60	25 January 2026
Formula 5000	0:53.762	Michael Collins	McRae GM1	17 February 2019
GT3	0:54.428	Andrew Fawcett	McLaren 720S GT3	24 September 2022
Group 7	0:56.040	Jay Esterer	McLaren M6B	10 February 2008
Tasman Formula	0:58.000	Piers Courage	Brabham BT24	25 January 1969
Porsche Carrera Cup	0:58.341	David Reynolds	Porsche 911 (997 I) GT3 Cup	18 January 2009
NZ Touring Cars (TLX)	0:59.276	Jack Smith	Holden Commodore (VE)	20 January 2019
TCR Touring Car	1:00.523	James Penrose	Audi RS 3 LMS TCR	24 September 2022
Group 4	1:02.047	Murray Sinclair	Chevron B16	17 February 2013
TA2	1:02.172	Toby Elmiger	Ford Mustang TA2	25 January 2026
Formula Ford	1:02.189	Martin Short	Mygale SJ07a	16 January 2010
NZ Touring Cars (TL)	1:02.263	John McIntyre	Ford Falcon (BA)	16 January 2005
Group 5	1:02.470	Tom Malloy	Lola T70	2 October 2002
Toyota 86 Championship	1:07.148	Nick Cassidy	Toyota 86	25 January 2015
Original Circuit: 2.414 km (1.500 mi) (November 1957–December 1966)
Tasman Formula	1:01.800	Jim Clark	Lotus 32B	30 January 1965
Sports car racing	1:17.200	Archie Scott-Brown	Lister Knobbly	8 February 1958
