= Reynard F3000 cars =

The Reynard F3000 cars are open-wheeled Formula 3000 cars, designed and developed by Malcolm Oastler, and constructed and built by British manufacturer Reynard Motorsport.

== 88D ==
Reynard 88D
- Category: Formula 3000
- Constructor: Reynard Motorsport
- Successor: Reynard 89D

Technical specifications
- Chassis: Carbon fiber composite monocoque
- Suspension (front): Wishbone, coil springs, rocker arms, push-rod
- Suspension (rear): Wishbone, coil springs, rocker arms, push-rod
- Engine: Mid-engine, longitudinally mounted, 3.0 L (183.1 cu in), Ford-Cosworth, 90° V8, NA; Mid-engine, longitudinally mounted, 3.0 L (183.1 cu in), Mugen, 90° V8, NAMid-engine, longitudinally mounted, 3.0 L (183.1 cu in), Judd, 90° V8, NA; Mid-engine, longitudinally mounted, 3.0 L (183.1 cu in), Cosworth-Yamaha, 90° V8, NA
- Transmission: Reynard/Hewland 5-speed manual
- Power: 450 hp (336 kW)
- Weight: 540 kg (1,190 lb)
- Tyres: Avon

Competition history

The Reynard 88D was built for the 1988 International Formula 3000 Championship and 1988 Japanese Formula 3000 Championship, and was later used in the 1989 British Formula 3000 Championship.

== 89D ==
Reynard 89D
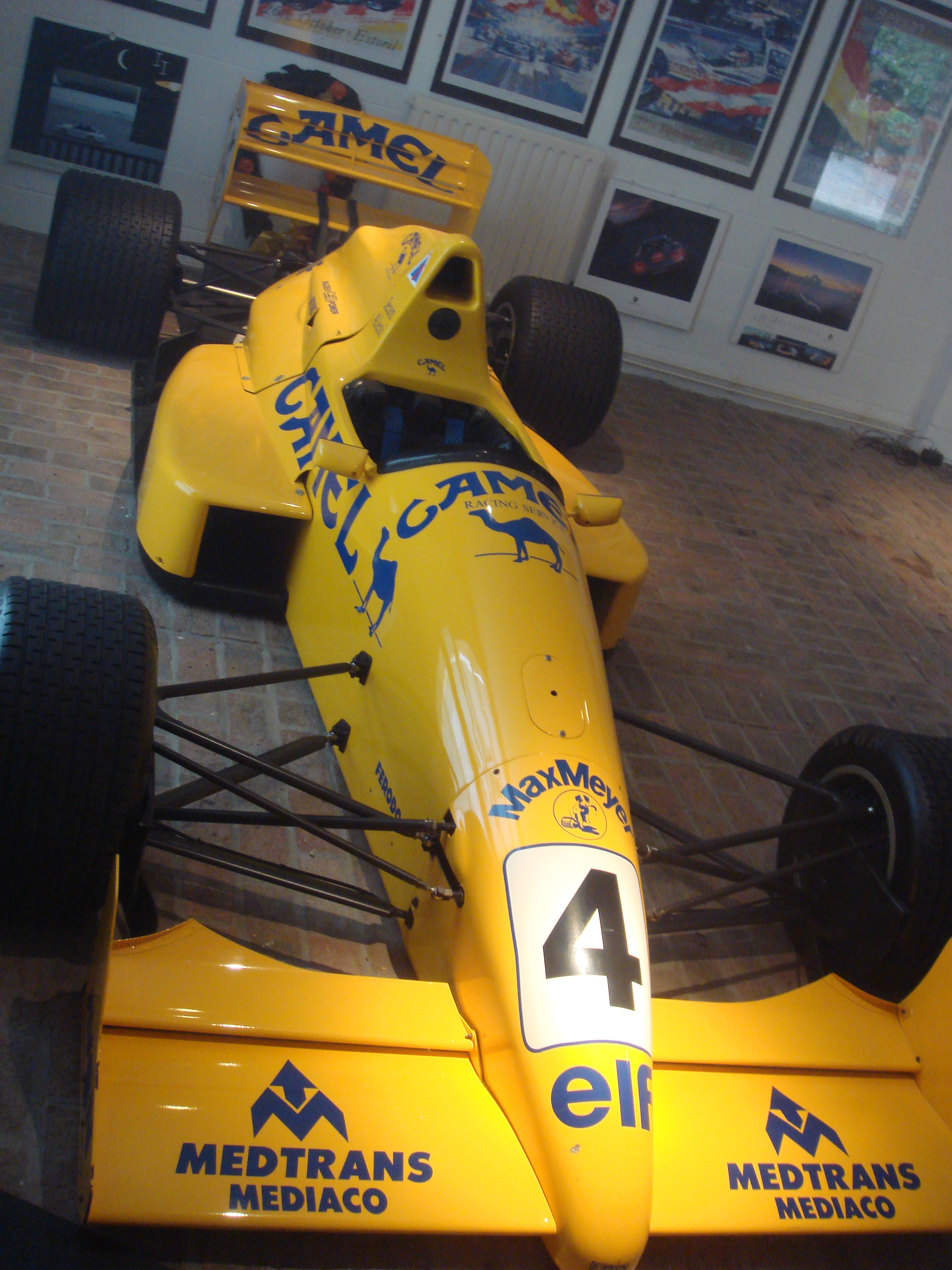
- Category: Formula 3000
- Constructor: Reynard Motorsport
- Predecessor: Reynard 88D
- Successor: Reynard 90D

Technical specifications
- Chassis: Carbon fiber composite monocoque
- Suspension (front): Wishbone, coil springs, rocker arms, push-rod
- Suspension (rear): Wishbone, coil springs, rocker arms, push-rod
- Axle track: Front: 1,684 mm (66.3 in); Rear: 1,564 mm (61.6 in)
- Wheelbase: 2,828 mm (111.3 in)
- Engine: Mid-engine, longitudinally mounted, 3.0 L (183.1 cu in), Ford-Cosworth, 90° V8, NA; Mid-engine, longitudinally mounted, 3.0 L (183.1 cu in), Mugen MF308, 90° V8, NA; Mid-engine, longitudinally mounted, 3.0 L (183.1 cu in), Judd, 90° V8, NA
- Transmission: Reynard/Hewland 5-speed manual
- Power: 450 hp (336 kW)
- Weight: 540 kg (1,190 lb)
- Tyres: Avon

Competition history
- Debut: Silverstone 1989

The Reynard 89D was built for the 1989 International Formula 3000 Championship and 1989 Japanese Formula 3000 Championship. The 89D used one of three different 3.0 L (180 cu in) V8 engines; a Mugen, a Ford-Cosworth, or a Judd.

The model participated in the 1989 season. Thomas Danielsson won the model's debut race at Silverstone, and Jean Alesi became the champion of the series, also driving the 89D.

A modified version of the 89D model, dubbed the 89M, was also constructed. The car was equipped with a Mugen 3.5-liter V8 engine and Formula 1 wheels and served as a test platform for Bridgestone.

== 90D ==
Reynard 90D
- Category: Formula 3000; Formula Holden
- Constructor: Reynard Motorsport
- Predecessor: Reynard 89D
- Successor: Reynard 91D

Technical specifications
- Chassis: Carbon fiber composite monocoque
- Suspension (front): Wishbone, coil springs, rocker arms, push-rod
- Suspension (rear): Wishbone, coil springs, rocker arms, push-rod
- Engine: Mid-engine, longitudinally mounted, 3.0 L (183.1 cu in), Ford-Cosworth, 90° V8, NA; Mid-engine, longitudinally mounted, 3.0 L (183.1 cu in), Mugen MF308, 90° V8, NA; Mid-engine, longitudinally mounted, 3.8 L (231.9 cu in), Buick, 90° V6, NA
- Transmission: Reynard/Hewland 5-speed manual
- Power: 320–450 hp (239–336 kW)
- Weight: 540 kg (1,190 lb)
- Tyres: Avon

Competition history

The Reynard 90D was built for the 1990 International Formula 3000 Championship and 1990 Japanese Formula 3000 Championship, and was later used in the Formula Holden racing series.

== 91D ==
Reynard 91D
- Category: Formula 3000; Formula Holden
- Constructor: Reynard Motorsport
- Predecessor: Reynard 90D
- Successor: Reynard 92D

Technical specifications
- Chassis: Carbon fiber composite monocoque
- Suspension (front): Upper and lower wishbones, coil springs, rocker arms, pull/push-rod
- Suspension (rear): Upper and lower wishbones, coil springs, rocker arms, pull/push-rod
- Axle track: Front: 1,720 mm (68 in); Rear: 1,590 mm (63 in)
- Wheelbase: 2,775 mm (109.3 in)
- Engine: Mid-engine, longitudinally mounted, 3.0 L (183.1 cu in), Ford-Cosworth, 90° V8, NA; Mid-engine, longitudinally mounted, 3.0 L (183.1 cu in), Mugen MF308, 90° V8, NA; Mid-engine, longitudinally mounted, 3.8 L (231.9 cu in), Buick, 90° V6, NA
- Transmission: Reynard/Hewland 5-speed manual
- Power: 320–450 hp (239–336 kW)
- Weight: 1,300 lb (590 kg)
- Tyres: Avon; Dunlop

Competition history

The Reynard 91D was built for the 1991 International Formula 3000 Championship and 1991 Japanese Formula 3000 Championship, and was later used in the British Formula 3000 and Formula Holden racing series.

== 92D ==
Reynard 92D
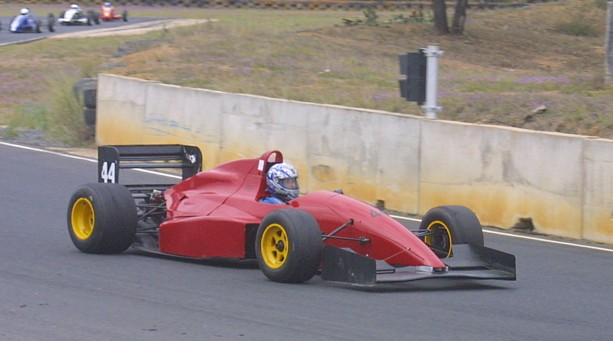
- Category: Formula 3000; Formula Holden
- Constructor: Reynard Motorsport
- Predecessor: Reynard 91D
- Successor: Reynard 93D

Technical specifications
- Chassis: Carbon fiber composite monocoque
- Suspension (front): Upper and lower wishbones, coil springs, rocker arms, pull-rod
- Suspension (rear): Upper and lower wishbones, coil springs, rocker arms, pull-rod
- Axle track: Front: 1,720 mm (68 in); Rear: 1,590 mm (63 in)
- Wheelbase: 2,800 mm (110 in)
- Engine: Mid-engine, longitudinally mounted, 3.0 L (183.1 cu in), Ford-Cosworth, 90° V8, NA; Mid-engine, longitudinally mounted, 3.0 L (183.1 cu in), Mugen MF308, 90° V8, NA; Mid-engine, longitudinally mounted, 3.8 L (231.9 cu in), Buick, 90° V6, NA
- Transmission: Reynard/Hewland 5-speed manual
- Power: 320–450 hp (239–336 kW)
- Weight: 1,300 lb (590 kg)
- Tyres: Avon

Competition history

The Reynard 92D was built for the 1992 International Formula 3000 Championship and 1992 Japanese Formula 3000 Championship, and was later used in the British Formula 3000 and Formula Holden racing series.

== 93D ==
Reynard 93D
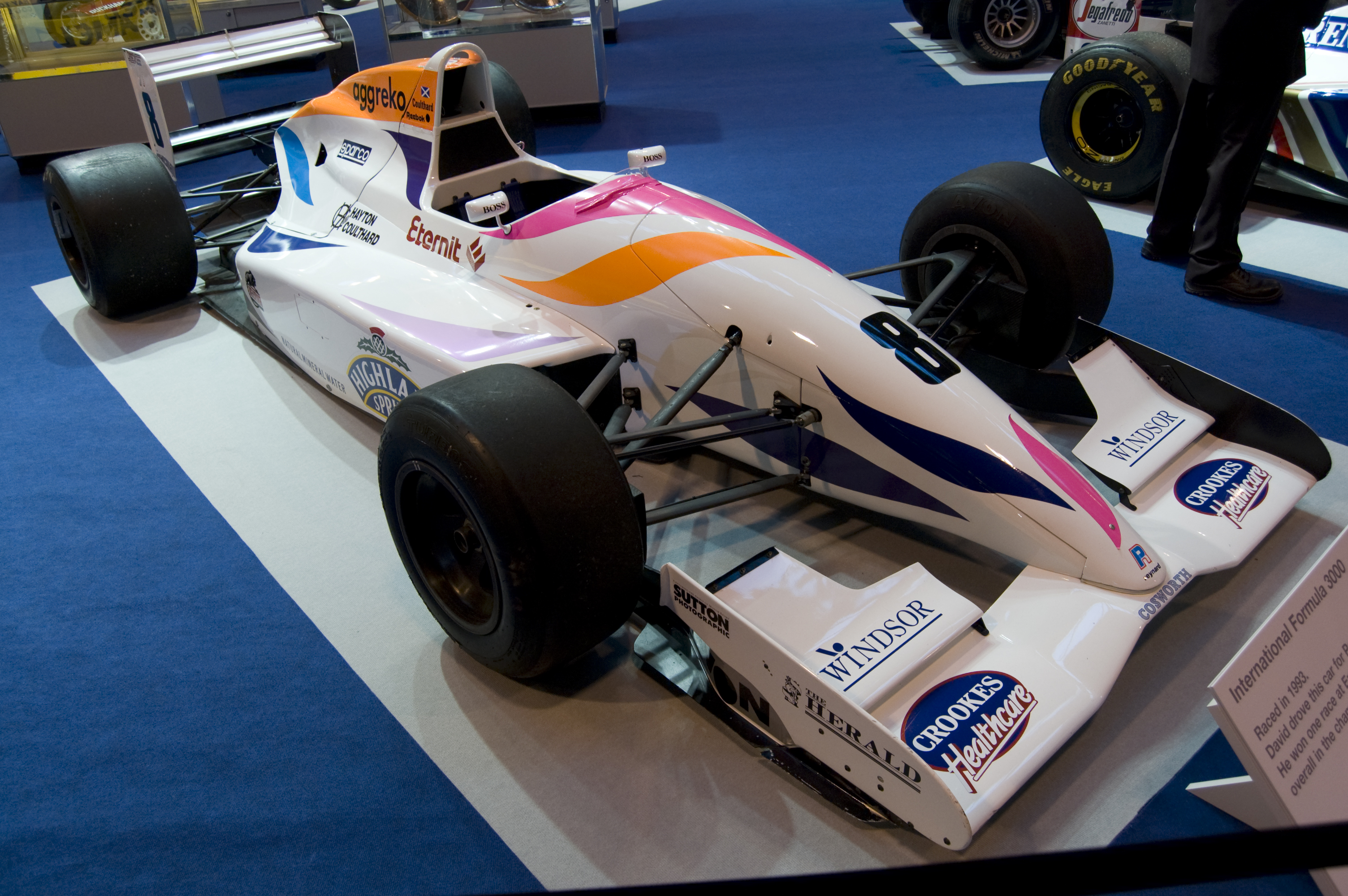
- Category: Formula 3000; Formula Holden
- Constructor: Reynard Motorsport
- Predecessor: Reynard 92D
- Successor: Reynard 94D

Technical specifications
- Chassis: Carbon fiber composite monocoque
- Suspension (front): Upper and lower wishbones, coil springs, rocker arms, pull-rod
- Suspension (rear): Upper and lower wishbones, coil springs, rocker arms, pull-rod
- Engine: Mid-engine, longitudinally mounted, 3.0 L (183.1 cu in), Ford-Cosworth, 90° V8, NA; Mid-engine, longitudinally mounted, 3.0 L (183.1 cu in), Mugen MF308, 90° V8, NA; Mid-engine, longitudinally mounted, 3.8 L (231.9 cu in), Buick, 90° V6, NA
- Transmission: Reynard/Hewland 6-speed sequential manual
- Power: 320–450 hp (239–336 kW)
- Weight: 1,300 lb (590 kg)
- Tyres: Avon

Competition history

The Reynard 93D was built for the 1993 International Formula 3000 Championship and 1993 Japanese Formula 3000 Championship, and was later used in the Formula Holden racing series.

== 94D ==
Reynard 94D
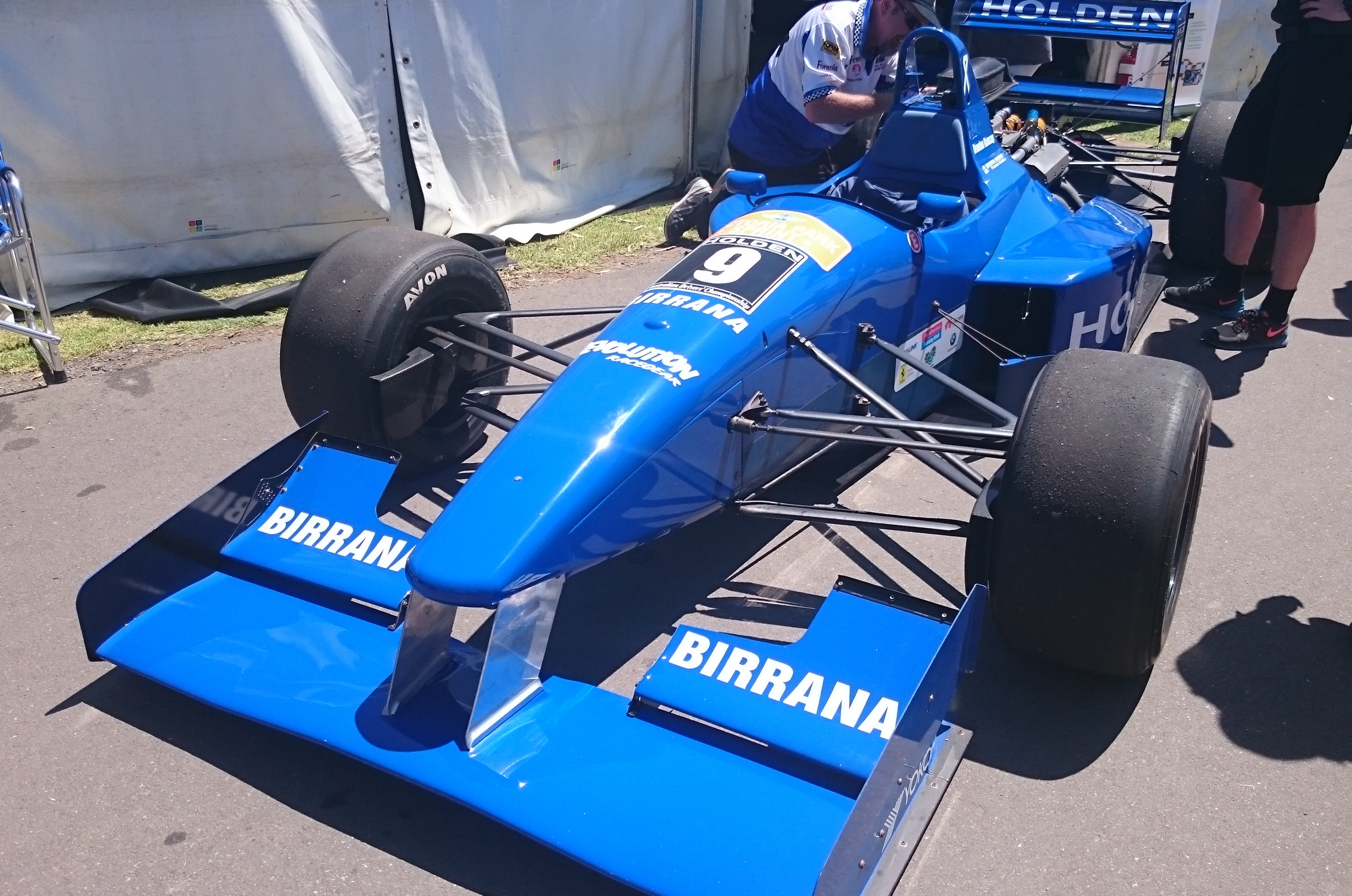
- Category: Formula 3000; Formula Holden
- Constructor: Reynard Motorsport
- Predecessor: Reynard 93D
- Successor: Reynard 95D

Technical specifications
- Chassis: Carbon fiber composite monocoque
- Suspension (front): Upper and lower wishbones, coil springs, rocker arms, pull-rod
- Suspension (rear): Upper and lower wishbones, coil springs, rocker arms, pull-rod
- Engine: Mid-engine, longitudinally mounted, 3.0 L (183.1 cu in), Ford-Cosworth, 90° V8, NA; Mid-engine, longitudinally mounted, 3.0 L (183.1 cu in), Mugen MF308, 90° V8, NA; Mid-engine, longitudinally mounted, 3.8 L (231.9 cu in), Buick, 90° V6, NA
- Transmission: Reynard/Hewland 6-speed sequential manual
- Power: 320–450 hp (239–336 kW)
- Weight: 1,300 lb (590 kg)
- Tyres: Avon; Dunlop

Competition history

The Reynard 94D was built for the 1994 International Formula 3000 Championship and 1994 Japanese Formula 3000 Championship, and was later used in the Formula Holden racing series.

== 95D ==
Reynard 95D
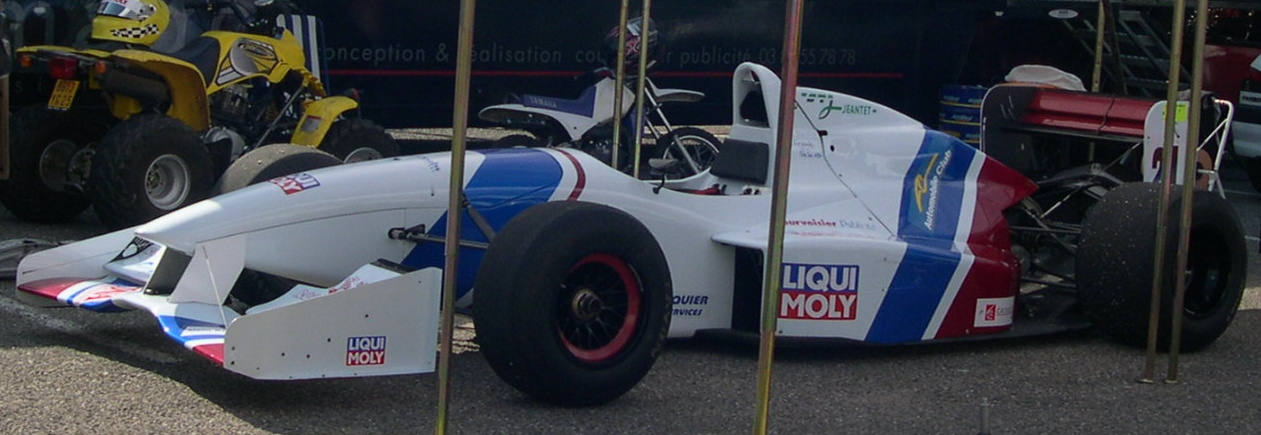
- Category: Formula 3000; Formula Holden
- Constructor: Reynard Motorsport
- Predecessor: Reynard 94D
- Successor: Reynard 96D

Technical specifications
- Chassis: Carbon fiber composite monocoque
- Suspension (front): Upper and lower wishbones, coil springs, rocker arms, pull-rod
- Suspension (rear): Upper and lower wishbones, coil springs, rocker arms, pull-rod
- Engine: Mid-engine, longitudinally mounted, 3.0 L (183.1 cu in), Ford-Cosworth, 90° V8, NA; Mid-engine, longitudinally mounted, 3.0 L (183.1 cu in), Mugen MF308, 90° V8, NA; Mid-engine, longitudinally mounted, 3.8 L (231.9 cu in), Buick, 90° V6, NA
- Transmission: Reynard/Hewland 6-speed sequential manual
- Power: 380–500 hp (283–373 kW)
- Weight: 540 kg (1,190 lb)
- Tyres: Avon; Dunlop

Competition history

The Reynard 95D was built for the 1995 International Formula 3000 Championship and 1995 Japanese Formula 3000 Championship, and was later used in the Formula Holden racing series.
