= 1984 New Zealand Grand Prix =

- 30th New Zealand Grand Prix
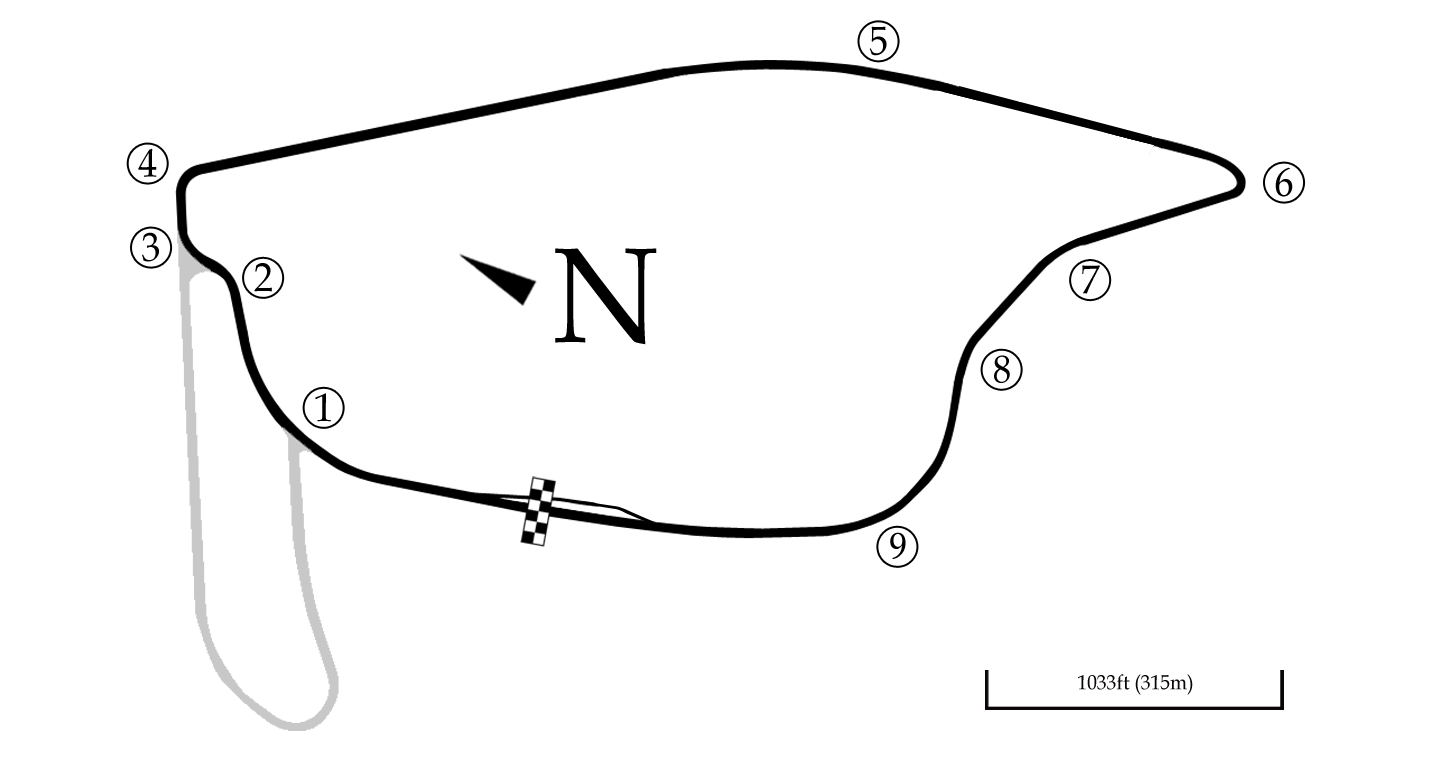

Race details
- Date: 7 January 1984
- Location: Pukekohe Park Raceway, Pukekohe, New Zealand
- Course: Permanent racing facility
- Course length: 2.82 km (1.76 miles)
- Distance: 40 laps, 112.8 km (70.4 miles)

Podium
| First | (United States) Davy Jones | Ralt-Ford |
| Second | (New Zealand) David Oxton | Ralt-Ford |
| Third | (New Zealand) Ken Smith | Ralt-Ford |

The 1984 New Zealand Grand Prix was a race held at the Pukekohe Park Raceway on 7 January 1984. It was the 30th running of the New Zealand Grand Prix and was run as part of the New Zealand Formula Pacific Championship.

The race was won by American Davy Jones. The podium was completed by Kiwi's David Oxton and Kenny Smith.

== Race report ==
Peter Haskett was forced to withdraw from the event after falling ill before the race. Charlie Thomasen would also fail to make the start after incurring an engine failure pre race.

== Classification ==
=== Race ===
| Pos | No. | Driver | Entrant | Car | Laps | Time / Retired |
|---|---|---|---|---|---|---|
| 1 | 1 | (United States) Davy Jones | Graeme Lawrence Racing | Ralt RT4/82 / Ford BDD | 40 | 41min 18.61sec |
| 2 | 18 | (New Zealand) David Oxton | Oxton's C-N-G | Ralt RT4/82 / Ford BDD | 40 | + 10.360 s |
| 3 | 11 | (New Zealand) Ken Smith | Apple Car Company | Ralt RT4/81 / Ford BDD | 40 | + 21.390 s |
| 4 | | (United States) Justin Revene | | Ralt RT4/82 / Ford BDD | 39 | + 1 lap |
| 5 | 41 | (New Zealand) Dave McMillan | | Dart 83M / Ford BDD | 39 | + 1 lap |
| 6 | 2 | (United Kingdom) Ian Flux | Abdex Racing | Ralt RT4/81 / Ford BDD | 38 | + 2 laps |
| 7 | 19 | (New Zealand) Grant Campbell | | Ralt RT4/81 / Ford BDD | 38 | + 2 laps |
| 8 | 9 | (New Zealand) Paul Radisich | Graham Watson Racing | Ralt RT4/83 / Ford BDD | 37 | + 3 laps |
| 9 | | (New Zealand) Ross Cameron | Willowbank Motor Court | March 77B / Ford BDD | 30 | + 10 laps |
| Ret | 17 | (New Zealand) Brett Riley | | Dart 83M / Ford BDD | 30 | Gearbox |
| Ret | | (New Zealand) Eric Morgan | | Ralt RT1 / Ford BDD | 25 | Exhaust |
| Ret | 8 | (Australia) Andrew Miedecke | Graham Watson Racing | Ralt RT4/82 / Ford BDD | 0 | Accident |
| DNS | | (New Zealand) Charlie Thomasen | | Chevron B34 / Ford BDD | | Did Not Start |
| DNS | | (New Zealand) Peter Haskett | James Credit Real Estate | Chevron B49 / Ford BDD | | Did Not Start |

| Preceded by 1983 New Zealand Grand Prix | New Zealand Grand Prix; 1984 | Succeeded by 1985 New Zealand Grand Prix |
