= 1982 New Zealand Grand Prix =

- 28th New Zealand Grand Prix
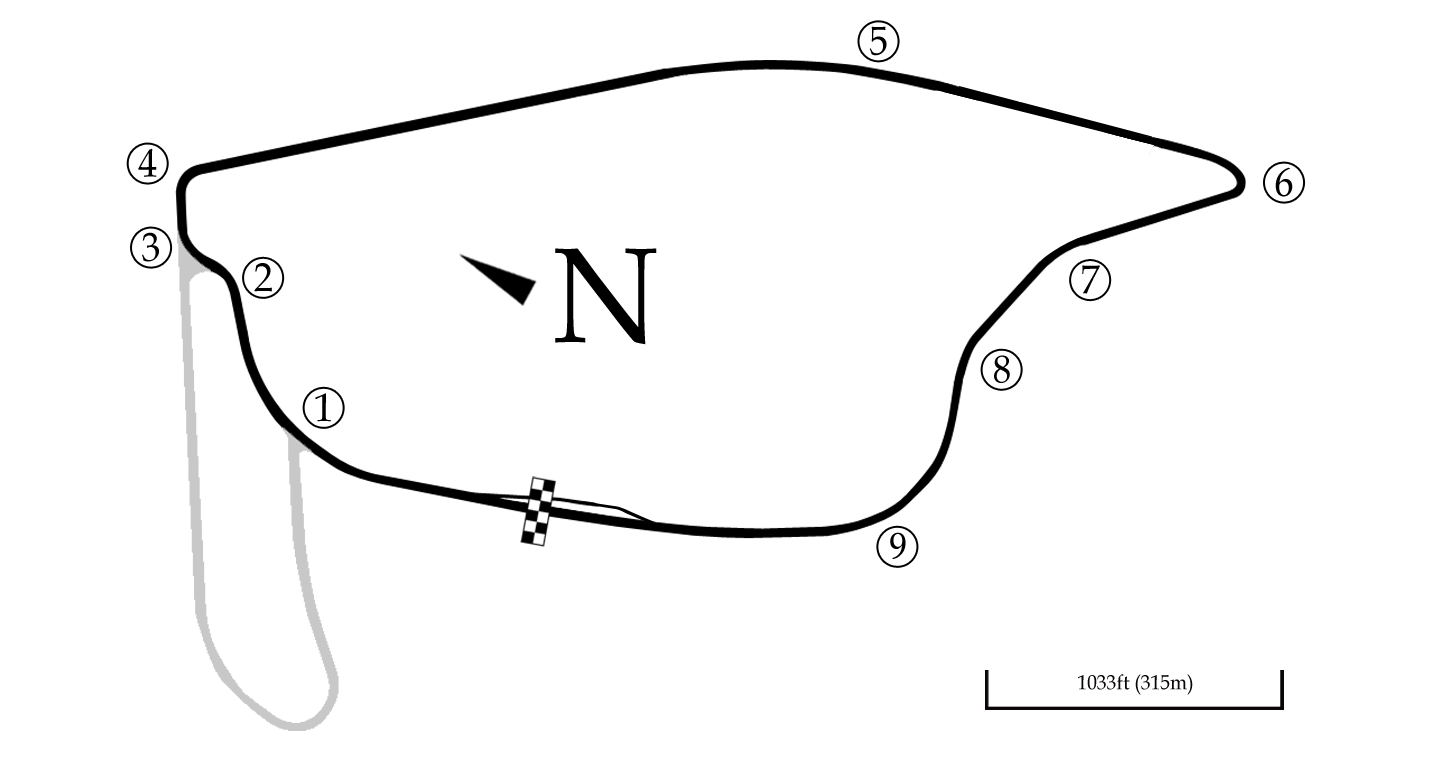

Race details
- Date: 9 January 1982
- Location: Pukekohe Park Raceway, Pukekohe, New Zealand
- Course: Permanent racing facility
- Course length: 2.82 km (1.76 miles)
- Distance: 60 laps, 169.2 km (105.6 miles)

Podium
First	(Brazil) Roberto Moreno	Ralt-Ford
Second	(New Zealand) Steve Millen	Ralt-Ford
Third	(New Zealand) David Oxton	Ralt-Ford

The 1982 New Zealand Grand Prix was a race held at the Pukekohe Park Raceway on 9 January 1982. It was the 28th running of the New Zealand Grand Prix and was run over two heats of 30 laps each, with the final results being an aggregate of the two. The event was won by Brazilian Roberto Moreno. The podium was completed by Kiwis Steve Millen and Dave McMillan.

== Classification ==
=== Heat 1 ===
Pos	No.	Driver	Car	Laps	Time / Retired
1	8	(Brazil) Roberto Moreno	Ralt RT4/82 / Ford BDA Nicholson	30	29min 22.9sec
2	7	(New Zealand) Steve Millen	Ralt RT4/81 / Ford BDA	30	+ 6.9 s
3	1	(New Zealand) Dave McMillan	Ralt RT4/82 / Ford BDA	30	+ 16.2 s
4		(Australia) Charlie O'Brien	Ralt RT4/82 / Ford BDA	30	+ 22.8 s
5	18	(New Zealand) David Oxton	Ralt RT4/80 / Ford BDA	30	+ 25.8 s
6	37	(Australia) John Briggs	March 81A / Ford BDA	30	+ 32.4 s
7	11	(New Zealand) Ken Smith	March 782/79B / Ford BDA	30	+ 42.4 s
8	9	(New Zealand) Graham Watson	Ralt RT4/81 / Ford BDA	29	+ 1 lap
9	3	(United States) Mike Rosen	Ralt RT4/82 / Ford BDA	29	+ 1 lap
10	34	(New Zealand) Bryan Hartley	Chevron B34 / Ford BDA	29	+ 1 lap
11	21	(New Zealand) Steve Cameron	Cuda JR3 / Ford BDA	29	+ 1 lap
12		(New Zealand) Graham Campbell	Chevron B39 / Ford BDA	29	+ 1 lap
13	17	(New Zealand) Robbie Hislop	March 74B / Ford BDA	27	+ 3 laps
14	12	(New Zealand) Tom Donovan	March 77B / Ford BDA	26	+ 4 laps
15	6	(New Zealand) Eric Morgan	Ralt RT1 / Ford BDA	25	+ 5 laps
Ret	4	(Australia) Robert Handford	Ralt RT4/82 / Ford BDA	11	Accident
DNS	41	(New Zealand) Paul Radisich	Ralt RT1 / Nissan LZ14	0	Did Not Start
DNS	22	(New Zealand) Robin Irving	Modus M3 / Ford BDA	0	Did Not Start

=== Heat 2 ===
Pos	No.	Driver	Car	Laps	Time / Retired
1	7	(New Zealand) Steve Millen	Ralt RT4/81 / Ford BDA	30	29min 32.1sec
2	8	(Brazil) Roberto Moreno	Ralt RT4/82 / Ford BDA Nicholson	30	+ 1.8 s
3		(Australia) Charlie O'Brien	Ralt RT4/82 / Ford BDA	30	+ 15.9 s
4	1	(New Zealand) Dave McMillan	Ralt RT4/82 / Ford BDA	30	+ 19.6 s
5	18	(New Zealand) David Oxton	Ralt RT4/80 / Ford BDA	30	+ 32.2 s
6	11	(New Zealand) Ken Smith	March 782/79B / Ford BDA	30	+ 49.3 s
7	3	(United States) Mike Rosen	Ralt RT4/82 / Ford BDA	29	+ 1 lap
8		(New Zealand) Graham Campbell	Chevron B39 / Ford BDA	29	+ 1 lap
9	9	(New Zealand) Graham Watson	Ralt RT4/81 / Ford BDA	29	+ 1 lap
10	34	(New Zealand) Bryan Hartley	Chevron B34 / Ford BDA	29	+ 1 lap
11	12	(New Zealand) Tom Donovan	March 77B / Ford BDA	29	+ 1 lap
12	21	(New Zealand) Steve Cameron	Cuda JR3 / Ford BDA	28	+ 2 laps
13	17	(New Zealand) Robbie Hislop	March 74B / Ford BDA	27	+ 3 laps
NC	6	(New Zealand) Eric Morgan	Ralt RT1 / Ford BDA	18	Not classified
Ret	4	(Australia) Robert Handford	Ralt RT4/82 / Ford BDA	25	Accident
Ret	37	(Australia) John Briggs	March 81A / Ford BDA	10	Loose bodywork
Ret	22	(New Zealand) Robin Irving	Modus M3 / Ford BDA	7	Engine

=== Combined results ===
Pos	No.	Driver	Car	Laps	Time / Retired	Heat 1	Heat 2
1	8	(Brazil) Roberto Moreno	Ralt RT4/82 / Ford BDA Nicholson	60	58min 56.8sec	1st	2nd
2	7	(New Zealand) Steve Millen	Ralt RT4/81 / Ford BDA	60	+ 5.1 s	2nd	1st
3	1	(New Zealand) Dave McMillan	Ralt RT4/82 / Ford BDA	60	+ 34.0 s	3rd	4th
4		(Australia) Charlie O'Brien	Ralt RT4/82 / Ford BDA	60	+ 36.9 s	4th	3rd
5	18	(New Zealand) David Oxton	Ralt RT4/80 / Ford BDA	60	+ 56.2 s	5th	5th
6	11	(New Zealand) Ken Smith	March 782/79B / Ford BDA	60	+ 1:29.9 s	7th	6th
7	9	(New Zealand) Graham Watson	Ralt RT4/81 / Ford BDA	58	+ 2 laps	8th	9th
8	3	(United States) Mike Rosen	Ralt RT4/82 / Ford BDA	58	+ 2 laps	9th	7th
9		(New Zealand) Graham Campbell	Chevron B39 / Ford BDA	58	+ 2 laps	12th	8th
10	34	(New Zealand) Bryan Hartley	Chevron B34 / Ford BDA	58	+ 2 laps	10th	10th
11	21	(New Zealand) Steve Cameron	Cuda JR3 / Ford BDA	57	+ 3 laps	11th	12th
12	12	(New Zealand) Tom Donovan	March 77B / Ford BDA	55	+ 5 laps	14th	11th
13	17	(New Zealand) Robbie Hislop	March 74B / Ford BDA	54	+ 6 laps	13th	13th
14	6	(New Zealand) Eric Morgan	Ralt RT1 / Ford BDA	43	+ 17 laps	15th	NC
15	37	(Australia) John Briggs	March 81A / Ford BDA	40	+ 20 laps	6th	Ret
16	4	(Australia) Robert Handford	Ralt RT4/82 / Ford BDA	36	+ 24 laps	Ret	Ret
17	22	(New Zealand) Robin Irving	Modus M3 / Ford BDA	7	+ 53 laps	DNS	Ret
DNS	41	(New Zealand) Paul Radisich	Ralt RT1 / Nissan LZ14	0	Did Not Start	-	-

Preceded by 1981 New Zealand Grand Prix	New Zealand Grand Prix; 1982	Succeeded by 1983 New Zealand Grand Prix
