= 1985 New Zealand Grand Prix =

1984 New Zealand Grand Prix
- 31st New Zealand Grand Prix
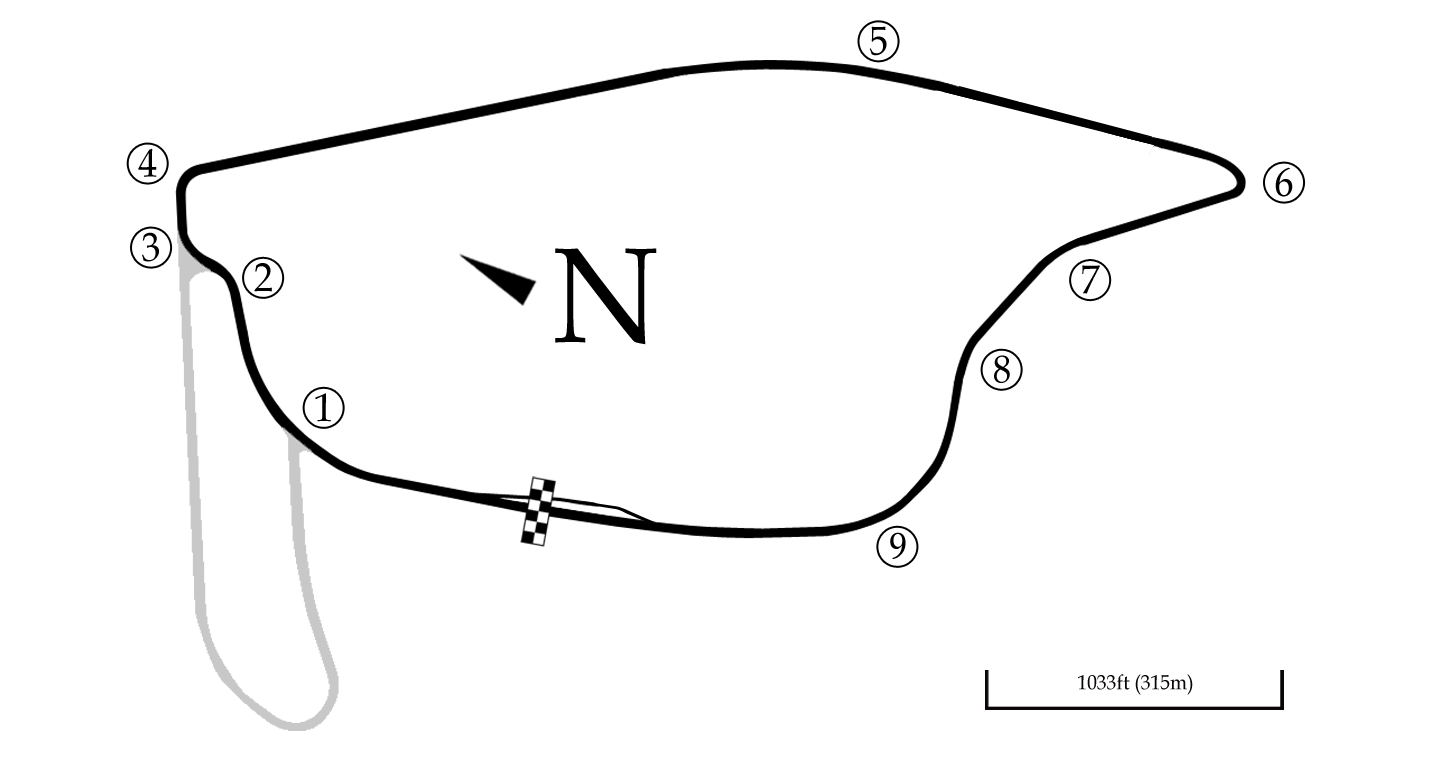

Race details
- Date: 16 December 1984
- Location: Pukekohe Park Raceway, Pukekohe, New Zealand
- Course: Permanent racing facility
- Course length: 2.82 km (1.76 miles)
- Distance: 32 laps, 90.24 km (56.32 miles)

Pole position
Driver	(United States) Davy Jones	Rick Shea Racing
- Time: 0.57.360

Fastest lap
Driver	(United States) Davy Jones	Rick Shea Racing
- Time: 0.57.560

Podium
First	(United States) Ross Cheever	John Brandon Team
Second	(New Zealand) Ken Smith	Apple Car Company
Third	(United States) Jeff MacPherson	Allan McCall Racing

The 1985 New Zealand Grand Prix was a race held at the Pukekohe Park Raceway on 16 December 1984. It was the 31st running of the New Zealand Grand Prix and was run to Formula Pacific regulations. The race was won by American Ross Cheever, who would return to win the next event a month later. The podium was completed by New Zealander Ken Smith and fellow American Jeff MacPherson.

Despite being labelled the 1985 iteration of the event, it was actually held in December 1984. This marked the only time that two New Zealand Grands Prix were held in the same calendar year.

== Classification ==
=== Qualifying ===
Pos	No.	Driver	Entrant	Car	Time	Grid
1	1	(United States) Davy Jones	Rick Shea Racing	Ralt RT4/85 / Ford BDD	0.57.36	1
2	41	(New Zealand) Dave McMillan	More Magazine	Ralt RT4/82 / Ford BDD	0.57.36	2
3	2	(United States) Ross Cheever	John Brandon Team	Ralt RT4/85 / Ford BDD	0.58.01	3
4	70	(United States) Jeff MacPherson	Allan McCall Racing	Ralt RT4/83 / Ford BDD	0.58.20	4
5	11	(New Zealand) Ken Smith	Apple Car Company	Ralt RT4/82 / Ford BDD	0.58.29	5
6	6	(New Zealand) Brett Riley	Eric Morgan Racing	Ralt RT4/82 / Ford BDD	0.58.32	6
7	3	(Australia) Charlie O'Brien	Charlie O'Brien Racing	Ralt RT4/83 / Ford BDD	0.58.47	7
8	4	(New Zealand) Ross Cameron	Rick Shea Racing	Ralt RT4/81 / Ford BDD	0.58.60	8
9	5	(United States) Tom Blackaller	Rick Shea Racing	Ralt RT4/83 / Ford BDD	0.59.40	9
10	19	(United States) Riley Hopkins	Riley Hopkins Racing	Ralt RT4/82 / Ford BDD	0.59.76	10
11	54	(New Zealand) Peter Haskett	JCL Group	Chevron B49 / Ford BDD	1.00.23	11
12	7	(Australia) Ross Zampatti	Ross Zampatti Racing	Ralt RT4/82 / Ford BDD	1.01.23	12

=== Race ===
Pos	No.	Driver	Entrant	Laps	Time/Retired	Grid
1	2	(United States) Ross Cheever	John Brandon Team	32	37min 20.22sec	3
2	11	(New Zealand) Ken Smith	Apple Car Company	32	+ 24.83 s	5
3	70	(United States) Jeff MacPherson	Allan McCall Racing	32	+ 39.49 s	4
4	19	(United States) Riley Hopkins	Riley Hopkins Racing	32	+ 1:31.31 s	10
5	5	(United States) Tom Blackaller	Rick Shea Racing	31	+ 1 lap	9
6	54	(New Zealand) Peter Haskett	JCL Group	29	+ 3 laps	11
7	41	(New Zealand) Dave McMillan	More Magazine	22	+ 10 laps	2
Ret	7	(Australia) Ross Zampatti	Ross Zampatti Racing	17	Accident	12
Ret	3	(Australia) Charlie O'Brien	Charlie O'Brien Racing	10	Throttle	7
Ret	1	(United States) Davy Jones	Rick Shea Racing	6	Accident	1
DNS	4	(New Zealand) Ross Cameron	Rick Shea Racing		Did Not Start	
DNS	6	(New Zealand) Brett Riley	Eric Morgan Racing		Did Not Start	
DNP	12	(New Zealand) Heather Spurle	Heather Spurle Racing		Did Not Participate	

Preceded by 1984 New Zealand Grand Prix	New Zealand Grand Prix; 1985	Succeeded by 1986 New Zealand Grand Prix
