= 1981 New Zealand Grand Prix =

- 27th New Zealand Grand Prix
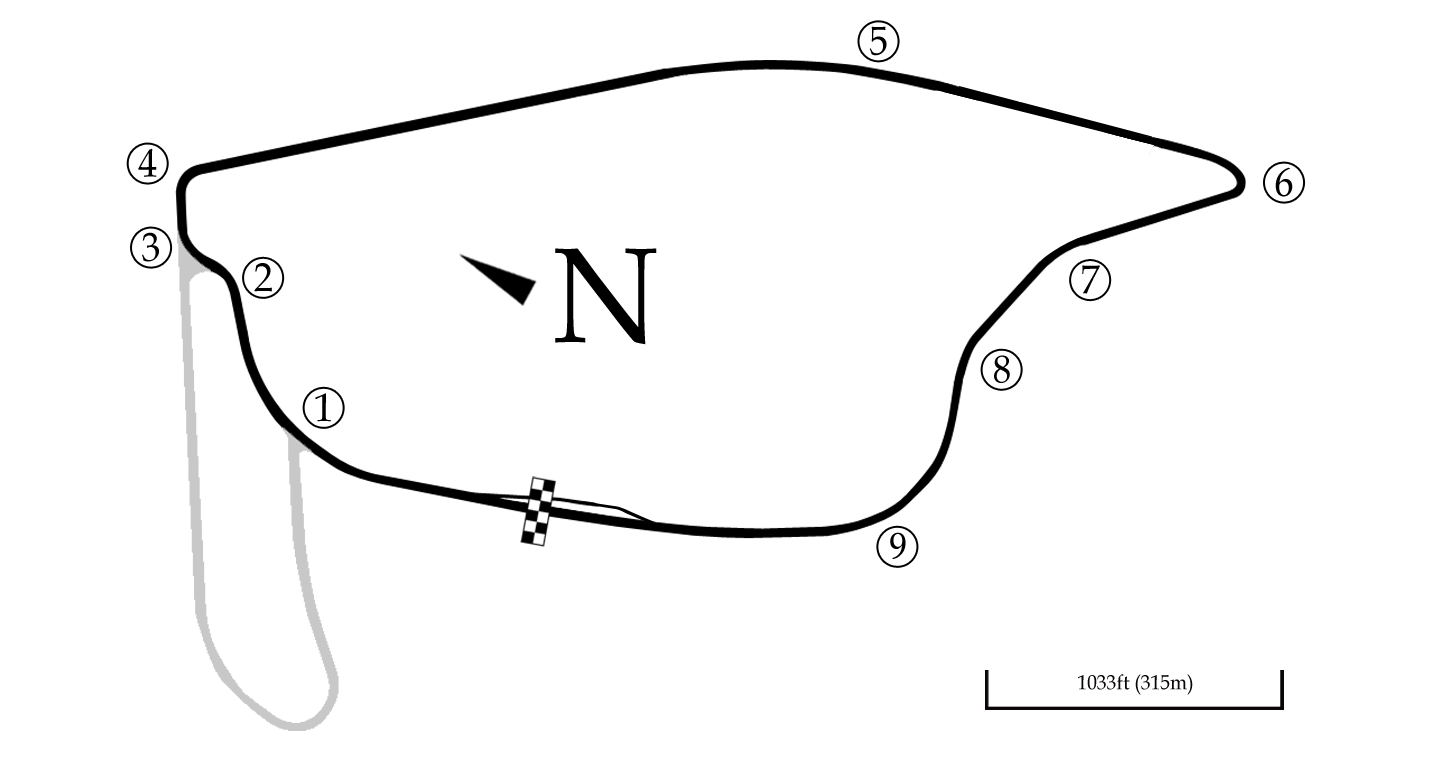

Race details
- Date: 10 January 1981
- Location: Pukekohe Park Raceway, Pukekohe, New Zealand
- Course: Permanent racing facility
- Course length: 2.82 km (1.76 miles)
- Distance: 60 laps, 169.2 km (105.6 miles)

Pole position
Driver	(New Zealand) Steve Millen	Ralt-Ford
- Time: 0.57.9

Podium
First	(New Zealand) Dave McMillan	Ralt-Ford
Second	(New Zealand) David Oxton	Ralt-Ford
Third	(New Zealand) Steve Millen	Ralt-Ford

The 1981 New Zealand Grand Prix was a race held at the Pukekohe Park Raceway on 10 January 1981. It was the 27th running of the New Zealand Grand Prix and was run over two heats of 30 laps each, with the final results being an aggregate of the two. The event was won by New Zealander Dave McMillan. The podium was completed by fellow Kiwis David Oxton and Steve Millen.

== Classification ==
=== Qualifying ===
Pos	No.	Driver	Car	Time	Gap
1	7	(New Zealand) Steve Millen	Ralt RT1 / Ford BDA	0:57.9	
2	18	(New Zealand) David Oxton	Ralt RT4/80 / Ford BDA	0:58.4	+ 0.5 s
3	1	(New Zealand) Dave McMillan	Ralt RT4/81 / Nissan LZ14	0:59.0	+ 1.1 s
4	4	(Australia) John Smith	March 77B / Ford BDA Nicholson	0:59.0	+ 1.1 s
5	11	(New Zealand) Ken Smith	March 782/79B / Ford BDA	0:59.1	+ 1.2 s
6	31	(New Zealand) Rob Wilson	March 80A / Ford BDA	0:59.3	+ 1.4 s
7	3	(Australia) Charlie O'Brien	Ralt RT1 / Ford BDA	0:59.3	+ 1.4 s
8	19	(New Zealand) Grant Campbell	Chevron B39 / Ford BDA	0:59.7	+ 1.8 s
9	5	(United Kingdom) Adrian Reynard	Cuda JR5 / Ford BDA	1:00.0	+ 2.1 s
10	6	(New Zealand) Eric Morgan	Chevron B29 / Ford BDA	1:00.3	+ 2.4 s
11	12	(New Zealand) Tom Donovan	March 77B / Ford BDA	1:01.0	+ 3.1 s
12		(New Zealand) Dave Saunders	March 77B / Ford BDA	1:01.5	+ 3.6 s
13		(New Zealand) Rex Hart	Surtees TS15 / Ford BDA	1:02.0	+ 4.1 s
14		(New Zealand) Robin Irving	Modus M3 / Ford BDA Masport	1:05.3	+ 7.4 s

=== Grand Prix ===
Pos	No.	Driver	Car	Heat 1	Heat 2	Laps	Pts
1	1	(New Zealand) Dave McMillan	Ralt RT1 / Ford BDA	1st	3rd	60	13
2	18	(New Zealand) David Oxton	Ralt RT4/80 / Ford BDA	2nd	2nd	60	12
3	7	(New Zealand) Steve Millen	Ralt RT1 / Ford BDA	Ret	1st	60	9
4	4	(Australia) John Smith	March 77B / Ford BDA Nicholson	3rd	4th	60	7
5	3	(Australia) Charlie O'Brien	Ralt RT1 / Ford BDA	4th	5th	60	5
6	5	(United Kingdom) Adrian Reynard	Cuda JR5 / Ford BDA	5th	7th	59	2
7	19	(New Zealand) Grant Campbell	Chevron B39 / Ford BDA	6th	9th	59	1
8	31	(New Zealand) Rob Wilson	March 80A / Ford BDA	9th	6th	60	1
9	6	(New Zealand) Eric Morgan	Chevron B29 / Ford BDA	7th	8th	59	
Ret	11	(New Zealand) Ken Smith	March 782/79B / Ford BDA	10th	Ret	37	
Ret	12	(New Zealand) Tom Donovan	March 77B / Ford BDA	Ret	Ret	35	
Ret		(New Zealand) Robin Irving	Modus M3 / Ford BDA	8th	Ret	32	
Ret		(New Zealand) Rex Hart	Surtees TS15 / Ford BDA	Ret	DNS	0	
Ret		(New Zealand) Dave Saunders	March 77B / Ford BDA	Ret	DNS	0	
DNS	1	(New Zealand) Dave McMillan	Ralt RT4/81 / Nissan LZ14	Withdrew		0	

Preceded by 1980 New Zealand Grand Prix	New Zealand Grand Prix; 1981	Succeeded by 1982 New Zealand Grand Prix
