= Ross Cheever =

American racing driver

- Nationality: (United States) American
- Born: Alfred Ross Cheever; April 12, 1964 (age 62) Rome, Italy
- Relatives: Eddie Cheever (brother); Eddie Cheever III (nephew)

Championship titles
- 1987: Japanese Formula 3 Championship

Alfred Ross Cheever (born April 12, 1964 in Rome, Italy) is a retired American race car driver and is the younger brother of former Formula One driver and Indianapolis 500 champion Eddie Cheever.

Born in Rome, Cheever spent most of his career in Japan, where he won the Japanese Formula Three championship in 1987 and raced successfully in the Japanese Formula 3000 Championship for eight years.

== Career ==
Cheever started his career in British Formula 3, with five wins between 1984 and 1985. He later competed in Formula Atlantic in New Zealand during the winter of 1985 and 1986 winning the New Zealand Grand Prix both years at the wheel of a Ralt RT4. After failing to qualify in his International Formula 3000 debut at Brands Hatch, and a brief foray in the United States' racing scene that included three starts in the new American Racing Series (current Indy NXT), Cheever switched his attention to Japan in 1987.

In his first season, Cheever won the Japanese Formula Three championship and signed a deal with Dome, racing at the All-Japan Sports Prototype Championship with Toyota and a half-season program in the Japanese Formula 3000 Championship, which became a full time seat for 1988. He narrowly lost the 1989 title to Hitoshi Ogawa by three points, and again in 1991 at the last race to Ukyo Katayama, finishing second both times. He also reached the final race of the 1992 and 1993 season with title chances, finally retiring at the end of the 1994 season after finishing third in the standings for the third straight year. By then, Cheever had become a Suzuka specialist, with seven of his ten wins in Japanese F3000 coming at this track since 1991.

After his first prototype experience in 1987, Cheever returned to a Toyota seat with Dome in 1989, which included a 24 Hour of Le Mans run that ended in an early retirement due to an engine failure. In the summer of 1992, Cheever dovetailed his F3000 season with his IndyCar debut for A. J. Foyt Enterprises in 1992, racing against his brother Eddie. He finished 11th in his debut at Portland, but suffered mechanical failures at Milwaukee and Cleveland, crashed at Road America early in the race and withdrew from the Vancouver event due to a crash in practice.

Cheever returned to the cockpit in 2000 as a test driver for Eddie's Cheever Racing, to help in their transition to Infiniti engines in the Indy Racing League. He was entered in a second Cheever Racing car for the Indianapolis 500 and completed rookie orientation. However, Cheever was withdrawn by the team before Pole Day, as Eddie claimed that his crash during Opening Day had left the team without "the necessary resources to field a first-class effort for the car". Ross had only taken part in a single practice day, four days before being pulled out, and brushed the wall in an incident between Turns 1 and 2.

== Racing record ==
=== Complete New Zealand Grand Prix results ===
Year	Team	Car	Qualifying	Main race
1985	John Brandon Team	Ralt RT4/85 / Ford BDD	3rd	1st
1986	Ralt Australia	Ralt RT4/85 / Ford BDD	?	1st

=== Complete Macau Grand Prix results ===
Year	Team	Car	Qualifying	Main race
1984	(United Kingdom) Valour Racing	Ralt RT3 - Volkswagen	14th	DNF
1985	(United Kingdom) Valour Racing	Ralt RT30 - Volkswagen	?	DNF
1987	(Japan) Funaki Racing	Ralt RT30 - Toyota	?	13th

=== Complete International Formula 3000 results ===
(key)

Year	Entrant	1	2	3	4	5	6	7	8	9	10	11	DC	Points
1986	Eddie Jordan Racing	SIL	VAL	PAU	SPA	IMO	MUG	PER	ÖST	BIR; DNQ	BUG	JAR	NC	0

=== Complete Japanese Formula 3 results ===
(key)

Year	Team	Engine	1	2	3	4	5	6	7	8	9	10	DC	Pts
1987	Funaki Racing	Toyota	SUZ; 4	TSU; 1	FUJ; 2	SUZ; 1	SUG; 1	SEN; 15	MIN; 2	TSU; 4	SUZ; 3	SUZ; 1	1st	122

=== Complete Japanese Formula 3000 results ===
(key)

Year	Entrant	1	2	3	4	5	6	7	8	9	10	11	12	DC	Points
1987	Dome	SUZ	FUJ; 9	MIN; Ret	SUZ	SUZ	SUG; Ret	FUJ	SUZ; 13	SUZ				17th	2
1988	Dome	SUZ; 6	FUJ; 8	MIN; 12	SUZ; Ret	SUG; 14	FUJ; 6	SUZ; 5	SUZ; Ret					9th	4
1989	Dome	SUZ; 11	FUJ; 1	MIN; 1	SUZ; 2	SUG; Ret	FUJ; 10	SUZ; 2	SUZ; 12					2nd	30
1990	Dome	SUZ; 2	FUJ; DNS	MIN; Ret	SUZ; Ret	SUG; 6	FUJ; Ret	FUJ; 6	SUZ; Ret	FUJ; 10	SUZ; Ret			8th	8
1991	Team LeMans	SUZ; Ret	AUT; Ret	FUJ; 12	MIN; Ret	SUZ; 11	SUG; 1	FUJ; Ret	FUJ; C	SUZ; 1	FUJ; C	SUZ; 1	FUJ; Ret	2nd	27
1992	Team LeMans	SUZ; 1	FUJ; Ret	MIN; Ret	SUZ; 2	AUT; 13	SUG; 3	FUJ; 17	FUJ; 2	SUZ; DNS	FUJ; 6	SUZ; 4		3rd	29
1993	Promise & Reynard	SUZ; 1	FUJ; Ret	MIN; 4	SUZ; 9	AUT; C	SUG; 3	FUJ; C	FUJ; 12	SUZ; 1	FUJ; 7	SUZ; 2		3rd	31
1994	Team LeMans	SUZ; 1	FUJ; 3	MIN; 5	SUZ; 2	SUG; 4	FUJ; 7	SUZ; 1	FUJ; Ret	FUJ; Ret	SUZ; 7			3rd	33

=== Complete 24 Hours of Le Mans results ===
Year	Class	No	Tyres	Car	Team	Co-Drivers	Laps	Pos.	Class Pos.
1989	C1	36	B	Toyota 89C-V; Toyota R32V 3.2L Turbo V8	(Japan) Toyota Team Tom's	(Japan) Hitoshi Ogawa (Italy) Paolo Barilla	45	DNF	DNF

=== American open–wheel racing results ===
(key)

=== Indy Lights ===
Year	Team	Series	1	2	3	4	5	6	7	8	9	10	Rank	Points
1986	Brian Stewart Racing	ARS	PHX1	MIL	MEA	TOR	POC	MDO; 3	ROA; 4	LS; 15	PHX2	MIA	14th	33

==== CART ====
Year	Team	1	2	3	4	5	6	7	8	9	10	11	12	13	14	15	16	Rank	Points	Ref
1992	A. J. Foyt Enterprises	SRF	PHX	LBH	INDY	DET	POR; 11	MIL; 20	NHA	TOR	MIS	CLE; 25	ROA; 25	VAN; Wth	MDO	NAZ	LS	32nd	2	

==== Indy Racing League ====
Year	Team	1	2	3	4	5	6	7	8	9	Rank	Points	Ref
2000	Team Cheever	WDW	PHX	LVS	INDY; Wth	TXS	PPIR	ATL	KTY	TX2	NC	–	

Sporting positions
Preceded by Davy Jones	Winner of the New Zealand Grand Prix; 1985 and 1986	Succeeded by Davy Jones
Preceded by Akio Morimoto	All-Japan Formula Three; Champion; 1987	Succeeded by Akihiko Nakaya
