= 1991 Japanese Formula 3000 Championship =

Seasons
- ← 1990 1992 →

The 1991 Japanese Formula 3000 Championship was scheduled over 11 rounds and contested over 10 rounds. 27 different teams, 47 different drivers, five different chassis and three different engines competed.

Heroes Racing driver Ukyo Katayama won the championship and would step up to Formula One the following year. The 1991 season was also noteworthy for a one-off appearance by Michael Schumacher at the sixth round of the championship at Sportsland Sugo. Schumacher would finish second in his only appearance before making his Formula One debut four weeks later in Spa-Francorchamps, and would go on to win seven Formula One World Drivers' Championships.

36 cars attempted to qualify for the third round of the championship at Fuji, the most entries for a single Japanese top formula event.

== Calendar ==
All events took place at venues located within the country of Japan.

Race No	Track	Race name	Date	Laps	Distance	Time	Speed	Winner	Pole position	Fastest race lap
1	Suzuka	Million Card Cup Race 2&4 Suzuka	3 March 1991	35	5.864=205.241 km	1'03:33.365	193.757 km/h	Ukyo Katayama	Ukyo Katayama	Ukyo Katayama
2	Autopolis	All Japan F3000 Championship in Autopolis	24 March 1991	43	4.674=200.982 km	1'08:17.963	176.560 km/h	Akihiko Nakaya	Akihiko Nakaya	Kazuyoshi Hoshino
3	Fuji	Cabin International Formula Cup	14 April 1991	45	4.470=201.15 km	1'00:09.320	200.631 km/h	Kazuyoshi Hoshino	Mauro Martini	Keiji Matsumoto
4	Mine	Nippon Shinpan Super Cup Rd.1 Nishi-Nihon All Star	12 May 1991	62	3.239=200.818 km	1'36:48.120	124.471 km/h	Eddie Irvine	Akihiko Nakaya	Takuya Kurosawa
5	Suzuka	Million Card Cup Race Round 2 Suzuka	26 May 1991	34	5.864=199.376 km	1'03:38.746	187.955 km/h	Ukyo Katayama	Ukyo Katayama	Ross Cheever
6	Sugo	Nippon Shinpan Super Cup Rd.2 Sugo Inter Formula	28 July 1991	54	3.704=200.016 km	1'06:46.689	179.714 km/h	Ross Cheever	Ross Cheever	Akihiko Nakaya
7	Fuji	Nippon Shinpan Super Cup Rd.3 Fuji Champions	11 August 1991	45	4.470=201.15 km	0'59:58.828	201.216 km/h	Kazuyoshi Hoshino	Mauro Martini	Ukyo Katayama
	Fuji	Nippon Shinpan Super Cup Rd.4 Fuji Inter	8 September 1991	race postponed to November, 30 due to heavy rain
8	Suzuka	Million Card Cup Race Round 3 Suzuka	29 September 1991	35	5.864=205.241 km	1'05:07.814	189.074 km/h	Ross Cheever	Ukyo Katayama	Volker Weidler
	Fuji	Nippon Shinpan Super Cup Rd.5 Fuji Final	27 October 1991	cancelled due to heavy rain
9	Suzuka	Million Card Cup Race Final Round Suzuka	17 November 1991	35	5.864=205.241 km	1'04:23.785	191.229 km/h	Ross Cheever	Kazuyoshi Hoshino	Volker Weidler
10	Fuji	Nippon Shinpan Super Cup Rd.4 Fuji Inter	30 November 1991	45	4.470=201.15 km	0'59:33.076	202.666 km/h	Volker Weidler	Kazuyoshi Hoshino	Toshio Suzuki

Note:

Race 10 was started with the qualification times set for the race scheduled on September, 8.

The weekend in Fuji with the race cancelled on October, 27 saw only practice and qualification sections.

== Final point standings ==
=== Driver ===
For every race, points were awarded: 9 points to the winner, 6 to the runner up, 4 to third place, 3 to fourth place, 2 to fifth place, and 1 to sixth place. No additional points were awarded. The best 7 results count. No driver had a point deduction.

Place	Name	Country	Team	Chassis	Engine	(Japan)	(Japan)	(Japan)	(Japan)	(Japan)	(Japan)	(Japan)	(Japan)	(Japan)	(Japan)	Total points
1	Ukyo Katayama	Japan	Cabin Racing/Heroes	Lola	Cosworth	9	3	-	-	9	1	6	6	-	6	40
2	Ross Cheever	United States	Team LeMans	Reynard	Mugen Honda	-	-	-	-	-	9	-	9	9	-	27
3	Volker Weidler	Germany	Team Nova	Lola	Mugen Honda	-	-	-	4	4	-	4	-	4	9	25
4	Kazuyoshi Hoshino	Japan	Team Impul	Lola	Mugen Honda	-	6	9	-	-	-	9	-	-	-	24
5	Hitoshi Ogawa	Japan	Stellar International	Lola	Mugen Honda	6	1	4	-	6	-	-	2	1	-	20
6	Akihiko Nakaya	Japan	Le Garage Cox Racing/Mooncraft	Lola	Mugen Honda	-	9	-	-	-	4	-	3	-	-	16
7	Eddie Irvine	United Kingdom	Team Cerumo	Lola	Mugen Honda	-	2	-	9	3	-	-	-	-	-	14
8	Mauro Martini	Italy	Suntec Racing	Lola	Mugen Honda	1	4	-	-	-	-	2	-	6	-	13
9	Thomas Danielsson	Sweden	Team Nova	Lola	Mugen Honda	-	-	-	-	-	3	3	4	2	-	12
10	Johnny Herbert	United Kingdom	Team LeMans	Ralt	Mugen Honda	2	-	-	6	-	-	-	-	-	1	9
11	Jan Lammers	Netherlands	Dome	Dome	Mugen Honda	4	-	2	-	-	-	1	-	-	-	7
12	Keiji Matsumoto	Japan	Dome	Dome	Mugen Honda	-	-	6	-	-	-	-	-	-	-	6
	Michael Schumacher	Germany	Team LeMans	Ralt	Mugen Honda	-	-	-	-	-	6	-	-	-	-	6
	Jeff Krosnoff	United States	Suntec Racing	Lola	Mugen Honda	-	-	3	-	-	-	-	-	3	-	6
15	Toshio Suzuki	Japan	Universal Racing	Lola	Mugen Honda	-	-	-	2	2	-	-	-	-	-	4
	Paulo Carcasci	Brazil	Bitoku Motorsport	Lola	Mugen Honda	-	-	-	-	-	-	-	-	-	4	4
17	Masanori Sekiya	Japan	Leyton House Racing	Lola	Mugen Honda	3	-	-	-	-	-	-	-	-	-	3
	Minoru Tanaka	Japan	Leyton House Racing	Lola	Mugen Honda	-	-	-	3	-	-	-	-	-	-	3
	Naoki Hattori	Japan	Le Garage Cox Racing/Mooncraft	Lola	Mugen Honda	-	-	-	-	-	2	-	1	-	-	3
	Maurizio Sandro Sala	Brazil	Super Evolution Racing	Lola	Mugen Honda	-	-	-	-	-	-	-	-	-	3	3
21	Masahiro Hasemi	Japan	Speed Star Wheel Racing	Lola	Mugen Honda	-	-	-	-	-	-	-	-	-	2	2
22	Takuya Kurosawa	Japan	Nakajima Racing	Ralt	Mugen Honda	-	-	1	-	-	-	-	-	-	-	1
	Mika Salo	Finland	Ad Racing Team Co. Ltd.	Lola	Mugen Honda	-	-	-	1	-	-	-	-	-	-	1
	Geoff Lees	United Kingdom	Team Hayashi	Ralt	Mugen Honda	-	-	-	-	1	-	-	-	-	-	1

== Complete Overview ==
first column of every race	10	= grid position

second column of every race	10	= race result

R=retired NS=did not start NQ=did not qualify DIS=disqualified

Place	Name	Country	Team	Chassis	Engine	(Japan)		(Japan)		(Japan)		(Japan)		(Japan)		(Japan)		(Japan)		(Japan)		(Japan)		(Japan)
1	Ukyo Katayama	Japan	Cabin Racing/Heroes	Lola	Cosworth	1	1	4	4	3	9	3	R	1	1	3	6	3	2	1	2	4	10	2	2
2	Ross Cheever	United States	Team LeMans	Reynard	Mugen Honda	16	R	8	R	5	12	2	R	10	11	1	1	4	R	2	1	3	1	4	R
3	Volker Weidler	Germany	Team Nova	Lola	Mugen Honda	20	15	34	NQ	20	19	18	3	5	3	13	8	8	3	10	10	8	3	6	1
4	Kazuyoshi Hoshino	Japan	Team Impul	Lola	Mugen Honda	7	R	3	2	2	1	8	R	4	R	11	R	2	1	6	R	1	R	1	R
5	Hitoshi Ogawa	Japan	Stellar International	Lola	Mugen Honda	2	2	11	6	13	3	6	R	2	2	12	17	13	12	4	5	10	6	9	R
6	Akihiko Nakaya	Japan	Le Garage Cox Racing/Mooncraft	Lola	Mugen Honda	12	16	1	1	7	R	1	R	8	7	7	3	6	8	3	4	2	R	7	15
7	Eddie Irvine	United Kingdom	Team Cerumo	Lola	Mugen Honda	10	8	2	5	11	15	11	1	22	4	9	7	16	13	8	R	20	13	13	9
8	Mauro Martini	Italy	Suntec Racing	Lola	Mugen Honda	3	6	5	3	1	16	5	R	3	R	20	10	1	5	17	14	5	2	3	13
9	Thomas Danielsson	Sweden	Team Nova	Lola	Mugen Honda	6	R	22	19	19	R	15	9	13	DIS	6	4	7	4	7	3	11	5	17	R
10	Johnny Herbert	United Kingdom	Team LeMans	Ralt	Mugen Honda	5	5	9	7	8	R	13	2	7	R	21	R	20	R	9	7	12	R	22	6
11	Jan Lammers	Netherlands	Dome	Dome	Mugen Honda	8	3	16	9	17	5	10	R	15	10	25	R	17	6	15	R	14	7	27	R
12	Keiji Matsumoto	Japan	Dome	Dome	Mugen Honda	18	R	15	R	9	2	7	R	6	R	18	R	18	24	16	12	25	18	16	R
	Michael Schumacher	Germany	Team LeMans	Ralt	Mugen Honda	-	-	-	-	-	-	-	-	-	-	4	2	-	-	-	-	-	-	-	-
	Jeff Krosnoff	United States	Suntec Racing	Lola	Mugen Honda	13	7	6	10	10	4	14	NS	11	R	14	14	11	17	12	9	7	4	12	R
15	Toshio Suzuki	Japan	Universal Racing	Lola	Mugen Honda	22	11	13	NS	6	8	26	5	21	5	16	9	29	NQ	28	11	26	12	15	11
	Paulo Carcasci	Brazil	Bitoku Motorsport	Lola	Mugen Honda	-	-	DIS	-	14	18	19	R	12	12	17	13	12	7	11	R	6	8	10	3
17	Masanori Sekiya	Japan	Leyton House Racing	Lola	Mugen Honda	4	4	18	15	24	17	9	10	17	R			10	9	-	-			5	NS
17	Masanori Sekiya	Japan	Leyton House Racing	Leyton House	Mugen Honda											5	11
17	Masanori Sekiya	Japan	Team LeMans	Ralt	Mugen Honda																	16	9
	Minoru Tanaka	Japan	Leyton House Racing	Lola	Mugen Honda	21	R	23	R	32	NQ	16	4	28	R	15	12	22	15	-	-
	Minoru Tanaka	Japan	Dome	Dome	Mugen Honda																	28	15
	Minoru Tanaka	Japan	Leyton House Racing	Leyton House	Mugen Honda																			33	NQ
	Naoki Hattori	Japan	Le Garage Cox Racing/Mooncraft	Lola	Mugen Honda	14	R	7	13	16	10	12	15	16	R	2	5	15	10	5	6	9	R	14	12
	Maurizio Sandro Sala	Brazil	Super Evolution Racing	Lola	Mugen Honda	-	-	-	-	-	-	-	-	34	NQ	24	R	28	14	27	16	22	R	18	4
21	Masahiro Hasemi	Japan	Speed Star Wheel Racing	Lola	Mugen Honda	23	9	29	NQ	23	14	29	NQ	20	R	26	R	14	19	19	15	27	14	11	5
22	Takuya Kurosawa	Japan	Nakajima Racing	Ralt	Mugen Honda	15	R	10	8	4	6	4	7	9	R	8	15	5	11	-	-			8	R
22	Takuya Kurosawa	Japan	Nakajima Racing	Reynard	Mugen Honda																	18	17
	Mika Salo	Finland	Ad Racing Team Co. Ltd.	Lola	Mugen Honda	-	-	26	14	33	NQ	22	6	31	NQ	28	NQ		18	32	NQ
	Mika Salo	Finland	Ad Racing Team Co. Ltd.	Reynard	Mugen Honda													25				15	R	19	R
	Geoff Lees	United Kingdom	Team Hayashi	Ralt	Mugen Honda	24	14	14	18	27	13	17	11	14	6
	Geoff Lees	United Kingdom	Team Hayashi	Lola	Mugen Honda											10	R
	Geoff Lees	United Kingdom	Team Hayashi	Lola	Judd													31	NQ	13	8	29	NQ	26	R
-	Naohiro Furuya	Japan	Dome	Lola	Mugen Honda	26	R	20	12	21	24	30	NQ	23	R	27	NQ	26	25	24	R	23	R	29	7
-	Takao Wada	Japan	Advan Sport Pal	Lola	Mugen Honda	27	17	19	NS	12	7	28	R	32	NQ	-	-	32	NQ	-	-	-	-	-	-
-	Tetsuya Ota	Japan	CSK Racing	Lola	Mugen Honda	32	NQ	31	NQ	31	NQ	27	12	25	9	32	NQ	21	23	26	19	-	-	24	8
-	Osamu Nakako	Japan	Nakajima Racing	Lola	Mugen Honda	28	10	12	11	22	R	21	8	19	R	22	R	24	20	30	NQ	-	-	32	NQ
-	Hisashi Wada	Japan	Funaki Racing	Lola	Mugen Honda	25	NS	32	NQ	30	NQ	31	NQ	26	8	34	NQ	30	NQ	29	NQ	-	-	23	NS
-	Yoshiyasu Tachi	Japan	Navi Connection/Funaki Racing	Lola	Mugen Honda	11	R	27	21	29	NQ	32	NQ	24	R	29	NQ	9	R	20	R	13	16	20	10
-	Masahiko Kageyama	Japan	Stellar International	Lola	Mugen Honda	19	R	21	17	15	11	25	R	18	13	19	R	19	16	14	13	24	R	31	NQ
-	Kunimitsu Takahashi	Japan	Advan Sport Nova	Lola	Mugen Honda	29	NQ	25	20	25	22	24	14	30	NQ	23	16	23	21	21	20	19	11	21	R
-	Hideshi Matsuda	Japan	Takeshi Project Racing	Lola	Cosworth	17	12	17	R	28	20	DIS	-	36	NQ	-	-	-	-	-	-	-	-	-	-
-	Hideo Fukuyama	Japan	Team Noji International	Lola	Mugen Honda	9	13	30	NQ	26	23	20	13	29	NQ	30	NQ	34	NQ	18	17	17	R	25	R
-	Katsunori Iketani	Japan	Super Cad Racing/Noji	Lola	Mugen Honda	DIS	-	-	-	35	NQ	DIS	-	33	NQ	-	-	33	NQ	22	R	21	R	28	14
-	Enrico Bertaggia	Italy	Footwork Racing International	Lola	Mugen Honda	34	NQ	24	16	18	21	23	16	-	-	-	-	-	-	-	-	-	-	-	-
-	Katsutomo Kaneishi	Japan	Zoom Racing	Lola	Cosworth	DIS	-	28	22	34	NQ	DIS	-	27	R	31	NQ	27	22	23	18	-	-	30	NQ
-	Koji Sato	Japan	Nakajima Racing	Reynard	Mugen Honda	-	-	-	-	-	-	-	-	-	-	-	-	-	-	25	R	-	-	-	-
-	Masyoshi Nishigaito	Japan	Advan Sport Pal	Lola	Mugen Honda	-	-	-	-	-	-	-	-	-	-	-	-	-	-	31	NQ	30	NQ	-	-
-	Philippe Adams	Belgium	CSK Racing	Lola	Mugen Honda	-	-	-	-	-	-	-	-	-	-	-	-	-	-	-	-	32	NQ	-	-
-	Kouichi Iwaki	Japan	Team Iwaki	Lola	Mugen Honda	31	NQ	-	-	DIS	-	-	-	-	-	-	-	-	-	-	-	-	-	-	-
-	Shunji Kasuya	Japan	Super Evolution Racing	Lola	Mugen Honda	36	NQ	-	-	36	NQ	-	-	-	-	-	-	-	-	-	-	-	-	-	-
-	Hideki Okada	Japan	Ad Racing Team Co. Ltd.	Lola	Mugen Honda	30	NQ	-	-	-	-	-	-	-	-	-	-	-	-	-	-	-	-	-	-
-	Shuji Hyoudou	Japan	Bitoku Motorsport	Lola	Mugen Honda	33	NQ	-	-	-	-	-	-	-	-	-	-	-	-	-	-	-	-	-	-
-	Kenny Acheson	United Kingdom	Ad Racing Team Co. Ltd.	Reynard	Mugen Honda	DIS	-	-	-	-	-	-	-	-	-	-	-	-	-	-	-	-	-	-	-
-	Pedro Chaves	Portugal	Nakajima Racing	Lola	Mugen Honda	-	-	-	-	-	-	-	-	-	-	-	-	-	-	-	-	DIS	-	-	-
-	Emanuele Pirro	Italy	Team Hayashi	Lola	Judd	-	-	-	-	-	-	-	-	-	-	-	-	-	-	-	-	-	-	-	-
