= 1983 New Zealand Grand Prix =

- 29th New Zealand Grand Prix
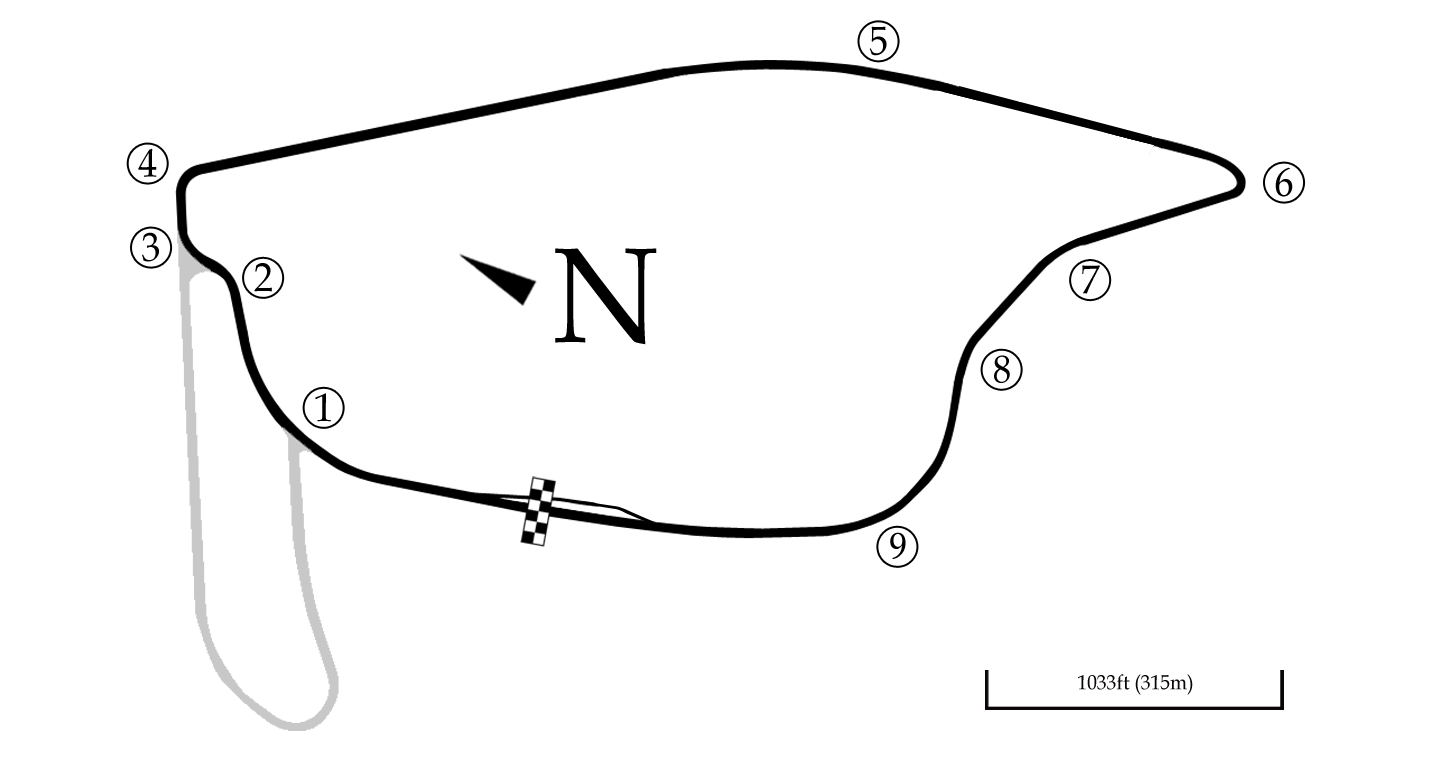

Race details
- Date: 8 January 1983
- Location: Pukekohe Park Raceway, Pukekohe, New Zealand
- Course: Permanent racing facility
- Course length: 2.82 km (1.76 miles)
- Distance: 60 laps, 169.2 km (105.6 miles)

Pole position
Driver	(New Zealand) Dave McMillan	Ralt-Ford
- Time: 0.57.320

Podium
First	(New Zealand) David Oxton	Ralt-Ford
Second	(New Zealand) Paul Radisich	Ralt-Ford
Third	(New Zealand) Dave McMillan	Ralt-Ford

The 1983 New Zealand Grand Prix was a race held at the Pukekohe Park Raceway on 8 January 1983. It was the 29th running of the New Zealand Grand Prix and was run over two heats of 30 laps each, with the final results being an aggregate of the two based on points. The event was won by New Zealander David Oxton. The podium was completed by fellow Kiwis Paul Radisich and Dave McMillan.

== Classification ==
=== Qualifying ===
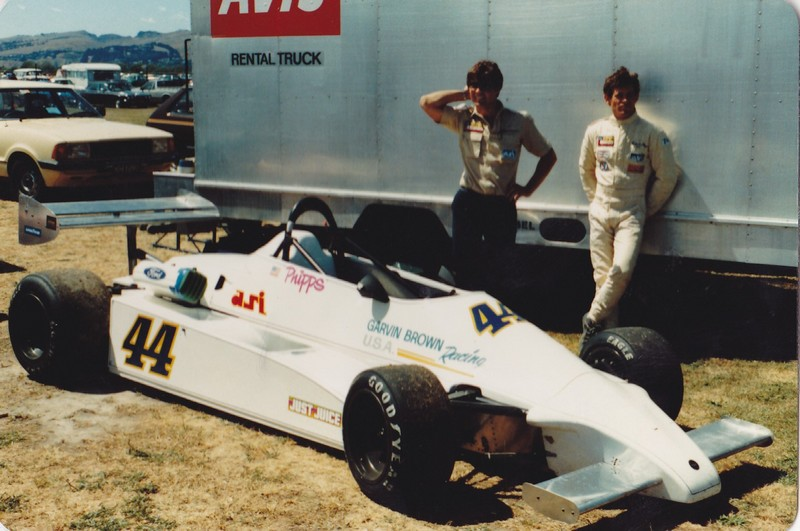
Hubert Phipps' Tiga FA82

Pos	No.	Driver	Car	Time	Grid
1	41	(New Zealand) Dave McMillan	Ralt RT4/82 / Ford BDD	0.57.32	1
2	18	(New Zealand) David Oxton	Ralt RT4/81 / Ford BDD	0.57.50	2
3	4	(Canada) Allen Berg	Ralt RT4/82 / Ford BDD	0.57.56	3
4	1	(United States) Norm Hunter	Ralt RT4/83 / Ford BDD	0.57.60	4
5	5	(New Zealand) Paul Radisich	Ralt RT4/82 / Ford BDD	0.58.20	5
6	2	(United States) Mike Rosen	Ralt RT4/82 / Ford BDD	0.58.38	6
7	3	(Australia) Charlie O'Brien	Ralt RT4/83 / Ford BDD	0.58.40	7
8	11	(New Zealand) Ken Smith	Ralt RT4/81 / Ford BDD	0.58.49	8
9	7	(Germany) Christian Danner	Ralt RT4/81 / Ford BDD	0.58.72	9
10	9	(New Zealand) Graham Watson	Ralt RT4/83 / Ford BDD	0.58.93	10
11	6	(New Zealand) Eric Morgan	Ralt RT1 / Ford BDD	0.59.07	11
12	19	(New Zealand) Grant Campbell	Ralt RT4/81 / Ford BDD	0.59.10	12
13	21	(New Zealand) Steve Cameron	Chevron B39 / Ford BDD	1.00.00	13
14	44	(United States) Hubert Phipps	Tiga FA82 / Ford BDD	1.01.66	14
15		(New Zealand) Charlie Thomasen	Chevron B49 / Ford BDD	1.03.40	15

=== Combined results ===
Pos	No.	Driver	Car	Laps	Heat 1	Heat 2	Points
1	18	(New Zealand) David Oxton	Ralt RT4/81 / Ford BDD	60	2nd	1st	35
2	5	(New Zealand) Paul Radisich	Ralt RT4/82 / Ford BDD	60	4th	2nd	25
3	41	(New Zealand) Dave McMillan	Ralt RT4/82 / Ford BDD	44	1st	DNF	20
4	9	(New Zealand) Graham Watson	Ralt RT4/83 / Ford BDD	60	8th	4th	13
5	7	(Germany) Christian Danner	Ralt RT4/81 / Ford BDD	59	6th	6th	12
6	4	(Canada) Allen Berg	Ralt RT4/82 / Ford BDD	43	3rd	DNF	12
7	1	(United States) Norm Hunter	Ralt RT4/83 / Ford BDD	33	DNF	3rd	12
8	19	(New Zealand) Grant Campbell	Ralt RT4/81 / Ford BDD	42	DNF	5th	8
9	3	(Australia) Charlie O'Brien	Ralt RT4/83 / Ford BDD	36	5th	DNF	8
10		(New Zealand) Charlie Thomasen	Chevron B49 / Ford BDD	50	DNF	7th	4
11	11	(New Zealand) Ken Smith	Ralt RT4/81 / Ford BDD	45	7th	DNF	4
12	6	(New Zealand) Eric Morgan	Ralt RT1 / Ford BDD	30	9th	DNS	2
13	21	(New Zealand) Steve Cameron	Chevron B39 / Ford BDD	43	10th	DNF	1
NC	44	(United States) Hubert Phipps	Tiga FA82 / Ford BDD	46	DNF	DNF	
NC	2	(United States) Mike Rosen	Ralt RT4/82 / Ford BDD	3	DNF	DNS	

Preceded by 1982 New Zealand Grand Prix	New Zealand Grand Prix; 1983	Succeeded by 1984 New Zealand Grand Prix
