= 1993 Japanese Formula 3000 Championship =

The 1993 Japanese Formula 3000 Championship was scheduled over 11 rounds and contested over 9 rounds. 22 different teams, 30 different drivers, 3 different chassis and 3 different engines competed.

== Calendar ==
All rounds took place at venues located within the country of Japan.

Race No	Track	Race name	Date	Laps	Distance	Time	Speed	Winner	Pole position	Fastest race lap
1	Suzuka	Million Card Cup Race Round 1 Suzuka	21 March 1993	35	5.864=205.241 km	1'04:11.297	191.849 km/h	Ross Cheever	Marco Apicella	Eddie Irvine
2	Fuji	Cabin International Formula Cup	11 April 1993	45	4.470=201.15 km	0'59:02.025	204.442 km/h	Kazuyoshi Hoshino	Takuya Kurosawa	Masahiko Kageyama
3	Mine	F3000 Mine All Star	9 May 1993	50	3.239=161.8 km	1'24:52.084	114.389 km/h	Mauro Martini	Eddie Irvine	Naoki Hattori
4	Suzuka	Million Card Cup Race Round 2 Suzuka	23 May 1993	35	5.864=205.241 km	1'04:22.711	191.282 km/h	Eddie Irvine	Eddie Irvine	Marco Apicella
	Autopolis	Cosmo Oil Formula Cup in Racing Park	18 July 1993	cancelled
5	Sugo	Sugo Inter Formula	1 August 1993	54	3.704=200.016 km	1'05:38.280	182.836 km/h	Marco Apicella	Eddie Irvine	Eddie Irvine
	Fuji	RRC Fuji Champions	15 August 1993	cancelled due to fog
6	Fuji	Fuji Inter F3000	5 September 1993	45	4.470=201.15 km	0'59:44.294	202.031 km/h	Toshio Suzuki	Heinz-Harald Frentzen	Naoki Hattori
7	Suzuka	Million Card Cup Race Round 3 Suzuka	26 September 1993	35	5.864=205.241 km	1'04:46.558	190.108 km/h	Ross Cheever	Ross Cheever	Heinz-Harald Frentzen
8	Fuji	International F3000 Fuji Final	17 October 1993	44	4.470=196.68 km	0'58:05.324	203.151 km/h	Kazuyoshi Hoshino	Eddie Irvine	Heinz-Harald Frentzen
9	Suzuka	Million Card Cup Race Final Round Suzuka	14 November 1993	35	5.864=205.241 km	1'04:40.839	190.389 km/h	Thomas Danielsson	Ross Cheever	Masahiko Kageyama

Note:

The weekend in Fuji with the race cancelled on September, 5 saw only practice and qualification sections.

== Final point standings ==
=== Driver ===
For every race points were awarded: 9 points to the winner, 6 for runner-up, 4 for third place, 3 for fourth place, 2 for fifth place and 1 for sixth place. No additional points were awarded. The best 6 results count. One driver had a point deduction, which is given in ().

Place	Name	Country	Team	Chassis	Engine	R1	R2	R3	R4	R5	R6	R7	R8	R9	Total points
1	Kazuyoshi Hoshino	Japan	Team Impul	Lola	Mugen Honda	6	9	-	6	-	-	2	9	-	32
2	Eddie Irvine	United Kingdom	Team Cerumo	Lola	Mugen Honda	4	4	-	9	-	(1)	6	6	3	32
3	Ross Cheever	United States	Promise&Reynard	Reynard	Mugen Honda	9	-	3	-	4	-	9	-	6	31
4	Marco Apicella	Italy	Dome	Dome	Mugen Honda	-	6	-	2	9	-	3	3	-	23
5	Toshio Suzuki	Japan	Universal Racing	Lola	Cosworth	1	3	-	-	3	9	4	2	-	22
6	Thomas Danielsson	Sweden	Team Take One	Lola	Cosworth	-	2	-	4	-	-	-	4	9	19
7	Mauro Martini	Italy	Team Nova	Lola	Mugen Honda	-	-	9	-	-	-	-	1	-	10
8	Andrew Gilbert Scott	United Kingdom	Stellar International	Lola	Mugen Honda	2	1	-	3	-	-	-	-	4	10
9	Heinz-Harald Frentzen	Germany	Team Nova	Lola	Mugen Honda	-	-	-	-	-	6	-	-	2	8
10	Masahiko Kageyama	Japan	Nakajima Racing	Reynard	Mugen Honda	-	-	1	-	6	-	-	-	-	7
11	Jeff Krosnoff	United States	Speed Star Wheel Racing	Lola	Mugen Honda	-	-	6	-	-	-	-	-	-	6
12	Roland Ratzenberger	Austria	Stellar International	Lola	Mugen Honda	-	-	-	1	-	4	1	-	-	6
13	Takuya Kurosawa	Japan	Cabin Racing/Heroes	Lola	Cosworth	3	-	-	-	2	-	-	-	-	5
14	Paulo Carcasci	Brazil	Navi Connection Racing	Reynard	Mugen Honda	-	-	4	-	-	-	-	-	-	4
15	Naoki Hattori	Japan	Le Garage Cox Racing/Mooncraft	Lola	Mugen Honda	-	-	2	-	-	2	-	-	-	4
16	Masanori Sekiya	Japan	TOM'S	Reynard	Cosworth	-	-	-	-	-	3	-	-	-	3
17	Mika Salo	Finland	Ad Racing Team Co. Ltd.	Lola	Mugen Honda	-	-	-	-	1	-	-	-	-	1
=	Katsutomo Kaneishi	Japan	Cabin Racing/Heroes	Lola	Cosworth	-	-	-	-	-	-	-	-	1	1

Note:

Kazuyoshi Hoshino became champion on countback as he had 2 wins while Eddie Irvine only had 1.

== Complete Overview ==
first column of every race	10	= grid position

second column of every race	10	= race result

R=retired NS=did not start

Place	Name	Country	Team	Chassis	Engine	(Japan)		(Japan)		(Japan)		(Japan)		(Japan)		(Japan)		(Japan)		(Japan)		(Japan)
1	Kazuyoshi Hoshino	Japan	Team Impul	Lola	Mugen Honda	3	2	3	1	10	R	2	2	5	20	11	R	6	5	3	1	11	R
2	Eddie Irvine	United Kingdom	Team Cerumo	Lola	Mugen Honda	4	3	4	3	1	R	1	1	1	15	22	6	7	2	1	2	6	4
3	Ross Cheever	United States	Promise&Reynard	Reynard	Mugen Honda	2	1	12	R	6	4	12	9	4	3	25	12	1	1	4	7	1	2
4	Marco Apicella	Italy	Dome	Dome	Mugen Honda	1	7	5	2	8	R	10	5	6	1	2	R	5	4	7	4	20	9
5	Toshio Suzuki	Japan	Universal Racing	Lola	Cosworth	6	6	2	4	2	R	7	R	15	4	8	1	3	3	16	5	26	R
6	Thomas Danielsson	Sweden	Team Take One	Lola	Cosworth	14	9	11	5	11	R	5	3	18	9	17	R	14	16	8	3	2	1
7	Mauro Martini	Italy	Team Nova	Lola	Mugen Honda	11	R	6	R	4	1	4	R	8	17	6	R	13	8	18	6	8	R
	Andrew Gilbert Scott	United Kingdom	Stellar International	Lola	Mugen Honda	7	5	7	6	7	R	8	4	11	8	13	R	12	R	6	9	4	3
9	Heinz-Harald Frentzen	Germany	Team Nova	Lola	Mugen Honda	8	R	19	R	9	R	3	8	3	14	1	2	9	10	2	12	9	5
10	Masahiko Kageyama	Japan	Nakajima Racing	Reynard	Mugen Honda	13	12	14	8	15	6	13	R	7	2	18	8	10	R	17	R	18	11
11	Jeff Krosnoff	United States	Speed Star Wheel Racing	Lola	Mugen Honda	12	14	17	13	17	2	21	13	16	18	15	11	20	11	11	13	23	15
	Roland Ratzenberger	Austria	Stellar International	Lola	Mugen Honda	15	R	16	10	5	R	16	6	9	16	3	3	11	6	19	14	3	7
13	Takuya Kurosawa	Japan	Cabin Racing/Heroes	Lola	Cosworth	5	4	1	R	3	R	14	15	2	5	10	R	8	R	-	-	-	-
14	Paulo Carcasci	Brazil	Navi Connection Racing	Reynard	Mugen Honda	18	11	9	R	16	3	17	7	17	13	4	7	15	7	9	10	7	13
	Naoki Hattori	Japan	Le Garage Cox Racing/Mooncraft	Lola	Mugen Honda	10	8	8	R	12	5	19	11	20	7	16	5	2	20	14	11	15	8
16	Masanori Sekiya	Japan	TOM'S	Reynard	Cosworth	9	10	15	7	-	-	6	R	13	23	5	4	4	18	-	-	5	R
17	Mika Salo	Finland	Ad Racing Team Co. Ltd.	Lola	Mugen Honda	19	13	21	9	23	7	18	R	10	6	7	NS	17	17	12	R	16	R
	Katsutomo Kaneishi	Japan	Cabin Racing/Heroes	Lola	Cosworth	-	-	-	-	-	-	-	-	-	-	-	-	-	-	10	8	14	6
-	Takao Wada	Japan	Super Evolution Racing	Lola	Mugen Honda	22	15	18	12	14	8	24	14	23	12	-	-	-	-	-	-	-	-
-	Kunimitsu Takahashi	Japan	Advan Sport Pal	Lola	Mugen Honda	20	R	20	11	13	9	23	12	19	10	9	9	19	9	13	18	13	R
-	Akihiko Nakaya	Japan	Team Hayashi	Lola	Judd	-	-	24	17	19	R	11	10
-	Akihiko Nakaya	Japan	Team Hayashi	Dome	Mugen Honda									21	11	12	R	23	15	5	R	10	14
-	Akira Ishikawa	Japan	Team LeMans	Reynard	Mugen Honda	21	16	10	15	24	R	9	17	22	21	14	10	18	12	21	16	21	R
-	Yasutaka Hinoi	Japan	Nakajima Racing	Reynard	Mugen Honda	23	R	23	14	20	10	20	R	14	22	20	14	21	13	20	15	22	R
-	Hisashi Wada	Japan	Team Hagiwara	Lola	Mugen Honda	17	R	13	R	18	R	22	R	12	24	19	13	16	19	15	R	17	10
-	Minoru Tanaka	Japan	Ad Racing Team Co. Ltd.	Lola	Mugen Honda	-	-	-	-	-	-	-	-	-	-	-	-	-	-	24	17	19	12
-	Anthony Reid	United Kingdom	Super Evolution Racing	Lola	Mugen Honda	-	-	-	-	-	-	-	-	-	-	21	R	22	14	22	R	12	R
-	Emanuele Naspetti	Italy	Dome	Dome	Mugen Honda	16	17	22	16	21	R	15	R	-	-	-	-	-	-	-	-	-	-
-	Naozumi Itou	Japan	Giza Racing	Lola	Mugen Honda	24	R	25	18	22	R	25	16	24	19			24	R	26	20	25	R
-	Naozumi Itou	Japan	Giza Racing	Reynard	Mugen Honda											24	R
-	Masatomo Shimizu	Japan	Trident Racing	Reynard	Mugen Honda	-	-	26	19	-	-	-	-	-	-	23	R	-	-	25	R	-	-
-	Hideki Noda	Japan	TOM'S	Reynard	Cosworth	-	-	-	-	-	-	-	-	-	-	-	-	-	-	23	19	24	R
