= Paulo Carcasci =

Brazilian racing driver

Paulo Eduardo Canovas Carcasci
- Nationality: (Brazil) Brazilian
- Born: 7 January 1964 (age 62) São Paulo, Brazil
- Retired: 1996

Previous series
- 1996 1994 1991-1993 1991 1990 1989 1988-1989 1986 1985 1977-1984: Indy Lights; International Formula 3000; Formula Nippon; Japanese Formula 3 British Formula Renault Championship; GM Lotus Euroseries; British Formula 3 Formula Ford 2000; Formula Ford 1600; Karting

Championship titles
- 1991: Japanese Formula 3

Paulo Carcasci (born 7 January 1964) is a Brazilian former racing driver. Carcasci won the 1985 European FF 1600 Championship , 1988 BBC FF2000 Championship, 1991 All-Japan Formula Three Championship and the Gold Cup in Formula 3000.

== Racing career ==
Carcasci started his auto racing career in Europe in the Formula Ford 1600 in 1985. Driving a works entered Van Diemen RF85 the Brazilian won races at Cadwell Park, Castle Combe, and Brands Hatch. Carcasci won the EFDA Formula Ford Euroseries final race at Circuit Zolder. Carcasci beat future Formula 1 drivers Bertrand Gachot, Roland Ratzenberger and Damon Hill. At the 1985 Formula Ford Festival, Carcasci qualified on pole position for the final race but he did not finish. For 1986, Carcasci remained at the works Team Duckhams Van Diemen team graduating into the British Formula Ford 2000 championship. While Gachot won the championship Carcasci won races at Thruxton, Snetterton and Castle Combe.

In 1988, Carcasci returned to the British racing circuits. He ran five races in the British Formula 3. He could not achieve any notable results in the ageing Alfa Romeo powered Reynard 883. For 1989, Carcasci ran in various Formula Opel Lotus championships. achieving a seventh place in the Euro Series championship. In the British Formula 3000 championship, Carcasci competed three races. At Donington Park, he finished fourth racing for Madgwick. At Oulton Park and Brands Hatch, Carcasci was entered by Cobra Motorsport. Carcasci won the Gold Cup at Oulton Park beating Gary Brabham. At the end of the 1989 season, Carcasci was approached by Formula 1 team Life Racing Engines to drive their Life F190. Carcasci declined the invitation as the car proved to be uncompetitive.

In 1990, Carcasci joined Jason Plato at Manor Motorsport in the British Formula Renault Championship. Carcasci, again in a Van Diemen, was runner up in the championship, behind Thomas Erdos. For 1991, Carcasci moved to Japan to race in the All-Japan Formula Three Championship for the factory Toyota team, TOM'S. In the first TOM'S designed car, the 031F designed by Andrew Thorby, Carcasci won four races. At the 1991 Macau Grand Prix, he finished eleventh. Carcasci als debuted in the All-Japan F3000 Championship. In his Lola T90/50, Carcasci scored four points. In 1992, Carcasci won the second race of the season at Fuji Speedway in a Reynard 92D. Carcasci remained a third year in the series in 1993. A third place at Mine Circuit was his best result.

After racing in Japan, Carcasci returned to England testing the Nordic Racing Lola T94/50 at Snetterton. Initially signed to race both final races he eventually started one. At Autodromo do Estoril, Carcasci started the Secundo Gran Premio do Estoril do F3000 in twentieth place. He had to retire his Judd powered Lola after eight laps with an electrical problem.

In 1996, Carcasci had a single Indy Lights outing at Long Beach supporting the Grand Prix of Long Beach. After starting twelfth, the cars clutch broke down, preventing Carcasci to finish. He also competed in the Mexican Formula Three Championship in 1996.

== Formula 3 team ==
After driver/manager Tim Spouge formed SS Sports to race in the British F3, Carcasci joined the company in 1998. He was the chief engineer for Spouge and Doug Bell in 1999. The team's best result was a fourth place for Spouge at Croft Circuit in 1999. The team was dissolved at the end of the season.

== Driver management ==
In 2001, Carcasci joined One Sports Management, a racing drivers management firm. Carcasci has managed drivers such as Antônio Pizzonia, Luciano Burti and Lucas di Grassi. Carcasci was the head of the talent selection board of Petrobras. Carcasci coached drivers racing in the Super Kart Brasil series until 2015. Carcasci was responsible for the agreement between Petrobras and Koiranen GP to run young Brazilian drivers. In 2015, Carcasci joined Draco Racing as a driver coach and the Brazilian managed André Negrão.

== Complete motorsports results ==
=== American Open-Wheel racing results ===
(key) (Races in bold indicate pole position, races in italics indicate fastest race lap)

==== Indy Lights ====
Year	Team	1	2	3	4	5	6	7	8	9	10	11	12	Rank	Points	Ref
1996	RaceCars	MIA	LBH; 21	NAZ	MIS	MIL	DET	POR	CLE	TOR	TRO	VAN	LS	**38th**	**0**	

=== Complete International Formula 3000 results ===
(key) (Races in bold indicate pole position; races in italics indicate fastest lap.)

Year	Entrant	1	2	3	4	5	6	7	8	DC	Points
1994	Nordic Racing	SIL	PAU	CAT	PER	HOC	SPA	EST; Ret	MAG	NC	0
