= Thomas Danielsson =

Swedish racing driver (born 1964)

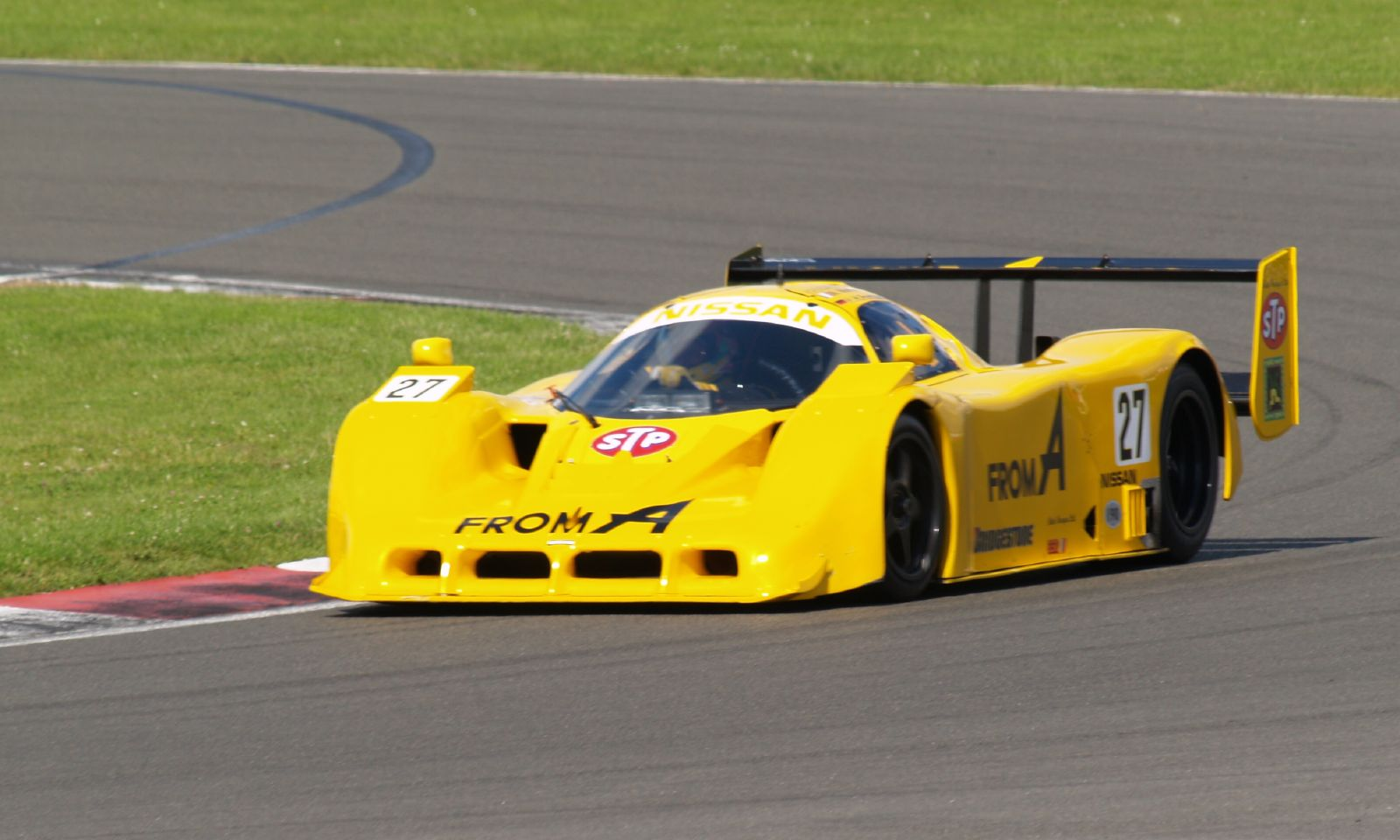

Bengt Thomas Danielsson (born 4 December 1964) is a Swedish former racing driver.

== International Formula 3000 Championship results ==
(key) (Races in bold indicate pole position) (Races in italics indicate fastest lap)

Year	Team	Chassis	Engine	1	2	3	4	5	6	7	8	9	10	11	DC	Pts
1988	Eddie Jordan Racing	Reynard 88D	Ford Cosworth	JER Ret	VLL Ret	PAU DNS	SIL 8	MNZ Ret	PER	BRH	BIR	BUG	ZOL	DIJ	NC	0
1989	Madgwick International	Reynard 89D	Ford Cosworth	SIL 1	VLL Ret	PAU 3	JER 12	PER Ret	BRH Ret	BIR Ret	SPA 6	BUG 13	DIJ 11		7th	14

== Japanese Formula 3000 Championship results ==
(key) (Races in bold indicate pole position) (Races in italics indicate fastest lap)

Year	Team	1	2	3	4	5	6	7	8	9	10	11	DC	Pts
1990	Dome	SUZ; 7	FSW; Ret	MIN; Ret	SUZ; DNQ	SUG; 2	FSW; Ret	FSW; 11	SUZ; 10	FSW; 16	SUZ; Ret		10th	6
1991	Team Nova	SUZ; Ret	AUT; 9	FSW; Ret	MIN; 19	SUZ; DNS	SUG; 4	FSW; 4	SUZ; 3	FSW; C	SUZ; 5	FSW; Ret	9th	12
1992	Team Take One	SUZ; 11	FSW; 2	MIN; Ret	SUZ; Ret	AUT; 7	SUG; 10	FSW; 5	FSW; 18	SUZ; 5	FSW; 8	FSW; 15	13th	10
1993	Team Take One	SUZ; 9	FSW; 5	MIN; Ret	SUZ; 3	AUT; C	SUG; 9	FSW; C	FSW; Ret	SUZ; 16	FSW; 3	SUZ; 1	6th	19
1994	Team 5Zigen	SUZ	FSW; 13	MIN; Ret	SUZ; 7	SUG; Ret	FSW; 10	SUZ; DNS	FSW; Ret	FSW; 9	SUZ; 5		13th	2

== Complete 24 Hours of Le Mans results ==
Year	Team	Co-drivers	Car	Class	Laps	Pos.	Class pos.
1990	(Australia) Team Schuppan (Japan) Omron Racing	(Sweden) Eje Elgh (Australia) Tomas Mezera	Porsche 962C	C1	326	15th	15th
1991	(France) Courage Compétition	(Sweden) Anders Olofsson (United Kingdom) Johnny Dumfries	Courage C26S	C2	45	DNF (engine)	DNF (engine)
