= Akihiko Nakaya =

Japanese racing driver (born 1957)

Akihiko Nakaya (中谷明彦, Nakaya Akihiko; born November 3, 1957) is a successful racing driver in the Japanese Touring Car Championship and F3000, as well as regular presenter on the Japanese motoring show Best Motoring. Nakaya offered a distinctively analytical approach to reviewing cars on the show, providing detailed analyses of various vehicle components and explaining certain driving styles that were best suited to their characteristics. He was a regular driver of Mitsubishi Lancer Evolutions during Best Motoring races involving the I, II, III, IV, V, VI (including the Tommi Makinen Edition), VII, and VIII of the car, often recording lap times significantly quicker than other drivers of the same vehicle.

Nakaya's name was applied to a special preface-build of the Mitsubishi FTO, the Nakaya-Tune FTO, which appeared in 1997.

Nakaya was considered for a Formula One ride with Brabham in 1992, but the FIA would not grant him a superlicense on the grounds that Japanese F3000 (today the Super Formula Championship) was, at the time, not considered a stepping stone to F1. The ride eventually went to Giovanna Amati, who was more known for her gender than talent and was replaced three races into the season by future World Champion Damon Hill.

== Career results ==
=== Complete World Touring Car Championship results ===
(key) (Races in bold indicate pole position) (Races in italics indicate fastest lap)

Year	Team	Car	1	2	3	4	5	6	7	8	9	10	11	DC	Points
1987	Ralliart Australia	Mitsubishi Starion Turbo	MNZ	JAR	DIJ	NUR	SPA	BNO	SIL	BAT ovr:5 cls:4	CLD ovr:9 cls:5	WEL		NC	0
1987	(Japan) STP Mitsubishi Ralliart	Mitsubishi Starion Turbo											FJI ovr:10 cls:5	NC	0

† Not eligible for series points

=== Complete Japanese Formula 3 results ===
(key) (Races in bold indicate pole position) (Races in italics indicate fastest lap)

Year	Team	Engine	1	2	3	4	5	6	7	8	9	10	DC	Pts
1987	Le Garage Cox Racing Team	VW	SUZ; 1	TSU; 3	**FUJ**; 1	SUZ; Ret	SUG; 13	SEN; Ret	MIN; 15	TSU; 3	SUZ; 6	SUZ; Ret	5th	70
1988	Le Garage Cox Racing Team	Mugen	SUZ; 7	TSU; 8	**FUJ**; 3	SUZ; 2	**SUG**; 1	TSU; 2	SEN; Ret	**SUZ**; 2	MIN; 2	SUZ; 1	1st	46

=== Japanese Formula 3000 Championship results ===
(key) (Races in bold indicate pole position) (Races in italics indicate fastest lap)

Year	Team	1	2	3	4	5	6	7	8	9	10	11	DC	Pts
1989	Marlboro Team Nova	SUZ; 10	FUJ; 11	**MIN**; Ret	SUZ; 8	SUG; 2	FUJ; 7	SUZ; Ret	SUZ; 9				10th	6
1990	Team Take One	SUZ; Ret	FUJ; 13	MIN; 8	SUZ; Ret	SUG; 5	FUJ; 4	FUJ; Ret	SUZ; 8	FUJ; Ret	SUZ; Ret		12th	5
1991	Cox Racing Team	SUZ; 16	**AUT**; 1	FUJ; Ret	**MIN**; Ret	SUZ; 7	SUG; 3	FUJ; 8	SUZ; 4	FUJ; C	SUZ; Ret	FUJ; 15	6th	16
1992	Cox Racing Team	SUZ; Ret	FUJ; DNQ	MIN; 11	SUZ; Ret	AUT; Ret	SUG; 8	FUJ; Ret	FUJ; 9	SUZ; Ret	FUJ; Ret	FUJ; 8	NC	0
1993	Cox Racing Team	SUZ	FUJ; 17	MIN; Ret	SUZ; 10	AUT; C	SUG; 11	FUJ; C	FUJ; Ret	SUZ; 15	FUJ; Ret	SUZ; 14	NC	0
1994	Speed Star Wheel Racing Team	SUZ; 15	FUJ; 15	MIN; Ret	SUZ; 10	SUG; 10	FUJ; Ret	SUZ	FUJ	FUJ	SUZ		15th	1

=== Complete Japanese Touring Car Championship (-1993) results ===
Year	Team	Car	Class	1	2	3	4	5	6	7	8	9	DC	Pts
1986	STP Ralliart	Mitsubishi Starion Turbo	Div.3	NIS; 4	SUG; 2	TSU; 1	SEN; Ret	FUJ; Ret	SUZ; 2				?	?
1987	STP Ralliart	Mitsubishi Starion Turbo	Div.3	NIS; 1	SEN; 1	TSU; Ret	SUG; 18	FUJ; 10	SUZ; Ret				?	?
1988	STP Ralliart	Mitsubishi Starion Turbo	JTC-1	SUZ	NIS; 4	SEN; 2	TSU; Ret	SUG; Ret	FUJ; 15				?	?
1993	Auto Tech Racing	BMW M3 Sport Evolution	JTC-2	MIN; 4	AUT; 6	SUG; 6	SUZ; 6	TAI; 7	TSU; 7	TOK; 8	SEN; 22	FUJ; NC	**1st**	**134**

=== Complete Japanese Touring Car Championship (1994-) results ===
Year	Team	Car	1	2	3	4	5	6	7	8	9	10	11	12	13	14	15	16	17	18	DC	Pts
1994	Team Take One	BMW 318i	AUT; 1; 11	AUT; 2 Ret	SUG; 1; 10	SUG; 2 Ret	TOK; 1; 13	TOK; 2; 12	SUZ; 1 Ret	SUZ; 2; 21	MIN; 1; 10	MIN; 2; 5	AID; 1 Ret	AID; 2; 8	TSU; 1; 12	TSU; 2 Ret	SEN; 1; 10	SEN; 2; 9	FUJ; 1 Ret	FUJ; 2; 23	20th	14
1995	Auto Tech Racing	BMW 318i	FUJ; 1; 16	FUJ; 2 Ret	SUG; 1 Ret	SUG; 2 Ret	TOK; 1; 5	TOK; 2; 5	SUZ; 1; 8	SUZ; 2; 7	MIN; 1; 4	MIN; 2 Ret	AID; 1 Ret	AID; 2 DNS	SEN; 1; 9	SEN; 2; 8	FUJ; 1 Ret	FUJ; 2; 14			12th	31
1996	Auto Tech Racing	BMW 318i	FUJ; 1; 13	FUJ; 2; 13	SUG; 1; 7	SUG; 2 Ret	SUZ; 1 Ret	SUZ; 2 Ret	MIN; 1; 17	MIN; 2; 5	SEN; 1; 1	SEN; 2; 19	TOK; 1; 5	TOK; 2; 7	FUJ; 1; 9	FUJ; 2; 8					10th	40
1997	Auto Tech Racing	BMW 318i	FUJ; 1	FUJ; 2	AID; 1	AID; 2	SUG; 1	SUG; 2	SUZ; 1	SUZ; 2	MIN; 1 Ret	MIN; 2; 8	SEN; 1 Ret	SEN; 2 DNS	TOK; 1	TOK; 2	FUJ; 1	FUJ; 2			17th	3
1998	Object T	Toyota Corona EXiV	FUJ; 1	FUJ; 2	MOT	SUG; 1 Ret	SUG; 2 Ret	SUZ; 1 Ret	SUZ; 2; 6	MIN; 1; 7	MIN; 2 Ret	AID; 8	FUJ; 6								9th	32

=== Complete All-Japan GT Championship results ===
(key)

Year	Team	Car	Class	1	2	3	4	5	6	7	DC	Pts
1998	Team Taeivon Ralliart	Mitsubishi FTO	GT300	SUZ; 3	FUJ; C	SEN; 8	FUJ; Ret	MOT; Ret	MIN; 6	SUG; 2	5th	37
1999	Team Taeivon Ralliart	Mitsubishi FTO	GT300	SUZ; 2	FUJ	SUG; 5	MIN; Ret	FUJ; 3	TAI; 8	MOT; 7	6th	42
2000	Hitotsuyama Racing	McLaren F1 GTR	GT500	MOT; 14	FUJ; 11	SUG; Ret	FUJ; Ret	TAI; 17	MIN; 10	SUZ; Ret	23rd	1
2001	Hitotsuyama Racing	McLaren F1 GTR	GT500	TAI; 10	FUJ; 13	SUG; Ret	FUJ	MOT; Ret	SUZ; Ret	MIN	26th	1

=== Complete Bathurst 1000 results ===
Year	Car#	Team	Co-Drivers	Car	Class	Laps	Pos.	Class Pos.
1986	53	(Australia) Mitsubishi Ralliart	(Australia) Brad Jones	Mitsubishi Starion Turbo	B	61	DNF	DNF
1987	16	Ralliart Australia	(Australia) Gary Scott (Australia) John French	Mitsubishi Starion Turbo	1	154	5th	4th

=== Complete 24 Hours of Le Mans results ===
Year	Team	Co-drivers	Car	Class	Laps	Pos.	Class pos.
1989	(Switzerland) Brun Motorsport (Japan) From-A Racing	(Germany) Harald Grohs (South Africa) Sarel van der Merwe	Porsche 962C	C1	78	DNF	DNF
1997	(Japan) Team Lark McLaren	(United Kingdom) Gary Ayles (Japan) Keiichi Tsuchiya	McLaren F1 GTR	LMGT1	88	DNF	DNF
1999	(Japan) Team Goh	(Japan) Hiroki Katoh (Japan) Hiro Matsushita	BMW V12 LM	LMP	223	DNF	DNF
