= Mauro Martini =

Italian racing driver

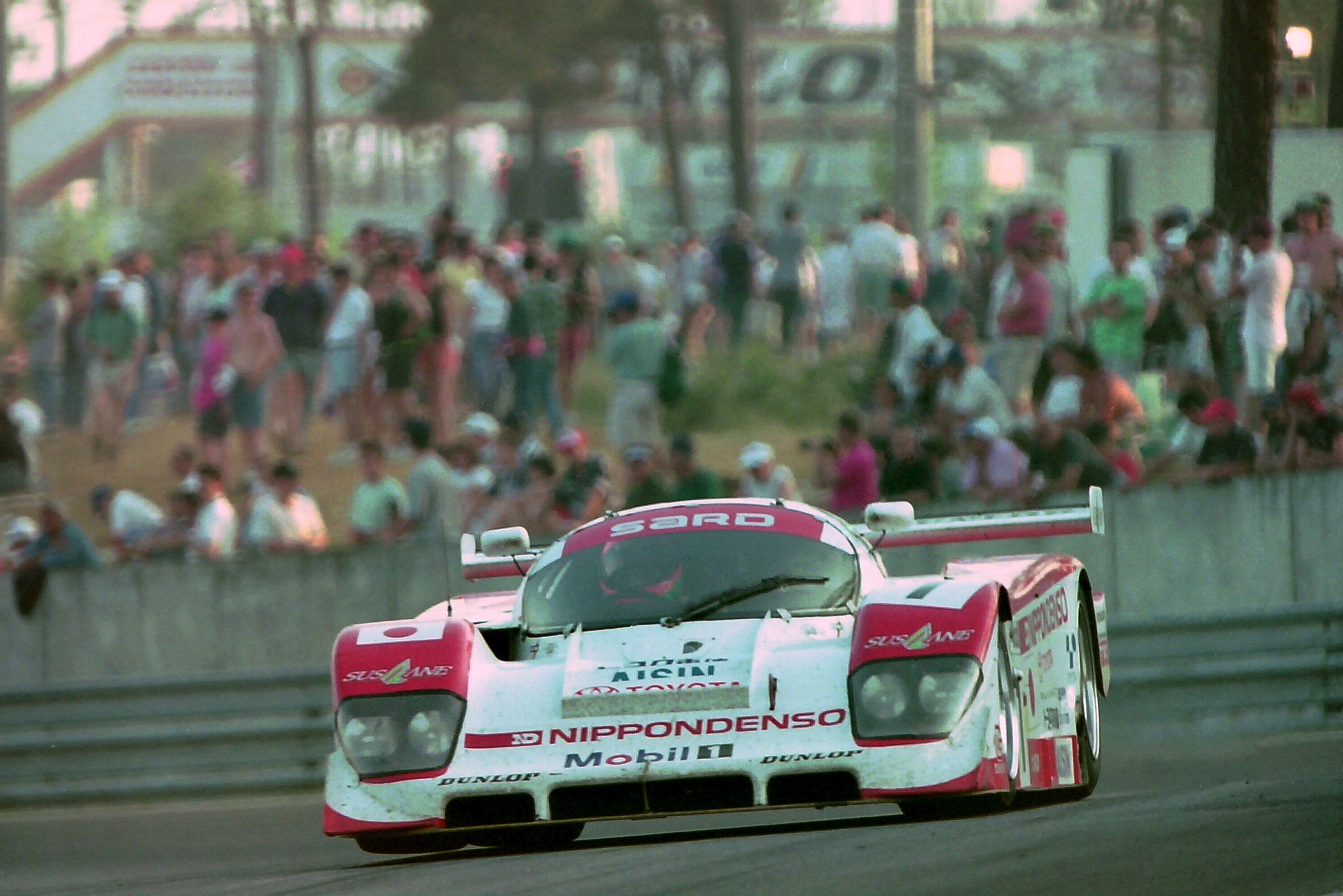
- Nationality: Italian
- Born: 17 May 1964 (age 62)

24 Hours of Le Mans career
- Years: 1991, 1993-1996
- Teams: TWR Suntec Jaguar, SARD
- Best finish: 2nd (1994)
- Class wins: 2 (1993, 1994)

Mauro Martini (born 17 May 1964) is a former Italian race car driver.

Highlights of Martini's career included placing runner-up in both the Italian Formula Three Championship and the Formula 3 European Cup, both in 1988. He was third in the 1990 Japanese Formula 3000 Championship, later won the championship in 1992 and was second with Toyota at the 1994 24 Hours of Le Mans. His last year of racing was in 1997.

== 24 Hours of Le Mans results ==
| Year | Team | Co-drivers | Car | Class | Laps | Pos. | Class Pos. |
|---|---|---|---|---|---|---|---|
| 1991 | (United Kingdom) TWR Suntec Jaguar | (United States) Jeff Krosnoff (United Kingdom) David Leslie | Jaguar XJR-12 | C2 | 183 | DNF | DNF |
| 1993 | (Japan) Y's Racing Team (Japan) SARD Co. Ltd. | (Austria) Roland Ratzenberger (Japan) Naoki Nagasaka | Toyota 93C-V | C2 | 363 | 5th | 1st |
| 1994 | (Japan) SARD Co. Ltd. | (United States) Jeff Krosnoff (United Kingdom) Eddie Irvine | Toyota 94C-V | LMP1 | 343 | 2nd | 1st |
| 1995 | (Japan) SARD Co. Ltd. | (United States) Jeff Krosnoff (Italy) Marco Apicella | Toyota Supra LM | GT1 | 264 | 14th | 6th |
| 1996 | (Japan) Team Menicon SARD Co. Ltd. | (France) Pascal Fabre (France) Alain Ferté | SARD MC8-R-Toyota | GT1 | 256 | 24th | 15th |

Sporting positions
| Preceded by Ukyo Katayama | Japanese Formula 3000; Champion; 1992 | Succeeded by Kazuyoshi Hoshino |
