= 1992 Japanese Formula 3000 Championship =

Motor racing competition

The 1992 Japanese Formula 3000 Championship was the twentieth season of premier Japanese single-seater racing. It was contested over 11 rounds at four venues. 21 teams, 34 drivers, four chassis, three engines, and three tyre suppliers competed. Italian driver Mauro Martini won the series championship for Team Nova.

The season was marred by the death of 1989 All-Japan F3000 Champion Hitoshi Ogawa in a collision with Andrew Gilbert-Scott during the fourth round of the championship at Suzuka Circuit. Since Ogawa's death, no other driver has been fatally injured in a Japanese top formula race.

== Calendar ==
All races took place at venues in Japan.

Race No	Track	Race name	Date	Laps	Distance	Time	Speed	Winner	Pole position	Fastest race lap
1	Suzuka	Million Card Cup Race 2&4 Suzuka	8 March 1992	34	5.864=199.376 km	1'01:37.309	194.129 km/h	Ross Cheever	Ross Cheever	Ross Cheever
2	Fuji	Cabin International Formula Cup	12 April 1992	45	4.470=201.15 km	0'59:40.421	202.250 km/h	Paulo Carcasci	Ross Cheever	Mauro Martini
3	Mine	Nippon Shinpan Nicos Cup Rd.1 Mine All Star	10 May 1992	62	3.239=200.818 km	1'19:51.708	150.874 km/h	Eddie Irvine	Eddie Irvine	Mauro Martini
4	Suzuka	Million Card Cup Race Round 2 Suzuka	24 May 1992	26	5.864=152.464 km	0'48:32.513	188.453 km/h	Volker Weidler	Ross Cheever	Masanori Sekiya
5	Autopolis	All Japan F3000 Championship in Autopolis	19 July 1992	43	4.674=200.982 km	1'08:48.305	175.262 km/h	Marco Apicella	Eddie Irvine	Mauro Martini
6	Sugo	Nippon Shinpan Nicos Cup Rd.2 Sugo Inter Formula	2 August 1992	54	3.704=200.016 km	1'05:57.726	181.937 km/h	Volker Weidler	Ross Cheever	Takuya Kurosawa
7	Fuji	Nippon Shinpan Nicos Cup Rd.3 Fuji Champions	16 August 1992	45	4.470=201.15 km	1'00:20.632	200.004 km/h	Mauro Martini	Ross Cheever	Ross Cheever
8	Fuji	Nippon Shinpan Nicos Cup Rd.4 Fuji Inter	6 September 1992	45	4.470=201.15 km	0'59:24.637	203.146 km/h	Toshio Suzuki	Roland Ratzenberger	Mauro Martini
9	Suzuka	Million Card Cup Race Round 3 Suzuka	27 September 1992	35	5.864=205.241 km	1'04:33.949	190.727 km/h	Roland Ratzenberger	Roland Ratzenberger	Toshio Suzuki
10	Fuji	Nippon Shinpan Nicos Cup Rd.5 Fuji Final	18 October 1992	45	4.470=201.15 km	0'58:49.751	205.153 km/h	Toshio Suzuki	Eddie Irvine	Andrew Gilbert Scott
11	Suzuka	Million Card Cup Race Final Round Suzuka	15 November 1992	35	5.864=205.241 km	1'03:45.511	193.142 km/h	Naoki Hattori	Ross Cheever	Kazuyoshi Hoshino

Note: Race 4 shortened because of a crash on Lap 27 between Hitoshi Ogawa and Andrew Gilbert Scott that killed Ogawa, past the 75% distance rule.

== Final point standings ==
=== Driver ===
For every race points were awarded: 9 points to the winner, 6 for runner-up, 4 for third place, 3 for fourth place, 2 for fifth place and 1 for sixth place. No additional points were awarded. The best 7 results count. One driver had a point deduction, which are given in ().

Place	Name	Country	Team	Chassis	Engine	Tyre	(Japan)	(Japan)	(Japan)	(Japan)	(Japan)	(Japan)	(Japan)	(Japan)	(Japan)	(Japan)	(Japan)	Total points
1	Mauro Martini	Italy	Team Nova	Lola	Mugen Honda	Bridgestone	1	4	6	(1)	6	-	9	-	4	4	-	34
2	Toshio Suzuki	Japan	Universal Racing	Lola	Cosworth	Bridgestone	-	-	-	-	-	6	6	9	-	9	-	30
3	Ross Cheever	United States	Team LeMans	Reynard	Mugen Honda	Bridgestone	9	-	-	6	-	4	-	6	-	1	3	29
4	Volker Weidler	Germany	Team Nova	Lola	Mugen Honda	Bridgestone	4	-	-	9	4	9	-	-	-	-	-	26
5	Naoki Hattori	Japan	Le Garage Cox Racing/Mooncraft	Lola	Mugen Honda	Bridgestone	3								-	2	9	21
5	Naoki Hattori	Japan	Le Garage Cox Racing/Mooncraft	Reynard	Mugen Honda	Bridgestone		-	2	4	1	-	-	-				21
	Takuya Kurosawa	Japan	Cabin Racing/Heroes	Lola	Cosworth	Bridgestone	2	-	-	-	-	-	3	4	-	6	6	21
7	Roland Ratzenberger	Austria	Stellar International	Lola	Mugen Honda	Bridgestone	-	-	4	-	-	3	-	3	9	-	-	19
8	Eddie Irvine	United Kingdom	Team Cerumo	Lola	Mugen Honda	Dunlop	-	3	9	-	-	-	-	2	3	-	-	17
9	Andrew Gilbert Scott	United Kingdom	Stellar International	Lola	Mugen Honda	Bridgestone	-				3	1	-	-	6	3	-	16
9	Andrew Gilbert Scott	United Kingdom	Stellar International	Reynard	Mugen Honda	Bridgestone		-	-	3								16
10	Marco Apicella	Italy	Dome	Dome	Mugen Honda	Dunlop	-	-	1	-	9	2	-	1	-	-	-	13
11	Paulo Carcasci	Brazil	Navi Connection Racing	Reynard	Mugen Honda	Dunlop	-	9	-	-	2	-	-	-	-	-	-	11
12	Kazuyoshi Hoshino	Japan	Team Impul	Lola	Mugen Honda	Bridgestone	6	-	-	-	-	-	4	-	-	-	-	10
	Thomas Danielsson	Sweden	Team Take One	Lola	Cosworth	Dunlop	-	6	-	-	-	-	2	-	2	-	-	10
14	Heinz-Harald Frentzen	Germany	Team Nova	Lola	Mugen Honda	Bridgestone	-	-	-	-	-	-	-	-	1	-	4	5
	Mika Salo	Finland	Ad Racing Team Co. Ltd.	Reynard	Mugen Honda	Yokohama	-	-	3	-	-	-	-	-	-	-	2	5
16	Hisashi Wada	Japan	Capcom Racing	Lola	Mugen Honda	Dunlop	-	2	-	-	-	-	-	-	-	-	-	2
	Hitoshi Ogawa	Japan	Team Cerumo	Lola	Mugen Honda	Dunlop	-	-	-	2	-	-	-	-	-	-	-	2
18	Rickard Rydell	Sweden	Team Cerumo	Lola	Mugen Honda	Dunlop	-	1	-	-	-	-	-	-	-	-	-	1
	Takao Wada	Japan	Nisseki Racing	Reynard	Mugen Honda	Bridgestone	-	-	-	-	-	-	1	-	-	-	-	1
	Naohiro Furuya	Japan	Super Evolution Racing	Lola	Mugen Honda	Yokohama	-	-	-	-	-	-	-	-	-	-	1	1

== Complete overview ==
first column of every race	10	= grid position

second column of every race	10	= race result

R25=retired, but classified R=retired NC=not classified NS=did not start NQ=did not qualify DIS=disqualified (21)=place after practice, but grid position not held free

Place	Name	Country	Team	Chassis	Engine	(Japan)		(Japan)		(Japan)		(Japan)		(Japan)		(Japan)		(Japan)		(Japan)		(Japan)		(Japan)		(Japan)
1	Mauro Martini	Italy	Team Nova	Lola	Mugen Honda	7	6	14	3	3	2	8	6	5	2	3	NS	2	1	9	10	2	3	7	3	8	R
2	Toshio Suzuki	Japan	Universal Racing	Lola	Cosworth	6	R	4	R	11	R	11	7	8	R	8	2	4	2	7	1	10	17	5	1	12	R
3	Ross Cheever	United States	Team LeMans	Reynard	Mugen Honda	1	1	1	R	2	R	1	2	10	13	1	3	1	17	25	2	14	NS	6	6	1	4
4	Volker Weidler	Germany	Team Nova	Lola	Mugen Honda	2	3	3	R	12	R	3	1	2	3	2	1	-	-	-	-	-	-	-	-	-	-
5	Naoki Hattori	Japan	Le Garage Cox Racing/Mooncraft	Lola	Mugen Honda	3	4															7	13	2	5	2	1
5	Naoki Hattori	Japan	Le Garage Cox Racing/Mooncraft	Reynard	Mugen Honda			16	R	16	5	5	3	15	6	14	15	20	10	10	7
	Takuya Kurosawa	Japan	Cabin Racing/Heroes	Lola	Cosworth	4	5							4	R	3	18	3	4	2	3	9	R	3	2	3	2
	Takuya Kurosawa	Japan	Cabin Racing/Heroes	Dome	Cosworth			12	R	13	R	12	R
7	Roland Ratzenberger	Austria	Stellar International	Lola	Mugen Honda	29	NQ	8	13	8	3	15	R	7	R	5	4	8	R	1	4	1	1	9	R25	4	R
8	Eddie Irvine	United Kingdom	Team Cerumo	Lola	Mugen Honda	12	8	2	4	1	1	2	R	1	R	4	R	8	7	4	5	4	4	1	11	6	R
9	Andrew Gilbert Scott	United Kingdom	Stellar International	Lola	Mugen Honda	8	7							9	4	6	6	5	11	5	8	3	2	8	4	10	12
9	Andrew Gilbert Scott	United Kingdom	Stellar International	Reynard	Mugen Honda			13	R	17	7	7	4
10	Marco Apicella	Italy	Dome	Dome	Mugen Honda	15	9	22	R	4	6	19	11	3	1	7	5	10	8	8	6	6	R	4	R18	5	R
11	Paulo Carcasci	Brazil	Navi Connection Racing	Lola	Mugen Honda	17	NS
11	Paulo Carcasci	Brazil	Navi Connection Racing	Reynard	Mugen Honda			7	1	15	R	16	9	18	5	13	9	11	R	11	R	15	8	13	9	17	R
12	Kazuyoshi Hoshino	Japan	Team Impul	Lola	Mugen Honda	5	2					6	R	17	R	9	7	6	3	6	R
12	Kazuyoshi Hoshino	Japan	Team Impul	Reynard	Mugen Honda			5	R	27	NQ
12	Kazuyoshi Hoshino	Japan	Team Impul	Lola	Cosworth																	8	R	14	12	9	13
	Thomas Danielsson	Sweden	Team Take One	Lola	Cosworth	16	11	10	2	9	R	21	R	21	7	15	10	9	5	3	18	5	5	15	8	16	R15
14	Heinz-Harald Frentzen	Germany	Team Nova	Lola	Mugen Honda	-	-	-	-	-	-	-	-	-	-	-	-	-	-	-	-	17	6	11	7	11	3
	Mika Salo	Finland	Ad Racing Team Co. Ltd.	Reynard	Mugen Honda	11	R	15	15	10	4	4	R	22	10	19	R	12	18	16	17	12	7	19	15	13	5
16	Hisashi Wada	Japan	Capcom Racing	Lola	Mugen Honda	25	R	9	5	14	9	20	R	20	12	18	16	14	16	14	13	20	11	25	R21	23	11
	Hitoshi Ogawa	Japan	Team Cerumo	Lola	Mugen Honda	-	-	-	-	-	-	10	5	-	-	-	-	-	-	-	-	-	-	-	-	-	-
18	Rickard Rydell	Sweden	Team Cerumo	Lola	Mugen Honda	18	16	19	6	6	R	-	-	-	-	-	-	-	-	-	-	-	-	-	-	-	-
	Takao Wada	Japan	Nisseki Racing	Ralt	Mugen Honda	28	NQ	24	14
	Takao Wada	Japan	Nisseki Racing	Reynard	Mugen Honda					26	10	18	12	16	8	17	13	24	6	18	16	22	NS	24	10	19	R
	Naohiro Furuya	Japan	Super Evolution Racing	Lola	Mugen Honda	23	R19	-	-	-	-	17	8	-	-	21	19	(21)	NS	17	R	19	14	21	16	20	6
-	Yoshihiro Tachi	Japan	Navi Connection Racing	Lola	Mugen Honda	20	R	11	7	19	R	13	R	-	-	-	-	-	-	23	R	23	10	23	R23	24	R
-	Kunimitsu Takahashi	Japan	Advan Sport Pal	Lola	Mugen Honda	24	15	23	R	18	R	24	R	19	15	20	R	22	12	12	11	18	R	18	R22	21	7
-	Akihiko Nakaya	Japan	Le Garage Cox Racing/Mooncraft	Lola	Mugen Honda	9	R					26	R
-	Akihiko Nakaya	Japan	Le Garage Cox Racing/Mooncraft	Reynard	Mugen Honda			DIS	-	25	11			14	R	10	8	19	R	15	9	13	R	12	R	22	8
-	Masanori Sekiya	Japan	Team Hagiwara	Reynard	Judd	13	R18	17	8	7	8	9	10	11	R	16	11	21	R	21	12	11	R	16	13	18	R
-	Keiji Matsumoto	Japan	Dome	Dome	Mugen Honda	19	13	21	R	20	R	22	R	6	R	11	R	18	9	13	R	21	9	10	14	7	NC
-	Minoru Tanaka	Japan	Team Take One	Lola	Cosworth	14	10	26	10	24	R	23	R	12	9	22	R	13	15	19	R	16	12	20	19	15	14
-	Jeff Krosnoff	United States	Speed Star Wheel Racing	Lola	Mugen Honda	10	12	6	9	5	R	14	R13	13	11	12	14	17	R	DIS	-	-	-	17	R24	14	10
-	Shinji Nakano	Japan	Nakajima Racing	Ralt	Mugen Honda	27	NQ	25	12	22	R	27	NQ
-	Shinji Nakano	Japan	Nakajima Racing	Reynard	Mugen Honda									23	R	24	12	25	13	22	14	25	16	22	17	25	9
-	Hideo Fukuyama	Japan	Team Noji International	Lola	Mugen Honda	22	14	18	R	23	R	DIS	-	-	-	-	-	-	-	-	-	-	-	26	20	-	-
-	Syunji Kasuya	Japan	Team Noji International	Lola	Mugen Honda	-	-	-	-	-	-	-	-	26	R	25	17	23	14	24	15	24	15	-	-	26	R
-	Yoshimichi Fujinaga	Japan	Team Hagiwara	Ralt	Mugen Honda	-	-	-	-	21	R	25	14	24	16	26	NQ	DIS	-	DIS	-	-	-	-	-	-	-
-	Tom Kristensen	Denmark	Navi Connection Racing	Lola	Mugen Honda	-	-	-	-	-	-	-	-	25	14	23	R	15	R	-	-	-	-	-	-	-	-
-	Katsunori Iketani	Japan	Cobra Racing	Lola	Mugen Honda	26	17	DIS	-	-	-	-	-	-	-	-	-	-	-	-	-	-	-	-	-	-	-
-	Katsutomo Kaneishi	Japan	Team Nova	Lola	Mugen Honda	21	R	20	R	-	-	-	-	-	-	-	-	16	R	20	R	-	-	-	-	-	-
