= Dave McMillan =

New Zealand racing driver

Dave McMillan (born 18 May 1944) is a New Zealand former racing driver.

Throughout the 1970s, McMillan raced Formula Fords in his native New Zealand during the northern winter and raced Super Vees in America in the northern summer. In 1979, he placed ninth in the USAC Mini Indy Super Vee series and eighth in the SCCA Formula Super Vee Championship. In 1980, he began racing in Formula Pacific in his native New Zealand, which at the time used Formula Atlantic rules where Super Vee cars were legal. McMillan won the 1980 championship in his Super Vee car and finished third in American Super Vee. In 1982, he won the American CASC North American Formula Atlantic Championship in a Cosworth BDA powered Ralt. In 1983, he finished fourth in Formula Pacific and in 1984 he finished fifth. He continued to work other jobs in racing, eventually moving to the United States to work in the Indy Lights series.

McMillan was the New Zealand Gold Star Champion in 1976/77, 1978/79 and 1979/80 and the winner of the New Zealand Grand Prix in 1981.

McMillan is an inductee of the New Zealand Motorsports Wall of Fame.

McMillan has two daughters, Olivia (b. 1990) and Cassidy (b. 1994)

== Racing record ==
=== Complete USAC Mini-Indy Series results ===
Year	Entrant	1	2	3	4	5	6	7	8	Pos	Points
1979		TEX1	IRP	MIL1	POC	TEX2; 3	MIL2; 4	MIN1; 18	MIN2; 9	9th	304
1980	David Psachie	MIL; 2	POC; 11	MOH; 1	MIN1; 16	MIN2	ONT			6th	385
