= 1976 New Zealand Grand Prix =

- 22nd New Zealand Grand Prix
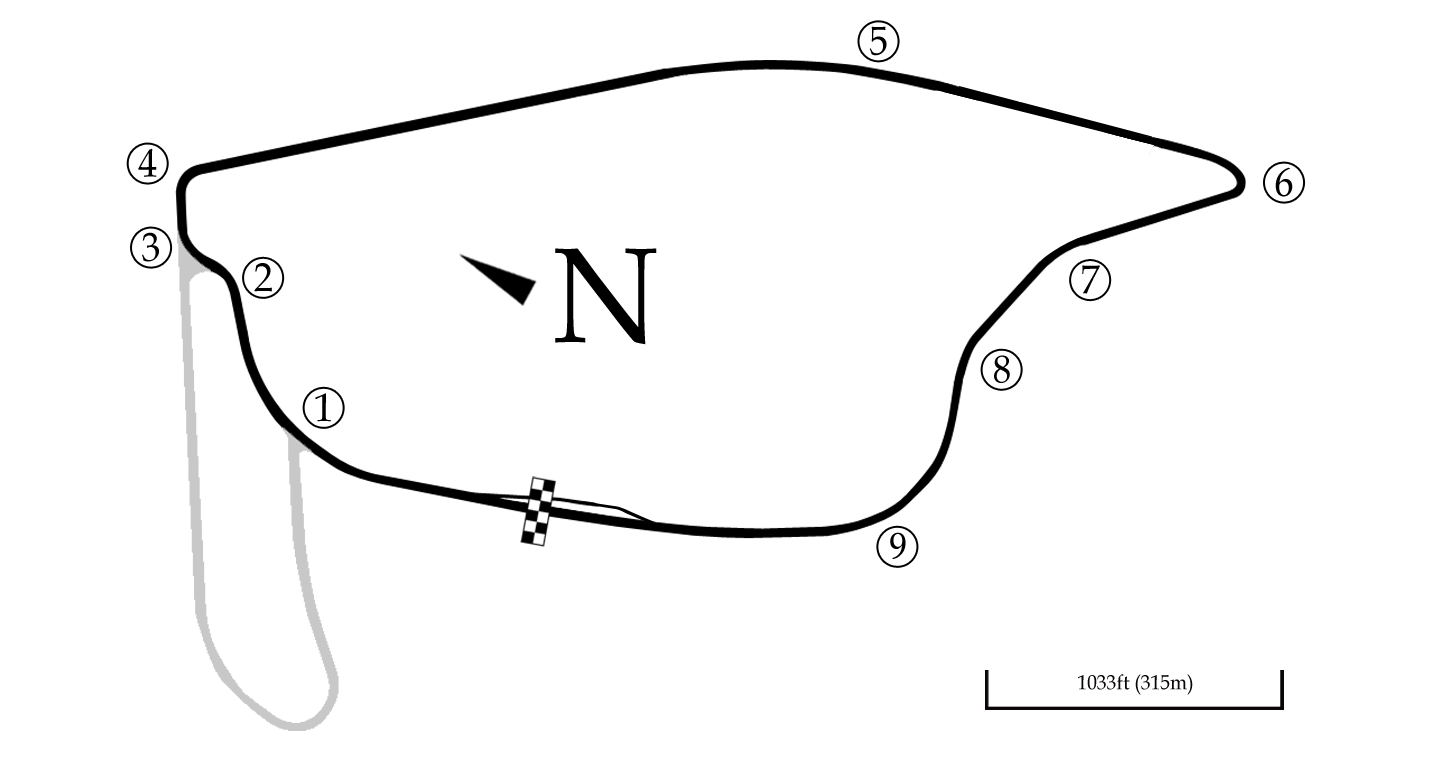

Race details
- Date: 4 January 1976
- Location: Pukekohe Park Raceway, Pukekohe, New Zealand
- Course: Permanent racing facility
- Course length: 2.82 km (1.76 miles)
- Distance: 58 laps, 164 km (102 miles)
- Weather: Light Cloud

Pole position
Driver	(New Zealand) Graeme Lawrence	Lola-Chevrolet
- Time: 1:00.9

Fastest lap
Driver	(New Zealand) Graeme Lawrence	Lola-Chevrolet
- Time: 1:01.4

Podium
First	(New Zealand) Ken Smith	Lola-Chevrolet
Second	(Australia) Bruce Allison	Lola-Chevrolet
Third	(Australia) Kevin Bartlett	Lola-Chevrolet

The 1976 New Zealand Grand Prix was a motor race held at Pukekohe Park Raceway on 4 January 1976. The race, which had 12 starters, was the opening round of the 1976 Peter Stuyvesant Series.

It was the 22nd New Zealand Grand Prix, and the first time the race was not run with the Tasman Series since 1964. New Zealander Ken Smith won his first New Zealand Grand Prix in his Lola T332 and thereby became the first New Zealander to win the race since Chris Amon back in 1969. The rest of the podium was completed by Australians Bruce Allison and Kevin Bartlett.

== Classification ==
Pos	No.	Driver	Team	Car	Laps	Time
1	11	(New Zealand) Ken Smith	La Valise Travel	Lola T332 / Chevrolet 4995cc V8	58	1hr 1min 42.5sec
2	62	(Australia) Bruce Allison	Hobby & Toyland Racing	Lola T332 / Chevrolet 4995cc V8	58	+ 19.5 s
3	5	(Australia) Kevin Bartlett		Lola T400 / Chevrolet 4995cc V8	57	+ 1 Lap
4	1	(United Kingdom) Brian Redman	Fred Opert Racing	Chevron B29 / BMW 2000cc 4cyl	57	+ 1 Lap
5	19	(New Zealand) Jim Murdoch	Begg & Allen Ltd.	Begg 018 / Chevrolet 4995cc V8	56	+ 2 Laps
6	2	(Australia) Paul Bernasconi	Sharp Calculators	Lola T400 / Chevrolet 4995cc V8	55	+ 3 Laps
7	12	(New Zealand) Baron Robertson	Robertson Racing	Elfin MR5 / Repco 4994cc V8	48	+ 10 Laps
8	9	(Australia) John McCormack	Ansett Airlines	Elfin MR6 / Repco 4994cc V8	48	+ 10 Laps
9	4	(Australia) John Edmonds		Elfin MR5 / Repco 4994cc V8	48	+ 10 Laps
10	10	(New Zealand) Robbie Booth	Michigan Motors Ltd	Elfin MR5 / Repco 4994cc V8	43	+ 15 Laps
Ret	14	(New Zealand) Graeme Lawrence	Wix Filters	Lola T332 / Chevrolet 4995cc V8	29	Engine
Ret	6	(Australia) Max Stewart	Sharp Calculators	Lola T400 / Chevrolet 4995cc V8	29	Oil Loss
DNQ	20	(New Zealand) Ross Calgher	Calgher Motor Racing	McLaren M4A / Cosworth 1840cc 4cyl		Did not qualify
DNQ	16	(New Zealand) Peter Hughes	Trans World Airlines	Brabham BT29 / Fiat 1600cc 4cyl		Did not qualify
DNA	67	(New Zealand) Graham Baker		Begg FM5 / Chevrolet 4995cc V8		Did Not Attend
DNA	17	(New Zealand) Gary Love		Begg FM4 / Chevrolet 4995cc V8		Did Not Attend

Preceded by 1975 New Zealand Grand Prix	New Zealand Grand Prix; 1976	Succeeded by 1977 New Zealand Grand Prix
