= 2013–14 New Zealand V8 season =

The 2013–14 New Zealand V8 season was the fifteenth season of the series, under the NZV8 guise. The season began at the Thunder in the Park event at Pukekohe Park Raceway on 16 November 2013 and finished at the Pukekohe Park Raceway ITM Auckland 400 V8 Supercars event on 27 April after six championship meetings. Jason Bargwanna was the reigning TLX champion, and whilst AJ Lauder won the TL Championship, graduated into the TLX class to battle for the title. The TLX Championship eventually was won by Nick Ross and the TL Championship was won by Ian Booth.

== Race calendar ==
Rnd	Circuit	Date	Map
2013			2013–14 New Zealand V8 season is located in New Zealand
1	Pukekohe Park Raceway (Pukekohe, Auckland Region)	16–17 November	2013–14 New Zealand V8 season is located in New Zealand
2014			2013–14 New Zealand V8 season is located in New Zealand
2	Teretonga Park (Invercargill, Southland Region)	11–12 January	2013–14 New Zealand V8 season is located in New Zealand
3	Timaru International Motor Raceway (Timaru, Canterbury Region)	18–19 January	2013–14 New Zealand V8 season is located in New Zealand
4	Manfeild Autocourse (Feilding, Manawatū District)	8–9 February	2013–14 New Zealand V8 season is located in New Zealand
5	Taupo Motorsport Park (Taupō, Waikato)	8–9 March	2013–14 New Zealand V8 season is located in New Zealand
6	Pukekohe Park Raceway (Pukekohe, Auckland Region)	25–27 April	2013–14 New Zealand V8 season is located in New Zealand

== Teams and drivers ==
TLX Championship
Manufacturer	Vehicle	Team	No	Driver	Rounds
Ford	Falcon (FG)	Varney Motorsport	14	(New Zealand) Shaun Varney	All
Holden	Commodore (VE)	Concept Motorsport	007	(New Zealand) Nick Ross	All
Holden	Commodore (VE)	No Fea Racing Team	84	(New Zealand) Lance Hughes	All
Toyota	Camry (XV50)	Richards Team Motorsport	1	(Australia) Jason Bargwanna	All
Toyota	Camry (XV50)	Richards Team Motorsport	87	(New Zealand) AJ Lauder	1–4, 6
TL Championship
Manufacturer	Vehicle	Team	No	Driver	Rounds
Ford	Falcon (BF)	Team Aegis Racing	2	(New Zealand) Brad Lauder	All
Ford	Falcon (BF)	Glenn Inkster Racing	4	(New Zealand) Glenn Inkster	4, 6
Ford	Falcon (BF)	Barry Holden Racing	8	(New Zealand) Barry Holden	3–5
Ford	Falcon (BF)	NDK Motorsport	17	(New Zealand) Nigel Karl	1
Ford	Falcon (BF)	Red Ant Racing	36	(New Zealand) Glenn Pelham	1
Ford	Falcon (BF)	John Hepburn Racing	52	(New Zealand) John Hepburn	3, 6
Ford	Falcon (BF)	Liam MacDonald Racing	69	(New Zealand) Liam MacDonald	2–3, 6
Ford	Falcon (BF)		73	(New Zealand) Brad Lathrope	6
Ford	Falcon (BF)	Enzed Racing Team	99	(New Zealand) Grant Molloy	All
Ford	Falcon (BF)	Brock Cooley Motorsport	111	(New Zealand) Brock Cooley	All
Holden	Commodore (VY)	Kevin Williams Racing	3	(New Zealand) Kevin Williams	6
Holden	Commodore (VY)	Todd Murphy Racing	18	(New Zealand) Todd Murphy	4
Holden	Commodore (VY)	Matthew Booth Racing	22	(New Zealand) Matthew Booth	All
Holden	Commodore (VY)	Matthew Booth Racing	28	(New Zealand) Ian Booth	All
Holden	Commodore (VY)		33	(New Zealand) Stephen Taylor	6
Holden	Commodore (VY)	Bronson Porter Racing	40	(New Zealand) Bronson Porter	All
Holden	Commodore (VY)	James McLaughlin Motorsport	51	(New Zealand) James McLaughlin	All
Holden	Commodore (VY)	Nathan Pilcher Racing	55	(New Zealand) Nathan Pilcher	2–3
Holden	Commodore (VY)	Ross Cameron Racing	74	(New Zealand) Ross Cameron	2

Changes from 2013

- Championship Winning Team Tulloch Motorsport will not be returning this season.
- TLX Championship winning driver Jason Bargwanna moves from Tulloch Motorsport to Richards Team Motorsport.
- TL Championship winning driver AJ Lauder moves from Team Aegis Racing in the TL class to Richards Team Motorsport in the TLX Class.
- Martin Short and Brett Collins from Richards Team Motorsport both will not be returning in 2013.
- No Fea Racing Team buys Tulloch Motorsports Holden Commodore (VE) with Lance Hughes driving.
- Haydn Mackenzie Motorsport will not be returning in 2013–14, neither will Haydn Mackenzie as a driver.
- Haydn Mackenzie Motorsport sold their Ford Falcon (FG) to Varney Motorsport for Shaun Varney to drive.
- Ethan Coleman Motorsport to enter sometime during the 2013–14 season.

There are multiple changes within the TL class, with many new drivers that will make the class extremely competitive.

== Calendar ==
Round		Circuit	Winning TLX driver	Winning TLX team	Winning TL driver	Winning TL team
1	R1	Pukekohe Park Raceway	(Australia) Jason Bargwanna	Richards Team Motorsport	(New Zealand) Ian Booth	Matthew Booth Racing
1	R2	Pukekohe Park Raceway	(New Zealand) Nick Ross	Concept Motorsport	(New Zealand) James McLaughlin	James McLaughlin Motorsport
1	R3	Pukekohe Park Raceway	(Australia) Jason Bargwanna	Richards Team Motorsport	(New Zealand) James McLaughlin	James McLaughlin Motorsport
2	R1	Teretonga Park	(New Zealand) Nick Ross	Concept Motorsport	(New Zealand) Brad Lauder	Team Aegis Racing
2	R2	Teretonga Park	(Australia) Jason Bargwanna	Richards Team Motorsport	(New Zealand) Liam MacDonald	Liam MacDonald Racing
2	R3	Teretonga Park	(New Zealand) Nick Ross	Concept Motorsport	(New Zealand) Liam MacDonald	MacDonald Racing Team
3	R1	Timaru International Motor Raceway	(Australia) Jason Bargwanna	Richards Team Motorsport	(New Zealand) John Hepburn	John Hepburn Racing
3	R2	Timaru International Motor Raceway	(Australia) Jason Bargwanna	Richards Team Motorsport	(New Zealand) James McLaughlin	James McLaughlin Motorsport
3	R3	Timaru International Motor Raceway	(Australia) Jason Bargwanna	Richards Team Motorsport	(New Zealand) James McLaughlin	James McLaughlin Motorsport
4	R1	Manfeild Autocourse	(Australia) Jason Bargwanna	Richards Team Motorsport	(New Zealand) Glenn Inkster	Glenn Inkster Racing
4	R2	Manfeild Autocourse	(Australia) Jason Bargwanna	Richards Team Motorsport	(New Zealand) Barry Holden	Barry Holden Racing
4	R3	Manfeild Autocourse	(Australia) Jason Bargwanna	Richards Team Motorsport	(New Zealand) Barry Holden	Barry Holden Racing
5	R1	Taupo Motorsport Park	(New Zealand) Nick Ross	Concept Motorsport	(New Zealand) Bronson Porter	Bronson Porter Racing
5	R2	Taupo Motorsport Park	(Australia) Jason Bargwanna	Richards Team Motorsport	(New Zealand) Brad Lauder	Team Aegis Racing
5	R3	Taupo Motorsport Park	(Australia) Jason Bargwanna	Richards Team Motorsport	(New Zealand) James McLaughlin	James McLaughlin Motorsport
6	R1	Pukekohe Park Raceway	(New Zealand) Nick Ross	Concept Motorsport	(New Zealand) Kevin Williams	Kevin Williams Racing
6	R2	Pukekohe Park Raceway	(New Zealand) Nick Ross	Concept Motorsport	(New Zealand) Ian Booth	Matthew Booth Racing
6	R3	Pukekohe Park Raceway	(Australia) Jason Bargwanna	Richards Team Motorsport	(New Zealand) Kevin Williams	Kevin Williams Racing
6	R4	Pukekohe Park Raceway	(Australia) Jason Bargwanna	Richards Team Motorsport	(New Zealand) Glenn Inkster	Glenn Inkster Racing

== Championship standings ==
Pos	Driver	PUK1			TER			TIM			MAN			TAU			PUK2				Pts
Pos	Driver	R1	R2	R3	R1	R2	R3	R1	R2	R3	R1	R2	R3	R1	R2	R3	R1	R2	R3	R4	Pts
TLX Championship
1	(New Zealand) Nick Ross	4	1	2	1	2	1	2	2	2	2	Ret	2	1	2	2	1	1	4	2	1228
2	(Australia) Jason Bargwanna	1	2	1	Ret	1	3	1	1	1	1	1	1	2	1	1	Ret	Ret	1	1	1176
3	(New Zealand) Lance Hughes	3	5	5	4	5	4	5	4	5	3	3	3	3	3	3	2	Ret	3	3	1014
4	(New Zealand) Shaun Varney	2	4	4	3	4	Ret	4	5	4	4	2	4	4	Ret	Ret	3	2	2	4	923
5	(New Zealand) A. J. Lauder	DNS	3	3	2	3	2	3	3	3	DNS	Wth	Wth				Ret	DNS	Wth	Wth	487
TL Championship
1	(New Zealand) Ian Booth	1	7	2	5	5	6	8	7	5	4	3	3	4	5	3	5	1	2	4	1043
2	(New Zealand) James McLaughlin	2	1	1	DNS	3	1	3	1	1	6	8	9	2	3	1	Ret	3	10	7	944
3	(New Zealand) Brad Lauder	DNS	2	4	1	8	Ret	2	2	2	2	4	4	5	1	Ret	4	10	Ret	5	874
4	(New Zealand) Brock Cooley	4	8	3	4	4	3	7	10	6	Ret	Ret	5	8	Ret	5	3	9	6	3	789
5	(New Zealand) Matthew Booth	3	Ret	5	DNS	DNS	4	9	6	7	3	7	6	6	6	4	6	DSQ	8	8	706
6	(New Zealand) Grant Molloy	5	3	6	3	6	Ret	5	3	9	DNS	DNS	DNS	7	7	6	11	8	Ret	Ret	656
7	(New Zealand) Bronson Porter	8	4	Ret	2	2	Ret	4	Ret	4	5	6	8	1	4	7	Ret	Wth	Wth	Wth	639
8	(New Zealand) Liam MacDonald				6	1	1	6	8	8							9	7	5	9	481
9	(New Zealand) Barry Holden							DNS	5	DNS	8	1	1	3	2	2					432
10	(New Zealand) Glenn Inkster										1	2	2				2	Ret	3	1	411
11	(New Zealand) John Hepburn							1	4	3							7	4	4	6	384
12	(New Zealand) Kevin Williams																1	2	1	2	133
13	(New Zealand) Glenn Pelham	6	5	7																	136
14	(New Zealand) Todd Murphy										7	5	7								133
15	(New Zealand) Nigel Karl	7	6	8																	126
16	(New Zealand) Steve Taylor																10	5	7	Ret	124
17	(New Zealand) Brad Lathrope																8	6	9	Ret	120
18	(New Zealand) Nathan Pilcher																				0
19	(New Zealand) Ross Cameron				DNS	Wth	Wth														0
Pos	Driver	R1	R2	R3	R1	R2	R3	R1	R2	R3	R1	R2	R3	R1	R2	R3	R1	R2	R3	R4	Pts
Pos	Driver	PUK1			TER			TIM			MAN			TAU			PUK2				Pts

Colour	Result
Gold	Winner
Silver	Second place
Bronze	Third place
Green	Points classification
Blue	Non-points classification
Blue	Non-classified finish (NC)
Purple	Retired, not classified (Ret)
Red	Did not qualify (DNQ)
Red	Did not pre-qualify (DNPQ)
Black	Disqualified (DSQ)
White	Did not start (DNS)
White	Withdrew (WD)
White	Race cancelled (C)
Blank	Did not practice (DNP)
Blank	Did not arrive (DNA)
Blank	Excluded (EX)

**Bold** - Pole position
Italics - Fastest lap
