= 1979 New Zealand Grand Prix =

- 25th New Zealand Grand Prix
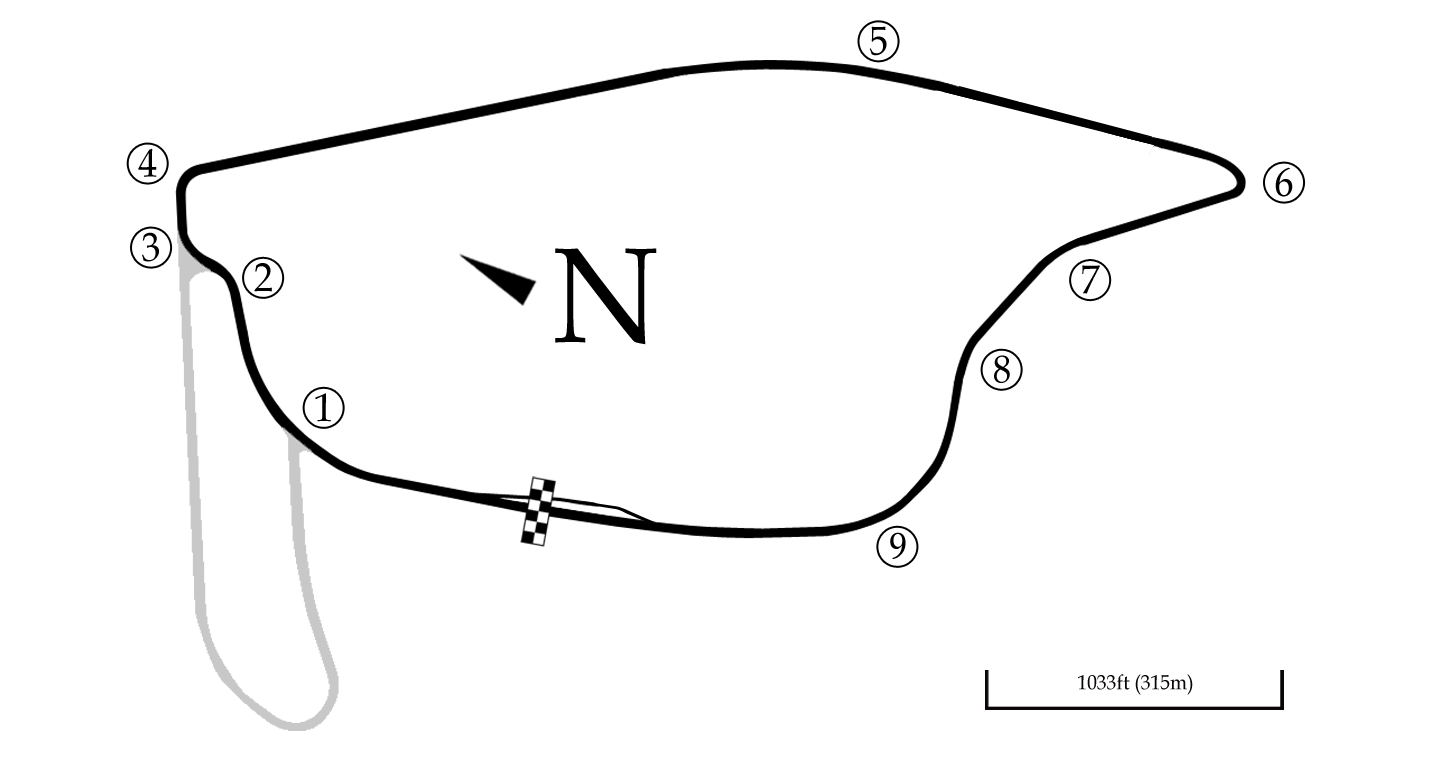

Race details
- Date: 6 January 1979
- Location: Pukekohe Park Raceway, Pukekohe, New Zealand
- Course: Permanent racing facility
- Course length: 2.82 km (1.76 miles)
- Distance: 30 laps, 84.6 km (52.8 miles)

Pole position
Driver	(Italy) Teo Fabi	March-Ford
- Time: 0.58.0

Podium
First	(Italy) Teo Fabi	March-Ford
Second	(Australia) Larry Perkins	March-Ford
Third	(New Zealand) Brett Riley	March-Ford

The 1979 New Zealand Grand Prix was a race held at the Pukekohe Park Raceway on 6 January 1979. The race had 15 starters.

It was the 25th New Zealand Grand Prix. The race was won by Italian Teo Fabi for the first time in the March 782. The rest of the podium was completed by Australian Larry Perkins and New Zealander Brett Riley.

== Classification ==
=== Qualifying ===
Pos	No.	Driver	Team	Car	Time	Gap
1	3	(Italy) Teo Fabi	March Cars	March 782 / Ford BDA Hart	0:58.0	
2	1	(Australia) Larry Perkins	Colin Giltrap Racing	March 77B / Ford BDA Nicholson	0:58.4	+ 0.4 s
3	8	(New Zealand) Brett Riley	Rentokil Ltd	March 77B / Ford BDA Nicholson	0:58.5	+ 0.5 s
4	7	(Australia) John Smith	Graham Watson Prestige Car Repairs	Ralt RT1 / Ford BDA Swindon	0:58.6	+ 0.6 s
5	18	(New Zealand) David Oxton	Vacation Hotels	Chevron B34 / Ford BDA Nicholson	0:58.7	+ 0.7 s
6	2	(Sweden) Eje Elgh	Dick Bennetts Racing with Marlboro	March 782 / Ford BDA Swindon	0:58.9	+ 0.9 s
7	41	(New Zealand) Dave McMillan	Citizen Watches/Nashua Copiers-Pan Am/Segedins Spares	Ralt RT1-36 / Ford BDA Hart	0:59.0	+ 1.0 s
8	17	(New Zealand) Steve Millen	Martini-Schollum Racing Team - Love Hertz	Chevron B42 / Ford BDA Hart	0:59.2	+ 1.2 s
9	4	(United States) Jeff Wood	Great Plains Racing	March 78B / Ford BDA Willis	0:59.4	+ 1.4 s
10	22	(New Zealand) Ross Stone	Motogard	Cuda JR3 / Ford BDA Stone	0:59.8	+ 1.8 s
11	11	(New Zealand) Ken Smith	Ken Smith Racing	March 76B / Ford BDA Nicholson	1:00.0	+ 2.0 s
12	20	(New Zealand) Hugh Owen	Owen Bros. Racing	Ralt RT1 / Ford BDA Nicholson	1:00.5	+ 2.5 s
13	12	(New Zealand) Robbie Booth		March 74B / Ford BDA Swindon	1:01.2	+ 3.2 s
14	10	(New Zealand) Howard Wood		Lyncar 010 / Ford BDA	1:01.2	+ 3.2 s
15	15	(New Zealand) Eric Morgan	E L Morgan	Chevron B29 / Ford BDA	1:01.6	+ 3.6 s

=== Race ===
Pos	No.	Driver	Team	Car	Laps	Time
1	3	(Italy) Teo Fabi	March Cars	March 782 / Ford BDA Hart	30	29min 37.5sec
2	1	(Australia) Larry Perkins	Colin Giltrap Racing	March 77B / Ford BDA Nicholson	30	+ 2.7 s
3	8	(New Zealand) Brett Riley	Rentokil Ltd.	March 77B / Ford BDA Nicholson	30	+ 12.6 s
4	7	(Australia) John Smith	Graham Watson Prestige Car Repairs	RT1 / Ford BDA Swindon	30	+ 21.7 s
5	17	(New Zealand) Steve Millen	Martini-Schollum Racing Team	Chevron B42 / Ford BDA Hart	30	+ 26.5 s
6	2	(Sweden) Eje Elgh	Dick Bennetts Racing with Marlboro	March 782 / Ford BDA Swindon	30	+ 29.9 s
7	18	(New Zealand) David Oxton	Vacation Hotels	Chevron B34 / Ford BDA Nicholson	30	+ 43.7 s
8	4	(United States) Jeff Wood	Great Plains Racing	March 78B / Ford BDA Willis	30	
9	41	(New Zealand) Dave McMillan	Citizen Watches/Nashua Copiers Pan Am/Segedins Spares	Ralt RT1 / Ford BDA Hart	30	
10	22	(New Zealand) Ross Stone	Motogard	Cuda JR3 / Ford BDA Stone	30	
11	20	(New Zealand) Hugh Owen	Owen Bros. Racing	Ralt RT1 / Ford BDA Nicholson	29	+ 1 Lap
Ret	11	(New Zealand) Ken Smith	Ken Smith Racing	March 76B / Ford BDA Nicholson	17	Retired
Ret	10	(New Zealand) Howard Wood		Lyncar 010 / Ford BDA	17	Retired
Ret	15	(New Zealand) Eric Morgan	E.L. Morgan	Chevron B29 / Ford BDA	3	Retired
DNS	12	(New Zealand) Robbie Booth		March 74B / Ford BDA Swindon	0	Retired
DNA	5	(Netherlands) Michael Bleekemolen	Fred Opert Racing	Chevron B45 / Ford BDA		Did Not Attend
DNA	9	(Australia) Andrew Miedecke	Galloway Racing	Galloway HG3 / Ford BDA		Did Not Attend
DNA	16	(New Zealand) Norm Lankshear	Farers Co-op Feilding	Chevron B34 / Ford BDA		Did Not Attend

Preceded by 1978 New Zealand Grand Prix	New Zealand Grand Prix; 1979	Succeeded by 1980 New Zealand Grand Prix
