= Giltrap =

Giltrap is an English surname. Notable people with the surname include:

- Colin Giltrap (1940–2024), New Zealand businessman and philanthropist
- Gordon Giltrap (born 1948), English guitarist and composer
