= 1978 New Zealand Grand Prix =

- 24th New Zealand Grand Prix
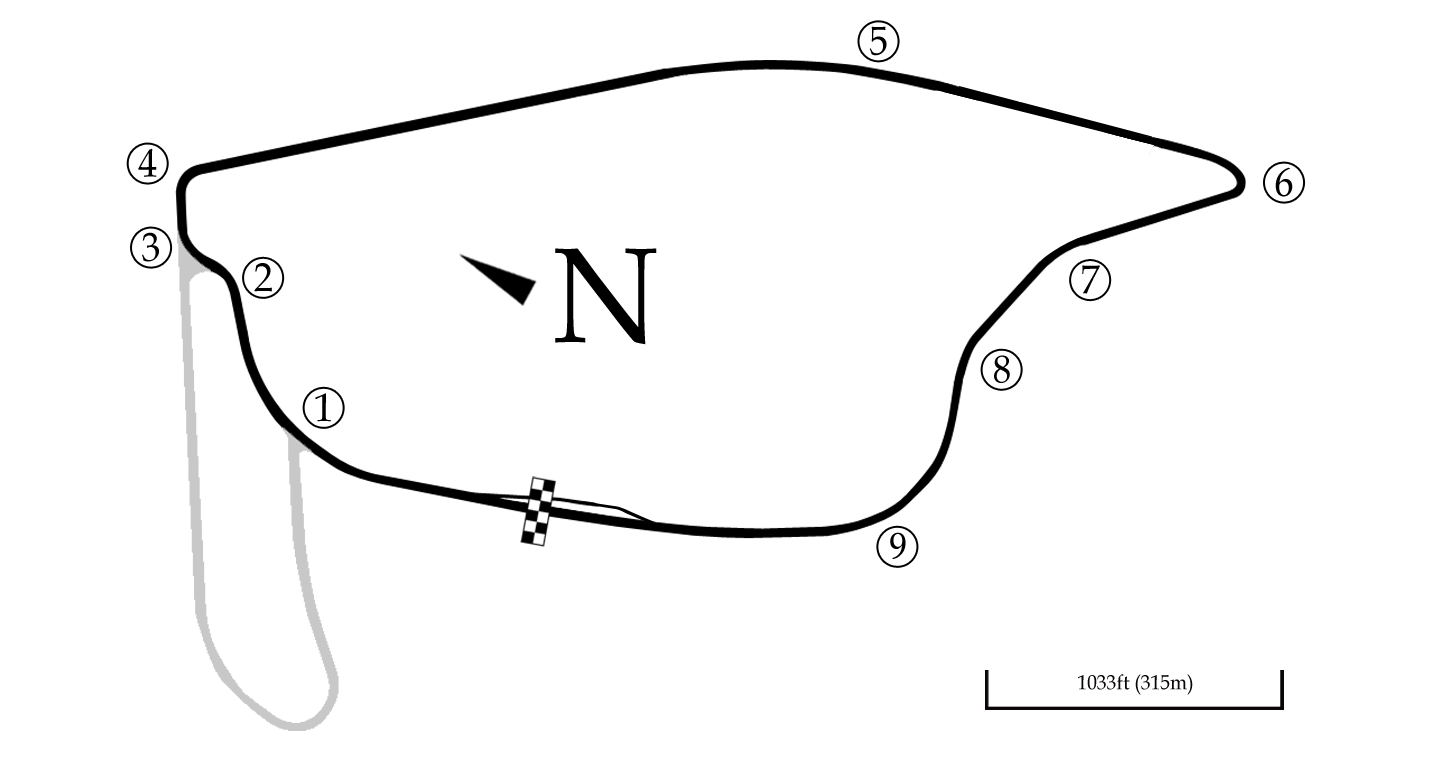

Race details
- Date: 7 January 1978
- Location: Pukekohe Park Raceway, Pukekohe, New Zealand
- Course: Permanent racing facility
- Course length: 2.82 km (1.76 miles)
- Distance: 30 laps, 84.6 km (52.8 miles)

Pole position
Driver	(New Zealand) Dave McMillan	Ralt-Ford
- Time: 1:04.1

Podium
First	(Finland) Keke Rosberg	Chevron-Ford
Second	(Australia) Larry Perkins	Ralt-Ford
Third	(United States) Danny Sullivan	March-Ford

The 1978 New Zealand Grand Prix was a race held at the Pukekohe Park Raceway on 7 January 1978. The race had 20 starters.

It was the 24th New Zealand Grand Prix. The race was won by future Formula One World Champion Keke Rosberg for the second time in succession in the Chevron B39. The rest of the podium was completed by Australian Larry Perkins and American Danny Sullivan.

== Classification ==
=== Qualifying ===
Pos	No.	Driver	Team	Car	Time	Gap
1	0	(New Zealand) Dave McMillan	Team McMillan Ford/Citizen Watches/Pan Am/Segedin Speed & Spares	Ralt RT1 / Ford BDA Hart	1:04.1	
2	1	(Finland) Keke Rosberg	Fred Opert Racing	Chevron B39 / Ford BDA Titan	1:04.3	+ 0.2 s
3	3	(Australia) Larry Perkins	Scuderia Veloce	Ralt RT1 / Ford BDA Swindon	1:04.6	+ 0.5 s
4	2	(United States) Bobby Rahal	Fred Opert Racing	Chevron B39 / Ford BDA Morris	1:05.0	+ 0.9 s
5	11	(New Zealand) Ken Smith	La Valise Travel	Chevron B34 / Ford BDA Nicholson	1:05.0	+ 0.9 s
6	4	(United States) Danny Sullivan	March Cars	March 77B / Ford BDA Nicholson	1:05.0	+ 0.9 s
7	9	(New Zealand) Brett Riley	Applied Power	March 77B / Ford BDA Nicholson	1:05.0	+ 0.9 s
8	8	(Australia) Andrew Miedecke	A Miedecke	March 763/76B / Ford BDA Dewhurst	1:05.1	+ 1.0 s
9	10	(Jamaica) Richard Melville	Southplant Tool Hire	March 76B / Ford BDA Hooker	1:05.1	+ 1.0 s
10	19	(New Zealand) Steve Millen	Martini Team Schollum	Chevron B42 / Ford BDA Hart	1:05.4	+ 1.3 s
11	18	(New Zealand) David Oxton	Vacation Hotels	Chevron B34 / Ford BDA Hart	1:05.4	+ 1.3 s
12	22	(New Zealand) Ross Stone	R P Stone	Cuda JR3 / Ford BDA Nicholson	1:06.3	+ 2.2 s
13	17	(New Zealand) Robbie Francevic	Team Typhoon	Modus M3 / Ford BDA Hooker	1:06.3	+ 2.2 s
14	5	(United Kingdom) Ian Grob	Alan Docking Racing	March 763/77B / Ford BDA Swindon	1:07.1	+ 3.0 s
15	7	(Belgium) Pierre Dieudonné	Dr Joe Ehrlich	Ehrlich RP3 / Ford BDA Nicholson	1:07.3	+ 3.2 s
16	16	(New Zealand) Norm Lankshear	Farmers Co-op Fielding	Chevron B34 / Ford BDA Nicholson	1:07.7	+ 3.6 s
17	15	(New Zealand) Eric Morgan	Medley Bourbon/Golden Breed Shirts/Shell	Chevron B29 / Ford BDA BMS	1:07.9	+ 3.8 s
18	99	(New Zealand) Reg Cook	Cook Motor Racing	722 / Ford BDA CMR	1:08.4	+ 4.3 s
19	66	(Australia) Graeme Crawford	Paul England Pty. Ltd	Birrana 273 / Ford BDA England	1:08.8	+ 4.7 s
20		(New Zealand) Dave Saunders	D Saunders	March 722 / Ford BDA	1:09.2	+ 5.1 s

=== Race ===
Pos	No.	Driver	Team	Car	Laps	Time
1	1	(Finland) Keke Rosberg	Fred Opert Racing	Chevron B39 / Ford BDA Titan	30	32min 49.8sec
2	3	(Australia) Larry Perkins	Scuderia Veloce	Ralt RT1 / Ford BDA Swindon	30	+ 1.7 s
3	4	(United States) Danny Sullivan		March 77B / Ford BDA Nicholson	30	+ 18.1 s
4	10	(Jamaica) Richard Melville		March 76B / Ford BDA Hooker	30	+ 18.5 s
5	11	(New Zealand) Ken Smith	La Valise Travel	March 76B / Ford BDA Nicholson	30	+ 38.1 s
6	18	(New Zealand) David Oxton	Vacation Hotels	Chevron B34 / Ford BDA Hart	30	+ 40.0 s
7	22	(New Zealand) Ross Stone		Cuda JR3 / Ford BDA Nicholson	30	
8	17	(New Zealand) Robbie Francevic		Modus M3 / Ford BDA Hooker	30	
9	5	(United Kingdom) Ian Grob	Sphere Drake Racing	March 763/77B / Ford BDA Swindon	30	
10	7	(Belgium) Pierre Dieudonné		Ehrlich RP3 / Ford BDA Nicholson	29	+ 1 Lap
11	19	(New Zealand) Steve Millen	Martini Team Schollum	Chevron B42 / Ford BDA Hart	29	+ 1 Lap
12	16	(New Zealand) Norm Lankshear	FCDC Fielding	Chevron B34 / Ford BDA Hart	29	+ 1 Lap
13	66	(Australia) Graeme Crawford	Paul England Pty. Ltd	Birrana 273 / Ford BDA England	29	+ 1 Lap
14		(New Zealand) Dave Saunders		March 722 / Ford BDA	27	+ 3 Laps
15	0	(New Zealand) Dave McMillan	Team McMillan	Ralt RT1 / Ford BDA Hart	22	+ 8 Laps
Ret	8	(Australia) Andrew Miedecke		March 763/76B / Ford BDA Dewhurst	15	Loose Battery
Ret	2	(United States) Bobby Rahal	Fred Opert Racing	Chevron B39 / Ford BDA Morris	8	Valve
Ret	9	(New Zealand) Brett Riley		March 77B / Ford BDA Nicholson	7	Loose Battery
Ret	15	(New Zealand) Eric Morgan		Chevron B29 / Ford BDA BMS	6	Gear Selector
Ret	99	(New Zealand) Reg Cook		March 742 / Ford BDA CMR	2	Misfire
DNS	17	(New Zealand) Steve Emson		Modus M3 / Ford BDA Nicholson		Did Not Start
DNS	20	(New Zealand) Hugh Owen		Ralt RT1 / Ford BDA Nicholson		Did Not Start
DNS	65	(Australia) Peter Larner	Paul England Pty. Ltd	Dolphin / Ford BDA England		Did Not Start
DNA		(New Zealand) Howard Wood		Lyncar 009 / Ford BDA		Did Not Start

Preceded by 1977 New Zealand Grand Prix	New Zealand Grand Prix; 1978	Succeeded by 1979 New Zealand Grand Prix
