= 1977 New Zealand Grand Prix =

- 23rd New Zealand Grand Prix
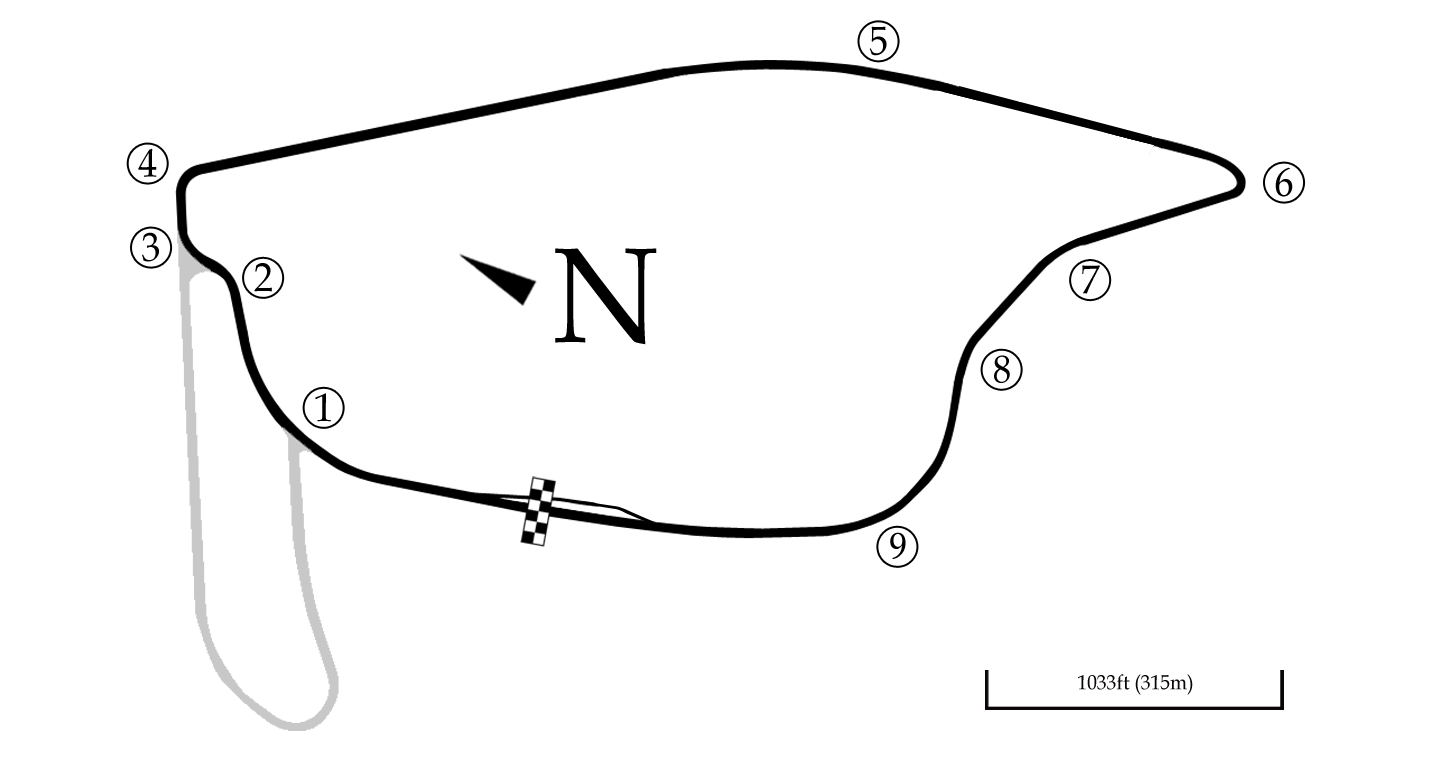

Race details
- Date: 9 January 1977
- Location: Pukekohe Park Raceway, Pukekohe, New Zealand
- Course: Permanent racing facility
- Course length: 2.82 km (1.76 miles)
- Distance: 58 laps, 164 km (102 miles)

Pole position
Driver	(Finland) Mikko Kozarowitzky	Chevron-Ford
- Time: 1:05.5

Podium
First	(Finland) Keke Rosberg	Chevron-Ford
Second	(United States) Tom Gloy	Tui-Ford
Third	(Jamaica) Richard Melville	March-Ford

The 1977 New Zealand Grand Prix was a race held at the Pukekohe Park Raceway on 9 January 1977. The race had 20 starters.

It was the 23rd New Zealand Grand Prix, and saw the race run with Formula Pacific cars rather than Formula 5000 as was run for the previous few years. The race was won by future Formula One World Champion Keke Rosberg in the Chevron B24. The rest of the podium was completed by American Tom Gloy and Jamaican Richard Melville.

== Classification ==
Pos	No.	Driver	Team	Car	Laps	Time
1	4	(Finland) Keke Rosberg	Fred Opert Racing	Chevron B34 / Ford BDA Hart	58	1hr 4min 45.4sec
2	7	(United States) Tom Gloy	Team Tui	Tui BH2 / Ford BDA Nicholson	58	+ 24.7 s
3	10	(Jamaica) Richard Melville	Doug Shierson Racing	March / Ford BDA Swindon	58	+ 53.9 s
4	1	(New Zealand) John Nicholson	Nicholson Racing	Modus M3 / Ford BDA Nicholson	58	+ 55.6 s
5	18	(New Zealand) David Oxton	Oxton Motors	Chevron B29 / Ford BDA	58	+ 1:20.1 s
6	11	(New Zealand) Ken Smith	La Valise Travel	March Engineering 76B / Ford BDA Nicholson	57	+ 1 Lap
7	0	(New Zealand) Dave McMillan	Team McMillan	Ralt RT1 / Ford BDA Hart	57	+ 1 Lap
8	2	(Australia) Andrew Miedecke		Lola T360 / Ford BDA	56	+ 2 Laps
9	14	(New Zealand) Graeme Lawrence	Beng Saswanto	Lola T460 / Ford BDA Swindon	56	+ 2 Laps
10	24	(Hong Kong) Albert Poon		Chevron B34 / Ford BDA Swindon	55	+ 3 Laps
11	23	(New Zealand) Alan Crocker		March 74B / Ford BDA Swindon	55	+ 3 Laps
12	12	(Australia) Ivan Tighe		Elfin 642 / Ford BDA Hart	52	+ 6 Laps
13	15	(New Zealand) Howard Wood	Anderson Racing	March 742 / Ford BDA	50	+ 8 Laps
14	22	(New Zealand) Ross Stone		Cuda JR3 / Ford BDA Nicholson	49	+ 8 Laps
Ret	62	(Australia) Bruce Allison		Ralt RT1 / Ford BDA Hart	39	Gear Selector
Ret	3	(New Zealand) Phil Sharp		Modus M3 / Ford BDA Nicholson	28	Accident
Ret	16	(New Zealand) Peter Hughes		Brabham BT29 / Ford BDA	24	Ignition
Ret	5	(Finland) Mikko Kozarowitzky	Fred Opert Racing	Chevron B34 / Ford BDA Hart	15	Ignition
Ret	17	(New Zealand) Steve Millen	Schollum Bros.	Chevron B35 / Ford BDA Hart	11	Head Gasket
Ret	67	(New Zealand) Graham Baker	Bramwell Scaff	Birrana 274 / Ford BDA	5	Gearbox
DNS	6	(Australia) Enno Buesselman		Elfin 622 / Ford BDA		Did Not Start
DNS	8	(Indonesia) Wolfgang Prejawa		Birrana 274 / Ford BDA		Did Not Start
DNS	19	(New Zealand) Rex Hart		Surtees TS15 / Ford BDA		Did Not Start
DNS	25	(Indonesia) Beng Saswanto		Lola T460 / Ford BDA Swindon		Did Not Start
DNS	9	(New Zealand) Dave Saunders		March 75B / Ford BDA		Did Not Start

Preceded by 1976 New Zealand Grand Prix	New Zealand Grand Prix; 1977	Succeeded by 1978 New Zealand Grand Prix
