= 1989 New Zealand Grand Prix =

- 34th New Zealand Grand Prix
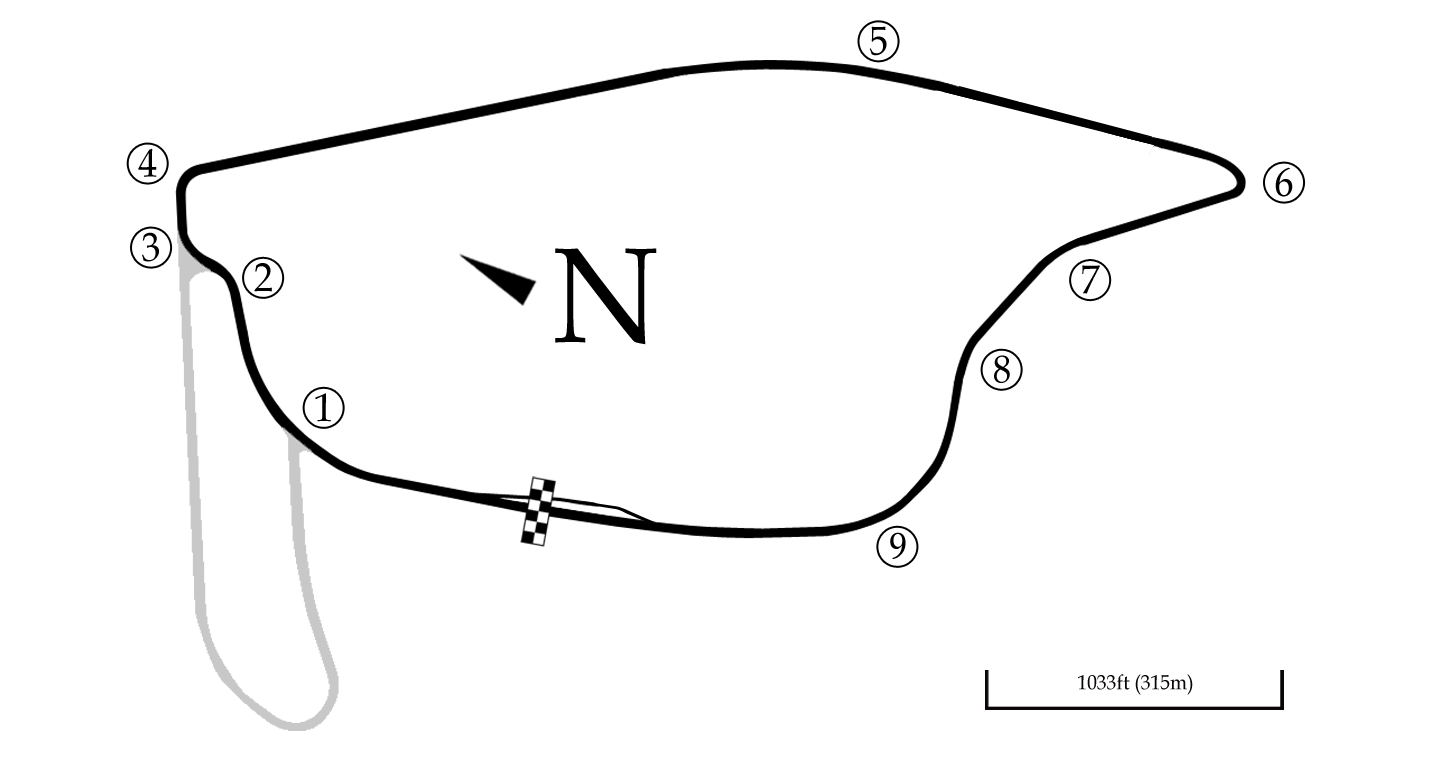

Race details
- Date: 15 January 1989
- Location: Pukekohe Park Raceway, Pukekohe, New Zealand
- Course: Permanent racing facility
- Course length: 2.82 km (1.76 miles)
- Distance: 40 laps, 112.8 km (70.4 miles)

Pole position
| Driver | (United States) Dean Hall | Graeme Lawrence Motorsport |
- Time: 0:57.78

Podium
| First | (United States) Dean Hall | Graeme Lawrence Autosport |
| Second | (Japan) Hiro Matsushita | Team Panasonic |
| Third | (United States) Mark Smith | Graeme Lawrence Autosport |

The 1989 New Zealand Grand Prix was a race held at the Pukekohe Park Raceway on 15 January 1989. It was the 35th running of the New Zealand Grand Prix and served as the second round of the New Zealand Formula Pacific Series.

The race was won by Dean Hall. The podium was completed by Hiro Matsushita and Mark Smith.

== Classification ==
=== Race ===
| Pos | No. | Driver | Entrant | Laps | Time/Retired | Grid |
|---|---|---|---|---|---|---|
| 1 | 4 | (United States) Dean Hall | Graeme Lawrence Autosport | 40 | 39min 17.000sec | 1 |
| 2 | 25 | (Japan) Hiro Matsushita | Team Panasonic | 40 | + 5.24 | 3 |
| 3 | 11 | (United States) Mark Smith | Graeme Lawrence Autosport | 40 | + 12.56 | 4 |
| 4 | 3 | (New Zealand) Craig Baird | Team Caltex | 40 | + 18.92 | 5 |
| 5 | 1 | (New Zealand) Ken Smith | Ken Smith Motorsport | 40 | + 25.41 | 6 |
| 6 | 89 | (New Zealand) Paul Radisich | | 40 | | |
| 7 | | (United States) Stuart Crow | Ralt America | 39 | + 1 lap | |
| 8 | | (New Zealand) Charlie Thomasen | | 39 | + 1 lap | |
| 9 | | (New Zealand) Mike Finch | | 39 | + 1 lap | |
| 10 | | (New Zealand) Ian MacDonald | | 39 | + 1 lap | |
| 11 | | (New Zealand) Steve Richards | | 38 | + 2 laps | |
| 12 | | (New Zealand) Dean Cockerton | | 38 | + 2 laps | |
| 13 | | (New Zealand) Bob Donaldson | | 37 | + 3 laps | |
| 14 | | (New Zealand) Stu Murphy | | 36 | + 4 laps | |
| 15 | | (United States) Scott Gibson | | 36 | + 4 laps | |
| Ret | | (Australia) Bob Creasy | | | Brakes | |
| Ret | | (New Zealand) Richard Lester | | | Electrics | |
| Ret | | (New Zealand) Heather Spurle | | | Engine | |
| Ret | | (New Zealand) Bryan Hartley | | | Gasket | |
| Ret | | (Japan) Kenji Momota | | | Clutch | |

| Preceded by 1988 New Zealand Grand Prix | New Zealand Grand Prix; 1989 | Succeeded by 1990 New Zealand Grand Prix |
