= Pukekohe Park Raceway =

Motorsport track in New Zealand

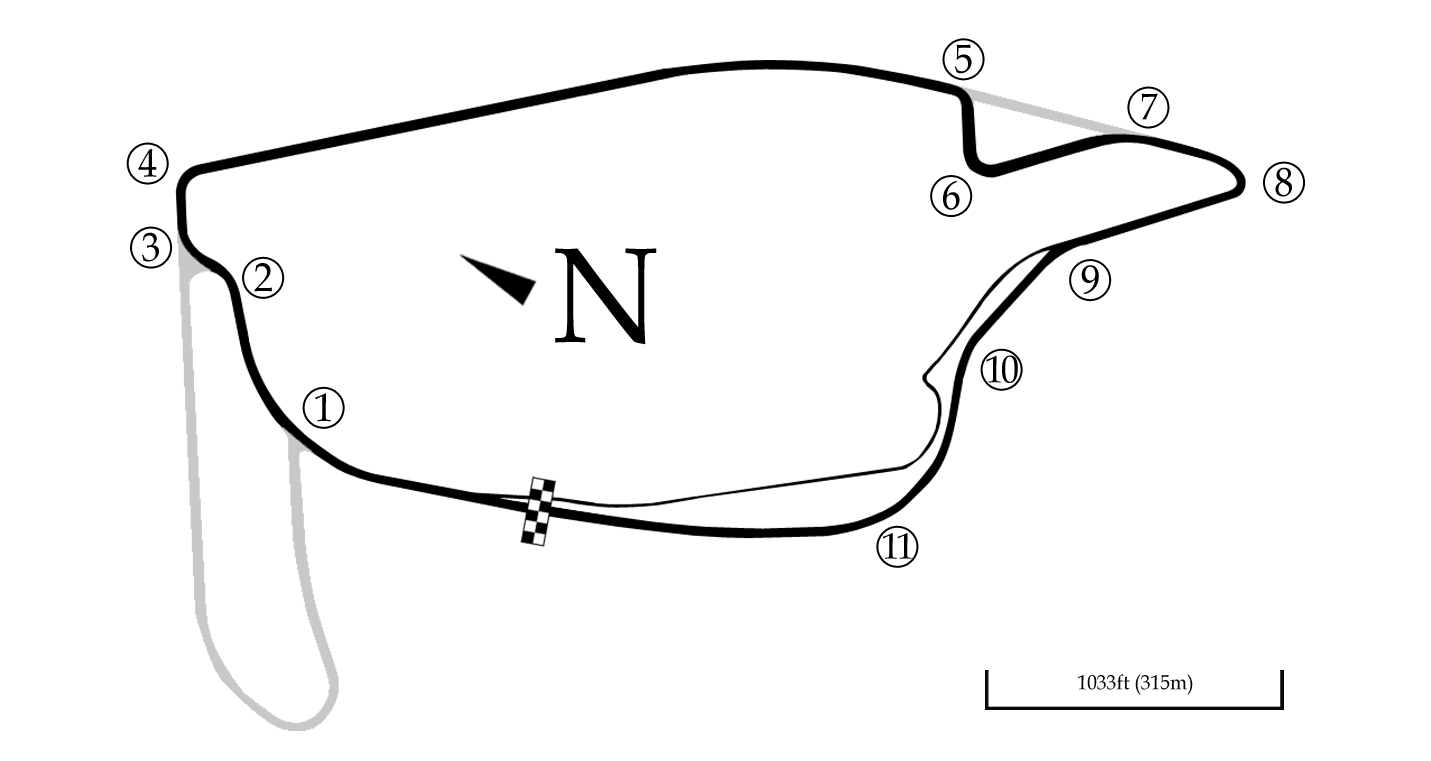
- Grand Prix Circuit (2013–2023)
- Location: Pukekohe, New Zealand
- Coordinates: 37°12′56″S 174°55′8″E
- Owner: Auckland Thoroughbred Racing (1963–2023)
- Opened: 1963; Re-opened for drift: 13 February 2026; 8 months ago
- Closed: 3 April 2023; 3 years ago Re-closed: 15 February 2026; 8 months ago
- Major events: Former: Supercars Championship; Auckland SuperSprint (2001–2007, 2013–2019, 2022); Racer Products V8s (2002–2011, 2013–2020, 2022–2023); Pukekohe 500 (1963–1994, 2012–2014, 2019–2020, 2022); Formula 4 Australian Championship (2018); New Zealand Grand Prix (1963–1973, 1975–1991, 2000); Tasman Series (1974); Toyota 86 Championship (2014–2019, 2021); Toyota Racing Series (2005–2007, 2009, 2020); V8SuperTourer (2012–2015)
- Website: https://www.pukekohepark.co.nz

Grand Prix Circuit (2013–2023)
- Length: 2.910 km (1.808 mi)
- Turns: 11
- Race lap record: 0:59.073 ( (New Zealand) Glenn Smith, Crawford DP03, 2018, DP)

Grand Prix Circuit (1967–2012)
- Length: 2.820 km (1.752 mi)
- Turns: 8
- Race lap record: 0:51.807 ( (New Zealand) Glenn Smith, Crawford DP03, 2018, DP)

Original Circuit (1963–1966)
- Length: 3.540 km (2.200 mi)
- Turns: 7
- Race lap record: 1:25.700 ( (United Kingdom) Graham Hill, BRM P261, 1966, F1)

Pukekohe Park Raceway was a former car racing track that was situated on the outside of the Pukekohe Park Thoroughbred Racetrack, located in the surrounds of Pukekohe.

The Raceway was opened in 1963 as a permanent track, replacing Ardmore Aerodrome as the host circuit of the New Zealand Grand Prix. The car Raceway was designed around the horse racing track that has been hosting thoroughbred races since 1920.

The New Zealand Grand Prix was held at Pukekohe Park Raceway on 29 occasions, the first being in 1963, and the last in 2000.

Pukekohe Park Raceway's Grade 3 licence expired 1 August 2022. The owner of the grounds Auckland Thoroughbred Racing (ATR) announced that it would cease hosting motorsport events on 3 April 2023, citing a desire to focus on its horse racing events and club facilities.

== History ==
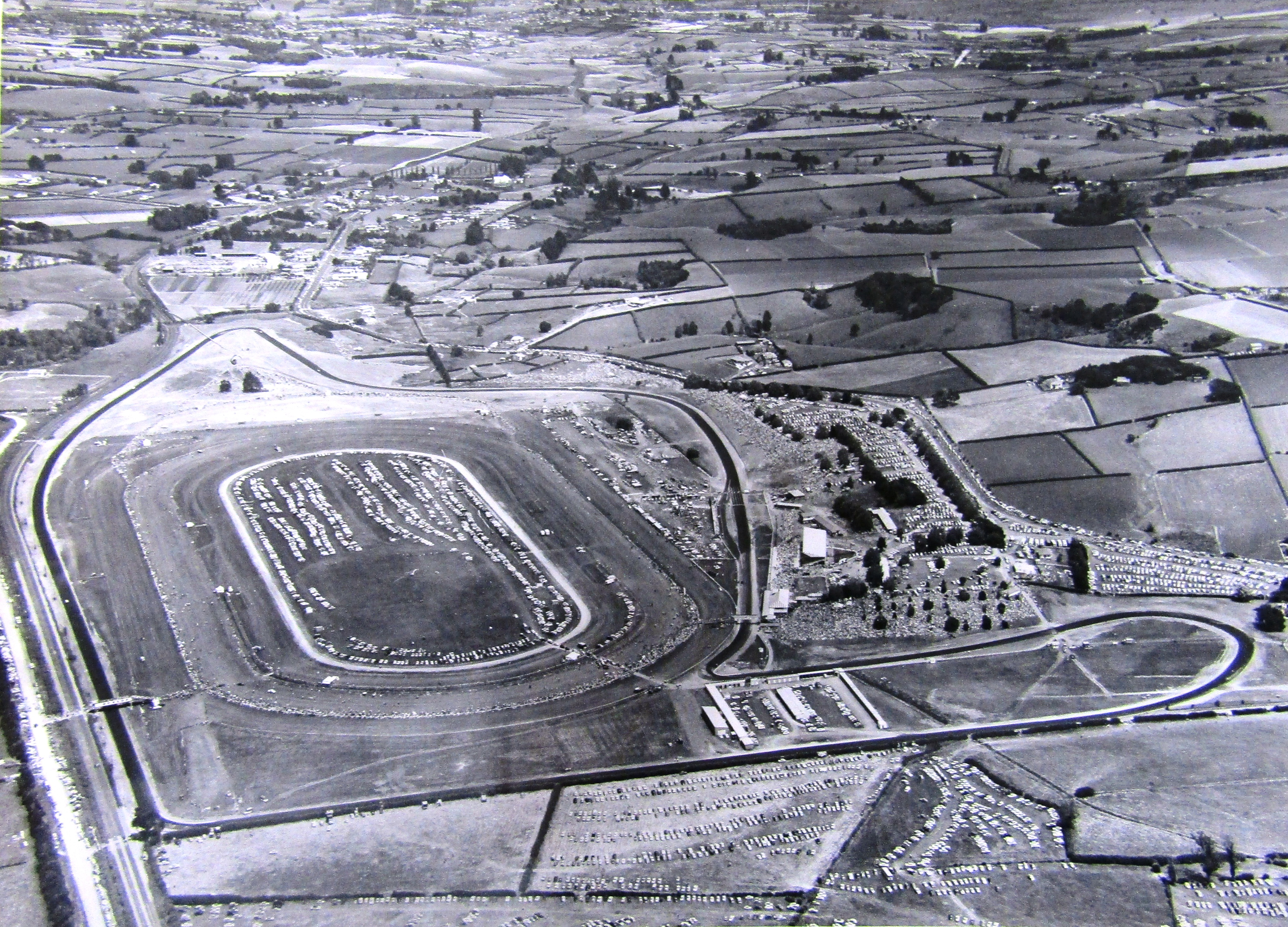
Aerial shot of Pukekohe Park during the 1963 New Zealand Grand Prix meeting

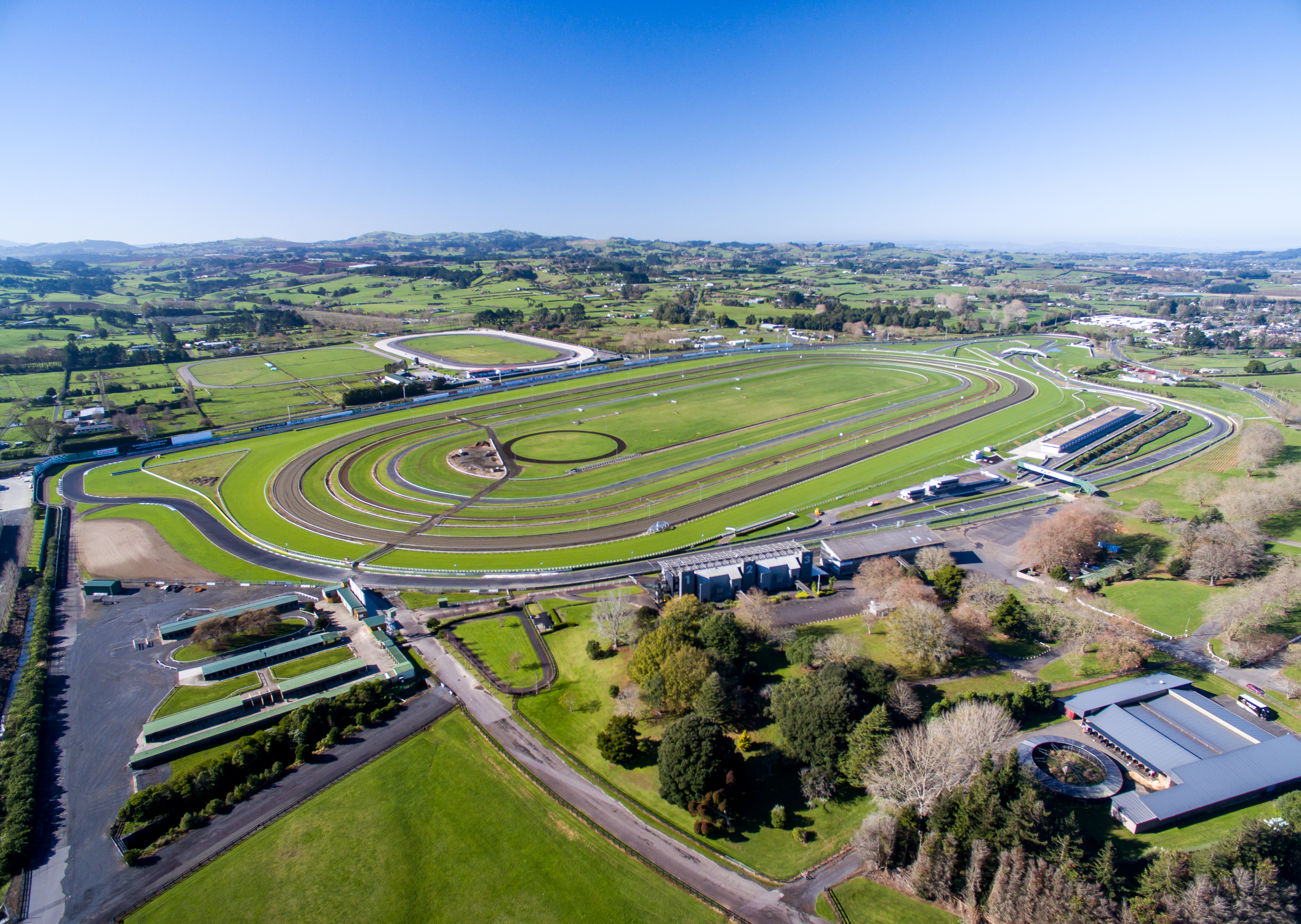
Aerial shot of Pukekohe Park taken in July 2016

The Raceway was opened in 1963 as a permanent track, replacing Ardmore Aedrorome as the host circuit of the New Zealand Grand Prix. Annually for several years, the mainly European based Grand Prix drivers such as Stirling Moss, Graham Hill, Jim Clark and Jackie Stewart, would head downunder for a relaxed Tasman Series during the European winter.

For many years Pukekohe was the venue for New Zealand's premier production car race, the Benson and Hedges 500 mile race (later 1000 km) featuring drivers such as Peter Brock, Dick Johnson and Jim Richards. In 1996 the New Zealand Mobil Sprints held one round in Pukekohe. Pukekohe Park Raceway also held an annual round of the popular Australian V8 Supercar race from 2001 to 2007. However, the New Zealand round moved to Hamilton Street Circuit in 2008. On 5 July 2012, it was announced that V8 Supercars would return to the circuit in 2013 as part of a 5-year deal with the circuit operators following a series of upgrades to accommodate for the series' return.

The changes to the track included a series of corners before the hairpin turn, meaning safer, slower races. The upgrades also included a new race control building, timing building and corporate viewing facility opposite the main grandstand as well as the addition of overhead pedestrian bridges.

In the centre of the circuit there is a thoroughbred racing and training centre, which dictates the use of the site as it owned by Auckland Thoroughbred Racing (ATR). The club is host to 14 horse race meetings a year and is used six days a week as a stables and training facility.

On 20 July 2022, ATR announced that it would cease hosting motorsport events on 3 April 2023, citing a desire to focus on its horse racing events and club facilities. However, in August 2025, it was announced that D1NZ would return there in February 2026, and it would be the last motorsport event in there.

On 8 September 2022, iRacing announced that Pukekohe Park would be laser scanned and digitally preserved for sim racing after an online petition was launched. Over 7,000 digital signatures were collected and the petition gathered support from the "King of Pukekohe" Greg Murphy and three-time Supercars champion Scott McLaughlin, both former Supercars race winners at Pukekohe.

== Layout history ==
Pukekohe Park Raceway Layout History (1963–2023)
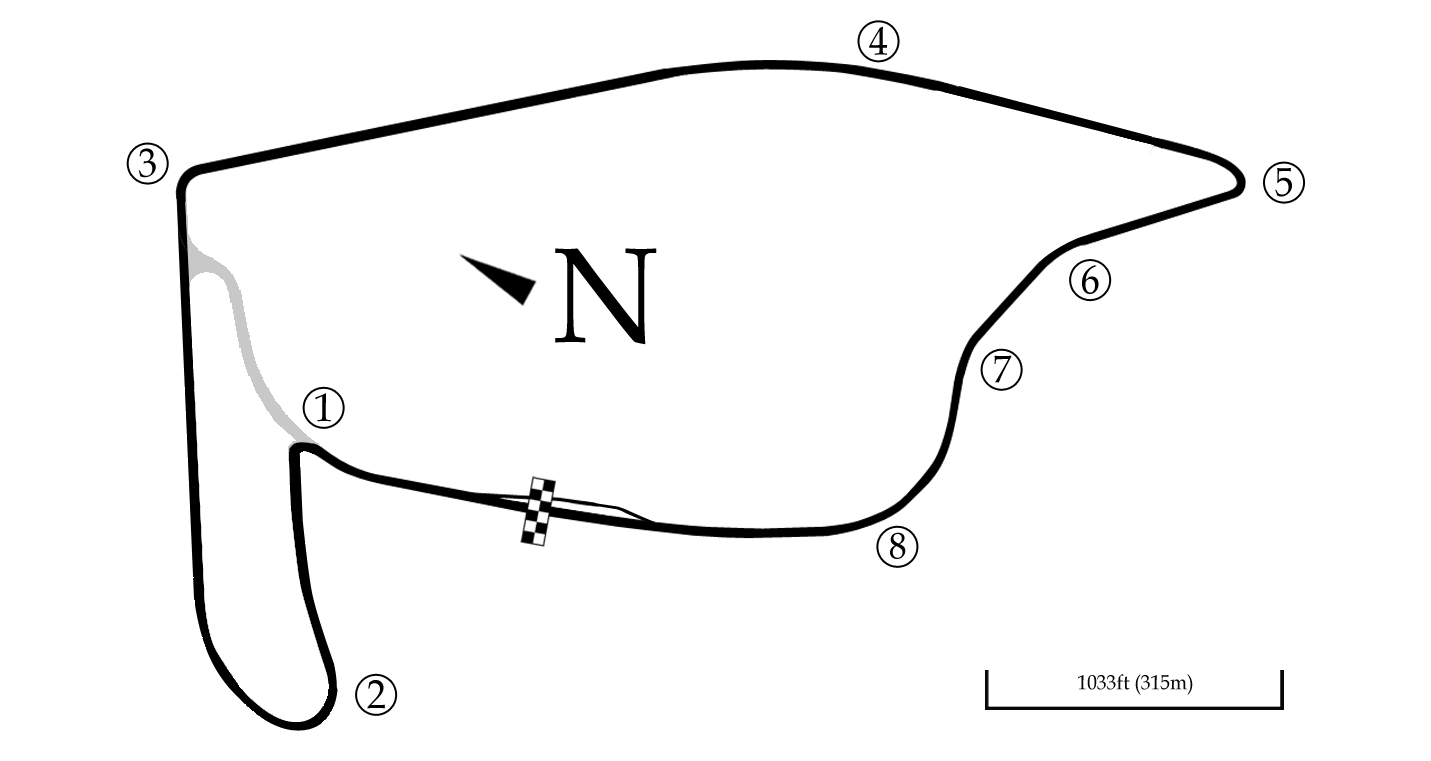
Original Circuit (1963–1966)

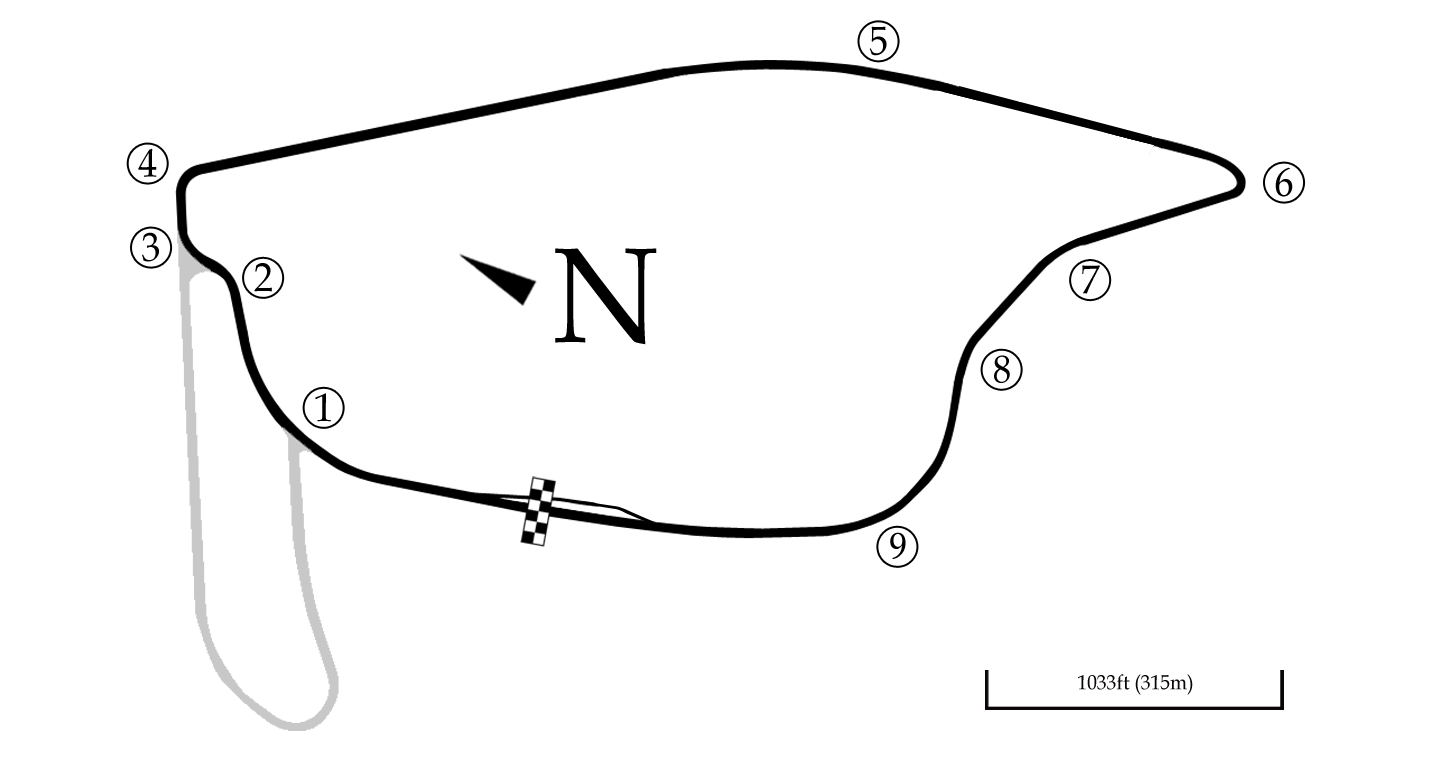
Grand Prix Circuit (1967–1989)

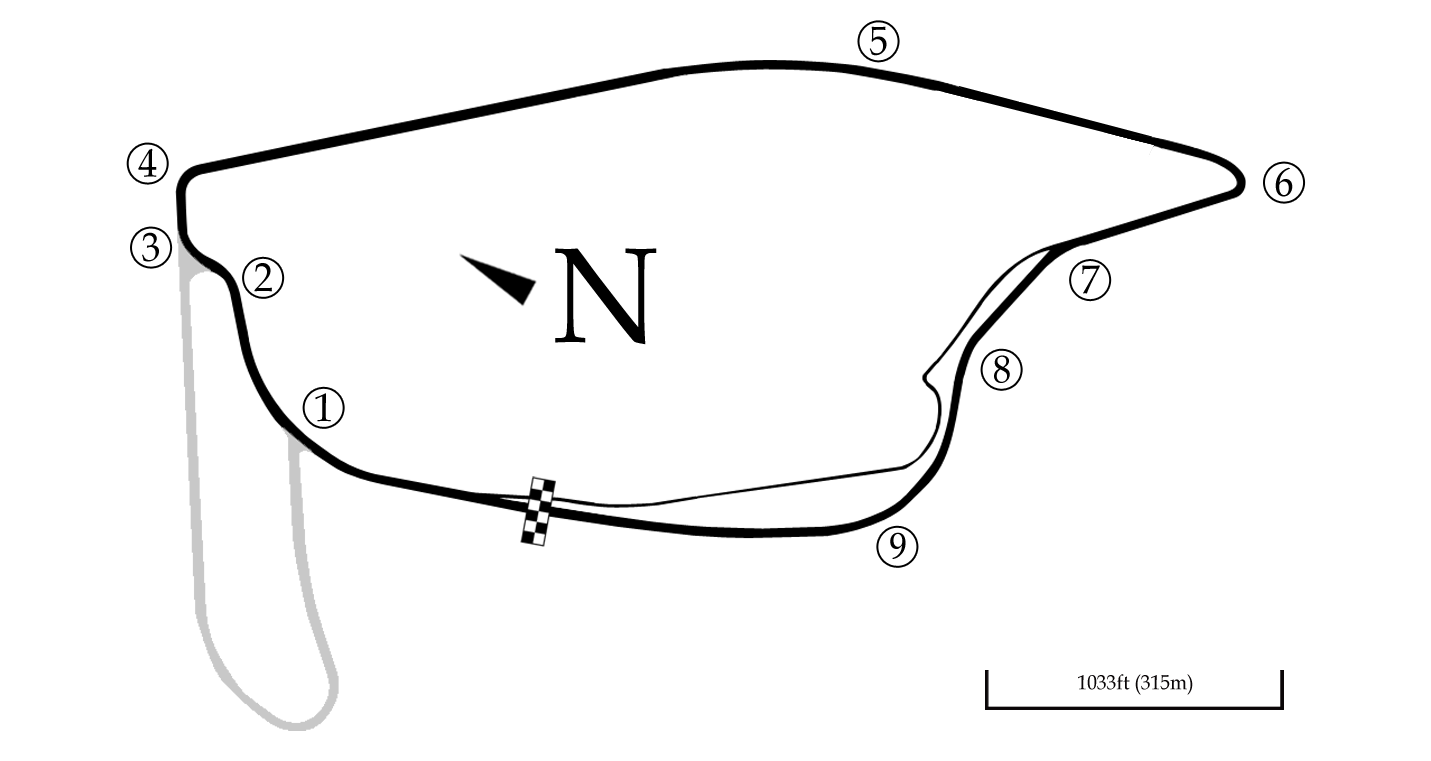
Grand Prix Circuit (1990–2012) (Note: The layout was same, only the pitlane entry was changed.)

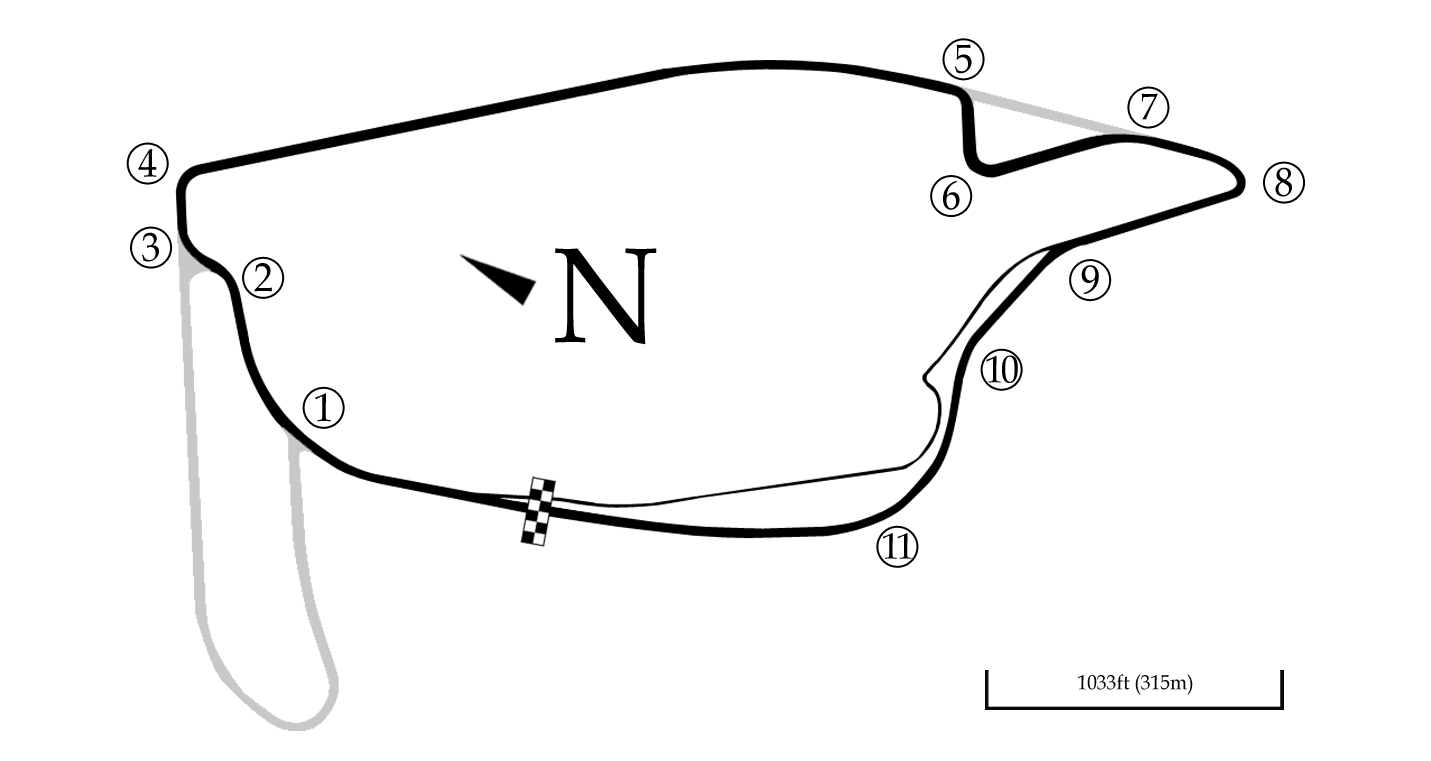
Grand Prix Circuit (2013–2023)

== New Zealand Grand Prix ==
The New Zealand Grand Prix has been held at Pukekohe on 29 occasions, the first being in 1963, and the last to date being held in 2000. Between 1964 and 1975, the NZ Grand Prix at the circuit was also a round of the Tasman Series. Winners of the NZ Grand Prix at Pukekohe include Kiwis Bruce McLaren, Chris Amon, Craig Baird, and Paul Radisich, internationals such as Australian Frank Gardner, Italian Teo Fabi, and Brazilian Roberto Moreno, as well as Formula One World Champions John Surtees, Graham Hill, Jackie Stewart and Keke Rosberg (Rosberg's wins in 1977 and 1978 were before his World Championship win in 1982).

| Year | Driver | Car | Entrant |
|---|---|---|---|
| 1963 | (United Kingdom) John Surtees | Lola Mk4 | Bowmaker-Yeoman Credit Team |
| 1964 | (New Zealand) Bruce McLaren | Cooper T170 | Bruce McLaren Motor Racing |
| 1965 | (United Kingdom) Graham Hill | Brabham BT11A | Scuderia Veloce |
| 1966 | (United Kingdom) Graham Hill | BRM P261 | Owen Racing Organisation |
| 1967 | (United Kingdom) Jackie Stewart | BRM P261 | R.H.H. Parnell |
| 1968 | (New Zealand) Chris Amon | Ferrari 246T | Chris Amon |
| 1969 | (New Zealand) Chris Amon | Ferrari 246T | Scuderia Veloce |
| 1970 | (Australia) Frank Matich | McLaren M10A | Rothmans Team Matich |
| 1971 | (Australia) Niel Allen | McLaren M10A | N.E. Allen Auto Indust. (Pty) Ltd |
| 1972 | (Australia) Frank Gardner | Lola T300 | Lola Cars Ltd |
| 1973 | (Australia) John McCormack | Elfin MR5 | Ansett Team Elfin |
| 1975 | (Australia) Warwick Brown | Lola T332 | BDS Racing |
| 1976 | (New Zealand) Ken Smith | Lola T332 | Ken Smith |
| 1977 | (Finland) Keke Rosberg | Chevron B34 | Fred Opert Racing |
| 1978 | (Finland) Keke Rosberg | Chevron B34 | |
| 1979 | (Italy) Teo Fabi | March 79B | |
| 1980 | (New Zealand) Steve Millen | Ralt RT1 | |
| 1981 | (New Zealand) Dave McMillan | Ralt RT1 | |
| 1982 | (Brazil) Roberto Moreno | Ralt RT4 | Goold Motorsport |
| 1983 | (New Zealand) David Oxton | Ralt RT4 | |
| 1984 | (United States) Davy Jones | Ralt RT4 | |
| 1985 | (United States) Ross Cheever | Ralt RT4 | |
| 1986 | (United States) Ross Cheever | Ralt RT4 | |
| 1987 | (United States) Davy Jones | Ralt RT4 | |
| 1988 | (New Zealand) Paul Radisich | Ralt RT4 | |
| 1989 | (United States) Dean Hall | Swift Cosworth | |
| 1990 | (New Zealand) Ken Smith | Swift Cosworth | |
| 1991 | (New Zealand) Craig Baird | Swift Toyota | |
| 2000 | (New Zealand) Andy Booth | Reynard Reynard 94D | NRC International |

== Supercars Championship ==
View from Ford Mountain during the 2006 V8 Supercars Round

In 2008 the Supercars Championship round in New Zealand moved to the Hamilton Street Circuit so Pukekohe held its final event on the weekend of 20–22 April 2007. In 2013 Supercars returned to Pukekohe after the Auckland government confirmed that stakeholders would put $6.6 million into making the circuit more suitable for Supercars. These upgrades include a new chicane on the back straight, more pedestrian bridges and a makeover of the circuit's appearance.

== Lap records ==
The fastest official race lap records at the Pukekohe Park Raceway are listed as:

| Category | Time | Driver | Vehicle | Date |
Grand Prix Circuit (2013–2023): 2.910 km (1.808 mi)
| DP | 0:59.073 | (New Zealand) Glenn Smith | Crawford DP03 | 1 April 2018 |
| Formula Regional | 0:59.995 | (New Zealand) Liam Lawson | Tatuus FT-60 | 9 February 2020 |
| Supercars | 1:02.3719 | (Australia) Jamie Whincup | Holden ZB Commodore | 15 September 2019 |
| Formula 4 | 1:06.4810 | (Australia) Ryan Suhle | Mygale M14-F4 | 4 November 2018 |
| Toyota 86 Championship | 1:14.970 | (New Zealand) Ash Blewett | Toyota 86 | 8 November 2015 |
Grand Prix Circuit (1967–2012): 2.820 km (1.752 mi)
| DP | 0:51.807 | (New Zealand) Glenn Smith | Crawford DP03 | 9 December 2018 |
| Formula Holden | 0:53.587 | (New Zealand) Matt Halliday | Reynard 95D | 2 December 2000 |
| Formula 5000 | 0:54.980 | (New Zealand) Michael Collins | McRae GM1 | 26 February 2023 |
| Supercars | 0:56.0781 | (New Zealand) Greg Murphy | Holden VZ Commodore | 16 April 2005 |
| Formula One | 0:58.900 | (Austria) Jochen Rindt | Lotus 49T | 4 January 1969 |
| Group A | 0:59.840 | (New Zealand) Jim Richards | Nissan Skyline (BNR32) GT-R | 8 December 1991 |
| Super Touring | 1:02.360 | (New Zealand) Paul Radisich | Ford Mondeo Si | 12 December 1993 |
| Group B | 1:04.340 | (New Zealand) Owen Evans | Porsche Carrera RS | 12 December 1993 |
| Group N | 1:09.070 | (New Zealand) Craig Baird | BMW 325i Coupé | 12 December 1993 |
Original Grand Prix Circuit (1963–1966): 3.540 km (2.200 mi)
| Formula One | 1:25.700 | (United Kingdom) Graham Hill | BRM P261 | 8 January 1966 |
