= 1980 New Zealand Grand Prix =

- 26th New Zealand Grand Prix
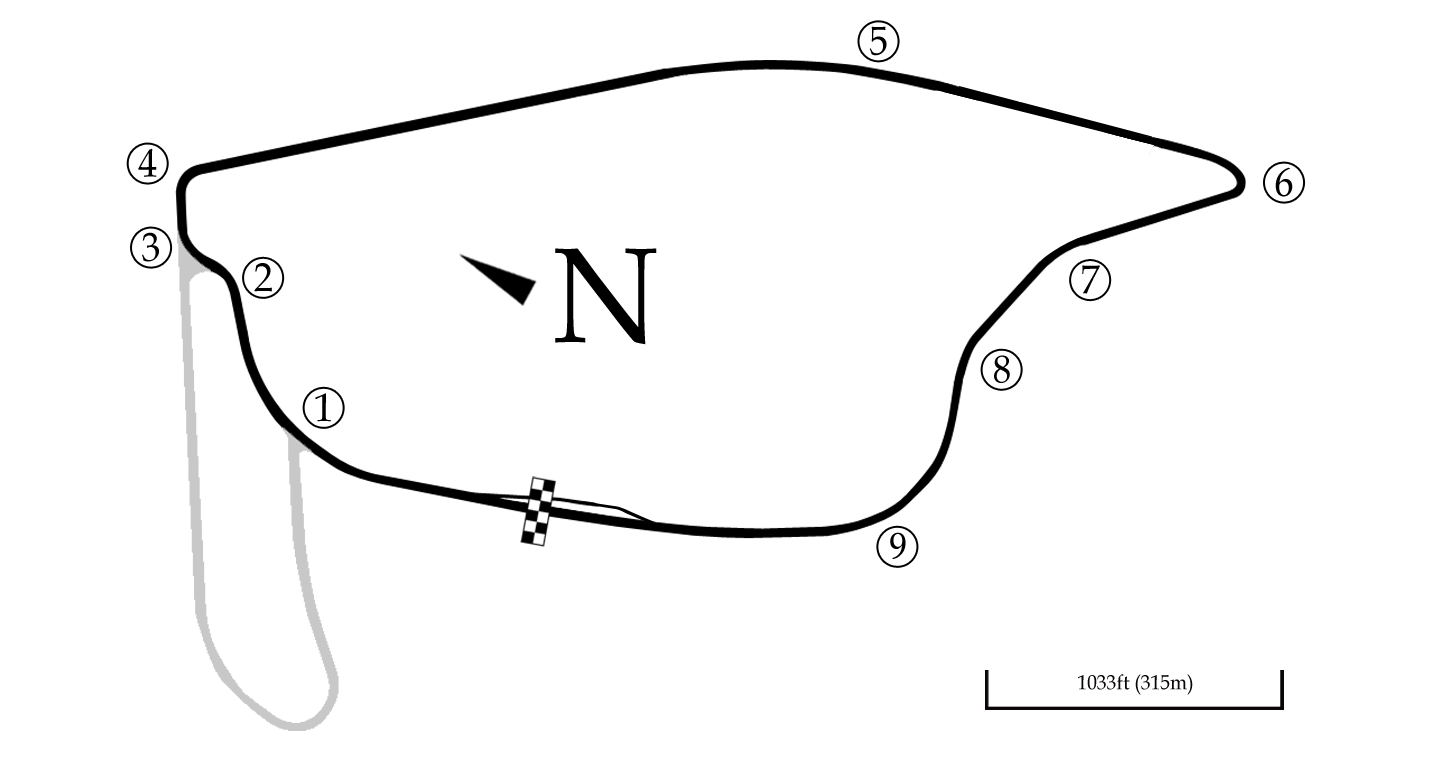

Race details
- Date: 13 January 1980
- Location: Pukekohe Park Raceway, Pukekohe, New Zealand
- Course: Permanent racing facility
- Course length: 2.82 km (1.76 miles)
- Distance: 30 laps, 84.6 km (52.8 miles)

Pole position
Driver	(New Zealand) Steve Millen	Ralt-Ford
- Time: 0.57.8

Podium
First	(New Zealand) Steve Millen	Ralt-Ford
Second	(New Zealand) Dave McMillan	Ralt-Ford
Third	(Italy) Andrea de Cesaris	March-Ford

The 1980 New Zealand Grand Prix was a race held at the Pukekohe Park Raceway on 13 January 1980. The race had 15 competitors.

It was the 26th New Zealand Grand Prix. The race was won by New Zealander Steve Millen for the first time in the Ralt RT1. The rest of the podium was completed by fellow Kiwi Dave McMillan and Italian Andrea de Cesaris.

== Classification ==
=== Qualifying ===
Pos	No.	Driver	Team	Car	Time	Gap
1	7	(New Zealand) Steve Millen	Chardon Schollum Racing	RT1-98 / Ford BDA Masport	0:57.8	
2	1	(New Zealand) Dave McMillan	Citizen Watches/Aurora AFX	Ralt RT1-36 / Ford BDA Hart	0:58.2	+ 0.4 s
3	6	(Australia) John Smith	J Smith	Ralt RT1 / Ford BDA Swindon	0:58.2	+ 0.4 s
4	2	(Italy) Andrea de Cesaris	Marlboro	March 792 / Ford BDA	0:58.4	+ 0.6 s
5	18	(New Zealand) David Oxton	Pye Electronics	Chevron B34 / Ford BDA Hart	0:58.6	+ 0.8 s
6	4	(Australia) Larry Perkins	Paul England Pty Ltd	Chevron B39 / Ford BDA	0:58.8	+ 1.0 s
7	11	(New Zealand) Ken Smith	K Smith	March 782 / Ford BDA	0:59.1	+ 1.3 s
8	8	(Netherlands) Huub Rothengatter	Alan Docking Racing	Chevron B48 / Ford BDA	0:59.2	+ 1.4 s
9	5	(United Kingdom) Ian Flux	J Ehrlich	Ehrlich RP5 / Ford BDA Nicholson	0:59.2	+ 1.4 s
10	9	(South Africa) Desiré Wilson	Nashua/P Coutts & Co Ltd	March 77B / Ford BDA Nicholson	0:59.2	+ 1.4 s
11	3	(New Zealand) Mike Thackwell	Marlboro	March 792 / Ford BDA	0:59.6	+ 1.8 s
12		(New Zealand) Rex Hart	Hawke Motors Ltd	Surtees TS15 / Ford BDA	1:00.5	+ 2.7 s
13		(New Zealand) Grant Campbell	Percy Motors	Chevron B39 / Ford BDA	1:00.6	+ 2.8 s
14	10	(New Zealand) Brett Riley		March 77B / Ford BDA Nicholson	1:00.6	+ 2.8 s
15		(New Zealand) Bob Donaldson	STP	Chevron B42 / Ford BDA Hart	1:03.6	+ 5.8 s

=== Race ===
Pos	No.	Driver	Team	Car	Laps	Time
1	7	(New Zealand) Steve Millen	Schollum Bros	Ralt RT1 / Ford BDA Masport	30	30min 08.9sec
2	1	(New Zealand) Dave McMillan	Team McMillan	Ralt RT1 / Ford BDA Hart	30	+ 12.5 s
3	2	(Italy) Andrea de Cesaris	March Cars - Marlboro	March 792 / Ford BDA	30	+ 19.3 s
4	8	(Netherlands) Huub Rothengatter	Alan Docking Racing	Chevron B48 / Ford BDA	29	+ 1 Lap
5		(New Zealand) Bob Donaldson		Chevron B42 / Ford BDA Hart	28	+ 2 Laps
6		(New Zealand) Grant Campbell	Percy Motors	Chevron B39 / Ford BDA	27	+ 3 Laps
7		(New Zealand) Rex Hart	Hawke Motors Ltd	Surtees TS15 / Ford BDA	27	+ 3 Laps
8	6	(Australia) John Smith	J Smith	Ralt RT1 / Ford BDA Swindon	25	+ 5 Laps
9	10	(New Zealand) Brett Riley		March 77B / Ford BDA Nicholson	24	+ 6 Laps
10	18	(New Zealand) David Oxton		Chevron B34 / Ford BDA Hart	21	+ 9 Laps
11	9	(South Africa) Desiré Wilson		March 77B / Ford BDA Nicholson	19	+ 11 Laps
Ret	11	(New Zealand) Ken Smith		March 782 / Ford BDA	20	Electrics
Ret	4	(Australia) Larry Perkins		Chevron B39 / Ford BDA	13	Fuel Leak
Ret	5	(United Kingdom) Ian Flux		Ehrlich RP5 / Ford BDA Nicholson	2	Electrics
DNS	3	(New Zealand) Mike Thackwell	March Cars - Marlboro	March 792 / Ford BDA		Did Not Start

Preceded by 1979 New Zealand Grand Prix	New Zealand Grand Prix; 1980	Succeeded by 1981 New Zealand Grand Prix
