= 1969 New Zealand Grand Prix =

- Race 1 of 7 in 1969 Tasman Series
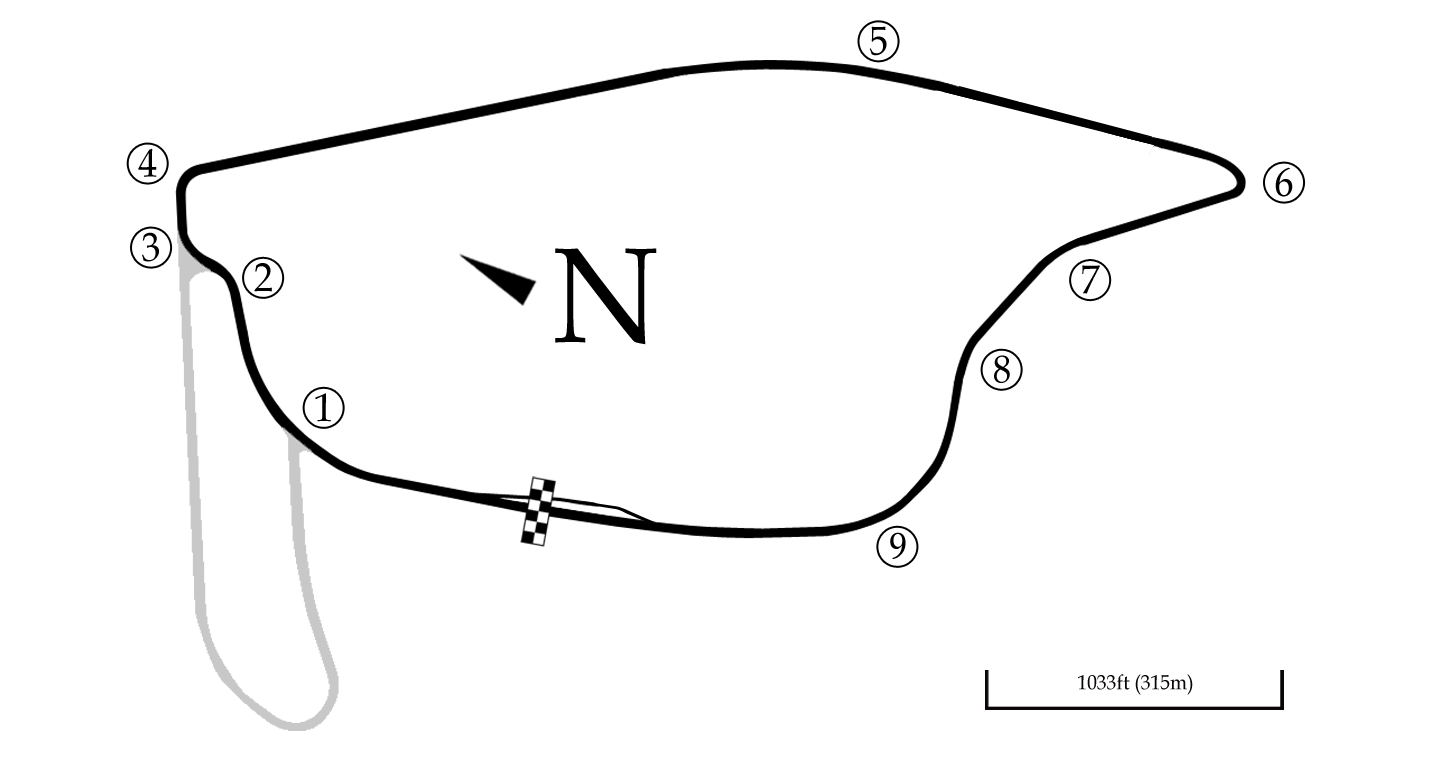

Race details
- Date: 4 January 1969
- Location: Pukekohe Park Raceway, Pukekohe, New Zealand
- Course: Permanent racing facility
- Course length: 2.82 km (1.76 miles)
- Distance: 58 laps, 164 km (102 miles)
- Weather: Sunny

Pole position
Driver	(New Zealand) Chris Amon	Ferrari
- Time: 58.2

Fastest lap
Driver	(Austria) Jochen Rindt	Lotus-Cosworth
- Time: 58.9

Podium
First	(New Zealand) Chris Amon	Ferrari
Second	(Austria) Jochen Rindt	Lotus-Cosworth
Third	(United Kingdom) Piers Courage	Brabham-Cosworth

The 1969 New Zealand Grand Prix was a race held at the Pukekohe Park Raceway on 4 January 1969. The race had 20 starters.

It was the 16th New Zealand Grand Prix, and doubled as the opening round of the 1969 Tasman Series. Chris Amon won his second NZGP, leading home Austrian star Jochen Rindt.

== Classification ==
Results as follows:

Pos	No.	Driver	Team	Car	Laps	Time	Points
1	1	(New Zealand) Chris Amon	SEFAC Ferrari	Dino 246 Tasmania / Ferrari V6 2.4	58	57m 55.4s	9
2	4	(Austria) Jochen Rindt	Team Lotus	Lotus 49B / Cosworth DFW V8 2.5	58	58m 15.5s	6
3	8	(United Kingdom) Piers Courage	Frank Williams Racing	Brabham BT24 / Cosworth DFW V8 2.5	58	58m 46.2s	4
4	2	(United Kingdom) Derek Bell	SEFAC Ferrari	Dino 246 Tasmania / Ferrari V6 2.4	57		3
5	9	(Australia) Leo Geoghegan	Geoghegan Racing	Lotus 39 / Repco V8 2.5	56		2
6	14	(New Zealand) Graeme Lawrence		McLaren M4A / Cosworth FVA 1.6	54		1
7	12	(New Zealand) Roly Levis	Team Lexington	Brabham BT23C / Cosworth FVA 1.6	53		
8	5	(New Zealand) Red Dawson		Brabham BT7a / Climax FPF 2.5	52		
9	18	(New Zealand) David Oxton	Team Lexington	Brabham BT16 / Ford 1.5	52		
10	26	(New Zealand) Frank Radisich	Henderson Central Motors	Lotus 22 / Cosworth FVA 1.6	51		
11	20	(New Zealand) Laurence Brownlie	Team Lexington	Brabham BT23C / Cosworth FVA 1.6	51		
12	43	(New Zealand) Bert Hawthorne	Team Lexington	Brabham BT21 / Ford 1.5	50		
??	17	(New Zealand) Vince Anderson		Brabham BT11A / Climax FPF 2.5			
??	10	(New Zealand) Allan McCully		Brabham BT18 / Ford 1.5			
Ret	36	(New Zealand) Graham McRae		McRae 69 / Ford 1.5	34		
Ret	19	(New Zealand) John Nicholson		Brabham BT18 / Ford 1.5	26		
Ret	6	(Australia) Frank Gardner	Alec Mildren Racing	Mildren Mono / Alfa Romeo V8 2.5	23		
Ret	3	(United Kingdom) Graham Hill	Team Lotus	Lotus 49B / Cosworth DFW V8 2.5	13		
Ret	15	(New Zealand) Dennis Marwood	Rorstan Motor Racing	Brabham BT22 / Climax FPF 2.5	3		
DNS	7	(New Zealand) Peter Moloney		Cooper T66 / Climax FPF 2.5			
DNS	11	(New Zealand) Ken Smith		Lotus 41 / Ford 1.5			
DNS	16	(Australia) Peter Hughes		Lotus 25/33 / Daimler SP250 V8			
DNS	57	(New Zealand) Bryan Faloon	Bryan Faloon Racing	Brabham BT4 / Climax FPF 2.5			
DNS	27	(Australia) Jos Mahon		Lotus 27 / Ford 1.5			
DNS	29	(Australia) Jack Oakley		Brabham BT2 / Ford 1.5			
DNS	41	(New Zealand) Jim Palmer		Rorstan Mk.1 / Climax FPF 2.5			
DNS	61	(New Zealand) Brian Pellow		Brabham BT6 / Fiat 1.5			
DNS	79	(New Zealand) Roy Lyme		Brabham BT6 / Ford 1.5			
DNS	93	(New Zealand) Jim Kennedy		Brabham BT22 / Climax FPF 2.5			

Preceded by 1968 South Pacific Trophy	Tasman Series; 1969	Succeeded by 1969 Levin International
Preceded by 1968 New Zealand Grand Prix	New Zealand Grand Prix; 1969	Succeeded by 1970 New Zealand Grand Prix
