= Chevron B34 =

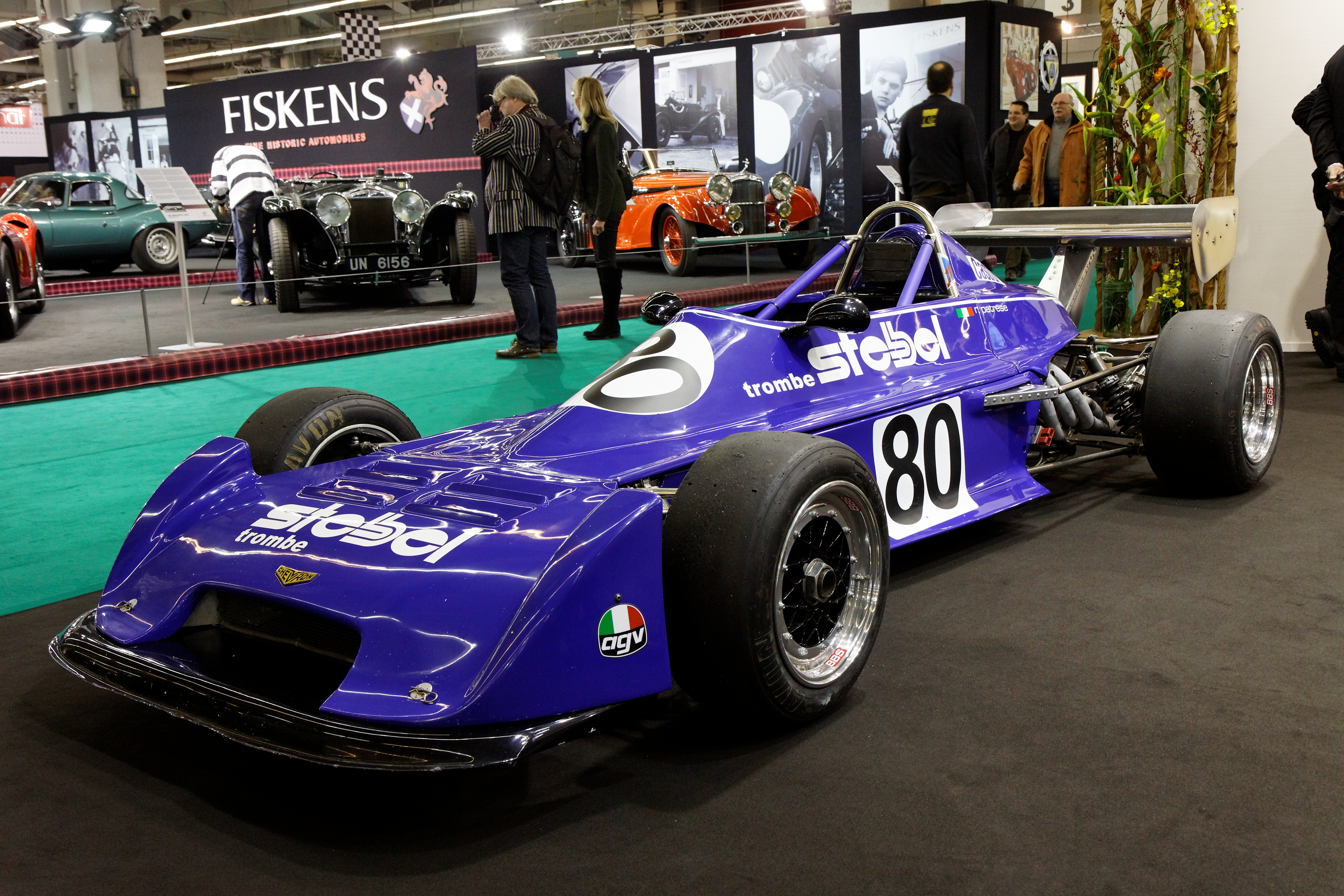
- Designer: Derek Bennett
- Production: 33 units
- Predecessor: Chevron B30
- Successor: Chevron B38

Technical specifications
- Power: 165 hp (123 kW)
- Weight: 450 kg

Competition history

The Chevron B34 was a successful Formula Atlantic and Formula 3 racing car built by Chevron Cars. It was powered by the Toyota/Novamotor PFT 2T-G 2.0 L (120 cu in) inline-four engine; which was good for 165 hp (123 kW).

The B34 was designed in 1975 as a Formula Atlantic racing car, but when the 1976 Formula 3 European Championship was held with more races than in 1975, it was decided in the winter of 1975/1976 to convert the B34 to Formula 3. The first runs with a test car were successful and Derek Bennett consistently developed the racing car further. Unlike the Formula Atlantic car, which was powered by a Hart engine, the Formula 3 car had a Toyota power unit. Chevron built 33 versions of the well-developed B34 chassis. This, in turn, naturally tempted many drivers, most of which achieved great success with the car.

The factory supported the Italian Trivellato team in the European championship and Riccardo Patrese became the European Formula 3 champion with victories in Zandvoort, Enna, Monza, and Kassel-Calden with the B34. Rupert Keegan and Geoff Lees both celebrated victories in the British Formula 3 Championship and the B34 became one of the best-selling Chevron racing cars ever. It was eventually succeeded by the Chevron B38, in 1977.
