= Colin Giltrap =

New Zealand businessman and philanthropist (1940–2024)

Sir Colin Giltrap KNZM
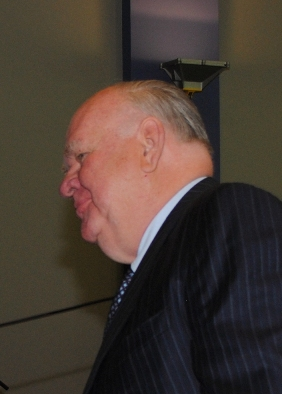
- Giltrap in 2012
- Born: Colin John Giltrap; 29 January 1940
- Died: 17 April 2024 (aged 84); Auckland, New Zealand
- Occupation: Businessman

Sir Colin John Giltrap KNZM (29 January 1940 – 17 April 2024) was the founder of Giltrap Group, one of New Zealand’s largest automotive dealership and distribution groups, and a prominent supporter of domestic and international motorsport.

In the 2012 New Year Honours, he was appointed a Knight Companion of the New Zealand Order of Merit, for services to motorsport and philanthropy. He was inducted into the New Zealand Business Hall of Fame in 2013.

Giltrap was born on 29 January 1940. He died on 17 April 2024, at the age of 84.

== Sir Colin Giltrap Raceway ==
In December 2025, the Colin Dale Park Kartsport Development Charitable Trust announced that Colin Dale Raceway had been renamed Sir Colin Giltrap Raceway in honour of Sir Colin Giltrap. The renaming recognised Giltrap’s long-standing contributions to motorsport in New Zealand and his support of karting development.

Located at Colin Dale Park in Wiri, Auckland, Sir Colin Giltrap Raceway operates as a karting facility used for competition, driver development, and community motorsport activities.
