= Josh Price =

British racing driver (born 1998)

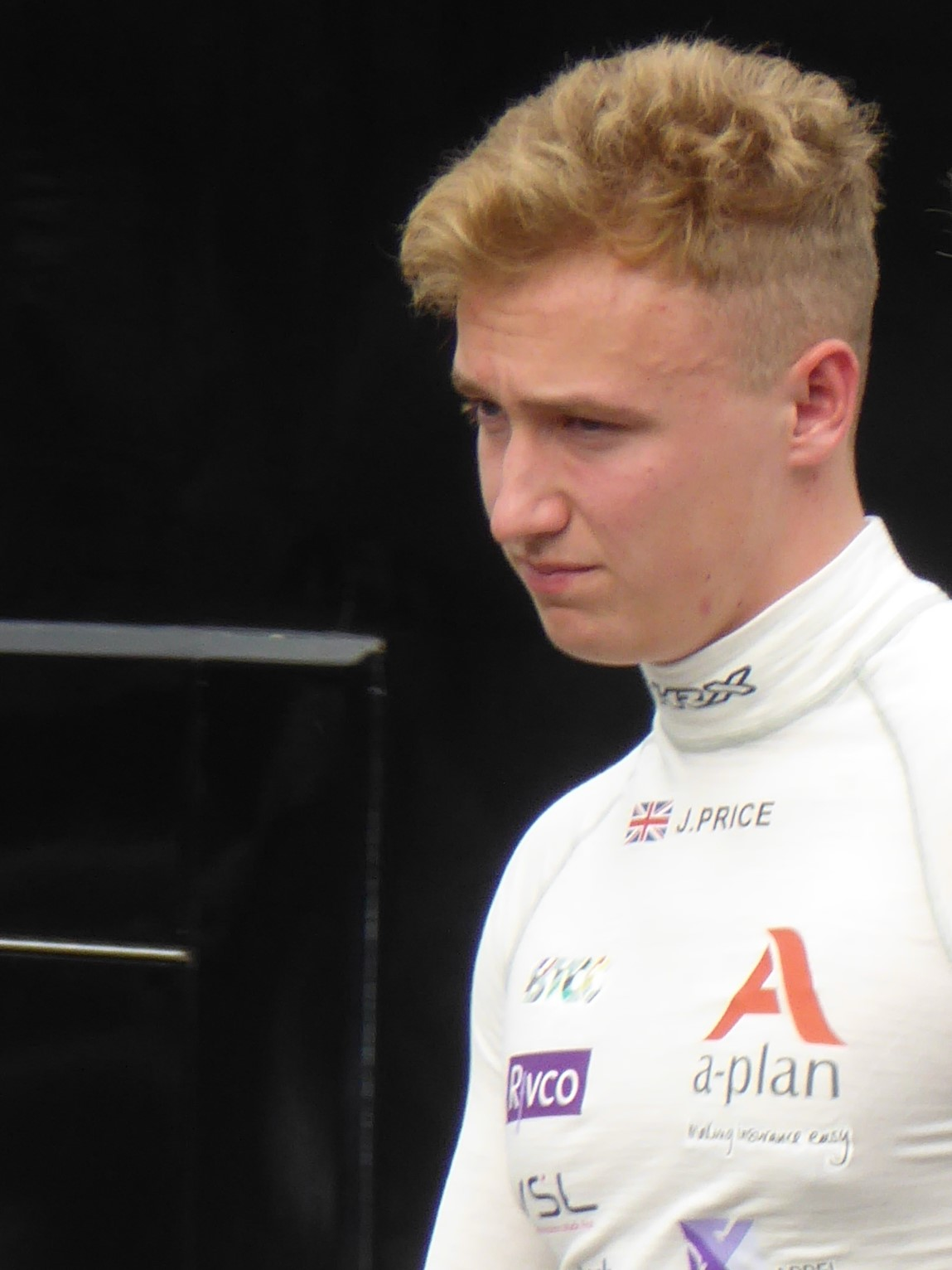
- Price at Knockhill in 2017
- Nationality: (United Kingdom) British
- Born: Josh Charlie Ronnie Price; 19 December 1998 (age 27) Hemel Hempstead, Hertfordshire

British Touring Car Championship career
- Debut season: 2024
- Current team: EXCELR8 Motorsport
- Categorisation: FIA Silver

Previous series
- 2019 2016–2018 2015–16: British GT Championship; British Touring Car Championship; Renault Clio Cup UK

Josh Charlie Ronnie Price (born 19 December 1998) is a British racing driver who last competed in the Mini Challenge UK for EXCELR8 Motorsport.

== Racing career ==
=== Early career ===
Price began his car racing career in 2015, joining the Renault UK Clio Cup with Team Pyro for six races. He remained with the team for the full season for 2016, eventually finishing sixth in points after taking his first win in the final race.

=== British Touring Car Championship ===
Price initially resigned for another season of the Clio Cup with Team Pyro, this time as part of Team BMR's academy. However, at the BTCC Media Day on 16 March, Price was announced as Team BMR's fourth BTCC driver running one of their Subaru Levorgs. His teammates were Jason Plato, Ashley Sutton and James Cole.

=== British GT Championship ===
Price was partnered with Patrick Kibble and drove for the TF Sport team run by ex-BTCC driver Tom Ferrier. Price and Kibble only had three points-scoring races, one of which was a third place finish at Spa-Francorchamps.

== Racing record ==
=== Complete British Touring Car Championship results ===
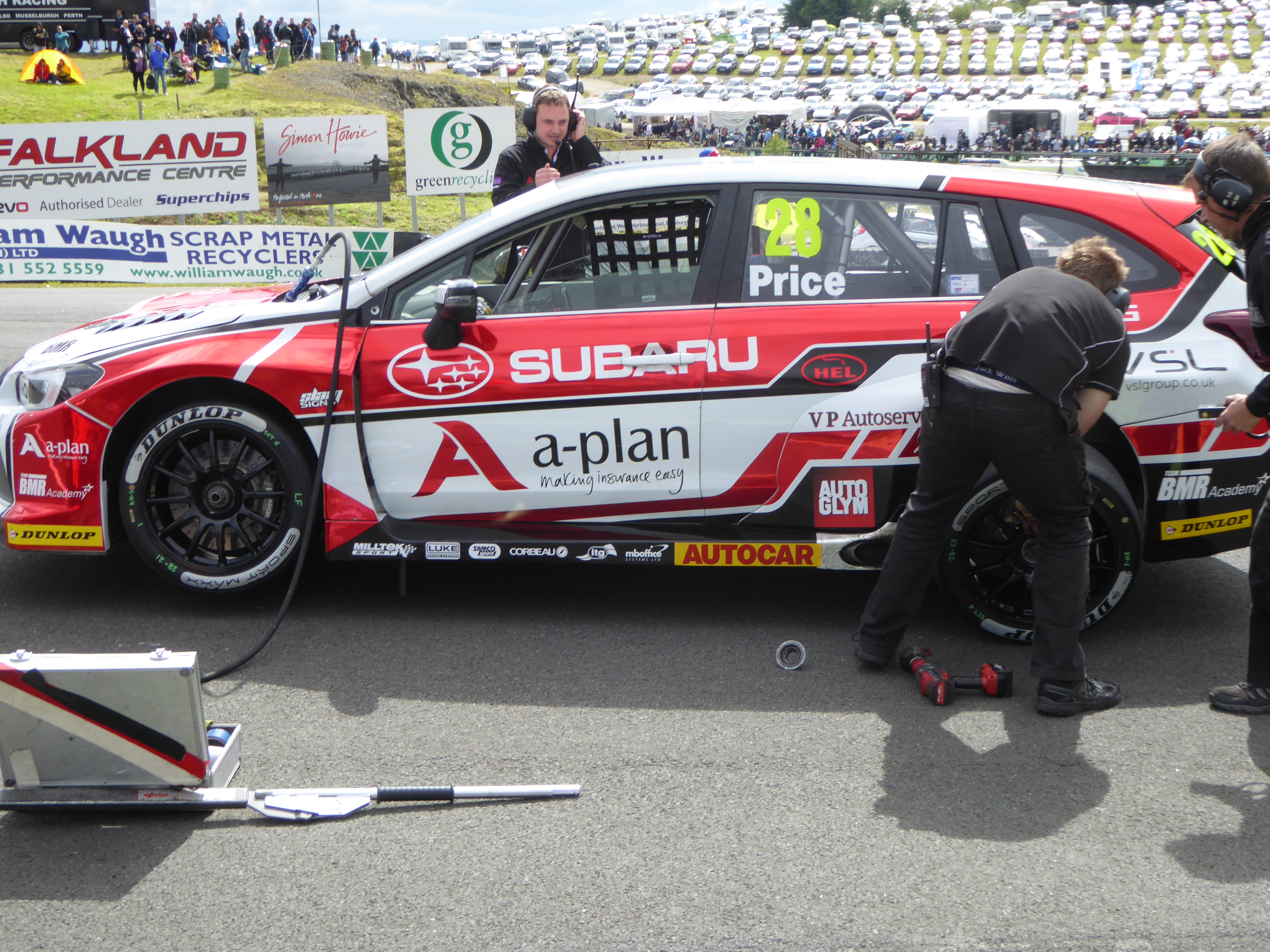
Price, at the Knockhill round of the 2017 British Touring Car Championship.

(key) (Races in bold indicate pole position – 1 point awarded just in first race; races in italics indicate fastest lap – 1 point awarded all races; * signifies that driver led race for at least one lap – 1 point given all races)

Year	Team	Car	1	2	3	4	5	6	7	8	9	10	11	12	13	14	15	16	17	18	19	20	21	22	23	24	25	26	27	28	29	30	DC	Pts
2017	BMR Racing Academy	Subaru Levorg GT	BRH; 1; 24	BRH; 2; 24	BRH; 3; 24	DON; 1; 21	DON; 2; 28	DON; 3; 23	THR; 1; 29	THR; 2; 26	THR; 3; 24	OUL; 1; 22	OUL; 2; 15	OUL; 3; 27	CRO; 1 Ret	CRO; 2; 24	CRO; 3 Ret																31st	9
2017	A-Plan Academy	Subaru Levorg GT																SNE; 1 Ret	SNE; 2; 26	SNE; 3; 19	KNO; 1; 18	KNO; 2 DSQ	KNO; 3 Ret	ROC; 1; 9	ROC; 2 Ret	ROC; 3 Ret	SIL; 1; 21	SIL; 2; 16	SIL; 3 Ret	BRH; 1; 22	BRH; 2; 23	BRH; 3 Ret	31st	9
2018	Autoglym Academy Racing	Subaru Levorg GT	BRH; 1; 23	BRH; 2; 23	BRH; 3; 28	DON; 1; 26	DON; 2; 26	DON; 3 Ret	THR; 1; 22	THR; 2; 23	THR; 3 Ret	OUL; 1 Ret	OUL; 2; 24	OUL; 3 Ret	CRO; 1; 18	CRO; 2 Ret	CRO; 3; 24	SNE; 1	SNE; 2	SNE; 3	ROC; 1	ROC; 2	ROC; 3	KNO; 1	KNO; 2	KNO; 3	SIL; 1	SIL; 2	SIL; 3	BRH; 1	BRH; 2	BRH; 3	35th	0

=== Complete British GT Championship results ===
(key) (Races in bold indicate pole position) (Races in italics indicate fastest lap)

Year	Team	Car	Class	1	2	3	4	5	6	7	8	9	DC	Points
2019	TF Sport	Aston Martin Vantage GT4	GT4	OUL; 1; 16	OUL; 2; 29	SNE; 1; 22	SNE; 2; 24	**SIL**; **1**; 24	DON; 1; 34	SPA; 1; 16	BRH; 1 Ret	DON; 1; 17	12th	44.5
