= Luke Davenport =

British former racing driver (born 1993)

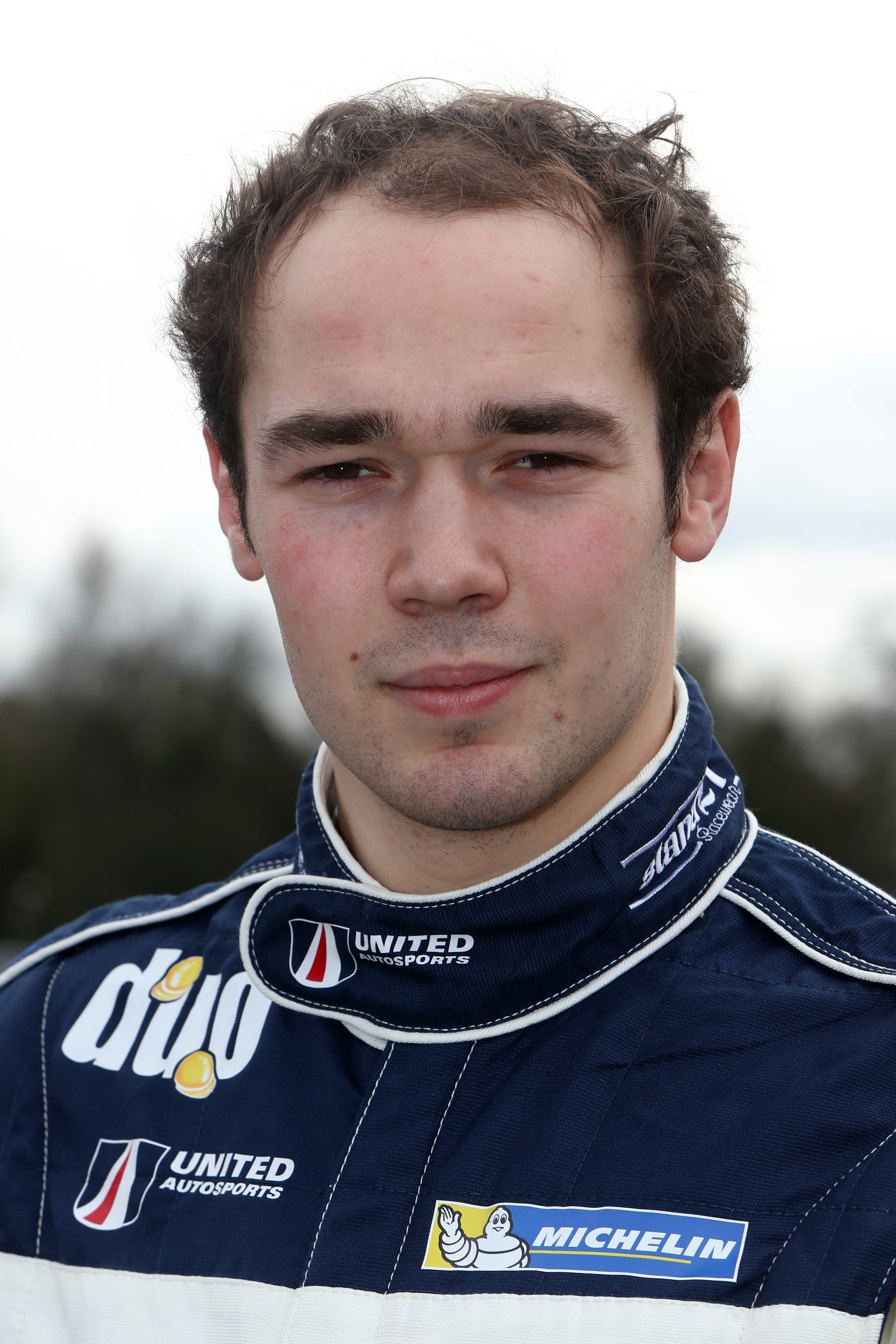
- Davenport in 2014
- Nationality: British
- Born: Luke Edward Davenport; 29 May 1993 (age 33) Cambridge, Cambridgeshire, England

British Touring Car Championship career
- Debut season: 2017
- Current team: Motorbase Performance
- Categorisation: FIA Silver
- Car number: 300
- Starts: 12
- Wins: 0
- Poles: 0
- Fastest laps: 0

Previous series
- 2015–16 2014 2011–13: British GT Championship; Ginetta GT4 Supercup; Ginetta Challenge

Luke Edward Davenport (born 29 May 1993) is a British former racing driver who last competed in the British Touring Car Championship for Motorbase Performance in 2017. He retired from racing after a big impact at Croft, in which he suffered life-threatening injuries.

== Racing career ==
=== Early career ===
Davenport began his car racing career in 2011, competing in the Ginetta Challenge. Starting in the G20 class, he moved up to the G40 class in 2012 where he remained for the next two seasons culminating in him finishing fourth in the championship in 2013 with one win. In 2014, Davenport moved to the Ginetta GT4 Supercup on the TOCA BTCC support package. He competed for United Autosports with veteran Carl Breeze as his teammate. He finished the season sixth in points with two wins.

Davenport spent the next two seasons in the British GT driving for Tolman Motorsport.

=== British Touring Car Championship ===
For the 2017 season, Davenport was signed by Motorbase Performance to compete in the British Touring Car Championship. His teammates were Mat Jackson and Martin Depper. Davenport's stint in the BTCC concluded following a heavy crash in the rain at Croft in June, with Davenport suffering from multiple injuries including chest injuries, lung damage, broken right leg, broken pelvis, broken right arm and concussion.

=== Britcar Endurance Championship ===
Davenport is participating in the 2020 season of the Britcar Endurance Championship in a Ligier JS2 R for Reflex Racing with Marcus Vivian. Davenport and Vivian were announced in January 2021 to be again competing with each other in the Ligier for 2021.

== Racing record ==
=== Complete British Touring Car Championship results ===
(key) (Races in bold indicate pole position – 1 point awarded just in first race; races in italics indicate fastest lap – 1 point awarded all races; * signifies that driver led race for at least one lap – 1 point given all races)

Year	Team	Car	1	2	3	4	5	6	7	8	9	10	11	12	13	14	15	16	17	18	19	20	21	22	23	24	25	26	27	28	29	30	DC	Pts
2017	Team Shredded Wheat Racing with Duo	Ford Focus ST	BRH; 1; 19	BRH; 2 Ret	BRH; 3; 20	DON; 1 DSQ	DON; 2; 16	DON; 3; 25	THR; 1; 17	THR; 2; 17	THR; 3 Ret	OUL; 1; 18	OUL; 2; 17	OUL; 3; 10	CRO; 1 WD	CRO; 2 WD	CRO; 3 WD	SNE; 1	SNE; 2	SNE; 3	KNO; 1	KNO; 2	KNO; 3	ROC; 1	ROC; 2	ROC; 3	SIL; 1	SIL; 2	SIL; 3	BRH; 1	BRH; 2	BRH; 3	32nd	6

=== Complete Britcar results ===
(key) (Races in bold indicate pole position in class – 1 point awarded just in first race; races in italics indicate fastest lap in class – 1 point awarded all races;-

Year	Team	Car	Class	1	2	3	4	5	6	7	8	9	10	11	12	13	DC	CP	Points
2020	Reflex Racing	Ligier JS2 R	4	CRO; 1	CRO; 2	BRH; 1; 10	BRH; 2; 7	OUL; 1; 6	SIL; 1; 10	SIL; 2; 5	SNE; 1; 10	SNE; 2; 10					5th	1st	188
2021	Reflex Racing	Ligier JS2 R	4	SIL; 1 Ret	SIL; 2 DNS	SNE; 1	SNE; 2	OUL; 1	OUL; 2	SIL; 1	BRH; 1	BRH; 1	DON; 1	DON; 2	BRH; 1	BRH; 1	29th	16th	1
