= Team BMR =

British motor racing team

(United Kingdom) Team BMR
- Founded: 2013
- Team principal(s): Warren Scott
- Former series: British Superbike Championship; British Touring Car Championship; Renault Clio Cup United Kingdom; Ginetta Junior Championship
- Noted drivers: (United Kingdom) Ashley Sutton (United Kingdom) Colin Turkington (United Kingdom) Jason Plato (United Kingdom) Senna Proctor (Switzerland) Alain Menu (Republic of Ireland) Árón Taylor-Smith
- Teams' Championships: 2015
- Website: http://www.teambmr.co.uk

Team BMR, formerly under the moniker CHROME Edition Restart Racing, was a British motor racing team based in Buntingford, Hertfordshire and founded by Warren Scott. The team raced in the British Touring Car Championship between 2013 and 2019 after previously entering the 2004 British Superbike Championship season as BMR Racing. During the winter of 2013, Scott purchased Tony Gilham Racing's assets, including their four NGTC race cars.

== British Superbike Championship ==
The team's roots can be traced back to team owner Warren Scott's superbike racing days. Scott entered the 2004 British Superbike Championship season in the Privateers Cup class, riding a Kawasaki Ninja ZX-10R superbike, under the team name BMR Racing, along with teammate Chris Platt who entered two events as a replacement rider.

== British Touring Car Championship ==
=== SEAT Leon and Volkswagen CC (2013) ===
Team BMR entered the BTCC in 2013, running a Super 2000 SEAT León for team owner Warren Scott in the Jack Sears Trophy class. His best result with the León was a 15th place, scoring the team's only point of the season.

When the second half of the season began at Snetterton, after the summer break, the team switched to an NGTC Volkswagen CC built by and run with the support of Tony Gilham Racing, as preparation for a full NGTC campaign in 2014.

=== Volkswagen CC and Vauxhall Insignia (2014) ===
Before the start of the 2014 British Touring Car Championship season, Tony Gilham Racing merged into Team BMR, allowing the team to acquire a pair of Volkswagen CCs and a pair of Vauxhall Insignias, originally built by Thorney Motorsport. Jack Goff was confirmed as their first driver, racing under the RCIB Insurance Racing banner in the first Insignia, with Warren Scott driving the second. 1997 and 2000 champion Alain Menu returned to the series with the team, driving one of the team's Volkswagens alongside former Motorbase driver Árón Smith. Smith became the team's stand out driver in 2014, scoring the team's maiden win during the fourth round at Oulton Park and following this up with a second win at Snetterton. He also managed to score two fastest laps at Croft and Rockingham. On his return to the championship, Menu managed to score two podiums in the latter half of the season at Rockingham and Silverstone, whilst Goff and Scott struggled during the first half of the season in the older, less developed Insignias. This led to the team building another pair of Volkswagen CCs for Goff and Scott to race after the season's halfway point at Snetterton. The team's success continued to grow during the rest of the season; the team made BTCC history in race 3 at Silverstone, by becoming the first team to achieve a top ten finish with four cars in the same race.

=== Volkswagen CC (2015) ===
Prior to the start of the 2015 British Touring Car Championship season, the team announced that they would enter the season with the four Volkswagen CCs the team used towards the end of the 2014 campaign. Both Warren Scott and Árón Smith remained with the team, with double champions Jason Plato and Colin Turkington joining them from MG and West Surrey Racing respectively.

=== Subaru Levorg (2016–2019) ===
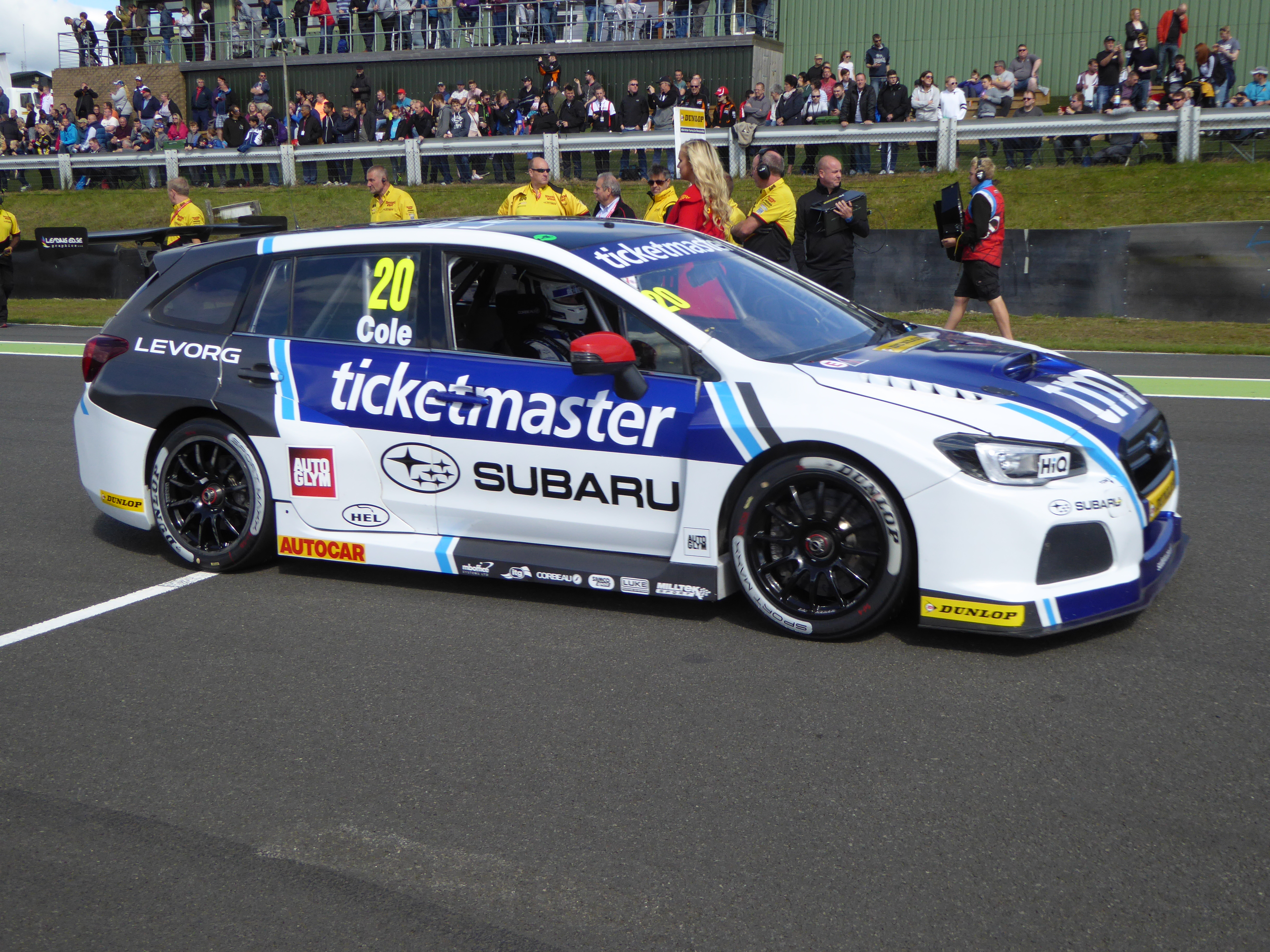
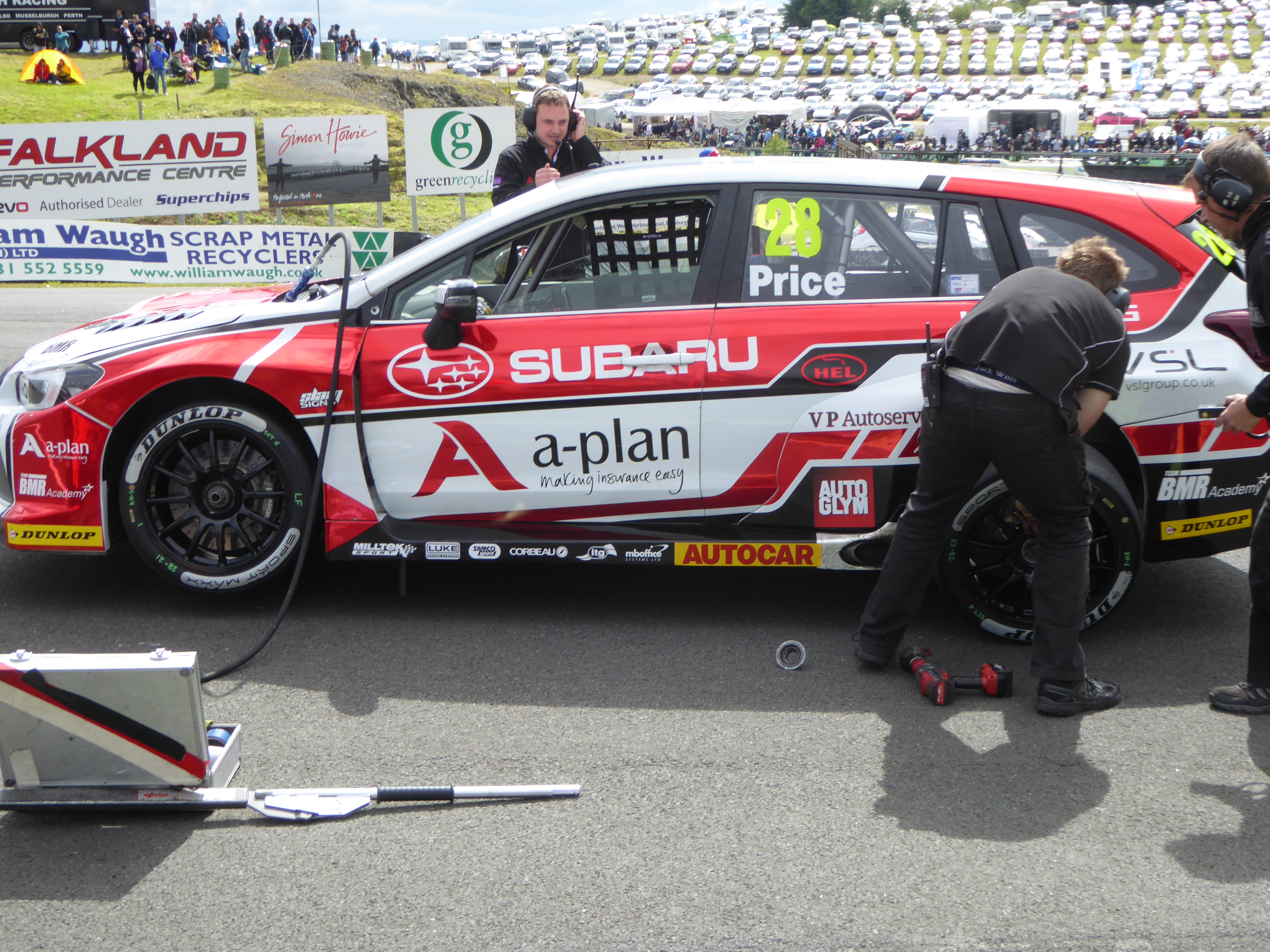
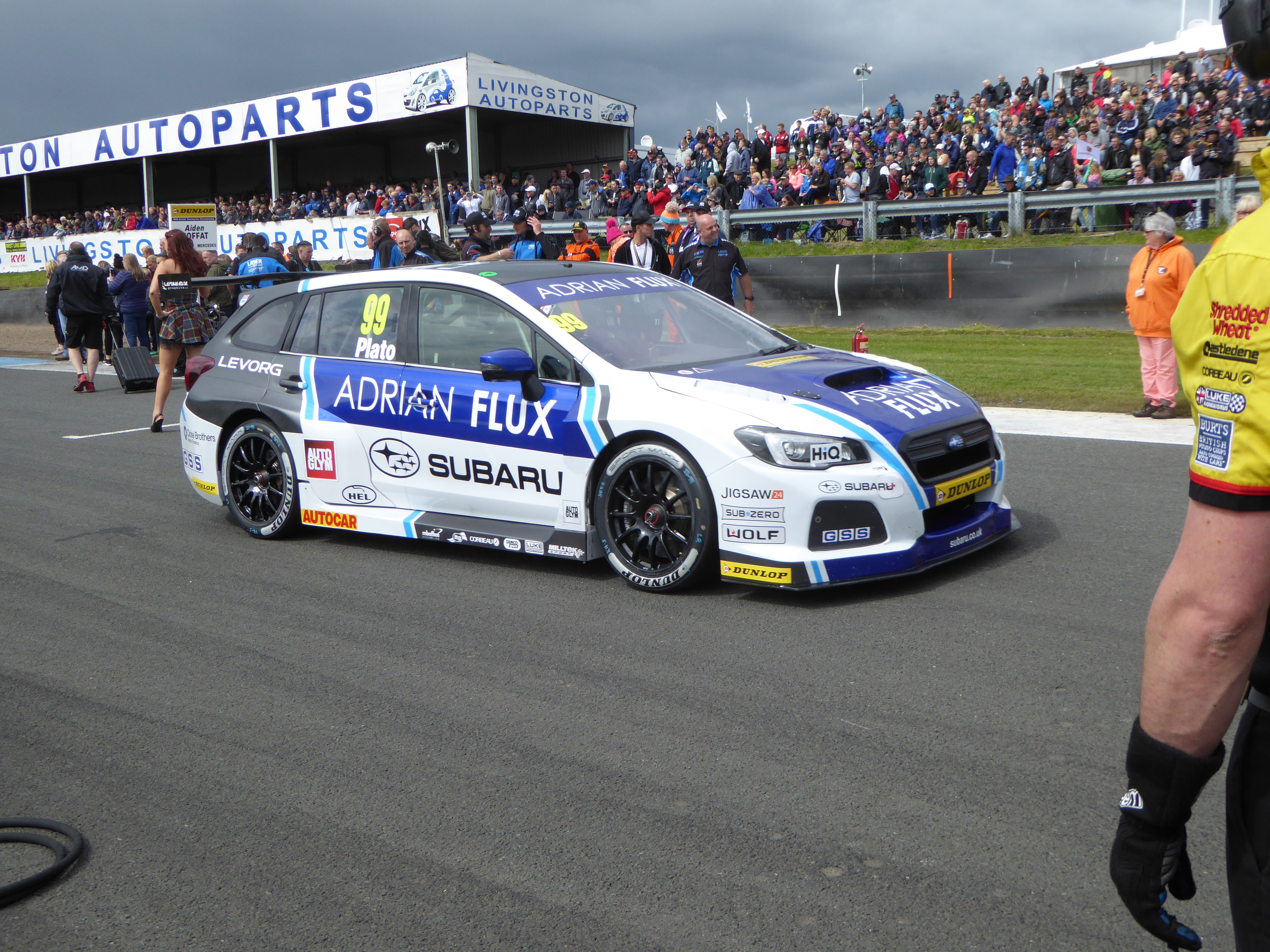
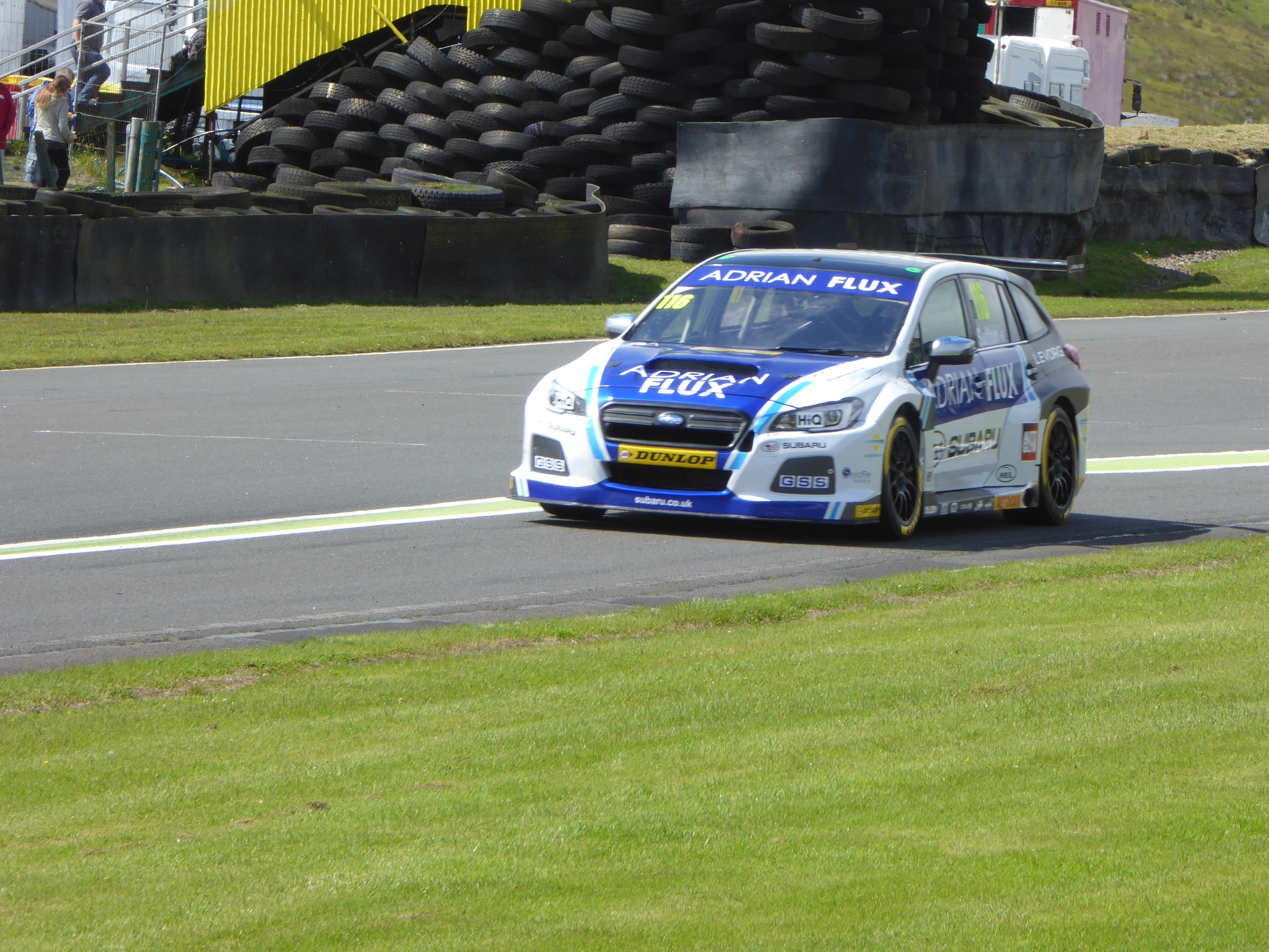
The team's drivers, at the Knockhill round of the 2017 British Touring Car Championship. Clockwise from top left: James Cole, Josh Price, Ashley Sutton and Jason Plato.

Ahead of the 2016 BTCC season, BMR and Subaru UK announced they were entering as a constructor team with the Subaru Levorg Sports Tourer. The collaboration is for a three-year term with a 4 driver line-up, including drivers Jason Plato and Colin Turkington.

== Renault UK Clio Cup ==
For 2015, Team BMR announced that they would field four Clio Renaultsport 200 Turbo EDCs in the Renault UK Clio Cup, a feeder and support series to the British Touring Car Championship.

== Results ==
=== British Touring Car Championship ===
Year	Team name	Car	Drivers	Races	Poles	Wins	F.L.	I.W.	Points	Pos.	I.C.	T.C.
2013	Team BMR Restart	Seat Leon (Rounds 1–5); Volkswagen CC (Rounds 6–10)	(United Kingdom) Warren Scott	23	0	0	0	0	1	32nd	21st	17th
2014	Chrome Edition Restart Racing	Volkswagen CC (Note: Goff and Scott drove a Vauxhall Insignia for the first 5 rounds before switching to the Volkswagen CC.)	(Switzerland) Alain Menu	29	0	0	0	0	176	11th	7th	4th
2014	Chrome Edition Restart Racing	Volkswagen CC	(Republic of Ireland) Árón Smith	30	0	2	2	2	201	9th	5th	4th
2014	Chrome Edition Restart Racing	Volkswagen CC	(United Kingdom) Jack Goff	30	0	0	1	0	119	15th	10th	4th
2014	Chrome Edition Restart Racing	Volkswagen CC	(United Kingdom) Warren Scott	27	0	0	0	0	19	21st	19th	4th
2015	Team BMR RCIB Insurance	Volkswagen CC	(United Kingdom) Jason Plato	30	1	6	5	9	344	2nd	2nd	1st
2015	Team BMR RCIB Insurance	Volkswagen CC	(Republic of Ireland) Árón Smith	28	1	0	0	3	209	11th	4th	1st
2015	Team BMR RCIB Insurance	Volkswagen CC	(United Kingdom) Colin Turkington	30	2	4	2	7	310	4th	1st	1st
2015	Team BMR RCIB Insurance	Volkswagen CC	(United Kingdom) Warren Scott	24	0	0	0	0	23	22nd	14th	1st
2015	Team BMR RCIB Insurance	Volkswagen CC	(Switzerland) Alain Menu	3	0	0	0	0	1	31st	26th	1st
2016	Silverline Subaru BMR Racing	Subaru Levorg GT	(United Kingdom) Jason Plato	27	1	1	1	-	256	7th	-	4th
2016	Silverline Subaru BMR Racing	Subaru Levorg GT	(United Kingdom) Colin Turkington	27	3	5	3	-	289	4th	-	4th
2016	Silverline Subaru BMR Racing	Subaru Levorg GT	(United Kingdom) James Cole	25	0	0	1	-	15	25th	-	4th
2016	Silverline Subaru BMR Racing	Subaru Levorg GT	(United Kingdom) Warren Scott	25	0	0	0	-	7	27th	-	4th
2017	Adrian Flux Subaru Racing	Subaru Levorg GT	(United Kingdom) Jason Plato	29	1	1	1	-	146	12th	-	3rd
2017	Adrian Flux Subaru Racing	Subaru Levorg GT	(United Kingdom) Ashley Sutton	30	1	6	4	-	372	1st	-	3rd
2017	Adrian Flux Subaru Racing	Subaru Levorg GT	(United Kingdom) James Cole	30	0	1	0	-	79	16th	-	3rd
2017	Adrian Flux Subaru Racing	Subaru Levorg GT	(United Kingdom) Josh Price	30	0	0	1	-	9	31st	-	3rd
2018	Adrian Flux Subaru Racing	Subaru Levorg GT	(United Kingdom) Jason Plato	30	0	0	0	-	26	27th	-	10th
2018	Adrian Flux Subaru Racing	Subaru Levorg GT	(United Kingdom) Ashley Sutton	30	0	6	3	-	256	4th	-	10th
2018	Adrian Flux Subaru Racing	Subaru Levorg GT	(United Kingdom) Josh Price	15	0	0	0	-	0	35th	-	10th
2019	Adrian Flux Subaru Racing	Subaru Levorg GT	(United Kingdom) Senna Proctor	30	0	0	0	-	49	20th	-	8th
2019	Adrian Flux Subaru Racing	Subaru Levorg GT	(United Kingdom) Ashley Sutton	30	1	1	1	-	233	8th	-	8th
