= 2017 British Touring Car Championship =

60th season of the British Touring Car Championship

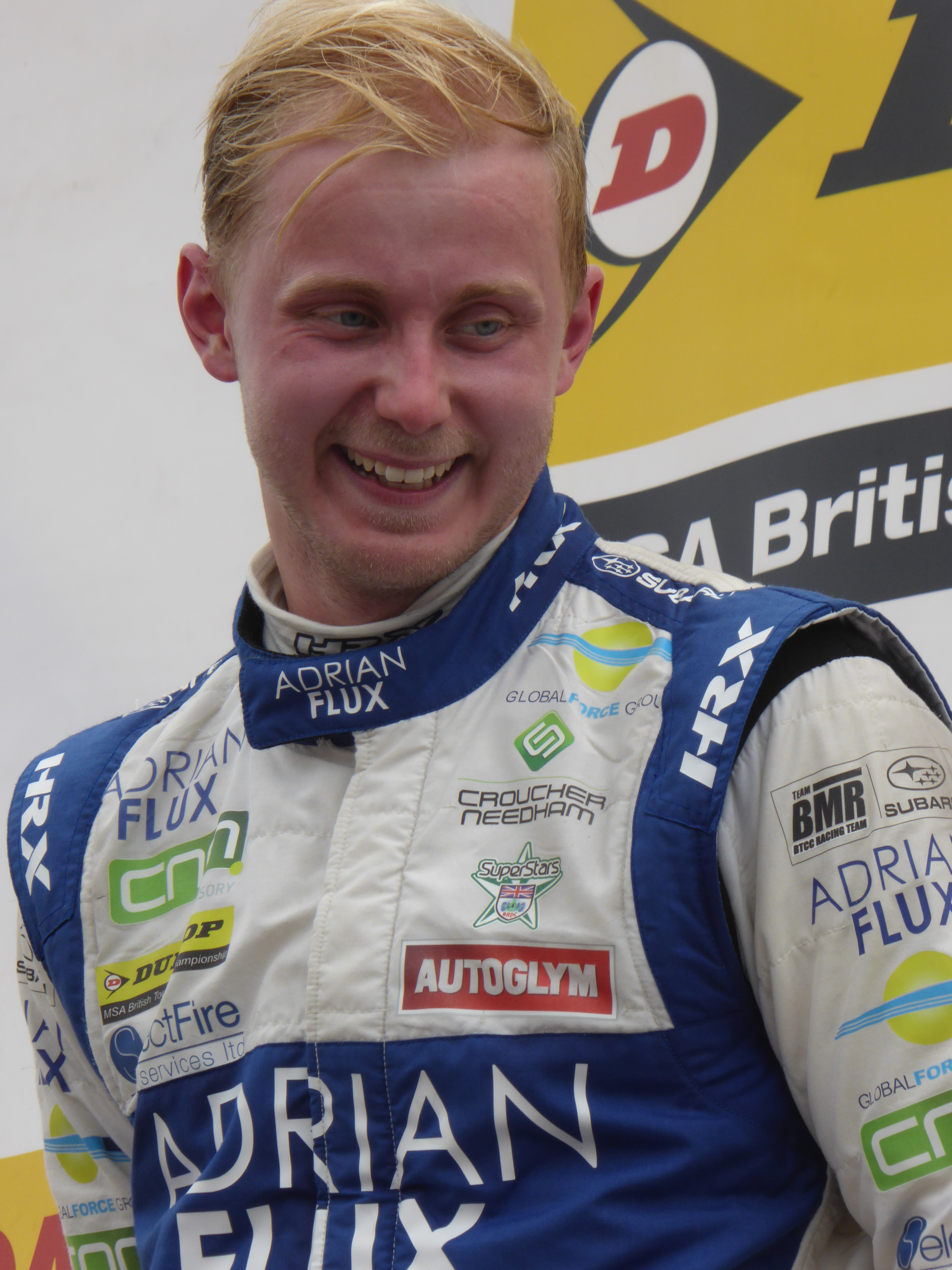
Ashley Sutton, after winning the second race at the Knockhill round. Despite failing to score a point in the opening meeting of the season at Brands Hatch, Sutton won six races thereafter to win the championship, the youngest champion since John Fitzpatrick in 1966.

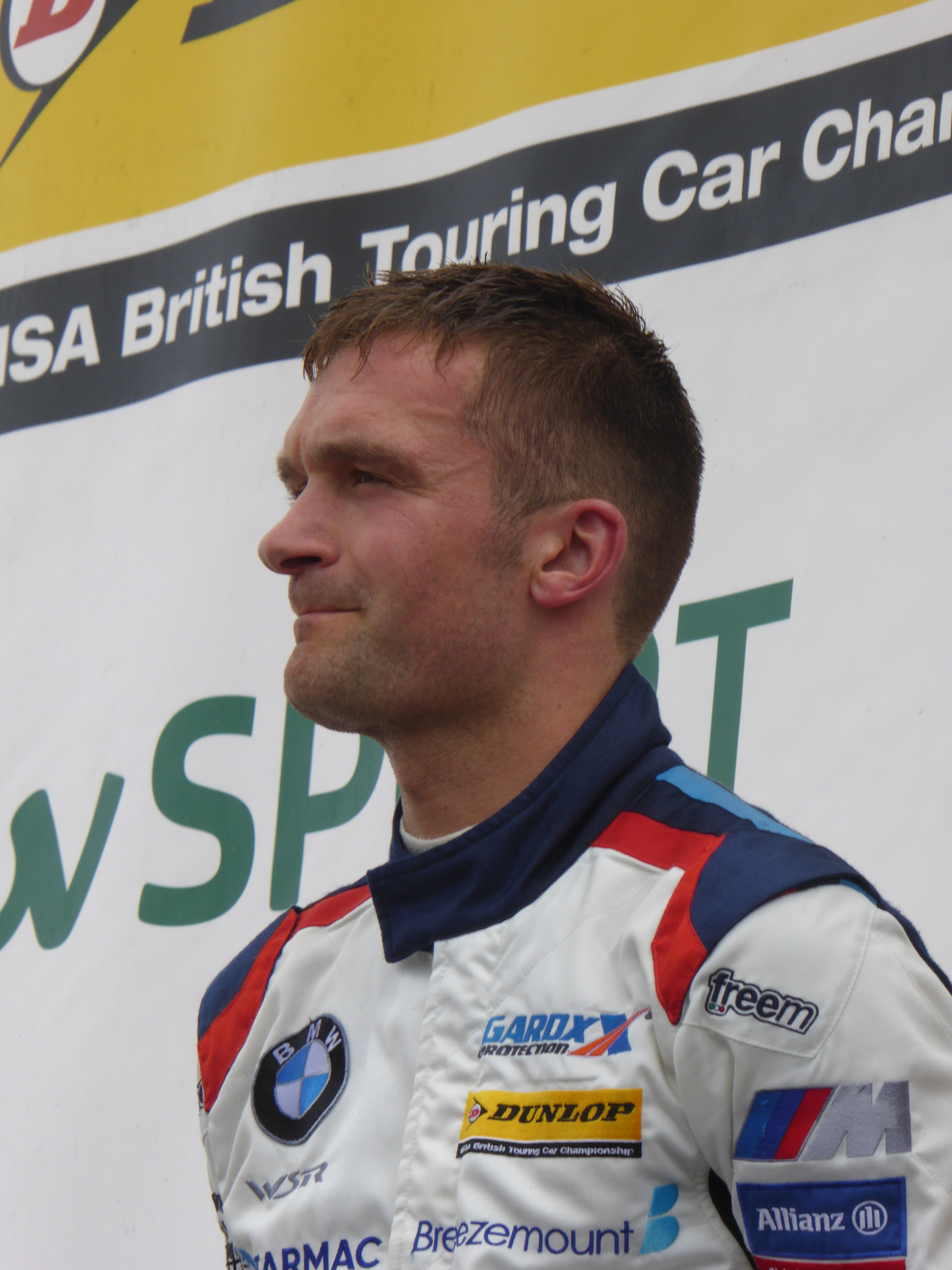
Colin Turkington finished second in the Drivers' Championship

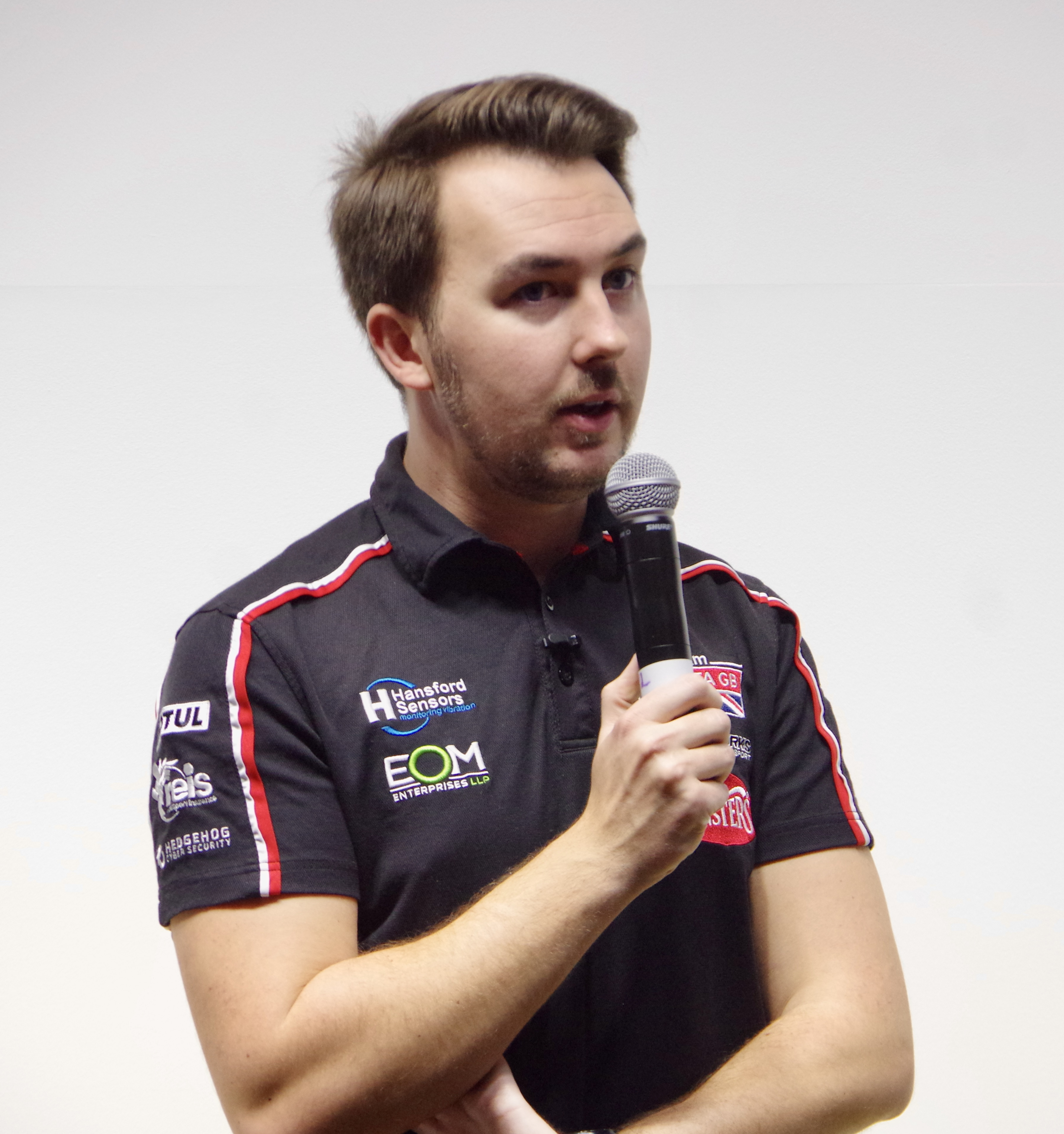
Tom Ingram came third in the championship, 40 points behind Colin Turkington.

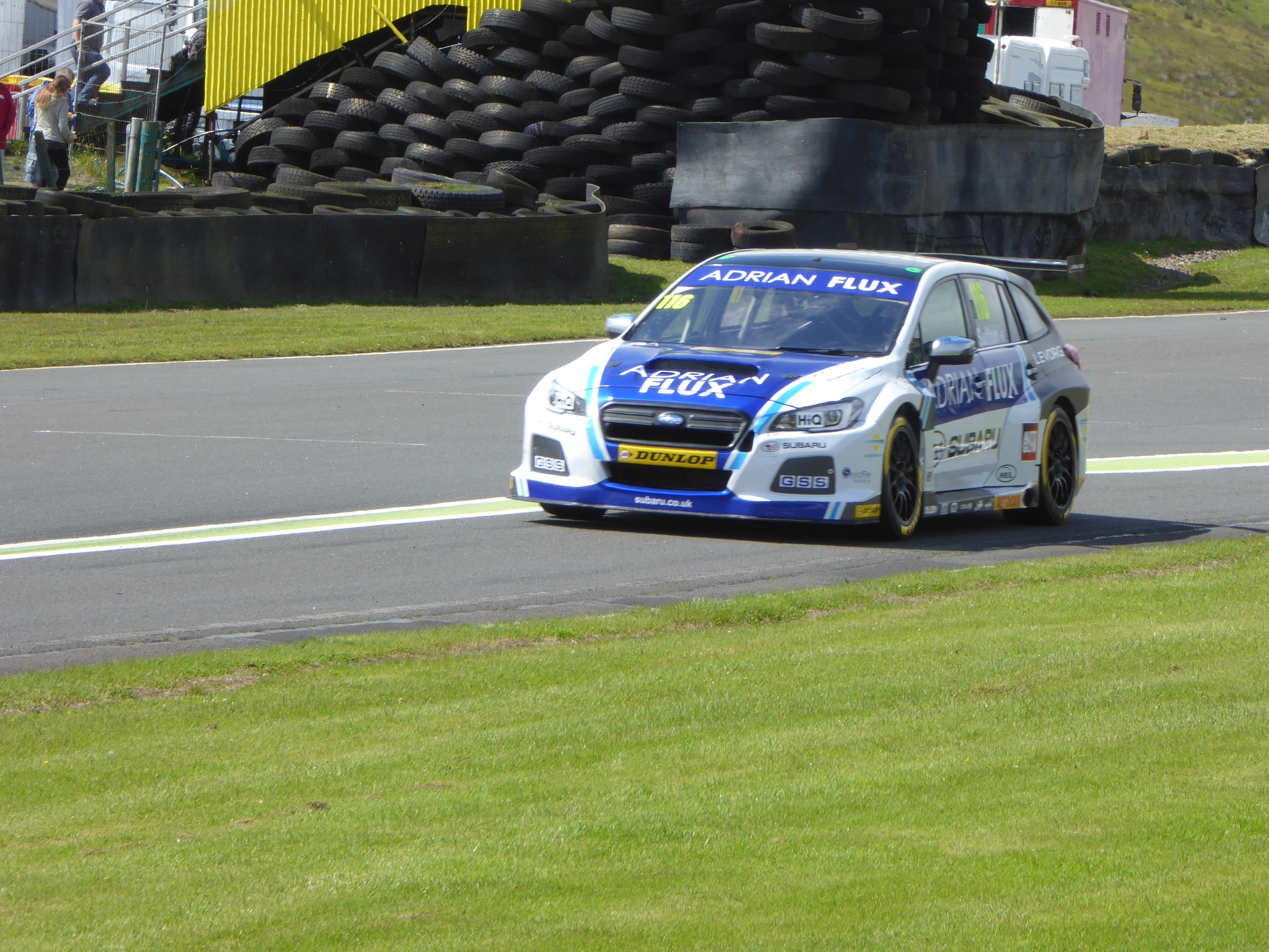
Ashley Sutton driving the Subaru Levorg GT at during Free Practice 2 at Knockhill

The 2017 Dunlop MSA British Touring Car Championship (commonly abbreviated as BTCC) was a motor racing championship for production-based touring cars held across England and Scotland. The championship featured a mix of professional motor racing teams and privately funded amateur drivers competing in highly modified versions of family cars which are sold to the general public and conform to the technical regulations for the championship. The 2017 season was the 60th British Touring Car Championship season and the seventh season for cars conforming to the Next Generation Touring Car (NGTC) technical specification.

With both BMW and Vauxhall returning to the series this year as manufacturer outfits - joining the existing Honda, Subaru and MG teams, the 2017 season featured five manufacturer backed teams on the grid for the first time since the end of the popular Super Touring era of the sport.

With a maximum grid of 32 cars for the 2017 season, a full entry list was announced which sees a total of 18 different named teams.

== Teams and drivers ==
Team	Car	Engine	No.	Drivers	Rounds
Constructor Entries
Power Maxed Racing	Vauxhall Astra	TOCA/Swindon	2	(United Kingdom) Tom Chilton	1–8, 10
Power Maxed Racing	Vauxhall Astra	TOCA/Swindon	18	(United Kingdom) Senna Proctor	All
Power Maxed Racing	Vauxhall Astra	TOCA/Swindon	37	(United Kingdom) Robert Huff	9
Team BMW	BMW 125i M Sport	BMW/Neil Brown	4	(United Kingdom) Colin Turkington	All
Team BMW	BMW 125i M Sport	BMW/Neil Brown	5	(United Kingdom) Rob Collard	All
BMW Pirtek Racing	BMW 125i M Sport	BMW/Neil Brown	77	(United Kingdom) Andrew Jordan	All
Adrian Flux Subaru Racing	Subaru Levorg GT	Subaru/Mountune	20	(United Kingdom) James Cole	All
Adrian Flux Subaru Racing	Subaru Levorg GT	Subaru/Mountune	99	(United Kingdom) Jason Plato	All
Adrian Flux Subaru Racing	Subaru Levorg GT	Subaru/Mountune	116	(United Kingdom) Ashley Sutton	All
A-Plan Academy (Note: Team was known as BMR Racing Academy for rounds 1-5.)	Subaru Levorg GT	Subaru/Mountune	28	(United Kingdom) Josh Price	All
MG Racing RCIB Insurance	MG6 GT	TOCA/Swindon	23	(United Kingdom) Daniel Lloyd	1–4
MG Racing RCIB Insurance	MG6 GT	TOCA/Swindon	40	(Republic of Ireland) Árón Taylor-Smith	All
MG Racing RCIB Insurance	MG6 GT	TOCA/Swindon	66	(United Kingdom) Josh Cook	5–10
Halfords Yuasa Racing	Honda Civic Type R	Honda/Neil Brown	25	(United Kingdom) Matt Neal	All
Halfords Yuasa Racing	Honda Civic Type R	Honda/Neil Brown	52	(United Kingdom) Gordon Shedden	All
Simpson Racing	Honda Civic Type R	Honda/Neil Brown	303	(United Kingdom) Matt Simpson	All
Independent Entries
Team Shredded Wheat Racing with DUO	Ford Focus ST	Ford/Mountune	3	(United Kingdom) Mat Jackson	All
Team Shredded Wheat Racing with DUO	Ford Focus ST	Ford/Mountune	6	(United Kingdom) Rory Butcher	7–10
Team Shredded Wheat Racing with DUO	Ford Focus ST	Ford/Mountune	30	(United Kingdom) Martin Depper	All
Team Shredded Wheat Racing with DUO	Ford Focus ST	Ford/Mountune	300	(United Kingdom) Luke Davenport	1–5
Team Parker Racing with Maximum Motorsport	Ford Focus ST	Ford/Mountune	7	(United Kingdom) Stephen Jelley	All
Team Parker Racing with Maximum Motorsport	Ford Focus ST	Ford/Mountune	66	(United Kingdom) Josh Cook	1–4
Team Parker Racing with Maximum Motorsport	Ford Focus ST	Ford/Mountune	95	(Sweden) Dennis Strandberg	5
Team Parker Racing with Maximum Motorsport	Ford Focus ST	Ford/Mountune	95	(United Kingdom) Stewart Lines	6–10
AmDtuning.com with Cobra Exhausts	Audi S3 Saloon	TOCA/Swindon	10	(United Kingdom) Ant Whorton-Eales	All
AmDtuning.com with Cobra Exhausts	Audi S3 Saloon	TOCA/Swindon	48	(United Kingdom) Ollie Jackson	All
Handy Motorsport	Toyota Avensis (2012)	TOCA/Swindon	11	(United Kingdom) Rob Austin	All
Autoaid/RCIB Insurance Racing	Volkswagen CC	TOCA/Swindon	12	(United Kingdom) Michael Epps	All
Autoaid/RCIB Insurance Racing	Volkswagen CC	TOCA/Swindon	61	(United Kingdom) Will Burns	1–9
TAG Racing	Volkswagen CC	TOCA/Swindon	24	(United Kingdom) Jake Hill	All
Laser Tools Racing	Mercedes-Benz A-Class	TOCA/Swindon	16	(United Kingdom) Aiden Moffat	All
Ciceley Motorsport with MAC Tools	Mercedes-Benz A-Class	TOCA/Swindon	33	(United Kingdom) Adam Morgan	All
BTC Norlin Racing	Chevrolet Cruze	TOCA/Swindon	17	(United Kingdom) Dave Newsham	All
BTC Norlin Racing	Chevrolet Cruze	TOCA/Swindon	22	(United Kingdom) Chris Smiley	All
Eurotech Racing	Honda Civic Type R	TOCA/Swindon	31	(United Kingdom) Jack Goff	All
Eurotech Racing	Honda Civic Type R	TOCA/Swindon	39	(United Kingdom) Brett Smith	6–10
Eurotech Racing	Honda Civic Type R	TOCA/Swindon	55	(United Kingdom) Jeff Smith	1–5
Speedworks Motorsport	Toyota Avensis (2015)	TOCA/Swindon	80	(United Kingdom) Tom Ingram	All

Key
Eligible for the Jack Sears Trophy for best rookie of the season

=== Driver Changes ===
Changed teams

- Andrew Jordan will move from Motorbase Performance to West Surrey Racing.
- Matt Simpson will move from Speedworks Motorsport to Team Dynamics.
- Chris Smiley will move from TLC Racing to BTC Norlin Racing.
- Dave Newsham will move from Power Maxed Racing to BTC Norlin Racing.
- Martin Depper will move from Eurotech Racing to Motorbase Performance.
- Jack Goff will move from Team IHG Rewards Club to Eurotech Racing.
- Árón Taylor-Smith will move from Team BKR to MG Racing RCIB Insurance.
- Ashley Sutton will move from MG Racing RCIB Insurance to Team BMR.
- Colin Turkington will move from Team BMR to West Surrey Racing.
- Josh Cook will move from MG Racing RCIB Insurance to Maximum Motorsport.

Entering/re-entering BTCC

- 2016 Ginetta GT4 Supercup runner-up Will Burns will make his debut in the BTCC with Team HARD.
- Senna Proctor son of former BTCC racer Mark Proctor, will make his debut in the series with Power Maxed Racing.
- Tom Chilton will return to the series with Power Maxed Racing, after a five-year absence, having last raced in the championship in 2011.
- 2016 Renault UK Clio Cup champion Ant Whorton-Eales will make his debut in the BTCC with AmD Tuning.
- Luke Davenport will make his debut in the BTCC with Motorbase Performance.
- Stephen Jelley will return to the series Team Parker Racing, after a seven-year absence, having last raced in the championship in 2009.
- Daniel Lloyd will return to the series with MG Racing RCIB Insurance, after taking part in three rounds in 2016 with Eurotech Racing.
- Former Renault UK Clio Cup racer Josh Price will make his debut in the championship with Team BMR.

Leaving BTCC

- Sam Tordoff will leave West Surrey Racing and the series to concentrate on other ventures.
- Alex Martin will leave the series and return to the Porsche Carrera Cup GB with Team Parker Racing.
- Stewart Lines vacated his seat at Maximum Motorsport following a cycling accident.
- Warren Scott will step down from driving duties to concentrate on his role as Team Principal of Team BMR. He will also take part in the 2017 British Rallycross Championship.

=== Team changes ===
- Team HARD will switch from Toyota Avensis to Volkswagen CC.
- Power Maxed Racing will switch from Chevrolet Cruze to Vauxhall Astra. The team will also enter the constructor class with manufacturer support from Vauxhall Motors.
- Motorbase Performance will expand to three cars having loaned TBL from Welch Motorsport.
- BTC Racing will return to the series with two Chevrolet Cruze having bought the two TBL from Power Maxed Racing. (Note: Power Maxed Racing use two TBL leased out by TOCA)
- West Surrey Racing will receive full manufacturer support from BMW, competing under the Team BMW banner.

=== Mid Season Changes ===
- Daniel Lloyd left MG Racing RCIB Insurance after Oulton Park and was replaced by former MG driver Josh Cook from Croft onwards. Scandinavian Touring Car driver Dennis Strandberg took Cook's place at Maximum Motorsport at Croft. Stewart Lines then took the race seat from Snetterton onwards.
- Brett Smith replaced his father Jeff Smith at Eurotech Racing after the Croft qualifying crash ruled Jeff out for the remainder of the season.
- Rory Butcher replaced the injured Luke Davenport from the Knockhill round for the remainder of the season.

== Race calendar ==
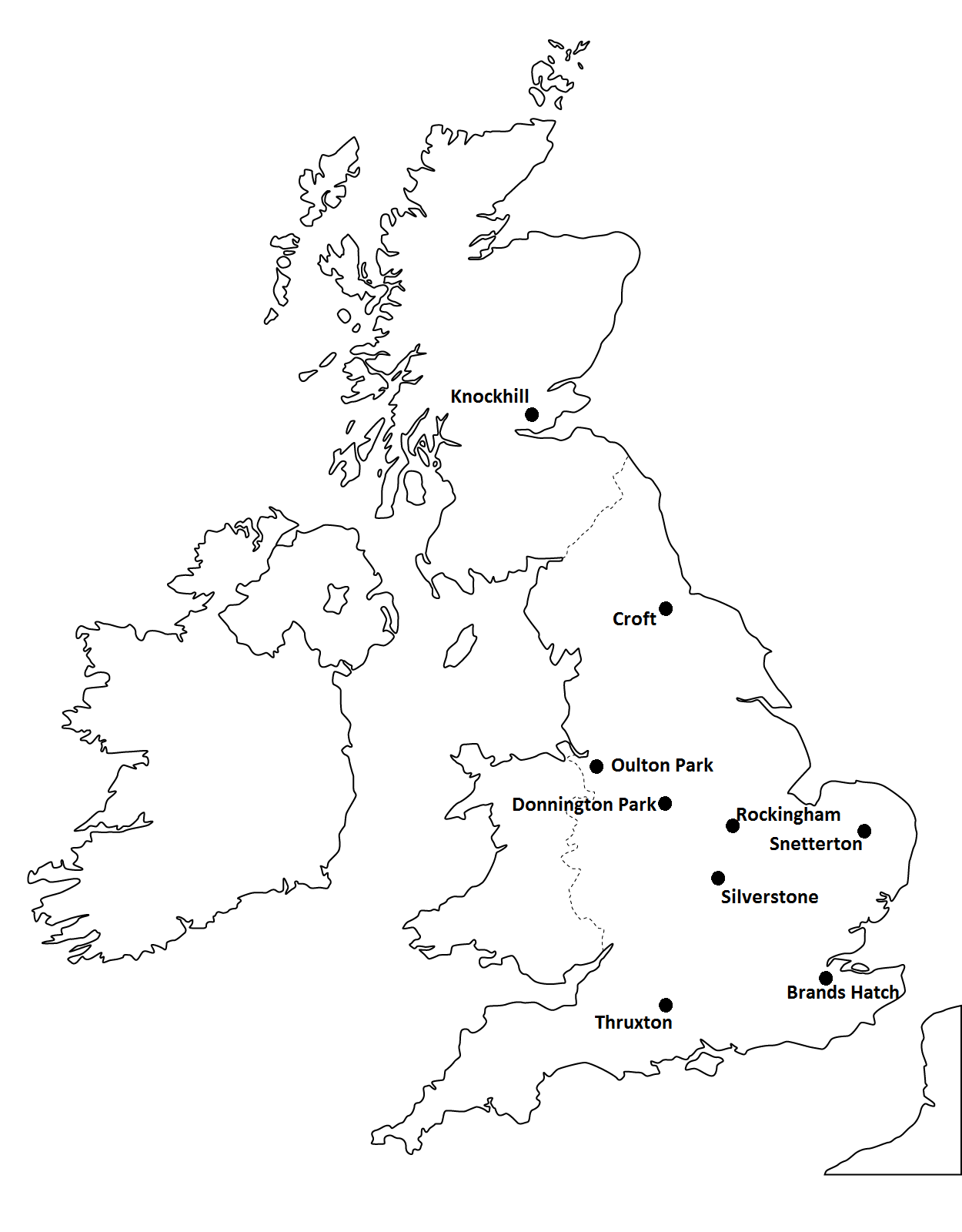
Circuit locations for the 2017 season

The provisional calendar was announced by the championship organisers on 15 June 2016, with no major changes from previous seasons.

Round		Circuit	Date
1	R1	Brands Hatch (Indy Circuit, Kent)	2 April
1	R2	Brands Hatch (Indy Circuit, Kent)	2 April
1	R3	Brands Hatch (Indy Circuit, Kent)	2 April
2	R4	Donington Park (National Circuit, Leicestershire)	16 April
2	R5	Donington Park (National Circuit, Leicestershire)	16 April
2	R6	Donington Park (National Circuit, Leicestershire)	16 April
3	R7	Thruxton Circuit (Hampshire)	7 May
3	R8	Thruxton Circuit (Hampshire)	7 May
3	R9	Thruxton Circuit (Hampshire)	7 May
4	R10	Oulton Park (Island Circuit, Cheshire)	21 May
4	R11	Oulton Park (Island Circuit, Cheshire)	21 May
4	R12	Oulton Park (Island Circuit, Cheshire)	21 May
5	R13	Croft Circuit (North Yorkshire)	11 June
5	R14	Croft Circuit (North Yorkshire)	11 June
5	R15	Croft Circuit (North Yorkshire)	11 June
6	R16	Snetterton Motor Racing Circuit (300 Circuit, Norfolk)	30 July
6	R17	Snetterton Motor Racing Circuit (300 Circuit, Norfolk)	30 July
6	R18	Snetterton Motor Racing Circuit (300 Circuit, Norfolk)	30 July
7	R19	Knockhill Racing Circuit (Fife)	13 August
7	R20	Knockhill Racing Circuit (Fife)	13 August
7	R21	Knockhill Racing Circuit (Fife)	13 August
8	R22	Rockingham Motor Speedway (International Super Sports Car Circuit, Northamptonshire)	27 August
8	R23	Rockingham Motor Speedway (International Super Sports Car Circuit, Northamptonshire)	27 August
8	R24	Rockingham Motor Speedway (International Super Sports Car Circuit, Northamptonshire)	27 August
9	R25	Silverstone Circuit (National Circuit, Northamptonshire)	17 September
9	R26	Silverstone Circuit (National Circuit, Northamptonshire)	17 September
9	R27	Silverstone Circuit (National Circuit, Northamptonshire)	17 September
10	R28	Brands Hatch (Grand Prix Circuit, Kent)	1 October
10	R29	Brands Hatch (Grand Prix Circuit, Kent)	1 October
10	R30	Brands Hatch (Grand Prix Circuit, Kent)	1 October

== Results ==
Round		Circuit	Pole position	Fastest lap	Winning driver	Winning team	Winning independent	Winning JST
1	R1	Brands Hatch Indy	(United Kingdom) Jeff Smith	(United Kingdom) Gordon Shedden	(United Kingdom) Tom Ingram	Speedworks Motorsport	(United Kingdom) Tom Ingram	(United Kingdom) Senna Proctor
1	R2	Brands Hatch Indy		(United Kingdom) Colin Turkington	(United Kingdom) Gordon Shedden	Halfords Yuasa Racing	(United Kingdom) Tom Ingram	(United Kingdom) Senna Proctor
1	R3	Brands Hatch Indy		(United Kingdom) Colin Turkington	(United Kingdom) Andrew Jordan	BMW Pirtek Racing	(United Kingdom) Adam Morgan	(United Kingdom) Senna Proctor
2	R4	Donington Park	(United Kingdom) Rob Austin	(United Kingdom) Colin Turkington	(United Kingdom) Aiden Moffat	Laser Tools Racing	(United Kingdom) Aiden Moffat	(United Kingdom) Senna Proctor
2	R5	Donington Park		(United Kingdom) Andrew Jordan	(United Kingdom) Tom Ingram	Speedworks Motorsport	(United Kingdom) Tom Ingram	(United Kingdom) Ant Whorton-Eales
2	R6	Donington Park		(United Kingdom) Daniel Lloyd	(United Kingdom) Colin Turkington	Team BMW	(United Kingdom) Adam Morgan	(United Kingdom) Senna Proctor
3	R7	Thruxton Circuit	(United Kingdom) Matt Neal	(United Kingdom) Ashley Sutton	(United Kingdom) Matt Neal	Halfords Yuasa Racing	(United Kingdom) Jack Goff	(United Kingdom) Senna Proctor
3	R8	Thruxton Circuit		(United Kingdom) Matt Neal	(United Kingdom) Rob Collard	Team BMW	(United Kingdom) Tom Ingram	(United Kingdom) Luke Davenport
3	R9	Thruxton Circuit		(United Kingdom) Tom Chilton	(United Kingdom) Colin Turkington	Team BMW	(United Kingdom) Tom Ingram	(United Kingdom) Senna Proctor
4	R10	Oulton Park	(United Kingdom) Matt Neal	(United Kingdom) Matt Neal	(United Kingdom) Andrew Jordan	BMW Pirtek Racing	(United Kingdom) Aiden Moffat	(United Kingdom) Senna Proctor
4	R11	Oulton Park		(United Kingdom) Ashley Sutton	(United Kingdom) Ashley Sutton	Adrian Flux Subaru Racing	(United Kingdom) Josh Cook	(United Kingdom) Josh Price
4	R12	Oulton Park		(United Kingdom) Tom Ingram	(United Kingdom) Gordon Shedden	Halfords Yuasa Racing	(United Kingdom) Rob Austin	(United Kingdom) Luke Davenport
5	R13	Croft Circuit	(United Kingdom) Ashley Sutton	(United Kingdom) Colin Turkington	(United Kingdom) Ashley Sutton	Adrian Flux Subaru Racing	(United Kingdom) Mat Jackson	(United Kingdom) Senna Proctor
5	R14	Croft Circuit		(United Kingdom) Colin Turkington	(United Kingdom) Colin Turkington	Team BMW	(United Kingdom) Mat Jackson	(United Kingdom) Ant Whorton-Eales
5	R15	Croft Circuit		(United Kingdom) Mat Jackson	(United Kingdom) Mat Jackson	Team Shredded Wheat Racing with DUO	(United Kingdom) Mat Jackson	(United Kingdom) Senna Proctor
6	R16	Snetterton Motor Racing Circuit	(United Kingdom) Jack Goff	(United Kingdom) Colin Turkington	(United Kingdom) Ashley Sutton	Adrian Flux Subaru Racing	(United Kingdom) Jack Goff	(United Kingdom) Will Burns
6	R17	Snetterton Motor Racing Circuit		(United Kingdom) Josh Price	(United Kingdom) Ashley Sutton	Adrian Flux Subaru Racing	(United Kingdom) Mat Jackson	(United Kingdom) Will Burns
6	R18	Snetterton Motor Racing Circuit		(United Kingdom) Rob Collard	(United Kingdom) Gordon Shedden	Halfords Yuasa Racing	(United Kingdom) Mat Jackson	(United Kingdom) Senna Proctor
7	R19	Knockhill Racing Circuit	(United Kingdom) Jason Plato	(United Kingdom) Colin Turkington	(United Kingdom) Jason Plato	Adrian Flux Subaru Racing	(United Kingdom) Tom Ingram	(United Kingdom) Senna Proctor
7	R20	Knockhill Racing Circuit		(United Kingdom) Jason Plato	(United Kingdom) Ashley Sutton	Adrian Flux Subaru Racing	(United Kingdom) Dave Newsham	(United Kingdom) Rory Butcher
7	R21	Knockhill Racing Circuit		(United Kingdom) Tom Ingram	(United Kingdom) Tom Ingram	Speedworks Motorsport	(United Kingdom) Tom Ingram	(United Kingdom) Rory Butcher
8	R22	Rockingham Motor Speedway	(United Kingdom) James Cole	(United Kingdom) Matt Neal	(United Kingdom) James Cole	Adrian Flux Subaru Racing	(United Kingdom) Jack Goff	(United Kingdom) Josh Price
8	R23	Rockingham Motor Speedway		(United Kingdom) Ashley Sutton	(United Kingdom) Ashley Sutton	Adrian Flux Subaru Racing	(United Kingdom) Mat Jackson	(United Kingdom) Senna Proctor
8	R24	Rockingham Motor Speedway		(United Kingdom) Ashley Sutton	(United Kingdom) Andrew Jordan	BMW Pirtek Racing	(United Kingdom) Adam Morgan	(United Kingdom) Senna Proctor
9	R25	Silverstone Circuit	(United Kingdom) Jack Goff	(United Kingdom) Adam Morgan	(United Kingdom) Tom Ingram	Speedworks Motorsport	(United Kingdom) Tom Ingram	(United Kingdom) Ant Whorton-Eales
9	R26	Silverstone Circuit		(United Kingdom) Gordon Shedden	(United Kingdom) Jack Goff	Eurotech Racing	(United Kingdom) Jack Goff	(United Kingdom) Brett Smith
9	R27	Silverstone Circuit		(United Kingdom) Senna Proctor	(United Kingdom) Matt Neal	Halfords Yuasa Racing	(United Kingdom) Dave Newsham	(United Kingdom) Ant Whorton-Eales
10	R28	Brands Hatch GP	(United Kingdom) Jack Goff	(United Kingdom) Gordon Shedden	(United Kingdom) Aiden Moffat	Laser Tools Racing	(United Kingdom) Aiden Moffat	(United Kingdom) Senna Proctor
10	R29	Brands Hatch GP		(United Kingdom) Colin Turkington	(United Kingdom) Colin Turkington	Team BMW	(United Kingdom) Mat Jackson	(United Kingdom) Brett Smith
10	R30	Brands Hatch GP		(United Kingdom) Martin Depper	(United Kingdom) Rob Austin	Handy Motorsport	(United Kingdom) Rob Austin	(United Kingdom) Rory Butcher

== Championship standings ==
Points system
1st	2nd	3rd	4th	5th	6th	7th	8th	9th	10th	11th	12th	13th	14th	15th	R1 PP	Fastest lap	Lead a lap
20	17	15	13	11	10	9	8	7	6	5	4	3	2	1	1	1	1

Notes

- No driver may collect more than one point for leading a lap per race regardless of how many laps they lead.

=== Drivers' Championship ===
(key)

Pos.	Driver	BHI			DON			THR			OUL			CRO			SNE			KNO			ROC			SIL			BHGP			Pts
1	(United Kingdom) Ashley Sutton	16	Ret	21	13	3	3	6	8	6	3	1*	4	1*	2	2	1*	1*	Ret	2	1*	4	2	1*	5	5	4	11	3	12	3	372
2	(United Kingdom) Colin Turkington	Ret	9	2	4	5	1*	7	6	1*	29	13	5	2	1*	6	7*	2	3	3	3	3	6	3	6	4	3	22	15	1*	Ret	351
3	(United Kingdom) Tom Ingram	1*	3*	11	5*	1*	5	4	3	2	Ret	Ret	26	8	Ret	16	8	10	6	6	8	1*	Ret	9	8	1*	2*	4	2	6	4	311
4	(United Kingdom) Gordon Shedden	2	1*	7	7	6	DSQ	2	2	4	7	4	1*	5	4	9	13	7	1*	11	6	2	30	Ret	12	11	7	21	7	2	6	309
5	(United Kingdom) Rob Collard	7	2	6	6	2	12	10	1*	7	5	2	6	4	3	8	9	3	2	4	4	11	17	8	Ret	Ret	DNS	DNS	WD	WD	WD	256
6	(United Kingdom) Jack Goff	4	12	8	12	9	6	3	4	3	21	16	15	21	22	21	2*	5	8	14	Ret	16	3	5	4	2	1*	9	12	8	2	245
7	(United Kingdom) Matt Neal	Ret	11	4	2	7	Ret	1*	29*	11	2	3	2	Ret	18	5	3	9	Ret	9	Ret	8	5	Ret	13	13	13	1*	10	3	8	243
8	(United Kingdom) Mat Jackson	8	5	13	11	Ret	Ret	8	20	14	6	7	Ret	3	7	1*	11	4	4	Ret	16	7	7	2	15	24	Ret	10	4	4	7	210
9	(United Kingdom) Andrew Jordan	6	6	1*	15	15	18	28	14	13	1*	5*	3*	6	5	7	4	6	21*	13	Ret	13	12	7	1*	Ret	27	8	27	17	13	203
10	(United Kingdom) Adam Morgan	3	4	5	8	11	2	5	7	9	28	Ret	DNS	Ret	15	12	Ret	19	Ret	8	Ret	17	8	6	2	3	6	6	Ret	19	9	187
11	(United Kingdom) Rob Austin	5	DSQ	18	3	Ret	13	9	5	5	9	8	7	11	8	4	Ret	15	Ret	23	Ret	20	31	26	Ret	9	5	5	9	9	1*	174
12	(United Kingdom) Jason Plato	12	Ret	DNS	Ret	20	16	23	25	28	12	11	11	10	6	3	5	24	16	1*	2*	6	10	4	3	23	15	Ret	28	24	22	146
13	(United Kingdom) Aiden Moffat	18	Ret	Ret	1*	14*	8	12	9	8	4	14	Ret	23	14	Ret	19	29	12	26	15	15	19	14	17	8	Ret	14	1*	5*	14	121
14	(United Kingdom) Dave Newsham	Ret	17	14	19	8	4*	15	13	12	24	19	13	Ret	19	15	24	20	13	10	7	10	13	23	10	7	9	3	8	Ret	17	108
15	(United Kingdom) Tom Chilton	10	8	3	Ret	10	14	14	12	10	19	24	19	9	Ret	20	10	12	10	16	12	18	11	16	24				5	7	15	100
16	(United Kingdom) James Cole	Ret	21	Ret	Ret	24	22	27	28	26	23	Ret	NC	Ret	16	Ret	15	8	5	5	5	5	1*	13	Ret	17	21	15	19	22	26	79
17	(United Kingdom) Michael Epps	9	10	9	Ret	23	21	25	18	20	11	10	8	22	12	Ret	Ret	18	Ret	24	17	23	15	Ret	19	10	10	12	18	10	5	77
18	(United Kingdom) Josh Cook	13	7	26	10	4	7	Ret	30	22	8	6	Ret	7	23	23	Ret	28	Ret	12	Ret	29	4	Ret	Ret	EX	18	Ret	25	26	Ret	75
19	(United Kingdom) Senna Proctor	17	13	19	14	19	10	16	23	19	15	18	16	14	13	14	17	23	9	7	Ret	25	21	11	7	15	22	18	6	14	Ret	63
20	(United Kingdom) Jake Hill	NC	19	10	Ret	26	11	Ret	21	15	10	9	9	12	Ret	19	6	11	7	21	Ret	22	24	17	16	Ret	17	Ret	26	16	10	63
21	(United Kingdom) Chris Smiley	21	Ret	25	Ret	17	17	19	15	18	NC	27	20	20	20	13	14	17	20	19	14	26	20	10	9	18	11	7	11	Ret	11	45
22	(United Kingdom) Ollie Jackson	22	14	16	17	Ret	15	18	16	17	14	26	18	13	9	10*	18	14	Ret	28	19	Ret	14	12	11	12	Ret	Ret	14	15	16	42
23	(United Kingdom) Ant Whorton-Eales	25	Ret	23	16	12	Ret	30	24	DNS	27	28	21	16	11	17	20	21	11	17	10	27*	18	18	Ret	6	23	13	16	18	25	34
24	(United Kingdom) Matt Simpson	11	20	Ret	18	Ret	20	13	11	16	Ret	25	14	Ret	17	18	12	13	Ret	22	13	14	28	Ret	18	25	24	20	13	20	24	30
25	(United Kingdom) Robert Huff																									16	8	2*				26
26	(United Kingdom) Jeff Smith	Ret	16	17	9	13	Ret	11	10	27	13	21	24	WD	WD	WD																25
27	(Republic of Ireland) Árón Taylor-Smith	14	15	12	23	18	9	20	27	25	16	12	25	WD	WD	WD	Ret	27	Ret	15	Ret	24	16	15	20	19	14	17	23	13	20	25
28	(United Kingdom) Martin Depper	15	Ret	22	Ret	25	24	24	Ret	DNS	26	20	23	18	10	11	22	22	17	27	11	12	22	20	23	22	20	16	21	27	23	22
29	(United Kingdom) Rory Butcher																			25	9	9	25	19	14	20	19	Ret	24	21	12	20
30	(United Kingdom) Brett Smith																Ret	Ret	14	30	18	19	27	24	21	14	12	19	17	11	18	13
31	(United Kingdom) Josh Price	24	24	24	21	28	23	29	26	24	22	15	27	Ret	24	Ret	Ret	26	19	18	DSQ	Ret	9	Ret	Ret	21	16	Ret	22	23	Ret	9
32	(United Kingdom) Luke Davenport	19	Ret	20	DSQ	16	25	17	17	Ret	18	17	10	WD	WD	WD																6
33	(United Kingdom) Daniel Lloyd	23	23	15	Ret	21	Ret	21	Ret	Ret	20	22	12																			6
34	(United Kingdom) Stephen Jelley	20	18	27	20	22	19	22	22	21	17	23	17	15	Ret	Ret	21	25	15	20	Ret	21	26	22	Ret	Ret	26	Ret	20	DNS	19	2
35	(United Kingdom) Will Burns	26	22	28	22	27	Ret	26	19	23	25	29	22	17	Ret	Ret	16	16	18	29	20	Ret	23	21	Ret	Ret	DNS	DNS				0
36	(Sweden) Dennis Strandberg													19	21	22																0
37	(United Kingdom) Stewart Lines																23	Ret	Ret	Ret	21	28	29	25	22	Ret	25	Ret	29	25	21	0
Pos.	Driver	BHI			DON			THR			OUL			CRO			SNE			KNO			ROC			SIL			BHGP			Pts

=== Manufacturers'/Constructors' Championship ===
Pos.	Manufacturer/Constructor	BHI			DON			THR			OUL			CRO			SNE			KNO			ROC			SIL			BHGP			Pts
1	BMW / West Surrey Racing	6	2	1	4	2	1	7	1	1	1	2	3	2	1	6	4	2	2	3	3	3	6	3	6	4	3	8	15	1	13	782
1	BMW / West Surrey Racing	7	6	2	6	5	12	10	6	7	5	5	5	4	3	7	7	3	3	4	4	12	17	8	Ret	Ret	27	22	27	17	Ret	782
2	Subaru / Team BMR	12	21	21	13	3	3	6	8	6	3	1	4	1	2	2	1	1	5	1	1	4	2	1	3	5	4	11	3	12	3	751
2	Subaru / Team BMR	16	24	24	22	20	16	23	25	24	12	11	11	10	6	3	5	8	16	2	2	5	10	4	5	23	15	Ret	28	24	22	751
3	Honda / Team Dynamics	2	1	4	2	6	Ret	1	2	4	2	3	1	5	4	5	3	7	1	9	6	2	5	Ret	12	11	7	1	7	2	6	726
3	Honda / Team Dynamics	Ret	11	7	7	7	DSQ	2	29	11	7	4	2	Ret	18	9	13	9	Ret	11	Ret	8	30	Ret	13	13	13	21	10	3	8	726
4	Vauxhall / Power Maxed Racing	10	8	3	14	10	10	14	12	10	15	18	16	9	13	14	10	12	9	7	12	18	11	11	7	15	8	2	5	7	15	580
4	Vauxhall / Power Maxed Racing	17	13	19	Ret	19	14	16	23	19	19	24	19	14	Ret	20	17	23	10	16	Ret	25	21	16	24	16	22	18	6	14	Ret	580
5	MG / Triple Eight Racing	14	15	12	24	18	9	20	27	25	16	12	12	7	23	23	Ret	27	Ret	12	Ret	24	4	15	20	19	14	17	23	13	20	369
5	MG / Triple Eight Racing	23	23	15	Ret	21	Ret	21	Ret	Ret	20	22	25	WD	WD	WD	Ret	28	Ret	15	Ret	29	16	Ret	Ret	EX	18	Ret	25	26	Ret	369
Pos.	Manufacturer/Constructor	BHI			DON			THR			OUL			CRO			SNE			KNO			ROC			SIL			BHGP			Pts

=== Teams' Championship ===
Pos.	Team	Points
1	Team BMW	594
2	Halfords Yuasa Racing	545
3	Adrian Flux Subaru Racing	513
4	Speedworks Motorsport	307
5	Eurotech Racing	286
6	Team Shredded Wheat Racing with DUO	235
7	Power Maxed Racing	201
8	BMW Pirtek Racing	200
9	Ciceley Motorsport with MAC Tools	191
10	Handy Motorsport	173
11	BTC Norlin Racing	162
12	Laser Tools Racing	124
13	Autoaid/RCIB Insurance Racing	82
14	AmDtuning.com with Cobra Exhausts	79
15	TAG Racing	68
16	MG Racing RCIB Insurance	64
17	Team Parker Racing with Maximum Motorsport	61
18	Simpson Racing	27
19	A-Plan Academy	8

=== Independents Drivers' Trophy ===
Pos.	Driver	Points
1	(United Kingdom) Tom Ingram	418
2	(United Kingdom) Jack Goff	379
3	(United Kingdom) Mat Jackson	344
4	(United Kingdom) Adam Morgan	293
5	(United Kingdom) Rob Austin	286
6	(United Kingdom) Dave Newsham	268
7	(United Kingdom) Aiden Moffat	243
8	(United Kingdom) Michael Epps	199
9	(United Kingdom) Ollie Jackson	199
10	(United Kingdom) Jake Hill	194
11	(United Kingdom) Chris Smiley	187
12	(United Kingdom) Ant Whorton-Eales	157
13	(United Kingdom) Martin Depper	136
14	(United Kingdom) Stephen Jelley	106
15	(United Kingdom) Josh Cook	99
16	(United Kingdom) Rory Butcher	76
17	(United Kingdom) Jeff Smith	73
18	(United Kingdom) Will Burns	70
19	(United Kingdom) Brett Smith	63
20	(United Kingdom) Luke Davenport	60
21	(United Kingdom) Stewart Lines	17
22	(Sweden) Dennis Strandberg	15

=== Independent Teams' Trophy ===
Pos.	Team	Points
1	Speedworks Motorsport	425
2	Eurotech Racing	408
3	Team Shredded Wheat Racing with DUO	404
4	BTC Norlin Racing	329
5	Ciceley Motorsport with MAC Tools	308
6	Handy Motorsport	302
7	AmDtuning.com with Cobra Exhausts	280
8	Laser Tools Racing	267
9	Autoaid/RCIB Insurance Racing	265
10	Team Parker Racing with Maximum Motorsport	242
11	TAG Racing	228

=== Jack Sears Trophy ===
Pos.	Driver	BHI			DON			THR			OUL			CRO			SNE			KNO			ROC			SIL			BHGP			Pts
1	(United Kingdom) Senna Proctor	17	13	19	14	19	10	16	23	19	15	18	16	14	13	14	17	23	9	7	Ret	25	21	11	7	15	22	18	6	14	Ret	503
2	(United Kingdom) Ant Whorton-Eales	25	Ret	23	16	12	Ret	30	24	DNS	27	28	21	16	11	17	20	21	11	17	10	27	18	18	Ret	6	23	13	16	18	25	410
3	(United Kingdom) Josh Price	24	24	24	21	28	23	29	26	24	22	15	27	Ret	24	Ret	Ret	26	19	18	DSQ	Ret	9	Ret	Ret	21	16	Ret	22	23	Ret	295
4	(United Kingdom) Will Burns	26	22	28	22	27	Ret	26	19	23	25	29	22	17	Ret	Ret	16	16	18	29	20	Ret	23	21	Ret	Ret	DNS	DNS				269
5	(United Kingdom) Brett Smith																Ret	Ret	14	30	18	19	27	24	21	14	12	19	17	11	18	197
6	(United Kingdom) Rory Butcher																			25	9	9	25	19	14	20	19	Ret	24	21	12	168
7	(United Kingdom) Luke Davenport	19	Ret	20	DSQ	16	25	17	17	Ret	18	17	10	WD	WD	WD																157
8	(Sweden) Dennis Strandberg													19	21	22																43
Pos.	Driver	BHI			DON			THR			OUL			CRO			SNE			KNO			ROC			SIL			BHGP			Pts
