= Subaru Levorg =

Station wagon car produced by Subaru

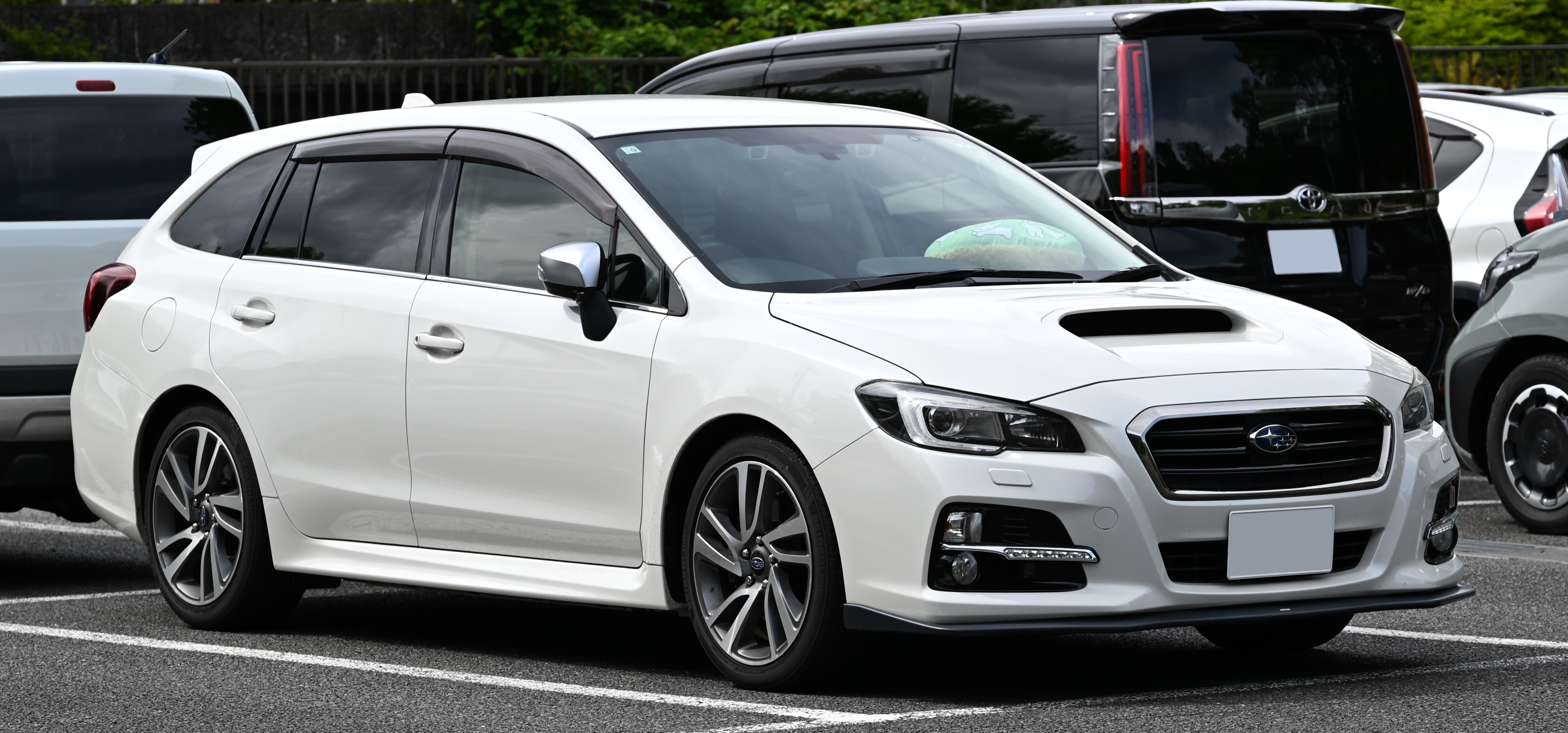
- 2014–2017 Subaru Levorg GT-S Eyesight (VM)

Overview
- Manufacturer: Subaru
- Also called: Subaru WRX wagon (2021–present); Subaru WRX Sportswagon (Australia, 2021–present); Subaru WRX GT (New Zealand, 2021–present)
- Production: 2014–present
- Assembly: Japan: Ōta, Gunma (Fuji Heavy Industries, Ltd.)

Body and chassis
- Class: Mid-size car
- Body style: 5-door station wagon
- Layout: Front-engine, four-wheel-drive

Chronology
- Predecessor: Subaru Legacy Wagon; Subaru Outback Sport (Levorg Layback)

The Subaru Levorg (Japanese: スバル・レヴォーグ, Hepburn: Subaru Revuōgu) is a mid-size car manufactured since 2014 by Subaru. According to the company, the name Levorg is a blended word or portmanteau of three words: LEgacy, reVOlution and touRinG. The first Levorg shares its platform with the Impreza/WRX and the Legacy. The second generation Levorg sits on the Subaru Global Platform used by the majority of Subaru's family cars.

The Levorg was first shown as a pre-production concept car at the 43rd Tokyo Motor Show in November 2013. Subaru began collecting orders on the Japanese market on 4 January 2014, and the car went on sale in May. In February 2015, Subaru announced the introduction of the Levorg on the European market, and the car made its première on the continent at the Geneva Motor Show in March of the same year.

== First generation (VM; 2014) ==
First generation
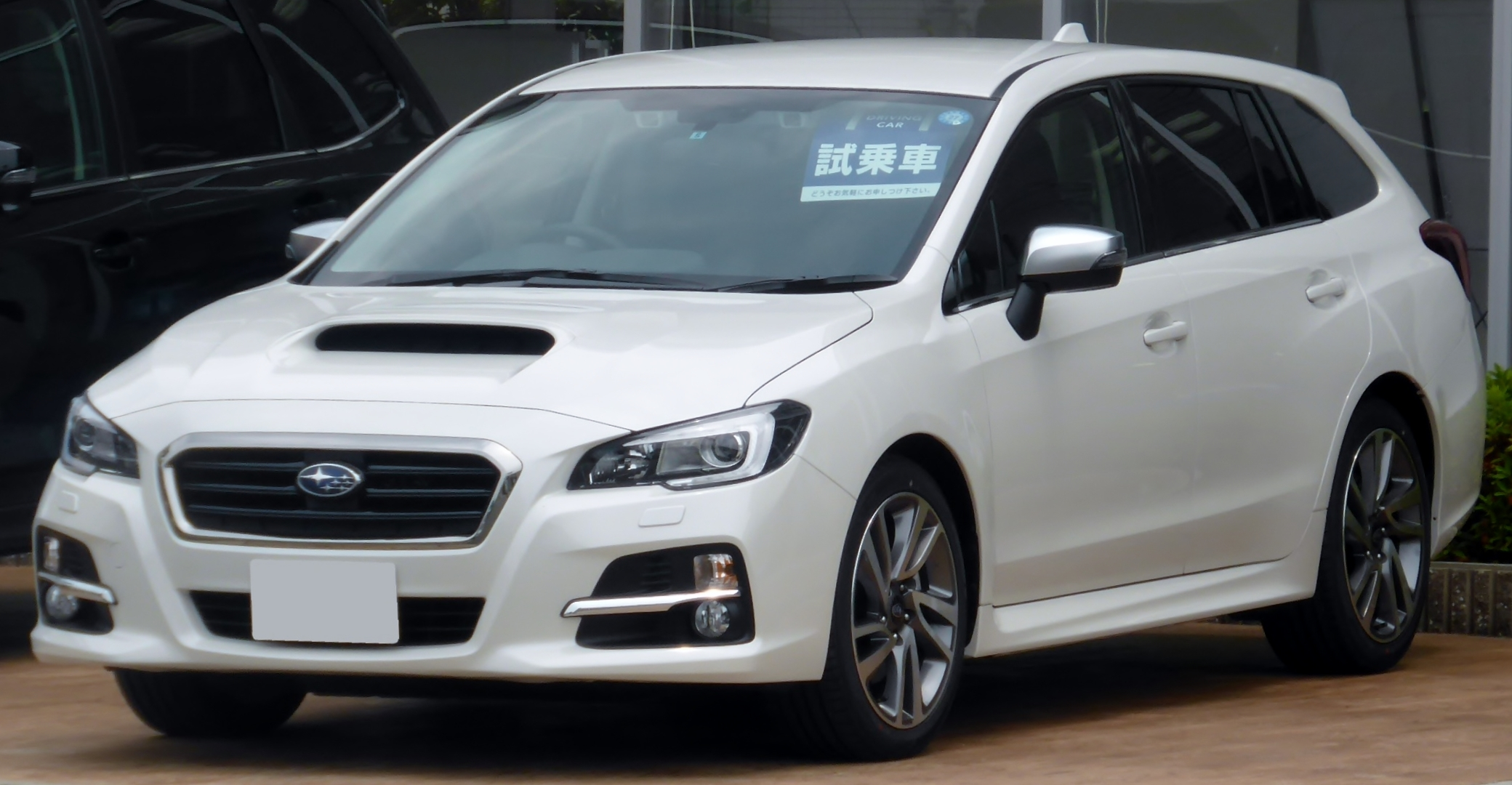
- Pre-facelift

Overview
- Model code: VM
- Production: 2014–2020

Body and chassis
- Related: Subaru Impreza (GJ/GP); Subaru XV/Crosstrek (GP); Subaru WRX (VA)

Powertrain
- Engine: petrol: 1.6 L FB16 turbo H4; 2.0 L FA20 turbo H4; 2.0 L FB20 H4
- Power output: 125 kW (170 PS; 168 hp) (FB16); 110 kW (150 PS; 148 hp) (FB20); 197 kW (268 PS; 264 hp) (FA20) Global; 221 kW (300 PS; 296 hp) (FA20) Japan
- Transmission: Lineartronic CVT

Dimensions
- Wheelbase: 2,650 mm (104.3 in)
- Length: 4,690 mm (184.6 in)
- Width: 1,780 mm (70.1 in)
- Height: 1,490 mm (58.7 in)
- Kerb weight: 1,520–1,580 kg (3,351–3,483 lb)

=== Specifications ===
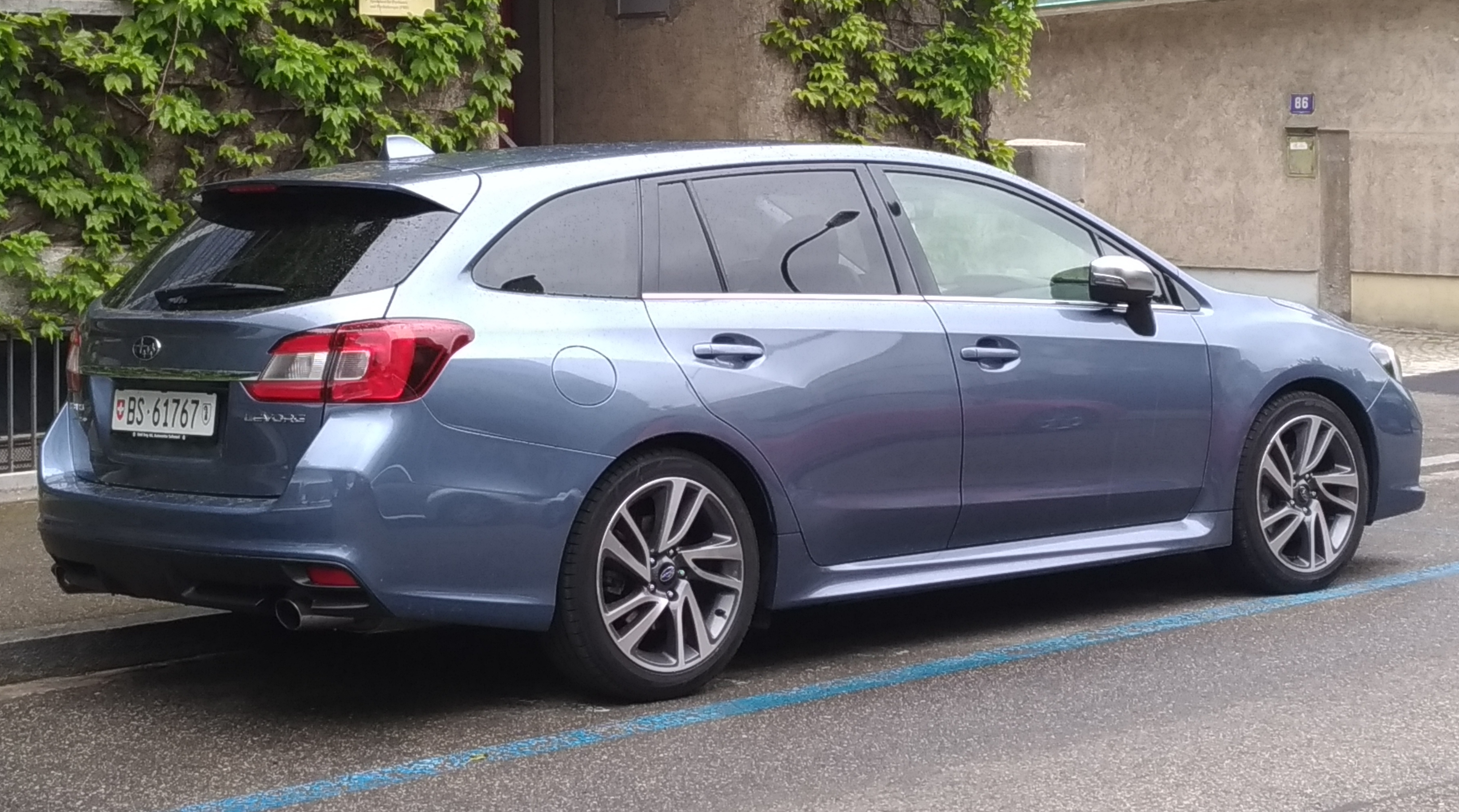
Rear (pre-facelift)

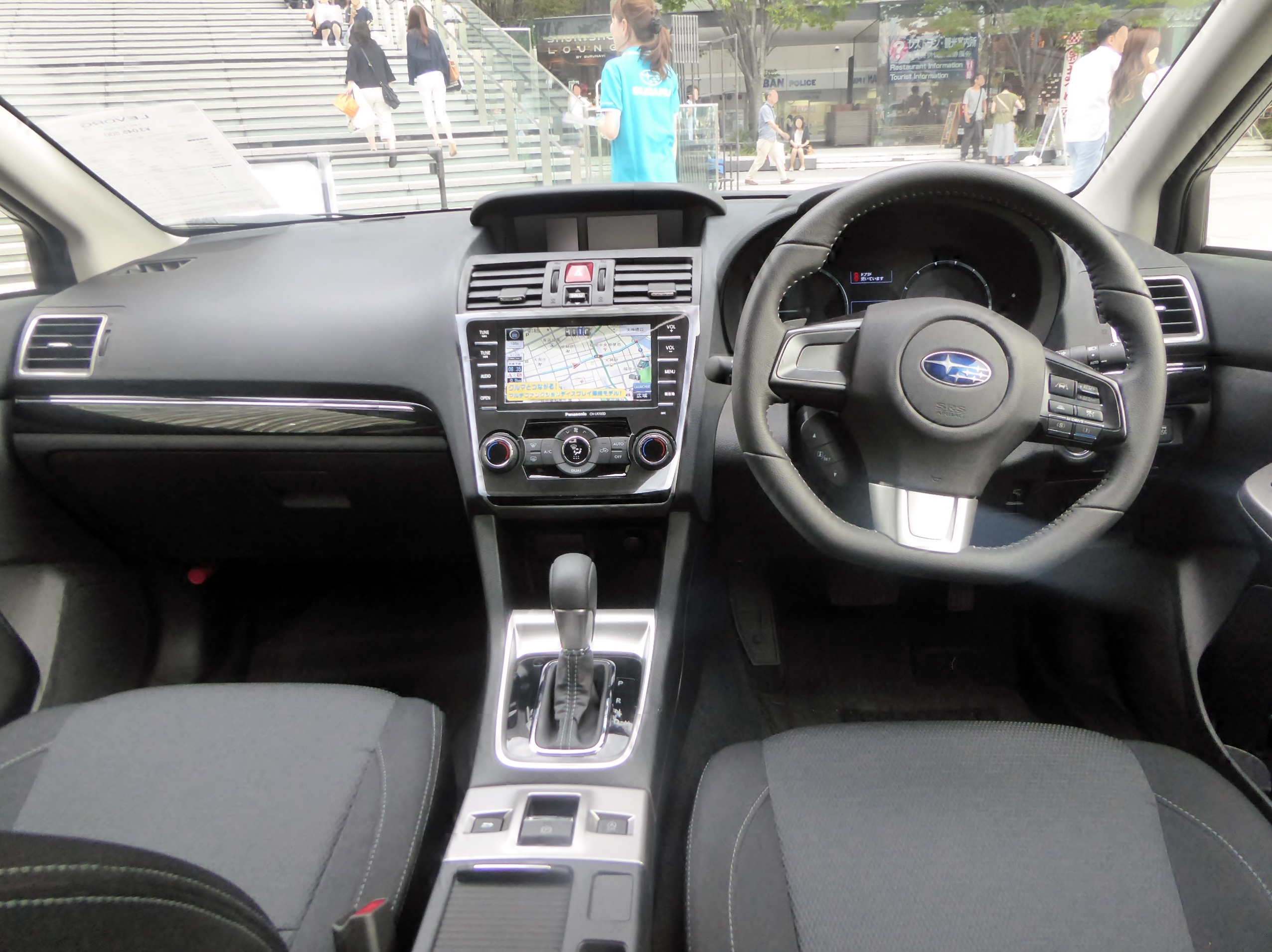
Interior (pre-facelift)

On the Japanese domestic market the Levorg is available with two DOHC flat-four petrol engines, both turbocharged, intercooled and direct injected: a 1.6-litre 170 PS (125 kW), 250 N⋅m (184 lb⋅ft) FB16 and the 2.0-litre 300 PS (221 kW), 400 N⋅m (295 lb⋅ft) FA20. The two are coupled to a Lineartronic continuously variable transmission and four-wheel-drive.

=== V-Sport ===
On 20 November 2019, Subaru launched the 2020 Subaru Levorg V-Sport. It features front sports seats with fabric upholstery, a leather wrapped steering wheel with silver stitching, as well as piano black and chrome trim. As with the variant it is based on, it sports Bilstein dampers, ventilated disc brakes and 225/45 R18 tires. V-Sport will be available in Japan and is priced at JPY 3,150,000.

=== Sales ===
During its advance sales before launch, Subaru received about 11,000 orders in three months, 2,000 short of its projection.

=== Facelift ===
In June 2017, the Levorg received a facelift. For the exterior, the design of the front grille, front bumper, LED headlamps, and LED fog lamp covers was revamped for all grades except the STI Sport.

In 2019, for the European market, the turbocharged 1.6-litre FB16 was phased out in favor of a naturally-aspirated 2.0-litre FB20B.

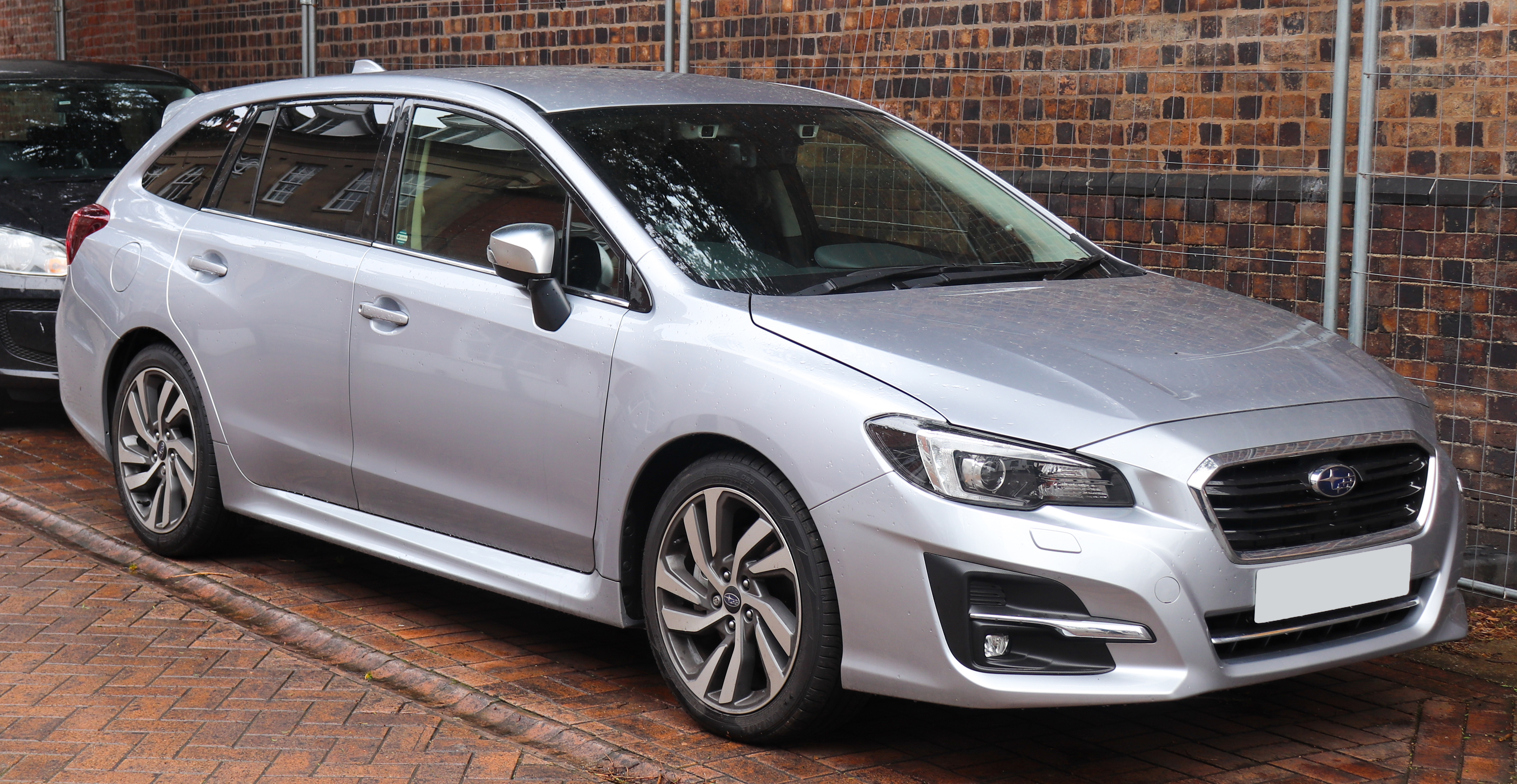
Facelift

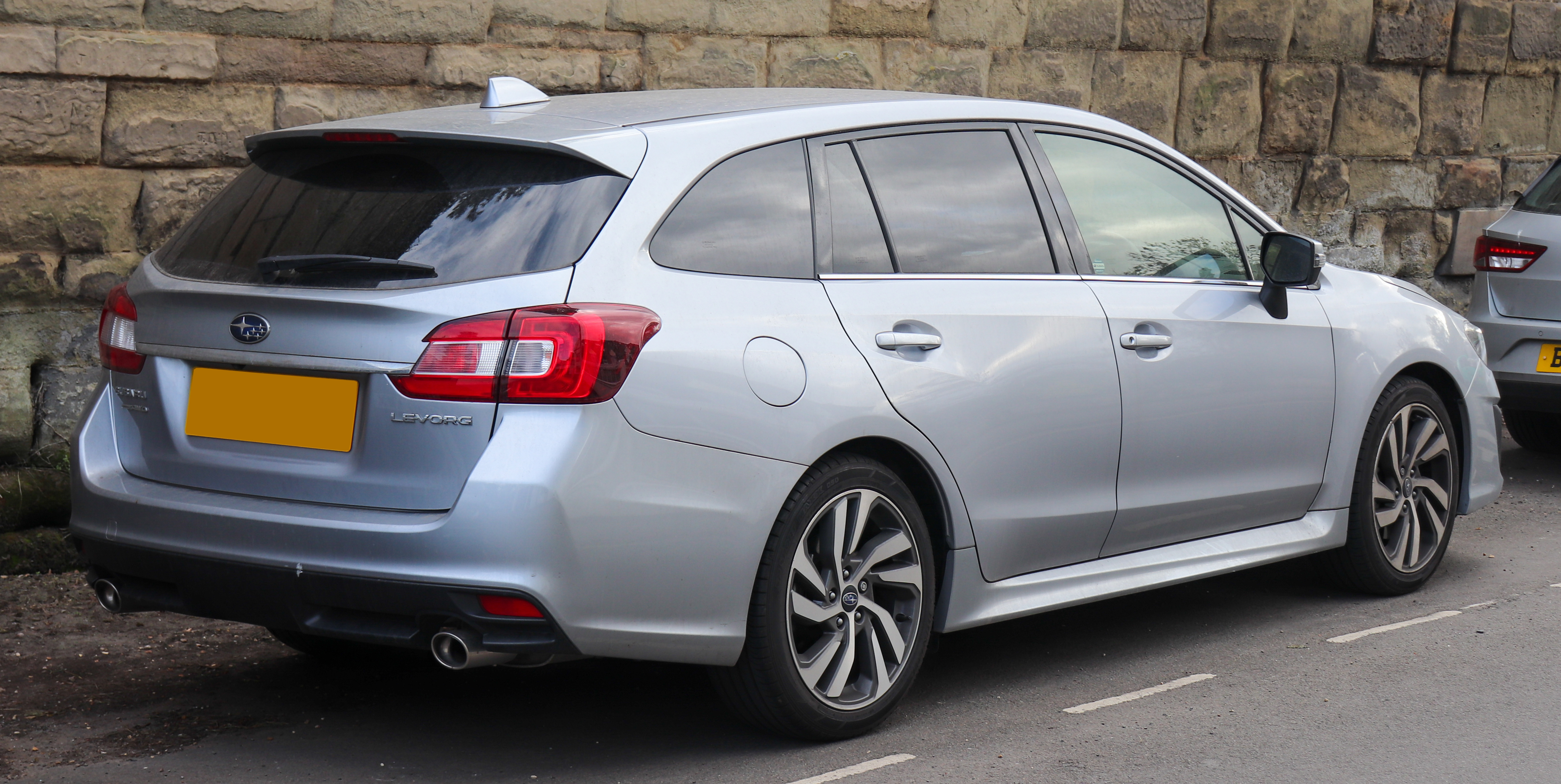
Rear view

=== Motorsport ===
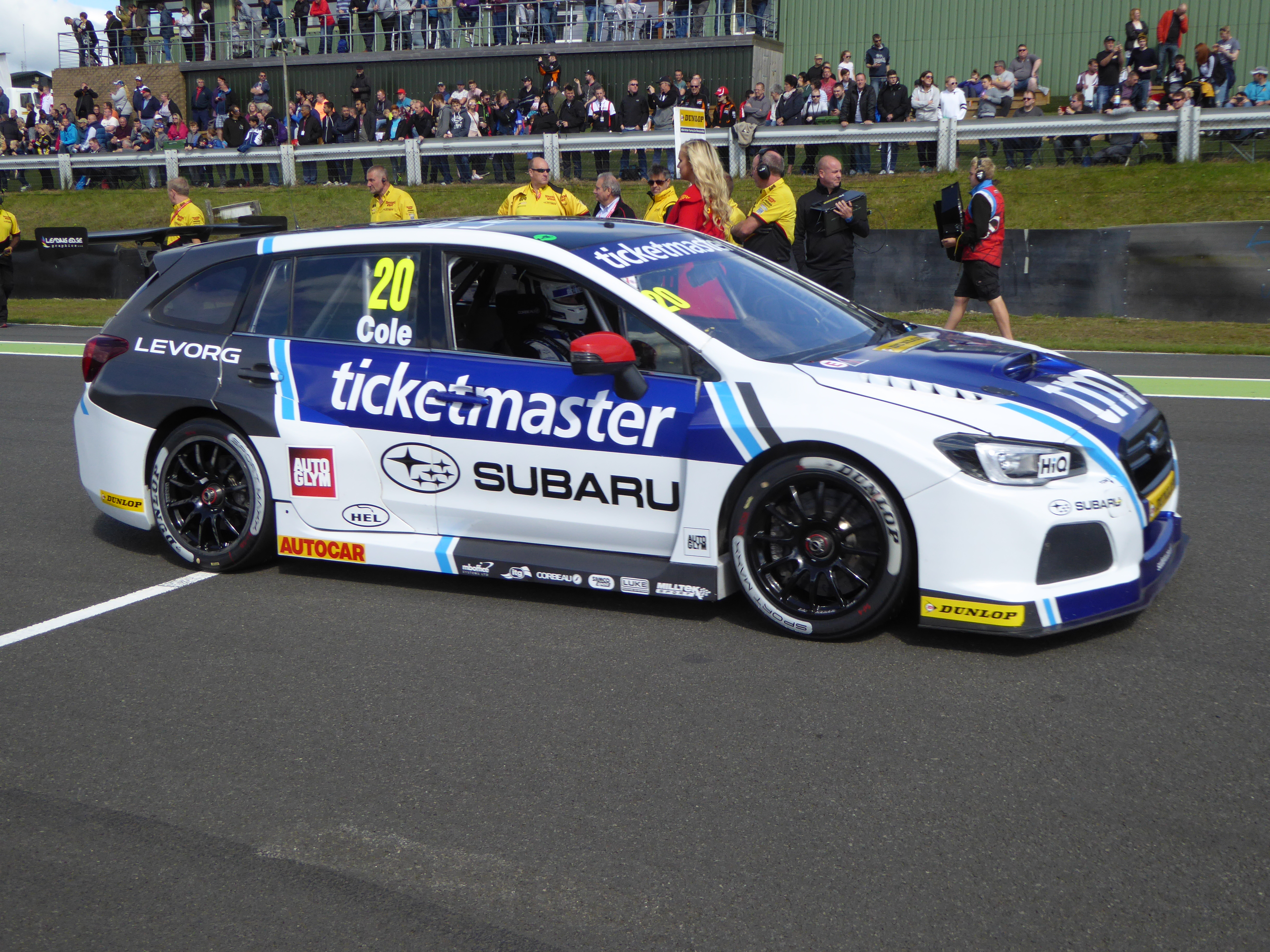
A Subaru Levorg, as campaigned by Team BMR in the 2017 British Touring Car Championship.

On 12 January 2016, Subaru announced that it was entering the British Touring Car Championship, as a manufacturer entry, in partnership with Team BMR. For the 2016 season, the team were preparing four Levorg Sports Tourers to the championship's Next Generation Touring Car specification. The BTCC Levorgs are configured as rear wheel drive rather than four wheel drive (which is disallowed by the championship's regulations). Former double champions Jason Plato and Colin Turkington piloted the cars, along with team owner Warren Scott. The marque's FA20 2.0 litre boxer engine was race prepared for the team by Mountune Racing.

The 2017 season saw some changes, including Ashley Sutton joining the team from MG Racing. Sutton went on to win the 2017 British Touring Car Championship for the team. Jason Plato continued driving the Levorg, but struggled to find pace throughout the season.

The 2018 season saw Team BMR switch from Mountune to Swindon as engine suppliers for the Levorg.

=== Safety ===
ANCAP test results* Subaru Levorg (2016)
Test	Score
Overall	5 /5 stars
Frontal offset	14.85/16
Side impact	16/16
Pole	2/2
Seat belt reminders	3/3
Whiplash protection	Good
Pedestrian protection	Good
Electronic stability control	Standard

== Second generation (VN; 2020) ==
Second generation
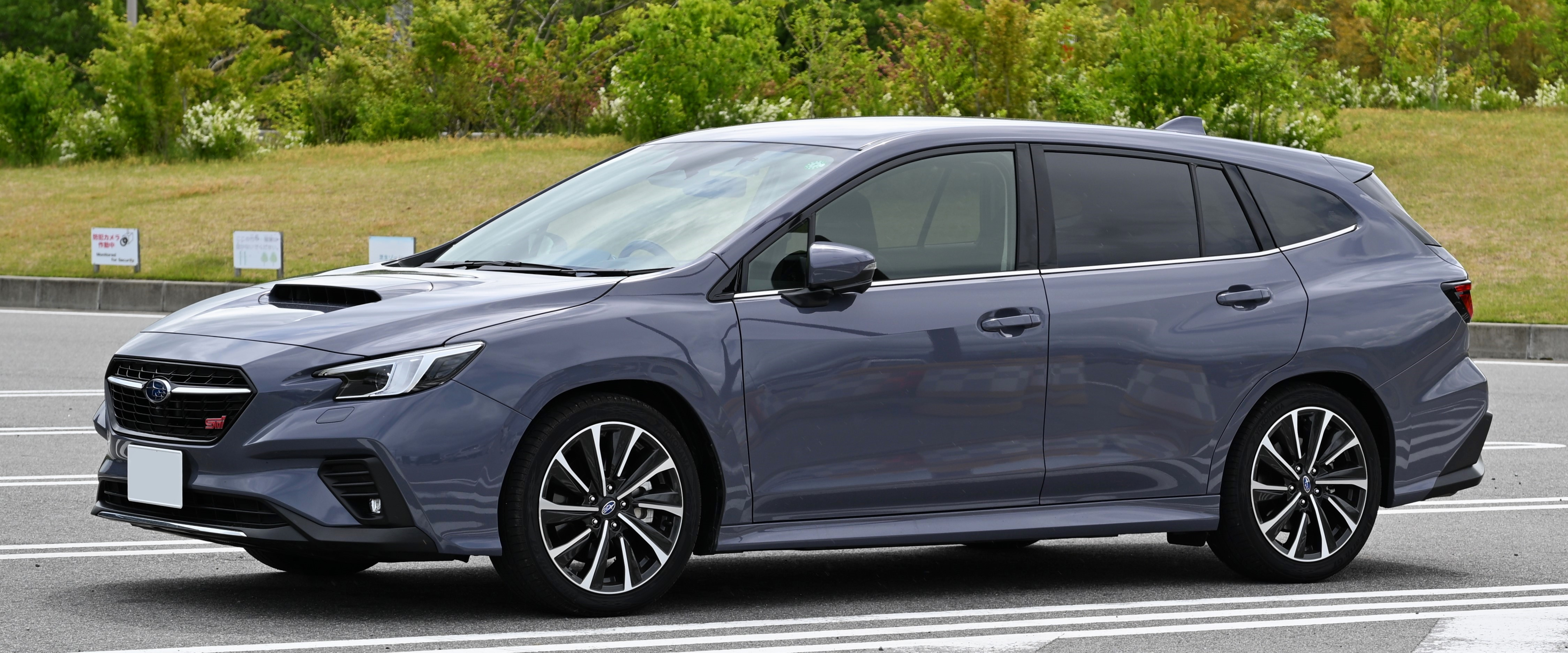
- Subaru Levorg STI Sport

Overview
- Model code: VN
- Also called: Subaru WRX Sportswagon (Australia); Subaru WRX GT (New Zealand); Subaru WRX wagon (international)
- Production: 2020–present

Body and chassis
- Platform: Subaru Global Platform
- Related: Subaru Impreza (GK/GT); Subaru XV/Crosstrek (GT); Subaru WRX (VB)

Powertrain
- Engine: Petrol: 1.8 L CB18 turbo H4; 2.4 L FA24F turbo H4; Petrol hybrid: 2.5 L FB25D e-Boxer H4 (S:HEV/Hybrid)
- Electric motor: 88 kW (118 hp; 120 PS) AC synchronous (S:HEV/Hybrid)
- Power output: 130 kW (177 PS; 174 hp) (CB18); 191 kW (260 PS; 256 hp) (FA24F)
- Transmission: Lineartronic CVT (1.8 L); Subaru Performance CVT (2.4 L); eCVT (S:HEV/Hybrid)
- Hybrid drivetrain: Power-split (S:HEV/Hybrid)
- Battery: 1.1 kWh (S:HEV/Hybrid)

Dimensions
- Wheelbase: 2,670 mm (105.1 in)
- Length: 4,755 mm (187.2 in); 4,770 mm (187.8 in) (Levorg Layback)
- Width: 1,795 mm (70.7 in); 1,820 mm (71.7 in) (Levorg Layback)
- Height: 1,500 mm (59.1 in) (with roof antenna); 1,570 mm (61.8 in) (Levorg Layback)
- Kerb weight: 1,550–1,580 kg (3,417–3,483 lb)

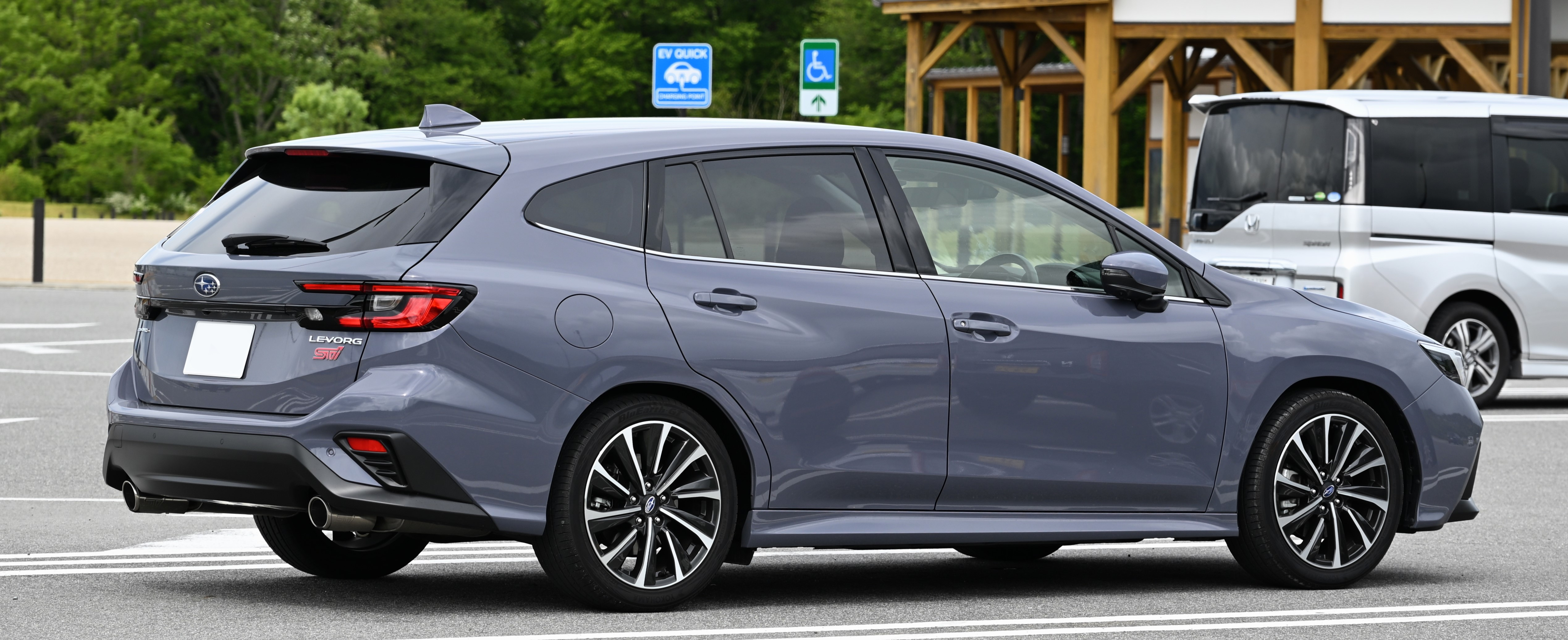
Rear view

Unveiled as a prototype at the 2019 Tokyo Motor Show on October 23, the second-generation model switched to the Subaru Global Platform, with a newly developed 1.8 L CB18 engine. Like the previous generation, this model would not be sold in North America, but would go on sale in Japan in the second half of 2020.

On 21 August 2020, the second-generation Levorg was released in Japan.

According to Subaru engine designer Tsuneaki Numamiyauchi, the displacement of the CB18 was chosen to balance an increase in maximum torque to 300 N⋅m (31 kg⋅m; 220 lb⋅ft) with improved fuel economy from adopting lean-burn technology. Fuel economy improved from 16.0 to 16.6 kilometres per litre (38 to 39 mpg_{‑US}) compared to the preceding generation's FB16 engine. In addition, the overall length of the engine was shortened by 44 mm (1.7 in), allowing for a larger crush zone for safety.

The second-generation Levorg is sold in Australia as the WRX Sportswagon and in New Zealand as the WRX GT ("Grand Touring"), leveraging the use of the WRX nameplate. For Australia and New Zealand, the Levorg is fitted with the larger FA24F 2.4-litre direct injection turbo engine. In November 2021 Subaru announced the FA24F-equipped Levorg also would be sold in the Japanese market, as the STI Sport R model.

=== Levorg Layback ===
A crossover SUV-inspired variant of the Levorg, named the Layback, went on sale in September 2023. It is available solely in the Limited EX trim powered with the CB18 engine.

The Layback is 15 mm (0.6 in) longer, 25 mm (1.0 in) wider, and 70 mm (2.8 in) higher than the regular Levorg. The ground clearance is increased to 200 mm (7.9 in). The tires and bumpers are designed to allow for a higher angle of attack to make it easier to drive through obstacles and improve drivability on rough roads such as mountain roads.

The S:HEV variant went on sale since July 2026. Features a slightly redesigned fascia design, redesigned headlights, and new 18" alumunium wheels. Powered by a 2.5 L FB25D e-Boxer engine. Just like the regular model, it is offered on sole EX variant.

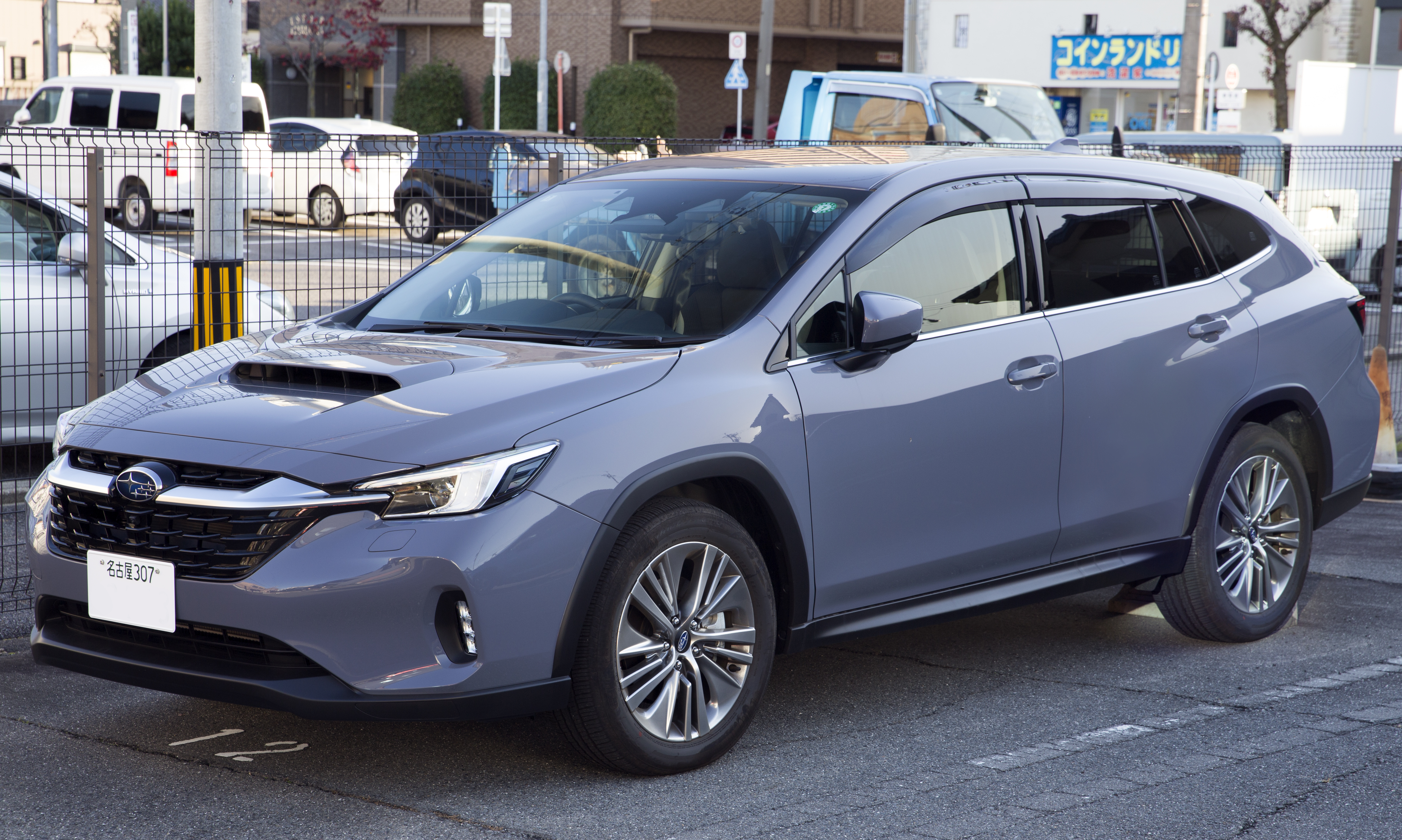
2024 Levorg Layback front view

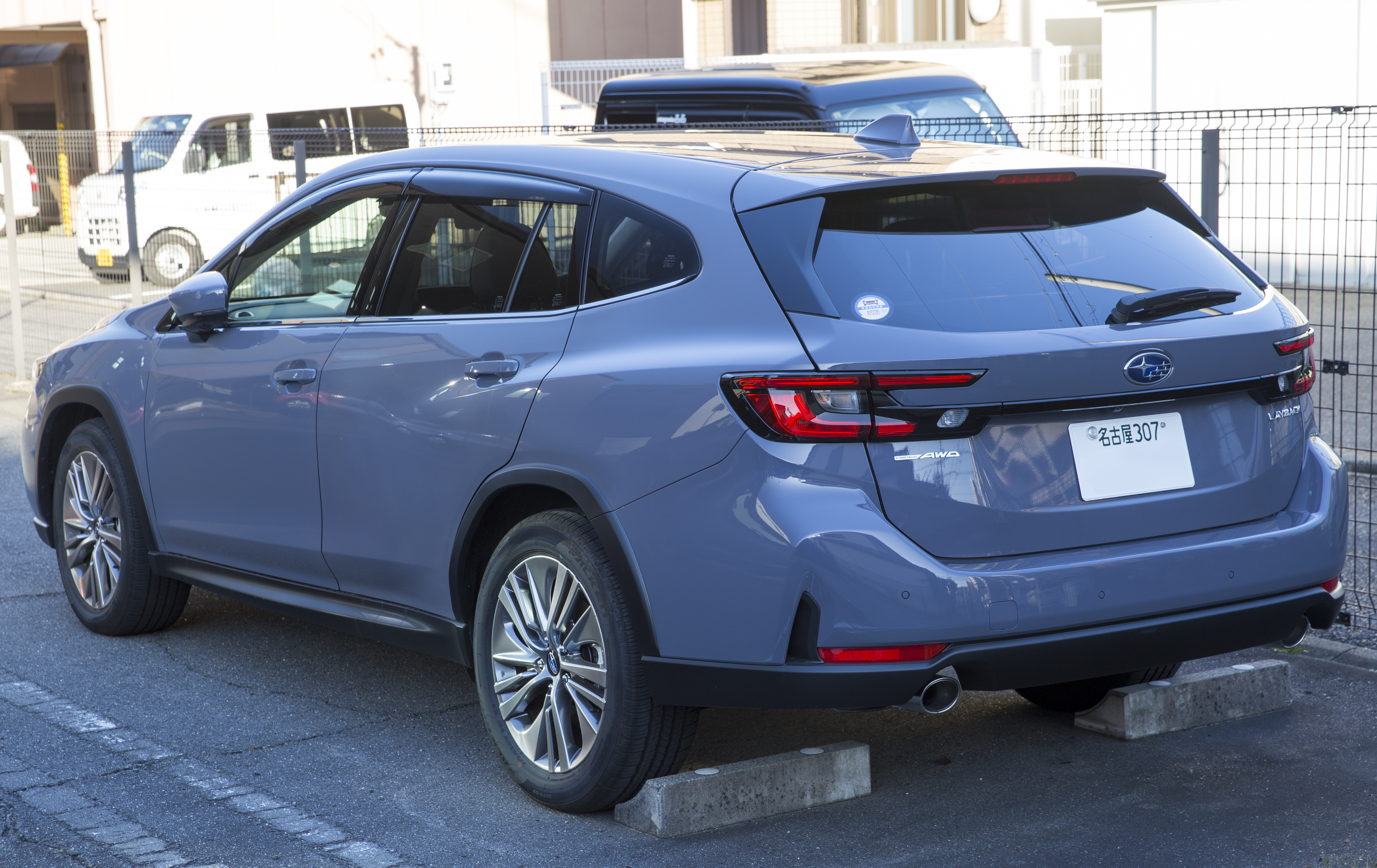
2024 Levorg Layback, rear view

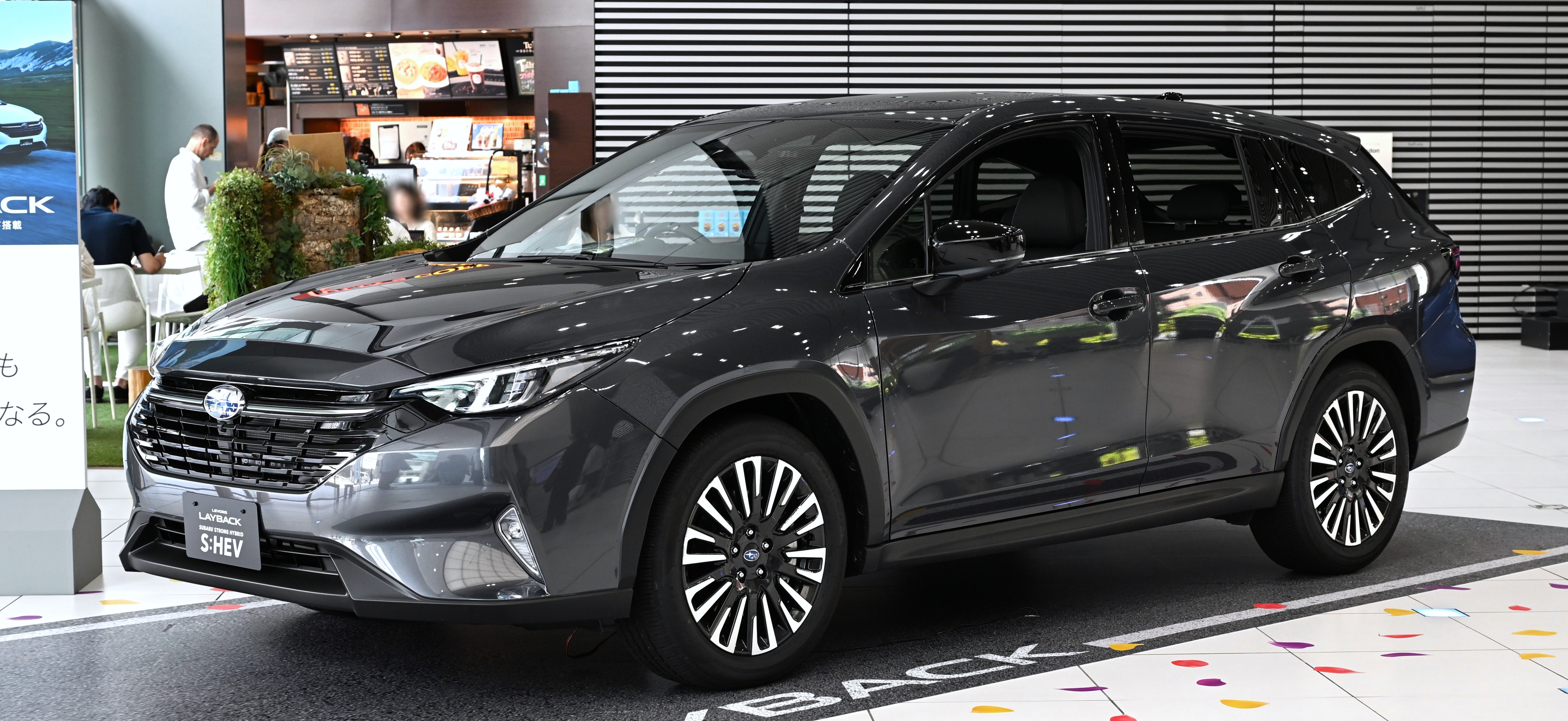
2026 Subaru Levorg Layback S:HEV

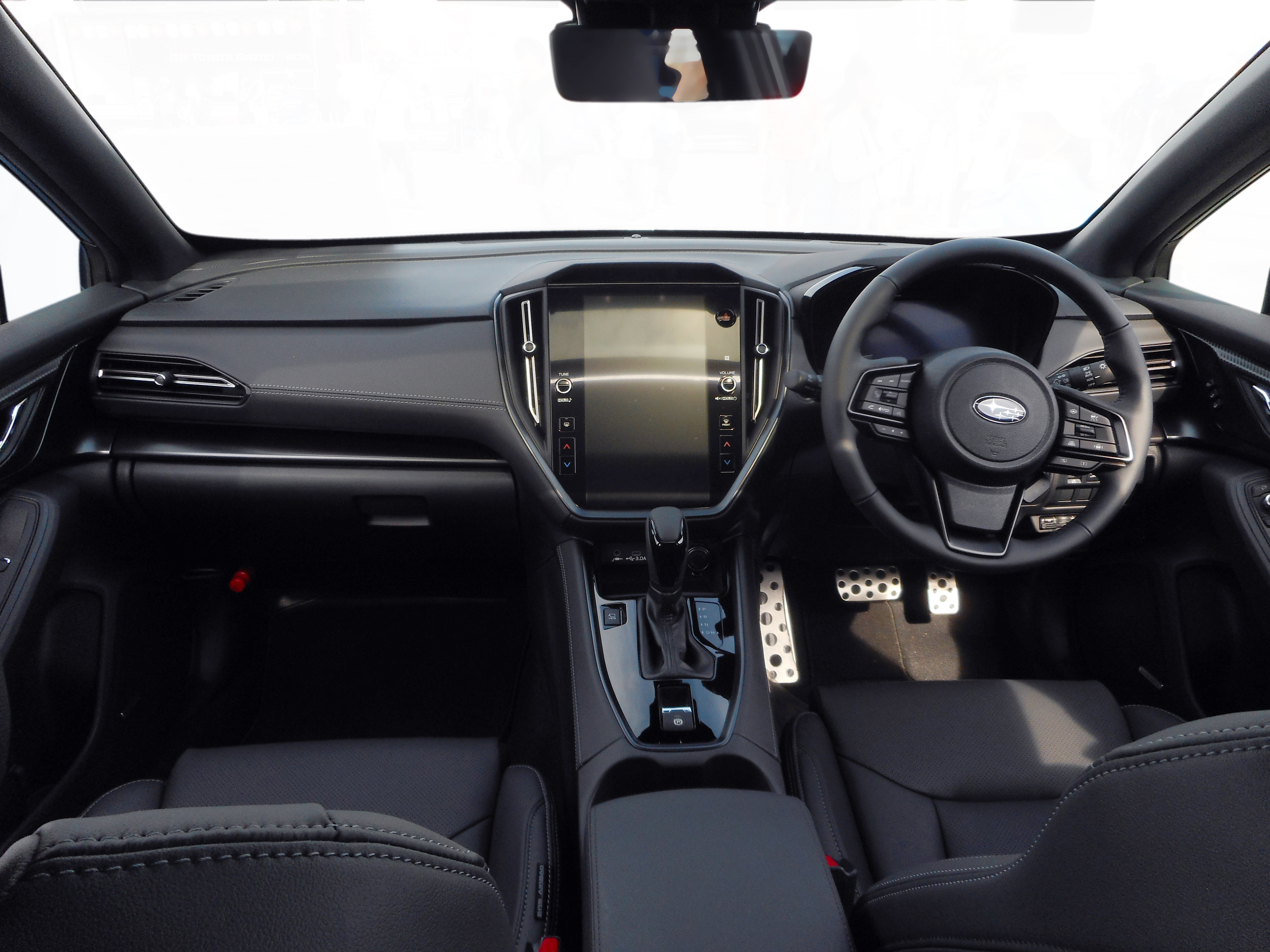
Interior (Layback)

=== Markets ===
==== Japan ====
The Levorg was released in Japan on 15 October 2020, with three trim levels at launch: GT, GT-H, and STi Sport. All three trim levels have the option of the Subaru EyeSight (EX) system. At release, all variants were powered by CB18 engine. At launch, more than 90% consumers chose the Eyesight package and Subaru planned to produce 2,200 units per month.

The STi Sport R trim was added in November 2021, it is powered with the FA24F engine and it is available with the Eyesight (EX) system.

The special edition Smart Edition model was introduced in July 2023 and was later replaced the GT trim.

==== Latin America ====
The WRX Wagon went on sale in Chile in July 2022 in a sole variant, in Colombia in August 2022 in a sole tS trim, and went on sale in Mexico on 13 April 2024 in a sole variant, known locally as WRX Sportswagon.

==== Oceania ====
===== Australia =====
The WRX Wagon went on sale in Australia on 7 April 2022 as the WRX Sportswagon, with three trim levels available: Standard, GT, and tS. Unlike the Sedan, the Sportswagon is only available with the Subaru Performance CVT. In March 2026, the entry-level Standard trim was discontinued for the Sportswagon.

===== New Zealand =====
The WRX Wagon was launched in New Zealand on 24 May 2022 as the WRX GT (Grand Touring), with two trim levels available: Premium and tS. The NZ-spec WRX GT Wagon is only available with the Subaru Performance CVT.

==== Southeast Asia ====
The WRX Wagon was launched in the Philippines on 8 June 2022 with two trim levels available: Standard and tS, in Thailand on 24 August 2022, in Malaysia on 7 December 2022 in a sole GT-S trim, in Singapore on 17 January 2023 in a sole GT-S trim, and in Indonesia on 16 February 2023 at the 30th Indonesia International Motor Show with two trim levels available: GT-S and tS.

==== Taiwan ====
The WRX Wagon went on sale in Taiwan on 20 March 2023, in a sole unnamed variant.

== Sales ==
Year	Japan	
Year	Levorg	Levorg Layback
2014	30,258	
2015	29,484	
2016	24,184	
2017	23,072	
2018	15,685	
2019	12,718	
2020	12,111	
2021	25,439	
2022	14,275	
2023	13,441	1,826
2024	10,284	12,463
