= 2009 British Formula Ford Championship =

Seasons
- ← 2008 2010 →

The 2009 British Formula Ford Championship was the 34th edition of the British Formula Ford Championship. It began on 13 April at Oulton Park's Easter Monday meeting and ended on 4 October at Castle Combe Circuit after 9 rounds and 25 races, all held in the United Kingdom. James Cole won the series, taking seven race victories with team Jamun Racing to finish 47 points ahead of Josef Newgarden in the final standings.

== Drivers and teams ==
Team	No	Driver	Class	Chassis	Rounds
(United Kingdom) Jamun Racing	2	(United Kingdom) James Cole	C	Mygale SJ09	All
(United Kingdom) Jamun Racing	3	(United Kingdom) Josh Hill	C	Mygale SJ09	All
(United Kingdom) Jamun Racing	4	(Republic of Ireland) Patrick McKenna	C	Mygale SJ09	All
(United Kingdom) Jamun Racing	99	(United Kingdom) Chrissy Palmer	C	Mygale SJ09	2, 5–9
(United Kingdom) Fluid Motorsport	5	(Brazil) Fabio Gamberini	S	Van Diemen LA07	All
(United Kingdom) Fluid Motorsport	6	(United Kingdom) Ben Barker	C	Van Diemen LA08	All
(United Kingdom) Fluid Motorsport	7	(United Kingdom) Garry Findlay	C	Van Diemen LA08	All
(United Kingdom) Fluid Motorsport	9	(Republic of Ireland) Peter Barrable	C	Van Diemen LA08	1–3
(United Kingdom) Fluid Motorsport	55	(United Kingdom) Rory Butcher	G	Van Diemen LA08	3
(United Kingdom) Fluid Motorsport	57	(United Kingdom) Gavin Halls	G	Van Diemen LA08	4
(United Kingdom) Kevin Mills Racing	10	(United Kingdom) Alex Jones	C	Spectrum 011C	All
(United Kingdom) Kevin Mills Racing	11	(United Kingdom) Daniel Cammish	S	Spectrum 011C	1–7, 9
(United Kingdom) Kevin Mills Racing	12	(Australia) Daniel Erickson	C	Spectrum 011C	All
(United Kingdom) DW Racing	13	(United Kingdom) Darelle Wilson	S	Ray GR 08	1
(United Kingdom) DW Racing	23	(United Kingdom) Josh Benson	S	Ray GRS 06/07	3–4
(United Kingdom) DW Racing	26	(United Kingdom) Greg Roffe	S	Ray GRS 06/07	7–9
(United Kingdom) DW Racing	36	(United Kingdom) Luke Williams	S	Ray GR 08	8
(United Kingdom) Raysport	14	(India) Zaamin Jaffer	S	Ray GR 08	All
(United Kingdom) Raysport	15	(United Kingdom) Tristan Mingay	S	Ray GR 08	6–9
(United Kingdom) GV Racing	16	(Spain) Jordi Cunill	C	Mygale SJ08	All
(United Kingdom) GV Racing	30	(United Kingdom) Josh Benson	S	Mygale SJ08	5–9
(United Kingdom) GV Racing	99	(United Kingdom) Chrissy Palmer	C	Mygale SJ09	3–4
(United Kingdom) JTR	17	(Netherlands) Liroy Stuart	C	Mygale SJ09	1–8
(United Kingdom) JTR	21	(United States) Josef Newgarden	C	Mygale SJ09	All
(United Kingdom) JTR	46	(United Kingdom) Jake Green	S	Mygale SJ09	7, 9
(United Kingdom) Minister International	19	(United Kingdom) Dan de Zille	C	Mygale SJ10	All
(United Kingdom) Enigma Motorsport	25	(United Kingdom) Jason Mills	S	Mygale SJ06/07	1–2
(United Kingdom) Enigma Motorsport	51	(France) Philippe Layac	G	Mygale SJ07	2, 5
(United Kingdom) Enigma Motorsport	58	(United Kingdom) Linton Stuteley	G	Mygale SJ07	9
(United Kingdom) Wrensport	28	(United Kingdom) Kieran Vernon	S	Spirit WL06	All
(United Kingdom) Williams Racing	36	(United Kingdom) Luke Williams	S	Ray GR 08	1–2, 4–5
(United Kingdom) InterMotorsport	44	(United Kingdom) Mark Harper	S	Van Diemen LA07	1–2, 4–8
(United Kingdom) InterMotorsport	54	(United Kingdom) Marcus Weller	G	Van Diemen LA07	2, 4
Privateer	53	(United Kingdom) Richard Huddart	G	Ray GR 06/07	3–4
Privateer	56	(United Kingdom) Joe Tanner	G	Aquila FD08	3
(United Kingdom) Aquila Racing	58	(Brazil) Nicolas Costa	G	Aquila FD1 09	4
(Finland) LMS Racing	77	(Finland) Antti Buri	S	MTEC FD09	1–2, 4–7
(United Kingdom) Getem Racing	88	(Netherlands) Rogier de Wit	C	Mygale SJ07	All
(United Kingdom) Getem Racing	89	(United Kingdom) Jason Down	C	Mygale SJ07	7
(United Kingdom) Juno	59	(United Kingdom) Felix Fisher	G	Juno JA08	7–9
(United Kingdom) Juno	99	(United Kingdom) Chrissy Palmer	C	Juno JA09	1

Icon	Class
C	Championship
S	Scholarship
G	Guest

== Race calendar and results ==
All races held in United Kingdom.

Round		Circuit	Date	Pole position	Fastest lap	Winning driver	Winning team
1	R1	Oulton Park	11 April	(United Kingdom) James Cole	(United Kingdom) James Cole	(United Kingdom) James Cole	(United Kingdom) Jamun Racing
1	R2	Oulton Park	13 April	(United Kingdom) James Cole	(United Kingdom) Garry Findlay	(United Kingdom) James Cole	(United Kingdom) Jamun Racing
1	R3	Oulton Park	13 April		(United Kingdom) Garry Findlay	(United States) Josef Newgarden	(United Kingdom) Joe Tandy Racing
2	R1	Rockingham Motor Speedway	30 May	(United Kingdom) Daniel Cammish	(United Kingdom) James Cole	(United States) Josef Newgarden	(United Kingdom) Joe Tandy Racing
2	R2	Rockingham Motor Speedway	31 May	(United Kingdom) James Cole	(United States) Josef Newgarden	(United Kingdom) James Cole	(United Kingdom) Jamun Racing
2	R3	Rockingham Motor Speedway	31 May		(Netherlands) Rogier de Wit	(United Kingdom) James Cole	(United Kingdom) Jamun Racing
3	R1	Knockhill Racing Circuit	13 June	(United Kingdom) Ben Barker	(United Kingdom) Garry Findlay	(United Kingdom) Ben Barker	(United Kingdom) Fluid Motorsport
3	R2	Knockhill Racing Circuit	14 June	(United Kingdom) Alex Jones	(United States) Josef Newgarden	(United Kingdom) Garry Findlay	(United Kingdom) Fluid Motorsport
3	R3	Knockhill Racing Circuit	14 June		(Australia) Daniel Erickson	(United Kingdom) Chrissy Palmer	(United Kingdom) GV Racing
4	R1	Snetterton Motor Racing Circuit	4 July	(United States) Josef Newgarden	(United States) Josef Newgarden	(United States) Josef Newgarden	(United Kingdom) Joe Tandy Racing
4	R2	Snetterton Motor Racing Circuit	5 July	(United States) Josef Newgarden	(United Kingdom) James Cole	(United States) Josef Newgarden	(United Kingdom) Joe Tandy Racing
4	R3	Snetterton Motor Racing Circuit	5 July		(United Kingdom) James Cole	(Spain) Jordi Cunill	(United Kingdom) GV Racing
5	R1	Donington Park	18 July	(Australia) Daniel Erickson	(United States) Josef Newgarden	(Australia) Daniel Erickson	(United Kingdom) Kevin Mills Racing
5	R2	Donington Park	19 July	(Australia) Daniel Erickson	(United States) Josef Newgarden	(United States) Josef Newgarden	(United Kingdom) Joe Tandy Racing
5	R3	Donington Park	19 July		(United Kingdom) Ben Barker	(United Kingdom) Chrissy Palmer	(United Kingdom) Jamun Racing
6	R1	Silverstone Circuit	15 August	(Australia) Daniel Erickson	(Republic of Ireland) Patrick McKenna	(United Kingdom) Chrissy Palmer	(United Kingdom) Jamun Racing/Sterling Motorsport
6	R2	Silverstone Circuit	16 August	(United States) Josef Newgarden	(Republic of Ireland) Patrick McKenna	(United States) Josef Newgarden	(United Kingdom) Joe Tandy Racing
6	R3	Silverstone Circuit	16 August		(United Kingdom) James Cole	(United Kingdom) James Cole	(United Kingdom) Jamun Racing
7	R1	Brands Hatch Indy	5 September	(United States) Josef Newgarden	(United Kingdom) James Cole	(United States) Josef Newgarden	(United Kingdom) Joe Tandy Racing
7	R2	Brands Hatch Indy	6 September	(United Kingdom) James Cole	(United Kingdom) Josh Hill	(United States) Josef Newgarden	(United Kingdom) Joe Tandy Racing
7	R3	Brands Hatch Indy	6 September		(United Kingdom) Josh Hill	(United Kingdom) James Cole	(United Kingdom) Jamun Racing
8	R1	Brands Hatch GP	20 September	(United Kingdom) James Cole	(United Kingdom) Garry Findlay	(United Kingdom) James Cole	(United Kingdom) Jamun Racing
8	R2	Brands Hatch GP	20 September	(United States) Josef Newgarden	(United States) Josef Newgarden	(United States) Josef Newgarden	(United Kingdom) Joe Tandy Racing
9	R1	Castle Combe Circuit	3 October	(United Kingdom) Chrissy Palmer	(United States) Josef Newgarden	(United Kingdom) Chrissy Palmer	(United Kingdom) Jamun Racing/Sterling Motorsport
9	R2	Castle Combe Circuit	3 October	(United Kingdom) Chrissy Palmer	(United Kingdom) Chrissy Palmer	(United Kingdom) Chrissy Palmer	(United Kingdom) Jamun Racing/Sterling Motorsport

== Championship standings ==
Points are awarded to the drivers as follows:

Position	1	2	3	4	5	6	7	8	9	10	11	12	13	14	15	PP/FL
Points	30	27	25	22	20	18	16	14	12	10	8	6	4	2	1	1

Best 23 scores must be dropped towards the championship.

- T. Pts – points if all races counted.
- Drop – two dropped scores.
- Pts – best 23 scores.
- S. Pts – Scholarship championship points, best 23 scores.

=== Championship Class ===
Pos	Driver	OUL			ROC			KNO			SNE			DON			SIL			BHI			BHGP		CAS		Total	Drop	Pts
1	(United Kingdom) James Cole	1	1	2	2	1	1	5	3	6	2	2	4	DNS	2	5	4	5	1	3	2	1	1	5	4	9	609	12	597
2	(United States) Josef Newgarden	Ret	3	1	1	5	3	14	5	5	1	1	3	2	1	2	Ret	1	16	1	1	5	DSQ	1	2	2	550		550
3	(United Kingdom) Garry Findlay	2	2	3	3	4	4	6	1	2	4	5	5	DNS	4	4	3	4	Ret	Ret	3	2	4	8	Ret	3	493		493
4	(United Kingdom) Chrissy Palmer	5	8	10	6	6	5	4	9	1	5	6	2	5	6	1	1	Ret	3	5	6	7	Ret	7	1	1	485		485
5	(Australia) Daniel Erickson	10	9	9	7	7	8	DSQ	2	Ret	3	8	12	1	3	6	5	2	6	4	5	10	Ret	3	7	4	410		410
6	(United Kingdom) Daniel Cammish	3	4	4	4	3	6	2	6	4	6	4	6	4	9	8	9	6	7	12	11	12			Ret	7	388		388
7	(Netherlands) Rogier de Wit	7	5	5	5	2	2	8	Ret	10	Ret	12	Ret	15	13	9	16	7	4	2	4	4	3	2	Ret	10	353		353
8	(United Kingdom) Ben Barker	6	Ret	12	Ret	Ret	10	1	DNS	9	14	20	9	6	5	11	18	9	5	9	7	Ret	5	10	6	5	272		272
9	(Netherlands) Liroy Stuart	4	6	6	9	10	13	10	14	11	9	9	8	11	Ret	10	13	13	8	6	Ret	6	2	4			271		271
10	(Republic of Ireland) Patrick McKenna	11	Ret	13	11	Ret	14	7	4	Ret	7	3	7	13	16	3	2	3	2	7	Ret	Ret	Ret	6	Ret	12	270		270
11	(United Kingdom) Josh Hill	Ret	7	8	Ret	9	7	9	8	7	Ret	13	15	8	17	7	10	11	Ret	Ret	Ret	3	6	9	3	6	257		257
12	(Spain) Jordi Cunill	Ret	Ret	DNS	10	8	9	3	Ret	3	8	7	1	7	7	12	8	18	11	10	Ret	DNS	7	16	11	11	253		253
13	(United Kingdom) Alex Jones	12	Ret	Ret	8	11	12	Ret	Ret	8	Ret	10	10	3	10	13	6	8	Ret	8	Ret	Ret	9	12	Ret	8	188		188
14	(United Kingdom) Kieran Vernon	9	10	11	12	12	16	13	7	Ret	15	14	11	9	18	16	11	14	18	20	8	Ret	11	15	9	16	149		149
15	(Brazil) Fabio Gamberini	Ret	Ret	14	14	13	11	12	Ret	Ret	10	15	13	10	8	14	12	10	10	16	13	8	10	14	Ret	18	132		132
16	(United Kingdom) Josh Benson							17	11	15	17	Ret	Ret	Ret	11	15	7	12	12	Ret	9	9	8	13	8	13	119		119
17	(United Kingdom) Dan de Zille	14	14	16	21	20	20	15	Ret	Ret	Ret	21	16	12	12	19	Ret	15	9	11	12	Ret	Ret	Ret	10	17	71		71
18	(India) Zaamin Jaffer	16	11	Ret	22	19	Ret	18	12	14	19	17	19	14	Ret	17	15	17	14	14	Ret	16	12	17	12	Ret	58		58
19	(Republic of Ireland) Peter Barrable	8	12	7	15	15	19	19	15	13																	51		51
20	(Finland) Antti Buri	13	15	15	13	Ret	DNS				12	18	Ret	19	14	18	14	16	13	13	Ret	14					42		42
21	(United Kingdom) Luke Williams	17	16	Ret	19	16	21				13	19	14	16	Ret	Ret							13	Ret			21		21
22	(United Kingdom) Mark Harper	19	17	18	20	21	Ret				Ret	22	20	18	Ret	Ret	Ret	19	15	17	16	17	16	Ret			18		18
23	(United Kingdom) Tristan Mingay																17	20	17	19	17	15	15	18	Ret	19	13		13
24	(United Kingdom) Jake Green																			15	14	13			Ret	14	13		13
25	(United Kingdom) Jason Mills	15	13	17	18	17	18																				8		8
26	(United Kingdom) Greg Roffe																			21	18	18	Ret	DNS	DNS	20	4		4
27	(United Kingdom) Darelle Wilson	18	Ret	Ret																							1		1
Guest drivers ineligible for points
	(United Kingdom) Felix Fisher																			Ret	10	11	Ret	DNS	5	15	0		0
	(United Kingdom) Joe Tanner							16	10	12																	0		0
	(United Kingdom) Rory Butcher							11	Ret	16																	0		0
	(United Kingdom) Gavin Halls										11	11	17														0		0
	(United Kingdom) Linton Stuteley																						14	11			0		0
	(United Kingdom) Richard Huddart							Ret	13	17	Ret	Ret	Ret														0		0
	(France) Philippe Layac				16	14	15							17	15	20											0		0
	(United Kingdom) Jason Down																			18	15	Ret					0		0
	(Brazil) Nicolas Costa										16	DNS	DNS														0		0
	(United Kingdom) Marcus Weller				17	18	17				18	16	18														0		0
Pos	Driver	OUL			ROC			KNO			SNE			DON			SIL			BHI			BHGP		CAS		Total	Drop	Pts

Colour	Result
Gold	Winner
Silver	Second place
Bronze	Third place
Green	Points classification
Blue	Non-points classification
Blue	Non-classified finish (NC)
Purple	Retired, not classified (Ret)
Red	Did not qualify (DNQ)
Red	Did not pre-qualify (DNPQ)
Black	Disqualified (DSQ)
White	Did not start (DNS)
White	Withdrew (WD)
White	Race cancelled (C)
Blank	Did not practice (DNP)
Blank	Did not arrive (DNA)
Blank	Excluded (EX)

=== Scholarship Class ===
Pos	Driver	OUL			ROC			KNO			SNE			DON			SIL			BHI			BHGP		CAS		Pts
1	(United Kingdom) Daniel Cammish	3	4	4	4	3	6	2	6	4	6	4	6	4	9	8	9	6	7	12	11	12			Ret	7	645
2	(United Kingdom) Kieran Vernon	9	10	11	12	12	16	14	7	Ret	15	14	11	9	18	16	11	14	18	20	8	Ret	11	15	9	16	561
3	(Brazil) Fabio Gamberini	Ret	Ret	14	14	13	11	13	Ret	Ret	10	15	13	10	8	14	12	10	10	16	13	8	10	14	Ret	18	510
4	(India) Zaamin Jaffer	16	11	Ret	22	19	Ret	19	12	14	19	17	19	14	Ret	17	15	17	14	14	Ret	16	12	17	12	Ret	410
5	(United Kingdom) Josh Benson							18	11	15	17	Ret	Ret	Ret	11	15	7	12	12	Ret	9	9	8	13	8	13	392
6	(United Kingdom) Dan de Zille	14	14	16	21	20	20	16	Ret	Ret	Ret	21	16	12	12	19	Ret	15	9	11	12	Ret	Ret	Ret	10	17	385
7	(United Kingdom) Mark Harper	18	17	18	20	21	Ret				Ret	22	20	18	Ret	Ret	Ret	19	15	17	16	17	16				228
8	(United Kingdom) Luke Williams	17	16	Ret	19	16	21				13	19	14	16	Ret	Ret							13				201
9	(United Kingdom) Tristan Mingay																17	20	17	19	17	15	15	18	Ret	19	138
10	(United Kingdom) Jason Mills	15	13	17	18	17	18																				88
11	(United Kingdom) Jake Green																			15	14	13			Ret	14	70
12	(United Kingdom) Greg Roffe																			21	18	18	Ret	DNS	DNS	20	52
13	(United Kingdom) Darelle Wilson	18	Ret	Ret																							16
Pos	Driver	OUL			ROC			KNO			SNE			DON			SIL			BHI			BHGP		CAS		Pts
