= 2010 British Formula Ford Championship =

Seasons
- ← 2009 2011 →

The 2010 British Formula Ford Championship was the 35th edition of the British Formula Ford Championship. It commenced on 5 April at Oulton Park's Easter Monday meeting and ended on 26 September at Brands Hatch after 10 rounds and 25 races, held in the United Kingdom and the Netherlands.

Jamun Racing continued their recent domination of the championship, with Scott Pye securing the team's sixth successive drivers' championship. From the 25 races held during the season, Pye won twelve of them, claiming four fastest laps as well as equalling 2007 champion Callum MacLeod's record of 17 pole positions in a season, including pole positions in the last nine races. Pye, who had moved to the UK championship having previously been a multiple race-winner in the Australian Formula Ford Championship, came on top after a season-long battle with Cliff Dempsey Racing's Scott Malvern. Malvern, who had previously been a part of the Jamun team working as a mechanic for 2008 runner-up Tim Blanchard, won only two races during the season but with 22 top-five finishes, he outscored Pye by a solitary point on total scores. This consistency would eventually cost Malvern as a driver's worst two scores had to be dropped per the championship regulations. Malvern had to drop 20 points from a twelfth-place finish at Knockhill – slowed after a collision with Pye's Jamun team-mate Josh Hill – and a tenth place at Donington Park, whereas Pye did not have to drop points due to three retirements over the season – via first-lap incidents at Oulton Park and Knockhill, and a clash with Malvern at Donington – meaning that Pye emerged as champion by 19 points.

Daniel Cammish took third place in the championship standings, having started the season in Kevin Mills Racing's Spectrum and ended it as a twice race-winner, at the wheel of one of JTR's trio of Mygales. His team-mate Tio Ellinas finished the season fourth in the standings, taking three victories in his first season of car racing, having been selected via the Grand Prix Shootout programme. Hill, son of 1996 Formula One world champion Damon Hill, completed the top five placings, just seven points behind Ellinas with five victories; Ellinas moving ahead of Hill after victory in the final round of the season at Brands Hatch. The only other driver to win a race was Danish driver Dennis Lind, who won one of the races at the overseas round at Zandvoort, in support of the Formula 3 Masters race. Lind also won the end-of-season, non-championship Formula Ford Festival race.

Tristan Mingay won the Scholarship Class championship for older machinery, beating his only other full-season rival Luke Williams by 76 points. Both drivers won the class on eleven occasions, but with more finishes, Mingay held a comfortable margin and duly claimed the title with a race to spare. The other Grand Prix Shootout winner, Dani Domit finished third in the championship, taking a double win at Zandvoort before leaving the championship after the following round at Castle Combe. David Ellesley took the other victory during the season, at Oulton Park. Despite being in his first season of car racing and so eligible to race in the Scholarship Class, Tio Ellinas opted not to do so. Had he done so, he would have won 21 of the 25 races.

Mygale held off Ray for the constructors' championship, Jamun Racing won the teams' championship comfortably, while Pye's results gave Australia the Nations Cup.

== Drivers and teams ==
Team	No	Driver	Class	Chassis	Rounds
(United Kingdom) Jamun Racing	0	(United Kingdom) Josh Hill	C	Mygale SJ10	All
(United Kingdom) Jamun Racing	1	(Australia) Scott Pye	C	Mygale SJ10	All
(United Kingdom) Jamun Racing	2	(Netherlands) Jeroen Slaghekke	C	Mygale SJ10	All
(United Kingdom) Jamun Racing	3	(Denmark) Emil Bernstorff	C	Mygale SJ10	All
(United Kingdom) Fluid Motorsport	5	(United Kingdom) Kieran Vernon	C	Van Diemen DP08	1
(United Kingdom) Fluid Motorsport	6	(United Kingdom) James Tucker	C	Van Diemen LA09	1–4
(United Kingdom) Fluid Motorsport	7	(Finland) Jesse Anttila	C	Van Diemen DP08	1–2, 4, 7
(United Kingdom) Fluid Motorsport	7	(Finland) Jesse Anttila	C	Van Diemen LA08	6
(United Kingdom) Fluid Motorsport	20	(Denmark) Dennis Lind	C	Van Diemen LA08	2–4
(United Kingdom) Fluid Motorsport	51	(United Kingdom) Garry Findlay	G	Van Diemen LA09	7
(United Kingdom) Fluid Motorsport	51	(United Kingdom) Garry Findlay	G	Van Diemen DP08	9
(United Kingdom) Fluid Motorsport	56	(South Africa) Ernie van der Walt	G	Van Diemen LA08	6
(United Kingdom) Fluid Motorsport	59	(United Kingdom) Andrew Richardson	G	Van Diemen DP08	9
(United Kingdom) Kevin Mills Racing	11	(United Kingdom) Daniel Cammish	C	Spectrum 012	1–2
(United Kingdom) Kevin Mills Racing	12	(Sweden) Milton Lundström	C	Spectrum 011C	2
(United Kingdom) Kevin Mills Racing	52	(United Kingdom) Marcus Allen	G	Spectrum 012	4
(South Africa) Brits Academy	13	(France) Philippe Layac	C	Ray GR 09	1–2
(United Kingdom) Antel Motorsport	13	(France) Philippe Layac	C	Ray GR 09	6–10
(United Kingdom) Juno (United Kingdom) Century Motorsport	15	(United Kingdom) Jake Green	C	Juno JA2010	1–2
(United Kingdom) Juno (United Kingdom) Century Motorsport	39	(United Kingdom) David Ellesley	C	Juno JA2010	3
(United Kingdom) Juno (United Kingdom) Century Motorsport	53	(United Kingdom) Chrissy Palmer	G	Juno JA2010	4
(United Kingdom) Juno (United Kingdom) Century Motorsport	54	(United Kingdom) Nathan Freke	G	Juno JA2010	5
(United Kingdom) Juno (United Kingdom) Century Motorsport	57	(United Kingdom) Chris Holmes	G	Juno JA2010	6
(United Kingdom) Juno (United Kingdom) Century Motorsport	58	(United Kingdom) Tom Bradshaw	G	Juno JA2010	7–8, 10
(United Kingdom) Luke Williams Racing	17	(United Kingdom) Luke Williams	S	Juno JA09	1–3, 6–10
(United Kingdom) Minister International	19	(United Kingdom) Dan de Zille	C	Mygale SJ10	All
(Republic of Ireland) Cliff Dempsey Racing	21	(Republic of Ireland) Cormac O'Neill	C	Ray GR 08	All
(Republic of Ireland) Cliff Dempsey Racing	22	(United Kingdom) Scott Malvern	C	Ray GR 10	All
(United Kingdom) DW Racing	23	(United Kingdom) Max McGuire	S	Ray GR 08	1–2
(United Kingdom) Ray Sport	24	(India) Zaamin Jaffer	C	Ray GR 10	All
(United Kingdom) Ray Sport	42	(United Kingdom) Tristan Mingay	S	Ray GR 09	1–3, 6–10
(United Kingdom) JTR	26	(United Kingdom) James Tucker	C	Mygale SJ09	5–10
(United Kingdom) JTR	27	(United Kingdom) Daniel Cammish	C	Mygale SJ09	3–10
(United Kingdom) JTR	28	(Cyprus) Tio Ellinas	C	Mygale SJ09	All
(United Kingdom) JTR	29	(Mexico) Dani Domit	S	Mygale SJ09	1–3
(United Kingdom) Harkesport	34	(United Kingdom) Adam Parsley	S	Mygale SJ09	1
(United Kingdom) Harkesport	43	(United Kingdom) Ashley Grant	S	Mygale SJ09	5
(United Kingdom) Harkesport	44	(United Kingdom) Mark Harper	C	Mygale SJ09	1, 4–5
(United Kingdom) Spirit Engineering	39	(United Kingdom) David Ellesley	S	Spirit WL07	1
(South Africa) Brits Academy (Denmark) Egebart Motorsport	48	(Denmark) Jesper Egebart	C	Ray GR 08	1–3, 7
(United Kingdom) Mark Bailey Racing	51	(United Kingdom) Garry Findlay	G	Spectrum 011C	2
(Netherlands) Geva Racing	55	(Netherlands) Pieter Schothorst	G	Mygale SJ10	6, 8, 10
(Netherlands) Geva Racing	61	(Netherlands) Pieter Schothorst	G	Mygale SJ10	3
(Netherlands) Geva Racing	67	(Netherlands) Jack Swinkels	G	Mygale SJ07	3
(Netherlands) Geva Racing	78	(Netherlands) Rogier Jongejans	G	Mygale SJ08	3
(United Kingdom) Enigma Motorsport (Finland) LMS Racing	57	(Finland) Antti Buri	C	Mygale SJ08	3–5
(United Kingdom) Enigma Motorsport (Finland) LMS Racing	77	(Finland) Antti Buri	C	Mygale SJ08	1–2, 6–10
(United Kingdom) Getem Racing	60	(United Kingdom) Jake Cook	C	Mygale SJ07	1–8
(Denmark) Vestergard Racing	63	(Denmark) Nils Vestergard	G	Mygale SJ07	3
(Finland) Team Söderman	63	(Finland) Sebastian Nummi	C	Van Diemen LA08	1
(Finland) Team Söderman	66	(Finland) Ville Kivinen	C	Van Diemen LA09	1
(Denmark) Fukamuni Racing	64	(Denmark) Christina Nielsen	G	Aquila FD01	3
(Denmark) Fukamuni Racing	71	(Denmark) Kean Kristensen	G	Aquila FD01	3
(Denmark) Fukamuni Racing	72	(Denmark) Martin Hanssen	G	Aquila FD01	3
(Netherlands) Provily Racing	65	(Netherlands) Michel Florie	G	Mygale SJ08	3
(Netherlands) Provily Racing	94	(Netherlands) Bas Schouten	G	Mygale SJ07	3
(Netherlands) Race2Win	66	(Netherlands) Jan Paul Van Dongen	G	Van Diemen DP06	3
(Netherlands) John's Racing	68	(Netherlands) Romain Desterq	G	Van Diemen DP07	3
Privateer	70	(Denmark) Niels Rytter	G	Ray GRS07	3
Privateer	76	(Denmark) Frank Mortensen	G	Ray GRS07	3
Privateer	77	(Denmark) Mikkel Johanssen	G	Van Diemen DP06	3

Icon	Class
C	Championship
S	Scholarship
G	Guest

== Race calendar and results ==
The series supported the British Formula 3 Championship/British GT Championship package at six rounds – Formula Three does not run at Knockhill – as well as supporting the British Touring Car Championship at Donington Park, the Deutsche Tourenwagen Masters at Brands Hatch and being part of the Masters of Formula 3 meeting at Zandvoort. Castle Combe was a stand-alone event for the series, held mid-season.

Round		Circuit	Date	Pole position	Fastest lap	Winning driver	Winning team
1	R1	(United Kingdom) Oulton Park	3 April	(Australia) Scott Pye	(Australia) Scott Pye	(Australia) Scott Pye	(United Kingdom) Jamun Racing
1	R2	(United Kingdom) Oulton Park	5 April	(Australia) Scott Pye	(Cyprus) Tio Ellinas	(United Kingdom) Scott Malvern	(Republic of Ireland) Cliff Dempsey Racing
1	R3	(United Kingdom) Oulton Park	5 April	(Australia) Scott Pye	(Australia) Scott Pye (United Kingdom) Scott Malvern	(Australia) Scott Pye	(United Kingdom) Jamun Racing
2	R1	(United Kingdom) Knockhill Racing Circuit	8 May	(United Kingdom) Scott Malvern	(United Kingdom) Scott Malvern	(United Kingdom) Josh Hill	(United Kingdom) Jamun Racing
2	R2	(United Kingdom) Knockhill Racing Circuit	9 May	(United Kingdom) Scott Malvern	(Australia) Scott Pye	(Australia) Scott Pye	(United Kingdom) Jamun Racing
2	R3	(United Kingdom) Knockhill Racing Circuit	9 May	(Australia) Scott Pye	(United Kingdom) Scott Malvern	(Australia) Scott Pye	(United Kingdom) Jamun Racing
3	R1	(Netherlands) Circuit Park Zandvoort	5 June	(United Kingdom) Josh Hill	(Finland) Antti Buri	(United Kingdom) Daniel Cammish	(United Kingdom) JTR
3	R2	(Netherlands) Circuit Park Zandvoort	6 June	(United Kingdom) Josh Hill	(Denmark) Dennis Lind	(Denmark) Dennis Lind	(United Kingdom) Fluid Motorsport
4	R1	(United Kingdom) Castle Combe Circuit	19 June	(Australia) Scott Pye	(Cyprus) Tio Ellinas	(Australia) Scott Pye	(United Kingdom) Jamun Racing
4	R2	(United Kingdom) Castle Combe Circuit	20 June	(Australia) Scott Pye	(Denmark) Emil Bernstorff	(Australia) Scott Pye	(United Kingdom) Jamun Racing
5	R1	(United Kingdom) Rockingham Motor Speedway	17 July	(Cyprus) Tio Ellinas	(Cyprus) Tio Ellinas	(Cyprus) Tio Ellinas	(United Kingdom) JTR
5	R2	(United Kingdom) Rockingham Motor Speedway	18 July	(Cyprus) Tio Ellinas	(Cyprus) Tio Ellinas	(Cyprus) Tio Ellinas	(United Kingdom) JTR
6	R1	(United Kingdom) Silverstone Circuit	14 August	(Australia) Scott Pye	(Denmark) Emil Bernstorff	(Australia) Scott Pye	(United Kingdom) Jamun Racing
6	R2	(United Kingdom) Silverstone Circuit	15 August	(Australia) Scott Pye	(United Kingdom) Scott Malvern	(United Kingdom) Scott Malvern	(Republic of Ireland) Cliff Dempsey Racing
6	R3	(United Kingdom) Silverstone Circuit	15 August	(United Kingdom) Josh Hill	(Denmark) Emil Bernstorff	(United Kingdom) Josh Hill	(United Kingdom) Jamun Racing
7	R1	(United Kingdom) Snetterton Motor Racing Circuit	29 August	(Denmark) Emil Bernstorff	(United Kingdom) Scott Malvern	(Australia) Scott Pye	(United Kingdom) Jamun Racing
7	R2	(United Kingdom) Snetterton Motor Racing Circuit	30 August	(Australia) Scott Pye	(Finland) Antti Buri	(Australia) Scott Pye	(United Kingdom) Jamun Racing
8	R1	(United Kingdom) Brands Hatch	4 September	(Australia) Scott Pye	(United Kingdom) Josh Hill	(Australia) Scott Pye	(United Kingdom) Jamun Racing
8	R2	(United Kingdom) Brands Hatch	5 September	(Australia) Scott Pye	(Denmark) Emil Bernstorff	(United Kingdom) Josh Hill	(United Kingdom) Jamun Racing
8	R3	(United Kingdom) Brands Hatch	5 September	(Australia) Scott Pye	(Denmark) Emil Bernstorff	(Australia) Scott Pye	(United Kingdom) Jamun Racing
9	R1	(United Kingdom) Donington Park	18 September	(Australia) Scott Pye	(United Kingdom) Daniel Cammish	(United Kingdom) Josh Hill	(United Kingdom) Jamun Racing
9	R2	(United Kingdom) Donington Park	19 September	(Australia) Scott Pye	(United Kingdom) Daniel Cammish	(United Kingdom) Josh Hill	(United Kingdom) Jamun Racing
9	R3	(United Kingdom) Donington Park	19 September	(Australia) Scott Pye	(United Kingdom) Dan de Zille	(United Kingdom) Daniel Cammish	(United Kingdom) JTR
10	R1	(United Kingdom) Brands Hatch	25 September	(Australia) Scott Pye	(United Kingdom) Josh Hill	(Australia) Scott Pye	(United Kingdom) Jamun Racing
10	R2	(United Kingdom) Brands Hatch	26 September	(Australia) Scott Pye	(Australia) Scott Pye	(Cyprus) Tio Ellinas	(United Kingdom) JTR

== Championship standings ==
In the Championship Class, points were awarded on a 30-27-24-22-20-18-16-14-12-10-8-6-4-3-2 basis to the top fifteen classified drivers, with one point awarded to all other finishers. In the Scholarship Class, points were awarded 30-27-24-22-20-18-16-14-12-10-8-6-4-2-1 basis. An additional point was given to the driver – with the exception of Oulton Park race three, where Scott Pye and Scott Malvern were each given a point after setting identical fastest laps – who set the fastest lap in each race, in both classes. Each driver's best 23 scores counted towards the championship both in the Championship class and the Scholarship class.

Pos	Driver	OUL (United Kingdom)			KNO (United Kingdom)			ZAN (Netherlands)		CAS (United Kingdom)		ROC (United Kingdom)		SIL (United Kingdom)			SNE (United Kingdom)		BRH (United Kingdom)			DON (United Kingdom)			BRH (United Kingdom)		Total	Drop	Pts
Championship Class
1	(Australia) Scott Pye	1	Ret	1	Ret	1	1	10	14	1	1	3	3	1	4	2	1	1	1	2	1	5	3	Ret	1	2	581		581
2	(United Kingdom) Scott Malvern	2	1	2	2	12	3	3	2	2	3	4	5	2	1	4	3	4	5	5	6	4	10	2	4	3	582	20	562
3	(United Kingdom) Daniel Cammish	3	4	9	3	Ret	6	1	5	Ret	4	6	4	4	3	5	2	5	6	9	7	2	9	1	8	4	486		486
4	(Cyprus) Tio Ellinas	4	8	Ret	18	2	7	28	12	5	5	1	1	7	5	6	5	3	7	7	8	3	2	Ret	3	1	451		451
5	(United Kingdom) Josh Hill	6	Ret	6	1	Ret	2	Ret	11	3	2	8	7	3	2	1	Ret	Ret	3	1	2	1	1	Ret	6	8	444		444
6	(Finland) Antti Buri	11	2	3	4	Ret	5	7	8	4	9	2	2	9	6	8	Ret	2	4	3	4	8	6	Ret	7	9	430		430
7	(Denmark) Emil Bernstorff	DNS	14	11	7	8	Ret	8	6	Ret	8	9	9	8	9	3	7	10	2	4	3	7	4	7	5	6	370		370
8	(United Kingdom) Dan de Zille	Ret	Ret	12	10	3	12	13	16	7	10	7	18	12	12	12	9	8	8	6	5	Ret	11	11	2	Ret	272		272
9	(Netherlands) Jeroen Slaghekke	12	Ret	15	11	10	Ret	5	7	11	7	10	12	10	13	10	Ret	16	12	10	9	12	8	3	9	5	255		255
10	(United Kingdom) Jake Cook	7	6	7	5	5	Ret	2	Ret	8	Ret	5	6	5	7	13	DNS	11	10	11	12						247		247
11	(United Kingdom) James Tucker	Ret	5	5	9	6	13	26	Ret	9	Ret	12	8	6	10	7	6	18	9	Ret	Ret	Ret	5	Ret	10	7	236		236
12	(Republic of Ireland) Cormac O'Neill	Ret	DNS	DNS	15	9	10	21	10	12	13	15	16	13	14	17	12	14	Ret	13	10	11	12	6	11	14	161		161
13	(Finland) Jesse Anttila	Ret	11	4	8	4	Ret			14	11			11	8	9	8	7									150		150
14	(France) Philippe Layac	10	9	Ret	13	7	11							17	Ret	16	Ret	12	11	Ret	11	10	Ret	4	12	11	135		135
15	(Denmark) Dennis Lind				6	Ret	4	4	1	6	6																129		129
16	(India) Zaamin Jaffer	Ret	15	Ret	17	Ret	15	17	17	16	Ret	13	14	DNS	Ret	Ret	10	Ret	Ret	Ret	14	9	Ret	5	15	13	101		101
17	(Denmark) Jesper Egebart	Ret	10	8	12	Ret	8	18	13								11	9									88		88
18	(United Kingdom) Kieran Vernon	5	3	Ret																							44		44
19	(United Kingdom) Jake Green	8	13	Ret	14	Ret	Ret																				23		23
20	(Finland) Sebastian Nummi	16	12	10																							22		22
21	(Sweden) Milton Lundström				16	Ret	9																				13		13
22	(United Kingdom) Mark Harper	Ret	Ret	17						Ret	Ret	16	15														11		11
23	(Finland) Ville Kivinen	13	Ret	13																							10		10
24	(United Kingdom) David Ellesley							23	18																		7		7
Guest drivers ineligible for points
	(Netherlands) Rogier Jongejans							6	3																		0		0
	(United Kingdom) Garry Findlay				Ret	Ret	Ret										4	6				6	7	Ret			0		0
	(Denmark) Nils Vestergard							9	4																		0		0
	(United Kingdom) Andrew Richardson																					13	13	8			0		0
	(United Kingdom) Tom Bradshaw																Ret	13	Ret	8	Ret				Ret	Ret	0		0
	(Netherlands) Pieter Schothorst							16	9					Ret	11	11			Ret	EX	EX				13	10	0		0
	(United Kingdom) Chrissy Palmer									10	Ret																0		0
	(United Kingdom) Nathan Freke											11	11														0		0
	(Netherlands) Michel Florie							11	19																		0		0
	(United Kingdom) Marcus Allen									17	12																0		0
	(Denmark) Kean Kristensen							12	20																		0		0
	(United Kingdom) Chris Holmes													14	17	18											0		0
	(South Africa) Ernie van der Walt													Ret	Ret	14											0		0
	(Denmark) Mikkel Johanssen							14	Ret																		0		0
	(Netherlands) Jack Swinkels							20	15																		0		0
	(Netherlands) Bas Schouten							15	22																		0		0
	(Netherlands) Jan Paul Van Dongen							19	24																		0		0
	(Denmark) Martin Hanssen							Ret	23																		0		0
	(Denmark) Niels Rytter							25	29																		0		0
	(Netherlands) Romain Desterq							29	26																		0		0
	(Denmark) Frank Mortensen							27	27																		0		0
	(Denmark) Christina Nielsen							Ret	28																		0		0
Scholarship Class
1	(United Kingdom) Tristan Mingay	Ret	DNS	DNS	20	11	16	Ret	25	13	14	14	10	16	16	15	13	17	Ret	DNS	DNS	14	14	10	14	12	526		
2	(United Kingdom) Luke Williams	9	7	Ret	8	Ret	14	24	Ret	Ret	15	Ret	13	13	15	Ret	Ret	15	13	12	13	Ret	15	9	Ret	DNS	450		
3	(Mexico) Dani Domit	14	Ret	Ret	19	Ret	17	22	21	15	Ret																168		
4	(United Kingdom) David Ellesley	15	16	14																							81		
5	(United Kingdom) Adam Parsley	17	17	18																							70		
6	(United Kingdom) Ashley Grant											17	17														51		
7	(United Kingdom) Max McGuire	Ret	Ret	16	Ret	Ret	18																				49		
Pos	Driver	OUL (United Kingdom)			KNO (United Kingdom)			ZAN (Netherlands)		CAS (United Kingdom)		ROC (United Kingdom)		SIL (United Kingdom)			SNE (United Kingdom)		BRH (United Kingdom)			DON (United Kingdom)			BRH (United Kingdom)		Pts		

=== Constructors ===
	Constructor	Points
1	Mygale	196
2	Ray	176
3	Juno	97
4	Van Diemen	91
5	Spectrum	36
6	Spirit	10

=== Teams ===
	Team	Points
1	(United Kingdom) Jamun Racing	1153
2	(Republic of Ireland) Cliff Dempsey Racing	993
3	(United Kingdom) Fluid Motorsport	527
4	(United Kingdom) Raysport	472
5	(United Kingdom) Minister International	408
6	(United Kingdom) Getem Racing	336
7	(United Kingdom) Century Motorsport	198
8	(United Kingdom) Kevin Mills Racing	162
9	(Finland) Team Söderman	72
10	(United Kingdom) DW Racing	16

=== Nations Cup ===
	Nation	Points
1	Australia	619
2	Denmark	581
3	Finland	562
4	Cyprus	552
5	Netherlands	460
6	Ireland	376
7	France	277
8	India	244
9	Mexico	90
10	Sweden	21
