= Scott Pye =

Australian professional racing driver (born 1990)

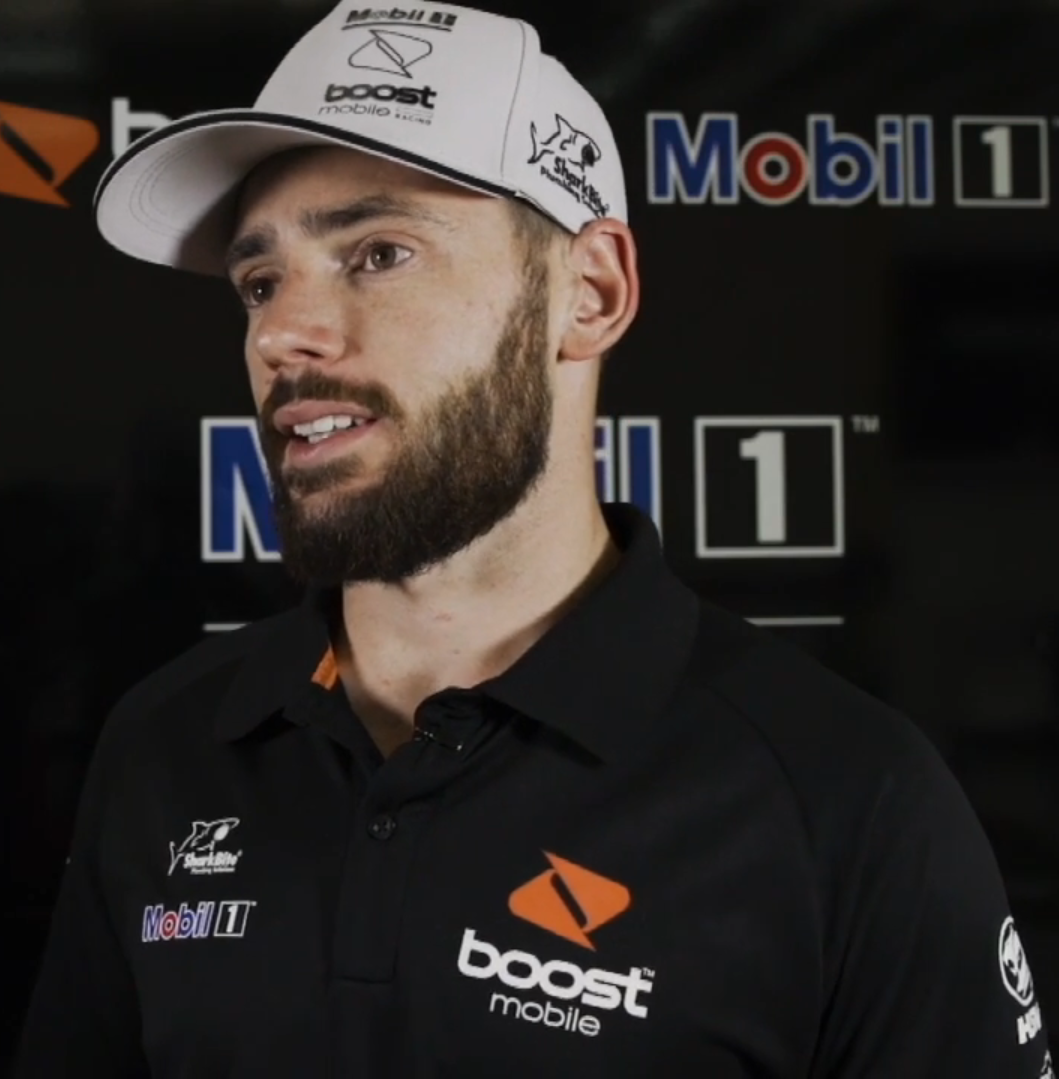
- Pye in 2018
- Nationality: Australian
- Born: Scott Andrew Pye; 8 January 1990 (age 36) Adelaide, South Australia
- Categorisation: FIA Gold

Supercars Championship career
- Current team: Triple Eight Race Engineering (Endurance race co-driver)
- Championships: 0
- Races: 344
- Wins: 2
- Podiums: 13
- Pole positions: 1

Scott Andrew Pye (born 8 January 1990) is an Australian professional racing driver who competes in the Repco Supercars Championship co-driving with Will Brown in the No. 888 Ford Mustang GT for Triple Eight Race Engineering.

== Racing career ==
=== Early days ===
Pye started out in push bikes with stabilisers on his 8th birthday when he received a bright yellow bike from his parents. He won six state championships and moved up to the Formula Ford level in 2007 when he raced in the State Series Formula Ford in Australia for Borland Racing Developments/ Cams Rising Star.

2008 saw Pye move up to the Australian Formula Ford Championship, again with Borland Racing Developments/ Cams Rising Star. He finished the championship in seventh place in 2008 and in third position in 2009.

=== International foray ===
Pye joined fellow Australian driver s in the European Technique team for the 2008–09 Toyota Racing Series in New Zealand. He achieved a podium finish in his first race at Ruapuna and completed the weekend with a win in the third race which saw him take home the Wigram Cup. Pye continued his good form in round two at Timaru International Motor Raceway when he won the final two races, earning him the round win.

For 2010, Pye moved to the United Kingdom to compete in the British Formula Ford Championship. Racing a Mygale for British team Jamun Racing, he won the championship with 12 race wins and 17 pole positions. He also finished second in the Formula Ford Festival in 2010.

Pye competed in the British Formula 3 Championship for 2011 with Double R. Pye's Mercedes-engined CampingF1 sponsored Dallara lapped the 2.7-mile Oulton Park International Circuit in 1m 27.621s, more than a second inside the 2010 pole position time set by eventual champion Jean-Éric Vergne. He finished tenth in the championship with one win at Rockingham and a second place at the season-ending Silverstone weekend.

=== Return to Australia ===
==== Development Series ====
In February 2012, Pye returned to Australia and made the switch to touring cars, becoming the new driver of Triple Eight Race Engineering's championship-winning Monster Energy/GearWrench backed Holden VE Commodore in the 2012 V8 Supercar Development Series. Pye finished the championship in second place behind Scott McLaughlin.

==== Lucas Dumbrell Motorsport ====
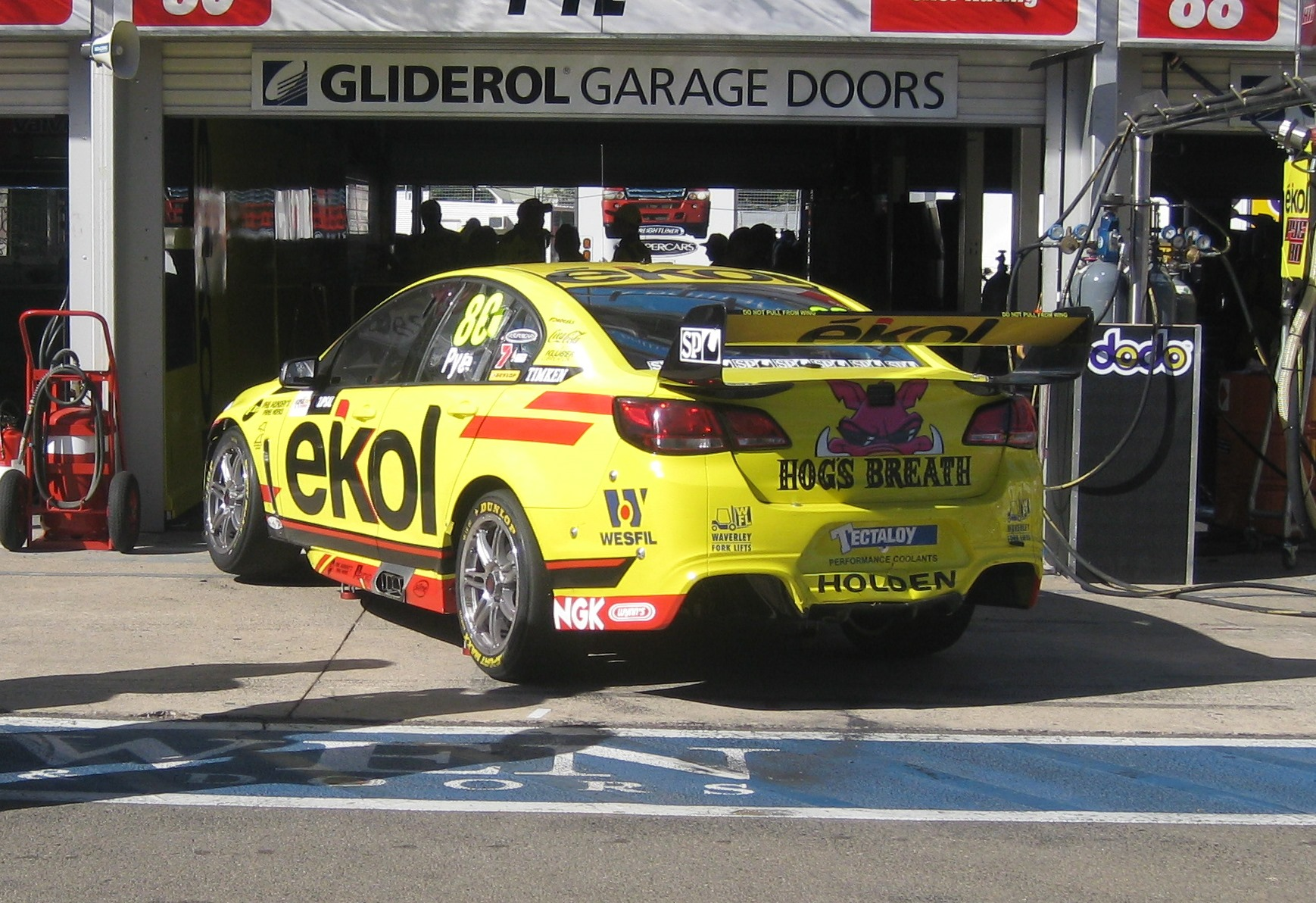
Pye's Holden VF Commodore at the 2013 Clipsal 500 Adelaide

In 2013, Pye graduated to the International V8 Supercars Championship. driving for Lucas Dumbrell Motorsport in a Holden VF Commodore with sponsorship from Ekol and Hog's Breath Cafe. Pye endured a difficult season, including a heavy crash at Symmons Plains Raceway that caused him to miss the Pukekohe round due to the lack of a spare car.

==== Dick Johnson Racing/DJR Team Penske ====
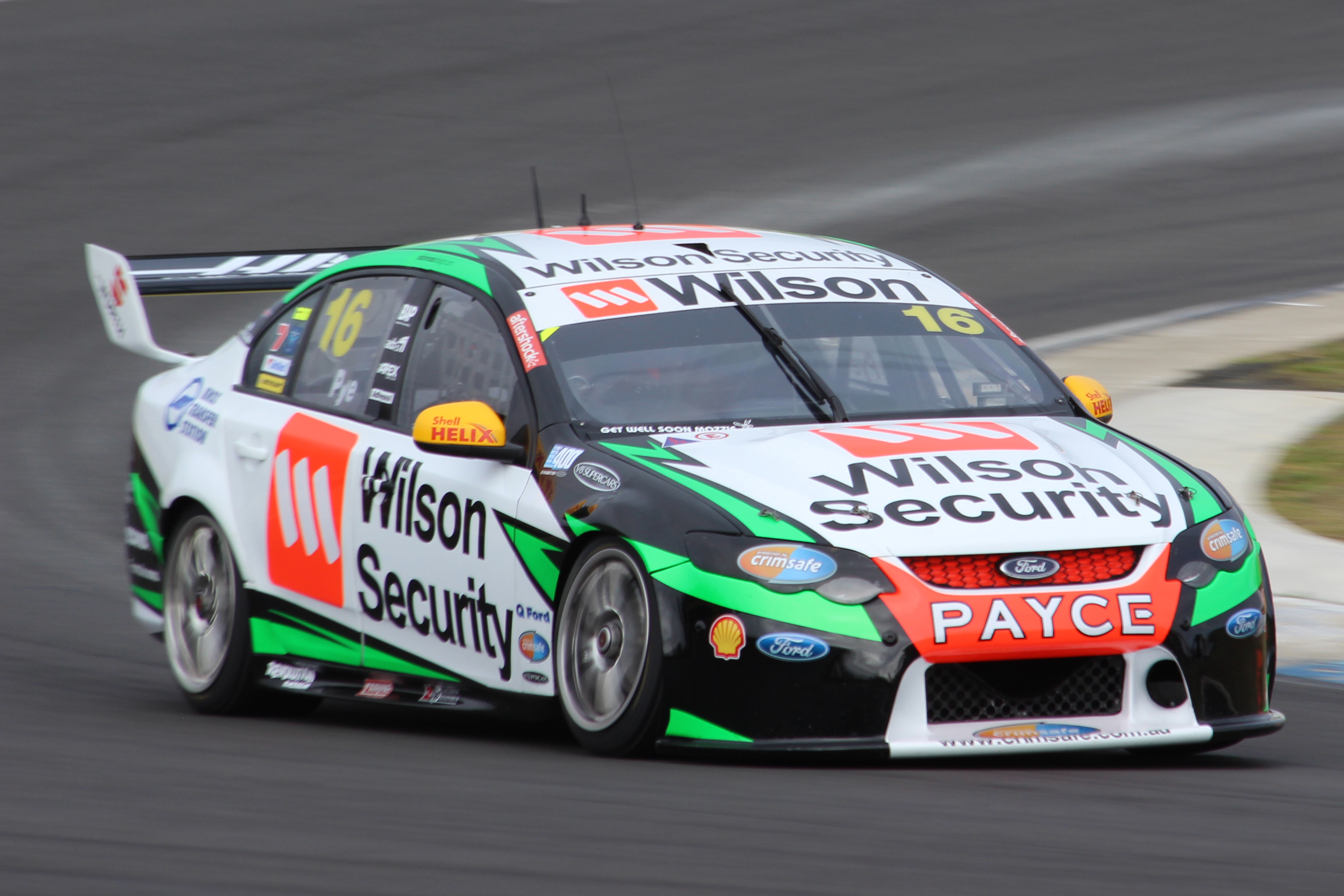
Pye racing at the 2014 Sydney Motorsport Park 400

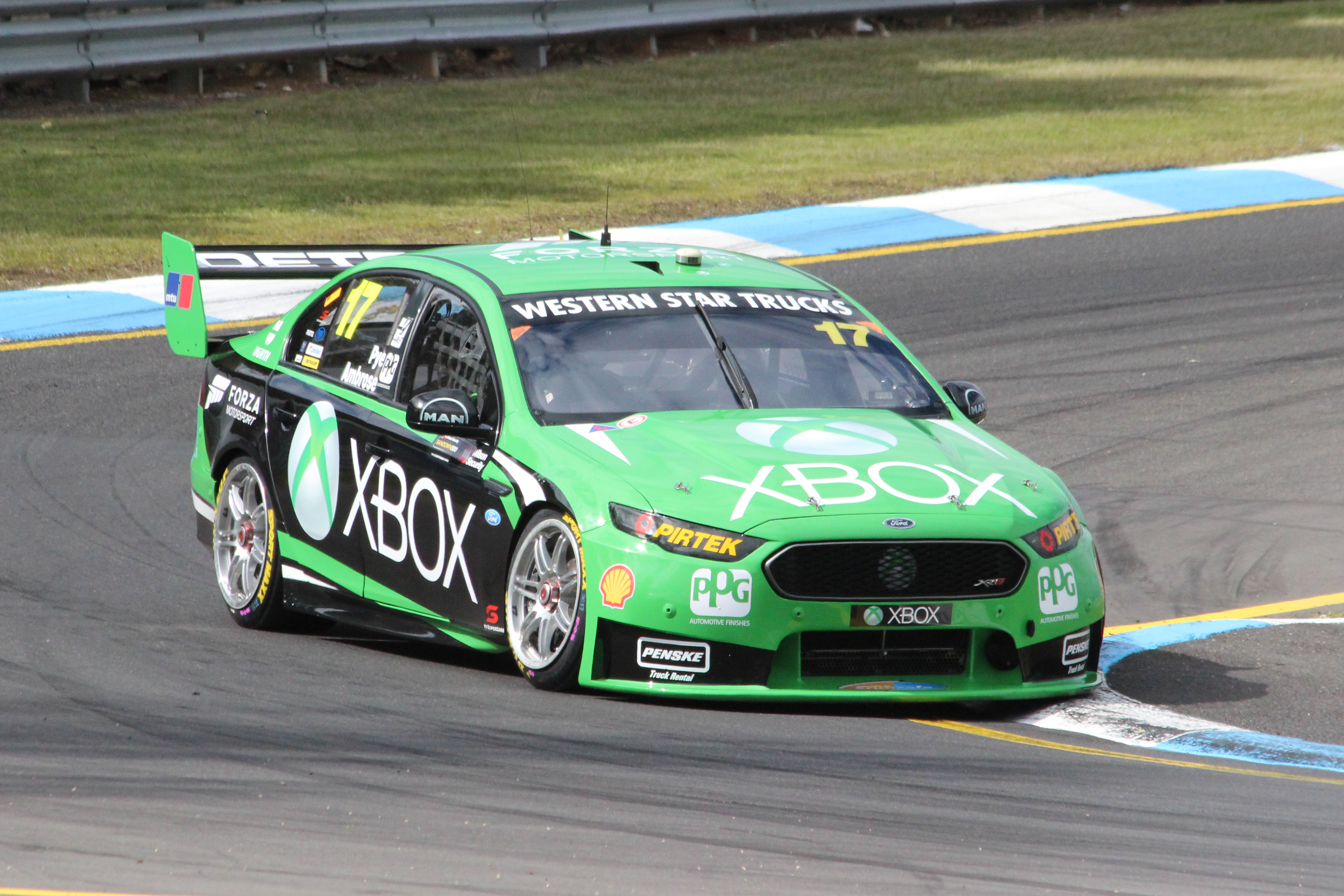
Pye racing at the 2015 Sandown 500

After one season at Lucas Dumbrell Motorsport, Pye signed a two-year deal with Dick Johnson Racing, driving a Ford FG Falcon with Wilson Security sponsorship for 2014. However, in September 2014, Team Penske bought a stake in the team and eventually elected to run only a single entry in 2015 for two-time champion Marcos Ambrose, in his return from NASCAR. Pye signed on as Enduro Cup team-mate to Ambrose at the renamed DJR Team Penske, but after mixed performances at the Adelaide 500 and the non-championship Supercars Challenge, Ambrose stepped down from the seat, leaving Pye back in a full-time drive for the remainder of the season.

With the team signing Fabian Coulthard for 2016, Pye once again faced an uncertain future before the team elected to expand to two cars. Following this confirmation, Pye went on to score his first championship podium at the ITM 500 Auckland. In 2016, Pye scored two more podiums, at Phillip Island and another at Pukekohe on the way to a career-best top-15 championship result. Despite this, he was once again out of a drive for 2017, with his former Development Series rival McLaughlin being signed for DJR Team Penske to join Coulthard.

==== Walkinshaw Racing/Walkinshaw Andretti United ====
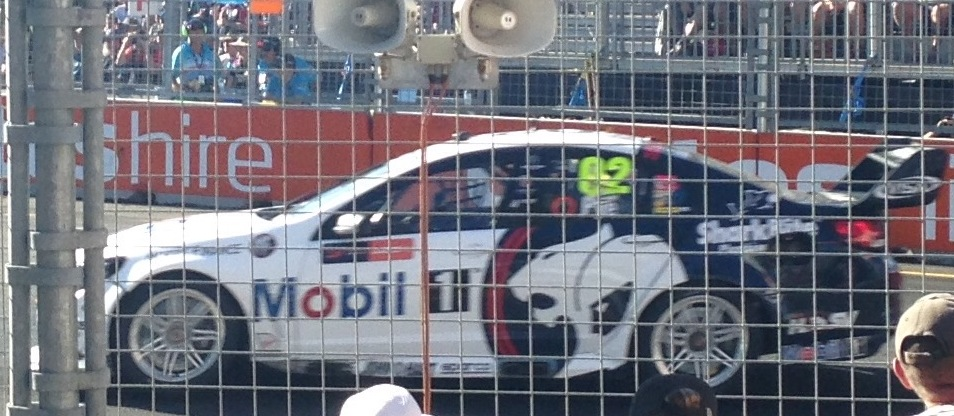
Pye at the 2017 Newcastle 500

In September 2016, Pye was announced as the replacement for Garth Tander at Walkinshaw Racing for 2017, the team's first season since losing the Holden Racing Team moniker. In a difficult season for the team, Pye finished 12th in the standings, ahead of team-mate James Courtney, with the highlight for Pye being a second place at the 2017 Supercheap Auto Bathurst 1000 driving with Warren Luff. Just as happened while Pye was at Dick Johnson Racing, the team was bought out by international interests during his first season at the team, with Andretti Autosport and United Autosports each taking part-ownership in the team which became known as Walkinshaw Andretti United. Pye did retain his seat into 2018 and took his first championship race win in dramatic circumstances at the second event, the Melbourne 400 on the Albert Park Grand Prix Circuit. Pye had led the race comfortably until a late-race shower brought Jamie Whincup back into contention in the final laps. On 7 October, Pye, driving with Warren Luff, went back-to-back with second-place finishes at the Supercheap Auto Bathurst 1000 and later he finished seventh at Newcastle and in the points standings. On 6 November 2019, Pye announced he would be leaving Walkinshaw Andretti United.

==== Team 18 ====
On 7 November 2019, Pye announced that he would be joining Team 18 for the 2020 season.

== Career results ==
=== Karting career summary ===
Season	Series	Position
2005	Australian National Sprint Kart Championship - Junior Clubman	12th
2006	Australian National Sprint Kart Championship - Junior Clubman	**2nd**

Season	Series	Team	Races	Poles	Wins	FLaps	Podiums	Points	Position
2007	New South Wales Formula Ford Championship	Borland Racing Developments	?	?	?	?	?	214	8th
2008	Australian Formula Ford Championship	CAMS Rising Star	23	0	0	1	4	137	7th
2008-09	Toyota Racing Series	European Technique	18	5	3	4	8	895	**3rd**
2009	Australian Formula Ford Championship	CAMS Rising Star	23	0	2	0	8	270	**3rd**
2010	British Formula Ford Championship	Jamun Racing	25	17	12	4	18	581	**1st**
2011	Toyota Racing Series	ETEC Motorsport	12	0	1	1	4	628	4th
2011	British Formula 3 Championship	Double R Racing	29	0	1	0	2	81	10th
2012	Dunlop V8 Supercar Series	Triple Eight Race Engineering	18	2	2	2	10	1688	**2nd**
2012	International V8 Supercars Championship	Lucas Dumbrell Motorsport	3	0	0	0	0	64	56th
2013	International V8 Supercars Championship	Lucas Dumbrell Motorsport	33	0	0	0	0	1049	27th
2014	International V8 Supercars Championship	Dick Johnson Racing	39	0	0	0	0	1407	19th
2015	International V8 Supercars Championship	DJR Team Penske	34	0	0	2	1	1589	19th
2016	International V8 Supercars Championship	DJR Team Penske	30	1	0	0	2	1807	15th
2017	Virgin Australia Supercars Championship	Walkinshaw Racing	27	0	0	0	1	1804	12th
2018	Virgin Australia Supercars Championship	Walkinshaw Andretti United	31	0	1	1	3	2608	7th
2019	Virgin Australia Supercars Championship	Walkinshaw Andretti United	31	0	0	0	0	2193	12th
2020	Virgin Australia Supercars Championship	Team 18	27	0	0	2	3	1586	9th
2021	Repco Supercars Championship	Team 18	30	0	0	1	0	1489	15th
2022	Repco Supercars Championship	Team 18	34	0	0	1	0	1512	16th
2023	Repco Supercars Championship	Team 18	28	0	0	0	0	1524	18th
2024	Repco Supercars Championship	Triple Eight Race Engineering	2	1	1	0	2	228	26th
2025	Repco Supercars Championship	Triple Eight Race Engineering	2	0	0	0	0	-	36th
2025	Repco Supercars Championship - Enduro Cup	Triple Eight Race Engineering	2	0	0	0	1	510	**1st**

=== Complete Toyota Racing Series results ===
(key) (Races in bold indicate pole position) (Races in italics indicate fastest lap)

Year	Entrant	1	2	3	4	5	6	7	8	9	10	11	12	13	14	15	16	17	18	DC	Pts
2008–09	European Technique	**RUA**; **1**; 2	RUA; 2 Ret	RUA; 3; 1	**TIM**; **1**; 4	TIM; 2; 1	TIM; 3; 1	TER; 1; 3	TER; 2; 3	TER; 3; 3	TAU; 1; 11	TAU; 2; 6	TAU; 3; 6	MAN; 1; 7	MAN; 2 Ret	MAN; 3; 5	PUK; 1; 5	PUK; 2; 5	PUK; 3; 3	3rd	895
2011	ETEC Motorsport	TER; 1; 1	TER; 2; 4	TER; 3; 5	TIM; 1; 3	TIM; 2; 4	TIM; 3; 7	HMP; 1; 11	HMP; 2; 9	HMP; 3; 4	MAN; 1; 3	MAN; 2; 4	MAN; 3; 3	TAU; 1	TAU; 2	TAU; 3				4th	628

=== Complete New Zealand Grand Prix results ===
Year	Team	Car	Qualifying	Main race
2009	(New Zealand) European Technique	Tatuus TT104ZZ - Toyota	7th	5th
2011	(New Zealand) ETEC Motorsport	Tatuus TT104ZZ - Toyota	3rd	**3rd**

=== Complete British Formula Ford Championship results ===
(key) (Races in bold indicate pole position) (Races in italics indicate fastest lap)

Year	Entrant	1	2	3	4	5	6	7	8	9	10	11	12	13	14	15	16	17	18	19	20	21	22	23	24	25	DC	Pts
2010	Jamun Racing	**OUL**; **1**; 1	**OUL**; **2** Ret	**OUL**; **3**; 1	KNO; 1 Ret	KNO; 2; 1	**KNO**; **3**; 1	ZAN; 1; 10	ZAN; 2; 14	**CAS**; **1**; 1	**CAS**; **2**; 1	ROC; 1; 3	ROC; 2; 3	**SIL**; **1**; 1	**SIL**; **2**; 4	SIL; 3; 2	SNE; 1; 1	**SNE**; **2**; 1	**BRH**; **1**; 1	**BRH**; **2**; 2	**BRH**; **3**; 1	**DON**; **1**; 5	**DON**; **2**; 3	**DON**; **3** Ret	**BRH**; **1**; 1	**BRH**; **2**; 2	1st	581

=== Complete British Formula Three Championship results ===
(key) (Races in bold indicate pole position) (Races in italics indicate fastest lap)

Year	Entrant	Chassis	Engine	1	2	3	4	5	6	7	8	9	10	11	12	13	14	15	16	17	18	19	20	21	22	23	24	25	26	27	28	29	30	DC	Pts
2011	Double R Racing	Dallara F308	Mercedes HWA	MNZ; 1 Ret	MNZ; 2; 12	MNZ; 3; 14	OUL; 1; 9	OUL; 2; 9	OUL; 3; 8	SNE; 1 Ret	SNE; 2; 11	SNE; 3; 7	BRH; 1; 7	BRH; 2; 4	BRH; 3; 8	NÜR; 1; 12	NÜR; 2; 10	NÜR; 3; 12	LEC; 1; 14	LEC; 2 Ret	LEC; 3 Ret	SPA; 1; 16	SPA; 2; 16	SPA; 3; 15	ROC; 1; 8	**ROC**; **2**; 1	ROC; 3; 7	DON; 1; 4	DON; 2 Ret	DON; 3; 5	SIL; 1; 2	SIL; 2; 20	SIL; 3; 17	10th	81

=== Super2 Series results ===
Super2 Series results
Year	Team	No.	Car	1	2	3	4	5	6	7	8	9	10	11	12	13	14	15	16	17	18	Position	Points
2012	Triple Eight Race Engineering	80	Holden VE Commodore	ADE; R1; 5	ADE; R2; 7	**BAR**; **R3**; 1	**BAR**; **R4**; 9	BAR; R5; 2	TOW; R6; 4	TOW; R7; Ret	TOW; R8; 11	**QLD**; **R9**; 2	QLD; R10; 4	QLD; R11; 2	BAT; R12; 3	BAT; R13; 3	WIN; R14; 2	WIN; R15; 11	WIN; R16; 2	SYD; R17; 2	SYD; R18; 1	2nd	1688

=== Supercars Championship results ===
Supercars results
Year	Team	No.	Car	1	2	3	4	5	6	7	8	9	10	11	12	13	14	15	16	17	18	19	20	21	22	23	24	25	26	27	28	29	30	31	32	33	34	35	36	37	38	39	Position	Points
2012	Lucas Dumbrell Motorsport	30	Holden VE Commodore	ADE; R1	ADE; R2	SYM; R3	SYM; R4	HAM; R5	HAM; R6	BAR; R7	BAR; R8	BAR; R9	PHI; R10; PO	PHI; R11; PO	HID; R12; PO	HID; R13; PO	TOW; R14	TOW; R15	QLD; R16; PO	QLD; R17; PO	SMP; R18	SMP; R19	SAN; Q 22	SAN; R20; 24	BAT; R21; Ret	SUR; R22	SUR; R23	YMC; R24	YMC; R25	YMC; R26	WIN; R27	WIN; R28	SYD; R29	SYD; R30									56th	64
2013	Lucas Dumbrell Motorsport	80	Holden VF Commodore	ADE; R1; 13	ADE; R2; 11	SYM; R3; 18	SYM; R4; 14	SYM; R5; Ret	PUK; R6; WD	PUK; R7; WD	PUK; R8; WD	PUK; R9; WD	BAR; R10; 28	BAR; R11; 27	BAR; R12; 20	COA; R13; 15	COA; R14; 22	COA; R15; 24	COA; R16; 16	HID; R17; 25	HID; R18; 28	HID; R19; 18	TOW; R20; 24	TOW; R21; 21	QLD; R22; 22	QLD; R23; 25	QLD; R24; 19	WIN; R25; 12	WIN; R26; 15	WIN; R27; Ret	SAN; QR; 26	SAN; R28; Ret	BAT; R29; 6	SUR; R30; 13	SUR; R31; Ret	PHI; R32; 15	PHI; R33; 11	PHI; R34; 14	SYD; R35; Ret	SYD; R36; Ret			27th	1049
2014	Dick Johnson Racing	16	Ford FG Falcon	ADE; R1; 10	ADE; R2; 20	ADE; R3; Ret	SYM; R4; 10	SYM; R5; 7	SYM; R6; 16	WIN; R7; 14	WIN; R8; 12	WIN; R9; 19	PUK; R10; 18	PUK; R11; 11	PUK; R12; 9	PUK; R13; 13	BAR; R14; 18	BAR; R15; 7	BAR; R16; 12	HID; R17; 15	HID; R18; 15	HID; R19; 14	TOW; R20; 12	TOW; R21; 12	TOW; R22; 8	QLD; R23; 16	QLD; R24; 12	QLD; R25; 4	SMP; R26; 20	SMP; R27; 21	SMP; R28; Ret	SAN; QR; 19	SAN; R29; 5	BAT; R30; Ret	SUR; R31; DSQ	SUR; R32; DSQ	PHI; R33; DSQ	PHI; R34; DSQ	PHI; R35; DSQ	SYD; R36; Ret	SYD; R37; 9	SYD; R38; 21	19th	1407
2015	DJR Team Penske	17	Ford FG X Falcon	ADE; R1	ADE; R2	ADE; R3	SYM; R4; 18	SYM; R5; 17	SYM; R6; 18	BAR; R7; 22	BAR; R8; 21	BAR; R9; Ret	WIN; R10; 15	WIN; R11; 18	WIN; R12; 8	HID; R13; 6	HID; R14; 4	HID; R15; 16	TOW; R16; 5	TOW; R17; 19	QLD; R18; Ret	QLD; R19; 10	QLD; R20; 15	SMP; R21; 9	SMP; R22; 22	SMP; R23; 17	SAN; QR; 11	SAN; R24; 12	BAT; R25; Ret	SUR; R26; 8	SUR; R27; 21	PUK; R28; 5	PUK; R29; 8	PUK; R30; 3	PHI; R31; 13	PHI; R32; 6	PHI; R33; 14	SYD; R34; 16	SYD; R35; 9	SYD; R36; 9			19th	1589
2016	DJR Team Penske	17	Ford FG X Falcon	**ADE**; **R1**; **12**	ADE; R2; 7	ADE; R3; 17	SYM; R4; 14	SYM; R5; 14	PHI; R6; 26	PHI; R7; 3	BAR; R8; 24	BAR; R9; 19	WIN; R10; 12	WIN; R11; 7	HID; R12; 5	HID; R13; Ret	TOW; R14; 18	TOW; R15; 7	QLD; R16; 20	QLD; R17; 24	SMP; R18; Ret	SMP; R19; 15	SAN; QR; 21	SAN; R20; 15	BAT; R21; 5	SUR; R22; 18	SUR; R23; 23	PUK; R24; 9	PUK; R25; 11	PUK; R26; 2	PUK; R27; 9	SYD; R28; 14	SYD; R29; 13										15th	1807
2017	Walkinshaw Racing	2	Holden VF Commodore	ADE; R1; 16	ADE; R2; 19	SYM; R3; Ret	SYM; R4; 12	PHI; R5; 17	PHI; R6; 12	BAR; R7; 20	BAR; R8; 14	WIN; R9; 15	WIN; R10; 22	HID; R11; 23	HID; R12; 8	TOW; R13; 12	TOW; R14; 18	QLD; R15; 13	QLD; R16; 16	SMP; R17; 5	SMP; R18; 18	SAN; QR; 15	SAN; R19; 21	BAT; R20; 2	SUR; R21; 11	SUR; R22; 13	PUK; R23; 14	PUK; R24; 10	NEW; R25; 7	NEW; R26; 14													12th	1804
2018	Walkinshaw Andretti United	2	Holden ZB Commodore	ADE; R1; 10	ADE; R2; 8	MEL; R3; 6	MEL; R4; 11	MEL; R5; 1	MEL; R6; 5	SYM; R7; 8	SYM; R8; 6	PHI; R9; 9	PHI; R10; 11	BAR; R11; 12	BAR; R12; 15	WIN; R13; 2	WIN; R14; 6	HID; R15; 4	HID; R16; 20	TOW; R17; 14	TOW; R18; 21	QLD; R19; 16	QLD; R20; 19	SMP; R21; 25	BEN; R22; 18	BEN; R23; 6	SAN; QR; 19	SAN; R24; 6	BAT; R25; 2	SUR; R26; 13	SUR; R27; C	PUK; R28; 6	PUK; R29; 15	NEW; R30; 4	NEW; R31; 10								7th	2608
2019	Walkinshaw Andretti United	2	Holden ZB Commodore	ADE; R1; Ret	ADE; R2; 17	MEL; R3; 13	MEL; R4; 14	MEL; R5; 6	MEL; R6; 11	SYM; R7; 12	SYM; R8; 8	PHI; R9; 8	PHI; R10; 15	BAR; R11; 16	BAR; R12; Ret	WIN; R13; 10	WIN; R14; 8	HID; R15; 10	HID; R16; 19	TOW; R17; 20	TOW; R18; 15	QLD; R19; 21	QLD; R20; 16	BEN; R21; 15	BEN; R22; 16	PUK; R23; 13	PUK; R24; 6	BAT; R25; 7	SUR; R26; 5	SUR; R27; 4	SAN; QR; 23	SAN; R28; 5	NEW; R29; 6	NEW; R30; 5									12th	2193
2020	Team 18	20	Holden ZB Commodore	ADE; R1; 15	ADE; R2; Ret	MEL; R3; C	MEL; R4; C	MEL; R5; C	MEL; R6; C	SMP1; R7; 17	SMP1; R8; 11	SMP1; R9; 12	SMP2; R10; 12	SMP2; R11; 21	SMP2; R12; 5	HID1; R13; 3	HID1; R14; 16	HID1; R15; 22	HID2; R16; 13	HID2; R17; 3	HID2; R18; 3	TOW1; R19; 9	TOW1; R20; 9	TOW1; R21; 6	TOW2; R22; 9	TOW2; R23; 6	TOW2; R24; 5	BEN1; R25; 7	BEN1; R26; 13	BEN1; R27; 6	BEN2; R28; 12	BEN2; R29; 19	BEN2; R30; 12	BAT; R31; 6									9th	1586
2021	Team 18	20	Holden ZB Commodore	BAT1; R1; 19	BAT1; R2; 8	SAN; R3; 12	SAN; R4; 8	SAN; R5; 22	SYM; R6; 8	SYM; R7; 9	SYM; R8; 14	BEN; R9; 13	BEN; R10; 10	BEN; R11; 9	HID; R12; 21	HID; R13; 13	HID; R14; 16	TOW1; R15; 23	TOW1; R16; 21	TOW2; R17; 7	TOW2; R18; 6	TOW2; R19; 18	SMP1; R20; 19	SMP1; R21; 15	SMP1; R22; 20	SMP2; R23; 9	SMP2; R24; 5	SMP2; R25; 18	SMP3; R26; 6	SMP3; R27; 12	SMP3; R28; 6	SMP4; R29; 6	SMP4; R30; C	BAT2; R31; Ret									15th	1489
2022	Team 18	20	Holden ZB Commodore	SMP; R1; Ret	SMP; R2; 15	SYM; R3; 7	SYM; R4; 7	SYM; R5; 13	MEL; R6; 11	MEL; R7; 4	MEL; R8; 25	MEL; R9; 11	BAR; R10; 19	BAR; R11; Ret	BAR; R12; DNS	WIN; R13; 6	WIN; R14; Ret	WIN; R15; 14	HID; R16; 6	HID; R17; Ret	HID; R18; DNS	TOW; R19; 5	TOW; R20; Ret	BEN; R21; 12	BEN; R22; 20	BEN; R23; 13	SAN; R24; 7	SAN; R25; 5	SAN; R26; 7	PUK; R27; 10	PUK; R28; 5	PUK; R29; 7	BAT; R30; 16	SUR; R31; 17	SUR; R32; 12	ADE; R33; Ret	ADE; R34; 14						16th	1512
2023	Team 18	20	Chevrolet Camaro ZL1	NEW; R1; 7	NEW; R2; 17	MEL; R3; 15	MEL; R4; 18	MEL; R5; 20	MEL; R6; 13	BAR; R7; 20	BAR; R8; 17	BAR; R9; 10	SYM; R10; 5	SYM; R11; 20	SYM; R12; 15	HID; R13; 12	HID; R14; 9	HID; R15; 23	TOW; R16; 6	TOW; R17; 11	SMP; R18; 10	SMP; R19; 11	BEN; R20; 22	BEN; R21; 15	BEN; R22; 11	SAN; R23; 21	BAT; R24; 17	SUR; R25; 6	SUR; R26; Ret	ADE; R27; 16	ADE; R28; 16												18th	1524
2024	Triple Eight Race Engineering	87	Chevrolet Camaro ZL1	BAT1; R1	BAT1; R2	MEL; R3	MEL; R4	MEL; R5	MEL; R6	TAU; R7	TAU; R8	BAR; R9	BAR; R10	HID; R11	HID; R12	TOW; R13	TOW; R14	SMP; R15	SMP; R16	SYM; R17	SYM; R18	SAN; R19; 1	BAT2; R20; 3	SUR; R21	SUR; R22	ADE; R23	ADE; R24																26th	558
2025	Triple Eight Race Engineering	1	Chevrolet Camaro ZL1	SYD; R1	SYD; R2	SYD; R3	MEL; R4	MEL; R5	MEL; R6	MEL; R7	TAU; R8	TAU; R9	TAU; R10	SYM; R11	SYM; R12	SYM; R13	BAR; R14	BAR; R15	BAR; R16	HID; R17	HID; R18	HID; R19	TOW; R20	TOW; R21	TOW; R22	QLD; R23	QLD; R24	QLD; R25	BEN; R26; 4	BAT; R27; 17	SUR; R28	SUR; R29	SAN; R30	SAN; R31	ADE; R32	ADE; R33	ADE; R34						28th	234
2026	Triple Eight Race Engineering	888	Ford Mustang S650	SMP; R1	SMP; R2	SMP; R1	SMP; R2	SMP; R3	MEL; R4	MEL; R5	MEL; R6	MEL; R7	TAU; R8	TAU; R9	CHR; R10	CHR; R11	CHR; R12	CHR; R13	SYM; R14	SYM; R15	SYM; R16	HID; R20	HID; R21	HID; R22	TOW; R23	TOW; R24	TOW; R25	BAR; R17	BAR; R18	BAR; R19	QLD; R26	QLD; R27	QLD; R28	BEN; R29; 4	BAT; R30; 2	SUR; R31	SUR; R32	SAN; R33	SAN; R34	ADE; R35	ADE; R36	ADE; R37	-	-

=== Complete Bathurst 1000 results ===
Year	Team	Car	Co-driver	Position	Laps
2012	Lucas Dumbrell Motorsport	Holden Commodore VE	(Australia) Taz Douglas	DNF	97
2013	Lucas Dumbrell Motorsport	Holden Commodore VF	(Australia) Paul Morris	6th	161
2014	Dick Johnson Racing	Ford Falcon FG	(Australia) Ashley Walsh	DNF	70
2015	DJR Team Penske	Ford Falcon FG X	(Australia) Marcos Ambrose	DNF	137
2016	DJR Team Penske	Ford Falcon FG X	(Australia) Tony D'Alberto	5th	161
2017	Walkinshaw Racing	Holden Commodore VF	(Australia) Warren Luff	**2nd**	161
2018	Walkinshaw Andretti United	Holden Commodore ZB	(Australia) Warren Luff	**2nd**	161
2019	Walkinshaw Andretti United	Holden Commodore ZB	(Australia) Warren Luff	7th	161
2020	Charlie Schwerkolt Racing	Holden Commodore ZB	(Australia) Dean Fiore	6th	161
2021	Charlie Schwerkolt Racing	Holden Commodore ZB	(Australia) James Golding	DNF	3
2022	Charlie Schwerkolt Racing	Holden Commodore ZB	(Australia) Tyler Everingham	16th	161
2023	Charlie Schwerkolt Racing	Chevrolet Camaro Mk.6	(Australia) Warren Luff	17th	160
2024	Triple Eight Race Engineering	Chevrolet Camaro Mk.6	(Australia) Will Brown	**3rd**	161
2025	Triple Eight Race Engineering	Chevrolet Camaro Mk.6	(Australia) Will Brown	17th	159
2026	Triple Eight Race Engineering	Ford Mustang S650	(Australia) Will Brown	**2nd**	161

=== Complete Bathurst 12 Hour results ===
Year	Team	Co-drivers	Car	Class	Laps	Overall position	Class position
2012	(Australia) Racer Industries	(Australia) Elliott Barbour (New Zealand) Chris Pither	HSV VXR Turbo	E	231	7th	**1st**

Sporting positions
Preceded by James Cole	Winner of the British Formula Ford Championship; 2010	Succeeded by Scott Malvern
Awards and achievements
Preceded by Chaz Mostert	Mike Kable Young Gun Award; 2012	Succeeded by Scott McLaughlin
