= 2011 New Zealand Grand Prix =

- Race 3, Round 4 of 5 of the 2011 Toyota Racing Series

Race details
- Date: 13 February 2011
- Official name: LVI New Zealand Grand Prix
- Location: Manfeild Autocourse, Feilding, New Zealand
- Course: Permanent racing facility
- Course length: 3.033 km (1.885 miles)
- Distance: 35 laps, 106.16 km (65.96 miles)
- Weather: Fine

Pole position
Driver	(New Zealand) Mitch Evans	Giles Motorsport
- Time: 1:04.141

Fastest lap
Driver	(New Zealand) Mitch Evans	Giles Motorsport
- Time: 1:04.509 on lap 31

Podium
First	(New Zealand) Mitch Evans	Giles Motorsport
Second	(Russia) Daniil Kvyat	Victory Motor Racing
Third	(Australia) Scott Pye	ETEC Motorsport

The 2011 New Zealand Grand Prix event for open wheel racing cars was held at Manfeild Autocourse near Feilding on 13 February 2011. It was the fifty-sixth New Zealand Grand Prix and was open to Toyota Racing Series cars. The event was also the third race of the fourth round of the 2011 Toyota Racing Series.

Sixteen Tatuus-Toyota cars started the race which was won by 16-year-old New Zealander Mitch Evans who became the youngest ever winner of the New Zealand Grand Prix and who is believed to have become the youngest driver to win an international grand prix anywhere in the world. The Giles Motorsport driver won by three seconds from another 16-year-old competitor, Russian Daniil Kvyat, of Victory Motor Racing. Australian ETEC Motorsport driver Scott Pye was third.

Evans started from pole position alongside Nick Cassidy and won the drag race to the first corner. Evans, Cassidy, Kvyat and Pye quickly built a gap on the field.

On lap 16 Cassidy spun, bringing to an end to the direct threat to the lead held by Evans who controlled the second half of the race from the front to win from Kvyat and Pye. British driver and grandson of 1964 and 1965 NZ Grand Prix winner, Josh Hill finished fourth winning a battle for the position with Australian Nick Foster. German driver Mario Farnbacher was sixth also winning his position battle with Russian Ivan Lukashevich. Cassidy finished a disappointing eighth ahead of Kotaro Sakurai and Jordan Skinner. New Zealand open-wheel legend Ken Smith also completed full race distance. Jamie McNee was the only other driver to be classified.

Defending race champion Earl Bamber, a late entry into the race, withdrew on lap 19.

== Classification ==
=== Qualifying ===
Pos	No.	Driver	Team	Time	Grid
1	1	(New Zealand) Mitch Evans	Giles Motorsport	1:03.965	1
2	7	(New Zealand) Nick Cassidy	Giles Motorsport	1:04.131	2
3	19	(Australia) Scott Pye	ETEC Motorsport	1:04.177	3
4	13	(Australia) Nick Foster	Giles Motorsport	1:04.244	4
5	29	(Russia) Daniil Kvyat	Victory Motor Racing	1:04.616	5
6	20	(United Kingdom) Josh Hill	ETEC Motorsport	1:04.660	6
7	36	(United Kingdom) Alex Lynn	Giles Motorsport	1:04.695	7
8	5	(Russia) Ivan Lukashevich	M2 Competition	1:04.699	8
9	87	(New Zealand) Damon Leitch	Victory Motor Racing	1:04.788	9
10	48	(Germany) Mario Farnbacher	Giles Motorsport	1:04.820	10
11	8	(New Zealand) Jamie McNee	ETEC Motorsport	1:04.898	11
12	17	(New Zealand) Alastair Wootten	DART International	1:04.955	12
13	2	(New Zealand) Earl Bamber	Earl Bamber Motorsport	1:04.999	13
14	4	(Japan) Kotaro Sakurai	M2 Competition	1:05.228	14
-	11	(New Zealand) Ken Smith	Ken Smith Motorsport	no time	PL
-	22	(Australia) Jordan Skinner	M2 Competition	no time	PL

=== Race ===
Pos	No.	Driver	Team	Laps	Time/Retired	Gap
1	1	(New Zealand) Mitch Evans	Giles Motorsport	35	38min 55.818sec	1
2	29	(Russia) Daniil Kvyat	Victory Motor Racing	35	+ 3.229 s	5
3	19	(Australia) Scott Pye	ETEC Motorsport	35	+ 5.882 s	3
4	20	(United Kingdom) Josh Hill	ETEC Motorsport	35	+ 13.970 s	6
5	13	(Australia) Nick Foster	Giles Motorsport	35	+ 14.338 s	4
6	48	(Germany) Mario Farnbacher	Giles Motorsport	35	+ 16.463 s	10
7	5	(Russia) Ivan Lukashevich	M2 Competition	35	+ 16.870 s	8
8	7	(New Zealand) Nick Cassidy	Giles Motorsport	35	+ 21.363 s	2
9	4	(Japan) Kotaro Sakurai	M2 Competition	35	+ 24.581 s	14
10	22	(Australia) Jordan Skinner	M2 Competition	35	+ 26.444 s	16
11	11	(New Zealand) Ken Smith	Ken Smith Motorsport	35	+ 39.627 s	15
12	8	(New Zealand) Jamie McNee	ETEC Motorsport	32	+ 3 laps	11
Ret	2	(New Zealand) Earl Bamber	Earl Bamber Motorsport	18	Retired	13
Ret	17	(New Zealand) Alastair Wootten	DART International	14	Retired	12
Ret	36	(United Kingdom) Alex Lynn	Giles Motorsport	13	Retired	7
Ret	87	(New Zealand) Damon Leitch	Victory Motor Racing	1	Retired	9

Preceded by 2010 New Zealand Grand Prix	New Zealand Grand Prix; 2011	Succeeded by 2012 New Zealand Grand Prix
