= Juno Racing Cars =

British sportscar constructor

- Industry: Automotive
- Founded: 1999
- Founder: Ewan Baldry
- Headquarters: Portugal
- Products: Racing cars

Juno Racing Cars is a British Group CN sportscar constructor. On 7 August 2014 it was announced that Juno Racing Cars was acquired by Ginetta Cars. In June 2016 Juno was bought by a private owner and the base of operations was moved to Portugal.

== History ==
- Former series: British Formula Ford (2009-2010)
- Noted drivers: (United Kingdom) Felix Fisher (United Kingdom) Chrissy Palmer (United Kingdom) Nathan Freke (United Kingdom) David Ellesley (United Kingdom) Chris Holmes (United Kingdom) Tom Bradshaw

Juno Racing Cars was founded by former Williams F1 engineer Ewan Baldry in 1999. The factory's first car, the Juno SS1, made its track debut in 2001. The car was designed by Baldry and design engineer Ben Lang. Lang was also chief engineer for the TVR Tuscan Speed 6. The SS1 was designed for the 2 liter National Supersports class. The car featured a spaceframe chassis built from cold drawn stainless steel. The car was powered by a Vauxhall 20XE engine. Robert Oldershaw Jr. won the SP2 class in the National Supersports series in a Juno SS1.

The successor of the SS1 was the SS2. The SS2 had a similar design but the technical aspect was significantly upgraded. The chassis was wider and featured a new Hewland sequential gearbox. Robert Oldershaw Jr. won several races in the BARC National Supersports. Oldershaw Jr. finished second in the final classification. Oldershaw Jr. followed up this performance the following year.

A more powerful sportscar was launched by Juno in 2005, the SS3 V6. David Mountain and Andreas Halkiopolous competed the Jaguar powered SS3 V6 in the Britsports Endurance Championship. The SS3 won six races in the Britsports championship. The SSE, launched in 2008, continued to win races in various Group CN classes.

Juno Racing Cars designed their first Formula Ford single seater for the 2009 British Formula Ford season. The Juno JA09 was entered as a factory entry for Chrissy Palmer. Chrissy Palmer raced three races at Oulton Park for the team finishing fifth in the first race. Palmer would go on to win the Formula Ford Festival in 2009 in after switching to the Mygale chassis. A new Formula Ford chassis was designed for the 2010 British Formula Ford season. For 2010 Juno partnered with Century Motorsport to field a factory supported entry. Fielding various drivers, team principal Nathan Freke among them, the team failed to achieve significant results.

On 7 August 2014 it was revealed that Ginetta Cars acquired Juno Racing Cars. The collaboration was formed in order to field an LMP3 entry in 2015.

In June 2016 Juno was bought by a private owner and the base of operations was moved to Portugal. New models are now being developed, including a new formula 1000 and a new version of the CN model.

Juno Racing Cars is planning to develop a One Make Series that will enable its clients to race between themselves using new or old cars. A special "light budget" Juno will be developed to support this series.

== Racing cars ==
Year	Car	Class
2001	Juno SS1	Group CN
2003	Juno SS2	Group CN
2005	Juno SS3-V6	Group CN
2008	Juno SSE	Group CN
2009	Juno CN09	Group CN
2010	Juno JA2010	Formula Ford/750MC Formula 4
2011	Juno CN2011	Group CN
2012	Juno Civic 2012	Group CN
