= Fábio Gamberini =

Brazilian racing driver (born 1992)

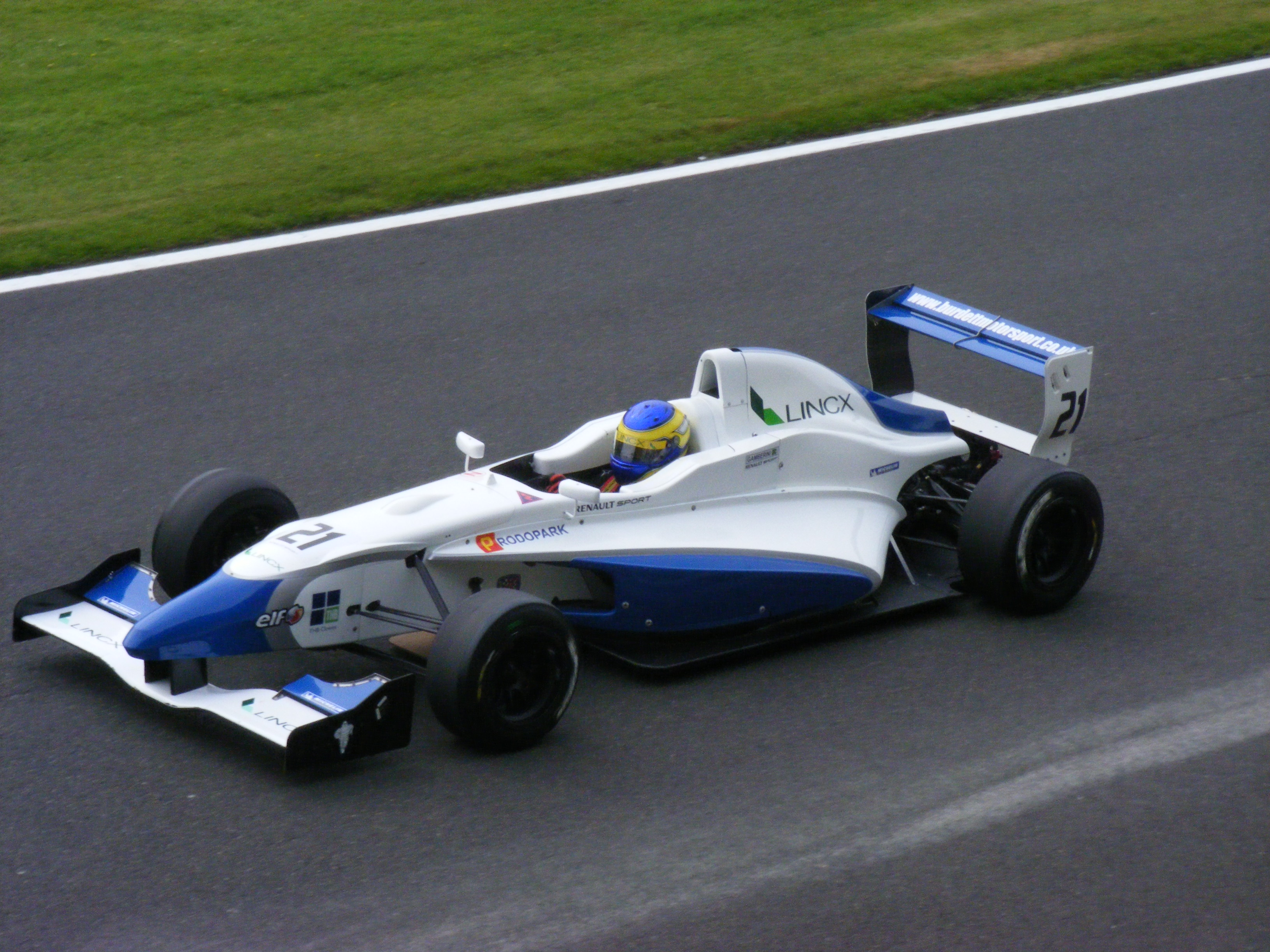
- Fabio Gamberini (2010)
- Nationality: (Brazil) Brazilian
- Born: 22 September 1992 (age 34)

Previous series
- 2012 2011 2010 2009: GP3 Series; European F3 Open Championship; Formula Renault 2.0 UK; British Formula Ford

Fábio Gamberini (born 22 September 1992) is a Brazilian former racing driver who has competed in the GP3 Series and the European F3 Open Championship. In the latter series, he drove for the leading team in the series, British-based Team West-Tec F3 and was widely lauded for his superb performances in the older Copa-class car in 2011.

== Racing record ==
=== Career summary ===
Season	Series	Team	Races	Wins	Poles	F/Laps	Podiums	Points	Position
2009	British Formula Ford	Fluid Motorsport Development	25	0	0	0	0	132	15th
2009	British Formula Ford scholarship class	Fluid Motorsport Development	25	2	4	2	16	510	3rd
2009	Formula Ford Festival Pre-finals	Fluid Motorsport Development	2	0	0	0	0	N/A	N/A
2009	Formula Ford Festival Final	Fluid Motorsport Development	1	0	0	0	0	N/A	NC
2010	British Formula Renault 2.0	Mark Burdett Motorsport	18	0	0	0	0	126	15th
2011	European F3 Open Copa Class	Team West-Tec	16	10	6	12	13	130	1st
2011	European F3 Open	Team West-Tec	16	1	0	0	3	79	3rd
2012	GP3 Series	Atech CRS Grand Prix	2	0	0	0	0	1	20th

Sporting positions
Preceded by Noel Jammal	European F3 Open; Copa Champion; 2011	Succeeded by Kevin Giovesi
