= Josh Hill (racing driver) =

British racing driver (born 1991)

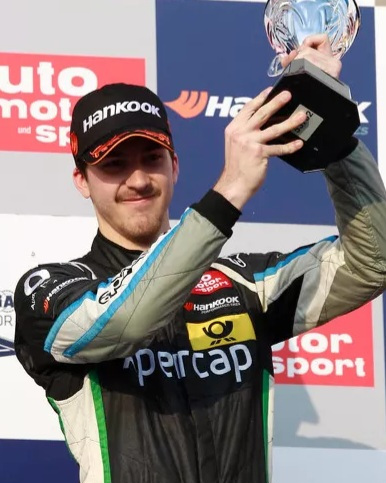
- Hill in 2013
- Nationality: (United Kingdom) British
- Born: Joshua Damon Devereux Hill; 9 January 1991 (age 35) Surrey, England
- Relatives: Damon Hill (father); Graham Hill (grandfather)
- Categorisation: FIA Silver

Previous series
- 2013 2012-2013 2012 2011-2012 2011-2012 2011 2009-10 2008: FIA Formula 3 European Championship; MRF Challenge; Eurocup Formula Renault 2.0; Formula Renault 2.0 NEC; Toyota Racing Series; Formula Renault 2.0 UK; British Formula Ford Championship; Ginetta Junior Championship

Championship titles
- 2008: Ginetta Junior Winter Series

Joshua Damon Devereux Hill (born 9 January 1991) is a British former racing driver from Surrey, England, United Kingdom. He is the son of 1996 Formula One World Champion Damon Hill and the grandson of two-time Formula One World Champion Graham Hill.

== Career ==
Hill started racing in September 2006, aged 15, in the Club100 karting championship.

In 2008, Hill stepped into car racing, competing in the Ginetta Junior Championship, getting a podium in only his second weekend and finishing 3rd overall before becoming Winter Series champion.

Hill debuted in single-seaters in the British Formula Ford Championship, contesting the 2009 and 2010 seasons with Jamun Racing, finishing fifth overall in 2010 with 12 podiums including five wins.

Hill entered the Formula Renault 2.0 UK Championship Winter Series at the end of 2010 before starting a full campaign in 2011 with Manor Competition, finishing in seventh. He also appeared in New Zealand's Toyota Racing Series, finishing fourth in the New Zealand Grand Prix, and the Formula Renault 2.0 Northern European Cup, joining the series from round 11 with Keerbergs Transport Racing. After a difficult season, Hill contested the 2011 Formula Renault UK 2.0 Finals Series with Fortec Motorsport, achieving six pole positions and two wins from six races.

In January 2012, Hill again competed in the Toyota Racing Series, scoring a win and four other podiums on his way to 4th overall.

It was announced at the Autosport International show in January 2012 that Hill was now part of the MSA Team UK line up. Shortly after, he was also named as a BRDC Superstar on 27 February 2012.

Plans to race in Formula Renault UK 2.0 for 2012 were halted after it was announced in March that the championship would not go ahead that year, with the series eventually folding in September. Instead Hill re-entered the Formula Renault 2.0 NEC, finishing third overall and taking five wins. As a result of his top 3 finish, Hill was awarded a Formula Renault 3.5 Series test at MotorLand Aragón, which he completed with Fortec Motorsport and ISR Racing.

Following a strong 2012 season, Hill secured a spot as a finalist in the end of year Autosport BRDC Award "Young Driver of the Year" category. Along with a fitness, media, and simulator assessments, he and his fellow finalists were given tests in a FIA Formula Two Championship Williams JPH1, a McLaren MP4-12C GT3, and a Mercedes-AMG C-Coupé DTM. On 2 December 2012, it was announced that the award would be going to Jake Dennis, Hill's teammate for the 2012 Formula Renault 2.0 NEC.

Hill competed in the final round of the MRF Challenge in February 2013, winning on his debut and collecting two more podiums across the weekend.

Staying with Fortec Motorsport for 2013, he entered the FIA Formula 3 European Championship. After mixed results, that included a second place finish, on 9 July 2013, Hill announced his decision to quit motor racing, citing a current lack of focus on motorsport and a desire to pursue other interests.

== Racing record ==
=== Career summary ===
Season	Series	Team	Races	Wins	Poles	F/Laps	Podiums	Points	Position
2008	Ginetta Junior Championship	Tollbar Racing	24	0	3	1	10	471	**3rd**
2008	Ginetta Junior Championship Winter Series	Tollbar Racing	4	2	4	3	4	133	**1st**
2009	British Formula Ford Championship	Jamun Racing	25	0	1	1	2	257	11th
2010	British Formula Ford Championship	Jamun Racing	25	4	3	2	12	444	5th
2010	Formula Renault 2.0 UK Winter Series	Manor Competition	6	0	0	0	1	85	9th
2011	Toyota Racing Series	ETEC Motorsport	12	0	0	0	0	368	13th
2011	Formula Renault 2.0 UK	Manor Competition	20	0	0	0	0	273	7th
2011	Formula Renault 2.0 NEC	Keerbergs Transport Racing	10	0	1	0	0	92	16th
2011	Formula Renault 2.0 UK Finals series	Fortec Motorsports	6	2	6	1	2	87	5th
2012	Toyota Racing Series	ETEC Motorsport	15	1	1	0	5	629	4th
2012	Formula Renault 2.0 NEC	Fortec Motorsports	20	5	1	3	7	311	**3rd**
2012	Formula Renault 2.0 Eurocup	Fortec Motorsports	4	0	0	0	0	8	25th
2012–13	MRF Challenge Formula 2000 Championship	MRF Racing	4	1	0	1	3	64	7th
2013	FIA Formula 3 European Championship	Fortec Motorsports	15	0	0	0	1	56	12th

=== Complete Ginetta Junior Championship results ===
(key) (Races in bold indicate pole position) (Races in italics indicate fastest lap)

Year	Entrant	1	2	3	4	5	6	7	8	9	10	11	12	13	14	15	16	17	18	19	20	21	22	23	24	DC	Points
2008	Tollbar Racing	BHI; 1; 8	BHI; 2; 13	CAD; 1; 3	CAD; 2; 4	ROC; 1; 7	ROC; 2; 4	**DON**; **1**; **3**	**DON**; **2**; **2**	THR; 1 Ret	THR; 2; 12	CRO; 1; 6	CRO; 2; 10	**SNE**; **1**; **3**	SNE; 2; 3	OUL; 1; 3	OUL; 2; 2	KNO; 1; 2	KNO; 2; 4	SIL; 1 Ret	SIL; 2; 2	MAL; 1; 2	MAL; 2; 4	BHI; 1; 6	BHI; 2; 4	3rd	471

=== Complete Ginetta Junior Championship Winter Series results ===
Year	Entrant	1	2	3	4	DC	Points
2008	Tollbar Racing	**SNE**; **1**; **1**	**SNE**; **2**; **3**	**ROC**; **1**; **2**	**ROC**; **2**; **1**	1st	133

=== Complete British Formula Ford results ===
(key) (Races in bold indicate pole position) (Races in italics indicate fastest lap)

Year	Entrant	1	2	3	4	5	6	7	8	9	10	11	12	13	14	15	16	17	18	19	20	21	22	23	24	25	DC	Points
2009	Jamun Racing	OUL; 1 Ret	OUL; 2; 7	OUL; 3; 8	ROC; 1 Ret	ROC; 2; 9	ROC; 3; 7	KNO; 1; 9	KNO; 2; 8	KNO; 3; 7	SNE; 1 Ret	SNE; 2; 13	SNE; 3; 14	DON; 1; 8	DON; 2; 17	DON; 3; 7	SIL; 1; 10	SIL; 2; 11	SIL; 3 Ret	BHI; 1 Ret	BHI; 2 Ret	**BHI**; **3**; **3**	BHGP; 1; 6	BHGP; 2; 9	CAS; 1; 3	CAS; 2; 6	11th	257
2010	Jamun Racing	OUL; 1; 6	OUL; 2 Ret	OUL; 3; 6	KNO; 1; 1	KNO; 2 Ret	KNO; 3; 2	**ZAN**; **1**; **Ret**	**ZAN**; **2**; **11**	CAS; 1; 3	CAS; 2; 2	ROC; 1; 8	ROC; 2; 7	SIL; 1; 3	SIL; 2; 2	**SIL**; **3**; **1**	SNE; 1 Ret	SNE; 2 Ret	BHI; 1; 3	BHI; 2; 1	BHI; 3; 2	DON; 1; 1	DON; 2; 1	DON; 3 Ret	BHGP; 1; 6	BHGP; 2; 8	5th	444

=== Complete Formula Renault 2.0 UK Winter Series results ===
(key) (Races in bold indicate pole position) (Races in italics indicate fastest lap)

Year	Entrant	1	2	3	4	5	6	DC	Points
2010	Manor Competition	SNE; 1; 7	SNE; 2 Ret	PEM; 1; 7	PEM; 2; 6	PEM; 1; 3	PEM; 2; 11	9th	85
2011	Fortec Motorsports	**SNE**; **1**; **9**	**SNE**; **2**; **Ret**	**SNE**; **1**; **1**	**SNE**; **2**; **14**	**ROC**; **1**; **Ret**	**ROC**; **2**; **1**	5th	87

=== Complete Formula Renault 2.0 UK results ===
Year	Entrant	1	2	3	4	5	6	7	8	9	10	11	12	13	14	15	16	17	18	19	20	DC	Points
2011	Manor Competition	BHI; 1; 9	BHI; 2; 7	DON; 1; 6	DON; 2; 7	THR; 1; 11	THR; 2; 4	OUL; 1; 8	OUL; 2; 7	CRO; 1; 4	CRO; 2 Ret	SNE; 1; 8	SNE; 2; 5	SIL; 1; 11	SIL; 2; 12	ROC; 1 Ret	ROC; 2 Ret	BHI; 1; 8	BHI; 2; 6	SIL; 1; 8	SIL; 2; 5	7th	273

=== Complete Toyota Racing Series results ===
(key) (Races in bold indicate pole position) (Races in italics indicate fastest lap)

Year	Entrant	1	2	3	4	5	6	7	8	9	10	11	12	13	14	15	DC	Points
2011	ETEC Motorsport	TER; 1 Ret	HOC; 2; 12	HOC; 3; 10	TIM; 1 Ret	TIM; 2; 13	TIM; 3; 8	HAM; 1; 9	HAM; 2; 8	HAM; 3; 9	MAN; 1; 12	MAN; 2; 5	MAN; 3; 4	TAU; 1	TAU; 2	TAU; 3	13th	368
2012	ETEC Motorsport	TER; 1; 1	HOC; 2; 13	HOC; 3; 6	TIM; 1; 3	TIM; 2; 7	TIM; 3; 18	TAU; 2; 2	**TAU**; **1**; **13**	TAU; 2; 2	HAM; 2; 7	HAM; 1 Ret	HAM; 2; 4	MAN; 3; 5	MAN; 3; 3	MAN; 3 Ret	4th	629

=== Complete Formula Renault 2.0 NEC results ===
(key) (Races in bold indicate pole position) (Races in italics indicate fastest lap)

Year	Entrant	1	2	3	4	5	6	7	8	9	10	11	12	13	14	15	16	17	18	19	20	DC	Points
2011	Keerbergs Transport Racing	HOC; 1	HOC; 2	HOC; 3	SPA; 1	SPA; 2	NÜR; 1	NÜR; 2	ASS; 1	ASS; 2	ASS; 3	OSC; 1; 6	OSC; 2 Ret	ZAN; 1; 4	ZAN; 2 Ret	MST; 1; 6	MST; 2; 6	**MST**; **3**; **Ret**	MNZ; 1; 7	MNZ; 2 Ret	MNZ; 3; 5	16th	92
2012	Fortec Motorsports	HOC; 1 Ret	HOC; 2; 3	HOC; 3; 25	NÜR; 1; 6	NÜR; 2; 4	OSC; 1; 1	OSC; 2; 1	OSC; 3; 2	ASS; 1; 25	ASS; 2; 5	RBR; 1; 7	RBR; 2; 4	**MST**; **1**; **1**	MST; 2 Ret	MST; 3; 6	ZAN; 1; 1	ZAN; 2 Ret	ZAN; 3; 6	SPA; 1; 1	SPA; 2; 12	3rd	311

=== Complete Eurocup Formula Renault 2.0 results ===
(key) (Races in bold indicate pole position; races in italics indicate fastest lap)

Year	Entrant	1	2	3	4	5	6	7	8	9	10	11	12	13	14	DC	Points
2012	Fortec Motorsports	ALC; 1	ALC; 2	SPA; 1 Ret	SPA; 2; 7	NÜR; 1	NÜR; 2	MSC; 1	MSC; 2	HUN; 1	HUN; 2	LEC; 1	LEC; 2	CAT; 1; 9	CAT; 2 Ret	25th	8

=== Complete MRF Challenge results ===
(key) (Races in bold indicate pole position) (Races in italics indicate fastest lap)

Year	1	2	3	4	5	6	7	8	9	10	DC	Points
2012–13	BIC; 1	BIC; 2	BIC; 1	BIC; 2	BIC; 3	BIC; 4	MAD; 1; 1	MAD; 2; 6	MAD; 3; 3	MAD; 4; 3	7th	64

=== Complete FIA Formula 3 European Championship results ===
(key) (Races in bold indicate pole position; races in italics indicate fastest lap)

Year	Entrant	1	2	3	4	5	6	7	8	9	10	11	12	13	14	15	16	17	18	19	20	21	22	23	24	25	26	27	28	29	30	DC	Points
2013	Fortec Motorsport	MNZ; 1; 23	MNZ; 2; 8	MNZ; 3; 12	SIL; 1 Ret	SIL; 2; 7	SIL; 3 Ret	HOC; 1; 6	HOC; 2; 2	HOC; 3; 13	BRH; 1; 8	BRH; 2; 8	BRH; 3; 13	RBR; 1 Ret	RBR; 2; 5	RBR; 3; 12	NOR; 1	NOR; 2	NOR; 3	NÜR; 1	NÜR; 2	NÜR; 3	ZAN; 1	ZAN; 2	ZAN; 3	VAL; 1	VAL; 2	VAL; 3	HOC; 1	HOC; 2	HOC; 3	12th	56

Sporting positions
Preceded by Inaugural	Ginetta Junior Winter Series champion 2008	Succeeded by Aaron Williamson
