= James Cole (racing driver) =

British racing driver (born 1988)

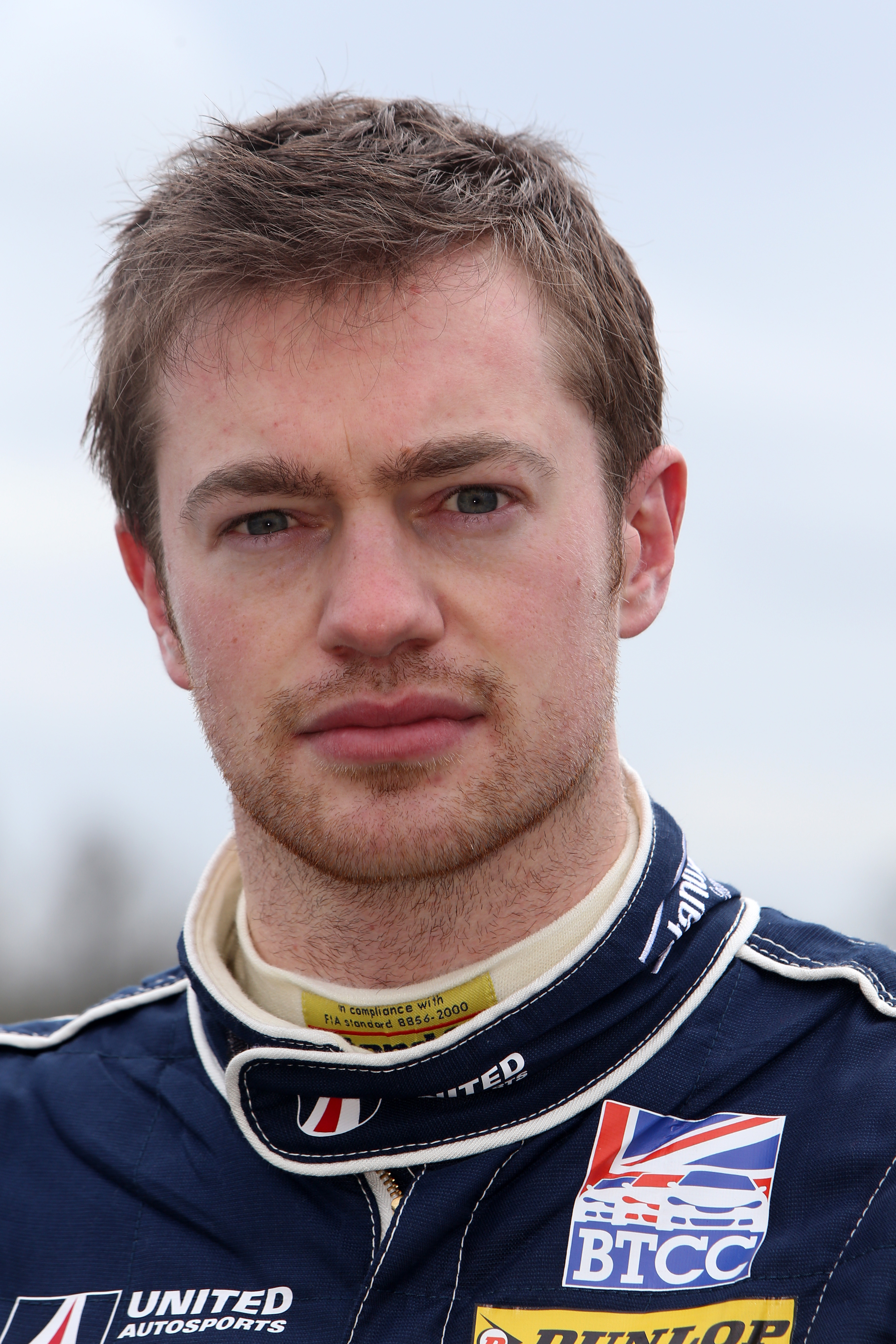
- Cole in 2014
- Nationality: (United Kingdom) British
- Born: 16 August 1988 (age 38) Southport, England

British Touring Car Championship career
- Debut season: 2013
- Current team: Team Shredded Wheat Racing with Gallagher
- Car number: 20
- Former teams: RCIB Insurance Racing, United Autosports, Adrian Flux Subaru Racing
- Starts: 145
- Wins: 1
- Poles: 1
- Fastest laps: 2
- Best finish: 16th in 2017

Previous series
- 2011 2010 2009 2008–09 2007: FIA Formula Two Championship; British Formula 3 Formula BMW Pacific; British Formula Ford; BRSCC North West Formula Ford

Championship titles
- 2009 2007: British Formula Ford; BRSCC North West Formula Ford

James Cole (born 16 August 1988) is a British racing driver from Southport, Merseyside. He made his British Touring Car Championship debut in 2013.

== Career ==
=== Formula Ford ===
Cole began his racing career in 2007, taking part in BRSCC North West Formula Ford. He won this regional championship, and in 2008 moved to the main British Formula Ford Championship. He finished tenth. He continued another year in the series, and won the 2009 championship, taking seven wins and fifteen podiums in the twenty-four races.

Cole was nominated for the 2009 McLaren Autosport BRDC Award.

=== British Formula 3 ===
Cole changed series to the British Formula 3 National Class for the 2010 season, driving for T-Sport alongside Alex Brundle and Menasheh Idafar. He finished second in the class.

=== Formula Two ===
Cole moved to Formula Two for the start of the 2011 season with British Formula 3 teammate Brundle.

=== British Touring Car Championship ===
==== Tony Gilham Racing (2013) ====
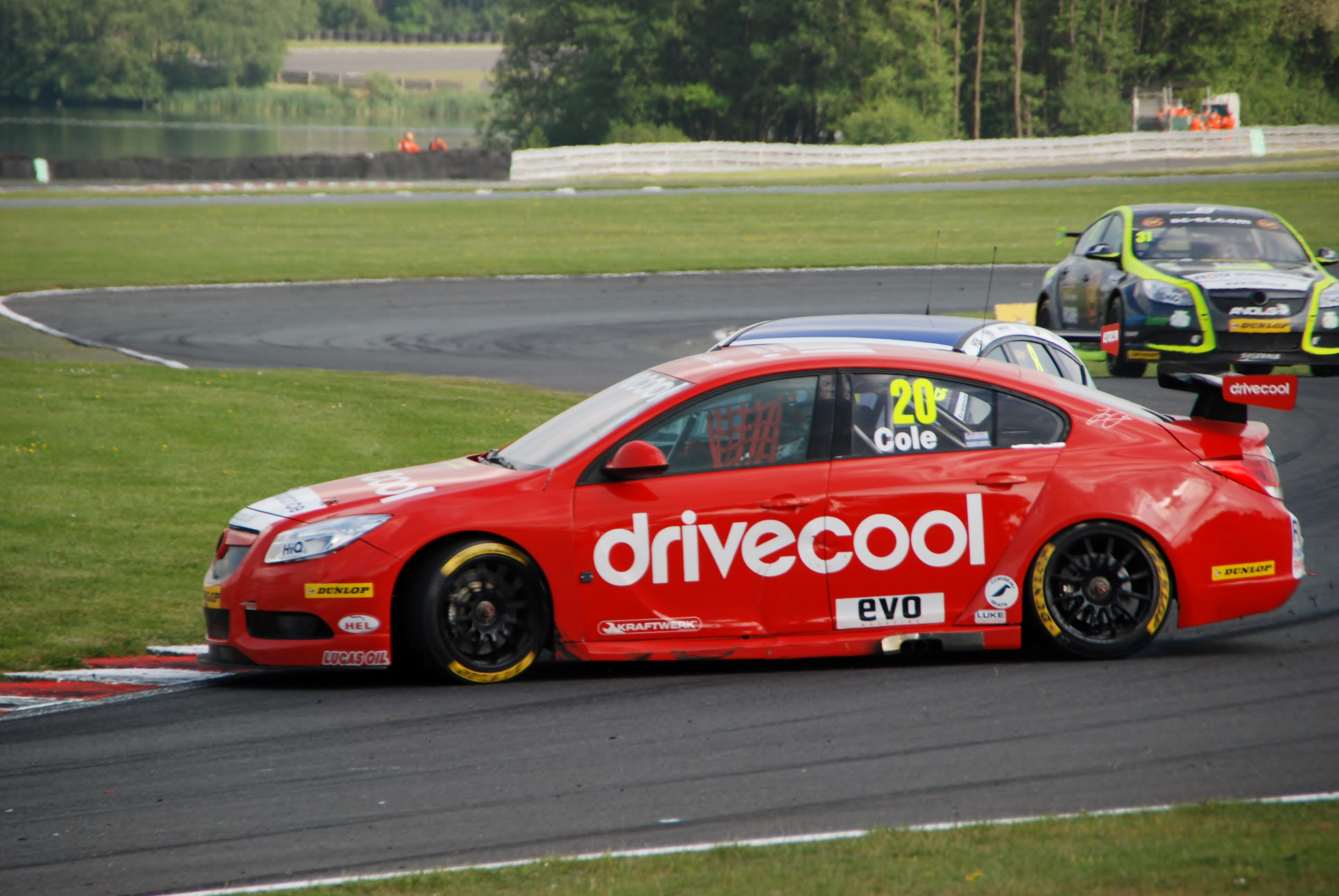
Cole driving the Team HARD Vauxhall Insignia at Oulton Park during the 2013 British Touring Car Championship season.

After a year out of racing, Cole joined Team HARD. for the 2013 British Touring Car Championship season to drive an NGTC Vauxhall Insignia. He was allowed to drive the car for the first time on the Friday before the Brands Hatch round to shake down the car. In July 2013, Cole announced he had left Team HARD. to focus on securing a drive for 2014.

==== United Autosports (2014–) ====
For the 2014 British Touring Car Championship season, Cole joined United Autosports who would be making their debut in the series.

== Racing record ==
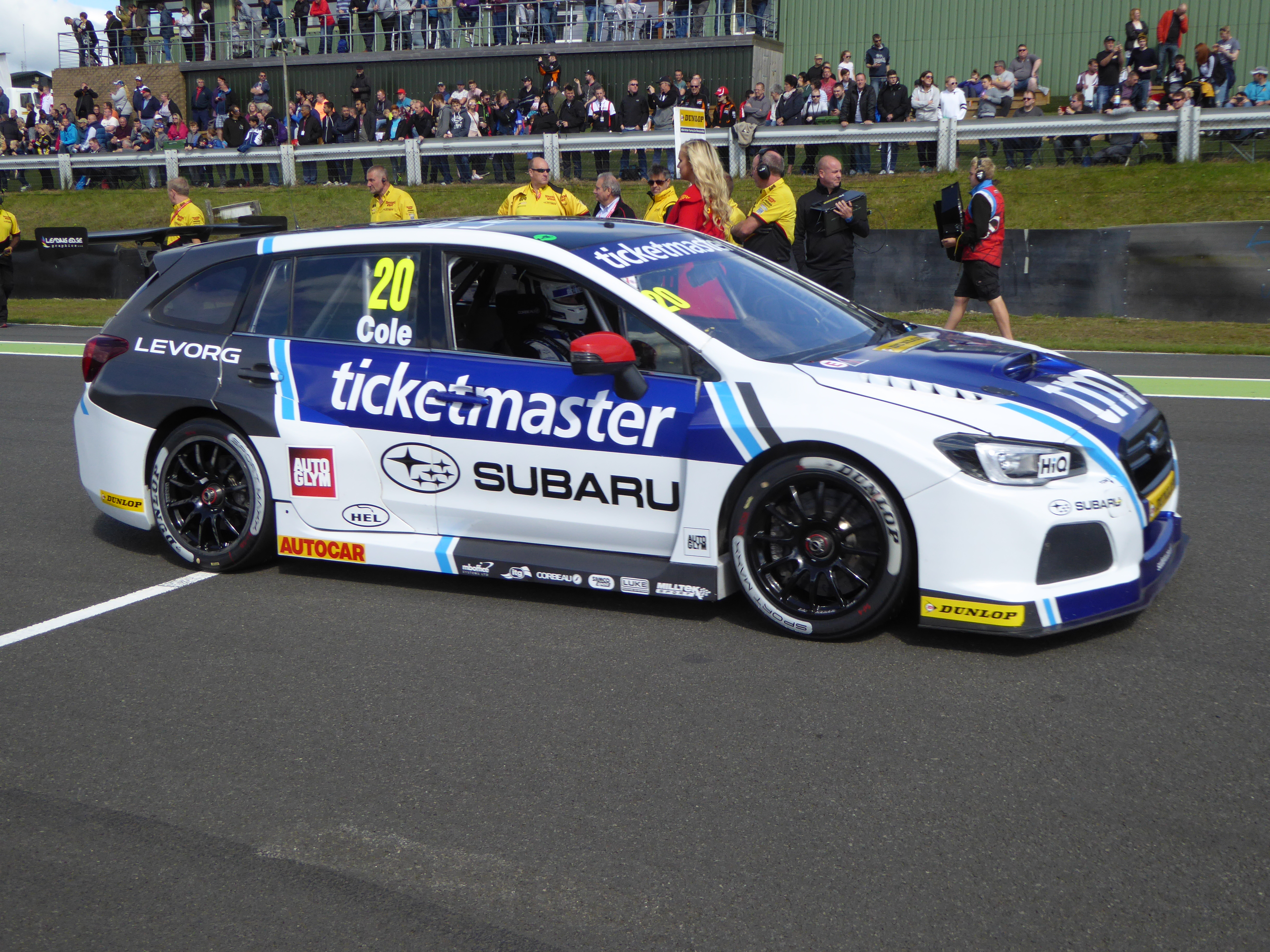
Cole, at the Knockhill round of the 2017 British Touring Car Championship.

=== Career summary ===
Season	Series	Team	Races	Wins	Poles	F/Laps	Podiums	Points	Position
2006	Formula Ford Festival – Kent class	MedinaSport	1	0	0	0	0	N/A	17th
2007	BRSCC North West Formula Ford	MedinaSport	?	?	?	?	?	178	**1st**
2007	Formula Ford 1600 Walter Hayes Trophy	MedinaSport	1	0	0	0	0	N/A	17th
2007	Formula Ford Festival – Kent class	MedinaSport	1	0	0	0	0	N/A	5th
2008	British Formula Ford Championship	Jamun Racing	24	0	0	0	0	267	10th
2008	Formula Ford Festival – Duratec – Pre finals		2	0	0	1	1	N/A	N/A
2008	Formula Ford Festival – Duratec class		1	0	0	0	0	N/A	6th
2009	British Formula Ford Championship	Jamun Racing	24	7	5	6	15	597	**1st**
2009	Formula Ford Festival – Duratec – Pre finals		2	1	0	0	2	N/A	N/A
2009	Formula Ford Festival – Duratec class		1	0	0	1	1	N/A	**3rd**
2009	Formula BMW Pacific	Eurasia Motorsport	1	0	0	0	0	0	NC†
2010	British Formula 3 International Series	T-Sport	30	11	5	7	29	418	**2nd**
2011	FIA Formula Two Championship	MotorSport Vision	16	0	0	0	0	6	20th
2013	British Touring Car Championship	RCIB Insurance Racing	15	0	0	0	0	11	21st
2014	British Touring Car Championship	United Autosports	30	0	0	1	0	5	26th
2015	British Touring Car Championship	Motorbase Performance	15	0	0	0	0	32	19th
2016	British Touring Car Championship	Silverline Subaru BMR Racing	27	0	0	1	0	15	25th
2017	British Touring Car Championship	Adrian Flux Subaru Racing	30	1	1	0	1	79	16th
2018	British Touring Car Championship	Team Shredded Wheat Racing with Gallagher	30	0	0	0	0	67	21st

^{†} As Cole was a guest driver, he was ineligible to score points.

=== Complete FIA Formula Two Championship results ===
(key)

Year	1	2	3	4	5	6	7	8	9	10	11	12	13	14	15	16	Pos	Points
2011	SIL; 1; 15	SIL; 2; 13	MAG; 1; 18	MAG; 2; 17	SPA; 1; 16	SPA; 2; 16	NÜR; 1; 18	NÜR; 2; 14	BRH; 1; 8	BRH; 2; 12	RBR; 1; 9	RBR; 2; 18	MON; 1; 14	MON; 2; 15	CAT; 1; 14	CAT; 2; 15	20th	6

=== Complete British Touring Car Championship results ===
(key) (Races in bold indicate pole position – 1 point awarded just in first race; races in italics indicate fastest lap – 1 point awarded all races; * signifies that driver lead race for at least one lap – 1 point given all races)

Year	Team	Car	1	2	3	4	5	6	7	8	9	10	11	12	13	14	15	16	17	18	19	20	21	22	23	24	25	26	27	28	29	30	Pos	Pts
2013	RCIB Insurance Racing	Vauxhall Insignia	BRH; 1 Ret	BRH; 2; 13	BRH; 3 Ret	DON; 1; 22	DON; 2; 18	DON; 3; 17	THR; 1; 17	THR; 2; 14	THR; 3; 14	OUL; 1; 18	OUL; 2; 17	OUL; 3; 13	CRO; 1 NC	CRO; 2 Ret	CRO; 3; 15	SNE; 1	SNE; 2	SNE; 3	KNO; 1	KNO; 2	KNO; 3	ROC; 1	ROC; 2	ROC; 3	SIL; 1	SIL; 2	SIL; 3	BRH; 1	BRH; 2	BRH; 3	21st	11
2014	United Autosports	Toyota Avensis	BRH; 1 Ret	BRH; 2; 17	BRH; 3; 14	DON; 1; 27	DON; 2 Ret	DON; 3 DNS	THR; 1 Ret	THR; 2; 20	THR; 3 Ret	OUL; 1; 19	OUL; 2; 15	OUL; 3; 20	CRO; 1; 21	CRO; 2; 18	CRO; 3; 15	SNE; 1; 22	SNE; 2; 20	SNE; 3; 25	KNO; 1 Ret	KNO; 2; 25	KNO; 3; 22	ROC; 1 Ret	ROC; 2; 23	ROC; 3 Ret	SIL; 1; 19	SIL; 2; 19	SIL; 3 Ret	BRH; 1 Ret	BRH; 2 Ret	BRH; 3; 19	26th	5
2015	Motorbase Performance	Ford Focus ST	BRH; 1	BRH; 2	BRH; 3	DON; 1	DON; 2	DON; 3	THR; 1	THR; 2	THR; 3	OUL; 1	OUL; 2	OUL; 3	CRO; 1	CRO; 2	CRO; 3	SNE; 1; 21	SNE; 2; 11	SNE; 3 Ret	KNO; 1; 17	KNO; 2; 17	KNO; 3; 20	ROC; 1; 11	ROC; 2; 17	ROC; 3; 15	SIL; 1; 17	SIL; 2; 10	**SIL**; **3**; 9	BRH; 1; 12	BRH; 2; 12	BRH; 3; 18	19th	32
2016	Silverline Subaru BMR Racing	Subaru Levorg GT	BRH; 1; 25	BRH; 2; 19	BRH; 3; 18	DON; 1 Ret	DON; 2 DNS	DON; 3 DNS	THR; 1 WD	THR; 2 WD	THR; 3 WD	OUL; 1; 18	OUL; 2 Ret	OUL; 3 Ret	CRO; 1 Ret	CRO; 2 Ret	CRO; 3; 21	SNE; 1; 10	SNE; 2 Ret	SNE; 3; 19	KNO; 1; 15	KNO; 2; 21	KNO; 3; 13	ROC; 1; 22	ROC; 2; 12	ROC; 3; 18	SIL; 1 Ret	SIL; 2; 23	SIL; 3; 21	BRH; 1; 23	BRH; 2; 21	BRH; 3; 16	25th	15
2017	Adrian Flux Subaru Racing	Subaru Levorg GT	BRH; 1 Ret	BRH; 2; 21	BRH; 3 Ret	DON; 1 Ret	DON; 2; 24	DON; 3; 22	THR; 1; 27	THR; 2; 28	THR; 3; 26	OUL; 1; 23	OUL; 2 Ret	OUL; 3 NC	CRO; 1 Ret	CRO; 2; 16	CRO; 3 Ret	SNE; 1; 15	SNE; 2; 8	**SNE**; **3**; 5	KNO; 1; 5	KNO; 2; 5	KNO; 3; 5	**ROC**; **1**; 1*	**ROC**; **2**; 13	ROC; 3 Ret	SIL; 1; 17	SIL; 2; 21	SIL; 3; 15	BRH; 1; 19	BRH; 2; 22	BRH; 3; 26	16th	79
2018	Team Shredded Wheat Racing with Gallagher	Ford Focus RS	BRH; 1; 9	BRH; 2; 19	BRH; 3 Ret	DON; 1; 5	DON; 2; 6	DON; 3 Ret	THR; 1; 19	THR; 2 Ret	THR; 3; 24	OUL; 1; 7	OUL; 2; 5	OUL; 3; 9	CRO; 1; 12	CRO; 2; 23	CRO; 3; 20	SNE; 1; 17	SNE; 2; 18	SNE; 3 Ret	ROC; 1; 19	ROC; 2; 19	ROC; 3 Ret	KNO; 1; 24	KNO; 2; 18	KNO; 3; 22	SIL; 1; 21	SIL; 2; 28	SIL; 3; 20	BRH; 1; 10	BRH; 2; 16	BRH; 3; 14	21st	67
