= Joe Tandy =

British racing driver

- Nationality: British
- Born: Joseph Tandy; 1 January 1983 Bedford, UK
- Died: 13 May 2009 (aged 26) Bromham, UK
- Relatives: Nick Tandy (brother)

Previous series
- 2008 2005 2004 2001–04 1994–99: Formula Ford Benelux; Formula Palmer Audi; TVR Tuscan Challenge; Mini Seven Challenge; Ministox

Championship titles
- 2005 2005 2004: Formula Palmer Audi; Graham Hill Memorial Trophy; Walter Hayes Memorial

Awards
- 2005: BRDC Rising Star

Joseph Tandy (1 January 1983 – 13 May 2009) was a British racing driver and team owner. He won the 2005 Formula Palmer Audi championship and was awarded a BRDC Rising Star in the same year. Tandy later founded his own team, JTR, which he ran until his death in a car crash.

== Career ==
=== Driver ===
Tandy started his racing career unusually in short oval Ministox machinery in 1994. However, by the end of 1998, Tandy had won 45 races, with 60 other podium placings as he became both British and World Ministox champion, as well as being a three-time East Anglian Ministox champion. He continued in this level of motorsport in 1999, winning another 28 races to become British champion for the second time.

After a year off in 2000, Tandy took up circuit racing by moving into the Mini Seven Challenge in 2001. He competed in four seasons in the championship, picking up ten podiums, including three wins, all coming in 2004. He also won the Walter Hayes Memorial Trophy towards the end of the season. Tandy also took part in the Oulton Park round of the 2004 TVR Tuscan Challenge.

After finishing college and completing an engineering apprenticeship, Tandy began working as a technician for Jonathan Palmer's Palmersport corporate driving days concern. His engineering acumen elevated him to chief mechanic by the age of 22, while his racing career continued to go from strength to strength. This allowed him to test a Formula Palmer Audi car at Palmer's Bedford Autodrome, where he set a new lap record of 1:04.2 for the 1.8-mile West Circuit, breaking Justin Wilson's long established record from 1998. This gave him an incentive to sell his 70 bhp Mini and move up into the 350 bhp single-seaters.

Tandy had an impressive season in the championship, eventually winning the title on countback ahead of David Epton. Tandy and Epton had both finished on 284 points, but Tandy won the title thanks to six wins compared to Epton's four. This championship-winning campaign earned him one of the six nominations for the McLaren Autosport BRDC Award. At the time, Tandy was looking to move into the Atlantic Championship Series in the United States. He later tested for Walker Racing ahead of the 2007 season.

=== Team owner ===
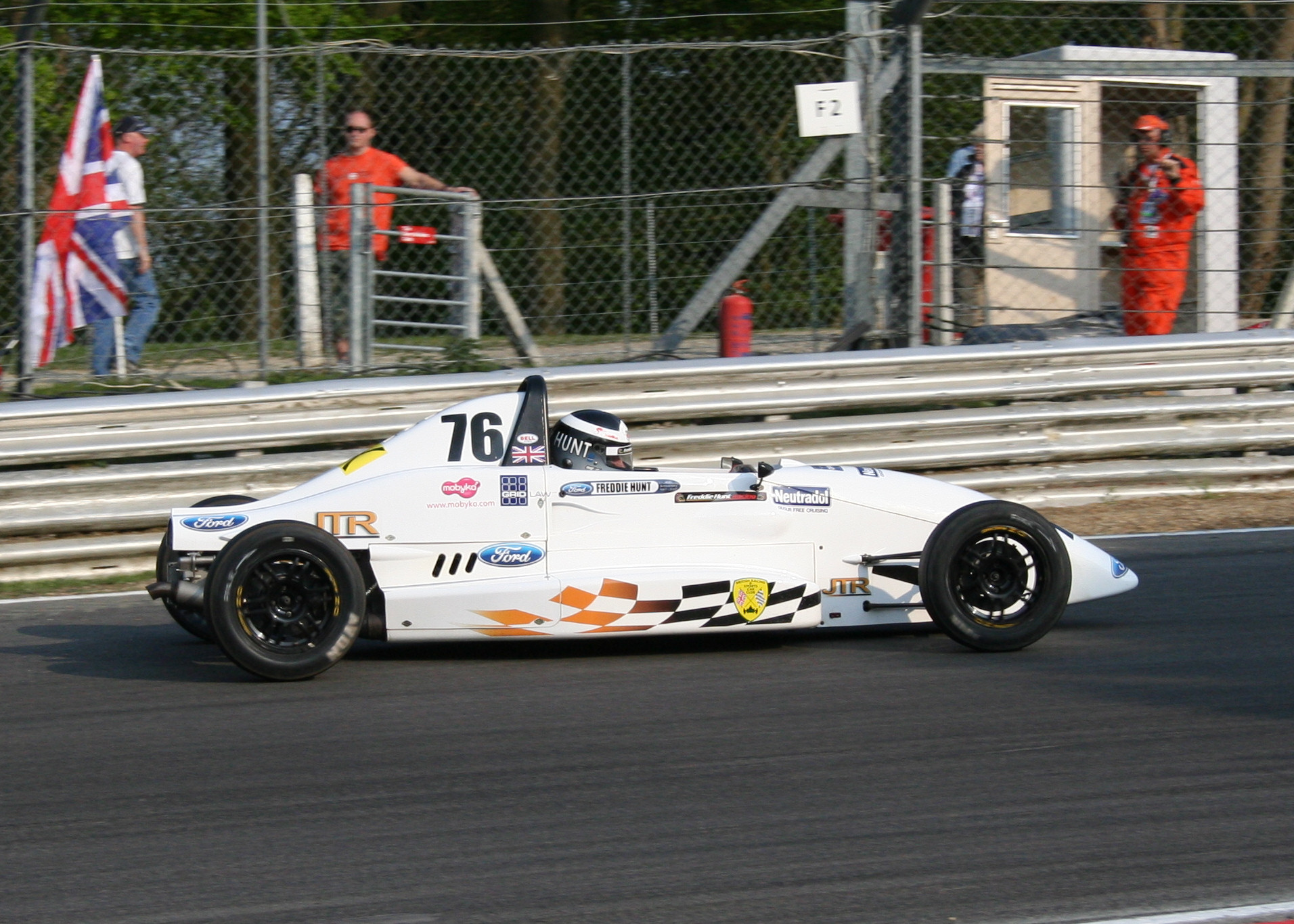
Freddie Hunt driving a Joe Tandy Racing run Formula Ford in 2007

Tandy's racing career somewhat stalled after that, before founding Joe Tandy Racing in mid-2006. Brother Nick had been struggling with his Ray car lacking upgrades, but Joe decided to buy a similar chassis and run Nick for the rest of the campaign. The success was immediate, as Nick won first time out at Thruxton, and added another win at the championship finale at Castle Combe, as he finished runner-up in the championship standings. An on-the-road win at the 2006 Formula Ford Festival would have capped an amazing year for JTR, however Nick was penalised for a safety car misdemeanour, dropping him to fifth.

The Tandys then expanded the team to three cars in 2007, with Nick, Freddie Hunt (son of 1976 Formula One world champion James Hunt) and Daniel Murray driving the Ray machines. Nick won six races en route to third in the championship, twelve points behind runner-up James Nash. After their Formula Ford Festival win was taken away the year before, Nick won the race in 2007, after Callum MacLeod was given a two-second time penalty for braking severely while leading under the safety car.

To aid with his brother's rise through the motorsport ranks, Joe bought a Mygale Formula Three chassis for a campaign in the British Formula Three Championship. He also moved his Formula Ford team onto the French company's chassis. Tandy managed to turn the Mygale into a regular frontrunner, railing against the established Dallara hordes with a small operation and a meagre budget. Despite missing the rounds in Bucharest, Nick managed to finish ninth overall in the championship, with three podiums coming at Spa, Silverstone and Donington. In Formula Ford, despite not achieving any wins, Matt Hamilton finished as JTR's best driver with sixth overall.

2009 saw new chassis again for both the Formula Three team and the Formula Ford team, as JTR became the de facto lead team for Mygale in both series, as Ultimate Motorsport pulled out of Formula Three before the start of the 2009 season. Nick started in fine form with a double podium at the season-opening rounds at Oulton Park, and just eighteen days after his brother's death, took the team's first win at Rockingham. Meanwhile, in Formula Fords, Josef Newgarden and Liroy Stuart were signed to campaign the cars, with Newgarden winning the third round of the championship, again at Oulton Park. JTR continued racing despite founder Joe's death.

== Personal life ==
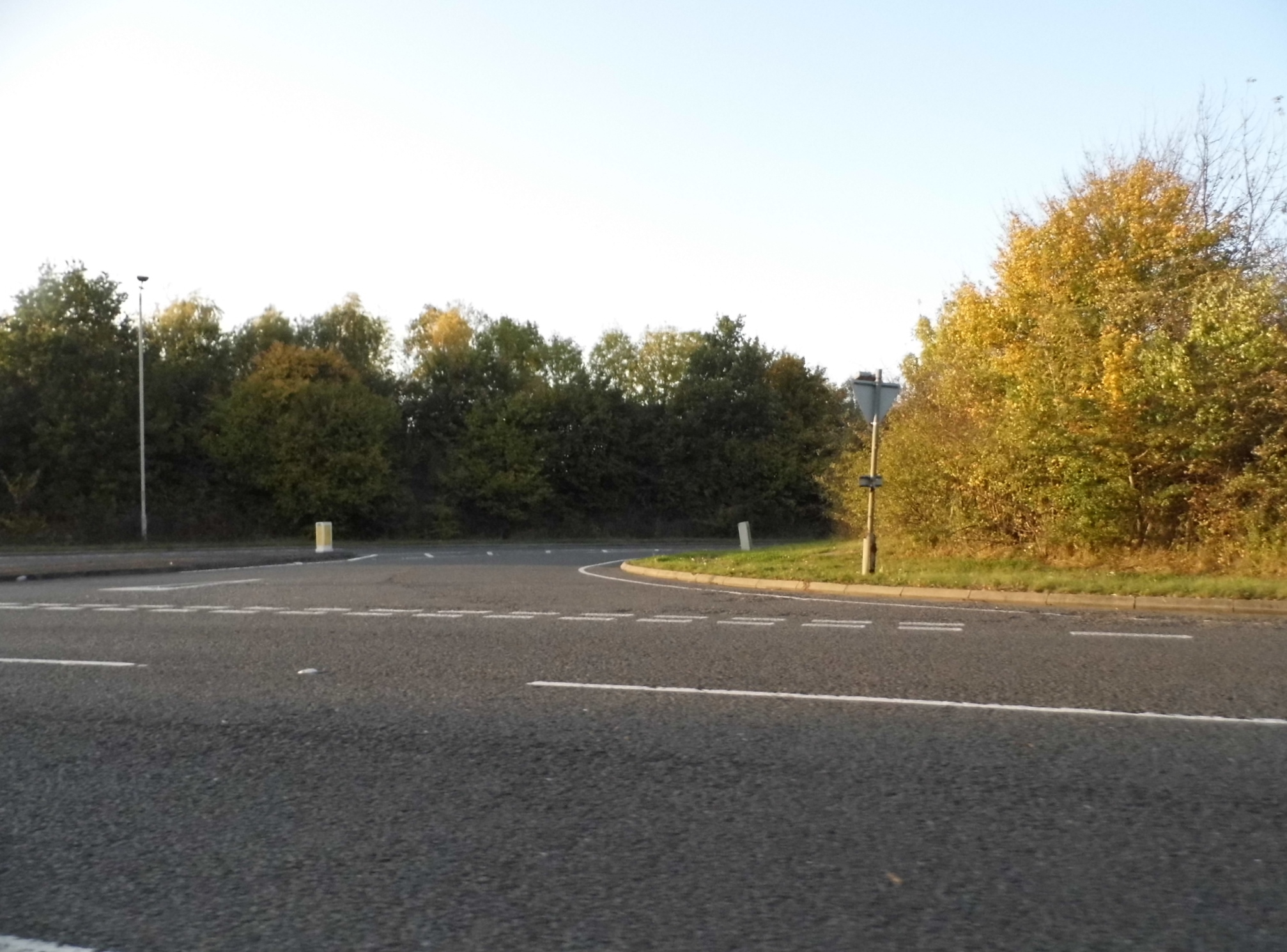
Sliproad junction on the A428 where Tandy's fatal accident occurred

Tandy was born in Bedford to parents Joe and Marilyn Tandy. His younger brother is Nick Tandy a successful racing driver who drove for Joe's team, JTR. At the time of his death, Tandy was engaged to be married to Sophie Temple.

=== Death ===
Tandy was travelling with his fiancée Sophie Temple's brother, Luke Temple, in his BMW 5 Series towards Bedford, when a collision between the BMW and a DAF box van occurred at around 12:25 local time, at the junction of the A428 and the Box End Road just outside Bromham. Tandy died at the scene, while Temple was airlifted to Addenbrooke's Hospital in Cambridge, where he later died due to serious head injuries sustained in the crash. The van driver, who suffered minor injuries, was cleared of all charges at court, after it was found that Tandy had been driving a car with a faulty braking system; at speeds of around 117mph; and while nearly two times over the drink drive limit.

Tributes to Tandy were paid by former boss Jonathan Palmer, Sam Roach the director of the British Formula Ford Championship the SRO Motorsports Group and the Mini Se7en Racing Club.

Tandy's funeral took place on June 1, 2009, at St Peters Parish Church in Pavenham.

In January 2010, Tandy's family setup a racing academy in his name to support the next generation of racing talent.

== Career summary ==
Season	Series	Team	Races	Wins	Poles	F/Laps	Podiums	Points	Position
2002	Mini Se7en Challenge		9	0	0	0	0	137	4th
2003	Mini Se7en Challenge		11	0	0	0	0	51	19th
2004	Mini Se7en Challenge		8	2	0	1	5	126	4th
2005	Formula Palmer Audi		15	6	2	5	11	284	1st
2008	Formula Ford Benelux		2	0	0	0	0	16	20th

Sporting positions
Preceded by Jonathan Kennard	Formula Palmer Audi; Champion; 2005	Succeeded by Jon Barnes
