= Enigma Motorsport =

Enigma Motorsport is a British racing car team founded by racing driver Linton Stutely and engineer Thomas Farquhar.

Formed in 2008 they have prepared Formula Ford racing cars for the British Formula Ford Championship. Their most successful year was in 2010 with Finnish driver, Antti Buri claiming several podium finishes. They also ran a car in the Finnish Formula Ford championship in partnership with LMS Racing, with Buri becoming the 2010 Finnish Formula Ford Championship champion.

In 2011 they ran a Mygale chassis for Philippe Layac.
