= John Lewis (disambiguation) =

John Lewis (1940–2020) was an American politician and civil rights leader from Georgia.

John Lewis may also refer to:

== People ==
=== Academics ===
- John Lewis (computer scientist) (born 1963), American computer science educator and author
- John Lewis (headmaster) (born 1942), New Zealand headmaster of Eton College
- John Lewis (philosopher) (1889–1976), British Unitarian minister and Marxist philosopher
- John David Lewis (1955–2012), American political scientist, historian, and Objectivist scholar
- John S. Lewis (born 1941), American professor of planetary science at the University of Arizona's Lunar and Planetary Laboratory
- John T. Lewis (1932–2004), Welsh mathematical physicist
- John Wilson Lewis (1930–2017), American political scientist

=== Businesspeople ===
- John Lewis (brewer) (1713–1792), British brewer
- John Lewis (department store founder) (1836–1928), British draper and founder of the John Lewis department store
- John Spedan Lewis (1885–1963), British industrial democracy pioneer, founder of the John Lewis Partnership
- Sir John Lewis (businessman) (born 1940), British businessman, solicitor and charity executive
- John Allen Lewis (1819–1895), American newspaper editor

=== Clergy ===
- John Lewis (antiquarian, born 1675) (1675–1747), English clergyman
- John Lewis (antiquarian and diarist) (1685–1761), English clergyman
- John Lewis (archbishop of Ontario) (1825–1901), Anglican bishop, archbishop and author in Canada
- John Lewis (archdeacon of Cheltenham) (1934–2024), British Anglican priest
- John Lewis (archdeacon of Hereford) (1909–1984), Anglican priest
- John Lewis (archdeacon of North-West Europe) (1939–1994), Archdeacon of North West Europe from 1982 to 1993
- John Lewis (bishop of North Queensland) (1926–2015), Australian Anglican bishop
- John Lewis (dean of Llandaff) (1947–2019), Welsh Anglican priest
- John Lewis (dean of Ossory) (1717–1783), Dean of Ossory in Ireland from 1755 to 1783

=== Musicians ===
- John Lewis (electronic musician) (died c. 1984), Canadian-British electronic music composer
- John Lewis (pianist) (1920–2001), American jazz pianist and composer with the Modern Jazz Quartet
- John Lewis (singer) (born 1947), British singer and multi-instrumentalist known professionally as Jona Lewie

=== Politicians ===
==== American politicians ====
- John Lewis (1940–2020), member of US House of Representatives from Georgia
- John Lewis (Arizona politician) (born 1957), businessman and mayor of Gilbert, Arizona
- John Lewis (California politician) (born 1954), American politician from California
- John Lewis (Florida politician) (born 1949), American politician from Florida
- John L. Lewis (politician) (1800–1886), mayor of New Orleans
- John Wood Lewis Sr. (1801–1865), Confederate States of America senator
- John Lewis (Shawnee leader) (c. 1760 – 1826), Native American leader of the Shawnee in Lewistown, Ohio
- John F. Lewis (1818–1895), US senator from Virginia
- John H. Lewis (1830–1929), US representative from Illinois
- John V. Lewis (died 1913), Ohio state senator
- John W. Lewis (1841–1913), US representative from Kentucky
- John W. Lewis Jr. (1906–1977), Illinois secretary of state

==== Australian politicians ====
- John Lewis (Australian politician) (1844–1923), South Australian pastoralist and politician

==== British politicians ====
- John Lewis (of Abernant) (1580–?), Welsh MP
- John Lewis (Radnor MP) (1738–1797), Welsh MP for New Radnor
- Harvey Lewis (politician) (John Harvey Lewis, 1814–1888), Irish-born lawyer and Liberal MP
- John Delaware Lewis (1828–1884), English Liberal Party MP
- J. H. Lewis (John H. Lewis, 1908–1976), English landowner and councillor
- John Lewis (British politician) (1912–1969), British Labour Party MP

==== Canadian politicians ====
- John Lewis (Canadian senator) (1858–1935), newspaper editor and senator
- John Lewis (New Brunswick politician) (1804–1888), judge and politician
- John Lewis (Newfoundland politician) (1867–1922), politician in Newfoundland
- John Bower Lewis (1817–1874), politician in Ottawa

=== Sportspeople ===
- John Lewis (cricketer) (1867–1939), Australian cricketer
- John Lewis (footballer, born 1881) (1881–1954), Welsh international football player
- John Lewis (footballer, born 1949), Australian rules footballer for Hawthorn
- John Lewis (footballer, born 1953) (1953–2024), Australian rules footballer for Fitzroy
- John Lewis (footballer, born 1954), English football player for Orient
- John Lewis (footballer, born 1955), Welsh football player and manager
- John Lewis (referee) (1855–1926), English football player, administrator, referee and co-founder of Blackburn Rovers F.C.
- John Lewis (weightlifter) (born 1943), Canadian Olympic weightlifter
- John Goulstone Lewis (1859–1935), Welsh international rugby union player
- John Henry Lewis (1914–1974), American boxer and world light heavyweight champion
- Buddy Lewis (John Kelly Lewis, 1916–2011), American baseball player
- John Lewis (pitcher) (fl. 1945), American Negro league pitcher
- John Lewis (sprinter), winner of the 300 yards at the 1930 USA Indoor Track and Field Championships
- John Lewis III, sprinter and winner of the 2017 and 2018 NCAA Division I 4 × 100 m relay championships
- John Lewis (runner), middle-distance runner, 2018 indoor 800 m All-American for the Clemson Tigers track and field team

=== Other people ===
- John Lewis (Virginia colonist) (1678–1762), Virginia pioneer and father of General Andrew Lewis and Thomas Lewis the Virginia politicaion
- John Lewis (criminal) (died 1910), American gangster from New York City, known as Spanish Louie
- John Lewis (journalist) (born 1933), Australian journalist
- John Lewis (Nebraska activist) (c. 1841–?), hotelier, musician, and civil rights activist in Omaha, Nebraska
- John Lewis (typographer) (1912–1996), British typographer and illustrator
- John Frederick Lewis (1805–1876), English Orientalist painter
- John L. Lewis (1880–1969), American labor leader
- John P. Lewis (1921–2010), American academic and presidential advisor
- John Percy Leon Lewis (1943–2020), Guyanese military officer
- John Randolph Lewis (1834–1900), American dentist, soldier, administrator, and postmaster
- John Taylor Lewis (1894–1983), American army officer
- F. John Lewis (1916–1993), American surgeon
- John Penry Lewis (1854–1923), British colonial administrator
- John Lewis (judge) (1917–1993), Southern Rhodesian and Zimbabwean lawyer and judge

== Other ==
- John Lewis & Partners, a chain of department stores in the United Kingdom
- John Lewis Partnership, a United Kingdom holding company.
- USNS John Lewis, lead ship of a class of US military tankers

== See also ==
- Lenell John-Lewis (born 1989), English footballer
- Jack Lewis (disambiguation)
- John R. Lewis (disambiguation)
- Johnny Lewis (disambiguation)
- Jon Lewis (disambiguation)
- Jonathan Lewis (disambiguation)
- John Louis (disambiguation)
