= Jonathan Lewis =

Jonathan Lewis may refer to:

== Entertainment ==
- Jonathan Guy Lewis (born 1963), English actor
- Johnny Lewis (1983–2012), American actor
- Jonathan Lewis (artist) (born 1970), visual artist

== Sports ==
- Jonathan Lewis (American football) (born 1984), American football player
- Jonathan Lewis (soccer) (born 1997), American soccer player
- Jonathan Lewis (motorsport), driver and manager
- Jon Lewis (cricketer, born 1970), English player and coach

== Other ==
- Jonathan Lewis (oncologist) (born 1959), oncologist and cancer drug developer
- Jonathan Lewis (2006–2023), American murder victim
- Jonathan Lewis (died c. 1820), alleged murderer of Omie Wise

== See also ==
- Jon Lewis (disambiguation)
- John Lewis (disambiguation)
