= 2008 British Formula Ford Championship =

Seasons
- ← 2007 2009 →

The 2008 British Formula Ford Championship was the 33rd edition of the British Formula Ford Championship. It began on 24 March at Oulton Park's Easter Monday meeting and ended on 12 October at Donington Park after 10 rounds and 25 races, held in the United Kingdom and Belgium. Having won 13 of the first 18 races, Jamun Mygale driver Wayne Boyd looked set to be a runaway championship winner, although in the end, Boyd's championship winning margin over teammate Tim Blanchard was 50 points.

== Drivers and teams ==
Team	No	Driver	Class	Chassis	Rounds
(United Kingdom) Jamun Racing	2	(United Kingdom) James Cole	C	Mygale	All
(United Kingdom) Jamun Racing	3	(Australia) Tim Blanchard	C	Mygale	All
(United Kingdom) Jamun Racing	4	(United Kingdom) Wayne Boyd	C	Mygale	All
(United Kingdom) Jamun Racing	5	(Brazil) Victor Corrêa	C	Mygale	All
(United Kingdom) Fluid Motorsport	6	(Denmark) Marco Sørensen	C	Van Diemen	1-9
(United Kingdom) Fluid Motorsport	7	(United Kingdom) David Brown	C	Van Diemen	All
(United Kingdom) Fluid Motorsport	716	(Denmark) Claus Frøkjær-Lorendsen	G	Van Diemen	7
(United Kingdom) Fluid Motorsport	760	(Denmark) Dennis Lind	G	Van Diemen	7
(United Kingdom) Kevin Mills Racing	11	(United Kingdom) Adrian Campfield	C	Spectrum	All
(United Kingdom) Kevin Mills Racing	12	(Australia) Glen Wood	C	Spectrum	1-9
(United Kingdom) Kevin Mills Racing	16	(United Kingdom) Alex Jones	S	Spectrum	5-7
(United Kingdom) Kevin Mills Racing	27	(United Kingdom) Alex Jones	S	Spectrum	8-10
(United Kingdom) Myerscough College	16	(United Kingdom) Alex Jones	S	Van Diemen	1-4
(United Kingdom) Ray Sport	14	(United Kingdom) Adam Batch	S	Ray	1, 3
(United Kingdom) Joe Tandy Racing	15	(France) Philippe Layac	C	Mygale	1-8
(United Kingdom) Joe Tandy Racing	24	(Netherlands) Rogier de Wit	C	Mygale	All
(United Kingdom) Joe Tandy Racing	63	(Republic of Ireland) Peter Dempsey	G	Mygale	8
(United Kingdom) Joe Tandy Racing	69	(United Kingdom) Nick Tandy	G	Mygale	7
(United Kingdom) Joe Tandy Racing	98	(United Kingdom) Matt Hamilton	C	Mygale	All
(United Kingdom) Red Devil Team Comtec	17	(United Kingdom) Westley Barber	C	Comtec	1-4
(United Kingdom) Red Devil Team Comtec	18	(Brazil) Francisco Weiler	C	Comtec	1-5
(United Kingdom) 4D Motorsport	20	(United Kingdom) Matt Dobson	C	Van Diemen	6, 8-9
(United Kingdom) Inter Motorsport	20	(United Kingdom) Matt Dobson	C	Van Diemen	1-5
(United Kingdom) Inter Motorsport	73	(United Kingdom) Callum Holland	S	Van Diemen	2-4, 8-10
(United Kingdom) Daglish Racing	22	(United Kingdom) Peter Daglish	S	Ray	2-6, 8-10
(United Kingdom) Getem Racing	23	(Netherlands) Chris Maliepaard	C	Mygale	All
(United Kingdom) Getem Racing	58	(United Kingdom) Linton Stuteley	C	Mygale	All
(United Kingdom) Garry Findlay Racing	33	(United Kingdom) Garry Findlay	S	Mygale	All
(United Kingdom) Wrensport	44	(United Kingdom) Felix Scott	S	Spirit	All
(United Kingdom) ACER Motorsport	46	(United Kingdom) Jamie Jardine	C	Comtec	1-2, 4-6, 8
(United Kingdom) Slidesports	55	(United Kingdom) Daniel Walker	S	Mygale	1, 3-6, 8-10
(Netherlands) Vuik Racing	60	(Netherlands) Henk Vuik, Jr.	G	Mygale	5
(Netherlands) Vuik Racing	711	(Netherlands) Henk Vuik, Jr.	G	Mygale	7
(Netherlands) Vuik Racing	61	(Netherlands) Rogier Jongejans	G	Mygale	5
(Netherlands) Vuik Racing	718	(Netherlands) Rogier Jongejans	G	Mygale	7
(Netherlands) Vuik Racing	62	(Netherlands) Liroy Stuart	G	Mygale	5
(Netherlands) Stuart Racing	73	(Netherlands) Liroy Stuart	G	Mygale	7
(Netherlands) Stuart Racing	713	(Netherlands) Jeroen Mul	G	Mygale	7
(United Kingdom) Speedsports	64	(United Kingdom) Robert Souster	G	Van Diemen	9-10
(United Kingdom) Team Autocar	65	(United Kingdom) Matt Prior	G	Van Diemen	9-10
(Netherlands) Michel Florie Racing	72	(Netherlands) Michel Florie	G	Mygale	7
(Belgium) John's Racing Team	75	(Belgium) John Svensson	G	Van Diemen	7
(Netherlands) Geva Racing	77	(Netherlands) Jennifer van der Beek	G	Mygale	7
(Netherlands) Geva Racing	727	(Netherlands) Arthur van Uitert	G	Mygale	7
(Netherlands) KTG Racing	78	(Netherlands) Simon Knap	G	Mygale	7
(United Kingdom) Sterling Motorsport	99	(United Kingdom) Chrissy Palmer	S	Ray	1, 3-10
(Denmark) Racing Team Vestergaard	714	(Denmark) Nils Vestergaard	G	Mygale	7

Icon	Class
C	Championship
S	Scholarship
G	Guest

== Race calendar and results ==
Round		Circuit	Date	Pole position	Fastest lap	Winning driver	Winning team
1	R1	(United Kingdom) Oulton Park	24 March	(United Kingdom) Wayne Boyd	(United Kingdom) Wayne Boyd	(United Kingdom) Wayne Boyd	(United Kingdom) Jamun Racing
1	R2	(United Kingdom) Oulton Park	24 March	(United Kingdom) Wayne Boyd	(United Kingdom) Wayne Boyd	(United Kingdom) Wayne Boyd	(United Kingdom) Jamun Racing
1	R3	(United Kingdom) Oulton Park	24 March	(United Kingdom) Wayne Boyd	(United Kingdom) Wayne Boyd	(Australia) Tim Blanchard	(United Kingdom) Jamun Racing
2	R1	(United Kingdom) Knockhill Racing Circuit	12 April	(United Kingdom) Wayne Boyd	(Australia) Tim Blanchard	(United Kingdom) Wayne Boyd	(United Kingdom) Jamun Racing
2	R2	(United Kingdom) Knockhill Racing Circuit	13 April	(United Kingdom) Wayne Boyd	(United Kingdom) Wayne Boyd	(United Kingdom) Wayne Boyd	(United Kingdom) Jamun Racing
2	R3	(United Kingdom) Knockhill Racing Circuit	13 April	(United Kingdom) Wayne Boyd	(United Kingdom) Wayne Boyd	(United Kingdom) Wayne Boyd	(United Kingdom) Jamun Racing
3	R1	(United Kingdom) Croft Circuit	26 April	(United Kingdom) Wayne Boyd	(United Kingdom) Wayne Boyd	(United Kingdom) Wayne Boyd	(United Kingdom) Jamun Racing
3	R2	(United Kingdom) Croft Circuit	27 April	(United Kingdom) Wayne Boyd	(United Kingdom) Wayne Boyd	(United Kingdom) Wayne Boyd	(United Kingdom) Jamun Racing
3	R3	(United Kingdom) Croft Circuit	27 April	(Australia) Glen Wood	(Brazil) Victor Corrêa	(Netherlands) Chris Maliepaard	(United Kingdom) Getem Racing
4	R1	(United Kingdom) Brands Hatch	3 May	(United Kingdom) Westley Barber	(United Kingdom) Wayne Boyd	(United Kingdom) Wayne Boyd	(United Kingdom) Jamun Racing
4	R2	(United Kingdom) Brands Hatch	4 May	(United Kingdom) Wayne Boyd	(United Kingdom) Wayne Boyd	(United Kingdom) Wayne Boyd	(United Kingdom) Jamun Racing
5	R1	(United Kingdom) Rockingham Motor Speedway	25 May	(Australia) Tim Blanchard	(United Kingdom) Wayne Boyd	(Australia) Tim Blanchard	(United Kingdom) Jamun Racing
5	R2	(United Kingdom) Rockingham Motor Speedway	26 May	(Australia) Tim Blanchard	(Australia) Tim Blanchard	(Netherlands) Chris Maliepaard	(United Kingdom) Getem Racing
5	R3	(United Kingdom) Rockingham Motor Speedway	26 May	(Australia) Tim Blanchard	(United Kingdom) Wayne Boyd	(United Kingdom) Wayne Boyd	(United Kingdom) Jamun Racing
6	R1	(United Kingdom) Snetterton Motor Racing Circuit	8 June	(United Kingdom) Matt Hamilton	(United Kingdom) Wayne Boyd	(United Kingdom) Wayne Boyd	(United Kingdom) Jamun Racing
6	R2	(United Kingdom) Snetterton Motor Racing Circuit	8 June	(United Kingdom) Matt Hamilton	(United Kingdom) Wayne Boyd	(Netherlands) Chris Maliepaard	(United Kingdom) Getem Racing
7	R1	(Belgium) Circuit de Spa-Francorchamps	20 June	(Brazil) Victor Corrêa	(United Kingdom) Nick Tandy	(United Kingdom) Wayne Boyd	(United Kingdom) Jamun Racing
7	R2	(Belgium) Circuit de Spa-Francorchamps	21 June	(United Kingdom) Wayne Boyd	(Australia) Tim Blanchard	(United Kingdom) Wayne Boyd	(United Kingdom) Jamun Racing
8	R1	(United Kingdom) Brands Hatch	13 July	(United Kingdom) Wayne Boyd	(Denmark) Marco Sørensen	(United Kingdom) Adrian Campfield	(United Kingdom) Kevin Mills Racing
8	R2	(United Kingdom) Brands Hatch	13 July	(United Kingdom) Wayne Boyd	(United Kingdom) Matt Hamilton	(Brazil) Victor Corrêa	(United Kingdom) Jamun Racing
9	R1	(United Kingdom) Silverstone Circuit	17 August	(Australia) Tim Blanchard	(Denmark) Marco Sørensen	(Australia) Tim Blanchard	(United Kingdom) Jamun Racing
9	R2	(United Kingdom) Silverstone Circuit	17 August	(Australia) Tim Blanchard	(Denmark) Marco Sørensen	(Denmark) Marco Sørensen	(United Kingdom) Fluid Motorsport
10	R1	(United Kingdom) Donington Park	11 October	(United Kingdom) Wayne Boyd	(Brazil) Victor Corrêa	(Brazil) Victor Corrêa	(United Kingdom) Jamun Racing
10	R2	(United Kingdom) Donington Park	12 October	(United Kingdom) Wayne Boyd	(Netherlands) Chris Maliepaard	(United Kingdom) David Brown	(United Kingdom) Fluid Motorsport
10	R3	(United Kingdom) Donington Park	12 October	(Netherlands) Chris Maliepaard	(United Kingdom) Wayne Boyd	(United Kingdom) David Brown	(United Kingdom) Fluid Motorsport

== Championship standings ==
Points are awarded to the drivers as follows:

Position	1	2	3	4	5	6	7	8	9	10	11	12	13	14	15	PP/FL
Points	30	27	25	22	20	18	16	14	12	10	8	6	4	2	1	1

Best 23 scores must be dropped towards the championship.

- T. Pts — points if all races counted.
- Drop — two dropped scores.
- Pts — best 23 scores.
- S. Pts — Scholarship championship points, best 23 scores.

Pos	Driver	OUL (United Kingdom)			KNO (United Kingdom)			CRO (United Kingdom)			BRH (United Kingdom)		ROC (United Kingdom)			SNE (United Kingdom)		SPA (Belgium)		BRH (United Kingdom)		SIL (United Kingdom)		DON (United Kingdom)			T. Pts	Drop	Pts	S. Pts
1	(United Kingdom) Wayne Boyd	1	1	9	1	1	1	1	1	DSQ	1	1	2	6	1	1	2	1	1	10	2	7	3	3	2	2	659	25	634	
2	(Australia) Tim Blanchard	2	2	1	5	3	2	2	2	Ret	4	4	1	3	2	5	3	2	4	2	7	1	2	Ret	3	6	584		584	
3	(Netherlands) Chris Maliepaard	7	7	10	Ret	DSQ	9	5	10	1	6	6	3	1	5	3	1	3	5	4	5	3	10	4	4	4	473	10	463	
4	(Brazil) Victor Corrêa	Ret	4	7	7	5	3	6	8	2	14	9	10	2	3	4	15	8	3	12	1	2	11	1	10	Ret	414		414	
5	(United Kingdom) Linton Stuteley	9	6	6	2	2	5	4	7	4	3	14	Ret	12	9	9	5	7	9	6	10	6	6	8	5	5	411	2	409	
6	(United Kingdom) Matt Hamilton	4	5	Ret	15	7	7	3	3	9†	DNS	5	5	5	11	2	6	6	7	15	8	Ret	5	7	6	7	371		371	
7	(United Kingdom) David Brown	6	8	3	6	6	4	16	14	Ret	8	7	6	Ret	Ret	7	11	Ret	Ret	5	6	11	8	2	1	1	336		336	
8	(Denmark) Marco Sørensen	3	3	2	4	10	Ret	11	16	Ret	5	8	Ret	Ret	12	8	7	5	8	3	4	4	1				327		327	
9	(United Kingdom) Adrian Campfield	Ret	10	4	8	9	6	12	6	13	7	3	11	Ret	14	6	4	22	Ret	1	3	10	7	Ret	7	3	325		325	
10	(United Kingdom) James Cole	Ret	DNS	8	9	8	10	7	Ret	Ret†	10	15	8	9	7	14	10	4	6	9	12	5	4	9	9	8	267		267	
11	(Netherlands) Rogier de Wit	Ret	12	Ret	11	13	Ret	14	9	6	12	10	4	4	4	16	9	9	19	8	11	8	9	6	14	Ret	230		230	
12	(United Kingdom) Westley Barber	5	Ret	5	3	4	8	5	DSQ	Ret	2	2															176		176	
13	(France) Philippe Layac	11	11	12	10	12	Ret	13	13	5	9	9	12	7	8	11	13	14	13	14	14						162		162	
14	(United Kingdom) Garry Findlay (S)	10	Ret	11	DNS	DNS	DNS	10	11	8	11	11	7	19	Ret	10	8	DNS	14	DNS	DNS	9	12	11	15	9	155		155	500
15	(United Kingdom) Chrissy Palmer (S)	Ret	DNS	DNS				15	4	7	13	16	9	11	6	12	12	16	15	17	15	14	14	5	12	DNS	143		143	513
16	(Australia) Glen Wood	8	9	Ret	Ret	11	8	9	12	3	DSQ†	13	Ret	Ret	Ret	Ret	Ret	Ret	Ret	7	13	12	Ret				112		112	
17	(United Kingdom) Alex Jones (S)	15	13	Ret	12	Ret	11	Ret	Ret	DNS	15	18	Ret	8	Ret	18	Ret	DNS	16	13†	17	13	13	10	8	Ret	72		72	422
18	(United Kingdom) Felix Scott (S)	DNS	DNS	DNS	Ret	Ret	14	17	15	10	18	19	NC	18	17	17	Ret	21	22	19	19	17	15	Ret	16	13	30		30	406
19	(United Kingdom) Callum Holland (S)				Ret	17	12	Ret	17	Ret	DNS	20								Ret	Ret	18	21	12	11	11	30		30	211
20	(United Kingdom) Matt Dobson	13	15	14	14	16	13	18	18	11	16	17	19	16	18	15	14			18	18	15	16				29		29	
21	(United Kingdom) Jamie Jardine	12	Ret	15	Ret	14	Ret				17	Ret	16	14	16	13	16			16	16						24		24	
22	(Brazil) Francisco Weiler	Ret	DNS	17	13	15	15	19	20	14	Ret	DNS	14	17	15												16		16	
23	(United Kingdom) Peter Daglish (S)				16	18	16	Ret	21	15	19	21	13	Ret	19	19	Ret			20	20	19	18	14	Ret	12	15		15	349
24	(United Kingdom) Adam Batch (S)	14	14	13				20	22	12																	14		14	103
25	(United Kingdom) Daniel Walker (S)	16	16	16				Ret	19	16	20	Ret	17	Ret	20	20	17			21	21	21	19	Ret	DNS	Ret	0		0	289
guest drivers ineligible for championship points
	(United Kingdom) Nick Tandy																	Ret	2											
	(Republic of Ireland) Peter Dempsey																			11	9									
	(Netherlands) Liroy Stuart												Ret	10	DNS			10	11											
	(Netherlands) Simon Knap																	12	10											
	(United Kingdom) Robert Souster																					16	17	13	13	10				
	(Netherlands) Rogier Jongejans												18	15	10			13	Ret											
	(Netherlands) Henk Vuik, Jr.												15	13	13			11	17											
	(Belgium) John Svensson																	DNS	12											
	(Denmark) Dennis Lind																	15	21											
	(Netherlands) Michel Florie																	17	DNS											
	(Denmark) Nils Vestergaard																	18	18											
	(Netherlands) Jeroen Mul																	19	20											
	(United Kingdom) Matt Prior																					20	20							
	(Netherlands) Jennifer van der Beek																	20	Ret											
	(Denmark) Arthur van Uitert																	23	23											
	(Denmark) Claus Frøkjær-Lorendsen																	24	24											
Pos	Driver	OUL (United Kingdom)			KNO (United Kingdom)			CRO (United Kingdom)			BRH (United Kingdom)		ROC (United Kingdom)			SNE (United Kingdom)		SPA (Belgium)		BRH (United Kingdom)		SIL (United Kingdom)		DON (United Kingdom)			T. Pts	Drop	Pts	S. Pts

Colour	Result
Gold	Winner
Silver	Second place
Bronze	Third place
Green	Points classification
Blue	Non-points classification
Blue	Non-classified finish (NC)
Purple	Retired, not classified (Ret)
Red	Did not qualify (DNQ)
Red	Did not pre-qualify (DNPQ)
Black	Disqualified (DSQ)
White	Did not start (DNS)
White	Withdrew (WD)
White	Race cancelled (C)
Blank	Did not practice (DNP)
Blank	Did not arrive (DNA)
Blank	Excluded (EX)

† - Matt Hamilton, James Cole and Alex Jones docked six points for dangerous driving; Glen Wood docked twelve points for the same reason.
