= John Lewis (antiquarian, born 1675) =

English clergyman and antiquary

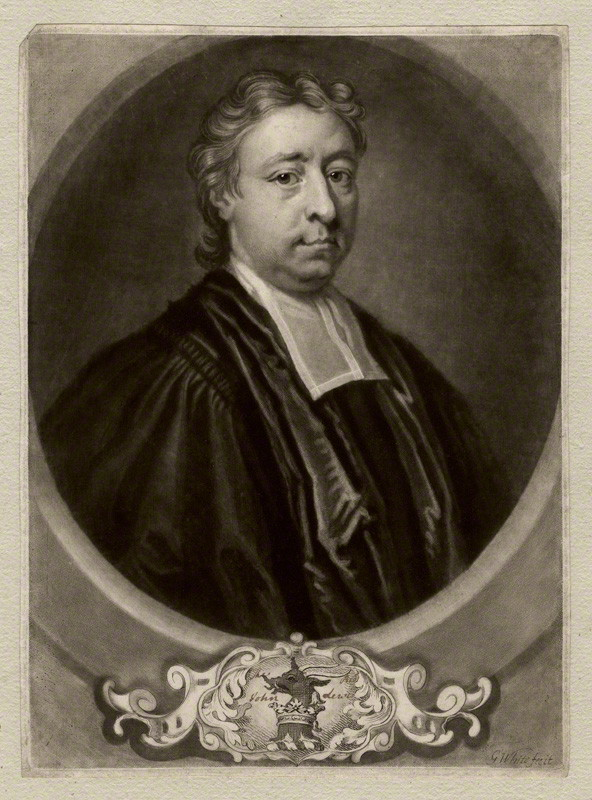
John Lewis

John Lewis (29 August 1675 – 16 January 1747) was an English clergyman and antiquary.

== Life ==
Born in the parish of St. Nicholas, Bristol, on 29 August 1675, he was the eldest son of John Lewis, wine cooper in the city. Francis Lewis, vicar of Worth Matravers, Dorset, was his paternal grandfather. His mother was Mary, eldest daughter of John Eyre, merchant, of Poole. He received his education first under Samuel Conant, rector of Lichet-Matravers, next at Wimborne grammar school, under John Moyle and afterwards under John Russel in the grammar school at Poole. He acted as assistant to Russel, who, after he had moved to Wapping, obtained for Lewis admission to the free school of Ratcliff Cross, belonging to the Coopers' Company.

On leaving school Lewis became tutor to the sons of Daniel Wigfall, a Turkey and lead merchant, and afterwards, 30 March 1694, was admitted a bachelor of Exeter College, Oxford, under the tuition of George Verman, a friend of Conant. While at the university he became assistant in the free school of Poole in 1696. After graduating B.A. on 14 October 1697 he returned to Russel at Wapping, and shortly afterwards was ordained deacon.

In April 1698 he became curate of Acrise, Kent, and was collated to the rectory of the parish on 4 September 1699. In 1702, Archbishop Thomas Tenison having ordered the sequestration of the rectory of Hawkinge, near Dover, licensed Lewis to serve the cure, and in 1705 presented him to the vicarage of St. John the Baptist, Margate. The archbishop collated him to the rectory of Saltwood, with the chapel of Hythe, and to the desolate rectory of Eastbridge in 1706, and subsequently removed him to the vicarage of Minster, to which he was instituted on 10 March 1709.

Lewis was appointed to preach at the archiepiscopal visitation on 28 May 1712, when his Whiggish and Low Church views excited open hostility from his hearers. He commenced M.A. in 1712 as a member of Corpus Christi College, Cambridge. In 1714 he offended a former friend, John Johnson of Cranbrook, by attacking, in his 'Bread and Wine in the Holy Eucharist not a proper Material Propitiatory Sacrifice,' Johnson's 'Unbloody Sacrifice & Altar Unvailed,' which presented the high-church position. Archbishop Tenison, Daniel Waterland, and Samuel Bradford approved of Lewis's reply, and when he re-enunciated his views in Canterbury Cathedral on 30 January 1717, Archbishop William Wake rewarded him with the mastership of Eastbridge Hospital, Canterbury. From this time until his death he engaged on works on biography and topography.

Dying on 16 January 1747, he was buried in the chancel of his church at Minster. He composed more than a thousand sermons, but he ordered his executor to destroy them, 'lest they might contribute to the laziness of others.'

He married Mary, the youngest daughter of Robert Knowler of Herne, Kent. She died in 1720, leaving no issue.

== Works ==
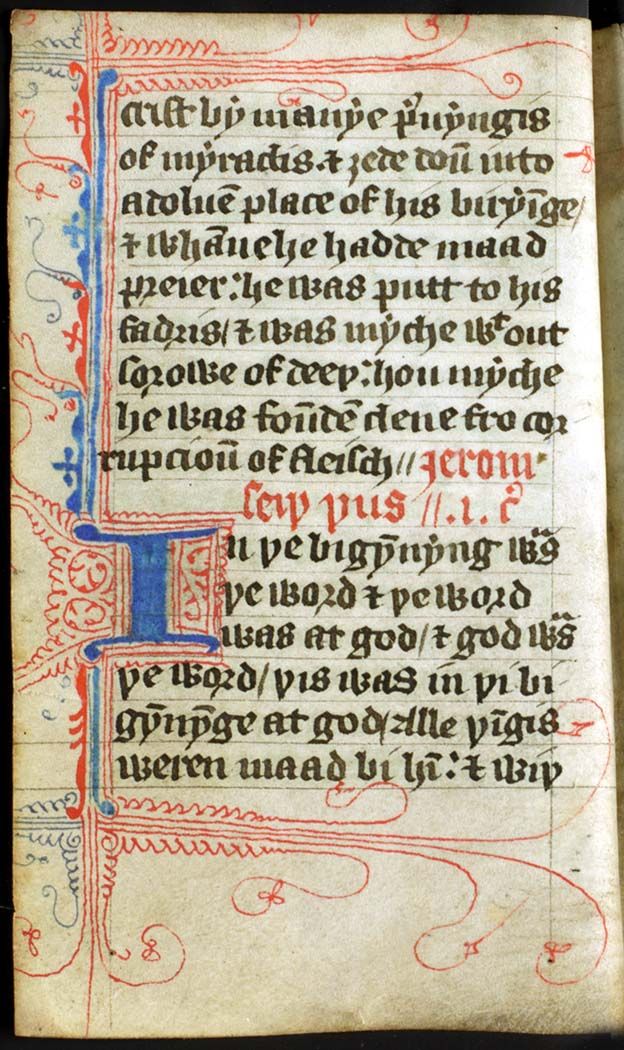
Gospel of St. John, Wyclif translation from the 14th century, a copy owned by Lewis.

=== Religious biography ===
Lewis is mainly known as a biographer of John Wyclif, William Caxton, Reginald Pecock, and Bishop John Fisher, leaving heavy works of research written with a Protestant slant:

- The History of the Life and Sufferings of … John Wicliffe. … With a Collection of Papers relating to the said History, never before printed, Lond. 1720 and 1723; new edit., corrected and enlarged by the author, Oxford, 1820.
- The Life of Mayster Wyllyam Caxton, of the Weald of Kent, the first Printer in England. In which is given an Account of the Rise and Progress of the Art of Prynting in England during his time, till 1493, was first published, Lond. 1737. In this work he was assisted by Sir Peter Thompson and Joseph Ames. Most of it was inserted by Thomas Frognall Dibdin in his edition of Ames's Typographical Antiquities. It was superseded by William Blades's Biography of Caxton. Collections for a history of printing by Lewis, dated 1741, are in British Library Add MS 20035.
- The Life of Reynold Pecocke, Bishop of St. Asaph and Chichester; … being a sequel of the Life of Dr. J. Wiclif, to an introduction to the history of the English Reformation, appeared in 1744; new edit. Oxford, 1820.
- The Life of Dr. John Fisher, Bishop of Rochester. With an Appendix of illustrative Documents and Papers, was first printed in 2 vols. in 1855. With an introduction by Thomas Hudson Turner.

Lewis also edited Roper's Life of More, 1729, and he left in manuscript lives of Servetus (written in answer to Sir Benjamin Hodges's biography, Lond. 1724, and formerly in Sir Peter Thompson's possession); of John Wallis, 1735; of George Hickes, 1744–5; and of John Johnson of Cranbrook. Part of an autobiography by Lewis, which he continued till near his death, is extant in a copy transcribed for Sir Peter Thompson (British Library Add MS 28651).

=== Bible history ===
Lewis also made contributions to religious history and bibliography. Pursuing his study of Wiclif he published in 1731 The New Testament, translated out of the Latin Vulgat by John Wiclif, S.T.P., about 1378: to which is præfixt a History of the Translations of the Bible and New Testament, &c. into English, London. The History of Translations was the first history of the English Bible since Miles Smith wrote in 1611; it was issued separately with additions as A Complete History of the several Translations of the Holy Bible and New Testament into English, both in MS. and in print, 2nd edit., with additions, Lond. 1739; 3rd edit., with an appendix drawn from William Newcome's Historical View of English Biblical Translations, Lond. 1818.

In 1738 appeared A brief History of the Rise and Progress of Anabaptism in England; to which is prefixed some account of Dr. John Wicliffe, with a Defence of him from the false Charge of his denying Infant Baptism, London. A Reply to the work, by Thomas Crosby, is dated 1738. Lewis pursued the subject in A Vindication of the Ancient Britons and the Pighards of Bohemia from the false accusation of being Anabaptists, London 1741. Richard Chilton published Some Observations on this work, 1743.

=== Topography ===
Lewis's topographical works deal mainly with Kent. They include:

- The History and Antiquities, Ecclesiastical and Civil, of the Isle of Tenet in Kent, London 1723; 2nd edit., with additions, 2 pts. Lond. 1736.
- The History and Antiquities of the Abbey and Church of Favresham, in Kent, of the adjoining Priory of Davington, and Maison-Dieu of Ospringe, and Parish of Bocton subtus le Bleyne, 2 pts. [London] 1727.
- A little Dissertation on the Antiquities of the two ancient Ports of Richborough and Sandwich, by the Isle of Tenet in Kent. Printed verbatim from the original MS., London 1851, being No. 13 of a "Series of Tracts on British Topography" (sixty copies printed).

Richard Gough ascribed to Lewis The History and Antiquities of the cathedral church of Rochester, London 1717; but it was by Richard Rawlinson.

=== Tracts ===
Lewis wrote many tracts on theological and antiquarian topics. The major ones are:

- The Church Catechism explain'd by way of question and answer, and confirm'd by Scripture proofs, London 1700, frequently reprinted. It was translated into Irish and Welsh.
- An Apology for the Clergy of the Church of England, in a particular examination of a book [by Matthew Tindal] entituled "The Rights of the Christian Church," and its second Defence, Lond. 1711.
- The Agreement of the Lutheran Churches with the Church of England, shewn from the publick Confessions of the several Churches, London 1715.
- Two letters in defence of the English Liturgy and Reformation, a reply to Thomas Bisse, 2nd edit., with additions, 2 pts. London 1717.
- Historical Essay upon the Consecration of Churches, London 1719.
- A Specimen of the Errors in the second volume of Collier's "Ecclesiastical History," being a Vindication of Bishop Burnet's "History of the Reformation", 1724.
- A Dissertation on the Antiquity and Use of Seals in England, London 1736.
- A brief Discovery of the Arts of the Popish Protestant Missioners in England, to pave the way for the restitution … of Popery, London 1750.
- An Essay towards an account of Bishops suffragan in England, printed in John Nichols's Bibliotheca Topographica Britannica, 1790, vol. vi.
- Of the Books used in Churches and Monasteries here in England before the Reformation, printed in John Gutch's Collectanea Curiosa, ii. 165 (from Rawl. MS. in the Bodleian, C. 412).

Many of Lewis's tracts remained unprinted. Among the Rawlinson's Manuscripts are: Popish Cruelty exemplified in the persecution of the English Lollards from 1382 to 1507; and three tracts on the Eucharist. A catalogue of Lewis's manuscripts sold by Abraham Langford of Covent Garden, December 1749, is copied with the prices in Add MS 28651, f. 46.
