= Sten Pentus =

Estonian racing driver (born 1981)

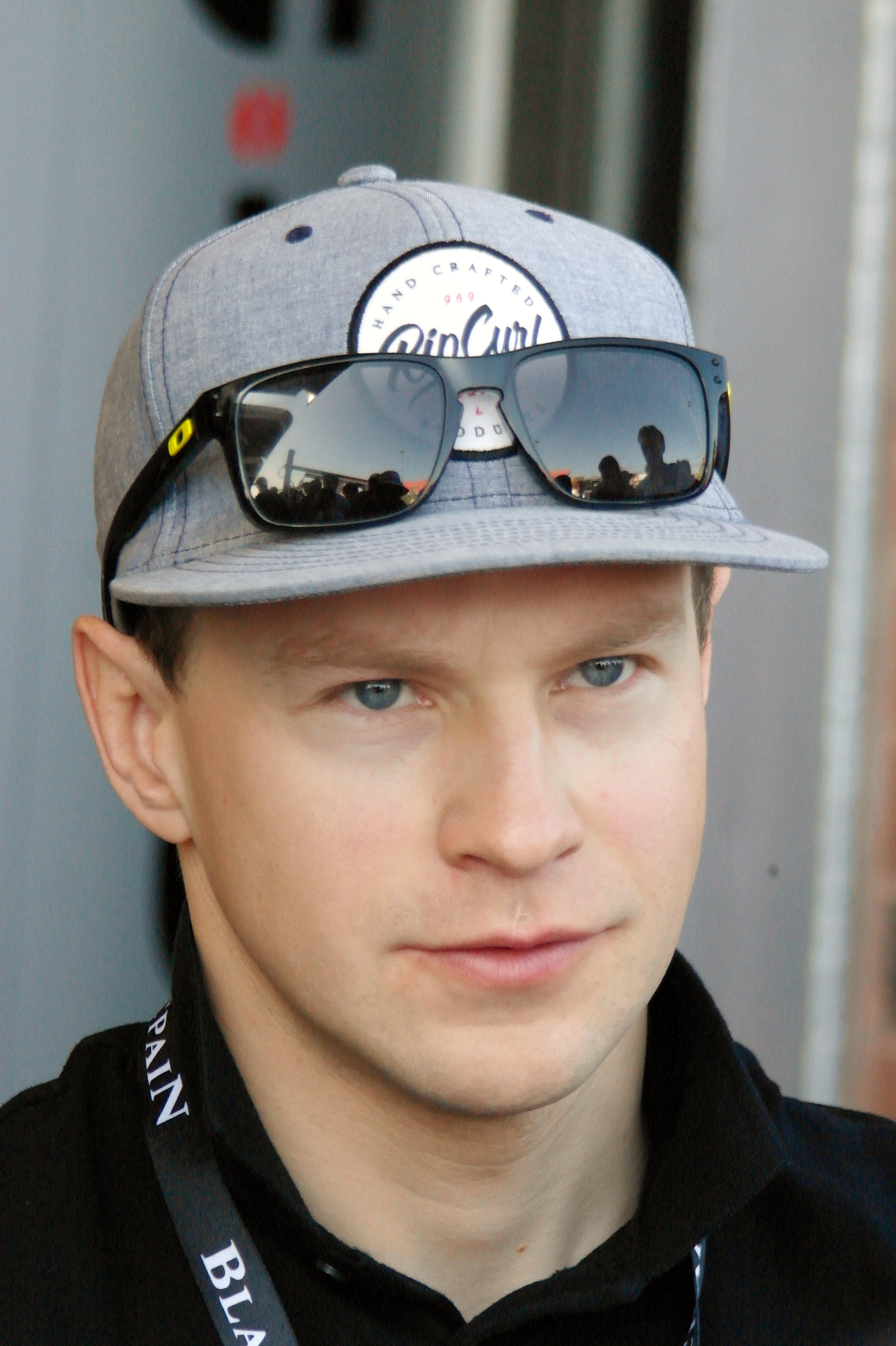
- Sten Pentus at the Brands Hatch round of the 2014 Blancpain Sprint Series season.
- Nationality: Estonian
- Born: 3 November 1981 (age 45) Tallinn, then part of Estonian SSR, Soviet Union

Blancpain Sprint series career
- Debut season: 2014
- Current team: Bhaitech
- Categorisation: FIA Gold (until 2019); FIA Silver (2020–)
- Car number: 61
- Starts: 12
- Wins: 0
- Poles: 0
- Fastest laps: 0
- Best finish: 25th in 2014

Previous series
- 2012 2008–2011 2010 2008 2007 2007 2006 2006 2004 2002 2000–01 2000: Auto GP World Series; Formula Renault 3.5 Series; Toyota Racing Series; Formula Renault UK; Formula Renault BARC; FRenault BARC W. Series; Eurocup Formula Renault 2.0; Formula Renault 2.0 NEC; Formula BMW ADAC; Finnish Touring Cars; Formula 4 Estonia; Formula Baltic

Championship titles
- 2000–01 2000: Formula 4 Estonia; Formula Baltic

Sten Pentus (born 3 November 1981 in Tallinn) is an Estonian racing driver.

Pentus is a former Estonian Formula 4 Champion, and a previous winner of the Formula Baltic championship in a Reynard 903.

At the end of the 2008 season, Pentus tested for GP2 Series teams DPR and Racing Engineering with respectable results considering his previous racing experience. In November, he tested with Fortec Motorsport in the Formula Renault 3.5 Series test in Valencia and again impressed, comparing favourably with F3 graduates Edoardo Mortara and Jaime Alguersuari during the two days. Fortec would later sign Pentus for the 2009 season on January 30, 2009. He scored his first points in the series when he finished second in the feature race at the Circuit de Catalunya, having started nineteenth. This earned Pentus a bonus point for the most places gained in the race. He achieved that again in the feature race at Spa, qualifying 19th and finishing 11th. He went on to finish sixteenth in the overall standings and finished sixth in the rookie championship overall standings.

Pentus stayed with Fortec to compete in the 2010 Formula Renault 3.5 Series. Pentus took his first win in the series, winning the second race at the season-opening round of the season at Ciudad del Motor de Aragón and second win in Hungaroring. He finished the 2010 season in fourth place overall. Pentus joined EPIC Racing team for the 2011 season, and eventually finished the disappointing season 24th.

In 2014, Pentus switched from single-seaters to GT racing, competing in the Blancpain Sprint series with the Bhaitech team in a McLaren MP4-12C GT3.

== Racing record ==
=== Racing career summary ===
Season	Series	Team	Races	Wins	Poles	F/Laps	Podiums	Points	Position
2000	Baltic Formula 4	???	?	?	?	?	?	280	1st
2000	Formula Baltic	???	?	?	?	?	?	?	1st
2001	Baltic Formula 4	???	?	?	?	?	?	?	1st
2001	Baltic Touring Car Championship - Super 1600	???	5	1	?	?	4	94	2nd
2002	Formula Baltic	???	?	?	?	?	?	125	2nd
2002	Baltic Touring Car Championship - B2000	Saksa Auto AMK	6	0	0	0	2	44	7th
2002	Sport 2000 Tour	Saksa Auto AMK	4	0	0	0	0	0	?
2003	Formula Baltic	???	?	?	?	?	?	78	4th
2004	Formula BMW ADAC	KUG-DeWalt Racing	18	0	0	0	0	4	18th
2005	Formula Baltic	???	?	?	?	?	?	60	10th
2006	Eurocup Formula Renault 2.0	SG Formula	6	0	0	0	0	0	30th
2006	Formula Renault 2.0 NEC	MDR Motorsport	2	0	0	0	0	18	30th
2007	Formula Renault BARC Winter Cup	Falcon Motorsport	4	1	2	1	1	25	4th
2007	Formula Renault BARC	Falcon Motorsport	8	0	0	0	1	27	11th
2008	Formula Renault 3.5 Series	Red Devil Comtec Racing	2	0	0	0	0	0	31st
2008	Formula Renault UK	CR Scuderia Formula Renault	10	0	0	0	0	78	18th
2009	Formula Renault 3.5 Series	Mofaz Racing	17	0	0	0	1	23	16th
2010	Toyota Racing Series	Giles Motorsport	12	2	0	2	7	660	4th
2010	Formula Renault 3.5 Series	Fortec Motorsport	17	2	1	2	4	78	4th
2011	Formula Renault 3.5 Series	EPIC Racing	17	0	0	0	0	11	24th
2012	Auto GP World Series	Virtuosi UK	2	0	0	0	0	14	15th
2012	Auto GP World Series	Zele Racing	4	0	0	0	0	14	15th
2014	Blancpain GT Series Sprint Cup - Overall	Bhaitech	14	0	0	0	0	4	24th
2016	Finnish Xtreme BMW Cup	EST 1 Racing 2	17	4	?	?	5	197	4th
2017	Touring Car Endurance Series - SP3-GT4	EST 1 Racing	1	0	0	0	1	26	?
2018	Alpine Elf Europa Cup	Milan Competition	1	0	0	0	0	0	NCA

=== Complete Formula Renault 2.0 NEC results ===
(key) (Races in bold indicate pole position) (Races in italics indicate fastest lap)

Year	Entrant	1	2	3	4	5	6	7	8	9	10	11	12	13	14	15	16	DC	Points
2006	MDR Motorsport	OSC; 1	OSC; 2	SPA; 1	SPA; 2	NÜR; 1	NÜR; 2	ZAN; 1	ZAN; 2	OSC; 1; 13	OSC; 2; 11	ASS; 1	ASS; 2	AND; 1	AND; 2	SAL; 1	SAL; 2	30th	18

=== Complete Eurocup Formula Renault 2.0 results ===
(key) (Races in bold indicate pole position; races in italics indicate fastest lap)

Year	Entrant	1	2	3	4	5	6	7	8	9	10	11	12	13	14	DC	Points
2006	SG Formula	ZOL; 1; 27	ZOL; 2; 11	IST; 1; 25	IST; 2; 22	MIS; 1; 20	MIS; 2; 28	NÜR; 1; 24	NÜR; 2; 23	DON; 1	DON; 2	LMS; 1	LMS; 2	CAT; 1	CAT; 2	30th	0

=== Complete Formula Renault 3.5 Series results ===
(key) (Races in bold indicate pole position) (Races in italics indicate fastest lap)

Year	Team	1	2	3	4	5	6	7	8	9	10	11	12	13	14	15	16	17	Pos	Points
2008	Red Devil Comtec Racing	MNZ; 1	MNZ; 2	SPA; 1	SPA; 2	MON; 1	SIL; 1	SIL; 2	HUN; 1	HUN; 2	NÜR; 1	NÜR; 2	BUG; 1	BUG; 2	EST; 1	EST; 2	CAT; 1; 14	CAT; 2; 17	31st	0
2009	Mofaz Racing	CAT; 1; 18	CAT; 2; 2	SPA; 1; 18	SPA; 2; 11	MON; 1; 11	HUN; 1; 18	HUN; 2; 15	SIL; 1; 14	SIL; 2; 7	BUG; 1; 14	BUG; 2; 13	ALG; 1; 9	ALG; 2; 14	NÜR; 1 Ret	NÜR; 2; 12	ALC; 1 Ret	ALC; 2; 10	16th	23
2010	Fortec Motorsport	ALC; 1 Ret	ALC; 2; 1	SPA; 1; 2	SPA; 2; 13	MON; 1; 6	BRN; 1; 6	BRN; 2 Ret	MAG; 1; 7	MAG; 2; 8	HUN; 1; 3	**HUN**; **2**; 1	HOC; 1 Ret	HOC; 2; 6	SIL; 1; 15	SIL; 2; 7	CAT; 1; 13	CAT; 2 Ret	4th	78
2011	EPIC Racing	ALC; 1; 10	ALC; 2; 11	SPA; 1 Ret	SPA; 2; 14	MNZ; 1; 16	MNZ; 2 Ret	MON; 1; 12	NÜR; 1; 19	NÜR; 2; 10	HUN; 1; 14	HUN; 2 Ret	SIL; 1; 6	SIL; 2; 10	LEC; 1; 22	LEC; 2 Ret	CAT; 1; 14	CAT; 2; 13	24th	11

=== Complete Auto GP World Series results ===
(key)

Year	Entrant	1	2	3	4	5	6	7	8	9	10	11	12	13	14	Pos	Points
2012	Virtuosi UK	MNZ; 1	MNZ; 2	VAL; 1; 10	VAL; 2; 10	MAR; 1	MAR; 2									15th	14
2012	Zele Racing							HUN; 1; 9	HUN; 2; 4	ALG; 1; 14†	ALG; 2 Ret	CUR; 1	CUR; 2	SON; 1	SON; 2	15th	14

== Personal ==
His sister Keit Pentus-Rosimannus is a politician.
