= Johnny Lewis (disambiguation) =

Johnny Lewis (1983–2012) was an American actor.

Johnny Lewis may also refer to:

- Johnny Lewis (baseball) (1939–2018), baseball player, coach, scout, and manager
- Johnny Lewis (boxing trainer) (born 1944), Australian boxing trainer
- Johnny Lewis (footballer) (1901–1973), Australian rules footballer
- Johnny Lewis (DJ) (born 1958), English disc jockey

== See also ==
- Johnnie Lewis (1946–2015), Liberian judge and politician
- John Lewis (disambiguation)
