= John Lewis (footballer, born 1954) =

English footballer

Personal information
- Full name: John George Lewis
- Date of birth: 9 May 1954 (age 72)
- Place of birth: Hackney, England
- Position: Midfielder

Youth career
- Tottenham Hotspur

Senior career*
Years	Team	Apps	(Gls)
1972–1974	Orient	2	(0)
1974–1975	Romford		
- Walthamstow Avenue
- Tilbury

International career
1972	England Youth	1	(0)
- * Club domestic league appearances and goals

For people with the same name see John Lewis (disambiguation)

John George Lewis (born 9 May 1954) is an English former professional footballer who played in the Football League as a midfielder. He also played non-league football for clubs including Romford, Walthamstow Avenue and Tilbury. He represented England at youth level.
