= John R. Lewis =

John R. Lewis may refer to:

- John Lewis (1940–2020), United States Congressman
- John Lewis (California politician) (born 1954), former California State Senator
- John Randolph Lewis (1834-1900), soldier and administrator

== See also ==
- John Lewis (disambiguation)
