= Comtec Racing =

UK motor racing team

(United Kingdom) Comtec Racing
- Founded: 2001
- Founder(s): Pierre Moncheur
- Base: Snetterton, Norfolk, England
- Team principal(s): Pierre Moncheur
- Current series: Formula Renault 3.5 Series
- Former series: Eurocup Formula Renault 2.0; Formula Renault 2.0 UK; Formula Ford; Auto GP
- Teams' Championships: 2002 Formula Ford UK
- Drivers' Championships: 2006 FR 3.5 (Danielsson); 2002 Formula Ford UK (Barber); 2003 Monoposto 2000 (J. Lewis); 2004 Monoposto 2000 (J. Lewis); 2006 750 MC Formula 4 (C. Lewis)
- Website: http://www.comtecracing.com/

Comtec Racing is a motor racing team based in the United Kingdom. It competes in three championships — Formula Renault, World Series by Renault and the Auto GP World Series.

== History ==
The team started out in Formula Ford from the ashes of the Van Diemen works team. Team Principal Piere Moncheur has guided the team since its formation.

The Formula Ford UK 2003 Championship was a 3-car assault, Tom Gaymor claimed 5th place, Oliver Jarvis finished 8th and Dan Clarke finished 12th.

For 2004 a 2-car assault on the Formula Renault UK Championship was launched with Westley Barber and Susie Stoddart (now Susie Wolf) as drivers. Westley finished runner up in the championship with Susie achieving 3 podiums and finishing 5th. Susie Wolf is now a test driver for the Williams F1 team.

The team then moved up to compete in the European and French Formula Renault Championships for 2005 with Westley Barber and Pippa Mann. Westley ran out of funds halfway through the year after a promising start which included a 2nd-place finish at the season opener and Pippa was very much on a learning curve with a best finish of 14th.

In 2006, Comtec moved up once more and competed in the World Series by Renault. In his maiden year Alx Danielsson won the championship. Halfway through the year a nightmare weekend at Spa proved the turning point for Alx Danielsson, he wrote his car off twice but after that five podiums which included four wins in 8 races gave Alx the crown in a great comeback. Pippa Mann continued to drive in the Formula Renault Eurocup with a best finish of 15th.

In 2007, the team used several drivers. Alejandro Núñez finished highest with 13th in the standings with one win.

In 2008, Marco Bonanomi and Pasquale Di Sabatino joined the team. Bonanomi won two pole positions but finished 11th. Di Sabatino was replaced for the final four races by Duncan Tappy.

Also in 2008 The team bought out the formula ford constructor Spirit and brought in the former UK champion Westley Barber alongside Brazilian rookie Francisco Weiler. Westley had a good start to the year and the car was good but the Mygale was better and in the hands of Wayne Boyd it dominated. Westley achieved two 2nd-place finishes at Brands Hatch, a 3rd and 4th place at Knockill and two other 5th-place finishes before the curtain was pulled down on the venture half the way through the season.

In 2009, still pursuing the Renault 3.5 world series Jon Lancaster led the team. He gained a pole position and one win after joining the championship halfway. The other seat changed between Anton Nebylitskiy, Harald Schlegelmilch, Alexandre Marsoin, John Martin, Max Chilton and Alberto Valerio.

In 2010 the team was led by Stefano Coletti and finished 5th. Greg Mansell was the team's other driver.

In 2011, Comtec signed rookies Daniel Mckenzie and Daniël de Jong. New Zealander Chris Van Der Drift tested the car to help the two Daniels in there quest to improve. but to little effect, just 2 points in the teams championship was all they could muster.

For 2012 Comtec Signed Nick Yelloly and Vittorio Ghirelli. Nick scored 2 wins for the team on his way to a creditable 5th-place finish overall in the championship. Vittorio endured a long learning curve but showed improvement with good drives ending with 5 points for the season.

2013 saw the team rebranded to SMP Racing by Comtec and the promotion of Phil Blow to team manager. Series veteran Daniil Move has signed for the season and will be partnered by Lucas Foresti.

The team a partnership with Virtuosi Racing with an entry into Auto GP for Venezuelan Roberto La Rocca with a view to entering 2 cars in 2014 alongside their assault on the World Series By Renault. At the first race in Auto GP Roberto La Rocca scored a creditable 8th-place finish which meant starting from pole for the 2nd race on a reverse grid. Roberto was running 5th before being pushed off, he went on to finish a creditable 7th. Better than the two drivers in the parent team Virtuosi Racing.

The team was based close to the Snetterton Motor Racing Circuit in Norfolk.

After 16 years of racing Comtec Racing closed its doors for the last time in 2017.

== Club Racing History ==
Comtec has had a successful period in single seater club racing. Former team owner Jonathan Lewis won the 2003 and 2004 Monoposto 2000 series and also the 2003 Formula 4 Championship. His brother Chris Lewis won the Formula 4 Championship in 2006.

John Roberts and Steve Patania also had race wins in Formula 4.

The team always competed against the drivers Adrian Kidd and Barry Pritchard of ABM Racing. In 2004, Adrian Kidd took the championship while Barry Pritchard won in 2005.

The team then ran Adrian Kidd's 16-year-old son Ben Kidd in the inaugural season of SAXMAX in 2006 after sadly Adrian died.

== Television appearances ==
In June 2007, the team's WSR car was featured in the BBC television programme Andrew Marr's History of Modern Britain; Marr driving the car to illustrate the political scandal in 1997 between Bernie Ecclestone and the newly elected Labour Party. The team has also appeared in the BBC motoring programme Top Gear, where presenter Richard Hammond drove a Comtec Formula Renault and then World Series by Renault car before moving up to a Renault Formula One car.

== Results ==
=== World Series by Renault ===
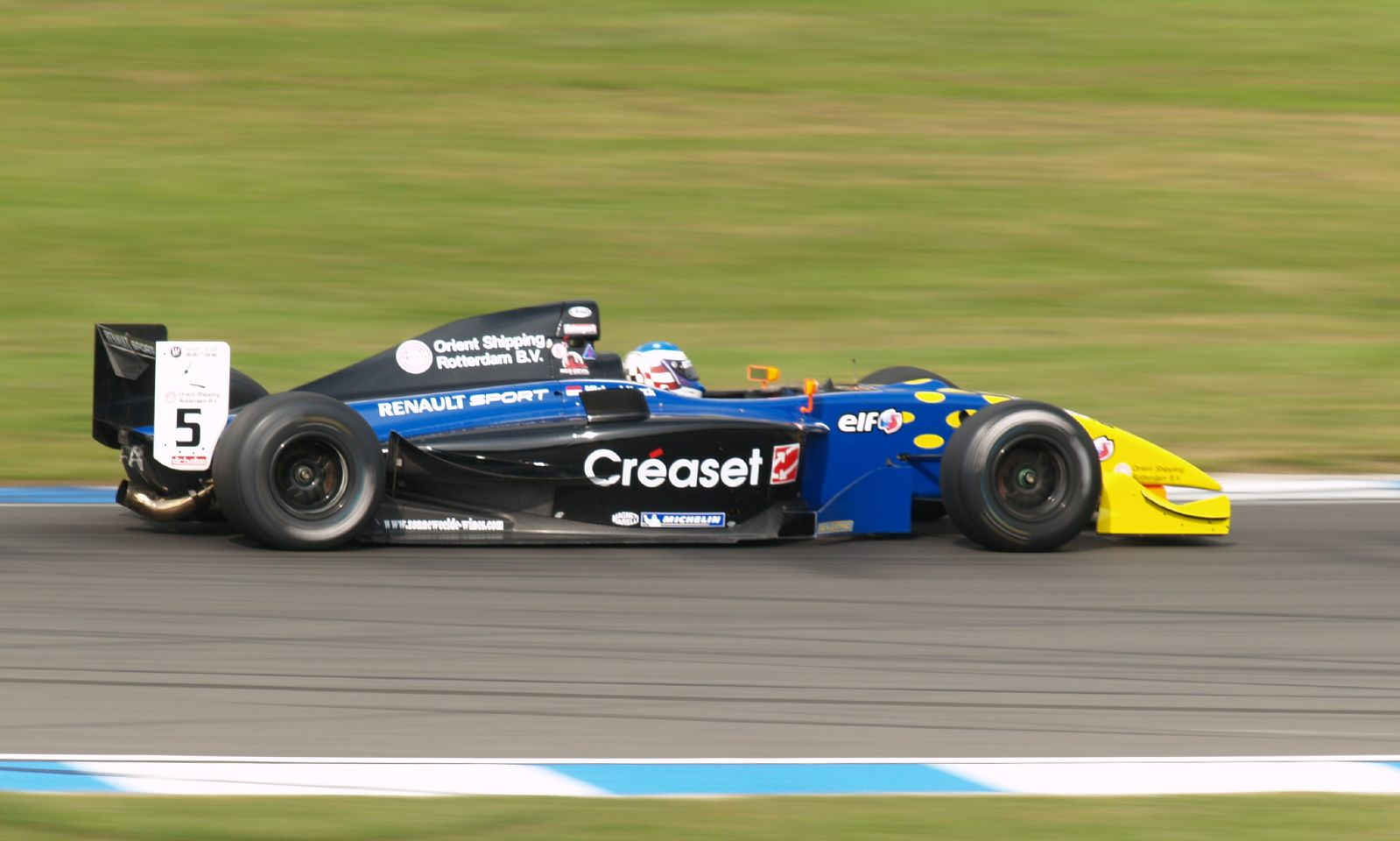
Michael Herck driving for Comtec at the Donington Park round of the 2007 World Series by Renault season.

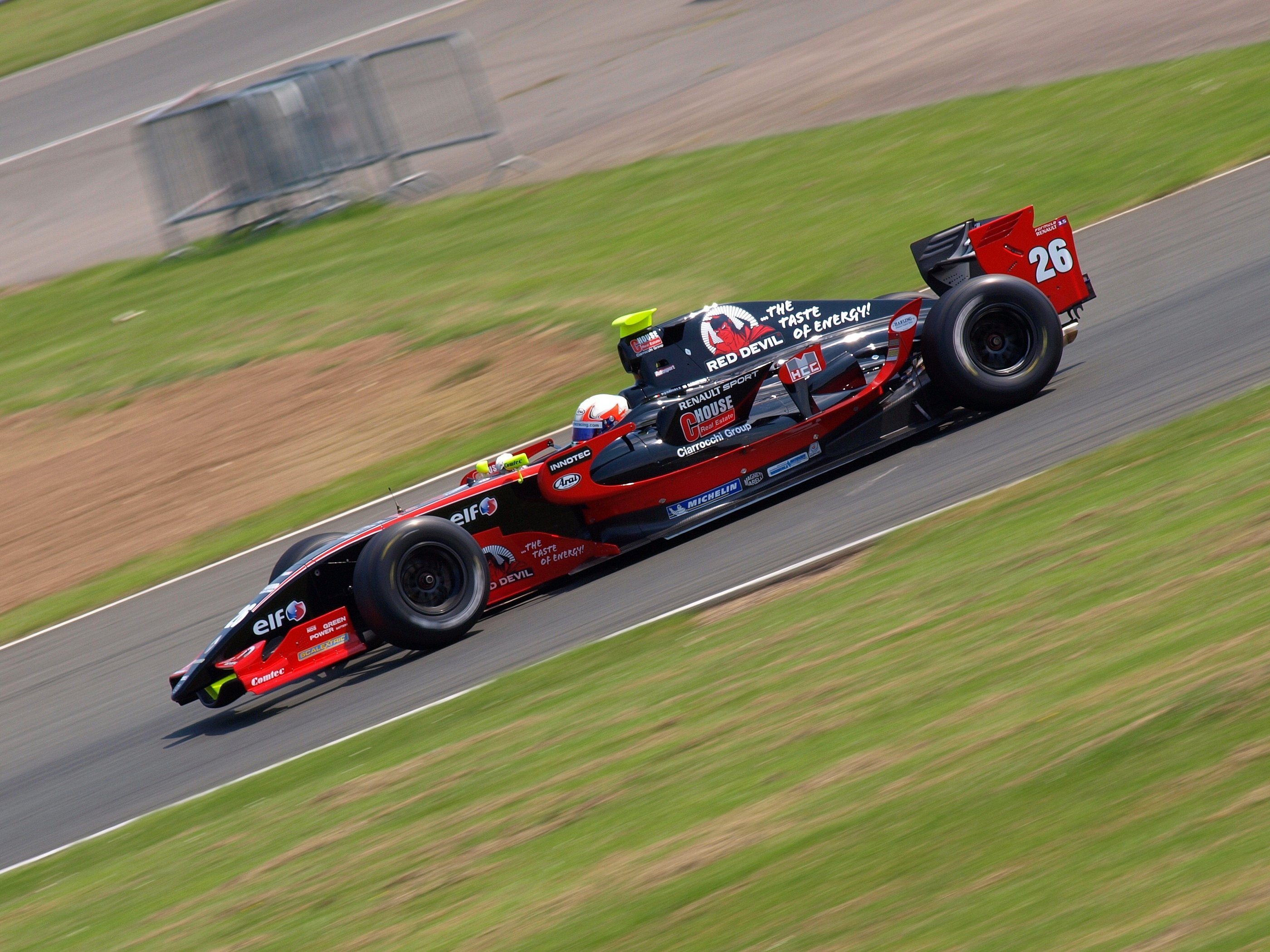
Pasquale Di Sabatino driving for Comtec at the Silverstone round of the 2008 World Series by Renault season.

Formula Renault 3.5 results
Year	Car	Drivers	Races	Wins	Poles	F.L.	Points	D.C.	T.C.
2006	Dallara T05–Renault	(Sweden) Alx Danielsson	17	4	3	2	112	1st	3rd
2006	Dallara T05–Renault	(United Kingdom) Edwin Jowsey	2	0	0	0	0	N/A	3rd
2006	Dallara T05–Renault	(Netherlands) Jaap van Lagen	5	0	0	0	8	28th	3rd
2006	Dallara T05–Renault	(Brazil) Carlos Iaconelli	2	0	0	0	0	N/A^{1}	3rd
2006	Dallara T05–Renault	(Spain) Celso Míguez	6	0	0	0	10^{2}	24th^{2}	3rd
2007	Dallara T05–Renault	(Netherlands) Jaap van Lagen	2	0	0	0	0	N/A^{3}	13th
2007	Dallara T05–Renault	(Romania) Michael Herck	14	0	0	0	0	N/A	13th
2007	Dallara T05–Renault	(Spain) Alejandro Núñez	16	1	0	0	31	18th	13th
2008	Dallara T08–Renault	(Italy) Marco Bonanomi	16	0	1	0	56	11th	8th
2008	Dallara T08–Renault	(Italy) Pasquale Di Sabatino	13	0	0	0	20	20th	8th
2008	Dallara T08–Renault	(Estonia) Sten Pentus	2	0	0	0	0	31st	8th
2009	Dallara T08–Renault	(Russia) Anton Nebylitskiy	4	0	0	0	0^{4}	29th^{4}	10th
2009	Dallara T08–Renault	(Australia) John Martin	7	0	0	0	8	22nd	10th
2009	Dallara T08–Renault	(South Africa) Cristiano Morgado	2	0	0	0	0	38th	10th
2009	Dallara T08–Renault	(Brazil) Alberto Valerio	2	0	0	0	0	36th	10th
2009	Dallara T08–Renault	(United Kingdom) Greg Mansell	2	0	0	0	1^{5}	26th^{5}	10th
2009	Dallara T08–Renault	(Latvia) Harald Schlegelmilch	2	0	0	0	0	37th	10th
2009	Dallara T08–Renault	(France) Alexandre Marsoin	1	0	0	0	0	41st	10th
2009	Dallara T08–Renault	(United Kingdom) Max Chilton	1	0	0	0	0	40th	10th
2009	Dallara T08–Renault	(United Kingdom) Jon Lancaster	12	1	2	1	39	13th	10th
2010	Dallara T08–Renault	(United Kingdom) Greg Mansell	17	0	0	0	23	15th	5th
2010	Dallara T08–Renault	(Monaco) Stefano Coletti	17	0	0	0	76	6th	5th
2011	Dallara T08–Renault	(United Kingdom) Daniel McKenzie	17	0	0	0	0	30th	13th
2011	Dallara T08–Renault	(Netherlands) Daniël de Jong	17	0	0	0	2	29th	13th
2012	Dallara FR35/12–Zytek	(Italy) Vittorio Ghirelli	17	0	0	0	5	23rd	7th
2012	Dallara FR35/12–Zytek	(United Kingdom) Nick Yelloly	17	2	1	0	122	5th	7th
2013	Dallara FR35/12–Zytek	(Russia) Daniil Move	17	0	0	0	12	22nd	13th
2013	Dallara FR35/12–Zytek	(Brazil) Lucas Foresti	17	0	0	0	0	NC	13th
2014	Dallara FR35/12–Zytek	(Russia) Nikolay Martsenko	4	0	0	0	36	14th	11th
2014	Dallara FR35/12–Zytek	(United Kingdom) Cameron Twynham	6	0	0	0	0	NC	11th
2014	Dallara FR35/12–Zytek	(Italy) Andrea Roda	1	0	0	0	0	NC	11th
2014	Dallara FR35/12–Zytek	(France) Esteban Ocon	2	0	0	0	2	21st	11th
2015	Dallara FR35/12–Zytek	(Switzerland) Louis Deletraz	2	0	0	0	0	NC	
2016	Dallara FR35/12–Zytek	(Australia) Thomas Randle	4	0	0	0	0	NC	

=== Auto GP ===
Auto GP results
Year	Drivers	Races	Wins	Poles	F.L.	Points	D.C.	T.C.
2013	(Venezuela) Roberto La Rocca	6	0	0	0	20	15th	9th

=== British Formula Ford ===
British Formula Ford results
Year	Car	Drivers	Races	Wins	Poles	F.L.	Points	D.C.	T.C.
2002	Van Diemen RF02	(United Kingdom) Westley Barber	18	8	6	7	487	1st	1st
2002	Van Diemen RF02	(United Kingdom) Stuart Hall	18	0	0	0	187	9th	1st
2002	Van Diemen RF02	(United Kingdom) Mike Conway	18	0	3	0	319	4th	1st
2002	Van Diemen RF02	(Belgium) Jan Heylen	18	5	1	2	453	3rd	1st
2003	Van Diemen RF03	(United Kingdom) Tom Gaymor	20	3	1	2	316	5th	3rd
2003	Van Diemen RF03	(United Kingdom) Oliver Jarvis	20	0	1	0	274	8th	3rd
2003	Van Diemen RF03	(United Kingdom) Dan Clarke	20	0	0	2	161	12th	3rd
2008	Comtec	(United Kingdom) Westley Barber	11	0	1	0	176	12th	7th
2008	Comtec	(Brazil) Francisco Weiler	13	0	0	0	16	22nd	7th

=== Formula Renault 2.0 UK Winter Series ===
Formula Renault 2.0 UK Winter Series results
Year	Car	Drivers	Races	Wins	Poles	F.L.	Points	D.C.	T.C.
2003	Tatuus FR2000–Renault	(United Kingdom) Westley Barber	4	2	1	1	52	2nd	3rd

=== Formula Renault 2.0 UK ===
Formula Renault 2.0 UK results
Year	Car	Drivers	Races	Wins	Poles	F.L.	Points	D.C.	T.C.
2004	Tatuus FR2000–Renault	(United Kingdom) Westley Barber	20	6	3	4	426	2nd	2nd
2004	Tatuus FR2000–Renault	(United Kingdom) Susie Wolff	20	0	0	0	284	5th	2nd
2006	Tatuus FR2000–Renault	(United Kingdom) Pippa Mann	16	0	0	0	86	19th	10th

=== Formula Renault Eurocup 2.0 ===
Eurocup Formula Renault 2.0 results
Year	Car	Drivers	Races	Wins	Poles	F.L.	Points	D.C.	T.C.
2005	Tatuus FR2000–Renault	(United Kingdom) Westley Barber	8	0	0	0	16	18th	12th
2005	Tatuus FR2000–Renault	(United Kingdom) Pippa Mann	15	0	0	0	0	39th	12th
2005	Tatuus FR2000–Renault	(Brazil) Gustavo Sondermann	2	0	0	0	0	N/A	12th
2006	Tatuus FR2000–Renault	(United Kingdom) Pippa Mann	16	0	0	0	86	19th	NC

=== Championnat de France Formula Renault 2.0 ===
Championnat de France Formula Renault 2.0 results
Year	Car	Drivers	Races	Wins	Poles	F.L.	Points	D.C.	T.C.
2005	Tatuus FR2000–Renault	(United Kingdom) Pippa Mann'	12	0	0	0	1	21st	8th
2005	Tatuus FR2000–Renault	(United Kingdom) Westley Barber'	10	1	1	2	86	5th	8th

=== Formula Three ===
British Formula 3 results
Year	Car	Drivers	Races	Wins	Poles	F.L.	Points	D.C.	T.C.
2006	Dallara F304–Mugen-Honda	(Lebanon) Basil Shaaban	4	0	0	0	0	N/A	N/A

=== Monoposto 2000 ===
Monoposto 2000 results
Year	Car	Drivers	Races	Wins	Poles	F.L.	Points	D.C.	T.C.
2003	Van Diemen Comtec 2003 Zetec	(United Kingdom) Jonathan Lewis	6	5	5	4	90	1st	1st
2004	Van Diemen Comtec 2004 Zetec	(United Kingdom) Jonathan Lewis	6	3	4	4	77	1st	1st

=== 750MC Formula 4 ===
750MC Formula 4 results
Year	Car	Drivers	Races	Wins	Poles	F.L.	Points	D.C.	T.C.
2003	Comtec F4	(United Kingdom) Jonathan Lewis	12	6	7	4	235	1st	2nd
2003	Comtec F4	(United Kingdom) Chris Lewis	4	0		1	60	11th	2nd
2004	Comtec F4	(United Kingdom) Jonathan Lewis	7	4	2	2	105	7th	6th
2004	Comtec F4	(United Kingdom) John Roberts	5	0	0	1	60	18th	6th
2005	Comtec F4	(United Kingdom) Chris Lewis	5	2	0	1	120	7th	2nd
2005	Comtec F4	(United Kingdom) Steve Patania	11	3	1	2	196	3rd	2nd
2005	Comtec F4	(United Kingdom) John Roberts	7	0	1	0	166	4th	2nd
2006	Comtec F4	(United Kingdom) Chris Lewis	11	6	7	5	294.8	1st	1st
2006	Comtec F4	(United Kingdom) Steve Patania	11	1	1	2	166	6th	1st

=== Saxmax ===
Citroen Saxmax results
Year	Car	Drivers	Races	Wins	Poles	F.L.	Points	D.C.
2006	Citroen Saxo VTR	(United Kingdom) Ben Kidd	9	0	0	0	190	10th

Notes:

- 1. - Iaconelli also entered in 4 races for EuroInternational and 6 races for GD Racing.
- 2. - Míguez also scored 1 point in 11 races for Pons Racing.
- 3. - van Lagen also entered in 2 races for EuroInternational.
- 4. - Nebylitskiy also scored 1 point in 13 races for SG Formula.
- 5. - Greg Mansell also scored 3 points in 13 races for Ultimate Motorsport.
