= Jon Lewis =

Jon Lewis may refer to:

- Jon Lewis (cricketer, born 1970), English batsman for Durham and Essex
- Jon Lewis (cricketer, born 1975), English bowler for Gloucestershire, Surrey, Sussex, and England
- Jon Peter Lewis (born 1979), American singer and songwriter
- J. S. Lewis (Jon Samuel Lewis), fiction writer
- Jon Lewis, musician in Hyland
- Jon Lewis, musician in The Dopamines
- Jon Lewis (cartoonist), see Alternative Comics

== See also ==
- Jonathan Lewis (disambiguation)
- John Lewis (disambiguation)
