= Jack Lewis =

Jack Lewis may refer to:

== Authors ==
- C. S. Lewis (1898–1963), British author, scholar, and theologian, known to his friends as "Jack"
- Jack Lewis (screenwriter) (1924–2009), American screenwriter, stuntman, and U.S. Marine
- Jack Lewis (author) (born 1964), American author and Motorcyclist magazine columnist

== Sports ==
- Jack Lewis (baseball) (1884–1956), American player
- Jack Lewis (equestrian) (born 1902), Irish Olympic equestrian
- Jack Lewis (footballer, born 1902) (1902–?), Welsh footballer who played for Cardiff City and Newport County
- Jack Lewis (footballer, born 1912) (1912–?), Welsh footballer who played for Stoke City
- Jack Lewis (footballer, born 1919) (1919–2002), English footballer who played for Crystal Palace, Bournemouth and Reading
- Jack Lewis (footballer, born 1948), Wales under-23 international footballer who played for Grimsby Town
- Jackie Lewis (born 1936), British racing driver
- Jack Lewis (bowls), Welsh lawn bowler

== Other ==
- Jack Windsor Lewis (1926–2021), British phonetician
- Jack Lewis, Baron Lewis of Newnham (1928–2014), English chemist
- Jack P. Lewis (born 1919), American Bible scholar
- Jack Lewis (musician) (born 1980), American musician
- Jack Patrick Lewis (born 1984), American politician
- Jack Clark Lewis (1935–2022), president and CEO of Amdahl Corporation

== See also ==
- John Lewis (disambiguation)
