= Wayne Boyd =

British racing driver (born 1990)

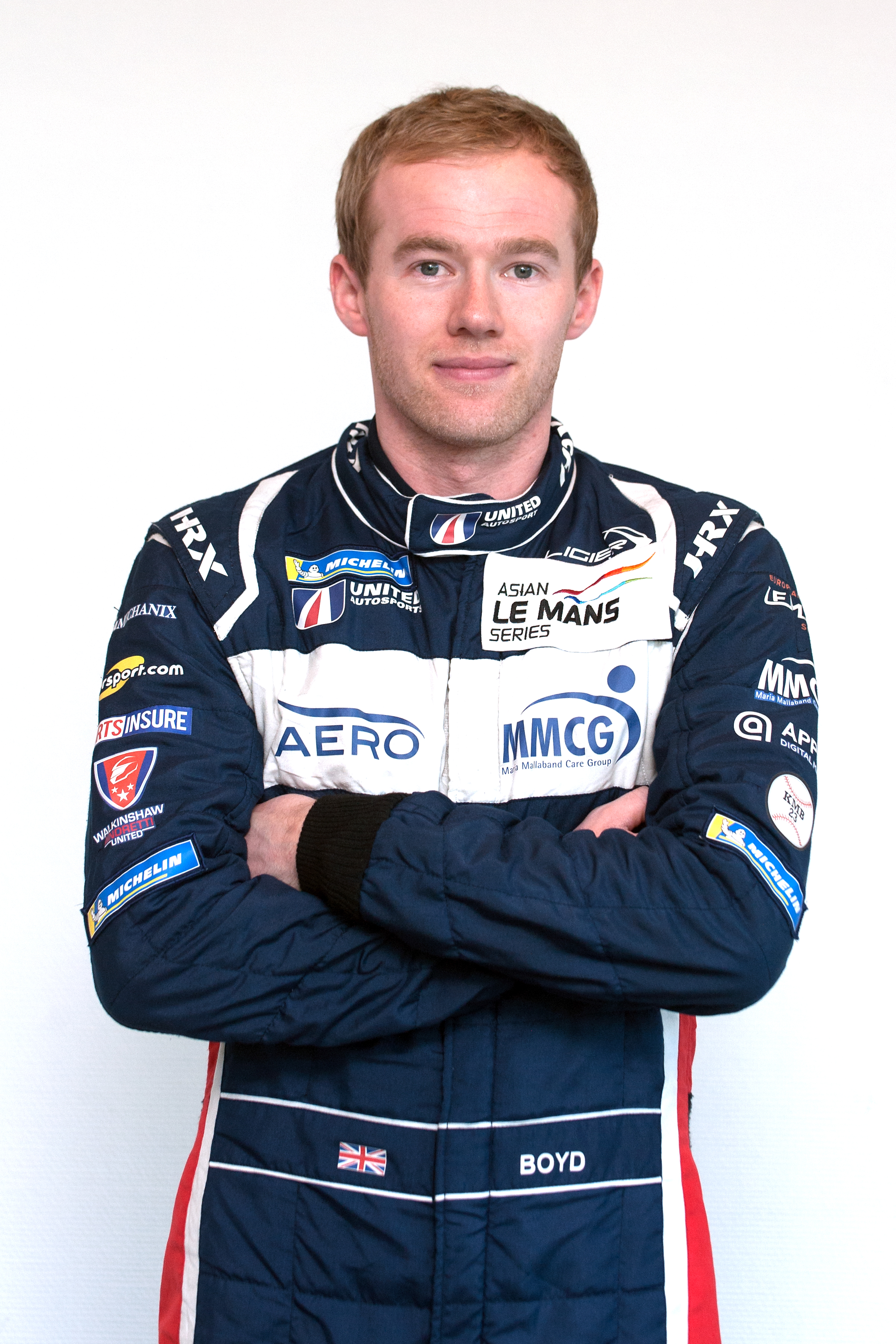
- Wayne Boyd at the 2018 4 Hours of Shanghai
- Nationality: British
- Born: 25 October 1990 (age 36) County Antrim, Northern Ireland
- Debut season: 2011
- Categorisation: FIA Silver (until 2021); FIA Gold (2022–)
- Car number: 4
- Former teams: Belardi Auto Racing
- Starts: 12
- Wins: 2
- Poles: 0
- Fastest laps: 0
- Best finish: 1st in 2011

Previous series
- 2009–2010 2008 2008: British Formula Three Championship; British Formula Ford; Formula Renault UK Winter Series

Championship titles
- 2008 2008: British Formula Ford; Formula Ford Festival

Wayne Boyd (born 25 October 1990) is a British racing driver from County Antrim, Northern Ireland.

Boyd won the British Formula Ford Championship in 2008 with Jamun Racing. He won 13 out of 25 championship races. He sat on the pole for 15 races and was on the podium 20 times out of 25 races. In the same year, he won the Formula Ford Festival Duratec class. His dominate performance earned him named as one of British Racing Driver Club Superstars and nominated for the BRDC McLaren Autosport Award. Boyd also won the Walter Hayes Trophy in 2014 and won the Formula Ford Festival for a second time in 2015.

In 2009, Boyd raced full-time in the British Formula Three Championship for T-Sport and won a race at Donington Park. He started that race outside thetop-ten and in the rain raced his way to the win on slicks. At the Macau GP, Boyd walked away from an incredible crash - surviving after landing upside down and will be remembered as a great escape. He finished 12th in points overall. He was again nominated as BRDC Superstars and British MSA Race Elite Driver.

In 2010, financial constraints only allowed Boyd to make two one-off races Hockenheimring for Sino Vision Racing in British F3, the second was the F3 Masters event at Zandvoort in which he started 24th on the grid and finished eighth in poor weather conditions.

In 2011, Boyd signed to race for Belardi Auto Racing in the U.S. F2000 National Championship in America. The deal came together days before the start of the season. He captured two wins, including one on the oval at the Milwaukee Mile, six podiums in total and finished third in the Championship points behind Petri Suvanto and Spencer Pigot.

In 2012, Boyd raced two event weekends for Belardi Auto Racing at Baltimore and Virginia International Raceway posting a third- and second-place finish at VIR.

Early years: Boyd starting karting in September 2001 in the cadet class (Zip kart) finishing in the top-ten in his first year in the Northern Irish Championship. Contested the Five Nations Championship at Nutts Corner finishing fifth. His first championships were in 2004 winning the Ulster Championship at Nutts Corner, the Five Nations Championship (NC Plate Winner). He raced for Maranello in 2005 placing first in the Ulster Cup and second in the Northern Ireland Karting Association. In 2006, he stepped up to Intrepid Karts and continued placing first and second in Ulster championships.

In 2007, Boyd raced Formula Ford 1600 and won the Northern Irish FF1600 Championship. He was named Novice of the Year. He set new track records on his first visits to Knockhill; Mondello Park; Brands Hatch during the Formula Ford Festival and at Silverstone during the Walter Hayes Trophy.

== Racing Record ==
=== Career summary ===
Season	Series	Team	Races	Wins	Poles	F/Laps	Podiums	Points	Position
2008	British Formula Ford Championship	Jamun Racing	25	13	14	14	20	659	1st
2009	British Formula 3 International Series	T-Sport	19	1	0	0	1	50	12th
2009	Macau Grand Prix	Hitech Racing	0	0	0	0	0	N/A	DNS
2010	British Formula 3 International Series	Sino Vision Racing	3	0	0	0	0	0	19th
2010	Masters of Formula 3	Sino Vision Racing	1	0	0	0	0	N/A	8th
2011	U.S. F2000 National Championship	Belardi Auto Racing	12	2	0	0	6	229	**3rd**
2012	U.S. F2000 National Championship	Belardi Auto Racing	4	0	0	0	0	0	NC†
2016	European Le Mans Series - LMP3	United Autosports	6	0	1	0	3	59	5th
2017	European Le Mans Series - LMP3	United Autosports	6	1	1	1	2	63	**3rd**
2018	European Le Mans Series - LMP2	United Autosports	6	0	0	0	1	23	13th
2018-19	Asian Le Mans Series - LMP3	United Autosports	4	1	2	0	3	70	**2nd**
2019	European Le Mans Series - LMP3	United Autosports	6	0	0	0	4	71	4th
2019	Le Mans Cup - LMP3	United Autosports	5	0	0	0	1	29.5	6th
2020	European Le Mans Series - LMP3	United Autosports	5	3	4	3	4	94	**1st**
2020	Le Mans Cup - LMP3	United Autosports	7	0	1	1	0	34.5	10th
2021	FIA World Endurance Championship - LMP2	United Autosports USA	1	0	0	0	1	23	16th
2021	Asian Le Mans Series - LMP3	United Autosports	4	3	3	0	3	78	**1st**
2021	European Le Mans Series - LMP3	United Autosports	6	0	1	1	4	75.5	**3rd**
2021	Le Mans Cup - LMP3	United Autosports	5	0	0	0	2	48	6th
2021	24 Hours of Le Mans - LMP2	United Autosports	1	0	0	0	0	N/A	4th
2021	IMSA SportsCar Championship - LMP2	United Autosports	3	0	0	0	1	920	8th
2021	IMSA SportsCar Championship - LMP3	Sean Creech Motorsport	1	0	0	0	1	0	NC
2022	Le Mans Cup - LMP3	United Autosports	7	0	0	1	1	25	10th
2022	IMSA SportsCar Championship - LMP3	Forty7 Motorsports	1	0	0	0	0	254	33rd
2023	Le Mans Cup - LMP3	United Autosports	7	1	0	1	1	35	8th
2023	IMSA SportsCar Championship - LMP3	AWA	7	2	0	0	4	1870	4th
2024	European Le Mans Series - LMP2 Pro-Am	Team Virage	1	0	0	0	0	6	16th
2024	Le Mans Cup - LMP3	Nielsen Racing	7	0	0	0	2	47.5	6th
2024	Gulf 12 Hours	Dragon Racing	1	0	0	0	0	N/A	10th
2025	European Le Mans Series - LMGT3	United Autosports	6	0	0	2	1	19	14th
2025-26	Asian Le Mans Series - GT	United Autosports	6	0	0	2	0	14	17th
2026	European Le Mans Series - LMGT3	United Autosports	6	0	0	2	1	4	31st
2026	Le Mans Cup - LMP3	M Racing	1	0	0	0	0	0	NC†

† Guest driver ineligible for points

=== American open-wheel racing results ===
==== U.S. F2000 National Championship ====
(key) (Races in bold indicate pole position; results in italics indicate fastest lap)

Year	Team	1	2	3	4	5	6	7	8	9	10	11	12	13	14	Rank	Points
2011	Belardi Auto Racing	SEB; 11	SEB; 6	STP; 7	STP; 3	ORP; 5	MIL; 1	MOH; 2	MOH; 2	ROA; 10	ROA; 3	BAL; 1	BAL; 15			**3rd**	**229**
2012	Belardi Auto Racing	SEB	SEB	STP	STP	LOR	MOH	MOH	ROA	ROA	ROA	BAL; 26	BAL; 11	VIR; 3	VIR; 2	NC‡	0‡

‡ Unregistered drivers ineligible for points

=== Complete European Le Mans Series results ===
(key) (Races in bold indicate pole position; results in italics indicate fastest lap)

Year	Entrant	Class	Chassis	Engine	1	2	3	4	5	6	Rank	Points
2016	United Autosports	LMP3	Ligier JS P3	Nissan VK50VE 5.0 L V8	SIL; 2	**IMO**; 7	RBR; 14	LEC; 11	SPA; 3	EST; 2	5th	59
2017	United Autosports	LMP3	Ligier JS P3	Nissan VK50VE 5.0 L V8	SIL; 3	**MNZ**; 4	RBR; Ret	LEC; Ret	SPA; 5	ALG; 1	3rd	63
2018	United Autosports	LMP2	Ligier JS P217	Gibson GK428 4.2 L V8	LEC; 9	MNZ; 11	RBR; 15	SIL; 10	SPA; 6	ALG; 3	13th	23
2019	United Autosports	LMP3	Ligier JS P3	Nissan VK50VE 5.0 L V8	LEC; 6	MNZ; 3	CAT; 3	SIL; 3	SPA; Ret	ALG; 2	4th	71
2020	United Autosports	LMP3	Ligier JS P320	Nissan VK56DE 5.6 L V8	LEC; 1	SPA; 1	LEC; Ret	MNZ; 3	ALG; 1		1st	94
2021	United Autosports	LMP3	Ligier JS P320	Nissan VK56DE 5.6 L V8	CAT; 13	RBR; 6	LEC; 3	MNZ; 2	SPA; 3	ALG; 2	3rd	75.5
2024	Team Virage	LMP2 Pro-Am	Oreca 07	Gibson GK428 4.2 L V8	CAT	LEC	IMO	SPA; 7	MUG	ALG	16th	26
2025	United Autosports	LMGT3	McLaren 720S GT3 Evo	McLaren M840T 4.0 L Turbo V8	CAT; 11	LEC; 11	IMO; 10	SPA; Ret	SIL; Ret	ALG; 2	14th	19
2026	United Autosports	LMGT3	McLaren 720S GT3 Evo	McLaren M840T 4.0 L Turbo V8	CAT; 2	LEC; Ret	IMO; Ret	SPA; 10	SIL; 9	ALG; 10	32nd	4

=== Complete Asian Le Mans Series results ===
(key) (Races in bold indicate pole position; results in italics indicate fastest lap)

Year	Entrant	Class	Chassis	Engine	1	2	3	4	5	6	Rank	Points
2018–19	United Autosports	LMP3	Ligier JS P3	Nissan VK50VE 5.0 L V8	SHA; 2	FUJ; 5	**BUR**; 1	**SEP**; 3			2nd	70
2021	United Autosports	LMP3	Ligier JS P320	Nissan VK55DE 5.6 L V8	**DUB**; **1**; 1	**DUB**; **2**; 1	**ABU**; **1** Ret	ABU; 2; 1			1st	78
2025–26	United Autosports	GT	McLaren 720S GT3 Evo	McLaren M840T 4.0 L Turbo V8	SEP; 1; 13	SEP; 2; 16	DUB; 1; 16	DUB; 2; 7	ABU; 1; 15	ABU; 2; 6	17th	14

=== Complete IMSA SportsCar Championship results ===
(key) (Races in bold indicate pole position; results in italics indicate fastest lap)

Year	Team	Class	Make	Engine	1	2	3	4	5	6	7	8	Pos.	Points
2021	Sean Creech Motorsport	LMP3	Ligier JS P320	Nissan VK56DE 5.6 L V8	DAY; 2‡		MOH						NC	0
2021	United Autosports	LMP2	Oreca 07	Gibson GK428 4.2 L V8		SEB; 5†		WGL; 3	WGL	ELK	LGA	PET; 4	8th	920
2022	Forty7 Motorsports	LMP3	Duqueine M30 - D08	Nissan VK56DE 5.6 L V8	DAY	SEB	MOH	WGL; 8	MOS	ELK	PET		33rd	254
2023	AWA	LMP3	Duqueine M30 - D08	Nissan VK56DE 5.6 L V8	DAY; 1	SEB; 4	WGL; 3	MOS; 3	ELK; 5	IMS; 1	PET; 6		4th	1870

‡: Points count towards Michelin Endurance Cup championship only.
†: Post-event penalty. Car moved to back of class.

=== Complete FIA World Endurance Championship results ===
(key) (Races in bold indicate pole position; results in italics indicate fastest lap)

Year	Entrant	Class	Car	Engine	1	2	3	4	5	6	Rank	Points
2021	United Autosports USA	LMP2	Oreca 07	Gibson GK428 4.2 L V8	SPA	ALG; 3	MNZ	LMS	BHR	BHR	16th	23

=== Complete 24 Hours of Le Mans results ===
Year	Team	Co-Drivers	Car	Class	Laps	Pos.	Class Pos.
2021	(United Kingdom) United Autosports	(United Kingdom) Alex Lynn (United Kingdom) Paul di Resta	Oreca 07-Gibson	LMP2	361	9th	4th

Sporting positions
Preceded by Callum MacLeod	British Formula Ford; Champion; 2008	Succeeded by James Cole
