= 2018 Alpine Elf Europa Cup =

Car race in Europe

The 2018 Alpine Elf Europa Cup was the inaugural season of the Alpine Elf Europa Cup, the one-make sports car racing series organized by Alpine for Alpine A110 Cup cars. It began on 27 April at Le Castellet and finished on 12 October, at Monza after six double-header meetings.

== Entry list ==
Team	No.	Drivers	Class	Rounds
(France) CMR-CCF	2	(France) Vincent Beltoise		All
(France) Milan Competition	3	(France) Denis Gibaud (Note: Drivers who started their first race of the season at the penultimate or final rounds are ineligible for points and invisible as far as awarding points to other drivers.)	G	6
(France) Milan Competition	8	(France) Nicolas Milan		All
(France) Milan Competition	9	(Belgium) Phillippe Bourgois	G	1–2
(France) Milan Competition	9	(France) Jean-Marc Thévenot	G	3
(France) Milan Competition	9	(Italy) Alessandro Sebasti Scalera	G	5
(France) Milan Competition	12	(France) Marc Guillot		2–3, 5–6
(France) Milan Competition	15	(France) Gaël Castelli		4–6
(France) Milan Competition	77	(Estonia) Thomas Padovani		All
(France) Milan Competition	77	(Estonia) Sten Pentus		5
(France) Racing Technology	4	(France) Mathieu Blaise		All
(France) Racing Technology	11	(France) Sylvain Noël	G	All
(France) Racing Technology	110	(France) Eric Helary (Note: Guest drivers in the #110 Racing Technology entry are ineligible for points and invisible as far as awarding points to other drivers.)	G G	1
(France) Racing Technology	110	(France) Thierry Soave	G G	1
(France) Racing Technology	110	(Germany) Paul Englert	G	2
(France) Racing Technology	110	(France) Bernard Romain	G	3
(France) Racing Technology	110	(France) Mathieu Sentis	G	3
(France) Racing Technology	110	(United Kingdom) Oliver Webb	G	4
(France) Racing Technology	110	(Belgium) Stéphane Lémeret	G G	5
(France) Racing Technology	110	(Spain) Jaime Hernandez	G	6
(France) Automeca-Super U	5	(France) Stéphane Proux		1–2, 3, 5–6
(France) Automeca-Super U	5	(France) Emmanuel Guigou		1–2
(France) Automeca-RCC	7	(France) Franc Rouxel	G	All
(Spain) Team VRT	9	(Spain) Marc de Fulgencio	J	6
(France) Autosport GP	14	(France) Marc Sevestre	G	1, 3, 5
(France) Autosport GP	14	(France) Julien Neveu		2, 4, 6
(France) Autosport GP	17	(France) Jean-Baptiste Mela	J	All
(France) Autosport GP	18	(France) Pierre Macchi	G	1–2, 4, 6
(France) Autosport GP	18	(France) Pierre Combot		3, 5–6
(France) Team Duty Car	29	(Italy) Alessandro Sebasti Scalera	G	1
(France) Team Duty Car	29	(France) Lucas Lasserre		2–3
(France) Team Duty Car	29	(France) Jean-Philippe Desplat	G	5
(France) CMR-GRR	33	(Monaco) Grégory Romano	G	1–3, 5–6
(France) Autosport GP-Patrick Roger	69	(France) Laurent Hurgon	G	All
(France) CMR	76	(France) Pierre Sancinéna		All

Icon	Class
G	Gentlemen
J	Junior
G	Guest

== Race calendar and results ==
- A five-round calendar was revealed along with the announcement of the series on 26 October 2017. The schedule consisted of 5 circuits for the first year of the series with all rounds supporting either the International GT Open or the FFSA GT Championship.

Round		Circuit	Date	Pole position	Race winner	Junior Winner	Gentlemen Winner
1	R1	(France) Circuit Paul Ricard, Le Castellet	1 June	(France) No. 76 CMR	(France) No. 76 CMR	(France) No. 17 Autosport GP	(France) No. 11 Racing Technology
1	R1	(France) Circuit Paul Ricard, Le Castellet	1 June	(France) Pierre Sancinéna	(France) Pierre Sancinéna	(France) Jean-Baptiste Mela	(France) Sylvain Noël
1	R2	(France) Circuit Paul Ricard, Le Castellet	2 June	(France) No. 76 CMR	(France) No. 2 CMR-CFF	(France) No. 17 Autosport GP	(France) No. 11 Racing Technology
1	R2	(France) Circuit Paul Ricard, Le Castellet	2 June	(France) Pierre Sancinéna	(France) Vincent Beltoise	(France) Jean-Baptiste Mela	(France) Sylvain Noël
2	R1	(Germany) Nürburgring	22 June	(France) No. 76 CMR	(France) No. 76 CMR	(France) No. 17 Autosport GP	(France) No. 69 Autosport GP-Patrick Roger
2	R1	(Germany) Nürburgring	22 June	(France) Pierre Sancinéna	(France) Pierre Sancinéna	(France) Jean-Baptiste Mela	(France) Laurent Hurgon
2	R2	(Germany) Nürburgring	23 June	(France) No. 76 CMR	(France) No. 76 CMR	(France) No. 17 Autosport GP	(France) No. 11 Racing Technology
2	R2	(Germany) Nürburgring	23 June	(France) Pierre Sancinéna	(France) Pierre Sancinéna	(France) Jean-Baptiste Mela	(France) Sylvain Noël
3	R1	(France) Dijon-Prenois	14 July	(France) No. 76 CMR	(France) No. 76 CMR	(France) No. 17 Autosport GP	(France) No. 11 Racing Technology
3	R1	(France) Dijon-Prenois	14 July	(France) Pierre Sancinéna	(France) Pierre Sancinéna	(France) Jean-Baptiste Mela	(France) Sylvain Noël
3	R2	(France) Dijon-Prenois	15 July	(France) No. 8 Milan Competition	(France) No. 12 Milan Competition	(France) No. 17 Autosport GP	(France) No. 11 Racing Technology
3	R2	(France) Dijon-Prenois	15 July	(France) Nicolas Milan	(France) Marc Guillot	(France) Jean-Baptiste Mela	(France) Sylvain Noël
4	R1	(United Kingdom) Silverstone Circuit	1 September	(France) No. 110 Racing Technology	(France) No. 110 Racing Technology	(France) No. 17 Autosport GP	(France) No. 11 Racing Technology
4	R1	(United Kingdom) Silverstone Circuit	1 September	(United Kingdom) Oliver Webb	(United Kingdom) Oliver Webb	(France) Jean-Baptiste Mela	(France) Sylvain Noël
4	R2	(United Kingdom) Silverstone Circuit	2 September	(France) No. 110 Racing Technology	(France) No. 110 Racing Technology	(France) No. 17 Autosport GP	(France) No. 11 Racing Technology
4	R2	(United Kingdom) Silverstone Circuit	2 September	(United Kingdom) Oliver Webb	(United Kingdom) Oliver Webb	(France) Jean-Baptiste Mela	(France) Sylvain Noël
5	R1	(Belgium) Circuit de Spa-Francorchamps	22 September	(France) No. 110 Racing Technology	(France) No. 110 Racing Technology	(France) No. 17 Autosport GP	(France) No. 69 Autosport GP-Patrick Roger
5	R1	(Belgium) Circuit de Spa-Francorchamps	22 September	(Belgium) Stéphane Lémeret	(Belgium) Stéphane Lémeret	(France) Jean-Baptiste Mela	(France) Laurent Hurgon
5	R2	(Belgium) Circuit de Spa-Francorchamps	23 September	(France) No. 110 Racing Technology	(France) No. 110 Racing Technology	(France) No. 17 Autosport GP	(France) No. 11 Racing Technology
5	R2	(Belgium) Circuit de Spa-Francorchamps	23 September	(Belgium) Stéphane Lémeret	(Belgium) Stéphane Lémeret	(France) Jean-Baptiste Mela	(France) Sylvain Noël
6	R1	(Spain) Circuit de Barcelona-Catalunya	21 October	(France) No. 8 Milan Competition	(France) No. 8 Milan Competition	(Spain) No. 9 Team VRT	(France) No. 11 Racing Technology
6	R1	(Spain) Circuit de Barcelona-Catalunya	21 October	(France) Nicolas Milan	(France) Nicolas Milan	(Spain) Marc de Fulgencio	(France) Sylvain Noël
6	R2	(Spain) Circuit de Barcelona-Catalunya	21 October	(France) No. 69 Autosport GP-Patrick Roger	(France) No. 8 Milan Competition	(France) No. 17 Autosport GP	(France) No. 11 Racing Technology
6	R2	(Spain) Circuit de Barcelona-Catalunya	21 October	(France) Laurent Hurgon	(France) Nicolas Milan	(France) Jean-Baptiste Mela	(France) Sylvain Noël

=== Drivers' Championship ===
Scoring system

Points are awarded to the top 20 drivers. If less than 75% of the race distance is completed then half points are awarded. If less than two laps are completed then no points are given.

Position	1st	2nd	3rd	4th	5th	6th	7th	8th	9th	10th	11th-20th	PP	FL
Points	20	15	12	10	8	6	5	4	3	2	1	1	1

Pos.	Driver	LEC (France)		NÜR (Germany)		DIJ (France)		SIL (United Kingdom)		SPA (Belgium)		CAT (Spain)		Pts.
1	(France) Pierre Sancinéna	1	15	1	1	1	9	5	9	8	4	6	4	138
2	(France) Nicolas Milan	2	2	3	3	11	7	8	5	5	7	1	1	137
3	(France) Sylvain Noël	3	4	6	4	3	3	6	6	7	2	5	6	119
4	(France) Jean-Baptiste Mela	4	3	15	5	Ret	2	4	7	4	6	9	5	101
5	(France) Vincent Beltoise	10	1	16	6	5	5	2	3	6	8	Ret	14	99
6	(France) Gaël Castelli							3	2	2	3	3	Ret	90
7	(France) Marc Guillot			5	8	2	1			17	9	2	2	84
8	(France) Laurent Hurgon	11	5	2	17	4	4	Ret	8	3	10	Ret	9	77
9	(France) Julien Neveu			4	2			7	4			4	3	66
10	(Estonia) Thomas Padovani	5	6	11	13	8	11	10	Ret	9		10	7	39
11	(France) Mathieu Blaise	16	10	7	10	9	12	9	10	11	12	8	10	33
12	(France) Lucas Lasserre			17	9	7	6							17
13	(Monaco) Grégory Romano	8	13	12	14	14	15			14	14	11	12	16
14	(France) Marc Sevestre	7	9			10	13			12	15			14
15	(France) Franc Rouxel	13	14	14	15	16	17	12	11	15	16	12	16	13
16	(Italy) Alessandro Sebasti Scalera	12	8							10	11			11
17	(France) Pierre Combot					6	10			18	DNS		Ret	10
18	(France) Pierre Macchi	9	12	13	12			11	12			Ret		10
19	(France) Emmanuel Guigou		7	10										8
20	(Belgium) Phillippe Bourgois	15	11	9	11									8
21	(France) Stéphane Proux	14			16	15	16			16	17	13	15	8
22	(France) Jean-Marc Thévenot					12	14							2
Drivers ineligible to score points
	(France) Eric Helary	6												
	(France) Thierry Soave		Ret											
	(Germany) Paul Englert			8	7									
	(France) Bernard Romain					13								
	(France) Mathieu Sentis						8							
	(United Kingdom) Oliver Webb							1	1					
	(Belgium) Stéphane Lémeret									1	1			
	(France) Jean-Philippe Desplat									13	13			
	(Estonia) Sten Pentus										5			
	(Spain) Marc de Fulgencio											7	8	
	(Spain) Jaime Hernandez											14	11	
	(France) Denis Gibaud											Ret	13	
Pos.	Driver	LEC (France)		NÜR (Germany)		DIJ (France)		SIL (United Kingdom)		SPA (Belgium)		CAT (Spain)		Pts.
