= John Louis =

John Louis may refer to:

- John Louis, Count of Nassau-Saarbrücken (1472–1545), posthumous son of Count John II
- John Louis of Elderen (1620–1694), bishop of Liège
- John Louis, Count of Nassau-Ottweiler (1625–1690)
- John Louis I, Prince of Anhalt-Dornburg (1656–1704), German prince
- John Louis II, Prince of Anhalt-Zerbst (1688–1746), German prince
- Sir John Louis, 2nd Baronet (1785–1863), admiral in the Royal Navy
- John J. Louis Jr. (1925–1995), American businessman and ambassador to the United Kingdom
- John Louis (speedway rider) (1941–2024), British motorcycle racer
- John Jeffry Louis III (born 1963), British businessman

== See also ==
- John Lewis (disambiguation)
