= Victor Corrêa =

Brazilian racing driver

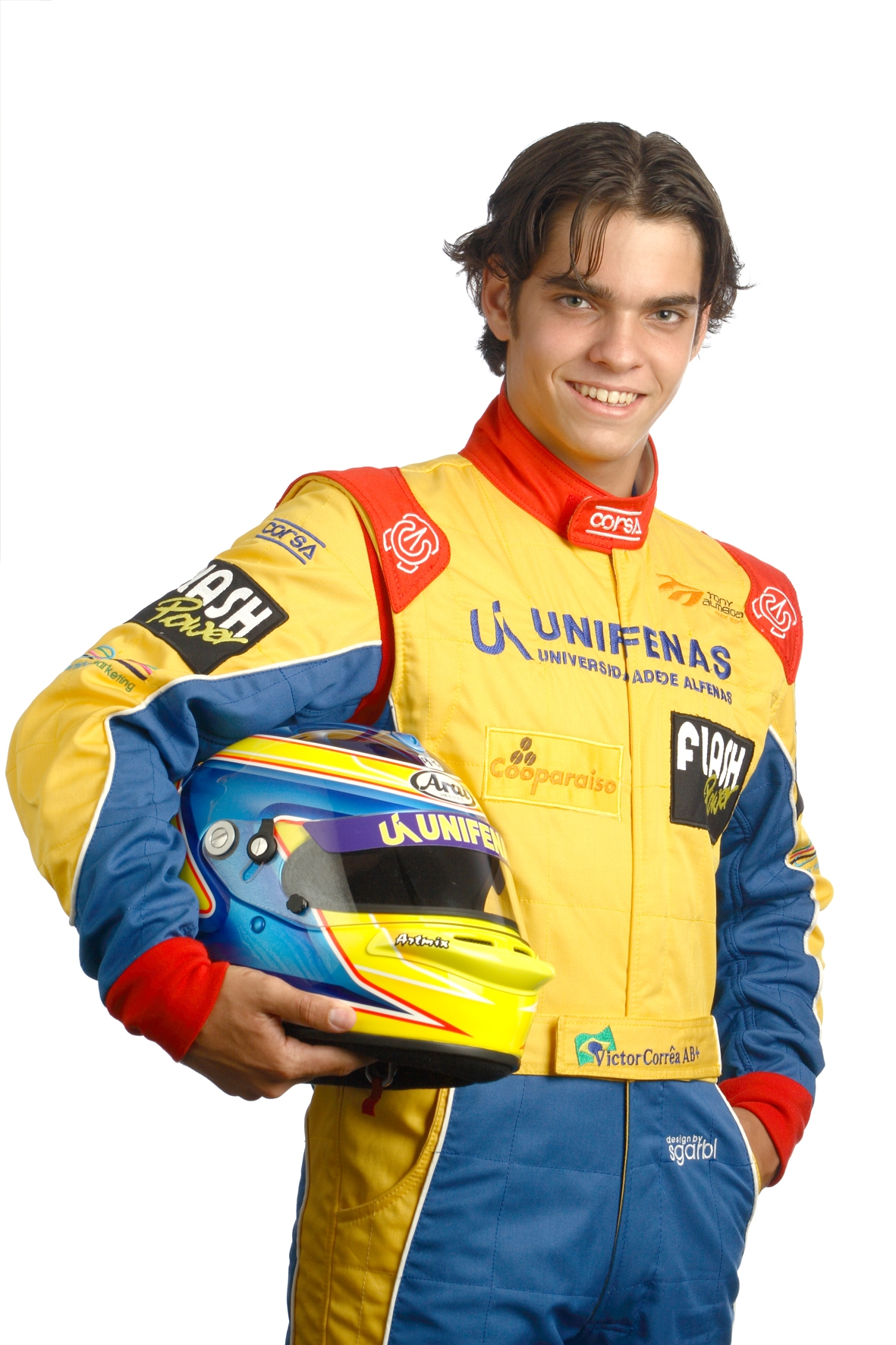
- Nationality: (Brazil) Brazilian
- Born: March 14, 1990 (age 36) Alfenas, Brazil

European F3 Open Championship career
- Debut season: 2010
- Current team: Team West-Tec
- Car number: 3
- Former teams: Team West-Tec
- Starts: 28
- Wins: 3
- Poles: 0
- Best finish: 6th in 2011

Championship titles
- 2007 Formula São Paulo season

Victor Corrêa (born March 14, 1990, in Alfenas) is a Brazilian former racing driver who last competed in the European F3 Open Championship.

== Career ==
Corrêa began his career in karting in 1999 in Alfenas at nine years old competing in the regional championships. He soon won the South-Mineiro Champion in the Cadet category. Later, he became the Mineiro Champion in Junior Minor category and Mineiro championship in Junior category, along with excellent results in the competitive Paulista Championship and also in the Brazilian Championship.

In 2006, Corrêa debuted in Formula São Paulo. In the following year, he won the category title with a round to spare.

In 2008, Corrêa came in fourth place in the British Formula Ford Championship.

In 2009, Corrêa joined the Litespeed team in the British Formula Three National Class, finishing in third place.

In 2010, Corrêa competed in the first half of the British Formula Renault Championship with CRS Racing team but his performance was poor.

During the second half of 2010, Corrêa competed in the European F3 Open with Team West-Tec and took two wins at Monza. He had one win overall in his Copa car.

== Racing record ==
=== Career summary ===
Season	Series	Team	Races	Wins	Poles	F/Laps	Podiums	Points	Position
2006	Formula São Paulo	Alpie Comeptições	8	0	0	0	2	58	6th
2007	Formula São Paulo	Alpie Comeptições	10	4	3	4	6	117	1st
2008	British Formula Ford Championship	Jamun Racing	25	2	1	1	8	414	4th
2008	Formula Ford Festival	Jamun Racing	1	0	0	0	0	N/A	10th
2009	British Formula 3 International Series - National	Litespeed F3	20	1	0	0	10	184	3rd
2010	Formula Renault UK	CRS Racing	7	0	0	0	0	42	19th
2010	European F3 Open	Team West-Tec	12	1	0	0	1	28	12th
2011	European F3 Open Championship	Team West-Tec	16	2	0	0	3	59	6th
2012	Radical UK Cup - Masters	Marks Electricals	4	0	2	1	1	35	12th
2012	Radical European Masters - Masters	Marks Electricals	2	0	0	1	0	0	NC
2013	Radical European Masters	Marks Electricals	14	4	6	4	9	159	1st
2014	Copa Petrobras de Marcas	Amir Nasr Racing	2	0	0	0	0	12	24th
2015	Radical European Masters - Masters	Nielsen Racing	16	1	5	5	7	331	2nd
