= 2004 Formula BMW ADAC season =

2004 Formula BMW ADAC

Seasons
- ← 2003 2005 →

The 2004 Formula BMW ADAC season was a multi-event motor racing championship for open wheel, formula racing cars held across Europe. The championship featured drivers competing in 1.2 litre Formula BMW single seat race cars. The 2004 season was the seventh Formula BMW ADAC season organized by BMW Motorsport and ADAC. The season began at Hockenheimring on 17 April and finished at the same place on 3 October, after twenty races.

Sebastian Vettel dominated the championship winning 18 of the 20 races, on his way to championship title.

== Driver lineup ==
Team	No.	Driver	Class	Rounds
(Germany) ADAC Berlin-Brandenburg e.V.	2	(Colombia) Federico Montoya		All
(Germany) ADAC Berlin-Brandenburg e.V.	3	(United Kingdom) Dominik Jackson		All
(Germany) ADAC Berlin-Brandenburg e.V.	4	(Italy) Fabio Onidi	R	All
(Germany) ADAC Berlin-Brandenburg e.V.	11	(Germany) Sebastian Vettel		All
(Germany) Eifelland Racing	5	(Brazil) Átila Abreu		All
(Germany) Eifelland Racing	6	(Austria) Christopher Wasserman		All
(Germany) Team Rosberg	7	(New Zealand) Chris van der Drift	R	All
(Germany) Team Rosberg	8	(Czech Republic) Jan Charouz		All
(Germany) Team Rosberg	9	(Germany) Marcel Jeleniowski	R	All
(Germany) KUG/DEWALT RACING	10	(Germany) René Rast		1
(Germany) KUG/DEWALT RACING	12	(Estonia) Sten Pentus		1–9
(Germany) KUG/DEWALT RACING	13	(Czech Republic) Michael Vorba		All
(Germany) KUG/DEWALT RACING	14	(Germany) Andreas Ciecior		1–8
(Germany) KUG/DEWALT RACING	35	(United Kingdom) Ross Curnow		10
(Germany) Team Lauderbach Motorsport	10	(Germany) René Rast		5–10
(Germany) Team Lauderbach Motorsport	22	(Germany) Michael Niemas		1–4
(Germany) Team Lauderbach Motorsport	23	(Germany) André Pablo Sander	R	All
(Austria) HBR Motorsport GmbH	15	(Germany) Mario Josten		All
(Austria) HBR Motorsport GmbH	16	(Austria) Dominic Tiroch		1–9
(Austria) HBR Motorsport GmbH	36	(United States) Jonathan Summerton		10
(Germany) Josef Kaufmann Racing	17	(South Africa) Adrian Zaugg	R	All
(Germany) Josef Kaufmann Racing	18	(Germany) Benjamin Leuchter	R	All
(Germany) Lars Kaufmann Motorsport	19	(Switzerland) Sébastien Buemi	R	All
(Germany) Mamerow Racing	20	(Germany) Tim Sandtler	R	All
Privateer	21	(Germany) Martin Hippe		All
Privateer	29	(Germany) Hanno Hess		1
(Germany) AM-Holzer Rennsport GmbH	24	(Germany) Marco Holzer	R	All
(Germany) AM-Holzer Rennsport GmbH	25	(Switzerland) Natacha Gachnang		All
(Finland) Matson Motorsport	26	(Finland) Henri Karjalainen	R	All
(Germany) 4speed Media	27	(Germany) Dominik Wasem	R	All
(Germany) 4speed Media	28	(Germany) Michael Woller	R	1–4, 6–7, 9
(Czech Republic) Czech National Team	30	(Czech Republic) Jiri Micanek		4–10

Icon	Class
R	Rookie Cup

== 2004 Schedule ==
The series supported the Deutsche Tourenwagen Masters at nine rounds, with additional round at the European Grand Prix on 29–30 May.

Round		Location	Circuit	Date
1	R1	Hockenheim, Germany	Hockenheimring	17 April
1	R2	Hockenheim, Germany	Hockenheimring	18 April
2	R1	Adria, Italy	Adria International Raceway	15 May
2	R2	Adria, Italy	Adria International Raceway	16 May
3	R1	Nürburg, Germany	Nürburgring	29 May
3	R2	Nürburg, Germany	Nürburgring	30 May
4	R1	Klettwitz, Germany	EuroSpeedway Lausitz	5 June
4	R2	Klettwitz, Germany	EuroSpeedway Lausitz	6 June
5	R1	Nuremberg, Germany	Norisring	26 June
5	R2	Nuremberg, Germany	Norisring	27 June
6	R1	Nürburg, Germany	Nürburgring	31 July
6	R2	Nürburg, Germany	Nürburgring	1 August
7	R1	Oschersleben, Germany	Motorsport Arena Oschersleben	7 August
7	R2	Oschersleben, Germany	Motorsport Arena Oschersleben	8 August
8	R1	Zandvoort, Netherlands	Circuit Park Zandvoort	4 September
8	R2	Zandvoort, Netherlands	Circuit Park Zandvoort	5 September
9	R1	Brno, Czech Republic	Masaryk Circuit	18 September
9	R2	Brno, Czech Republic	Masaryk Circuit	19 September
10	R1	Hockenheim, Germany	Hockenheimring	2 October
10	R2	Hockenheim, Germany	Hockenheimring	3 October

== Results ==
Round		Circuit	Pole position	Fastest lap	Winning driver	Winning team	Rookie winner
1	R1	(Germany) Hockenheimring	(Germany) Sebastian Vettel	(Germany) Sebastian Vettel	(Germany) Sebastian Vettel	(Germany) ADAC Berlin-Brandenburg e.V.	(New Zealand) Chris van der Drift
1	R2	(Germany) Hockenheimring	(Germany) Sebastian Vettel	(Germany) Sebastian Vettel	(Germany) Sebastian Vettel	(Germany) ADAC Berlin-Brandenburg e.V.	(Switzerland) Sébastien Buemi
2	R1	(Italy) Adria International Raceway	(Germany) Sebastian Vettel	(Switzerland) Sébastien Buemi	(Brazil) Átila Abreu	(Germany) ADAC Berlin-Brandenburg e.V.	(Switzerland) Sébastien Buemi
2	R2	(Italy) Adria International Raceway	(Germany) Sebastian Vettel	(Germany) Sebastian Vettel	(Germany) Sebastian Vettel	(Germany) ADAC Berlin-Brandenburg e.V.	(Switzerland) Sébastien Buemi
3	R1	(Germany) Nürburgring	(Germany) Sebastian Vettel	(Germany) Sebastian Vettel	(Germany) Sebastian Vettel	(Germany) ADAC Berlin-Brandenburg e.V.	(New Zealand) Chris van der Drift
3	R2	(Germany) Nürburgring	(United Kingdom) Dominik Jackson	(United Kingdom) Dominik Jackson	(Brazil) Átila Abreu	(Germany) ADAC Berlin-Brandenburg e.V.	(New Zealand) Chris van der Drift
4	R1	(Germany) EuroSpeedway Lausitz	(Germany) Sebastian Vettel	(Germany) Sebastian Vettel	(Germany) Sebastian Vettel	(Germany) ADAC Berlin-Brandenburg e.V.	(Switzerland) Sébastien Buemi
4	R2	(Germany) EuroSpeedway Lausitz	(Switzerland) Sébastien Buemi	(Germany) Sebastian Vettel	(Germany) Sebastian Vettel	(Germany) ADAC Berlin-Brandenburg e.V.	(Switzerland) Sébastien Buemi
5	R1	(Germany) Norisring	(Germany) Sebastian Vettel	(Germany) Sebastian Vettel	(Germany) Sebastian Vettel	(Germany) ADAC Berlin-Brandenburg e.V.	(New Zealand) Chris van der Drift
5	R2	(Germany) Norisring	(Switzerland) Sébastien Buemi	(Brazil) Átila Abreu	(Germany) Sebastian Vettel	(Germany) ADAC Berlin-Brandenburg e.V.	(New Zealand) Chris van der Drift
6	R1	(Germany) Nürburgring	(Germany) Sebastian Vettel	(Germany) Sebastian Vettel	(Germany) Sebastian Vettel	(Germany) ADAC Berlin-Brandenburg e.V.	(Switzerland) Sébastien Buemi
6	R2	(Germany) Nürburgring	(Germany) Sebastian Vettel	(Germany) Sebastian Vettel	(Germany) Sebastian Vettel	(Germany) ADAC Berlin-Brandenburg e.V.	(South Africa) Adrian Zaugg
7	R1	(Germany) Motorsport Arena Oschersleben	(Germany) Sebastian Vettel	(Germany) Sebastian Vettel	(Germany) Sebastian Vettel	(Germany) ADAC Berlin-Brandenburg e.V.	(Switzerland) Sébastien Buemi
7	R2	(Germany) Motorsport Arena Oschersleben	(Germany) Sebastian Vettel	(Germany) Sebastian Vettel	(Germany) Sebastian Vettel	(Germany) ADAC Berlin-Brandenburg e.V.	(New Zealand) Chris van der Drift
8	R1	(Netherlands) Circuit Park Zandvoort	(Germany) Sebastian Vettel	(Brazil) Átila Abreu	(Germany) Sebastian Vettel	(Germany) ADAC Berlin-Brandenburg e.V.	(Switzerland) Sébastien Buemi
8	R2	(Netherlands) Circuit Park Zandvoort	(Germany) Sebastian Vettel	(Germany) Sebastian Vettel	(Germany) Sebastian Vettel	(Germany) ADAC Berlin-Brandenburg e.V.	(Germany) Marcel Jeleniowski
9	R1	(Czech Republic) Masaryk Circuit	(Italy) Fabio Onidi	(Germany) Sebastian Vettel	(Germany) Sebastian Vettel	(Germany) ADAC Berlin-Brandenburg e.V.	(Switzerland) Sébastien Buemi
9	R2	(Czech Republic) Masaryk Circuit	(Germany) Sebastian Vettel	(Germany) Sebastian Vettel	(Germany) Sebastian Vettel	(Germany) ADAC Berlin-Brandenburg e.V.	(New Zealand) Chris van der Drift
10	R1	(Germany) Hockenheimring	(Brazil) Átila Abreu	(Germany) Sebastian Vettel	(Germany) Sebastian Vettel	(Germany) ADAC Berlin-Brandenburg e.V.	(Switzerland) Sébastien Buemi
10	R2	(Germany) Hockenheimring	(Germany) Sebastian Vettel	(Switzerland) Sébastien Buemi	(Germany) Sebastian Vettel	(Germany) ADAC Berlin-Brandenburg e.V.	(New Zealand) Chris van der Drift

== Standings ==
- Points are awarded as follows:

1	2	3	4	5	6	7	8	9	10
20	15	12	10	8	6	4	3	2	1

Pos	Driver	HOC1 (Germany)		ADR (Italy)		NÜR1 (Germany)		LAU (Germany)		NOR (Germany)		NÜR2 (Germany)		OSC (Germany)		ZAN (Netherlands)		BRN (Czech Republic)		HOC2 (Germany)		Pts
1	(Germany) Sebastian Vettel	**1**	**1**	**2**	**1**	**1**	3	**1**	1	**1**	1	**1**	**1**	**1**	**1**	**1**	**1**	1	**1**	1	**1**	387
2	(Brazil) Átila Abreu	7	4	1	2	2	1	2	3	2	2	2	2	3	2	2	2	2	25†	**4**	4	263
3	(Switzerland) Sébastien Buemi	4	2	3	4	6	5	3	**2**	DSQ	**21**	6	6	2	Ret	3	4	3	3	2	3	188
4	(New Zealand) Chris van der Drift	3	3	7	6	4	4	6	DSQ	3	3	9	8	5	3	8	5	6	2	3	2	168
5	(United Kingdom) Dominik Jackson	2	5	5	5	3	**2**	5	6	8	6	7	14	8	Ret	9	14	8	7	Ret	7	109
6	(Austria) Christopher Wassermann	8	Ret	6	Ret	8	8	10	Ret	4	4	3	3	4	20†	5	21	5	24†	6	12	92
7	(South Africa) Adrian Zaugg	11	6	19	14	5	22	8	10	Ret	Ret	14	5	6	Ret	6	7	9	8	5	Ret	55
8	(Italy) Fabio Onidi	Ret	17	9	7	11	9	7	Ret	15	9	16	10	Ret	4	17	6	**4**	4	13	8	54
9	(Germany) Mario Josten	6	23†	DSQ	3	Ret	6	11	8	7	5	11	Ret	17	5	13	10	14	10	8	Ret	52
10	(Czech Republic) Michael Vorba	5	Ret	8	12	Ret	7	23†	5	6	22†	8	9	7	10	7	9	Ret	18	Ret	16	45
11	(Germany) Martin Hippe	Ret	8	14	10	7	12	4	4	5	12	13	16	10	21†	10	18	Ret	13	Ret	Ret	38
12	(Switzerland) Natacha Gachnang	12	11	11	11	Ret	DNS	9	7	14	13	4	4	11	7	23	12	10	6	Ret	11	37
13	(Germany) Marcel Jeleniowski	13	13	21	18	14	13	24†	16	16	10	15	22	22	9	4	3	7	20	7	9	35
14	(Colombia) Federico Montoya	9	14	25†	16	9	10	Ret	12	Ret	15	Ret	20	9	6	11	16	16	8	Ret	6	27
15	(Austria) Dominik Tiroch	16	Ret	4	8	Ret	17	Ret	14	9	7	21	13	13	NC	15	15	15	16			19
16	(Germany) Andreas Ciecior	Ret	7	16	9	12	11	13	13	11	Ret	5	7	19	19†	14	Ret					18
17	(Germany) Tim Sandtler	15	12	18	Ret	19	16	15	Ret	Ret	14	18	15	16	8	22†	8	11	9	Ret	5	16
18	(Estonia) Sten Pentus	14	15	10	19	13	19	17	12	12	8	20	17	21	14	19	20	Ret	17			4
19	(Germany) Benjamin Leuchter	17	16	22	15	15	15	12	9	17	16	12	19	23	12	16	19	Ret	14	9	13	4
20	(Germany) Marco Holzer	20	10	12	17	10	14	16	11	10	Ret	22	Ret	14	DNS	12	13	17	12	Ret	10	4
21	(Czech Republic) Jan Charouz	10	9	13	13	20†	Ret	14	15	13	11	26	12	24	11	Ret	Ret	12	11	12	Ret	3
22	(Germany) René Rast	Ret	Ret							DNS	Ret	17	18	12	Ret	Ret	11	13	15	10	14	1
23	(Germany) André Pablo Sander	18	18	15	Ret	21†	18	18	17	21	17	10	11	15	18	DSQ	DNS	20	22	11	Ret	1
24	(Finland) Henri Karjalainen	19	20	17	21	16	20	19	20	19	20	24	21	Ret	13	21	22	19	23	16	Ret	0
25	(United States) Jonathan Summerton																			14	15	0
26	(Germany) Dominik Wasem	21	19	20	20	17	21	Ret	Ret	18	19	25	23	18	15	18	17	22	21	15	17	0
27	(Czech Republic) Jiri Micanek							20	19	20	18	23	24	20	16	20	Ret	18	19	NC	Ret	0
28	(Germany) Michael Woller	23	22	23	22	18	23	22	18			19	Ret	25	17			21	Ret			0
29	(United Kingdom) Ross Curnow																			17	18	0
30	(Germany) Michael Niemas	22	21	24	Ret	Ret	24	21	Ret													0
	(Germany) Hanno Hess	DSQ	DNS																			0
Pos	Driver	HOC1 (Germany)		ADR (Italy)		NÜR1 (Germany)		LAU (Germany)		NOR (Germany)		NÜR2 (Germany)		OSC (Germany)		ZAN (Netherlands)		BRN (Czech Republic)		HOC2 (Germany)		Pts

Colour	Result
Gold	Winner
Silver	Second place
Bronze	Third place
Green	Points classification
Blue	Non-points classification
Blue	Non-classified finish (NC)
Purple	Retired, not classified (Ret)
Red	Did not qualify (DNQ)
Red	Did not pre-qualify (DNPQ)
Black	Disqualified (DSQ)
White	Did not start (DNS)
White	Withdrew (WD)
White	Race cancelled (C)
Blank	Did not practice (DNP)
Blank	Did not arrive (DNA)
Blank	Excluded (EX)

**Bold** – Pole
Italics – Fastest Lap

† — Drivers did not finish the race, but were classified as they completed over 90% of the race distance.
