= Radical European Masters =

- Category: Radical Sportscars
- Country: Europe
- Inaugural season: 2008
- Constructors: (United Kingdom) Radical Sportscars
- Tyre suppliers: (United Kingdom) Dunlop

The Radical European Masters, or REM for short, is a one make sports cars motor racing series launched in 2008.

== Radical European Masters cars ==
There are two classes in the European Masters, the main class featuring Radical SR8 and Radical RXC Spyders. There is also a supersport class for the Radical SR3. The SR8 has a 2.7L RPE V8 Engine producing 411 hp with a weight of 725 kg and the RXC Spyder has a Twin turbo 3.5L Ecoboost engine producing 654 hp with a weight of 1010 kg, with the SR3 featuring a tuned and stroked 1.5L Hayabusa engine producing 226 hp with a weight of 620 kg.

== Race weekend ==
The REM Series in 2008 and 2009 took place during Le Mans Series race weekends. In 2010 Radical Motorsport Deutschland ran the Radical European Masters as an improved racing series. Shell Racing Solutions have joined the Radical European Masters as title sponsor, and has been working closely with Radical to supply the latest racing fuels and lubricants. Primary technical partner Intrax has also attended all European Masters rounds providing technical support, shock absorber dyno services and suspension setup assistance to all competitors. The 2010 Radical European Masters will be known as 2010 Shell Racing Solutions Radical European Masters – In Association With Intrax. Start 2012 Radical European Masters has changed to FIA Radical Masters Euroseries.

The Championship currently supports the International GT Open Series visiting many of Europe's finest circuits such as Silverstone, Spa and Monza.

== Champions ==
Season	Champion
2008	(Italy) Francesco Sini
2009	(United Kingdom) Alex Kapadia / (Republic of Ireland) Jeff Collier
2011	Mark Smithson / Stuart Moseley
2012	(Latvia) Konstantīns Calko
2013	(Brazil) Victor Corrêa
2014	(United Kingdom) Bradley Smith
2015	(United Kingdom) Ross Kaiser
