= Thomas Hudson Turner =

English archaeologist and architectural historian

Thomas Hudson Turner (1815–1852) was an English archaeologist and architectural historian, born in London of Northumbrian extraction. He was educated at Mr Law's school in Chelsea and then apprenticed as a printer. His great interest in literature and antiquities led to his appointment in the Record office of the Tower of London.

He is best remembered for his work Some Account of Domestic Architecture in England: from the Conquest to the End of the Thirteenth Century published in Oxford/London in 1851 and completed by John Henry Parker after his death.

He died prematurely aged just 37, his health having suffered as a result of his arduous studies, and was buried on the western side of Highgate Cemetery. His grave (plot no.4455) no longer has a headstone or readable memorial.
