= John Lewis (pitcher) =

American baseball player

- Pitcher

Negro league baseball debut
- 1945, for the Homestead Grays

Last appearance
- 1945, for the Homestead Grays

MLB statistics
- Earned run average: 3.38
- Strikeouts: 3
- Innings pitched: 2.2
- Saves: 1
- Stats at Baseball Reference

Teams
- Homestead Grays (1945)

Career highlights and awards
- NNL saves leader (1945)

John Lewis was an American Negro league pitcher who played in 1945.

Lewis played one game for the Homestead Grays of the second Negro National League in 1945. He would come out of the game with a save, which tied him with fourteen other players of the NNL as save leaders of the 1945 season.
