= John Johnson (theologian) =

English clergyman

John Johnson, of Cranbrook (1662–1725) was an English clergyman, known as a theologian in the Laudian tradition.

== Life ==
Born 30 December 1662, at Frindsbury in Kent, he was son of the vicar, Thomas Johnson, by Mary, daughter of Francis Drayton, rector of Little Chart, Kent. His father died about four years after his marriage, and Mrs. Johnson, with her two children, a son and a daughter, settled at Canterbury, where John was sent to the King's School. At the age of 15 he went to Magdalene College, Cambridge, where he graduated B.A. 1681. He was afterwards nominated to a scholarship at Corpus Christi College by the dean and chapter of Canterbury; proceeded M.A. in 1685; received holy orders, and served the curacy of Hardres, near Canterbury.

In 1687 he was collated by Archbishop William Sancroft to the vicarage of Boughton-under-the-Blean, and he also held the neighbouring vicarage of Hernhill, which was under sequestration. In 1697 the vicarage of St. John's, which included Margate, became void, and Archbishop Thomas Tenison appointed Johnson to the benefice. As the salary was small, he also collated Johnson to the vicarage of Appledore, on the borders of Romney Marsh, on 1 May 1697. Johnson took two or three boarders to teach with his two sons, and growing absorbed in the work of education, he resigned his clerical charge, and settled at Appledore in 1703. The air not agreeing with him, he obtained from Tenison the living of Cranbrook, Kent, which fell vacant in 1707. There he remained until his death and wrote most of his books. He is generally known as ‘Johnson of Cranbrook.’

He was chosen in 1710 and 1713 by the clergy of the diocese of Canterbury to be one of their proctors in convocation. He was a diligent parish priest, and always held daily service in his church. His church principles were those of the nonjurors, and he was intimate with Dr. George Hickes. Among his correspondence are letters from Hickes and Robert Nelson, and to Thomas Brett.

He never recovered from the death of his eldest son in December 1723. He died 15 December 1725, and was buried in Cranbrook churchyard. In 1689 he married Margaret, daughter of Thomas Jenkin, by whom he had five children, only one of whom survived him.

== Works ==
Most of his books were anonymous. His first was a paraphrase, with notes, of the Book of Psalms, according to the translation in the Book of Common Prayer, called ‘Holy David and his Old English Translation cleared’ (1706). His next work, ‘The Clergyman's Vade Mecum’ (first part in 1708 reached a fifth edition in 1723. In 1709 he published part ii. of the ‘Vade Mecum,’ containing ‘the Canonical Codes of the Primitive, Universal, Eastern, and Western Church down to the year 787,’ with explanatory notes. In 1710 appeared ‘The Propitiatory Oblation in the Holy Eucharist,’ with a postscript replying to some remarks by Charles Trimnell, bishop of Norwich on the second part of the ‘Vade Mecum.’ This work, which was in direct opposition to the Whig theology of the day, alienated Thomas Tenison and provoked many replies.

In 1714 Johnson gave further expression to his views in his major work, ‘The Unbloody Sacrifice and Altar Unvail'd and Supported.’ In 1717 he published part ii. of ‘The Unbloody Sacrifice.’ Both parts were reissued in the Anglo-Catholic Library in 1847. Next followed a collection of ecclesiastical laws, 1720 (new ed. 1850), and some tracts on practical subjects.

After his death his daughters published ‘The Primitive Communicant,’ in three discourses, ‘Daniel's Prophecy of the LXX Weeks explained,’ and two sermons on ‘The Nature of God and His True Worship.’ These, with a sermon preached at Canterbury school-feast, with a preface contending that there were ‘no alphabetical letters before Moses,’ are contained in one volume, with a life of the author by Thomas Brett, published in 1748. Two volumes of sermons were published in 1728. A paper by Johnson on the office of an archdeacon was printed in ‘Illustrations of the Manners and Experiences of Antient Times in England,’ by [J. N.], 1797.
