= John Lewis (computer scientist) =

American computer scientist

John Alan Lewis (born 25 August 1963) is an American computer science educator, and the owner of a Twitter account that is frequently mistaken for that of the British department store or the American politician and civil rights leader.

== Computer science ==
Formerly of Villanova University and the New York Institute of Technology, Lewis is an adjunct professor at Virginia Tech. He is one of the coauthors of Java Software Solutions, an introductory text on Java programming.

== Social media ==
Popularly, Lewis is known for being the owner of the Twitter account '@johnlewis', to which hundreds of users from across the world mistakenly send tweets intended for the British department store John Lewis or the American politician and civil rights leader John Lewis. He has been described as "the most patient man on the internet" by British social media users for redirecting with humour mistaken requests and messages sent to him, especially around the Christmas shopping period. The department store sent Lewis a gift set as an acknowledgment and a thank you in 2016 for the inconvenience caused to him. In 2018, Lewis was featured in a Twitter Christmas ad with the hashtag #NotARetailStore.
