= Red Devil Energy Drink =

Energy drink

Red Devil
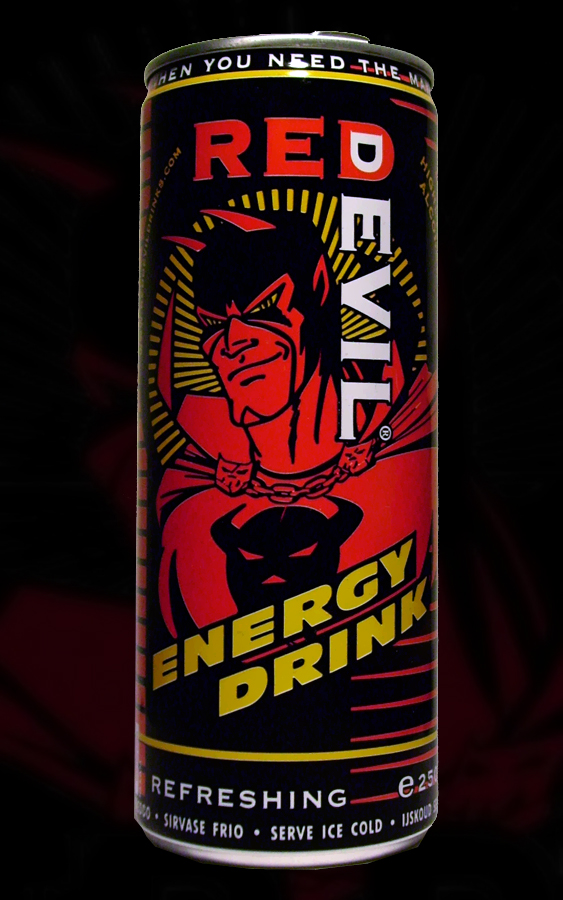
- Type: Energy drink
- Manufacturer: Britvic
- Origin: Netherlands
- Introduced: 1995
- Website: www.reddevildrinks.com

Red Devil Energy Drink is a premium energy drink brand that was formulated in Netherlands in 1995. The UK and Irish licence was purchased from entrepreneur Clive Garrad in 2002 by Britvic. Britvic transferred the production from Holland to Chelmsford, but withdrew the brand in 2011.

== Marketing ==
Red Devil has an aggressive marketing strategy throughout the world. Their slogan is "The Taste of Energy" is translated into many languages in numerous countries. Red Devil mainly focuses on sponsoring many forms of racing including World Rally Championship, F1 Powerboat World Championship, drag racing, and various other types of open wheel, touring car, motorcycle, and stock car racing.

== In Europe ==
Red Devil originally was produced in a 12oz glass bottle and eventually made its way into a 12oz can. The company also produces Red Devil Light and even begun making Red Devil Energy Gum. The company's huge success in Europe is credited with their massive marketing campaign with successful racing teams.

Like its competitor Red Bull, Red Devil is now sold primarily in 250ml slim cans in the UK. The Drink is popularly mixed with vodka in bars and clubs. It's also now available in large cans of 440ml (in certain shops) and in 500ml in Finland.

== Expansion ==
In late 2007, Red Devil formed a strategic partnership with Impulse One and started their expansion into the United States. They formulated a new version of Red Devil specifically for the U.S. market in a 16oz can which is a bit more sweet and has more of a berry-like taste. Along with the original flavor of the drink, they have also released a Red Devil Light, their sugar free U.S. version.

Red Devil Racing sponsored HL Motorsports, an ARCA race team. In August 2008, Red Devil was released in Australia although at the moment is only available in limited areas. In June 2010, Red Devil was released in Norway, in test- and pre-sales at the moment only available at 7-11 and MIX. The major release is estimated to January 2011.
