= Sophia Flörsch =

German racing driver (born 2000)

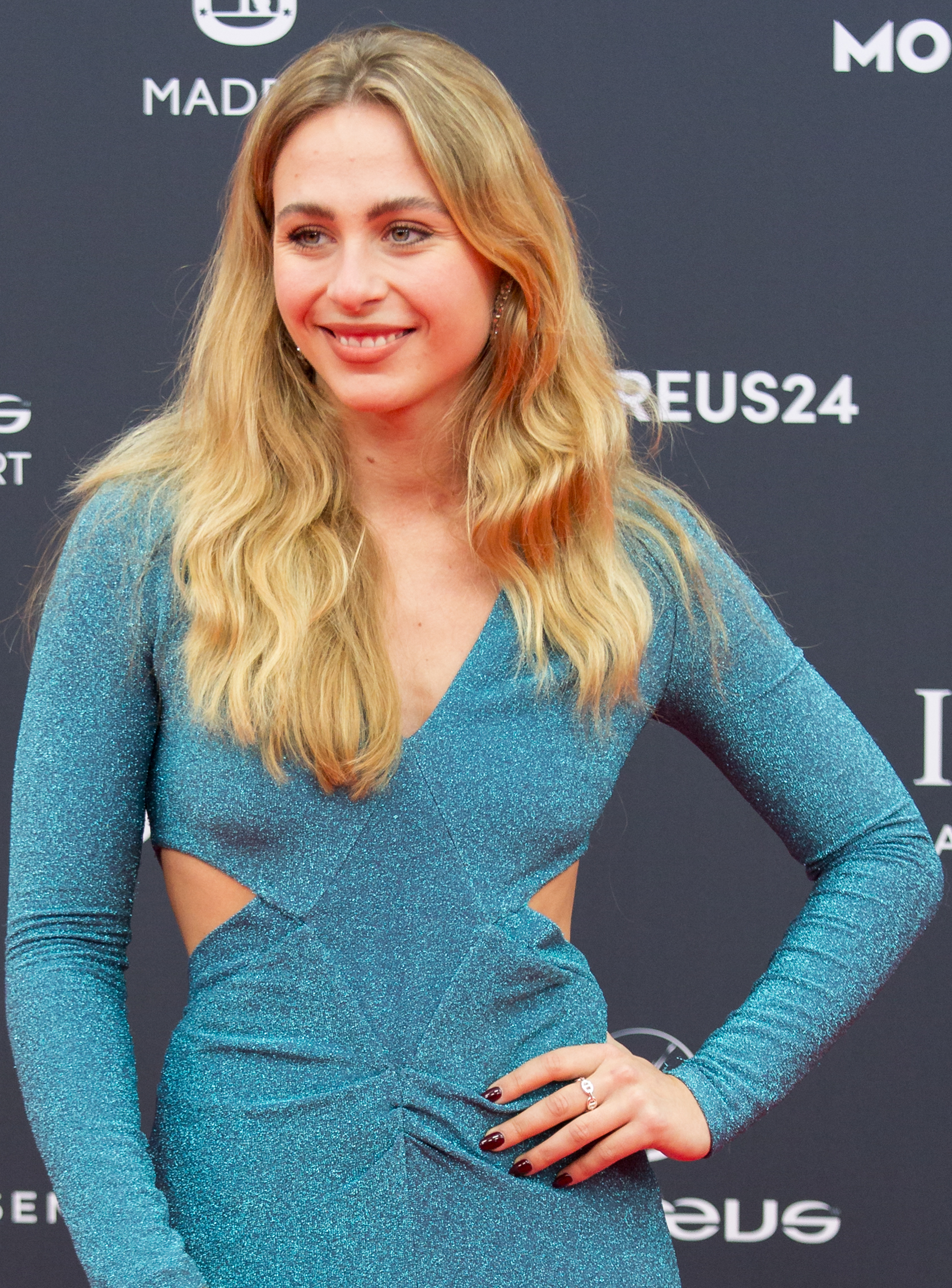
- Flörsch in 2024
- Nationality: (Germany) German
- Born: 1 December 2000 (age 25) Grünwald, Germany

Indy NXT career
- Debut season: 2025
- Current team: HMD Motorsports
- Categorisation: FIA Silver
- Car number: 24
- Starts: 1 (1 entries)
- Wins: 0
- Podiums: 0
- Poles: 0
- Fastest laps: 0

European Le Mans Series career
- Debut season: 2020
- Current team: Algarve Pro Racing
- Car number: 19
- Former teams: Richard Mille Racing Team
- Starts: 8
- Wins: 0
- Podiums: 2
- Poles: 0
- Fastest laps: 0
- Best finish: 13th in 2022

24 Hours of Le Mans career
- Years: 2020–
- Teams: Richard Mille Racing Team, Algarve Pro Racing
- Best finish: 5th (2022) in LMP2 Pro-Am

Previous series
- 2020, 2023–2024 2021 2021 2019 2018 2016–2017 2015: FIA Formula 3 Championship; FIA World Endurance Championship; Deutsche Tourenwagen Masters; FR European Championship; FIA F3 European Championship; ADAC Formula 4 Ginetta Junior Championship

Awards
- 2020: Laureus World Sports Award for Comeback of the Year

Sophia Flörsch (German pronunciation: [zoˈfiːa flœʁʃ]; born 1 December 2000) is a German racing driver who serves as a development driver for Opel in Formula E. She previously raced in Formula 3, DTM, FIA WEC and is a podium finisher in ADAC Formula 4 and the ELMS, as well as the youngest race winner of the Ginetta Junior Championship. From 2023 to 2024, she was part of the Alpine Academy.

== Personal life ==
Flörsch was born in Grünwald, Bavaria, and has spent most of her life around Munich: she attended Oberhaching Grammar School and is now based in Pullach. Her interests include karting, skiing and wind surfing. She has cited Lewis Hamilton, Sebastian Vettel and Michael Schumacher as her racing idols.

=== Views and ambassadorship ===
Flörsch was an outspoken critic of the now-defunct W Series women's Formula Regional championship; labelling it a "step back on a sporting level" and "not the way to help women in motorsport" upon launch in 2019, and "gender bashing" in 2022. She further criticised the existence of a series-affiliated esports championship held during the coronavirus pandemic, claiming it would create "segregation behind a computer". In 2024, after the championship's collapse, former W Series driver Abbie Eaton claimed that some of Flörsch's arguments were "completely deluded" and that "a lot of the time it's her dad posting on her social media". She has also been critical of the subsequent F1 Academy, classing it as "segregation" and "the wrong approach".

Flörsch is a brand ambassador for the Schaeffler Group, as well as non-profit organisations Dare to be Different and Wings for Life. She has twice been a guest at the International Motor Show Germany, and in February 2020 she won the award for World Comeback of the Year at the 2020 Laureus World Sports Awards.

== Racing career ==
=== Karting ===
Flörsch began karting in 2005. From 2008 to 2014, Flörsch competed in various karting events across Europe through Kart Sport. She became the first female driver and also youngest driver of three series she competed in, the 2008 SAKC Championship, 2009 ADAC German Championship and 2010 European Championship Easykart. She was also scouted by Red Bull.

=== Ginetta Junior ===
In 2015, Flörsch took part in the 2015 Ginetta Junior Championship season driving for HHC Motorsport. During the season, Flörsch collected two wins and a further two podiums. She made double Ginetta history at Thruxton by becoming the youngest driver to win a Ginetta Junior race, and also the first rookie to win two out of two races in one weekend. Her season was cut short due to financial issues and she finished at the mid-season point, at that time running in third in the championship, also leading the Rookie championship. Her car for the season was Car 14, which she named Paul.

=== Formula 4 ===
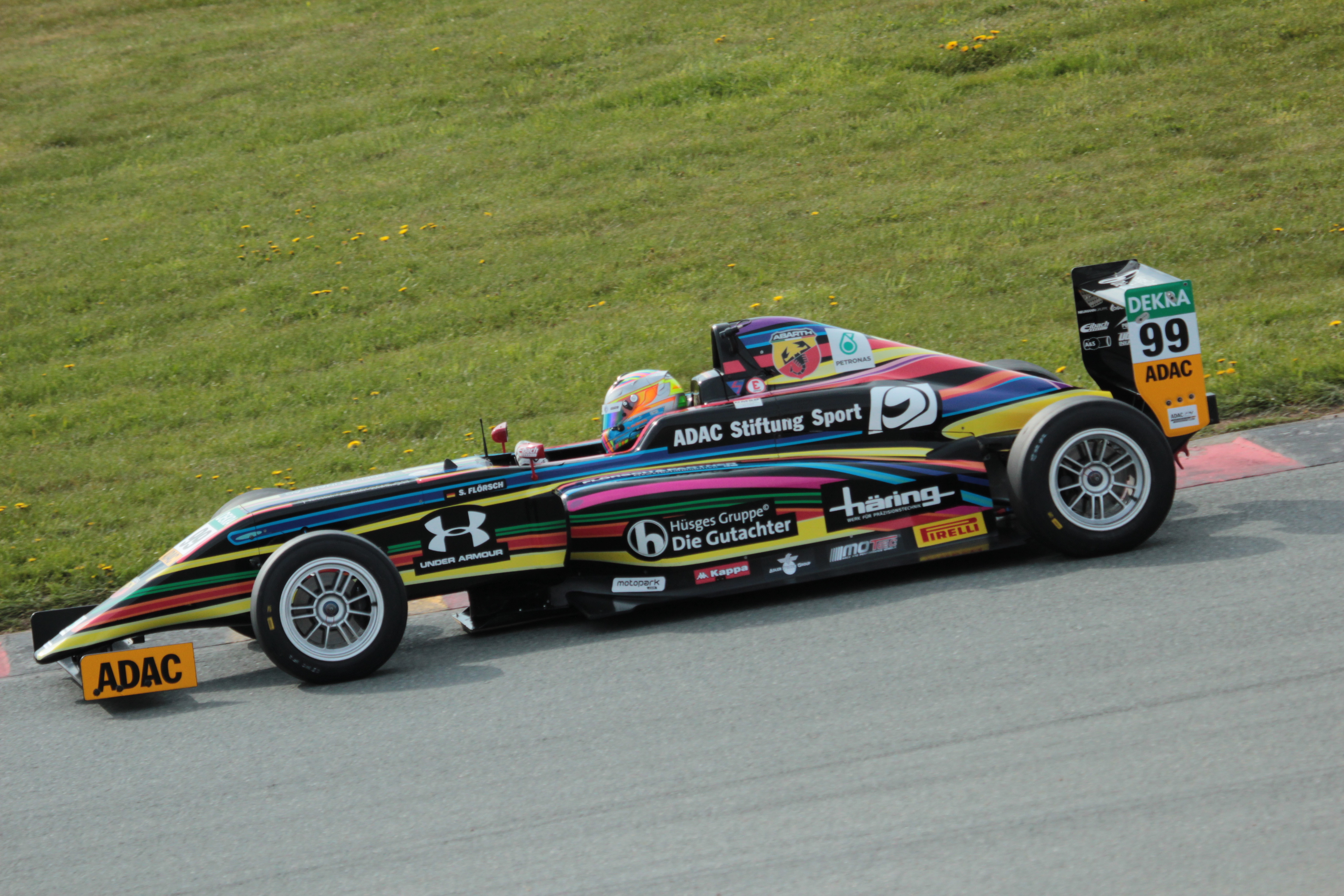
Flörsch racing at Sachsenring in ADAC Formula 4 in 2016.

In 2016, Flörsch signed with Motopark to drive in the ADAC Formula 4 championship. Her car for the season was Car #99, which she called Hugo. In her debut race, she became the first female to score points in an ADAC Formula 4 race. She almost achieved her first single-seater podium in only her third race; after being hit by another car in the closing laps of the race she recovered to fifth. Her first fastest lap of the season came at race 3 in Zandvoort, in a race halted by poor weather conditions.

The following year, Flörsch raced for ADAC Berlin-Brandenburg in a pink BWT-sponsored car. She got her first podium finish at the Sachsenring, a feat she repeated at Hockenheim, where she also took two fastest laps.

=== FIA Formula 3 European Championship ===
==== 2018 ====
On 13 March 2018, Flörsch participated in her first FIA Formula 3 European Championship test, driving a Van Amersfoort Racing car at Portimão. On 6 July 2018, it was announced that she would join Van Amersfoort Racing beginning with round four at Circuit Zandvoort a week later. After suffering a steering failure while running 7th at the Nürburgring, Flörsch scored her first point with 10th at the Red Bull Ring.

==== 2018 Macau Grand Prix ====
From 15 to 18 November 2018, Flörsch participated in the Formula 3 World Cup at the 2018 Macau Grand Prix. During the main race, on lap four, she made contact with fellow driver Jehan Daruvala, who was reportedly slowing for erroneously-displayed yellow flags on the straight between Mandarin Corner (Turn 2) and Lisboa Bend (Turn 3). This caused a front left suspension failure, catapulting her car into Lisboa Bend sideways at high speed, launching off Sho Tsuboi's car, through the catch fencing and smashing into a photographers' bunker, before landing back onto its wheels. Flörsch was reported as conscious post crash and was hospitalised along with Tsuboi, two photographers, and a marshal. She was later diagnosed with a spinal fracture, for which she underwent surgery lasting almost ten hours the following day — subsequently reported as successful with "no fear of paralysis" by VAR team owner and team principal, Frits van Amersfoort.

=== Formula Regional ===
On 14 December 2018, Van Amersfoort Racing confirmed that Flörsch would race for the team in the European F3 replacement series, Formula European Masters, in 2019. After this series folded before a round was contested, Flörsch and VAR switched to the Formula Regional European Championship for updated Formula 3 machinery. Having joined the championship just one week before the opening race, the team struggled throughout the season, but Flörsch managed seventh place in the standings with points in all 24 races and a fastest lap at the Red Bull Ring.

=== Formula 3 ===
==== 2019 Macau Grand Prix ====
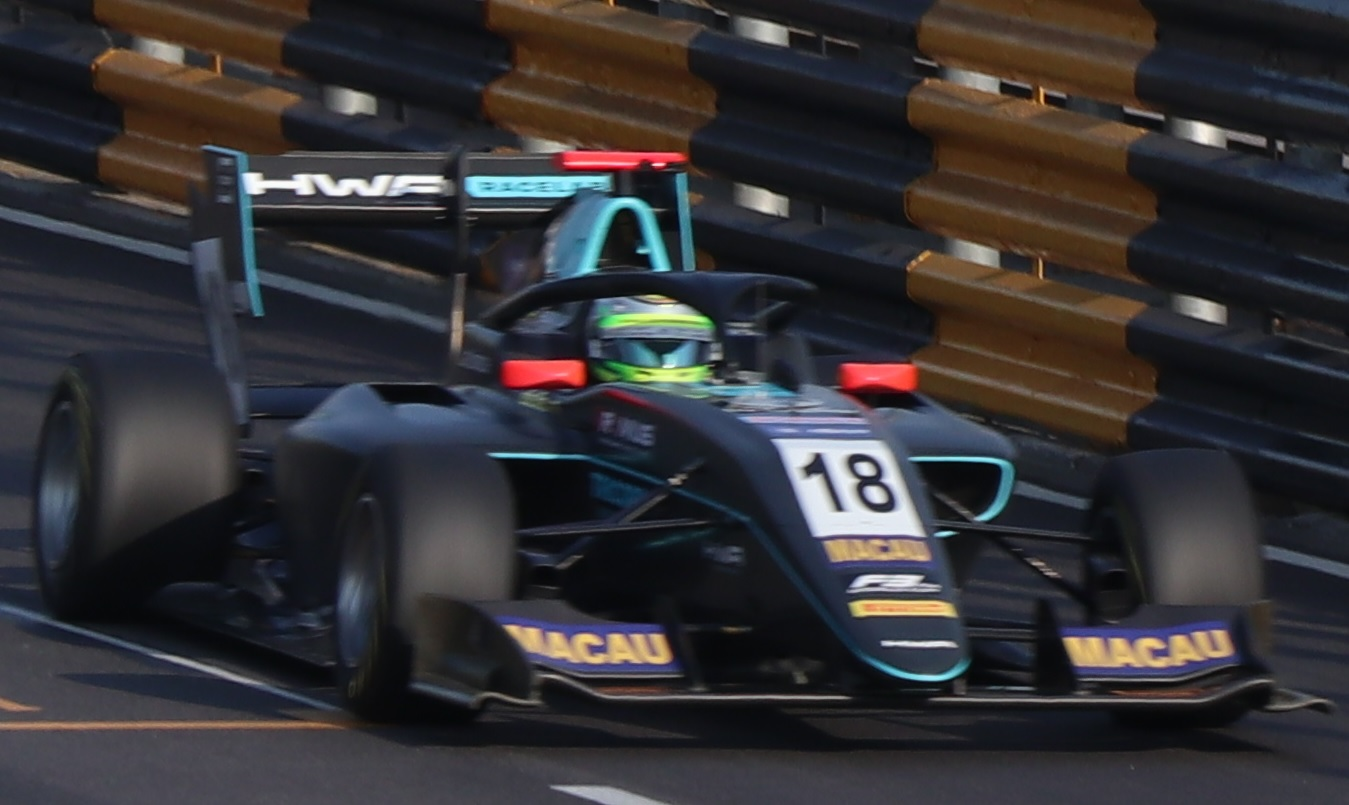
Flörsch at the 2019 Macau Grand Prix.

Flörsch was selected by the HWA Team to attend the FIA Formula 3 Championship post-season test on 22 October 2019 in Valencia. In early November, it was confirmed that Flörsch was placed on the team to compete in the 2019 Macau Grand Prix, with support from several Macanese companies and notable people. She failed to finish the race after her car suffered a mechanical failure which left her stranded ahead of the Mandarin Oriental Bend on the eighth lap.

==== 2020 ====
Flörsch signed with Campos Racing for the 2020 season of the FIA F3 Championship to partner Alessio Deledda and Alex Peroni. After a difficult year with several mechanical problems, she finished 29th out of 35 drivers in the standings, with a best finish of twelfth. She was the first woman to race in the championship since its formation after the GP3 Series and European F3 categories were merged.

==== 2023 ====
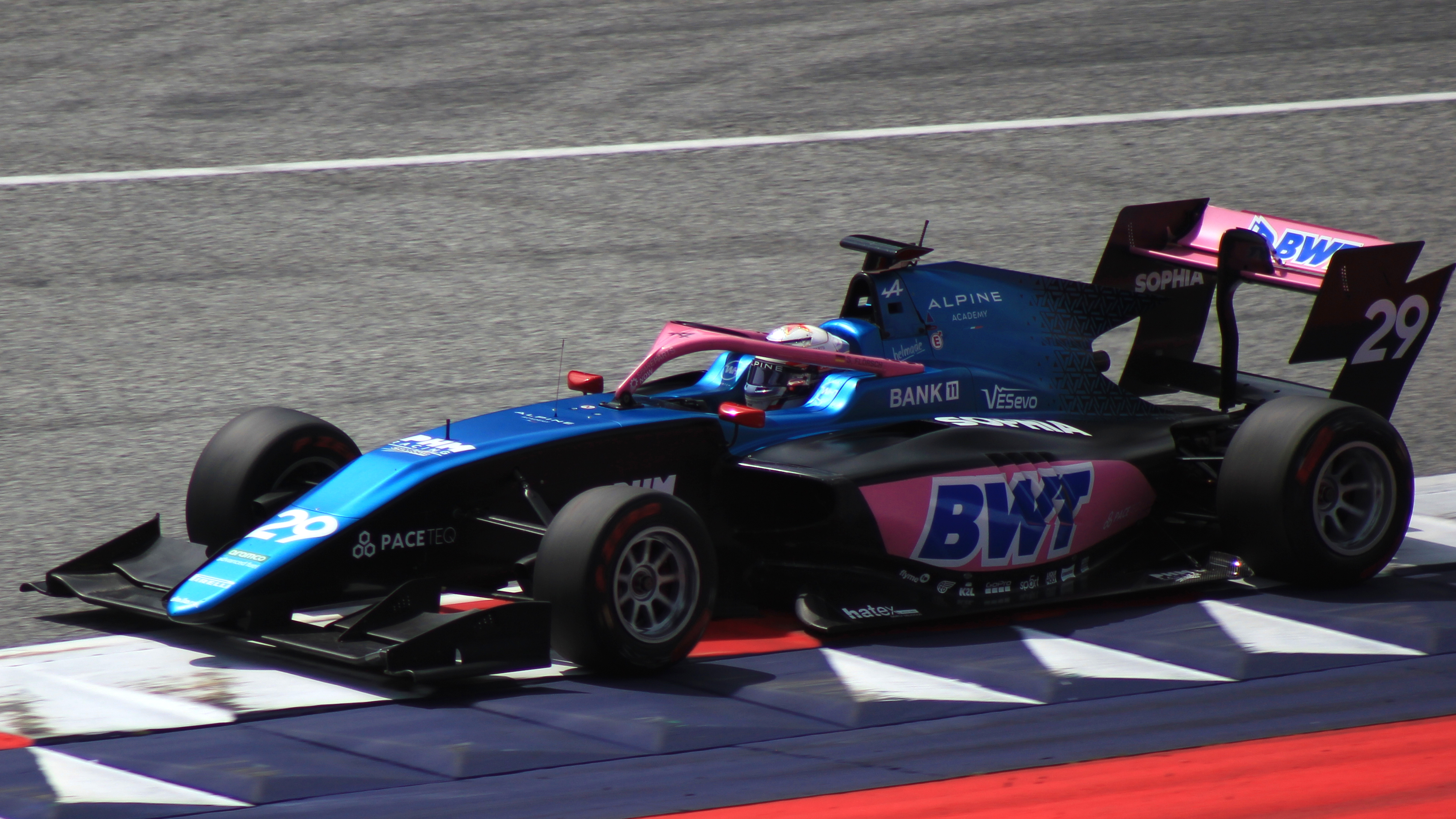
Flörsch driving for PHM Racing during the 2023 Spielberg Formula 3 round.

Flörsch returned to the FIA Formula 3 Championship in 2023, signing with PHM Racing by Charouz. Shortly after, she was announced as a new member of the Alpine Academy, having been selected by the brand's new Rac(H)er programme.

Having focused on collecting data in the first few rounds, Flörsch achieved her and PHM's first points after charging from 20th to 9th at the Red Bull Ring, only to then lose the result to a post-race disqualification. She then went on to make 23 and 29 overtakes respectively across both races at the Hungaroring and Spa-Francorchamps, before getting back into the points. With seventh place in a wet feature race at Spa, Flörsch earned six points—a milestone for women in motorsport, as she became the first female driver to score points in the series, and for the team, as Charouz had only managed a single point in the entire 2022 season.

===== 2023 Macau Grand Prix =====
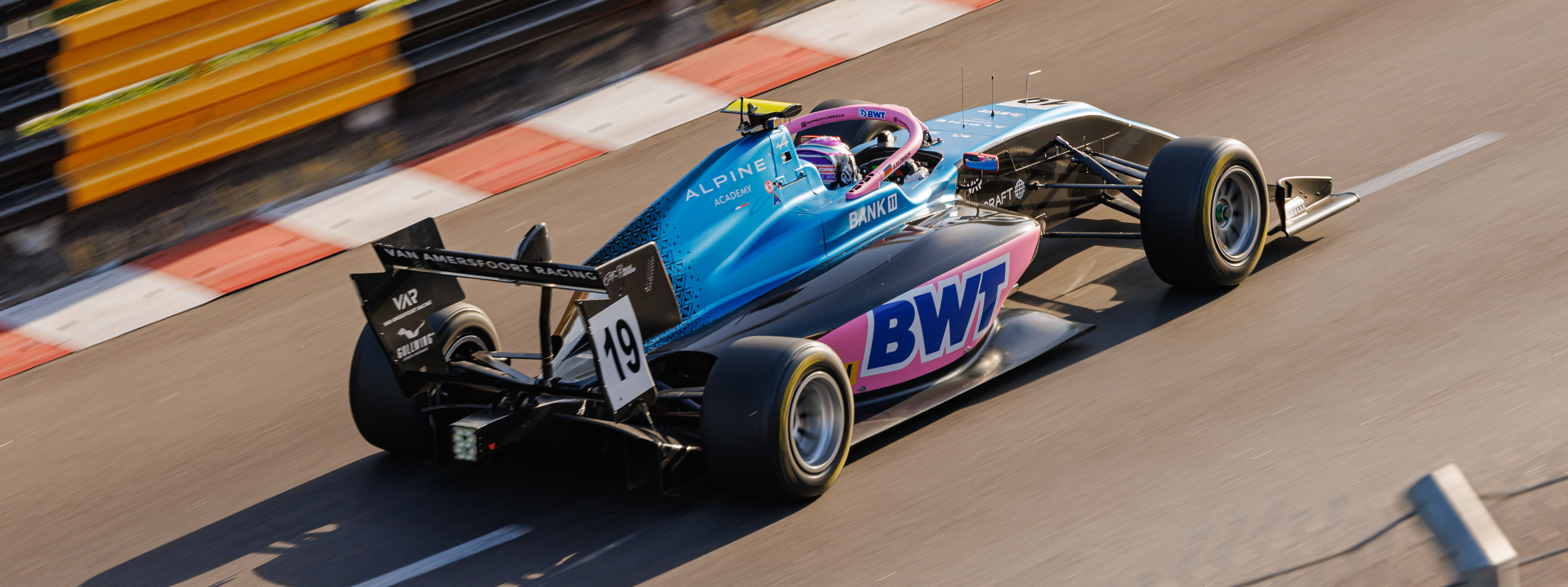
Flörsch racing at the 2023 Macau Grand Prix with Van Amersfoort Racing.

At the end of the 2023 season, Flörsch rejoined Van Amersfoort Racing to participate in the 2023 Macau Grand Prix. Unlike her previous two attempts, this time she was able to finish the race, in eleventh position ahead of both her teammates.

==== 2024 ====
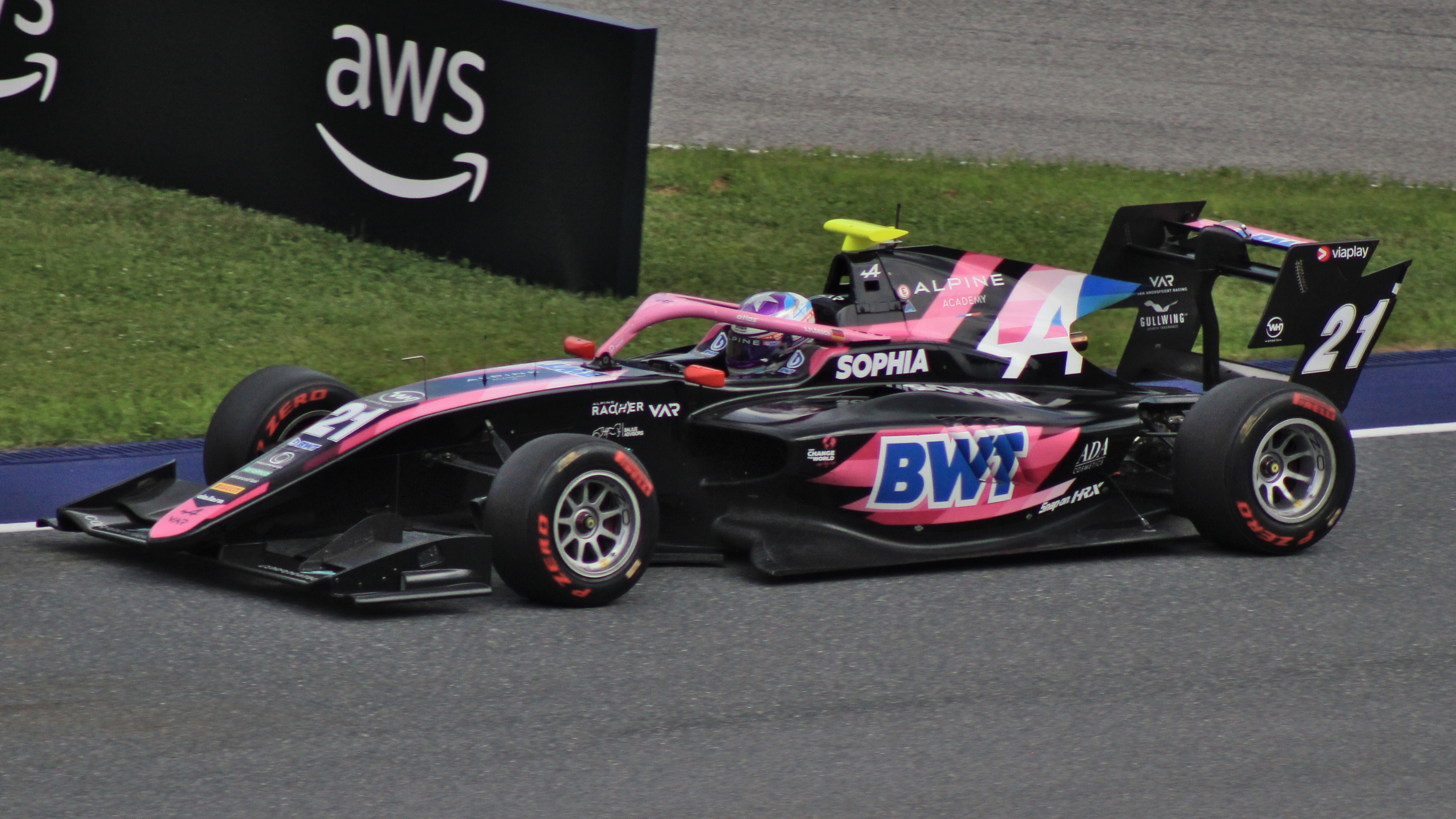
Flörsch's Alpine-liveried car at the 2024 Spielberg Formula 3 round.

Flörsch remained with Van Amersfoort Racing for the 2024 season, but failed to build on her previous year, recording a best finish of eleventh as teammate Noel León made the podium four times. VAR team manager Klaudija Jakaj stated after the season that Flörsch "would have deserved" to score points, and that she was "often involved in incidents caused by others".

=== Endurance racing ===
Flörsch combined her 2020 FIA Formula 3 Championship commitments with a debut in prototype racing, skipping the Spa-Francorchamps Formula 3 round to enter the Le Castellet 240 for Signatech's all-female Richard Mille Racing Team in the LMP2 class of the 2020 European Le Mans Series instead. The campaign also included entry into the 2020 24 Hours of Le Mans, where she finished in ninth place alongside Beitske Visser and Tatiana Calderón.

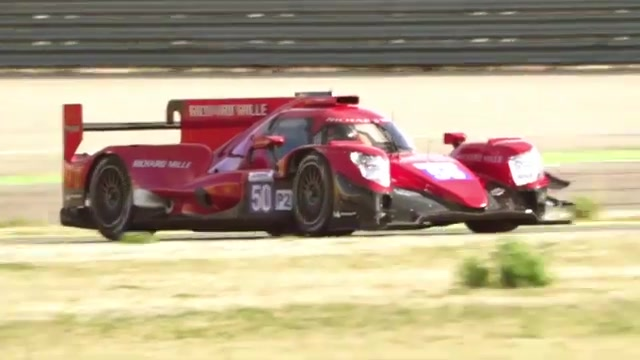
Flörsch testing Richard Mille's LMP2 at MotorLand Aragón in 2020.

Flörsch continued with Richard Mille in 2021, this time in the FIA World Endurance Championship, where she led the team to five points finishes and qualified a season-best sixth at the 8 Hours of Bahrain, ahead of Formula One race winner Juan Pablo Montoya. She also received a call-up from Algarve Pro Racing to replace Diego Menchaca in the 2021 European Le Mans Series season finale at Portimão. She finished third alongside Ferdinand Habsburg and Richard Bradley, achieving the team's first podium and becoming the first woman to finish on an overall ELMS podium since Natacha Gachnang in 2013. Flörsch later appeared in the post-season FIA World Endurance Championship rookie test in Bahrain, driving for newly-crowned LMP2 champions Team WRT, where she led both sessions.

Flörsch racing at the 2022 24 Hours of Le Mans for Algarve Pro Racing.

In 2022, Flörsch left the Richard Mille project to join G-Drive Racing and make a full-time return to the European Le Mans Series, driving one of the team's two Oreca 07 LMP2 cars alongside Roman Rusinov. The plan quickly changed following the team's withdrawal due to the Russian invasion of Ukraine. Algarve Pro Racing, who were set to run G-Drive's cars, took over independently, signing Flörsch and F2 podium finisher Bent Viscaal. Despite both being silver-ranked and lacking experience compared to the rival three-driver lineups, the pair took second place on debut at Paul Ricard. That was to be the high point of their season though, as a late puncture at Imola, an untimely full-course yellow at Monza and a pit-lane start at Barcelona limited their next results, before Flörsch vacated her seat for the final two rounds. She also entered the 24 Hours of Le Mans alongside Jack Aitken and bronze-rated John Falb, where bad fortune struck too. As the cars lined up for the start of the race, Flörsch's car came to a stop at the start-finish line with a sensor issue. She managed to restart it and crawl back to the pits, but the trio lost five laps and all podium aspirations while the crew fixed the problem. They climbed back up to fifth place in the LMP2 Pro/Am subclass, as Aitken set the eighth fastest LMP2 time and Flörsch was the third quickest silver driver.

After a two-year hiatus, Flörsch returned to the LMP2 paddocks in 2025, rejoining Algarve Pro Racing in a test and development role.

=== DTM ===
Alongside her FIA WEC programme, Flörsch raced in the 2021 Deutsche Tourenwagen Masters for German team Abt Sportsline with backing from Schaeffler. The first half of the season proved challenging, as she was the only Audi to pioneer Schaeffler's 'Space Drive' steer-by-wire system, but she turned it around by scoring eight points from the last six races, in what was her rookie season in GT3 cars.

=== Indy NXT ===
In December 2024, Flörsch signed with HMD Motorsports to compete in the 2025 Indy NXT series, shifting her career to United States–based racing. However, unexpected budget issues meant she had to end her season abruptly after just one race.

=== Formula E ===
In 2018, Flörsch was selected by HWA Racelab for December's in-season Formula E test in Diriyah, which saw nine women take to the Saudi track. However, the injuries sustained at Macau a month prior meant she was ultimately replaced by Carrie Schreiner. In 2024, Flörsch was scheduled to drive for Nissan at the women's test in Valencia, but was forced to withdraw after the event was disrupted by the 2024 Spanish floods — the new date at Madrid clashing with a "prior, unavoidable commitment".

In 2026, Flörsch joined the Opel GSE Formula E Team as test and development driver.

== Karting record ==
=== Karting career summary ===
Season	Series	Team	Position
2009	ADAC Kart Masters - Bambini B	Grünwald	5th
2009	Easykart Int. Grand Final - Easykart 60		30th
2009	ADAC Kart Bundesendlauf - Bambini B	Ebert Motorsport	1st
2010	Italian Open Masters - 60 Mini	Emilia Kart Srl	30th
2010	Easykart Int. Grand Final - Easykart 60	Emilia Kart	9th
2010	Easykart European Grand Finals - 60cc	Emilia Kart	1st
2010	40° Trofeo delle Industrie - 60 Mini	Emilia Kart	10th
2010	ADAC Kart Masters - Bambini A	Grünwald	15th
2010	WSK Nations Cup - 60 Mini		12th
2011	Andrea Margutti Trophy - 60 Mini	Birel Motorsport	6th
2011	Campionato Italiano CSAI Karting - 60 Mini		7th
2011	SKUSA Pro Tour - TaG Cadet		31st
2012	Euro Wintercup - KF3		22nd
2012	DMV Kart Championship - KF3	Ebert Motorsport	13th
2012	ADAC Kart Masters - KF3	Ebert Motorsport	13th
2012	Bridgestone Cup Europe - KF3	KSM Motorsport	7th
2013	ADAC Kart Masters - KF3		6th
2013	German Kart Championship - KF Junior		14th
2013	18° South Garda Winter Cup - KF3		21st
2013	Andrea Margutti Trophy - KF Junior		16th
2013	WSK Euro Series - KF Junior		28th
2013	CIK-FIA European Championship - KF Junior		17th
2014	German Kart Championship - KF Junior	Morsicani Racing s.r.l.	10th
2014	ADAC Kart Masters - KF Junior		11th
2014	CIK-FIA European Championship - KF Junior	Forza Racing	37th

== Racing record ==
=== Racing career summary ===
Season	Series	Team	Races	Wins	Poles	F/Laps	Podiums	Points	Position
2015	Ginetta Junior Championship	HHC Motorsport	10	2	1	1	4	211	11th
2016	ADAC Formula 4 Championship	Motopark	24	0	0	1	0	25	19th
2017	ADAC Formula 4 Championship	ADAC Berlin-Brandenburg	20	0	0	2	2	71	13th
2017	Italian F4 Championship	BWT Mücke Motorsport	9	0	0	0	0	28	NC†
2018	FIA Formula 3 European Championship	Van Amersfoort Racing	21	0	0	0	0	1	22nd
2018	Macau Grand Prix	Van Amersfoort Racing	1	0	0	0	0	N/A	DNF
2019	Formula Regional European Championship	Van Amersfoort Racing	24	0	0	1	0	149	7th
2019	Macau Grand Prix	HWA Racelab	1	0	0	0	0	N/A	DNF
2020	FIA Formula 3 Championship	Campos Racing	16	0	0	0	0	0	29th
2020	European Le Mans Series - LMP2	Richard Mille Racing Team	3	0	0	0	0	2	25th
2020	24 Hours of Le Mans - LMP2	Richard Mille Racing Team	1	0	0	0	0	N/A	9th
2021	Deutsche Tourenwagen Masters	Team Abt	14	0	0	0	0	8	18th
2021	FIA World Endurance Championship - LMP2	Richard Mille Racing Team	6	0	0	0	0	31	13th
2021	24 Hours of Le Mans - LMP2	Richard Mille Racing Team	1	0	0	0	0	N/A	DNF
2021	European Le Mans Series - LMP2	Algarve Pro Racing	1	0	0	0	1	15	21st
2022	European Le Mans Series - LMP2	Algarve Pro Racing	4	0	0	0	1	23	13th
2022	24 Hours of Le Mans - LMP2 Pro-Am	Algarve Pro Racing	1	0	0	0	0	N/A	5th
2023	FIA Formula 3 Championship	PHM Racing by Charouz	18	0	0	0	0	6	23rd
2023	Macau Grand Prix	Van Amersfoort Racing	1	0	0	0	0	N/A	11th
2024	FIA Formula 3 Championship	Van Amersfoort Racing	20	0	0	0	0	0	29th
2025	Indy NXT	HMD Motorsports	1	0	0	0	0	18	26th
2025	BOSS GP - Formula Pro Class	R&B Research and Wealth Management	2	2	2	2	2	52	7th
2025	European Le Mans Series - LMP2	Algarve Pro Racing	Test and development driver						
2026–27	Formula E	Opel GSE Formula E Team	Test and development driver						

^{†} As Flörsch did not compete in the required number of rounds, she was ineligible for a championship position.

=== Complete Ginetta Junior Championship results ===
(key) (Races in bold indicate pole position) (Races in italics indicate fastest lap)

Year	Team	Car	1	2	3	4	5	6	7	8	9	10	11	12	13	14	15	16	17	18	19	20	DC	Points
2015	HHC Motorsport	Ginetta G40	BHI; 1; 5	BHI; 2; 21	DON; 1; 8	DON; 2; 8	THR; 1; 1	**THR**; **2**; 1	OUL; 1; 4	OUL; 2; 4	**CRO**; **1**; 2	CRO; 2; 3	SNE; 1	SNE; 2	KNO; 1	KNO; 2	ROC; 1	ROC; 2	SIL; 1	SIL; 2	BHGP; 1	BHGP; 2	11th	211

=== Complete ADAC Formula 4 Championship results ===
(key) (Races in bold indicate pole position) (Races in italics indicate fastest lap)

Year	Team	1	2	3	4	5	6	7	8	9	10	11	12	13	14	15	16	17	18	19	20	21	22	23	24	Pos	Points
2016	Motopark	OSC1; 1; 8	OSC1; 2 Ret	OSC1; 3; 5	SAC; 1; 14	SAC; 2; 7	SAC; 3; 10	LAU; 1; 13	LAU; 2; 20	LAU; 3; 27	OSC2; 1; 14	OSC2; 2; 20	OSC2; 3; 10	RBR; 1; 16	RBR; 2; 27	RBR; 3; 10	NÜR; 1; 12	NÜR; 2; 14	NÜR; 3; 9	ZAN; 1 Ret	ZAN; 2 Ret	ZAN; 3; 29	HOC; 1; 28	HOC; 2; 12	HOC; 3; 18	19th	25
2017	ADAC Berlin-Brandenburg	OSC1; 1; 15	OSC1; 2; 13	OSC1; 3; 22	LAU; 1 Ret	LAU; 2; 7	LAU; 3; 6	RBR; 1; 18	RBR; 2 Ret	RBR; 3; 19	OSC2; 1; 8	OSC2; 2; 10	OSC2; 3 Ret	NÜR; 1; 19	NÜR; 2; 12	NÜR; 3; 11	SAC; 1; 6	SAC; 2; 3	SAC; 3; 7	HOC; 1 DNS	HOC; 2; 3	HOC; 3; 7				13th	71

=== Complete FIA Formula 3 European Championship results ===
(key) (Races in bold indicate pole position) (Races in italics indicate fastest lap)

Year	Entrant	Engine	1	2	3	4	5	6	7	8	9	10	11	12	13	14	15	16	17	18	19	20	21	22	23	24	25	26	27	28	29	30	DC	Points
2018	Van Amersfoort Racing	Mercedes	PAU; 1	PAU; 2	PAU; 3	HUN; 1	HUN; 2	HUN; 3	NOR; 1	NOR; 2	NOR; 3	ZAN; 1; 23	ZAN; 2; 17	ZAN; 3; 19	SPA; 1; 16	SPA; 2; 17	SPA; 3; 21	SIL; 1; 18	SIL; 2; 19	SIL; 3; 17	MIS; 1; 16	MIS; 2; 19	MIS; 3; 18	NÜR; 1 Ret	NÜR; 2; 15	NÜR; 3; 21	RBR; 1; 17	RBR; 2; 10	RBR; 3; 15	HOC; 1; 15	HOC; 2; 19	HOC; 3; 18	22nd	1

=== Complete Macau Grand Prix results ===
Year	Team	Car	Qualifying	Quali Race	Main race
2018	(Netherlands) Van Amersfoort Racing	Dallara F317	20th	19th	DNF
2019	(Germany) HWA Racelab	Dallara F3 2019	27th	21st	DNF
2023	(Netherlands) Van Amersfoort Racing	Dallara F3 2019	17th	15th	11th

=== Complete Formula Regional European Championship results ===
(key) (Races in bold indicate pole position) (Races in italics indicate fastest lap)

Year	Entrant	1	2	3	4	5	6	7	8	9	10	11	12	13	14	15	16	17	18	19	20	21	22	23	24	25	DC	Points
2019	Van Amersfoort Racing	LEC; 1; 9	LEC; 2; 8	LEC; 3; 5	VLL; 1; 9	VLL; 2; 5	VLL; 3 C*	HUN; 1; 7	HUN; 2; 4	HUN; 3; 6	RBR; 1; 6	RBR; 2; 6	RBR; 3; 5	IMO; 1; 7	IMO; 2; 8	IMO; 3; 4	IMO; 4; 7	CAT; 1; 9	CAT; 2; 8	CAT; 3; 5	MUG; 1; 6	MUG; 2; 8	MUG; 3; 9	MNZ; 1; 6	MNZ; 2; 10	MNZ; 3; 9	7th	149

^{*} The third race in Vallelunga was cancelled due to bad weather and later run in Imola as a fourth race.

=== Complete FIA Formula 3 Championship results ===
(key) (Races in bold indicate pole position; races in italics indicate points for the fastest lap of top ten finishers)

Year	Entrant	1	2	3	4	5	6	7	8	9	10	11	12	13	14	15	16	17	18	19	20	DC	Points
2020	Campos Racing	RBR; FEA; 26	RBR; SPR; 16	RBR; FEA; 21	RBR; SPR; Ret	HUN; FEA; 18	HUN; SPR; 14	SIL; FEA; 22	SIL; SPR; 25	SIL; FEA; 20	SIL; SPR; 19	CAT; FEA; 27	CAT; SPR; 23	SPA; FEA	SPA; SPR	MNZ; FEA; 21	MNZ; SPR; 12	MUG; FEA; 22	MUG; SPR; 24			29th	0
2023	PHM Racing by Charouz	BHR; SPR; 22	BHR; FEA; 20	MEL; SPR; 16	MEL; FEA; 18	MON; SPR; 23	MON; FEA; 23	CAT; SPR; 21	CAT; FEA; 20	RBR; SPR; 18	RBR; FEA; DSQ	SIL; SPR; 19	SIL; FEA; 23	HUN; SPR; 15	HUN; FEA; 18	SPA; SPR; 12	SPA; FEA; 7	MNZ; SPR; 16	MNZ; FEA; 13			23rd	6
2024	Van Amersfoort Racing	BHR; SPR; 23	BHR; FEA; 30†	MEL; SPR; 19	MEL; FEA; Ret	IMO; SPR; 15	IMO; FEA; 12	MON; SPR; Ret	MON; FEA; 19	CAT; SPR; 20	CAT; FEA; 18	RBR; SPR; 26	RBR; FEA; 11	SIL; SPR; Ret	SIL; FEA; Ret	HUN; SPR; 23	HUN; FEA; 23	SPA; SPR; 19	SPA; FEA; Ret	MNZ; SPR; 16	MNZ; FEA; Ret	29th	0

=== Complete European Le Mans Series results ===
(key) (Races in bold indicate pole position; results in italics indicate fastest lap)

Year	Entrant	Class	Chassis	Engine	1	2	3	4	5	6	Rank	Points
2020	Richard Mille Racing Team	LMP2	Oreca 07	Gibson GK428 4.2 L V8	LEC	SPA	LEC; 11	MNZ; 10	ALG; 11		25th	2
2021	Algarve Pro Racing	LMP2	Oreca 07	Gibson GK428 4.2 L V8	CAT	RBR	LEC	MNZ	SPA	ALG; 3	21st	15
2022	Algarve Pro Racing	LMP2	Oreca 07	Gibson GK428 4.2 L V8	LEC; 2	IMO; 8	MNZ; 10	CAT; 12	SPA	ALG	13th	23

=== Complete 24 Hours of Le Mans results ===
Year	Team	Co-Drivers	Car	Class	Laps	Pos.	Class Pos.
2020	(France) Richard Mille Racing Team	(Colombia) Tatiana Calderón (Netherlands) Beitske Visser	Oreca 07-Gibson	LMP2	364	13th	9th
2021	(France) Richard Mille Racing Team	(Colombia) Tatiana Calderón (Netherlands) Beitske Visser	Oreca 07-Gibson	LMP2	74	DNF	DNF
2022	(Portugal) Algarve Pro Racing	(United States) John Falb (United Kingdom) Jack Aitken	Oreca 07-Gibson	LMP2	361	25th	20th
2022	(Portugal) Algarve Pro Racing	(United States) John Falb (United Kingdom) Jack Aitken	Oreca 07-Gibson	LMP2 Pro-Am	361	25th	5th

=== Complete FIA World Endurance Championship results ===
(key) (Races in bold indicate pole position) (Races in italics indicate fastest lap)

Year	Entrant	Class	Chassis	Engine	1	2	3	4	5	6	Rank	Points
2021	Richard Mille Racing Team	LMP2	Oreca 07	Gibson GK428 4.2 L V8	SPA; 8	ALG; 6	MNZ; 8	LMS; Ret	BHR; 6	BHR; 9	13th	31

=== Complete Deutsche Tourenwagen Masters results ===
(key) (Races in bold indicate pole position) (Races in italics indicate fastest lap)

Year	Team	Car	1	2	3	4	5	6	7	8	9	10	11	12	13	14	15	16	Pos	Points
2021	Team Abt	Audi R8 LMS Evo	MNZ; 1; 15	MNZ; 2; 15	LAU; 1 Ret	LAU; 2; 15	ZOL; 1; 15	ZOL; 2 Ret	NÜR; 1	NÜR; 2	RBR; 1; 17	RBR; 2; 15	ASS; 1; 9	ASS; 2; 16	HOC; 1; 12	HOC; 2 Ret	NOR; 1; 13	NOR; 2; 9	18th	8

=== American open–wheel racing results ===
==== Indy NXT ====
(key) (Races in bold indicate pole position) (Races in italics indicate fastest lap) (Races with ^{L} indicate a race lap led) (Races with * indicate most race laps led)

Year	Team	1	2	3	4	5	6	7	8	9	10	11	12	13	14	Rank	Points
2025	HMD Motorsports	STP; 12	BAR	IMS	IMS	DET	GMP	RDA	MOH	IOW	LAG	LAG	POR	MIL	NSH	26th	18
