= Mitch Evans =

New Zealander racing driver (born 1994)

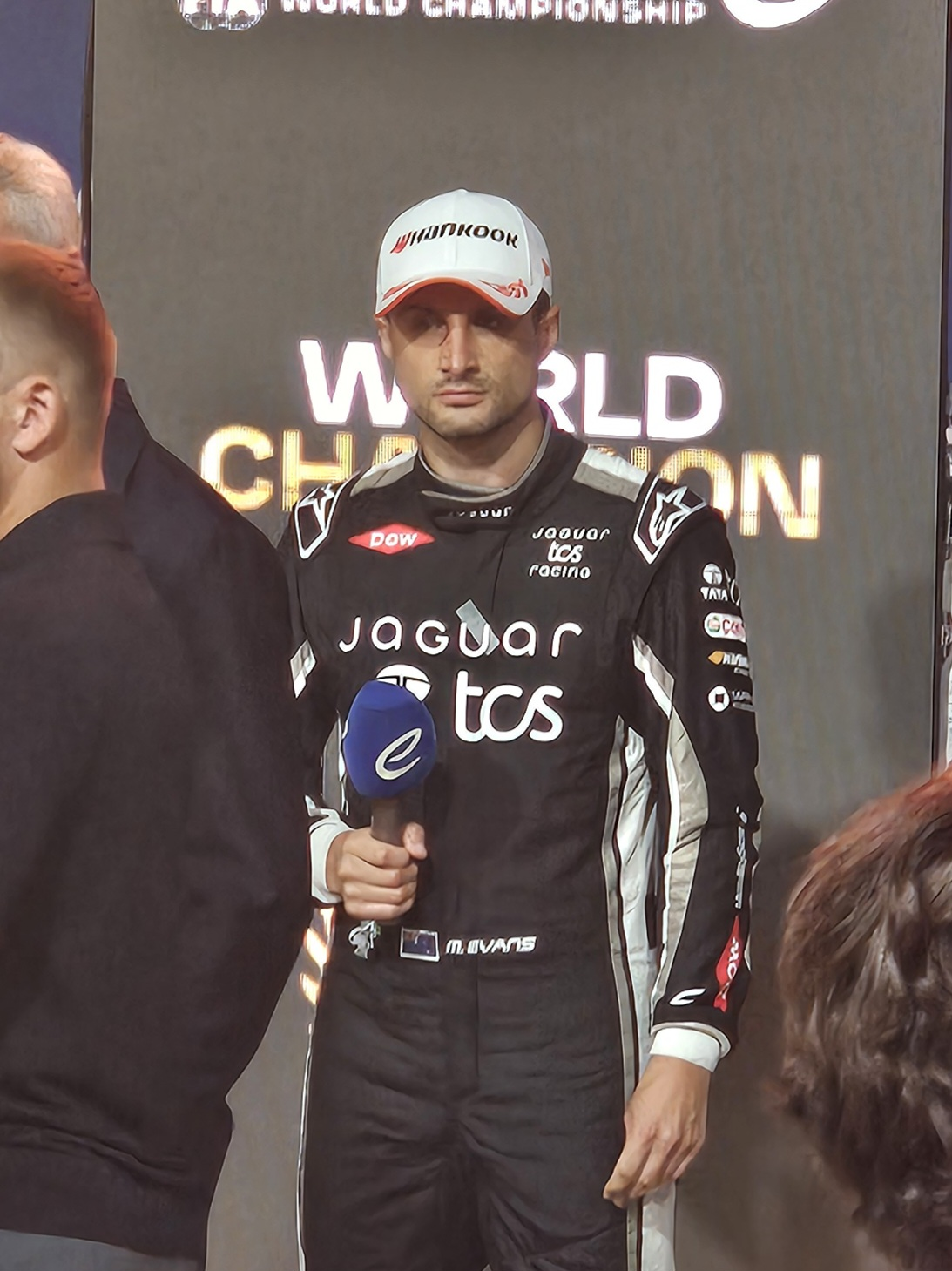
- Evans at the 2026 London ePrix
- Nationality: (New Zealand) New Zealander
- Born: Mitchell William Evans; 24 June 1994 (age 32) Auckland, New Zealand
- Relatives: Simon Evans (brother)

Formula E career
- Debut season: 2016–17
- Current team: Opel GSE Formula E Team
- Categorisation: FIA Gold (until 2023); FIA Platinum (2024–)
- Car number: 4
- Former teams: Jaguar TCS Racing
- Starts: 132
- Championships: 0
- Wins: 16
- Podiums: 36
- Poles: 10
- Fastest laps: 9
- Best finish: 2nd in 2021–22, 2023–24
- Finished last season: 3rd (160 pts)

Previous series
- 2013–16 2011–12 2010–12 2009 2009 2008–09 2008 2008 2007–08 2007: GP2 Series; GP3 Series; Toyota Racing Series; Australian Drivers' Champ. Formula Ford Australia; Formula Ford Fiesta Series; Formula Ford New Zealand; FFord Manfeild Winter Series; Formula First New Zealand; FFirst Manfeild Winter Series

Championship titles
- 2012 2010, 2011 2010, 2011 2011: GP3 Series; Toyota Racing Series; TRS International Trophy; New Zealand Grand Prix

Awards
- 2011: Jim Clark Trophy

Mitchell William Evans (born 24 June 1994) is a New Zealand racing driver who is set to compete in Formula E for the Opel GSE Formula E Team. He previously raced for Jaguar Racing between 2016 and 2026. As of September 2026, Evans holds the record for the most total wins in Formula E, with 16.

In his junior career, Evans won the Toyota Racing Series in 2010 and 2011, as well as the New Zealand Grand Prix in 2011, when he became the youngest driver to win an international Grand Prix at 16 years old. Moving to Europe, Evans became GP3 Series champion for MW Arden in 2012. He then drove in the GP2 Series, where he won races for Russian Time and Campos Racing between 2013 and 2016.

In late 2016, Evans entered Formula E with the new Jaguar Racing team. He won his first ePrix in 2019, and was a regular title contender between 2020–21 and 2025–26, twice finishing runner-up. In January 2026, Evans broke Sébastien Buemi's all-time Formula E win record. After ten seasons at Jaguar, Evans joined the new Opel team for 2026–27.

== Early career ==
Born in Auckland, Evans was a champion karter in both restricted 100cc karts, and also won the CIK Trophy of New Zealand at JICA level. He moved to Formula First for the 2007 season, competing in three races of the Winter Series at Manfeild Autocourse, and ending the season eighteenth in the championship. He contested the full New Zealand championship in 2007–08, finishing ninth overall and recording a fastest lap.

=== Formula Ford ===
Evans returned to Manfield for the 2008 Winter Series, but in Formula Ford, winning seven of twelve races he contested to take the championship. In his national Formula Ford campaign in 2008–09, Evans battled with Tauranga's Richie Stanaway who came out on top by just over 100 points. Evans won six races during the season, including doubles at Taupo and Manfield.

For 2009, Evans moved to the Australian Formula Ford Championship, and competed in the Victorian state championship. Evans was runner-up in the standings, losing out to CAMS Rising Star Luke Ellery in the state championship, and in the national championship to his team-mate at Sonic Motor Racing Services, Nick Percat. During the season, Evans became the youngest round winner in the championship's history, when he won at Sandown Raceway in August. As well as that win, he won five other races including a weekend sweep at Queensland Raceway, and a double win at Surfers Paradise.

=== Formula Three ===
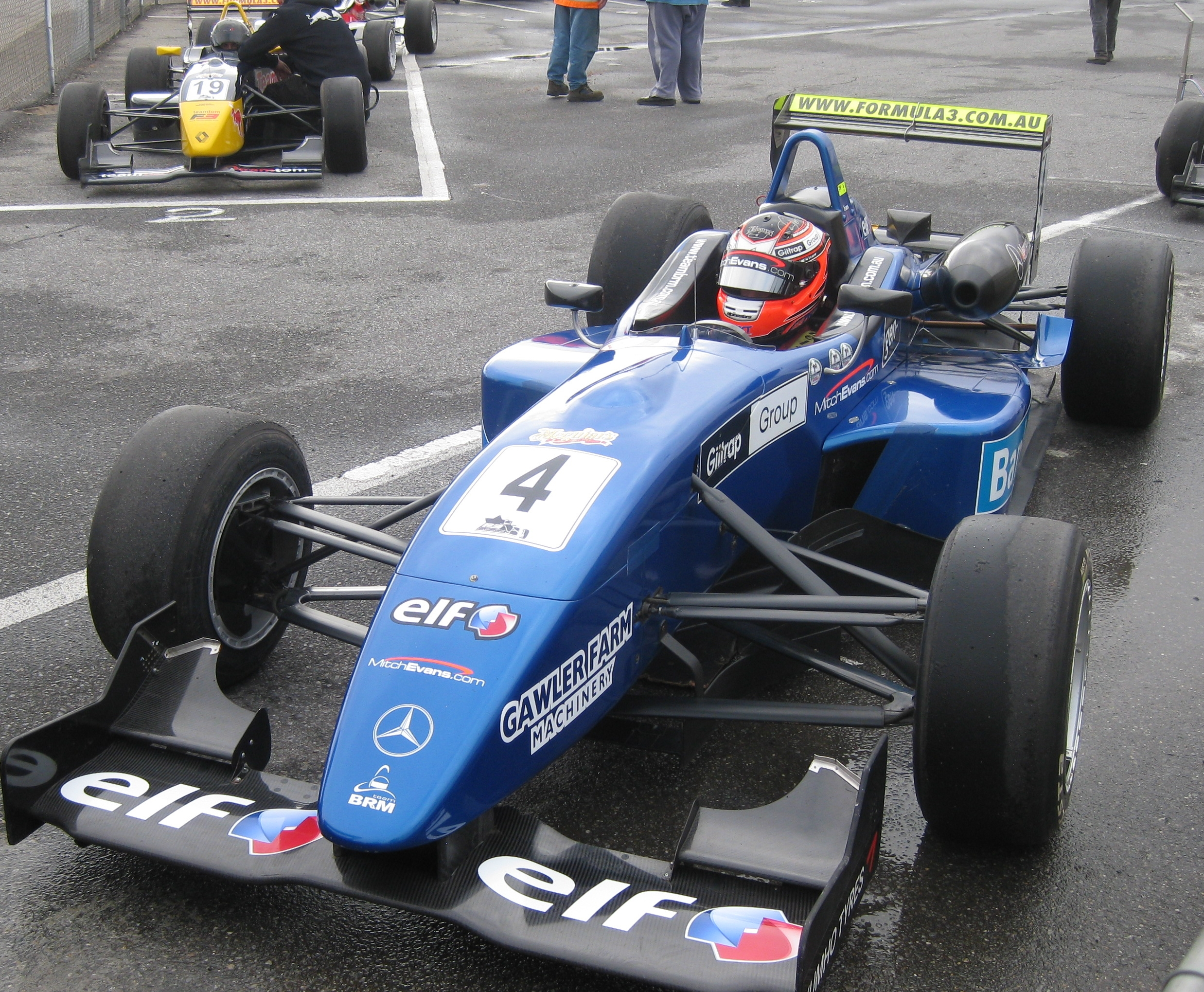
Evans at the fourth round of the 2010 Australian Drivers' Championship at Mallala.

Evans was drafted in by Australian Formula 3 entrant Team BRM to compete for them at the final round of the season, at Sandown. BRM acquired Evans' services to help with Joey Foster's championship bid. Evans was quickly on the pace, setting the fastest time in the official practice session, and third in qualifying. In the first race, he ended up fourth overall and third in the Gold Star class, edging out Kristian Lindbom by just over a tenth of a second. However, in the second race, Evans led home his team-mate Foster to become the youngest winner of the Formula 3 Superprix, but Foster won the Australian Drivers' Championship.

For the 2010 season, Evans raced in New Zealand's Toyota Racing Series with the Giles Motorsport team. At the first round, Evans took pole position and won the race, a feat that had not been achieved since Brendon Hartley made his debut in the 2005 Toyota Racing Series. He added a second win at Timaru, and won the first contemporary formulae race at the new Hampton Downs Motorsport Park. He claimed the title at Taupo by three points, holding off New Zealander Earl Bamber who won all three races at the circuit.

Evans returned to Australian Formula 3 for the 2010 Australian Drivers' Championship, and won the first three races of the season at Wakefield Park. He skipped the second round at Symmons Plains to test a Formula Abarth car at Misano in Italy. But quickly resumed winning at Phillip Island.

=== GP3 ===
==== 2011 ====
Evans was signed to race in the 2011 GP3 Series in Europe by the MW Arden team which is co-owned by Christian Horner (principal of F1's Red Bull Racing), and Red Bull driver Mark Webber (Evans' manager). The series features identical new design Dallara-Renaults, and is considered to be the feeder to GP2 and then F1.

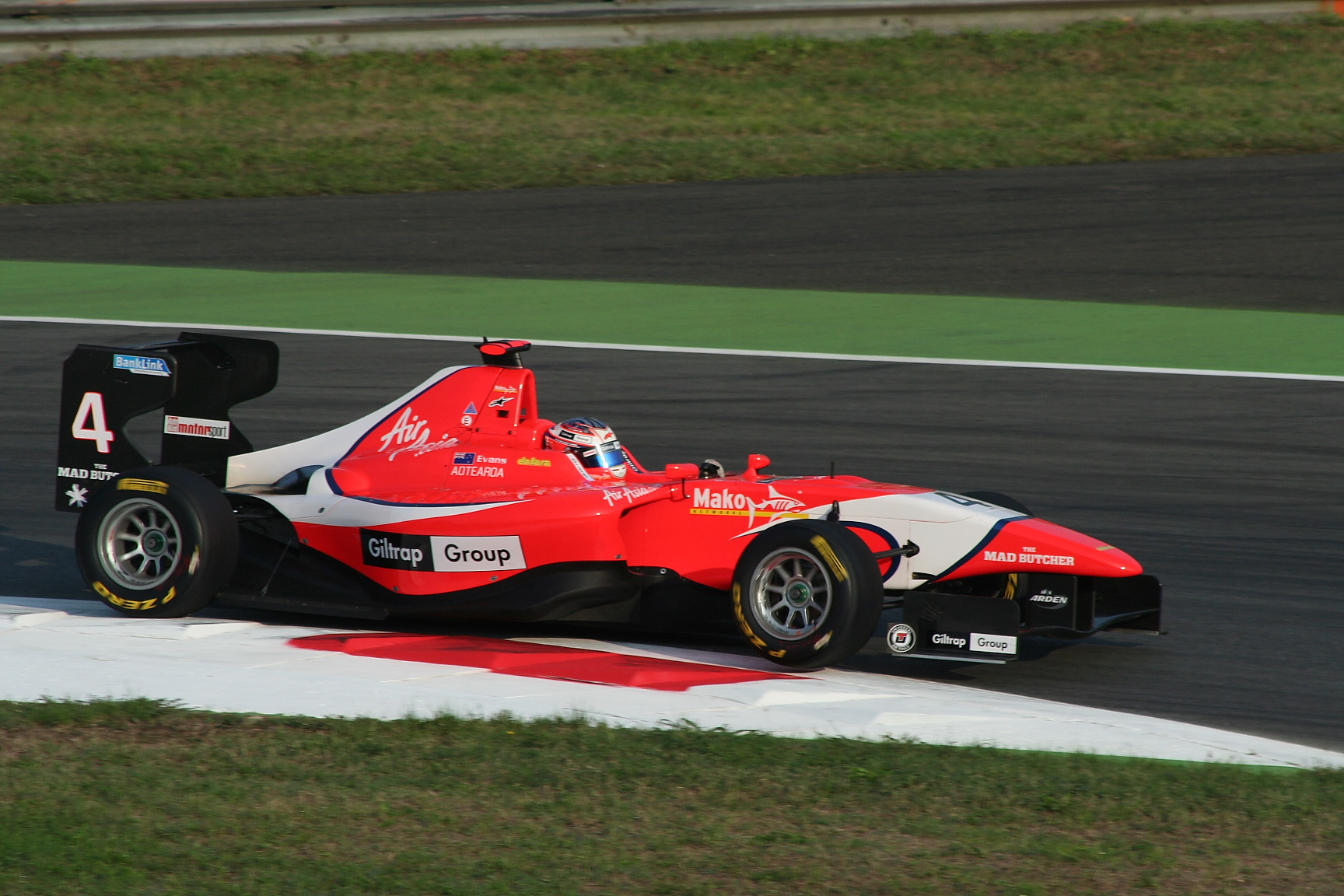
Evans competing at Monza during the 2012 GP3 Series.

Evans won the feature race at Circuit de Catalunya in Spain, having finishing sixth and seventh in the first two races at the first round which was staged at Istanbul Park in Turkey . He then went into the Valencia Grand Prix in third place in the championship, and emerged leading the championship after a third in the feature and fourth in the sprint. He held a four-point lead over second placed Nigel Melker for the GP3 drivers' championship and MW Arden was leading the constructors championship too.

However, Evans' performance dropped off for the rest of the season, and he only achieved another point scoring round when eighth in the feature race of the final round of the championship in Italy. He eventually finished ninth in the championship with 29 points.

==== 2012 ====
Retained by MW Arden for the 2012 GP3 Season, Evans began with a win in the feature race at the opening round of the championship in Spain. He also had wins at Valencia in Spain and on the Hockenheimring in Germany, and a second and two-thirds. He took his fourth pole position of the season at the final venue, Monza in Italy, but did not complete the feature race, requiring him to start from the back of the grid in race two. Evans worked his way through the field to seventh, but a puncture effectively ended his race, and the points for the fastest lap he recorded could not be claimed because he finished outside the top-ten. Daniel Abt of Germany finished second in the race and was runner up to Evans in the championship by only two points.

Mark Webber told the media he was very proud of his protege, and he predicted Evans would move to GP2 in 2013. "There are a lot of good drivers in it (GP3),” he said, "yet it was Mitch who had the most poles and the most wins of anyone. He's learning all the time and I look forward to him moving up to another category next year and showing everyone what an exceptional talent he is."

=== GP2 ===
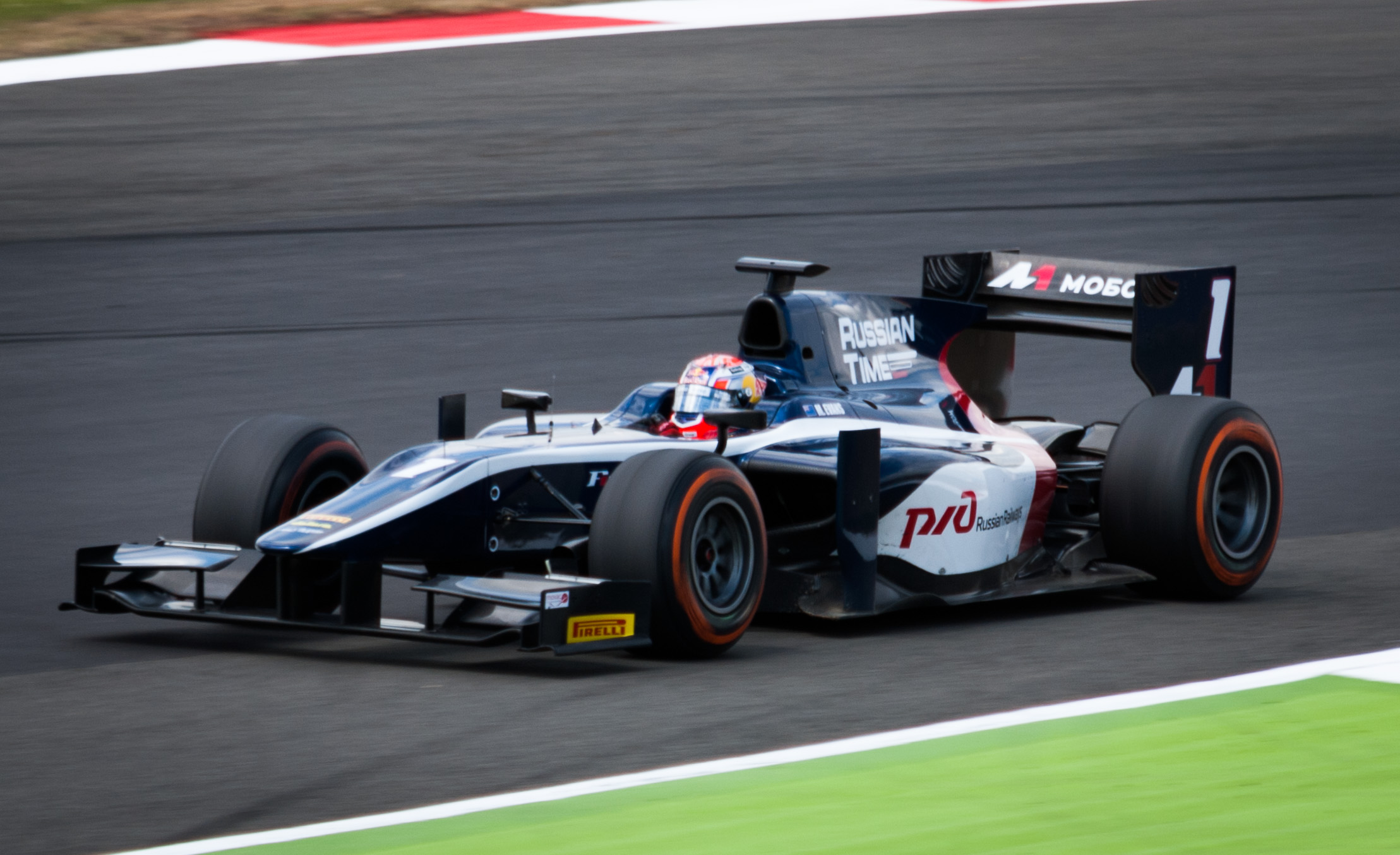
Evans won his first GP2 Series race at Silverstone.

==== 2013 ====
Webber's prediction was correct because Evans moved up to GP2 with Arden as teammate to the very experienced Johnny Cecotto Jr. In the first racing weekend of the season, at Sepang in Malaysia where he had never raced before, Evans was suffering from food poisoning and had handling problems in the first race. But he finished third in the second race and at eighteen years of age, and still a rookie, he became the youngest GP2 driver to stand on the podium.

==== 2014 ====
For the 2014 season, Evans moved to the iSport-run Russian Time team alongside Artem Markelov. He took his maiden victory at Silverstone and then a second at Hockenheim, in what was GP2's 200th race. Four more podium appearances saw him finish fourth in the standings on 174 points, while Markelov placed 24th.

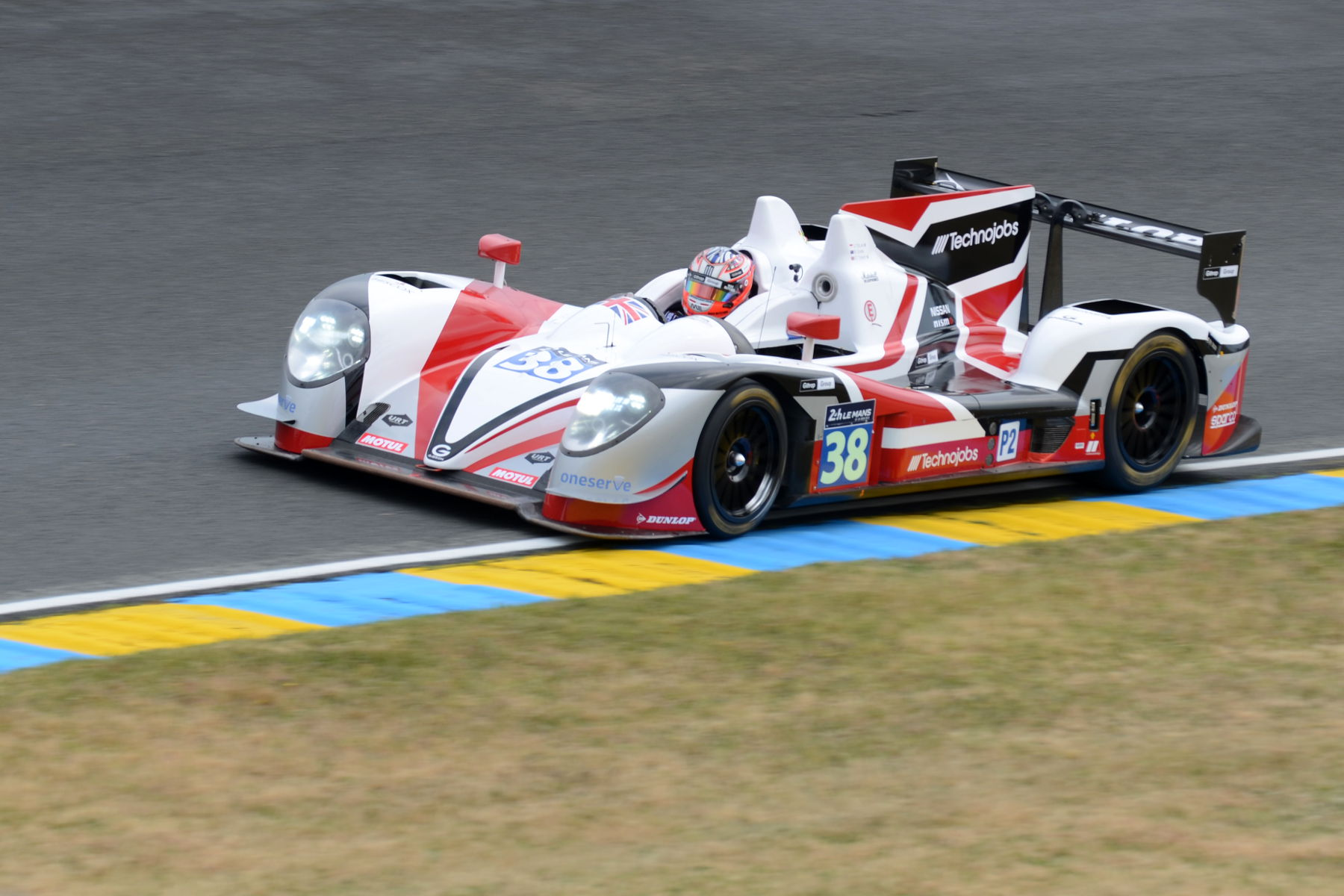
Evans competing at the 2015 24 Hours of Le Mans. He and his teammates finished second in class.

==== 2015 ====
Evans remained with Russian Time for the 2015 season. Markelov was again his teammate. They placed fifth and 13th in the championship.

==== 2016 ====
For the 2016 season, Evans switched to Campos, alongside Sean Gelael. He took his first victory of the season in the Austrian feature race, leading a Campos 1–2 in changing conditions.

== Formula E ==
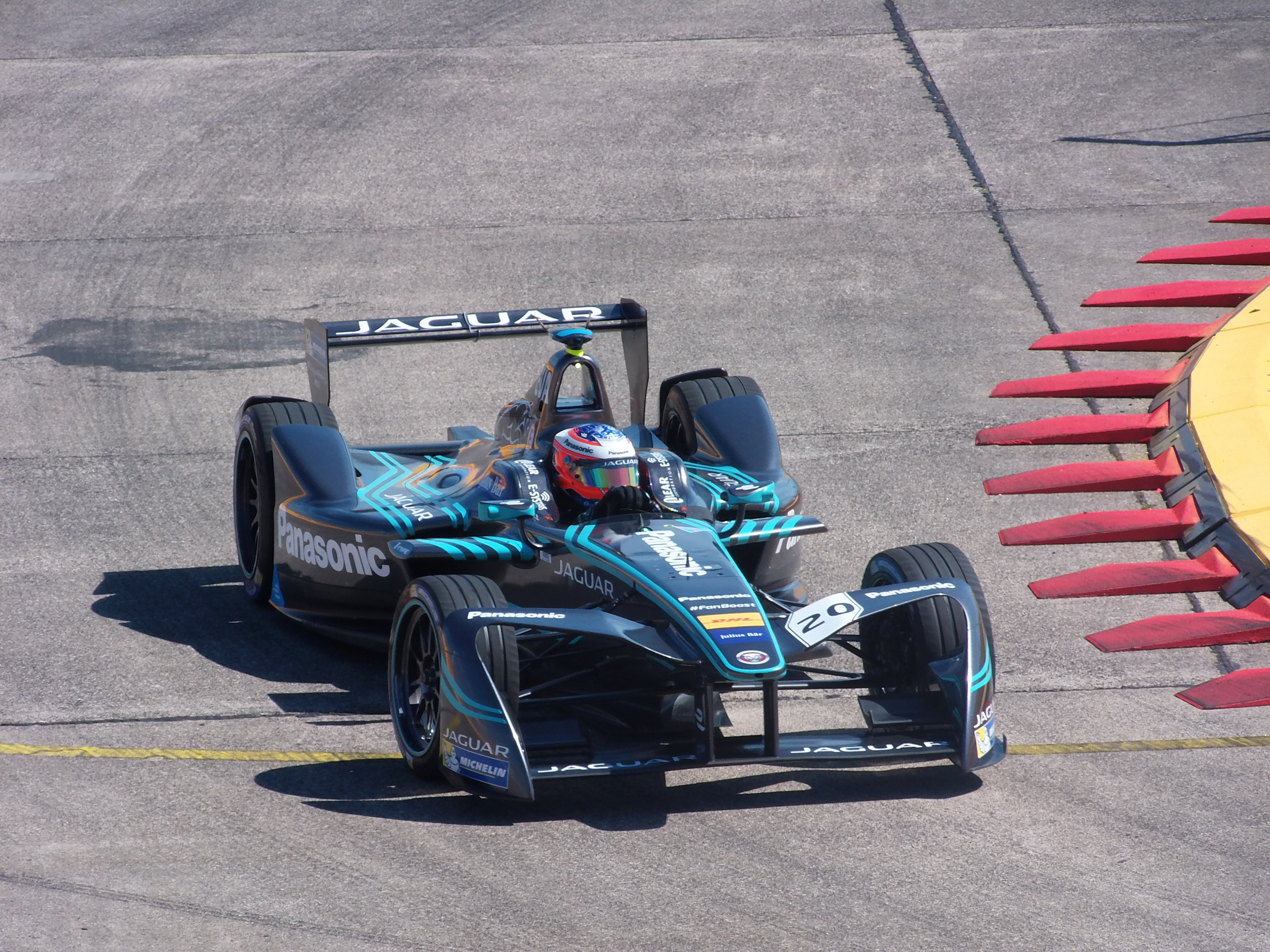
Mitch Evans at the 2017 Berlin ePrix.

On 19 August 2016, it was announced that Evans would be one of four drivers testing with Jaguar at the pre-season test at Donington Park. Evans was later signed with the team.

=== Jaguar Racing (2016–2026) ===
==== 2016–17 season ====
During his first season, he partnered Adam Carroll, scoring 22 points to Carroll's five. His best result of the season came in Mexico City, where he finished in fourth place, taking Jaguar's first points in Formula E. He set the fastest lap of the race in Berlin race 1, but didn't take the bonus point, because he retired from the race. Evans took further points-scoring finishes in Monaco, Paris & Montreal to finish the championship in 14th position.

==== 2017–18 season ====
For the 2017–18 season, Evans partnered Nelson Piquet Jr, who moved to Jaguar from NextEV. In the second race of the season in Hong Kong, Evans took his & Jaguar's first ever Formula E podium, finishing third in after Daniel Abt's disqualification. In Santiago, Evans finished in seventh, behind teammate Piquet, before coming in sixth in Mexico City. In Punta Del Este, Evans qualified in Superpole, but had his time disallowed for a technical infringement & had to start at the back of the grid. He fought his way superbly through the field to take fourth position. For much of the Rome ePrix, Evans was on target for a podium finish, battling with André Lotterer & Lucas di Grassi, but towards the closing stages, he ran out of usable energy & came home in ninth. Evans had a difficult race in Paris, finishing down in 15th position, but he bounced back in Berlin to finish sixth. Evans achieved a huge career milestone in Round 10 of the championship in Zurich, by taking his first ever Formula E pole position. However, he struggled in the race, losing the lead & then being hit by a drive-through penalty for overspeed under full course yellow conditions. He ultimately finished down in seventh. He retired from the first race in New York, but finished in sixth in race 2, to cement seventh in the championship, ahead of teammate Piquet, four points ahead of Lotterer.

==== 2018–19 season ====
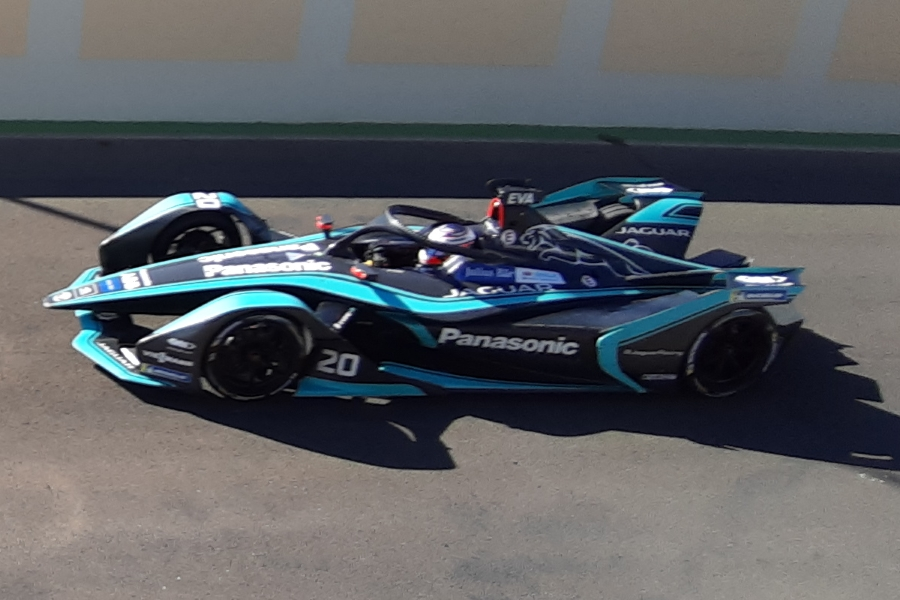
Mitch Evans at the 2019 Marrakesh ePrix.

Evans was partnered by Nelson Piquet Jr. for the second successive year. Evans' season got off to a promising start in Ad Diriyah, finishing in fourth position, whilst teammate Piquet, scored his solitary point of the season in tenth. Evans scored points in all of the first seven races, the only driver to do so. He finished ninth in Marrakesh & benefitted from a penalty given to Alexander Sims in Santiago, to finish sixth. This was followed by seventh in both Mexico City & Hong Kong. For the Rome ePrix, Evans got his Jaguar I-Type III, through to the Superpole shootout & qualified second to Techeetah's André Lotterer. Lotterer held the lead at the start of the race, but a decisive move from Evans at the chicane, gave him the race lead. There was further drama, though. When Evans tried to take the Attack Mode for the second time, he didn't drive through all of the sensors & had to try & activate it the next lap. He also had to slow down during the closing stages, due to the pace during the rest of the race being faster than the Jaguar team had expected. Evans held on to the win, finishing ahead of Lotterer & Stoffel Vandoorne. Rome was also his first race with new teammate Alex Lynn. His first non-points result came in the wet Paris ePrix, where he finished down in 16th. He bounced back in Monaco, to finish seventh, which became sixth after the disqualification of Antonio Felix Da Costa. After a lacklustre Berlin weekend, Evans fought hard with Jean-Eric Vergne in the first ever Bern ePrix. Evans started on the front row & then attacked Vergne for the entire race, but due to the tight circuit & Vergne's defensive driving, Evans had to settle for second. For the first of the two New York City races, Evans qualified in 13th, knowing that his best chance to keep his title hopes alive would be to push through the field. He did just so, finishing less than a second behind race winner Sébastien Buemi in second place. This was enough to keep his title chances alive, with Vergne not scoring in the race. In the weekend's second qualifying session, Evans placed eighth and was set for points until a penultimate lap collision with Lucas di Grassi ended all hopes, although since Robin Frijns won the race he wouldn't have taken it anyway. He finished the season fifth overall with 105 points, helping Panasonic Jaguar take seventh in the constructor's standings.

==== 2019–20 season ====
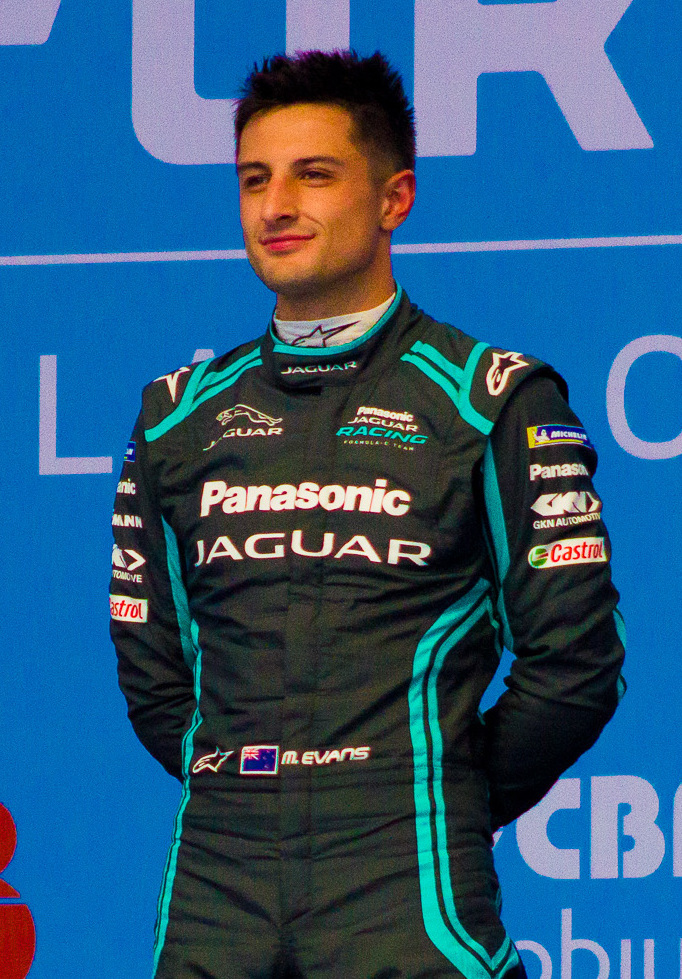
Evans on top of the podium at the Mexico City ePrix

Evans had a new teammate in James Calado for season 6 of Formula E. In the first race of the two Diriyah ePrix, Evans finished in tenth place and also scored the point for setting the fastest lap of the race of the runners in the top-ten. In the second race of the weekend, he collided with Sam Bird, a clash which ended both their races. In the third round of the season, the 2020 Santiago ePrix, Evans set pole position & was set for a dominant victory, but a temperature issue meant he was passed by António Félix da Costa & Maximilian Günther, finishing fourth on the road behind Nyck de Vries, but was promoted to third after the Dutchman received a penalty.

At the next race in Mexico City, Evans qualified second on the grid behind André Lotterer, but took the lead at the very start of the race & won the race with one of the biggest winning margins in the history of Formula E. A timing issue in Marrakesh meant that Evans was unable to set a qualifying time & started towards the back of the grid, but he put in a phenomenal recovery drive to finish 6th in the race.

In the six races in Berlin, Evans scored 15 points, with a fastest lap in race 3, finishing the season in seventh with 71 points.

==== 2020–21 season ====
Evans had a new teammate as Sam Bird made the move from Envision to Jaguar for the seventh season. The season started well with a podium finish in the opening race, however he was involved in a huge crash the following day which saw rival Alex Lynn vault over Evans' car & land upside down in the runoff area. Evans was quick to park his own car to rush to Lynn's aid.

A solid points scoring weekend in Rome followed where Evans took a third & sixth-place finish, followed by a weak showing in Valencia which saw him score no points. Evans was on course to win the following Monaco ePrix until the last lap in which he was overtaken by António Félix Da Costa who had more usable energy & being passed on the line by Robin Frijns who finished second.

Evans was on course for a podium finish in the second race in New York City, before hitting the wall & ending his chance of a points finish. A third-place finish came in the second London ePrix boosting his title aspirations. Evans would have four DNF's throughout the season, and five third places, with a fastest lap in the first Rome E-prix. Evans finished third in the penultimate race in Berlin, placing him fourth in the championship. In the final race of the season the next day, Evans started third and didn't move from the grid and was hit by Edoardo Mortara, eliminating him from the championship fight. Evans finished the season in fourth with 90 points, outscoring Bird by three points who finished sixth.

==== 2021–22 season ====
The season started poorly for Evans who was only able to accrue one point in the first three races. His took his first victory of the season in the first Rome ePrix, a highly regarded drive which saw him charge through the field from ninth on the grid to first, taking his second victory of the weekend the following day. Evans took the third pole position of his Formula E career in Monaco, but was beaten by Stoffel Vandoorne to the race win. Evans took his third race win of the season in Jakarta, where he shadowed Jean-Éric Vergne for much of the race before making an overtake for the win. His only DNF of the season was during the second London EPrix. Mitch won the first race in Seoul, his fourth of the season. Evans finished the season in second with 180 points, 33 behind Stoffel Vandoorne.

==== 2022–23 season ====
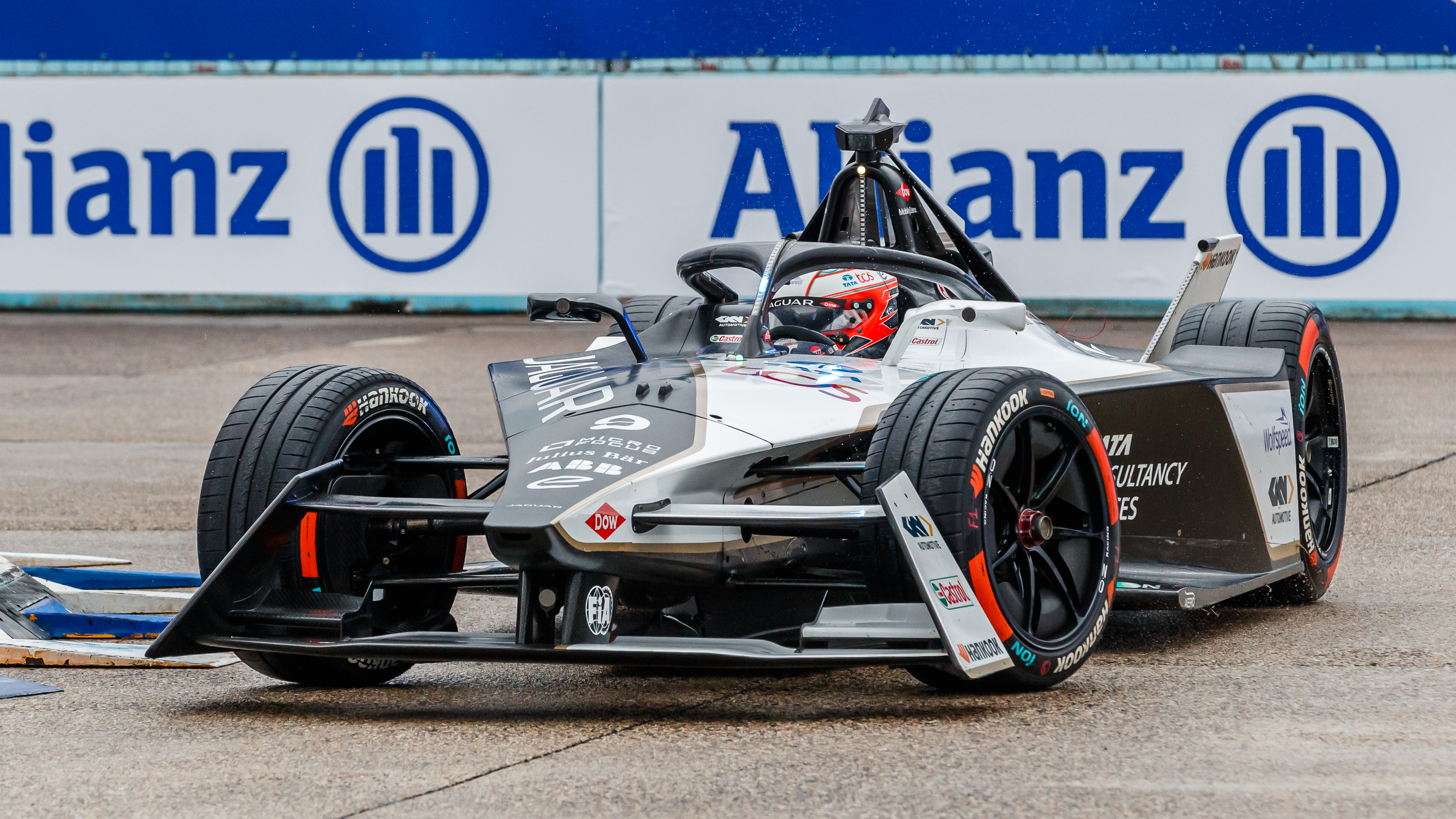
Evans with Jaguar during the 2023 Berlin ePrix

Evans continued his relationship with Jaguar Racing for the 2022–23 season, being partnered by Sam Bird once again. The season began with a trio of points finishes in Mexico City and Diriyah, before Evans managed to take his first pole position of the season ahead of the inaugural Hyderabad ePrix. During the race however, Evans was forced to retire after a collision caused by teammate Bird, having led the race before the incident. After another disappointing result in Cape Town, where the Kiwi was unable to profit from his fourth place in qualifying due to a penalty for a car-related overuse of power, Evans kickstarted his title challenge by winning the São Paulo ePrix, in what he described as a "very special moment". More glory followed during the first race at Berlin, where Evans overtook Sébastien Buemi with two laps to go, thus scoring his second successive victory. Fourth place on Sunday came next, before Evans finished second at Monaco, narrowly missing out to championship leader Nick Cassidy. Jakarta proved more turbulent, with Evans retiring owing to a mistake by Bird which resulted in another collision on Saturday, though the New Zealander would bounce back by finishing third on Sunday. Following a fourth place in Portland, Evans dominated the opening race at the Rome ePrix, scoring pole, setting the fastest lap, and taking victory as title rival Jake Dennis miscalculated his energy use and fell behind the Jaguar driver. This work would be undone by Evans the subsequent day, when he collided into the back of Cassidy during the opening stages of the race, taking both out of contention. He received a five-place grid penalty for the first race of the London ePrix, demoting him from pole position to sixth on Saturday. Nevertheless, Evans managed to win the race, and with a runner-up finish the following day he managed to secure third place in the standings.

==== 2023–24 season ====
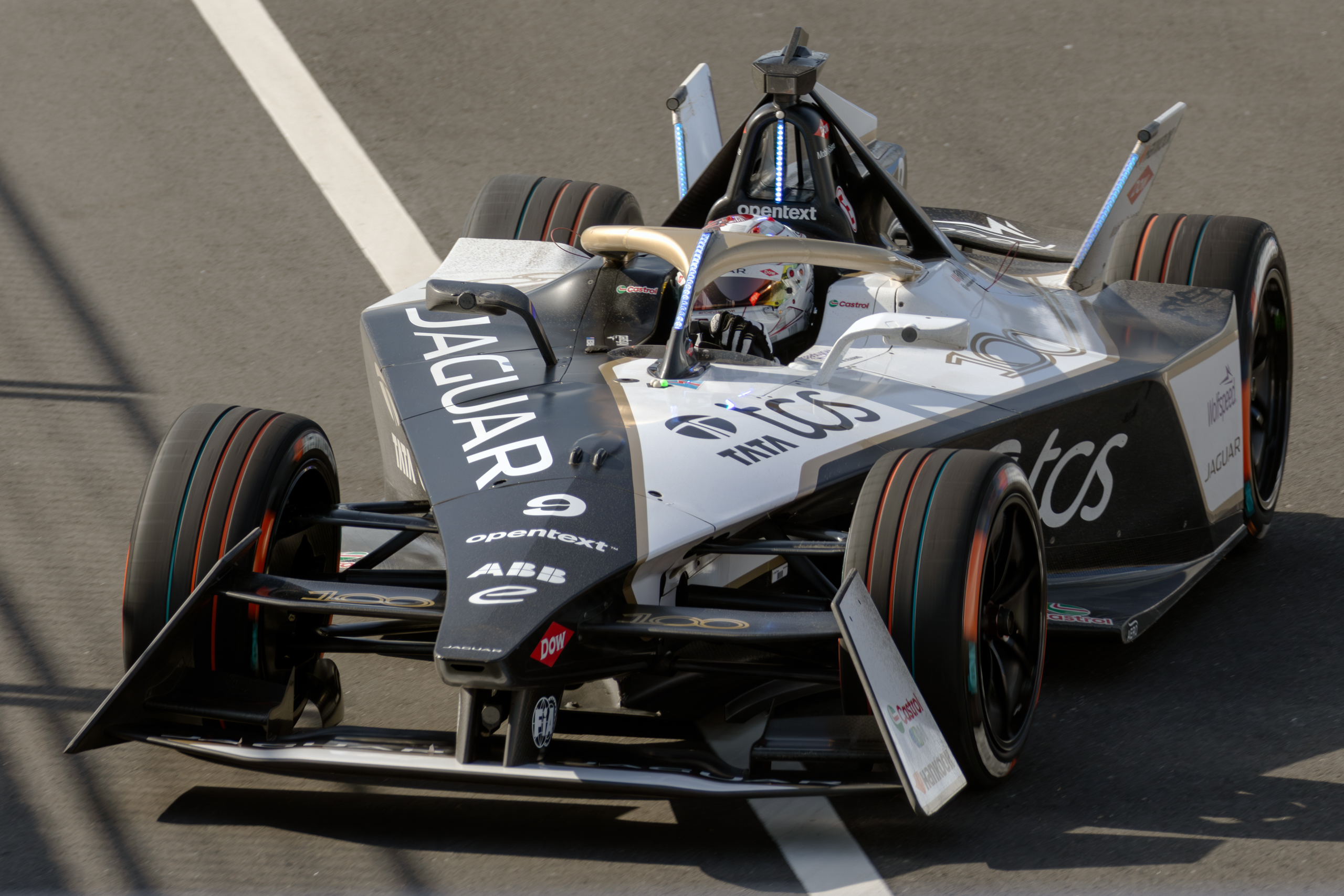
Evans at the 2024 Tokyo ePrix

Following the 2023 London ePrix, Evans signed a multi-year contract to remain at Jaguar TCS Racing for the 2023-24 season and beyond. His Championship contender, Nick Cassidy became his new teammate, replacing Bird. Evans scored two victories in Monaco and Shanghai respectively. For the fourth season in a row, Evans became the title contender heading to the season finale. Evans again failed to clinch the title, and lost to Pascal Wehrlein by six points.

==== 2024–25 season ====
Evans extended his contract with Jaguar TCS Racing for the 2024–2025 season. He started the season by winning at São Paulo. However, this was followed by eleven straight races where he failed to score points before winning at Round 1 of 2025 Berlin ePrix. He finished 13th in the drivers standings. Despite this, he helped Jaguar to get second place with Nick Cassidy as a teammate, in the team standings.

==== 2025–26 season ====
Evans departed Jaguar after spending a decade with the team at the end of the season.

=== Opel (2027–) ===
==== 2026–27 season ====
Evans joined new entrants Opel GSE Formula E Team for the 2026–27 season, partnering Théo Pourchaire.

== Personal life ==
Evans attended Saint Kentigern College in Pakuranga, Auckland, but left at the end of 2010 to pursue his career overseas. Evans' career has been backed financially by entrepreneur Colin Giltrap, who helped establish careers for fellow New Zealand racing drivers Scott Dixon, Chris van der Drift and Brendon Hartley.

Mitch Evans is the younger brother of Simon Evans, a former New Zealand racing driver and the champion of the 2019–20 Jaguar I-Pace eTrophy.

Evans is managed by Mark Webber and Mathieu Michel.

== Racing record ==
=== Career summary ===
Season	Series	Team	Races	Wins	Poles	F/laps	Podiums	Points	Position
2007	Formula First Manfeild Winter Series		3	0	0	0	0	105	18th
2007–08	NZ Formula First Championship	Sabre	18	0	0	1	0	707	9th
2008	Formula Ford Manfeild Winter Series	Sabre	12	7	2	9	10	813	**1st**
2008–09	New Zealand Formula Ford Championship		21	6	3	5	13	1111	**2nd**
2009	Australian Drivers' Championship - Gold Star	Team BRM	2	1	0	0	2	32	5th
2009	Australian Formula Ford Championship	Sonic Motor Racing Services	23	6	3	6	15	297	**2nd**
2009	VSCRC Formula Ford Fiesta Series		2	1	?	?	1	176	**2nd**
2010	Australian Drivers' Championship	Team BRM	17	8	4	4	16	219	**2nd**
2010	Toyota Racing Series	Giles Motorsport	15	3	8	5	10	915	**1st**
2011	GP3 Series	MW Arden	16	1	2	0	2	29	9th
2011	Toyota Racing Series	Giles Motorsport	15	7	6	5	14	973	**1st**
2011	British Formula 3 International Series	Double R Racing	3	0	0	0	0	10	20th
2012	GP3 Series	MW Arden	16	3	4	3	6	151.5	**1st**
2012	Toyota Racing Series	Giles Motorsport	6	2	4	2	4	284	19th
2013	GP2 Series	Arden International	22	0	0	0	4	56	14th
2013	Toyota Racing Series	Giles Motorsport	3	2	2	1	2	204	18th
2014	GP2 Series	RT Russian Time	22	2	0	1	6	174	4th
2014–15	V8SuperTourers Championship	Team 4	3	0	0	1	2	245	28th
2015	GP2 Series	Russian Time	22	2	0	2	7	135	5th
2015	24 Hours of Le Mans - LMP2	Jota Sport	1	0	0	0	1	N/A	**2nd**
2016	GP2 Series	Pertamina Campos Racing	22	1	0	2	1	90	12th
2016	European Le Mans Series	SMP Racing	1	0	0	0	0	10	24th
2016–17	Formula E	Panasonic Jaguar Racing	12	0	0	1	0	22	14th
2017–18	Formula E	Panasonic Jaguar Racing	12	0	1	1	1	68	7th
2018–19	Formula E	Panasonic Jaguar Racing	13	1	0	0	3	105	5th
2019–20	Formula E	Panasonic Jaguar Racing	11	1	1	1	2	71	7th
2020–21	Formula E	Jaguar Racing	15	0	0	3	5	90	4th
2021–22	Formula E	Jaguar TCS Racing	16	4	1	1	7	180	**2nd**
2022–23	Formula E	Jaguar TCS Racing	16	4	3	2	7	197	**3rd**
2023–24	Formula E	Jaguar TCS Racing	16	2	3	1	6	192	**2nd**
2024–25	Formula E	Jaguar TCS Racing	16	2	1	0	2	74	13th
2025–26	Formula E	Jaguar TCS Racing	16	2	0	1	5	160	**3rd**
2026–27	Formula E	Opel GSE Formula E Team	0	0	0	0	0	0	TBD

=== Complete Australian Formula Ford Championship results ===
(key) (Races in bold indicate pole position) (Races in italics indicate fastest lap)

Year	Entrant	1	2	3	4	5	6	7	8	9	10	11	12	13	14	15	16	17	18	19	20	21	22	23	D.C.	Points
2009	Sonic Motor Racing Services	ALB; 1; 2	ALB; 2; 2	WIN; 1; 5	WIN; 2; 3	WIN; 3; 3	SYM; 1; 7	SYM; 2; 5	SYM; 3; 9	HID; 1; 2	HID; 2; 2	HID; 3; 2	SAN; 1; 1	SAN; 2 Ret	SAN; 3; 6	**QLD**; **1**; 1	QLD; 2; 1	QLD; 3; 1	**PHI**; **1**; 2	PHI; 2; 2	PHI; 3; 6	**SUR**; **1**; 1	SUR; 2; 1	SUR; 3; 15	2nd	297

=== Complete Toyota Racing Series results ===
(key) (Races in bold indicate pole position) (Races in italics indicate fastest lap)

Year	Entrant	1	2	3	4	5	6	7	8	9	10	11	12	13	14	15	D.C.	Points
2010	Giles Motorsport	**TER**; **1**; 1	**TER**; **2**; 2	TER; 3; 6	**TIM**; **1**; 1	**TIM**; **2**; 6	TIM; 3; 2	**HMP**; **1**; 1	HMP; 2; 3	**HMP**; **3**; 5	**MAN**; **1**; 7	MAN; 2; 4	**MAN**; **3**; 2	TAU; 1; 2	TAU; 2; 2	TAU; 3; 3	1st	915
2011	Giles Motorsport	**TER**; **1**; 2	TER; 2; 1	TER; 3; 3	**TIM**; **1**; 1	**TIM**; **2**; 1	TIM; 3; 3	HMP; 1; 1	HMP; 2; 2	HMP; 3; 1	MAN; 1; 2	MAN; 2; 2	**MAN**; **3**; 1	**TAU**; **1** Ret	**TAU**; **2**; 1	TAU; 3; 3	1st	973
2012	Giles Motorsport	TER; 1	TER; 2	TER; 3	TIM; 1	TIM; 2	TIM; 3	TAU; 1	TAU; 2	TAU; 3	**MAN**; **1**; 1	**MAN**; **2** Ret	MAN; 3; 2	**HMP**; **1**; 1	HMP; 2; 2	**HMP**; **3** Ret	19th	284
2013	Giles Motorsport	TER; 1	TER; 2	TER; 3	TIM; 1	TIM; 2	TIM; 3	TAU; 1	TAU; 2	TAU; 3	**HMP**; **1**; 1	HMP; 2; 4	**HMP**; **3**; 1	MAN; 1	MAN; 2	MAN; 3	18th	204

=== Complete Australian Drivers Championship results ===
(key) (Races in bold indicate pole position) (Races in italics indicate fastest lap)

Year	Entrant	Chassis	Engine	1	2	3	4	5	6	7	8	9	10	11	12	13	14	15	16	17	18	19	20	21	D.C.	Points
2010	Team BRM	Dallara F307	Mercedes HWA	**WAK**; **1**; 1	WAK; 2; 1	WAK; 3; 1	SYM; 1	SYM; 2	SYM; 3	**PHI**; **1**; 1	PHI; 2; 1	PHI; 3; 1	**MAL**; **1**; 3	MAL; 2; 2	MAL; 3; 2	**MOR**; **1**; 5	MOR; 2; 3	MOR; 3; 2	**EAS**; **1**; 1	EAS; 2; 1	EAS; 3; 3	SAN; 1; 2	SAN; 2 C	SAN; 3; 2	2nd	219

=== Complete GP3 Series results ===
(key) (Races in bold indicate pole position) (Races in italics indicate fastest lap)

Year	Entrant	1	2	3	4	5	6	7	8	9	10	11	12	13	14	15	16	D.C.	Points
2011	MW Arden	IST; FEA; 6	IST; SPR; 7	**CAT**; **FEA**; 1	CAT; SPR; 5	VAL; FEA; 3	VAL; SPR; 4	SIL; FEA; 9	SIL; SPR; Ret	**NÜR**; **FEA**; 19	NÜR; SPR; 22	HUN; FEA; Ret	HUN; SPR; 24†	SPA; FEA; 11	SPA; SPR; Ret	MNZ; FEA; 8	MNZ; SPR; Ret	9th	29
2012	MW Arden	CAT; FEA; 1	CAT; SPR; 20	MON; FEA; 5	MON; SPR; 4	**VAL**; **FEA**; 1	VAL; SPR; 6	**SIL**; **FEA**; 2	SIL; SPR; 11	HOC; FEA; 8	HOC; SPR; 1	HUN; FEA; 3	HUN; SPR; 21	**SPA**; **FEA**; 3	SPA; SPR; 15	**MNZ**; **FEA**; Ret	MNZ; SPR; 20	1st	151.5

^{†} Driver did not finish the race, but was classified as he completed over 90% of the race distance.

=== Complete GP2 Series results ===
(key) (Races in bold indicate pole position) (Races in italics indicate fastest lap)

Year	Entrant	1	2	3	4	5	6	7	8	9	10	11	12	13	14	15	16	17	18	19	20	21	22	DC	Points
2013	Arden International	SEP; FEA; 10	SEP; SPR; 3	BHR; FEA; Ret	BHR; SPR; 15	CAT; FEA; 12	CAT; SPR; 13	MON; FEA; 3	MON; SPR; 3	SIL; FEA; 19	SIL; SPR; 14	NÜR; FEA; 16	NÜR; SPR; 7	HUN; FEA; 7	HUN; SPR; 2	SPA; FEA; 11	SPA; SPR; 10	MNZ; FEA; Ret	MNZ; SPR; 15	MRN; FEA; 11	MRN; SPR; 15	YMC; FEA; Ret	YMC; SPR; 14	14th	56
2014	RT Russian Time	BHR; FEA; 14	BHR; SPR; 7	CAT; FEA; 14	CAT; SPR; 20†	MON; FEA; 2	MON; SPR; 6	RBR; FEA; 7	RBR; SPR; 4	SIL; FEA; 1	SIL; SPR; 7	HOC; FEA; 1	HOC; SPR; 11	HUN; FEA; 12	HUN; SPR; 9	SPA; FEA; 5	SPA; SPR; 4	MNZ; FEA; 3	MNZ; SPR; 20†	SOC; FEA; 2	SOC; SPR; 4	YMC; FEA; 3	YMC; SPR; 5	4th	174
2015	Russian Time	BHR; FEA; 6	BHR; SPR; 17	CAT; FEA; 2	CAT; SPR; DNS	MON; FEA; Ret	MON; SPR; DNS	RBR; FEA; 10	RBR; SPR; 5	SIL; FEA; Ret	SIL; SPR; 20	HUN; FEA; 17	HUN; SPR; 22	SPA; FEA; 5	SPA; SPR; 3	MNZ; FEA; 3	MNZ; SPR; 1	SOC; FEA; 11	SOC; SPR; 8	BHR; FEA; 3	BHR; SPR; 1	YMC; FEA; 3	YMC; SPR; C	5th	135
2016	Pertamina Campos Racing	CAT; FEA; 12	CAT; SPR; 14	MON; FEA; 5	MON; SPR; 4	BAK; FEA; 5	BAK; SPR; Ret	RBR; FEA; 1	RBR; SPR; 8	SIL; FEA; 4	SIL; SPR; 13	HUN; FEA; 10	HUN; SPR; 5	HOC; FEA; Ret	HOC; SPR; 10	SPA; FEA; 16	SPA; SPR; 13	MNZ; FEA; 8	MNZ; SPR; Ret	SEP; FEA; 8	SEP; SPR; 6	YMC; FEA; 15	YMC; SPR; 8	12th	90

^{†} Driver did not finish the race, but was classified as he completed over 90% of the race distance.

=== 24 Hours of Le Mans results ===
Year	Team	Co-drivers	Car	Class	Laps	Pos.	Class pos.
2015	(United Kingdom) Jota Sport	(United Kingdom) Simon Dolan (United Kingdom) Oliver Turvey	Gibson 015S-Nissan	LMP2	358	10th	**2nd**

=== Complete European Le Mans Series results ===
Year	Entrant	Class	Chassis	Engine	1	2	3	4	5	6	Rank	Points
2016	SMP Racing	LMP2	BR Engineering BR01	Nissan VK45DE 4.5 L V8	SIL; 5	IMO	RBR	LEC	SPA	EST	24th	10

=== Complete Formula E results ===
(key) (Races in bold indicate pole position; races in italics indicate fastest lap)

Year	Team	Chassis	Powertrain	1	2	3	4	5	6	7	8	9	10	11	12	13	14	15	16	17	Pos	Points
2016–17	Panasonic Jaguar Racing	Spark SRT01-e	Jaguar I-Type 1	HKG; Ret	MRK; 17	BUE; 13	MEX; 4	MCO; 10	PAR; 9	BER; Ret	BER; 17	NYC; NC	NYC; Ret	MTL; 7	MTL; 12						14th	22
2017–18	Panasonic Jaguar Racing	Spark SRT01-e	Jaguar I-Type 2	HKG; 12	HKG; 3	MRK; 11	SCL; 7	MEX; 6	PDE; 4	RME; 9	PAR; 15	BER; 6	**ZUR**; 7	NYC; Ret	NYC; 6						7th	68
2018–19	Panasonic Jaguar Racing	Spark SRT05e	Jaguar I-Type 3	ADR; 4	MRK; 9	SCL; 6	MEX; 7	HKG; 7	SYX; 9	RME; 1	PAR; 16	MCO; 6	BER; 12	BRN; 2	NYC; 2	NYC; 17					5th	105
2019–20	Panasonic Jaguar Racing	Spark SRT05e	Jaguar I-Type 4	DIR; 10	DIR; 18	**SCL**; 3	MEX; 1	MRK; 6	BER; 13	BER; 12	BER; 9	BER; 7	BER; 7	BER; 11							7th	71
2020–21	Jaguar Racing	Spark SRT05e	Jaguar I-Type 5	DIR; 3	DIR; Ret	RME; 3	RME; 6	VLC; Ret	VLC; 15	MCO; 3	PUE; 8	PUE; 9	NYC; Ret	NYC; 13	LDN; 14	LDN; 3	BER; 3	BER; Ret			4th	90
2021–22	Jaguar TCS Racing	Spark SRT05e	Jaguar I-Type 5	DIR; 10	DIR; 21	MEX; 19	RME; 1	RME; 1	**MCO**; 2	BER; 5	BER; 10	JAK; 1	MRK; 3	NYC; 11	NYC; 3	LDN; 5	LDN; Ret	SEO; 1	SEO; 7		2nd	180
2022–23	Jaguar TCS Racing	Formula E Gen3	Jaguar I-Type 6	MEX; 8	DRH; 10	DRH; 7	**HYD**; Ret	CAP; 11	SAP; 1	BER; 1	BER; 4	MCO; 2	JAK; Ret	JAK; 3	POR; 4	**RME**; 1	RME; Ret	**LDN**; 1	LDN; 2		3rd	197
2023–24	Jaguar TCS Racing	Formula E Gen3	Jaguar I-Type 6	MEX; 5	DRH; 5	DRH; 10	SAP; 2	TOK; 15	**MIS**; 5	MIS; NC	MCO; 1	BER; 4	BER; 6	SHA; 1	SHA; 5	**POR**; 8	POR; 3	**LDN**; 2	LDN; 3		2nd	192
2024–25	Jaguar TCS Racing	Formula E Gen3 Evo	Jaguar I-Type 7	SAP; 1	MEX; Ret	JED; 19	JED; Ret	MIA; 16	MCO; 20	MCO; 18	TKO; Ret	TKO; DNS	SHA; 20	SHA; 14	JKT; 12	**BER**; 1	BER; 5	**LDN**; 10	LDN; 5		13th	74
2025–26	Jaguar TCS Racing	Formula E Gen3 Evo	Jaguar I-Type 7	SAO; Ret	MEX; 11	MIA; 1	JED; 3	JED; 7	MAD; 2	BER; 6	BER; 1	MCO; 2	MCO; 4	SAN; Ret	SHA; 8	SHA; DNS	TKO; 4	TKO; Ret	LDN; 8	LDN; 4	3rd	160

^{*} Season still in progress.

Sporting positions
Preceded by Mitch Cunningham	Toyota Racing Series; Champion; 2010–2011	Succeeded by Nick Cassidy
Preceded by Earl Bamber	New Zealand Grand Prix; Winner; 2011	Succeeded by Nick Cassidy
Preceded by Valtteri Bottas	GP3 Series; Champion; 2012	Succeeded by Daniil Kvyat
