= Opel GSE Formula E Team =

German Formula E team

(Germany) Opel GSE Formula E Team
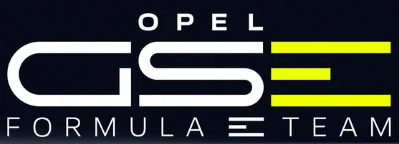
- Founded: 2026
- Base: Rüsselsheim, Germany
- Team principal(s): Jörg Schrott
- Current series: Formula E
- Current drivers: (New Zealand) 4. Mitch Evans (France) 12. Théo Pourchaire; Test driver(s) (Germany) Sophia Flörsch (Note: Test and Development driver)
- Races: 0
- Wins: 0
- Podiums: 0
- Poles: 0
- Points: 0
- Website: https://www.opel-motorsport.com/en

The Opel GSE Formula E Team is a German motor racing team owned by Opel. The team is set to compete in Formula E in the 2026–27 Formula E World Championship.

== History ==
Following the 2025–26 Formula E World Championship, Stellantis owned subsidiary DS Automobiles decided to exit the championship and their partnership with the Penske Formula E team. Opel, another Stellantis subsidiary, announced that it was entering the championship as a 12th team. The team entered as Opel GSE Formula E Team.

In April 2026, Sophia Flörsch was announced as the team's test and development driver. Later in the year, 2023 Formula 2 champion Théo Pourchaire was revealed as Opel's first full-time driver for its debut season. Following the end of the 2025–26 season, Opel completed its lineup by signing Mitch Evans.

== Results ==
Year	Chassis	Powertrain	Tyres	No.	Drivers	1	2	3	4	5	6	7	8	9	10	11	12	13	14	15	16	17	18	19	20	21	Points	T.C.
Opel GSE Formula E Team
2026–27	Formula E Gen4	Opel GSE 27FE	B			MEX	COA	MIA	SAO	SYX	JED		MCO		BER		GBR		NED		MAD		SHA		TKO			
2026–27	Formula E Gen4	Opel GSE 27FE	B	4	(New Zealand) Mitch Evans																							
2026–27	Formula E Gen4	Opel GSE 27FE	B	12	(France) Théo Pourchaire																							

Notes

- ^{G} – Driver was fastest in group qualifying stage and was given one championship point.
- † – Driver did not finish the race, but was classified as he completed over 90% of the race distance.
- * – Season still in progress.
